= List of aerospace engineering schools =

Aerospace (or aeronautical) engineering can be studied at the bachelors, masters and Ph.D. levels in aerospace engineering departments at many universities, and in mechanical engineering departments at others.

Institution names are followed by accreditation where applicable.

== Argentina ==
- Universidad Nacional de Cordoba
- Universidad Nacional de La Plata
- Universidad Tecnológica Nacional, Facultad Regional Haedo
- Universidad Nacional de San Martín

== Australia ==
- Australian Defence Force Academy
- RMIT University
- Monash University
- University of Adelaide
- University of New South Wales
- University of Queensland
- Queensland University of Technology
- University of Sydney

== Austria ==
- FH Joanneum (Graz)
- FH Wiener Neustadt

== Azerbaijan ==
- Azerbaijan State Oil Academy
- Azerbaijan Technical University
- National Aviation Academy

== Bangladesh ==
- Aviation and Aerospace University Bangladesh
- Military Institute of Science and Technology (MIST)
- Bangladesh Air Force Academy (BAFA) (Bachelor in Aeronautics - Air force Personnel only)

== Belgium ==
- Von Karman Institute for Fluid Dynamics (VKI) /M.Res./
- University of Liège (ULg) /M.Eng./
- University of Leuven (KUL) /M.Eng./
- Vrije Universiteit Brussel (VUB) /M.Eng./

== Brazil ==
In Brazil the B.Sc., M.Sc. and PhD degrees in Aerospace Engineering are offered by universities like: Universidade Federal de Santa Catarina – UFSC at Joinville campus, Universidade Federal do ABC – UFABC at Sao Bernardo do Campo campus, Universidade de São Paulo – USP at São Carlos campus, Instituto Tecnologico de Aeronautica – ITA, Universidade Federal de Minas Gerais – UFMG and Universidade de Brasília - UnB at Gama campus. The admission for these courses features among the most difficult in Brazil, partly due to its competitive Vestibular (similar to ACT and SAT in USA).

- University of Brasília (UnB), Brasília-DF
- Universidade Federal de Uberlândia (UFU), Uberlândia-MG
- Taubaté University (UNITAU), Taubaté-SP
- Instituto Nacional de Pesquisas Espaciais (INPE), São José dos Campos-SP (M.Sc. and PhD)
- Universidade do Vale do Paraíba (UNIVAP), São José dos Campos-SP
- Instituto Tecnológico de Aeronáutica (ITA), São José dos Campos-SP
- Universidade Federal de Minas Gerais (UFMG), Belo Horizonte-MG
- Universidade Federal do ABC (UFABC), Santo André-SP
- University of São Paulo's (USP) São Carlos School of Engineering (EESC), São Carlos-SP
- Universidade Federal de Itajubá (UNIFEI), Itajubá-MG
- Federal University of Santa Catarina (UFSC), Joinville-SC
- Fundação Mineira de Educação e Cultura (FUMEC), Belo Horizonte-MG
- Universidade Estadual Paulista "Júlio de Mesquita Filho" (UNESP) Câmpus de de São João da Boa Vista, São João da Boa Vista-SP
- Universidade Federal de Santa Maria (UFSM), Santa Maria, Rio Grande do Sul
- Pontifícia Universidade Católica de Minas Gerais (PUCMinas), Belo Horizonte-MG
- Universidade Federal do Maranhão (UFMA), São Luís (Maranhão)-MA

== Bulgaria ==
- Sofia University, Masters Programme in Space Technologies
- Technical University, Sofia, Masters Programme in Aerospace Engineering

== Canada ==
In Canada, undergraduate degrees in aerospace (or aeronautical) engineering can be earned at Carleton University, Concordia University, École Polytechnique de Montréal, the Royal Military College of Canada and Toronto Metropolitan University. Undergraduate aerospace engineering options, or related programs, are available through, University of British Columbia, McGill University, the University of Toronto, the University of Windsor, and the University of Manitoba. The Canadian Engineering Accreditation Board is responsible for accrediting undergraduate aerospace engineering programs, graduate study in aerospace engineering is also available at several Canadian post-secondary institutions, though Canadian post-graduate engineering programs do not require accreditation.

- Carleton University - B.Eng. (Aerospace Engineering), M.Eng., M.A.Sc. and Ph.D.
- Concordia University - B.Eng. (Aerospace Engineering), M.Eng. and Ph.D.
- École Polytechnique de Montréal - B.Ing. and M.Ing.
- École de Technologie Supérieure - B.Ing. (Mechanical Engineering), M.Ing. and Ph.D.
- Laval University - M.Sc. (Aerospace Engineering)
- McGill University - B.Eng. (Mechanical Engineering), M.Eng. and Ph.D.
- Royal Military College of Canada - B.Eng. (Aeronautical Engineering), M.Eng., M.A.Sc. and Ph.D.
- Toronto Metropolitan University - B.Eng. (Aerospace Engineering), M.Eng., M.A.Sc. and Ph.D.
- University of British Columbia - B.A.Sc. (Mechanical Engineering with Aerospace Option)
- University of Manitoba - B.Sc. (Mechanical Engineering)
- Université de Sherbrooke - B.Ing. (Mechanical Engineering), M.Ing. (Aeronautical Engineering)
- University of Toronto - B.A.Sc. (Engineering Science with Aerospace Option), at the University of Toronto Institute for Aerospace Studies: M.Eng., M.A.Sc. and Ph.D.
- University of Windsor - B.A.Sc. (Mechanical Engineering with Aerospace Option)
- York University - B.A.Sc. (Space Engineering)

In Québec, École Polytechnique de Montréal, McGill University, Laval University, Université de Sherbrooke, Concordia University and École de Technologie Supérieure offer a joint program in the field of aeronautics and space technology leading to a M.Eng. (Aero).

Only undergraduate engineering programs in Canada are accredited, and this is done by the Canadian Engineering Accreditation Board.

== Chile ==
- Federico Santa María Technical University - Academia de Ciencias Aeronáuticas
- University of Concepción -

== China ==
- Beijing University of Aeronautics and Astronautics (北京航空航天大学)
- Beijing Institute of Technology (北京理工大学)
- Civil Aviation Flight University of China (中国民用航空飞行学院)
- Civil Aviation University of China (中国民航大学)
- Fudan University (复旦大学)
- Harbin Institute of Technology (哈尔滨工业大学)
- Nanchang Hangkong University (Nanchang University of Aeronautics) (南昌航空大学)
- Nanjing University of Aeronautics and Astronautics (南京航空航天大学)
- Northwestern Polytechnical University (西北工业大学)
- Shenyang Aerospace University (沈阳航空航天大学)
- Tsinghua University (清华大学)
- Xiamen University (厦门大学)

== Colombia ==
- Universidad Del Valle en Cali (Maestría en Ingeniería )
- Universidad Pontificia Bolivariana en Medellín
- Universidad de Antioquia en Medellín

== Croatia ==
- University of Zagreb - Faculty of mechanical engineering and naval architecture

== Czech Republic ==
- Brno University of Technology
- Czech Technical University in Prague

== Egypt ==
- Institute of Aviation Engineering and Technology
- Cairo University
- Zagazig University

== Finland ==
- Helsinki University of Technology

== France ==
List of public universities and engineering schools:

- CentraleSupélec
- École de l'air et de l'espace
- École des mines d'Albi-Carmaux (IMT Mines Albi)
- École centrale de Lyon
- École nationale de l'aviation civile (ENAC)
- École nationale supérieure d'arts et métiers (ENSAM - Bordeaux)
- École nationale supérieure de mécanique et d'aérotechnique (ISAE-ENSMA)
- École polytechnique de l'université d'Orléans (Polytech Orléans)
- Institut national des sciences appliquées de Lyon (INSA Lyon)
- Institut supérieur de l'aéronautique et de l'espace (ISAE-SUPAERO)
- Institut supérieur de mécanique de Paris (SUPMECA)
- Paul Sabatier University, Toulouse
- University of Bordeaux (ENSPIMA)

List of private engineering schools:

- École d'ingénieurs des sciences aérospatiales (ELISA Aerospace)
- EPF School of Engineering
- ESME-Sudria
- École supérieure des techniques aéronautiques et de construction automobile (ESTACA)
- École supérieure des technologies industrielles avancées (ESTIA)
- Institut polytechnique des sciences avancées (IPSA)

== Germany ==
- FH Aachen
- RWTH Aachen University
- Technische Universität Berlin
- University of Bremen
- Bremen University of Applied Sciences
- Technische Universität Braunschweig
- Technische Universität Darmstadt
- Technical University of Applied Sciences Wildau
- Technische Universität Dresden
- Technical University of Munich
- Munich University of Applied Sciences
- University of the Bundeswehr Munich
- University of Stuttgart
- University of Würzburg - Aerospace Informatics (B.Sc./M.Sc.), Satellite Technology (M.Sc.)
- Hamburg University of Applied Sciences
- Hamburg University of Technology

== Ghana ==
- Kwame Nkrumah University of Science and Technology (B.Sc. in Aerospace Engineering)

== Greece ==
- University of Patras - Mechanical Engineering and Aeronautics
- National and Kapodistrian University of Athens - Department of Aerospace Science and Technology

== Hong Kong ==
- The Hong Kong University of Science and Technology (香港科技大學)
- The Hong Kong Polytechnic University (香港理工大學)

== Hungary ==
- Budapest University of Technology and Economics

== India ==
Aerospace (or aeronautical) engineering can be studied at the bachelor's, master's, and Ph.D. levels in aerospace engineering departments at many Indian universities, and in mechanical engineering departments at others. A few departments offer degrees in space-focused astronautical engineering. Aerospace (or aeronautical) engineering in India has a history even before the Independence of India.

- Indian Institute of Science, Bangalore
- Indian Institute of Technology, Bombay
- Indian Institute of Technology, Kanpur
- Indian Institute of Technology, Madras
- Indian Institute of Technology, Kharagpur
- Indian Institute of Space Science and Technology, Thiruvananthapuram
- Indian Institute of Engineering Science and Technology, Shibpur
- National Institute of Technology, Delhi
- Anna University, Chennai
- Vellore Institute of Technology
- RV College of Engineering
- Chandigarh University
- Amrita School of Engineering, Coimbatore
- Manipal Institute of Technology
- Defence Institute of Advanced Technology
- Punjab Engineering College, Chandigarh
- Kalinga Institute of Industrial Technology (KIIT), Bhubaneshwar
- Birla Institute of Technology, Mesra
- SRM Institute of Science and Technology, Chennai
- Hindustan Institute of Technology and Science
- Lovely Professional University, Phagwara
- Karunya Institute of Technology and Sciences, Coimbatore
- SASTRA Deemed University, Thanjavur

== Indonesia ==
- Bandung Institute of Technology

== Iran ==
- Aerospace Research Institute
- Amirkabir University of Technology
- Ferdowsi University of Mashhad
- Imam Hossein University
- Islamic Azad University - Science and Research Branch
- K.N. Toosi University of Technology
- Malek-Ashtar University of Technology
- Sahand University of Technology
- Shahid Beheshti University
- Shahid Sattari Air University of Science and Technology
- Sharif University of Technology
- Tarbiat Modares University
- Shiraz University of Technology
- University of Semnan
- University of Tabriz
- University of Tehran
- Urmia University of Technology

== Iraq ==
- University of Technology
- University of Baghdad

== Ireland ==
- University of Limerick
- South East Technological University

== Israel ==
- Technion - Israel Institute of Technology

== Italy ==
- University of Salento
- Polytechnic University of Milan
- Polytechnic University of Turin
- Sapienza University of Rome
- University of Campania Luigi Vanvitelli
- University of Bologna
- University of Naples Federico II
- University of Padua
- University of Palermo
- University of Pisa
- University of Roma Tre

== Japan ==
National University

- Hiroshima University (広島大学)
- Kyoto University (京都大学)
- Kyushu Institute of Technology (九州工業大学)
- Kyushu University (九州大学)
- Muroran Institute of Technology (室蘭工業大学)
- Nagoya University (名古屋大学)
- National Defense Academy of Japan (防衛大学校)
- Tokyo Institute of Technology (東京工業大学)
- University of Tokyo (東京大学)
- Tohoku University (東北大学)

Public University

- Tokyo Metropolitan University (東京都立大学)
- Osaka Prefecture University (大阪府立大学)

Private University

- Daiichi University, College of Technology (第一工業大学)
- Kanazawa Institute of Technology (金沢工業大学)
- Nihon University (日本大学)
- Nippon Bunri University (日本文理大学)
- Sojo University (崇城大学)
- Teikyo University (帝京大学)
- Tokai University (東海大学)
- Waseda University (早稲田大学)

== Jordan ==
- University of Jordan
- Jordan University of Science and Technology

== Kenya ==
- Technical University of Kenya - DipTech (Avionics), DipTech (Airframes & Engine), BEng (Aeronautical Engineering)
- Kenyatta University - BSc (Aerospace Engineering)
- Jomo Kenyatta University of Agriculture and Technology - BSc (Aerospace Engineering)

== Korea ==
- Chang-Shin College
- Chonbuk National University
- Chosun University
- Chungnam National University
- Gyeongsang National University
- Hanseo University
- Inha University
- KAIST
- KonKuk University
- Korea Aerospace University
- Pusan National University
- Sejong University
- Seoul National University
- University of Ulsan

== Latvia ==
- Riga Technical University
- Transport and Telecommunication Institute

== Lebanon ==
- University of Balamand

== Malaysia ==
- International Islamic University Malaysia
- Universiti Putra Malaysia
- Universiti Sains Malaysia
- MARA University of Technology
- University of Kuala Lumpur, Malaysian Institute of Aviation Technology
- University Tun Hussein Onn Malaysia
- Nilai University College

== Mexico ==
- Instituto Politecnico Nacional (ESIME Ticoman)
- Universidad Autónoma de Chihuahua
- Universidad Autonoma de Nuevo Leon
- Instituto Politecnico Nacional (UPIIG Guanajuato)
- Universidad Autónoma de Ciudad Juárez
- Universidad Politécnica Metropolitana de Hidalgo
- Universidad Autonoma de Baja California

== Morocco ==
- Académie internationale Mohammed VI de l'aviation civile
- Université Internationale de Rabat

== Myanmar ==
- Myanmar Aerospace Engineering University

== Nepal ==
- Institute of Engineering (Bachelor's in Engineering)

== Netherlands ==
- Delft University of Technology (TU Delft)
- Amsterdam University of Applied Sciences
- Inholland University of Applied Sciences

== Nigeria ==
- African Aviation and Aerospace University, Abuja, Nigeria.
- Nigerian College of Aviation Technology, Zaria
- Kwara State University, Malate, Kwara State.
- Afe Babalola University, Ekiti state
- Lagos State University, Lagos
- Airforce Institute of Technology, Kaduna
- Obafemi Awolowo University, Ile Ife, Osun State

== Norway ==
- University of Tromsø

== Pakistan ==
Aerospace Engineering is a relatively new profession in Pakistan. Its scope is currently high and expected to grow more in future. At present, many institutions offer degrees in Aerospace Engineering and related disciplines.

- Air University, Islamabad
- National University of Sciences and Technology, Islamabad
- Institute of Space Technology, Islamabad 8
- College of Aeronautical Engineering

== Paraguay ==
- Universidad Nacional de Asunción

== Perú ==
- Universidad Alas Peruanas

== Philippines ==
- Ateneo de Davao University
- Air Link International Aviation College
- Batangas State University
- CATS Aero College (formerly Cebu Aeronautical Technical School)
- Cebu Technological University
- Indiana Aerospace University
- PATTS College of Aeronautics

== Poland ==
- Poznan University of Technology
- Rzeszów University of Technology
- Warsaw University of Technology
- Wrocław University of Science and Technology
- Military University of Technology in Warsaw
- Polish Air Force Academy in Dęblin
- The Silesian University of Technology (SUT)

== Portugal ==
- IST - Instituto Superior Tecnico
- NOVA University Lisbon
- Universidade da Beira Interior
- Academia da Força Aérea

== Russian Federation ==
- Moscow Institute of Physics and Technology
- Bauman Moscow State Technical University
- Moscow Aviation Institute
- Samara State Aerospace University
- Moscow State Aviation Technological University (MATI)
- Moscow State Technical University of Civil Aviation (MSTUCA)
- Skolkovo Institute of Science and Technology (Skoltech)
- Saint Petersburg State University of Civil Aviation
- Siberian State Aerospace University
- Kazan Aviation Institute
- Ufa State Aviation Technical University
- Irkutsk State Technical University
- South Ural State University
- Saint Petersburg State University of Aerospace Instrumentation
- Voronezh State Technical University
- Omsk State Technical University
- Novosibirsk State Technical University
- Perm National Research Polytechnic University
- Orenburg State University
- Ulyanovsk State Technical University

== Romania ==
- Politehnica University of Bucharest
- Technical Military Academy of Bucharest
- Transilvania University of Brasov
- University of Craiova

== Saudi Arabia ==
- King Fahd University of Petroleum and Minerals - Aerospace engineering Department
- King Abdulaziz University - Aerospace Engineering Department

== Serbia ==
- University of Belgrade, Faculty of Mechanical Engineering, Aerospace Engineer
- University of Belgrade, Faculty of Transport and Traffic Engineering, Air Transport Engineer (BSc), Master of Civil Aviation (MSc)

== Singapore ==
- National University of Singapore - Department of Mechanical Engineering
- Nanyang Technological University - School of Mechanical and Aerospace Engineering

== Slovakia ==
- Technical University of Košice, Faculty of Aeronautics, Bachelor/Master/PhD. postgraduate technical education

== South Africa ==
- University of the Witwatersrand (Wits), BSc(Eng) Aeronautical & MSc (Eng) Aeronautical (Aerospace)
- University of Pretoria (Tuks), BSc(Eng) Aeronautical

== Spain ==
- Universitat Politècnica de Catalunya
  - Escola Tècnica Superior d'Enginyeries Industrial i Aeronàutica de Terrassa
  - Escola d'Enginyeria de Telecomunicacions i Aeroespacial de Castelldefels EETAC
- Universidad de Sevilla
  - Escuela Superior de Ingenieros
- Universidad Politecnica de València
  - Escola Tècnica Superior d'Enginyeria del Disseny
- Universidad de León
  - Escuela Superior Técnica de Ingeniería Industrial, Informática y Aeronáutica
- Universidad de Cádiz
- Universidad Politécnica de Madrid
  - Escuela Técnica Superior de Ingeniería Aeronáutica y del Espacio
  - Escuela Técnica Superior de Ingeniería Aeronáutica
  - Escuela Universitaria de Ingeniería Técnica Aeronáutica
- Universidad Europea de Madrid
  - Escuela de Ingeniería del Espacio
- Universidad Carlos III de Madrid
- Universidade de Vigo
  - Escola de Enxeñaría Aeronáutica e do Espazo
- Universidad Rey Juan Carlos
  - Escuela Técnica Superior de Ingeniería de Telecomunicación
  - Escuela Superior de Ingeniería
- Universidad Alfonso X el Sabio
  - Escuela Politécnica Superior UAX

== Sri Lanka ==
- Asian Aviation Centre (Sri Lanka)
- General Sir John Kotelawala Defence University (KDU)

== Sudan ==
- Sudan University of Science and Technology, (Khartoum)
- Karary University, (Omdurman)

== Sweden ==
- Luleå University of Technology
- Chalmers University of Technology
- KTH Royal Institute of Technology
- Mälardalen University
- Linkoping University
- Scandinavian Academy of Aeronautics

== Switzerland ==
- ETH Zurich, Centre for Structure Technologies
- Zurich University of Applied Sciences/ZHAW BSc ZFH in Aviatik

== Syria ==
- University of Aleppo - Aerospace Engineering department.

== Taiwan ==
- National Cheng Kung University {NCKU} (國立成功大學) from East, Tainan, Taiwan similar to Purdue(Project Apollo/Saturn V/JSC/KSC), Caltech(JPL/NASA/SpaceX/Human mission to Mars), Georgia Tech(Hypersonic R&D/Model rocket), or ISAE-SUPAERO (ESA)
- National Formosa University {NFU} (國立虎尾科技大學) from Huwei, Yunlin County, Taiwan
- Tamkang University {TKU} (淡江大學) from Tamsui, New Taipei, Taiwan
- Feng Chia University {FCU} (逢甲大學) from Xitun, Taichung, Taiwan
- Chung-Cheng Institute of Technology {CCIT} (國防大學-理工學院) from Bade, Taoyuan, Taiwan also look at air transportation in Taiwan
- Chung-Shan Institute of Science and Technology {CSIST} (國家中山科學研究院) from Longtan, Taoyuan, Taiwan
- National Space Program Office {NSPO} (國家太空中心) from Hsinchu, Taiwan

== Thailand ==
- Assumption University
- Chulalongkorn University
- King Mongkut's University of Technology North Bangkok
- Kasetsart University
- Suranaree University of Technology

== Turkey ==
The Accreditation Board for Engineering and Technology (ABET) accredits two of the institutions offering aerospace (or aeronautical) engineering degrees in Turkey.

- Necmettin Erbakan University
- Anadolu University
- Erciyes University
- Istanbul Gelisim University
- Istanbul Technical University (ABET)
- Middle East Technical University (ABET)
- Turkish Air Force Academy
- Ondokuz Mayıs University
- Adana Science and Technology University
- Izmir University of Economics
- Tarsus University
- Gaziantep University

== Ukraine ==
- National Aerospace University - Kharkiv aviation institute
- Oles Honchar Dnipropetrovsk National University
- National Technical University of Ukraine - Kyiv Polytechnic Institute
- National Aviation University

== United Kingdom ==
In the UK, aerospace (or aeronautical) engineering can be studied at the B.Eng., M.Eng., MSc. and Ph.D. levels at a number of universities. The first institution in the UK to teach in this field was Queen Mary, University of London, which, with the dissolution of the University of Paris (whose chair was founded at around the same time), maintains the longest continuous experience of doing so in the world. In 2017, The Complete University Guide rankings for the top ten undergraduate programs in the United Kingdom were: (1) University of Cambridge, (2) Imperial College London, (3) University of Bristol, (4) University of Bath, (5) University of Southampton, (6) Loughborough University, (7) University of Surrey, (8) University of Leeds, (9) University of Nottingham, and (10) University of Glasgow, where parentheses indicate the ranking. University of Cambridge and Imperial College London are consistently placed within the top 10 institutions offering undergraduate programs and research in aeronautical engineering, both being ranked within the top 10 in the world every year since 2013 by QS World University Rankings and Times Higher Education World University Rankings. The Department of Aeronautics at Imperial College London is noted for providing engineers for the Formula One industry, an industry that uses aerospace technology. Cranfield University is also known to produce the largest number of postgraduates in the UK with an aerospace engineering related degree.

- Ayr College Aerospace Engineering
- University of Bath Aerospace Engineering (MSc/MEng)
- University of Brighton Aeronautical Engineering (MEng/MSc)
- University of Bristol Aeronautical Engineering (MEng)
- Brunel University Aerospace Engineering (BEng/MEng)
- City University, London Aeronautical Engineering (MEng/BEng) Avionics (MEng/BEng)
- Coventry University
- Cranfield University
- Glyndŵr University
- University of Glamorgan (BEng/BSc)
- University of Glasgow Aeronautical Engineering or Avionics (BSc/BEng/MEng)
- University of Hertfordshire (BEng/MEng)
- Imperial College London (MEng)
- Kingston University Aerospace Engineering BSc (Hons), Aerospace Engineering, Astronautics & Space Technology MEng/BEng (Hons), Aerospace Engineering MEng/BEng (Hons)
- University of Leeds Aeronautical and Aerospace Engineering (BEng/MEng)
- University of Leicester Aerospace Engineering (BEng/MEng)
- University of Liverpool Aerospace Engineering (BEng/MEng)
- Loughborough University Aeronautical Engineering (BEng/MEng)
- University of Manchester (BEng/MEng)
- University of Nottingham Aerospace Engineering (MEng/BEng)
- Queen Mary, University of London Aerospace Engineering (MEng/BEng)
- Queen's University Belfast Aerospace Engineering (MEng/BEng)
- University of Salford Aeronautical (aerospace) Engineering (BEng/BSc/MEng/MSc)
- University of Sheffield Aerospace Engineering (MEng) Aerospace Materials (MSc)
- University of Southampton
- Staffordshire University MSc Aeronautical Engineering and BSc (Hons) Aeronautical Technology
- University of Strathclyde BEng (Hons)/MEng Aero-Mechanical Engineering and MEng Mechanical Engineering with Aeronautics
- University of Surrey Aeronautical (aerospace) Engineering (BEng/BSc/MEng/MSc)
- University of Swansea Aerospace Engineering (BEng/MEng/MSc)
- University of the West of England Aerospace Engineering (BEng/MEng)
- University of the West of Scotland Aircraft Engineering (BEng (Hons)/MSc)
- University of the Highlands and Islands Aircraft Engineering (BEng (Hons)/MSc)

== United States ==
Aerospace (or aeronautical) engineering can be studied at the advanced diploma, bachelor's, master's, and Ph.D. levels in aerospace engineering departments at many U.S. universities, and in mechanical engineering departments at others. A few departments offer degrees in space-focused astronautical engineering.

In 2023, the U.S. News & World Report rankings for the top ten undergraduate programs were: (1) Georgia Institute of Technology, (1) Massachusetts Institute of Technology, (3) University of Michigan, (4) Purdue University, (5) California Institute of Technology, (6) Stanford University, (7) Princeton University, (8) University of Illinois at Urbana–Champaign, (9) University of Maryland, College Park, and (10) University of Colorado at Boulder, [10] University of Texas, Austin, where parentheses indicate the ranking, and same number indicates a tie in scores.

In 2016, the U.S. News & World Report rankings for the top ten graduate programs were: (1) Massachusetts Institute of Technology, (2) Georgia Institute of Technology, (2) Stanford University, (4) University of Michigan, (4) California Institute of Technology, (6) Purdue University, (7) University of Texas at Austin, (8) University of Illinois at Urbana–Champaign, (8) University of Colorado at Boulder, (10) Texas A&M University, (10) University of Maryland, College Park, where parenthesis indicate the ranking and the same number indicates a tie in scores.

The Accreditation Board for Engineering and Technology (ABET) accredits almost all of the institutions offering aerospace (or aeronautical) engineering degrees in the United States.

- Air Force Institute of Technology (ABET)
- Arizona State University (ABET)
- Auburn University (ABET)
- Boston University (ABET)
- California Institute of Technology
- California Polytechnic State University, San Luis Obispo (ABET)
- California State Polytechnic University, Pomona (ABET)
- California State University, Long Beach (ABET)
- Case Western Reserve University (ABET)
- Capitol Technology University (ABET)
- Clarkson University (ABET)
- Cornell University (ABET)
- Embry–Riddle Aeronautical University
  - Daytona Beach campus (ABET)
  - Prescott campus (ABET)
  - Worldwide campus (ABET)
- Florida Institute of Technology (ABET)
- Georgia Institute of Technology (ABET)
- Illinois Institute of Technology (ABET)
- Iowa State University (ABET)
- LeTourneau University (ABET)
- Lehigh University (master's and minor) (ABET)
- Massachusetts Institute of Technology (ABET)
- Mississippi State University (ABET)
- Missouri University of Science and Technology (ABET)
- Montana State University (only minor's degree program is offered) (ABET)
- Naval Postgraduate School (ABET)
- New Mexico State University (ABET)
- North Carolina State University (ABET)
- Ohio State University (ABET)
- Oklahoma State University (ABET)
- Pennsylvania State University (ABET)
- Polytechnic Institute of New York University (ABET)
- Princeton University (ABET)
- Purdue University (ABET)
- Rensselaer Polytechnic Institute (ABET)
- Rutgers University (ABET)
- Saint Louis University (ABET)
- San Diego State University (ABET)
- San Jose State University (ABET)
- Southern New Hampshire University (ABET)
- Stanford University
- Syracuse University (ABET)
- Texas A&M University (ABET)
- Tuskegee University (ABET)
- United States Air Force Academy (ABET)
- United States Naval Academy (ABET)
- University at Buffalo, The State University of New York (ABET)
- University of Alabama in Huntsville (ABET)
- University of Alabama (ABET)
- University of Alaska Fairbanks (minor and master's certificate are offered - bachelor's degree beginning fall 2023)
- University of Arizona (ABET)
- University of California, Davis (ABET)
- University of California, Irvine (ABET)
- University of California, Los Angeles (ABET)
- University of California, San Diego (ABET)
- University of Central Florida (ABET)
- University of Cincinnati (ABET)
- University of Colorado at Boulder (ABET)
- University of Florida (ABET)
- University of Hartford (ABET)
- University of Illinois at Urbana–Champaign (ABET)
- University of Kansas (ABET)
- University of Maryland, College Park (ABET)
- University of Miami (ABET)
- University of Michigan (ABET)
- University of Minnesota (ABET)
- University of Missouri (ABET)
- University of Nevada, Las Vegas (only master's degree program is offered) (ABET)
- University of Notre Dame (ABET)
- University of North Dakota (ABET)
- University of Oklahoma (ABET)
- University of Southern California (ABET)
- University of South Carolina
- University of Tennessee at Knoxville (ABET)
- University of Tennessee Space Institute
- University of Texas at Arlington (ABET)
- University of Texas at Austin (ABET)
- University of Virginia (ABET)
- University of Washington (ABET)
- University of Wisconsin–Madison (ABET)
- Utah State University (ABET)
- Virginia Polytechnic Institute and State University (ABET)
- Washington University in St. Louis
- West Virginia University (ABET)
- Western Michigan University (ABET)
- Wichita State University (ABET)
- Worcester Polytechnic Institute (ABET)

== Venezuela ==
- National Experimental Polytechnic University of the Armed Force (UNEFA) - Aeronautical Engineering

== Vietnam ==
- Vietnamese Defence Force and Air Force Academy (DAA) - Aeronautical Engineering
- Hanoi University of Science and Technology (HUST)
- Ho Chi Minh City University of Technology (HCMUT)
- Da Nang University of Technology
- Le Quy Don Technical University (LeTech)
- University of Science and Technology of Hanoi (USTH)
- University of Engineering and Technology, Vietnam National University, Hanoi (UET, VNU)
- Air Force Command - Engineering College
- Vietnam Aviation Academy (VAA)
- Aviation Service Vocational College (Airserco)
