= Karina Gibert =

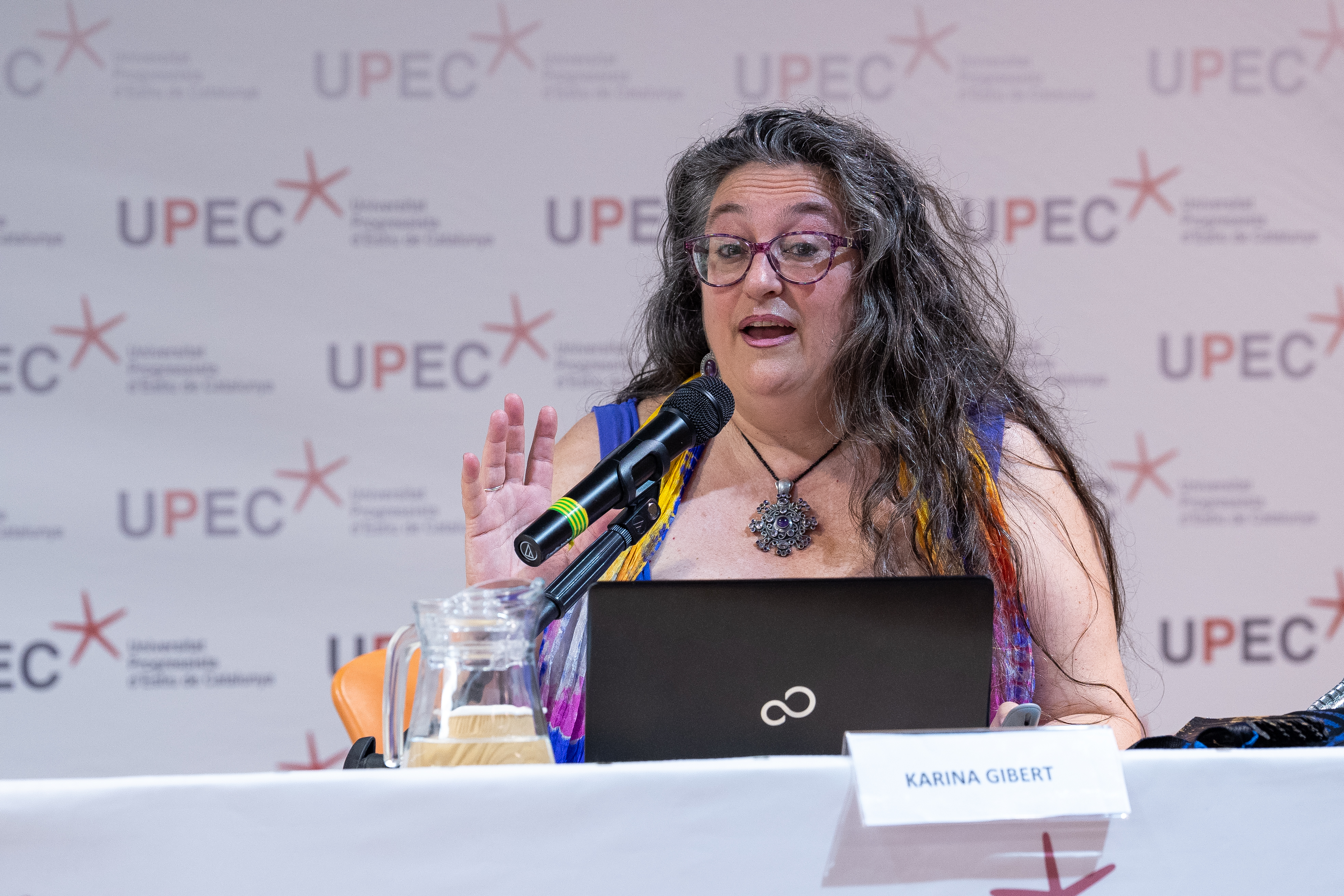
- Education: Technical University of Catalonia
- Occupations: Researcher and data scientist
- Known for: Co-founder of Intelligent Data Science and Artificial Intelligence Research Center

Karina Gibert is a data scientist and researcher at the Technical University of Catalonia. She co-founded the Intelligent Data Science and Artificial Intelligence Research Center (IDEAI) in 2018 and was made director in 2021.

== Education and career ==
In 1990, Gibert was awarded an undergraduate degree in computer science from the Barcelona School of Informatics. She followed this with a master's in computer science in 1991. Gibert then gained her PhD from the Technical University of Catalonia in 1995, researching computational statistics and Artificial Intelligence.

Gibert's research encompasses a variety of topics in statistics, data science and intelligent decision support systems, and she has been a member of the Knowledge Engineering and Machine Learning group (KEMLg) since 1986.

Alongside heading up IDEAI, Gibert became dean of the Official College of Computer Engineering of Catalonia in 2023. She is a member of the International Advisory Board of the Joint Research Center journal Environmental Modeling and Software, and an expert on the Catalonia.AI strategic plan.

In 2022, Gibert was a guest editor for the Women in Artificial Intelligence special issue of the Applied Sciences journal. This provided a collection of AI research led by women, to bridge the gender gap in the field.

== Recognition ==
Karina Gilbert has been recognised for her work, winning various awards such as the Ada Byron Award 2022, the WomenTech Award 2023, and the National Award for Computer Engineering 2023.
