= CFIS =

CFIS may refer to:

== Education ==
- Calgary French and International School
- Centre de Formació Interdisciplinària Superior
