= Jordi Romeu Robert =

Jordi Romeu Robert from the Universitat Politecnica de Catalunya, Barcelona, Spain was named Fellow of the Institute of Electrical and Electronics Engineers (IEEE) in 2012 for contributions to the development of fractal antennas.
