= Marcos Faundez-Zanuy =

Professor and dean of UPC

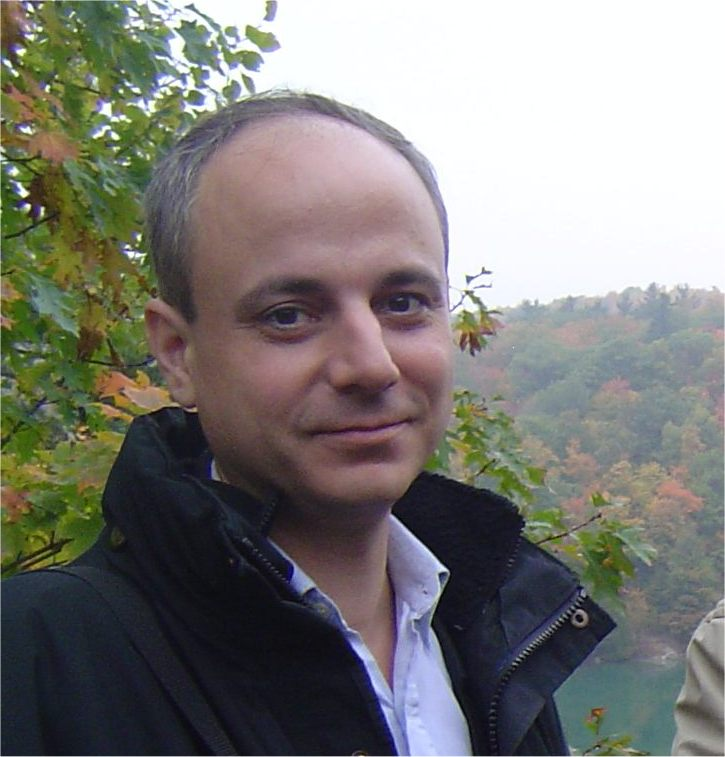
Marcos Faundez

Marcos Faundez-Zanuy (born 1969 in Barcelona, Spain) is full professor and the dean at Escuela Universitaria Politécnica de Mataró (Polytechnic University of Catalonia). He has a PhD in telecommunication from UPC. He was the chair of the European COST action 277 "Non-linear Speech Processing", as well as the secretary of COST-2102 "Cross-Modal Analysis of Verbal and Non-verbal Communication".

== Books Edited in English ==
1. 45th IEEE Carnahan conference on security Technology. Edited by Marcos Faundez-Zanuy, Virginia Espinosa & Larry Sanson. 368 pages, IEEE Catalog Number: CFP11ICR-PRT, ISBN 978-1-4577-0901-2, ISSN 1071-6572.
2. Encyclopedia of Artificial Intelligence Edited By: Juan R. Rabuñal; Julian Dorado; Alejandro Pazos Sierra author of the chapter “Biometric security technology”. pp. 262–269, ISBN 978-1-59904-849-9 IGI Global
3. Advances in Nonlinear Speech Processing and applications. Editors: Gérard Chollet, Anna Esposito, Marcos Faundez-Zanuy & Maria Marinaro. Springer Verlag LNCS Vol. 3445. 433 pages. ISBN 3-540-27441-3.
4. “Nonlinear analyses and algorithms for speech processing” Lecture Notes in Computer Science LNCS 3817. ISBN 3-540-31257-9. ISSN 0302-9743. Editors: Marcos Faundez-Zanuy, Léonard Janer, Ana Esposito, Antonio Satue, Josep Roure, Virginia Espinosa. 380 pages. January 2006.
5. Progress in Nonlinear speech processing. Editors: Yannis Stylianou, Marcos Faundez-Zanuy & Anna Esposito. Springer Verlag LNCS Vol. 4391. 269pages. ISBN 978-3-540-71503-0 May 2007.
6. Verbal and Nonverbal Commun. Behaviours, LNAI vol. 4775 Editors: A. Esposito, M. Faundez-Zanuy, E. Keller 2007. Lecture Notes in Artificial Intelligence 325 p. Springer. ISBN 978-3-540-76441-0
7. Biometric ID Management and Multimodal Communication Joint COST 2101 and 2102 International Conference, BioID_MultiComm 2009, Madrid, Spain, September 16–18, 2009, Proceedings Series: Lecture Notes in Computer Science Subseries: Image Processing, Computer Vision, Pattern Recognition, and Graphics, Vol. 5707 Editors: Fierrez, J.; Ortega-Garcia, J.; Esposito, A.; Drygajlo, A.; Faundez-Zanuy, M. 2009, XIII, 358 p., Softcover ISBN 978-3-642-04390-1. September 2009
