= Maria Bruna =

Spanish applied mathematician

Maria Bruna Estrach (born 1984) is an applied mathematician whose interests include stochastic modelling of multiscale phenomena with applications in mathematical biology and industry. She is affiliated with the University of Oxford, where she is a university lecturer and Royal Society University Research Fellow in the Mathematical Institute.

== Education and career ==
Bruna was born in 1984 in Barcelona and grew up in Sant Cugat del Vallès, a town to the north of Barcelona, and while growing up there became an avid field hockey player with Júnior Futbol Club. She studied mathematics and industrial engineering as an undergraduate at the Centre de Formació Interdisciplinària Superior of the Polytechnic University of Catalonia, completing her studies there in 2008.

After coming to the University of Oxford for a one-year master's degree program in mathematical ophthalmology, she was invited to stay at Oxford for her doctoral studies, and completed a DPhil in applied mathematics in 2012.

After completing her doctorate, Bruna was a postdoctoral researcher in computer science at the University of Oxford, an Olga Taussky Pauli Fellow and senior postdoctoral researcher at the Johann Radon Institute for Computational and Applied Mathematics in Austria, and a junior research fellow in mathematics at St John's College, Oxford, before moving to Cambridge in 2019.

== Recognition ==
In 2016 Bruna was awarded a L’Oréal-UNESCO Women in Science Fellowship, the first given in mathematics. She is also a 2016 winner of the Aviva Women of the Future Awards.

In 2020 the London Mathematical Society gave Bruna a Whitehead Prize "in recognition of her outstanding research in asymptotic homogenisation, most prominently in the systematic development of continuum models of interacting particles systems".
