= Jordi Rodríguez-Amat =

Spanish sculptor (born 1994)

Jordi Rodríguez-Amat is an artist, sculptor and photographer from Spain. He was born on 2 November 1944 in Barcelona, Spain. He is the son of Francesco and Enriqueta Rodrigues-Amat. He graduated from the Fine Art School in Barcelona in 1964, the University of Barcelona in 1970 and the Polytechnic University of Catalonia in 1972 where he received a degree in technical architect. He was a professor at the University of Barcelona from 1977 to 1986 and at the Polytechnic University Catalonia from 1990 to 1994. He has been the president of the Rogriguez-Amat Foundation since 1994.
