= Barcelona School of Agricultural Engineering =

Coordinates: 41.2758°N 1.9864°E

Barcelona School of Agri-Food and Biosystems Engineering (EEABB)
- Escola d'Enginyeria Agroalimentària i de Biosistemes de Barcelona (EEABB).
- Type: Public
- Established: 1911
- Director: Anna Gras
- Location: Castelldefels, Catalonia, Spain
- Website: https://eeabb.upc.edu/en

The Barcelona School of Agri-Food and Biosystems Engineering (EEABB) is a university center founded in 1912. EEABB is nowadays an engineering school of the UPC-BarcelonaTech offering bachelor's and master's degrees in the field of Biosystems engineering.

In 1911 the President of the Provincial Council of Barcelona, the great patrician Enric Prat de la Riba, promoted the creation of the College of Agriculture of Barcelona and on July 11 of that year approved the corresponding order. On October 25, the first board of the school was established and Mr. Manuel Raventos and Domenech was designed as first director of the School. The ESAB settled into a new factory building at Can Batllo (now the site of the Industrial School of Barcelona) which has 10 hectares of experimental fields in the land around him. 1912-1913 was the first academic year with seven students admitted.

The school had a dual purpose: firstly, to train farmers in a good scientific practice. Secondly, to become a research center helping to solve the problems faced by the national agriculture.

In 2020 changed its name from ESAB to EEABB.

At the moment, EEABB organizes and participates in several bachelor's and master's degrees.

Bachelor's degrees:

Agricultural Engineering. Modern agriculture, efficient and technologically advanced based on respect for the environment and animal welfare .

Agricultural Environmental and Landscape Engineering. Landscape and environmental management of natural resources and green spaces for a better world.

Food Engineering. Food industry, food and beverage processing, control and food safety, probiotics, foods high value, ...

Biosystems Engineering. Biotechnology applied to food and bioprocesses industry, waste management and environment.

Culinary and Gastronomic Sciences. Science and technology applied to good food.

Master's degrees:

- Master's degree in Agricultural Engineering: Graduates of the master’s degree in Agricultural Engineering have been trained to work in management, design, planning and technological innovation in rural, agricultural and agri-food settings, with a view to improving production, use, industrial processing and the defence and conservation of the environment, and reconciling productivity, quality, economics and development.
- KET 4 Food + Bio. Enabling technologies (robotics, nanotechnology, photonics, ...) applied to the food and bioprocesses industry.
- Aquaculture. Aquaculture techniques studied from multidisciplinary management and management of associated industries.
- Master's degree in Landscape Architecture (MBLandArch). The aim of the master’s degree in Landscape Architecture (MBLandArch) is to provide an up-to-date response to current landscaping problems and to equip graduates with skills in landscape analysis, planning, design and management, while including the new challenges of adopting EU directives, laws and standards that refer either directly or indirectly to the landscape..
