= Universidad Politécnica Metropolitana de Hidalgo =

Public state university in Hidalgo, Mexico

Metropolitan Polytechnic University of Hidalgo
- Universidad Politécnica Metropolitana de Hidalgo
- Type: Public polytechnic
- Established: January 9, 2008
- Location: Tolcayuca, Hidalgo, Mexico; 19°56′44″N 98°53′21″W
- Colors: Purple
- Website: upmh.edu.mx

The Universidad Politécnica Metropolitana de Hidalgo (UPMH, Metropolitan Polytechnic University of Hidalgo) is a public state university in the state of Hidalgo. It was created by an executive order signed on January 9, 2008, and published in the official state newspaper on January 13 of that year.

Is a public institution of the State Government, that has a goal of imparting superior education in the levels of degree, technological specialization and other graduate studies, update courses in their different modalities, and also to serve to the development and progress of the society. Doing its function through three substantive areas, which are teaching, research and extension.

It began academic activities with 35 students on May 29, 2006, using a leased building in Tolcayuca, located at Carretera Acceso a Tolcayuca, San Javier, with two academic buildings and one for workshops and laboratories, and a capacity of 2,000 students in two shifts. At the beginning of September 2017, the school enrolled 600 students in the four educational programs.

== Programs ==
- Logistics and Transport Engineering
- Information Technology Engineering
- Manufacturing Engineering Technology
- Environmental Engineering
- Animation and Visual Effects Engineering
- Small Business Administration and Management
- Architecture
- International trade and Customs
