= School of Industrial and Aeronautic Engineering of Terrassa =

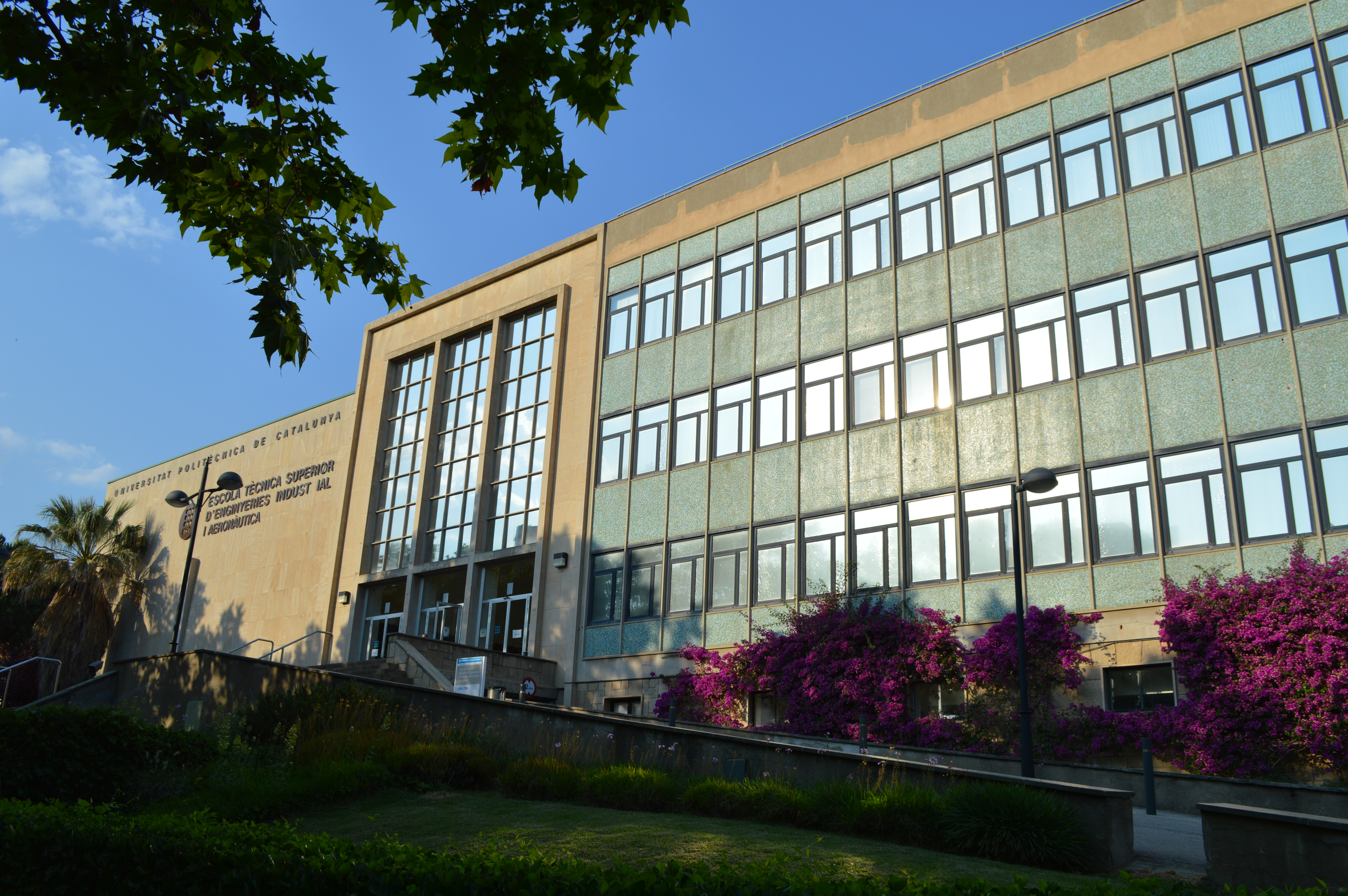
ETSEIAT building

The School of Industrial and Aeronautic Engineering of Terrassa or ETSEIAT (in Catalan Escola Tècnica Superior d'Enginyeries Industrial i Aeronàutica de Terrassa) is a public institution of higher education founded in 1904 and part of the Polytechnic University of Catalonia (UPC). It is located in Terrassa, about 1 hour from Barcelona, Spain.

== Studies ==
=== Bachelor ===
- Bachelor's Degree in Industrial Technology Engineering
- Bachelor's Degree in Aerospace Technology Engineering
- Bachelor's Degree in Aerospace Vehicle Engineering

=== Master ===
- Master's Degree in Industrial Engineering
- Master's Degree in Aerospace Engineering
- Master's Degree in Management Engineering (taught in English)
- Master's Degree in Engineering of Automatic Systems and Power Electronics

=== PhD ===
- Mechanical Engineering, Fluids and Aeronautics
- Thermal Engineering
- Textile and Paper Engineering
- Optical Engineering
- Electric Energy Systems

== Main figures ==
- 19 UPC Basic Unities present
- 2437 students
- 310 teaching and research staff
- 73 administration and services staff
- 27 classrooms dedicated to teaching
- 9 classrooms with PCs
