= Barcelona School of Informatics =

Spanish informatics school

Coordinates: 41°23′16.15″N 2°6′44.33″E

- Facultat d’Informàtica de Barcelona
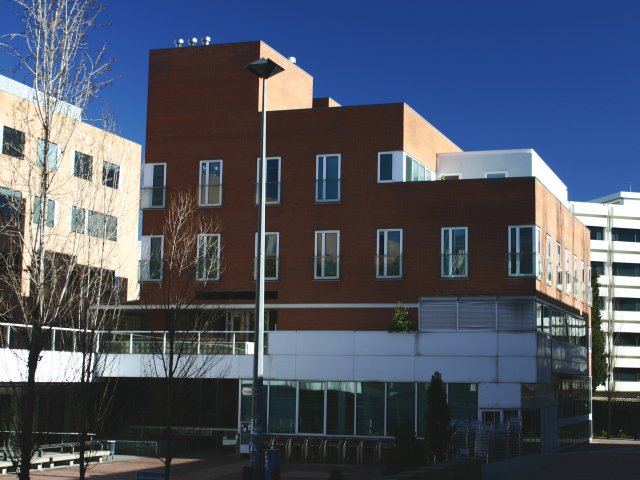
- Administration offices
- Established: 1976
- Academic affiliation: Universitat Politècnica de Catalunya
- Dean: José Fernández Ruzafa
- Students: 2106
- Postgraduates: 10170
- Location: Barcelona, Spain
- Website: https://www.fib.upc.edu

The Barcelona School of Informatics (Catalan: Facultat d'Informàtica de Barcelona, FIB; IPA: [fəkulˈtad dimfuɾˈmatikə ðə βəɾsəˈlonə]) is one of the schools of the Universitat Politècnica de Catalunya (Technical University of Catalonia), Spain. It was created in 1976, four years after the establishment of the university.

It is located in the north campus, and is the main school for computer science degrees.
