= Scandinavian Academy of Aeronautics =

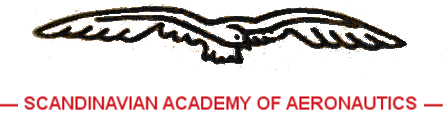

Scandinavian Academy of Aeronautics (Swedish: Skandinaviens Flygtekniska Akademi) was a Swedish accredited college specializing in aerospace engineering and avionics, situated in Gothenburg from 1973 and in Karlsborg from 1998 to 2003. The college was a major contributor of engineers and researchers in partnership with the aerospace industry, major airliners and other universities.

== History ==
Scandinavian Academy of Aeronautics was founded and opened by Runo Ewe-Ericson and Percival Ewe-Ericson in 1973 with its main campus situated in Bellmannsgatan 10, Gothenburg. For a short period in the mid 1990s its campus location was in Vestre Hamngatan, Gothenburg, before it moved to Karlsborg in 1998 until 2003. The number of students was radically reduced when the school moved to Karlsborg, and as co-founder and acting principal Percival Ewe-Ericson died in 2002 the school was closed down the following year. The shutdown led to the school filing a subpoena against the city of Karlsborg claiming they did not receive the funds promised for the establishing of the new campus.

In 2003 Lillian Syrene Ewe-Ericson founded an entity in cooperation with the Gothenburg Aviation Museum (Swedish: Göta Flygmuseum) to preserve the cultural heritage the school has contributed to Sweden's aeronautical history.

== Courses ==
Scandinavian Academy of Aeronautics offered a range of courses focused on aerospace engineering and avionics including:

- Aeronautics
- Combustion engine technologies
- Jet engine Construction
- Helicopter mechanics
- Water Engines and Pumps
- Machine theory
- Avionics
- Electronics
- General Chemistry
- Combustion chemistry
- Thermodynamics
- Computer Science
- Solid mechanics
- Materials science
- Production Technologies
- Mathematics
- Physics
- Technical English
- Technical drawing
- Business Economics
- Work Psychology and Management
- Ecology and Environmental Care

== Accreditations ==
- Accredited for financial support to students from the Swedish government.
- Accredited for financial support to students from the Norwegian government.
- Consultative body for Swedish government on qualified higher vocational education
- Accredited for financial support to students from Adlerbretska Premiestiftelsen

== Admissions ==
General admission requirements; senior high school graduate or equivalent.

== Principals ==
- Runo Ewe-Ericson
- Percival Ewe-Ericson
