= Centre de Formació Interdisciplinària Superior =

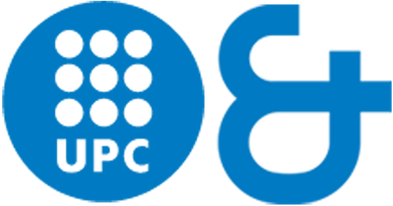
- CFIS logo (symbolizing the & symbol)
- Established: 1999
- Mission: Prepare excellent students
- President: Juanjo Rué Perna
- Owner: Polytechnic University of Catalonia
- Location: Barcelona, Spain
- Website: https://cfis.upc.edu

The Centre de Formació Interdisciplinària Superior (in English: Interdisciplinary Higher Education Centre), better known as CFIS, is a center of excellence associated with the Polytechnic University of Catalonia that allows excellent students to access a program of double degrees via an entrance exam.

It was created to "recruit, select and tutor students with sufficient capacity and motivation to pursue interdisciplinary studies within an innovative training offer that includes one or more of the undergraduate degrees that make up the offer of the Polytechnic University of Catalonia."

== History ==
The CFIS began as a pilot experience for a double degree in telecommunications and mathematics in 1999, and since 2003 it has been another center of the University that incorporates each course a very limited number of high-level students.

It has some 200 students (40 new ones each year), and CFIS graduates are found in the best academic institutions in the world and in renowned companies in the technological, financial and consulting fields.

In 2022, the Girl's Computer Science Olympiad was organized at CFIS.

== Notable alumni ==
- Ander Lamaisón, Spanish mathematician specializing in combinatorics
- Maria Bruna, Spanish mathematician, awarded a prize from the London Mathematical Society
- Joaquim Serra Montolí, Spanish mathematician, specialized in elliptic equations, partial and parabolic derivatives
- Marc Masdeu, Spanish number theorist
- Oriol Vinyals, machine learning researcher at Google DeepMind and technical lead Google Gemini, who was conferred the Degree of Doctor honoris causa on 26 November 2025
