= Polytechnic University of Catalonia =

Public university in Spain

Coordinates: 41°23′22″N 2°06′57″E

- Universitat Politècnica de Catalunya
- Type: Public
- Established: 1971
- Affiliations: Vives Network, UNITE!, SSU
- Endowment: €317 million
- Rector: Francesc Torres Torres
- Academic staff: 3,000+
- Students: 30,000+
- Location: Barcelona, Catalonia, Spain
- Website: www.upc.edu/en

University rankings

Global – Overall
- ARWU World: 701–800 (2023)
- QS World: =392 (2026)
- THE World: 601–800 (2024)
- USNWR Global: =385 (2023)

The Polytechnic University of Catalonia (Catalan: Universitat Politècnica de Catalunya, pronounced [uniβəɾsiˈtat puliˈtɛŋnikə ðə kətəˈluɲə], Spanish: Universidad Politécnica de Cataluña, UPC), currently referred to as BarcelonaTech, is one of the largest polytechnic universities in Spain. The majority of its Engineering Schools and Research facilities are consistently ranked as leading academic institutions in their fields in Europe.

It was established in 1971 as a result of different higher technical schools founded in the 18th century merging. Those schools include Industrial Engineers of Barcelona (ETSEIB) and Terrassa (ETSEIAT), the Higher Technical School of Architecture of Barcelona (ETSAB) and some research institutes.

As of 2025 it has 18 schools in Catalonia located in the cities of Barcelona, Castelldefels, Manresa, Sant Cugat del Vallès, Terrassa, and Vilanova i la Geltrú. As of the academic year 2024–25, the UPC has over 30,000 students and over 3,000 teaching and research staff, 67 undergraduate programs, 96 graduate programs and 46 doctorate programs.

UPC is a member of the Top Industrial Managers for Europe network, which allows for student exchanges between leading European engineering schools. It is also a member of several university federations, including the Conference of European Schools for Advanced Engineering Education and Research (CESAER) and UNITECH. UPC is also a parent institution of the Institut Barcelona d'Estudis Internacionals (IBEI).

== Rankings ==
Universitat Politècnica de Catalunya · BarcelonaTech (UPC) is a public university in Spain. In the 2025 QS World University Rankings by subject, it was ranked 97th worldwide in Engineering and Technology. Other rankings, such as EduRank, rank UPC as the best engineering university in Spain.

The QS World University Rankings also place UPC among the world's top 50 universities in disciplines such as architecture, civil engineering, electrical and electronic engineering, telecommunications engineering, instruments science and technology, and remote sensing.

According to the annual university ranking conducted by El Mundo, UPC is ranked first in Spain in fields such as civil engineering, computer science, and mechanical engineering.

== History ==
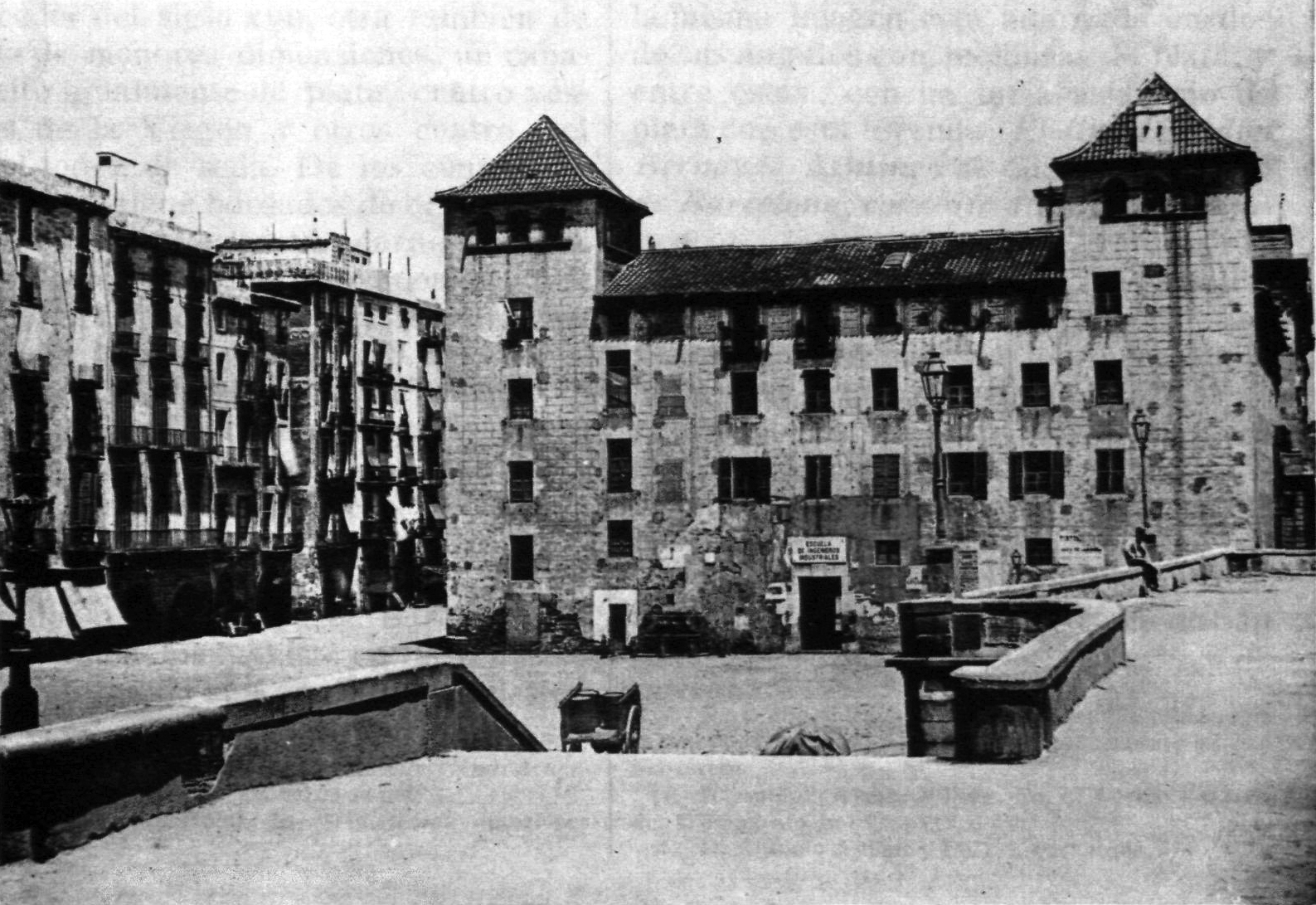
Old School of Industrial Engineers of Barcelona, housed in the former Convent of Sant Sebastià until its relocation in 1873

=== Instituto Politécnico Superior (1968–1971) ===
The university traces its origins to the foundation of the Polytechnic Higher Institute in 1968, which was formed by the merger in Barcelona of the state technical schools of Architecture and Engineering established in the mid-19th century. The institute was presided over by industrial and aeronautical engineer Víctor de Buen Lozano.

=== Polytechnic University of Barcelona (1971–1983) ===
In March 1971 the Polytechnic University of Barcelona (UPB) was established, initially comprising:

- the Superior Technical School of Industrial Engineering of Barcelona (ETSEIB)
- the Technical School of Industrial and Aeronautical Engineering of Terrassa (ETSEIT)
- the Technical School of Architecture of Barcelona (ETSAB)
- several affiliated research institutes

Its first rector was Víctor de Buen Lozano, former president of the Polytechnic Higher Institute. That same year saw the creation of the Technical School of Telecommunications Engineering of Barcelona (ETSETB) and the Institute of Educational Sciences (ICE-UPC).

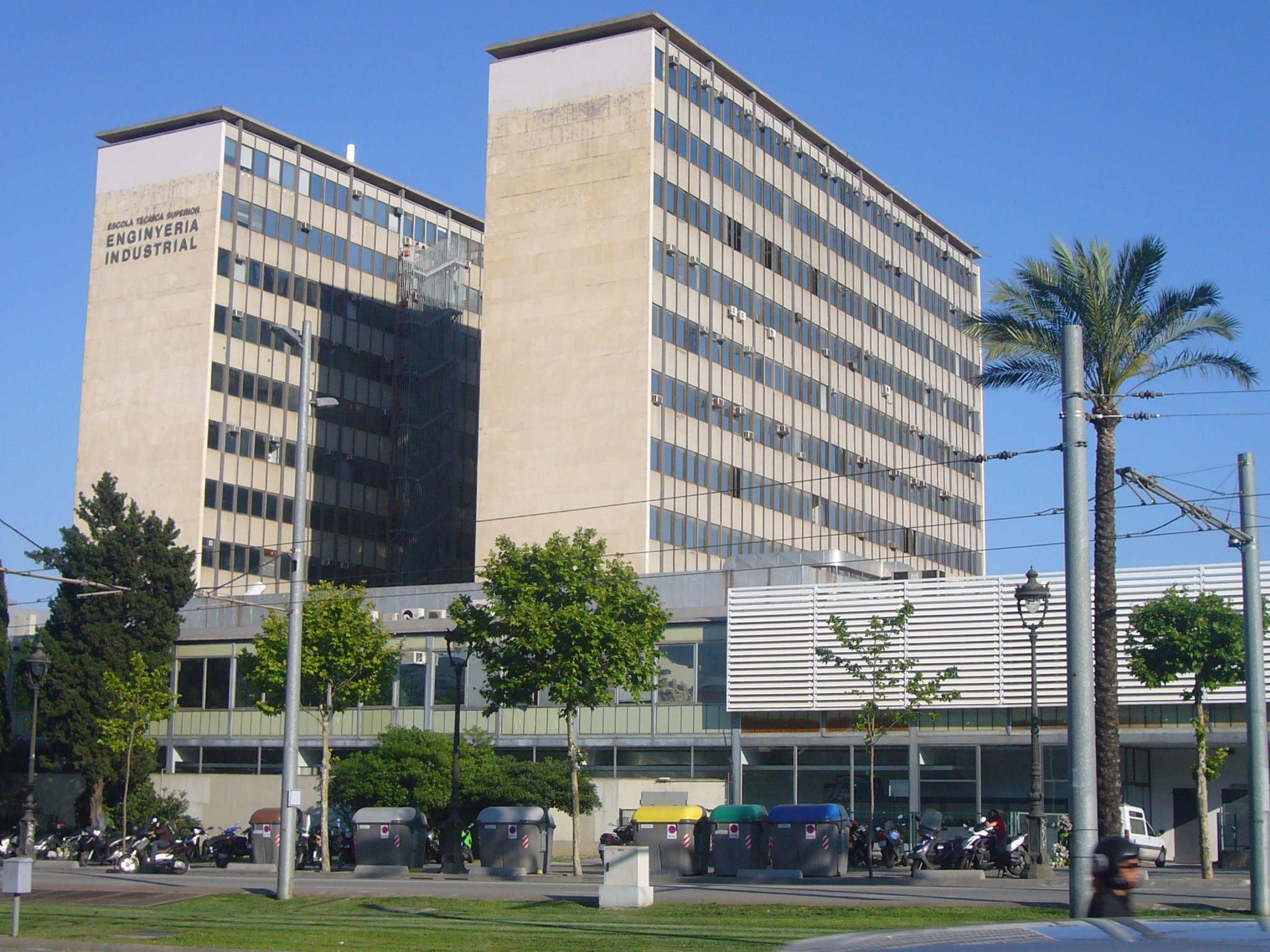
Technical School of Industrial Engineering of Barcelona (ETSEIB)

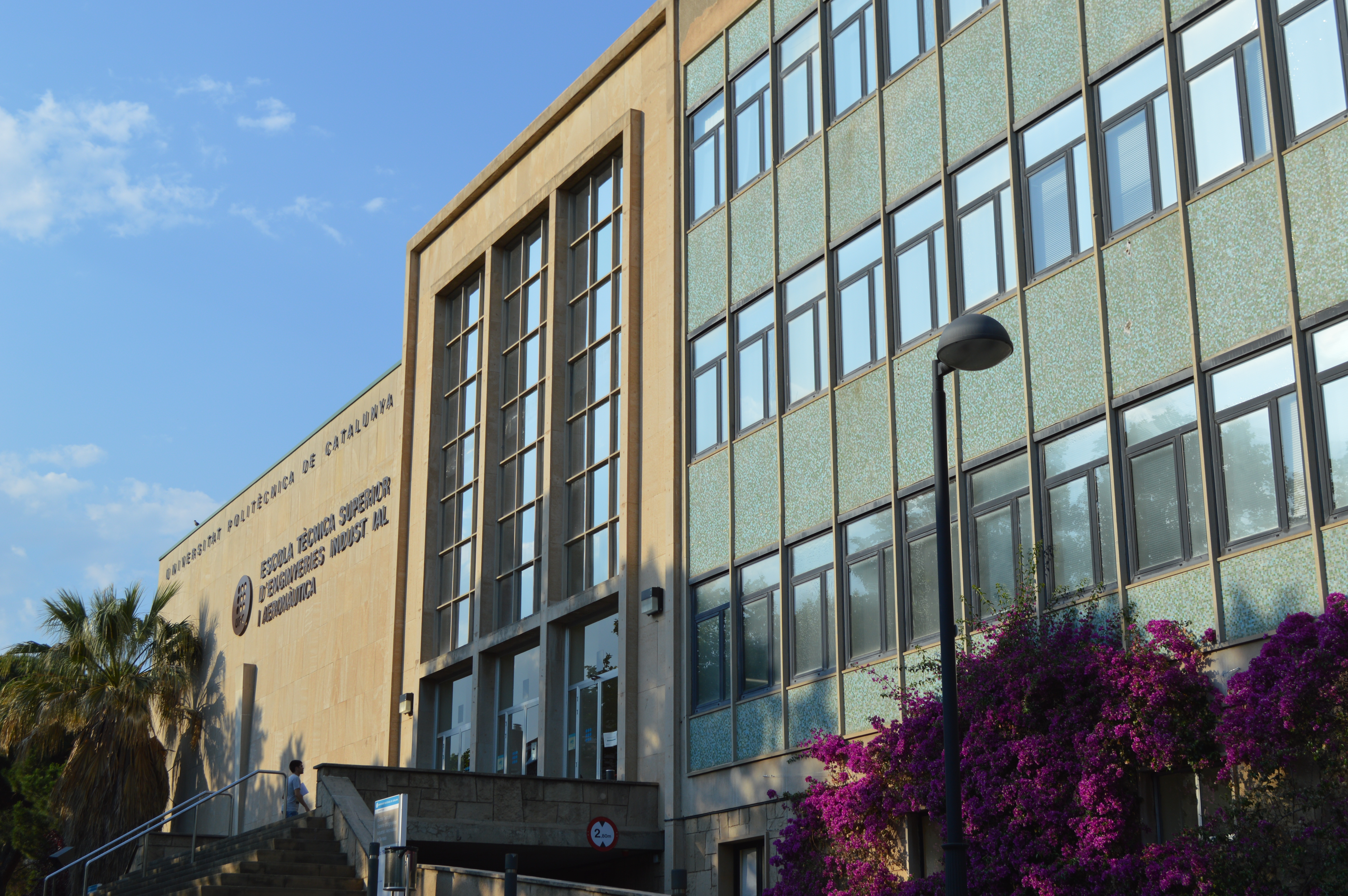
Technical School of Industrial and Aeronautical Engineering of Terrassa (ETSEIT; now ESEIAAT)

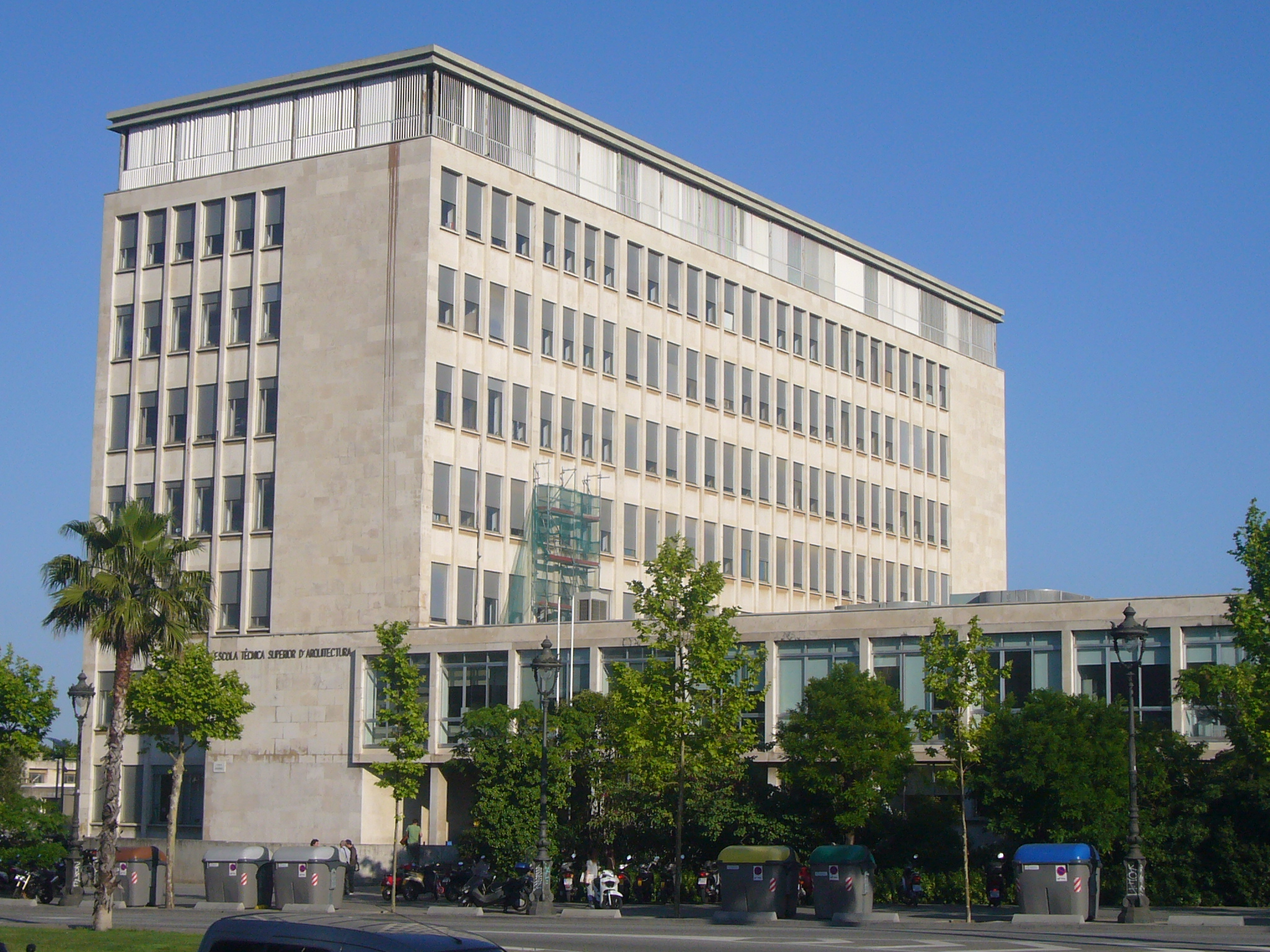
Technical School of Architecture of Barcelona (ETSAB)

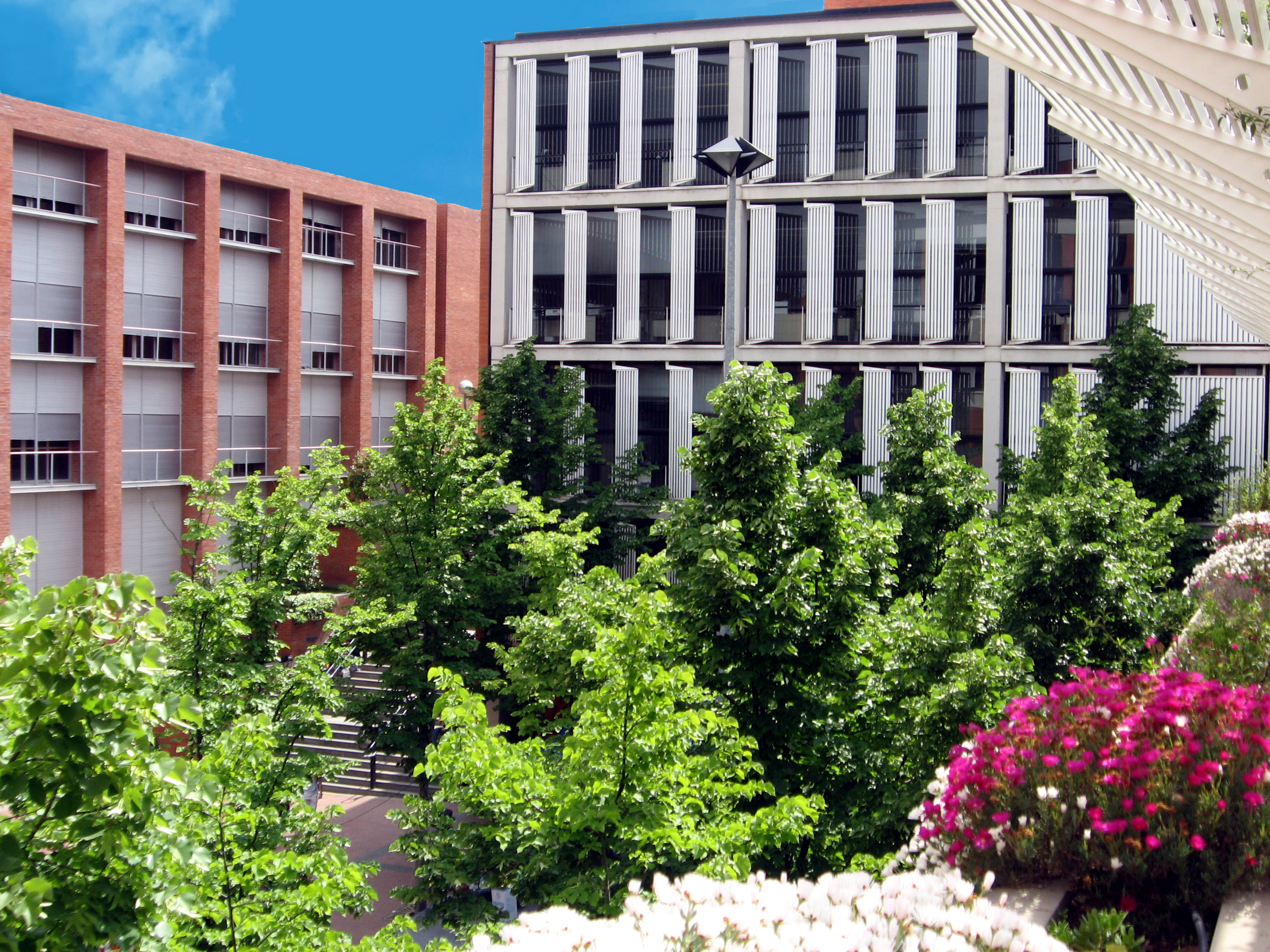
Technical School of Telecommunications Engineering of Barcelona (ETSETB)

In 1972 the University Schools of Technical Industrial Engineering at Terrassa (now the School of Engineering of Terrassa, EUETIT) and at Vilanova i la Geltrú (now EPSEVG), the University School of Technical Architecture of Barcelona (now EPSEB), and the University School of Technical Mining Engineering of Manresa (which that year was renamed Polytechnic University School of Manresa, EUPM, now EPSEM) were integrated into the UPB. That year also saw the establishment of the University Schools of Technical Agricultural Engineering at Girona and Lleida; Girona's school soon became a full Polytechnic University School, and Lleida began offering first- and second-cycle courses. In December 1972 Gabriel Ferraté Pascual succeeded Víctor de Buen Lozano as rector.

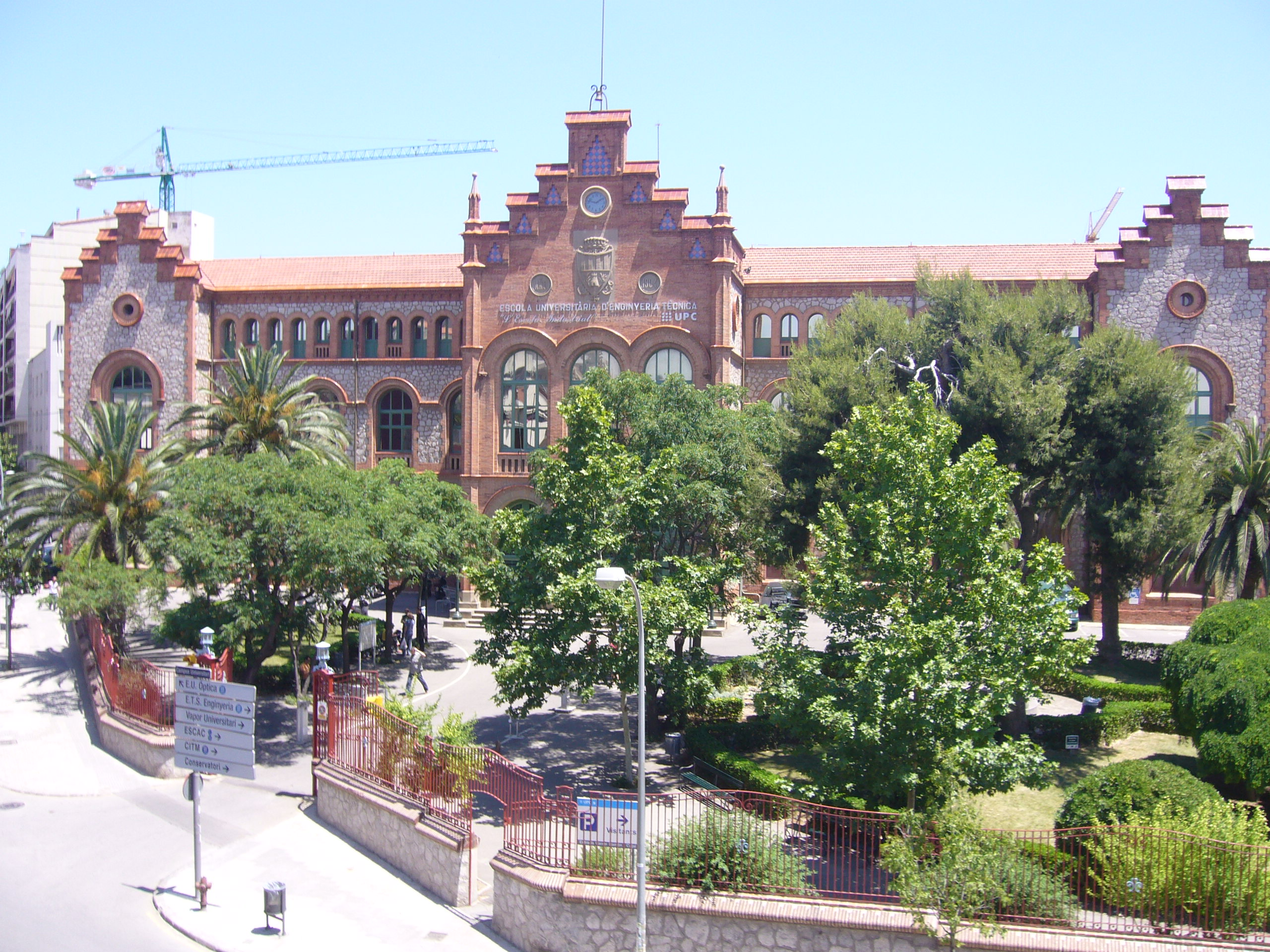
School of Engineering of Terrassa (EUETIT)

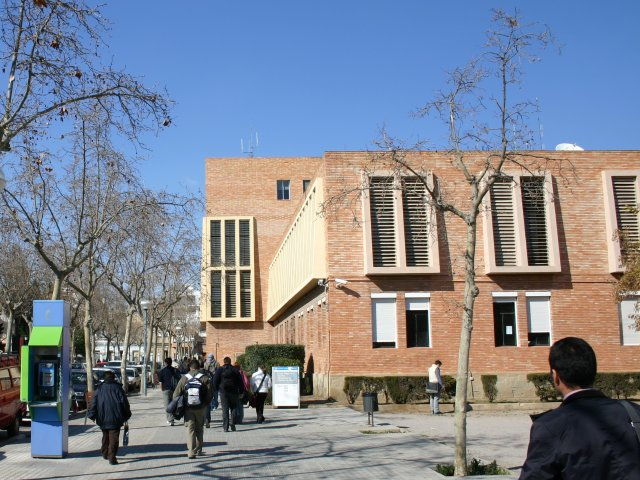
EPSEVG (School of Engineering of Vilanova i la Geltrú)

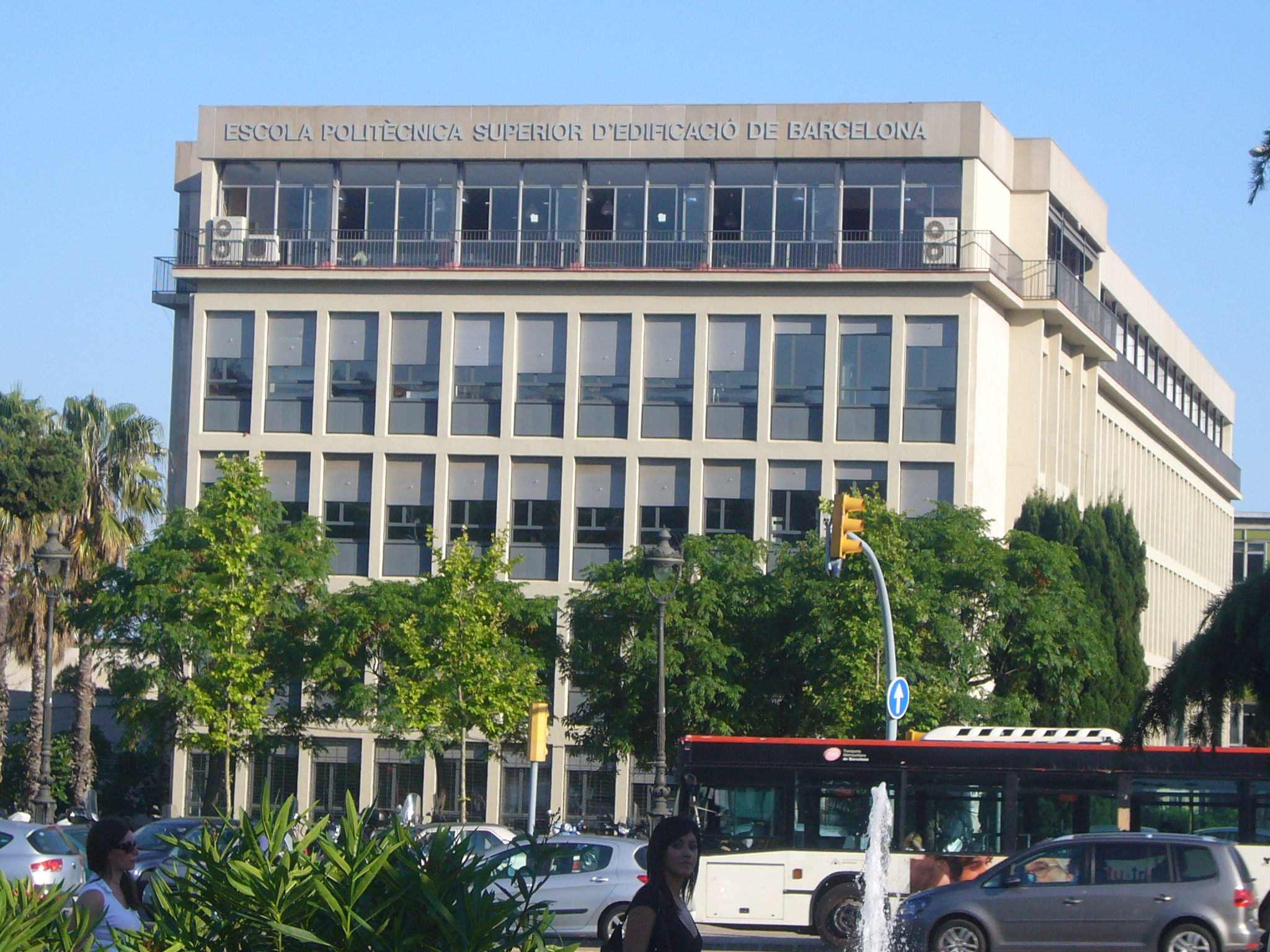
EPSEB (School of Building Engineering of Barcelona)

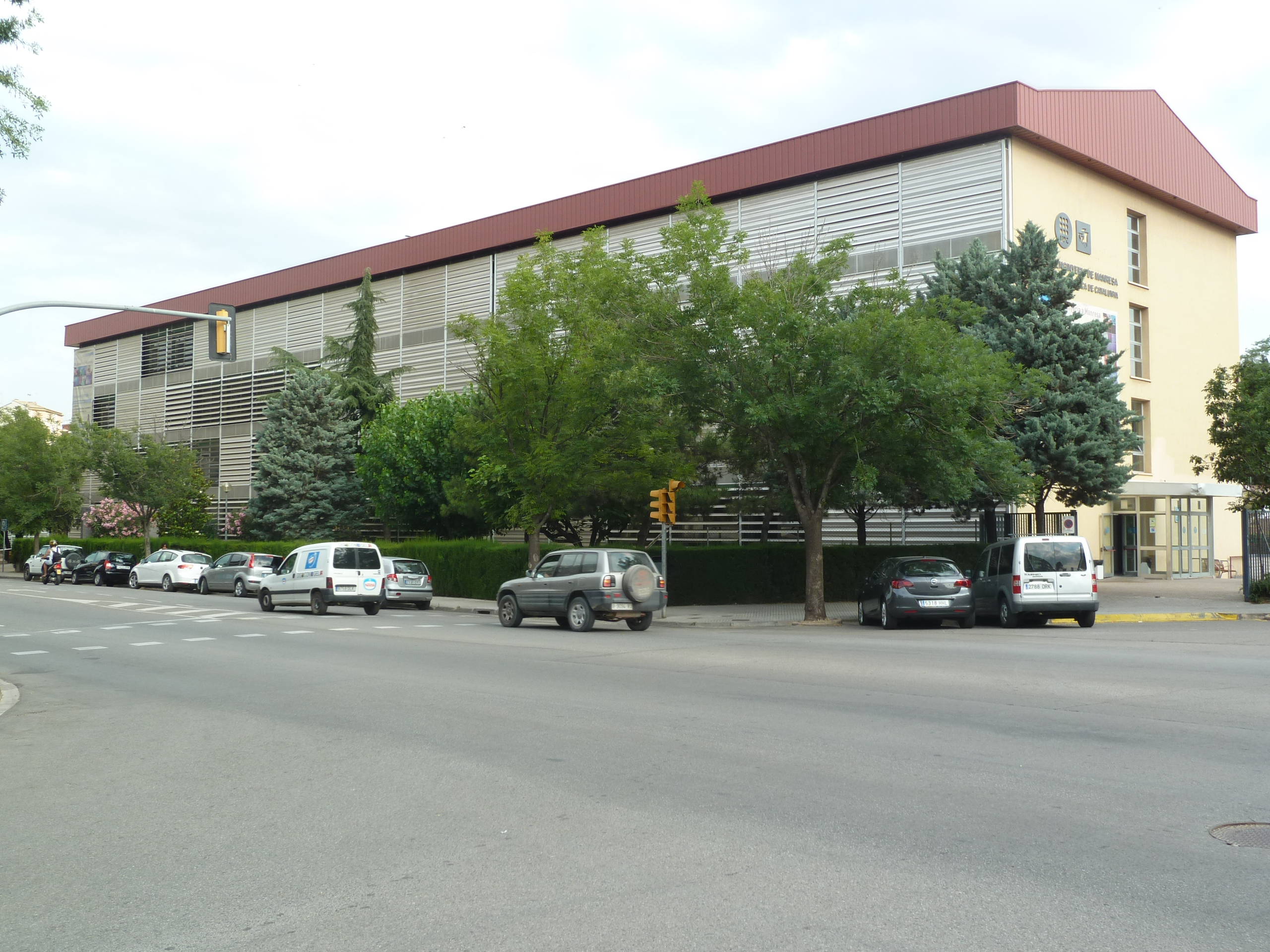
EUPM (now EPSEM)

In 1974 the Technical School of Civil Engineering of Barcelona (ETSECCPB) opened. In March 1976 the Faculty of Informatics of Barcelona (FIB) was founded, and Julián Fernández Ferrer was elected rector, succeeding Gabriel Ferraté, who had been appointed Director General of Universities and Research in Madrid. Also in 1977 the University School of Optics (EUOOT) opened in Terrassa by ministerial order.

In 1978 Gabriel Ferraté was re-elected rector, serving until 1994. In 1979 the Technical School of Architecture of the Vallès (ETSAV) opened in the Sabadell-Terrassa area; it moved to Sant Cugat del Vallès in 1991.

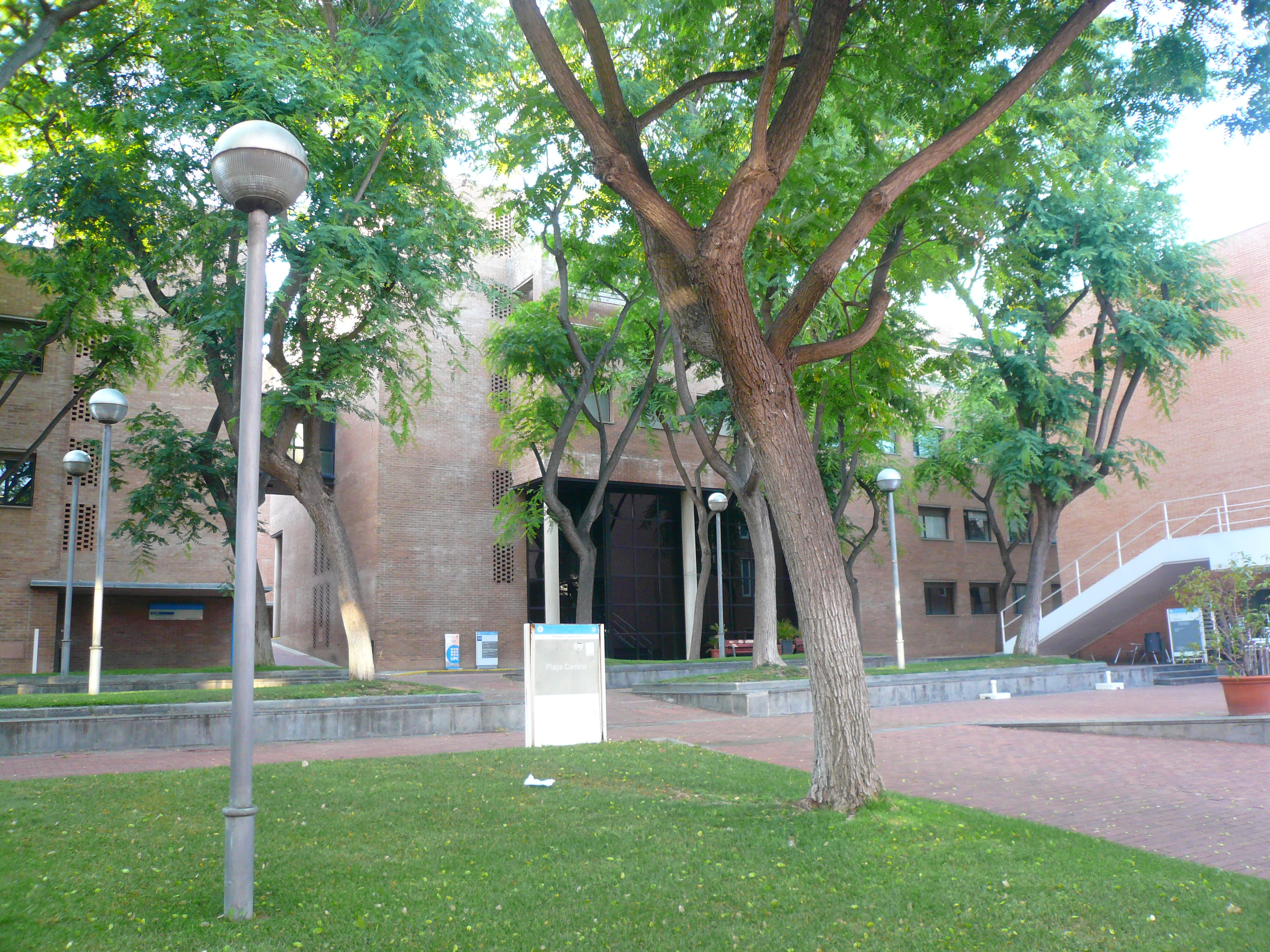
Technical School of Civil Engineering of Barcelona (ETSECCPB)

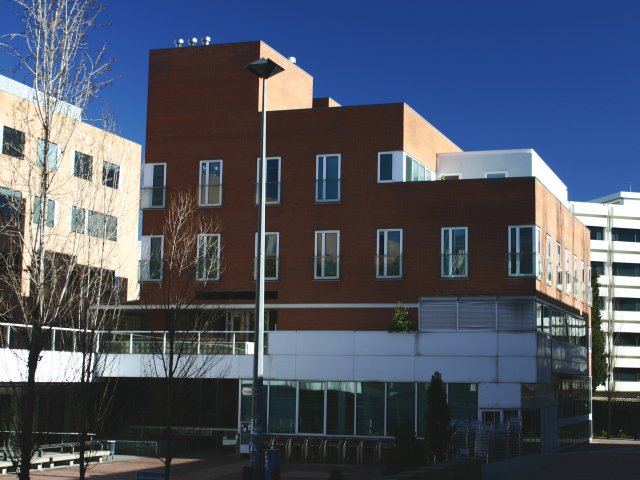
Faculty of Informatics of Barcelona (FIB)

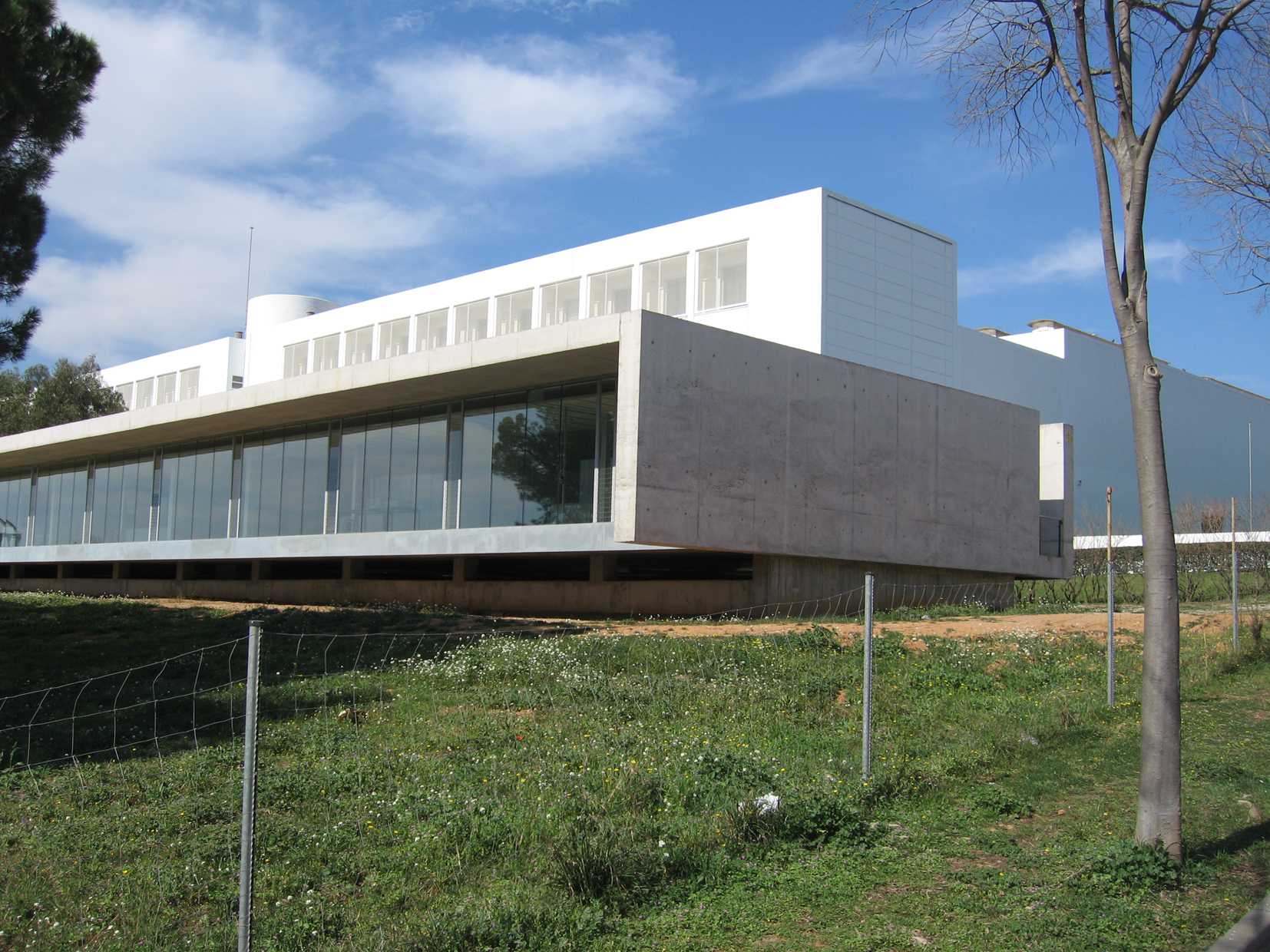
Technical School of Architecture of the Vallès (ETSAV)

=== Polytechnic University of Catalonia (1983–present) ===
On 4 July 1983 Spain's University Reform Act (LRU 232/1985) paved the way for new statutes, and in 1984 the institution was officially renamed the Polytechnic University of Catalonia (UPC). On 19 December 1984 the Parliament of Catalonia established university coordination laws and social councils, appointing Pere Duran Farell as the first President of the UPC Social Council.

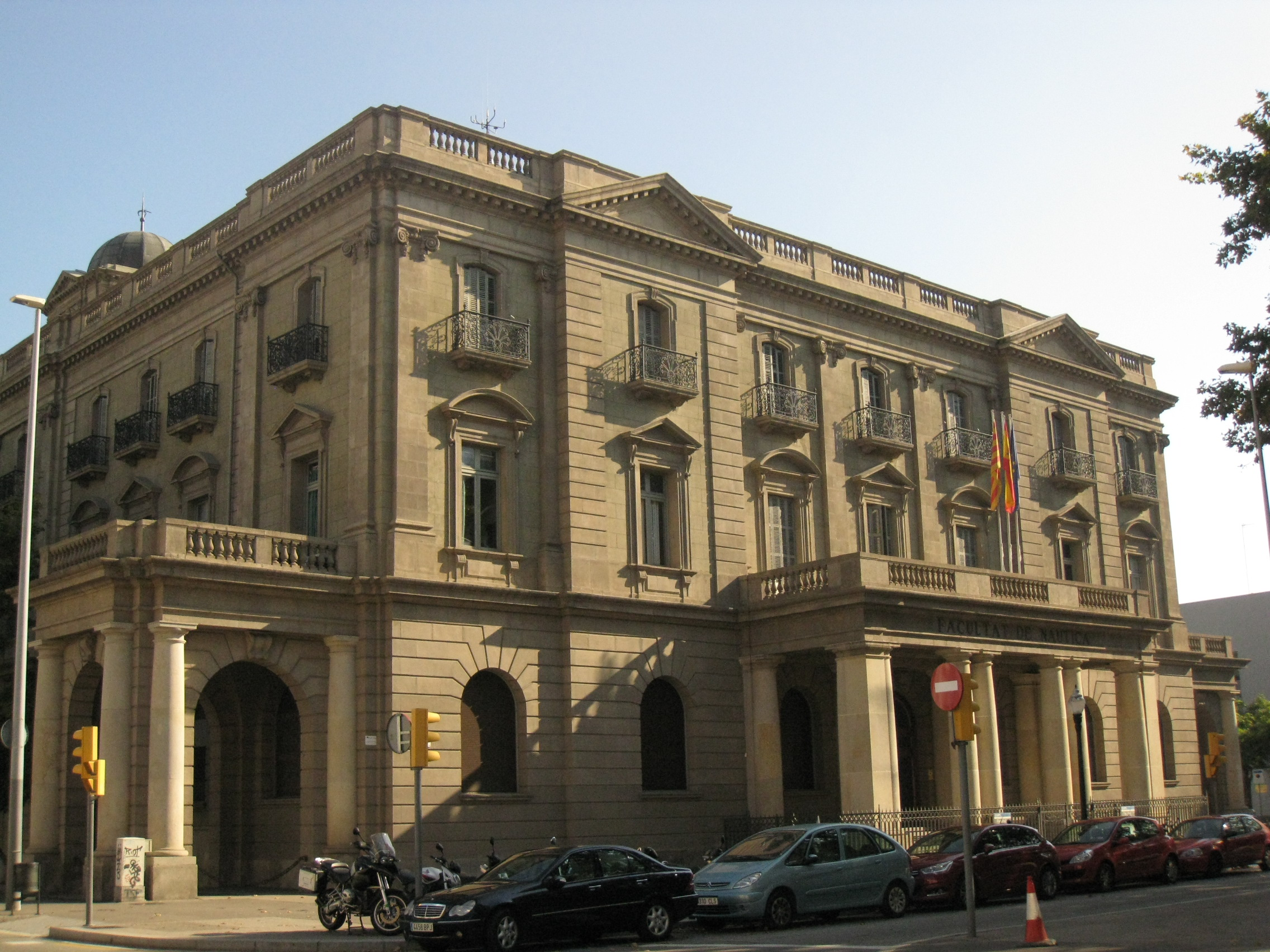
The Faculty of Nautical Studies of Barcelona (FNB) joined the UPC in 1990.

In 1990 the School of Civil Marine Engineering became the Faculty of Nautical Studies (FNB). In 1991 the Polytechnic University School of the Baix Llobregat opened (later EPSC in Castelldefels), and in 1992 the Faculty of Mathematics and Statistics (FME) was established; that year the UPC schools in Girona and Lleida joined the newly founded University of Girona and University of Lleida respectively.

In 1994 Gabriel Ferraté stepped down to become first rector of the Open University of Catalonia; Jaume Pagès i Fita succeeded him as rector and Xavier Llobet Colom became President of the Social Council. That year saw the founding of Edicions UPC and the Politècnica Foundation, and the opening of the School of Photography in Terrassa. In 1996 the Rector Gabriel Ferraté Library opened at the Diagonal Nord Campus. The UPC also began integrating two Barcelona provincial schools—EUETIB and EUETAB—into its system.

In 1998 the Multimedia School in Terrassa opened and later merged with the School of Photography to form the Centre for Image and Multimedia Technology (CITM). Expansion continued with new campuses in Manresa and Castelldefels, and the creation of the Barcelona Industrial School Consortium (CEIB). UPCnet, the university's Internet service, launched the same year.

In 2000 the technology centres at Vilanova i la Geltrú and Manresa began operations. In September 2001 the first building of the Mediterranean Technology Park opened at Baix Llobregat, followed in October by the Barcelona Technology Park at Diagonal Sud. That year the Baix Llobregat School was renamed EPSC and in 2010 became the School of Telecommunications and Aerospace Engineering of Castelldefels (EETAC).

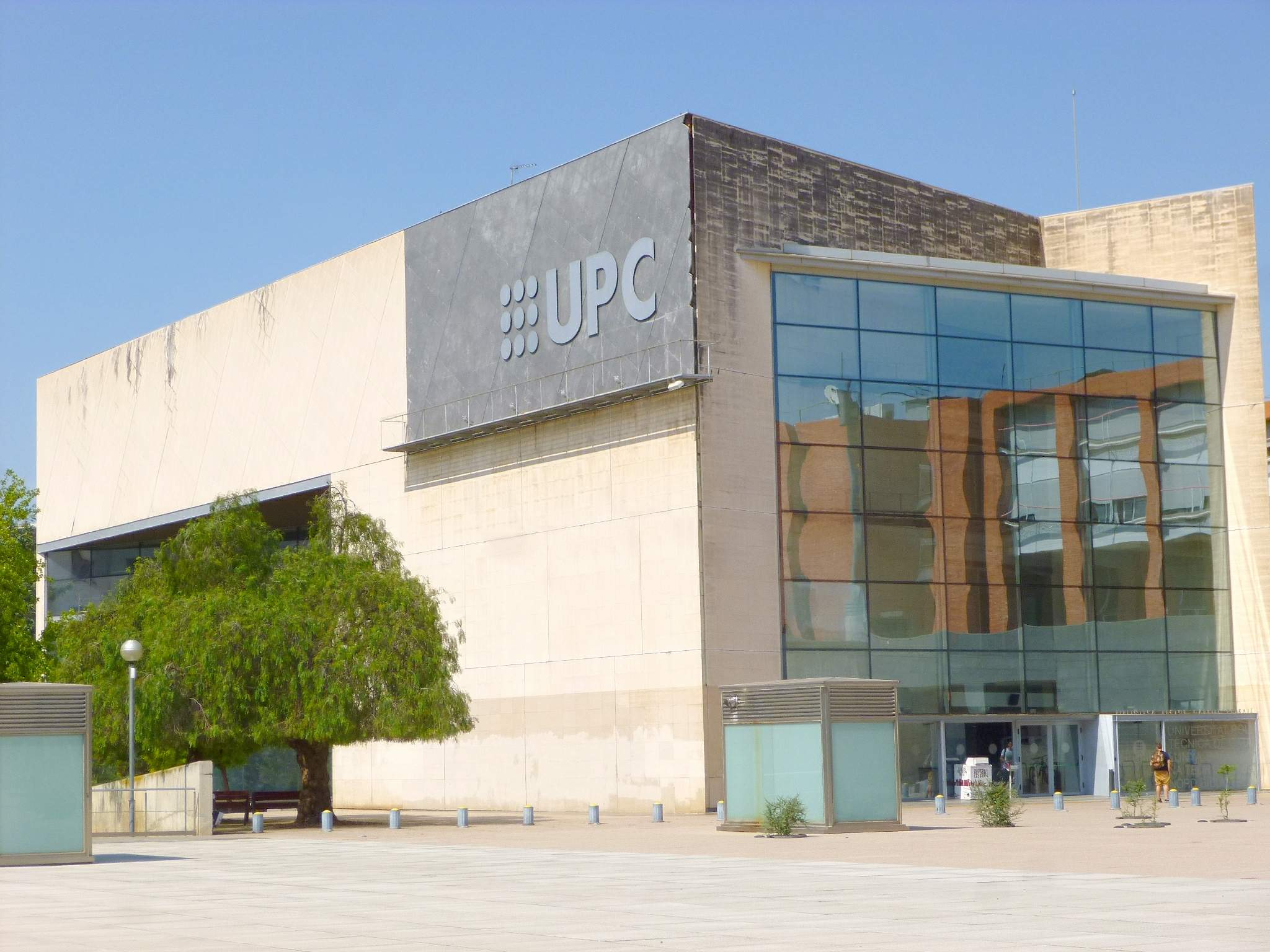
Rector Gabriel Ferraté Library

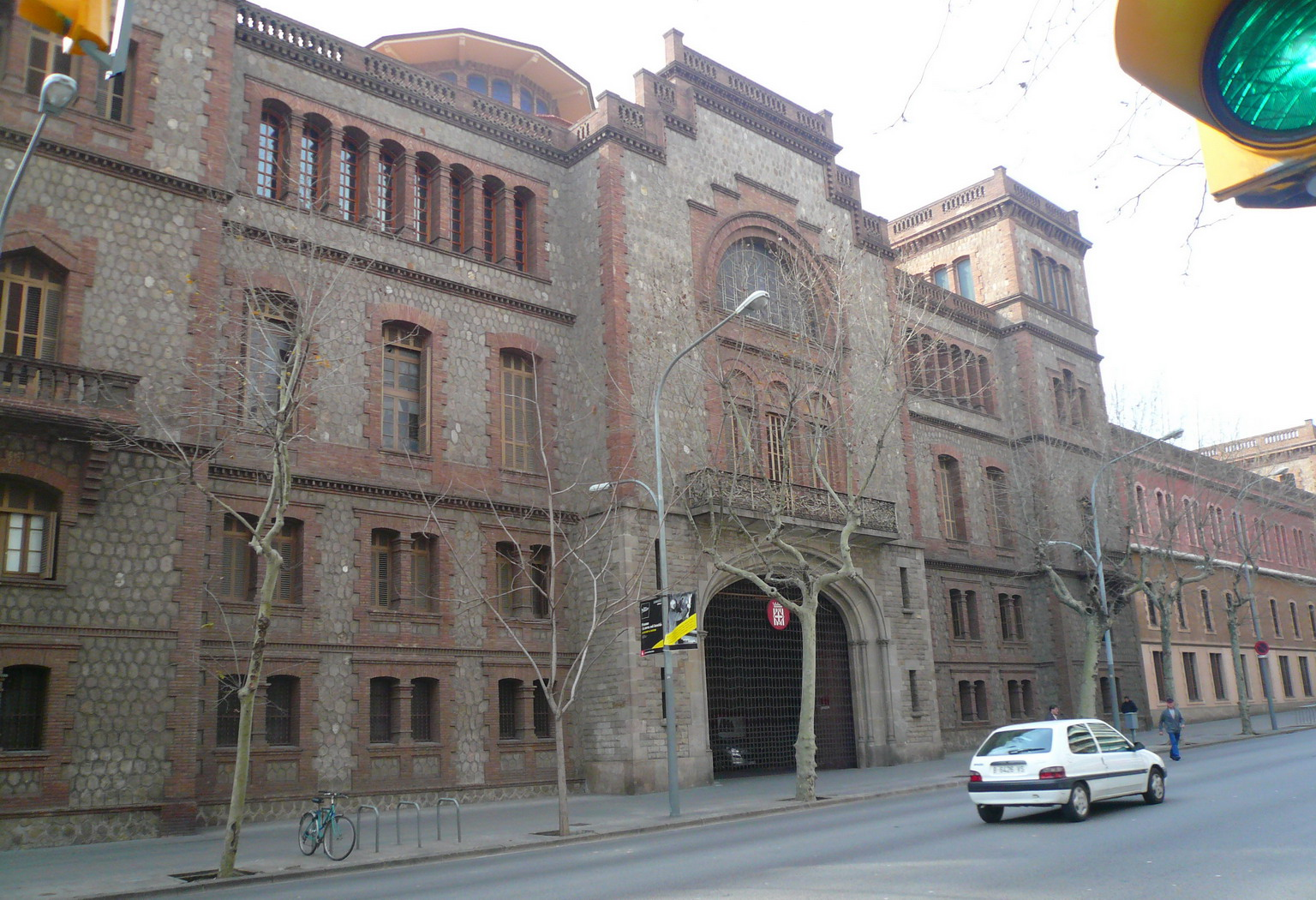
EUETIB (School of Technical Industrial Engineering of Barcelona)

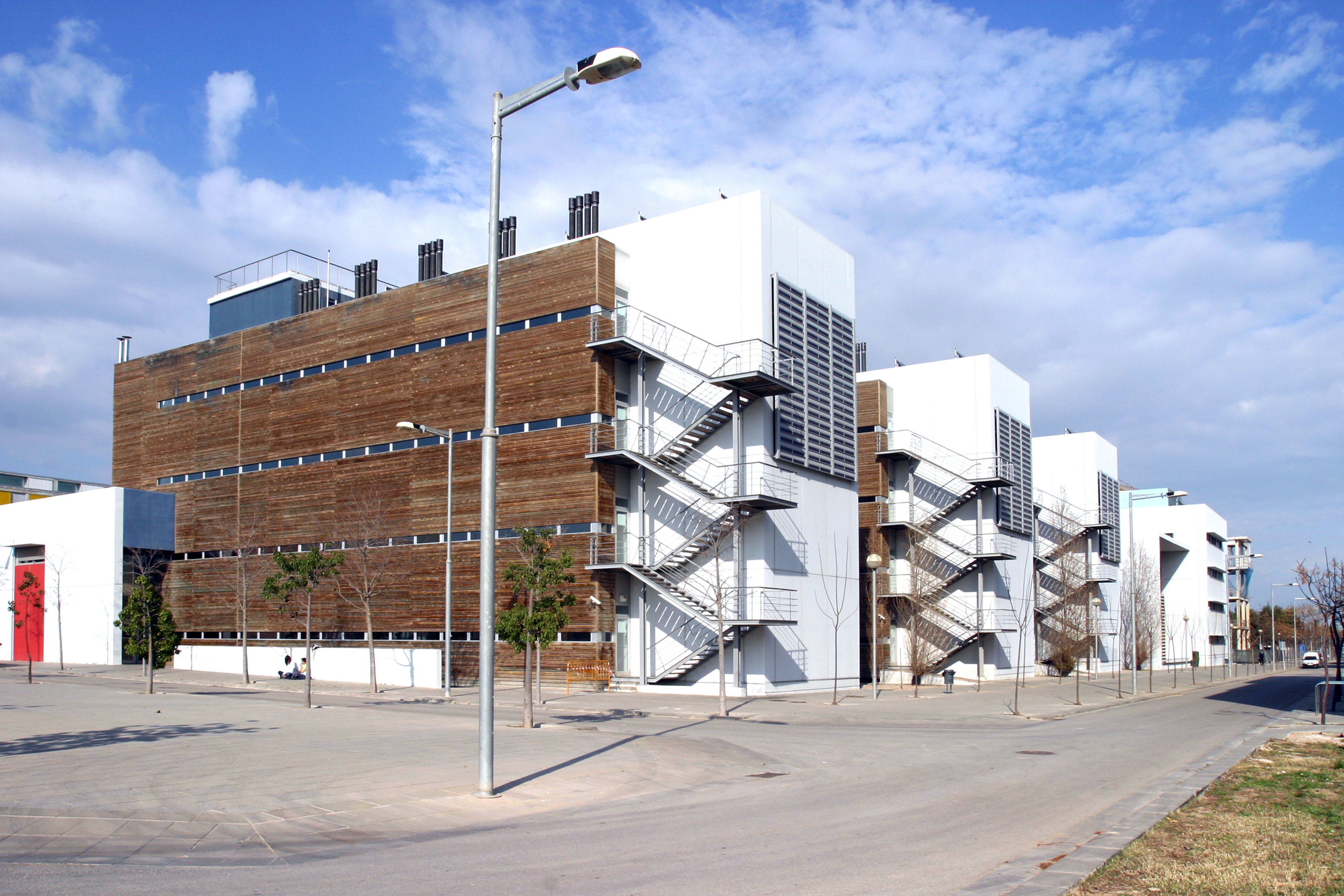
EPSC (now EETAC)

In 2002 Josep Ferrer Llop was elected rector under a universal weighted suffrage system, and Joaquim Molins became President of the Social Council. On 12 February 2003 the Parliament of Catalonia approved the Universities Law (LUC), and in May the UPC Senate ratified new statutes. A collaboration agreement with the Department of Universities, Research and Information Society (DURSI) initiated curricula adaptation to the European Higher Education Area from 2004. In 2003 the Centre for Interdisciplinary Higher Education (CFIS) was founded at the Diagonal Sud Campus.

In 2004 UPC hosted the first International Conference on Higher Education organised by the Global University Network for Innovation (GUNI), subsequently held biennially. In January 2005 the second phase of the Omega Building opened at Diagonal Nord, and the MareNostrum supercomputer was installed in the Torre Girona chapel, co-managed by the Barcelona Supercomputing Center, UPC, the Spanish Ministry of Education and Science, and DURSI. Meanwhile, the Baix Llobregat campus opened new facilities for EUETAB and the Institute of Photonic Sciences (ICFO), and Manresa inaugurated a combined university library. In Villanova i la Geltrú the city council granted space in the Neàpolis building for the technology centre and EPSEVG, while ETSAV opened its Technology Transfer Centre (CRITT).

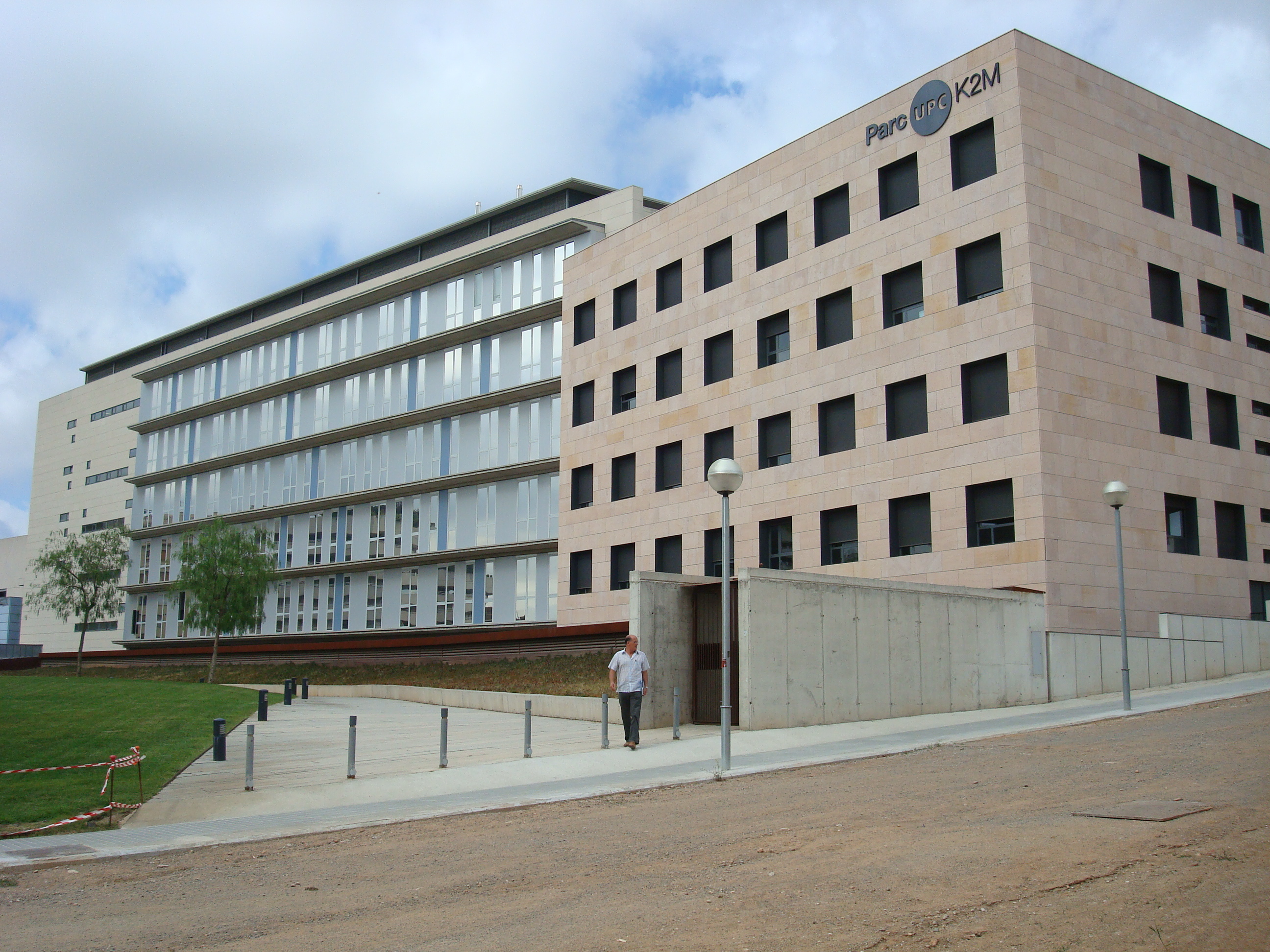
Omega Building

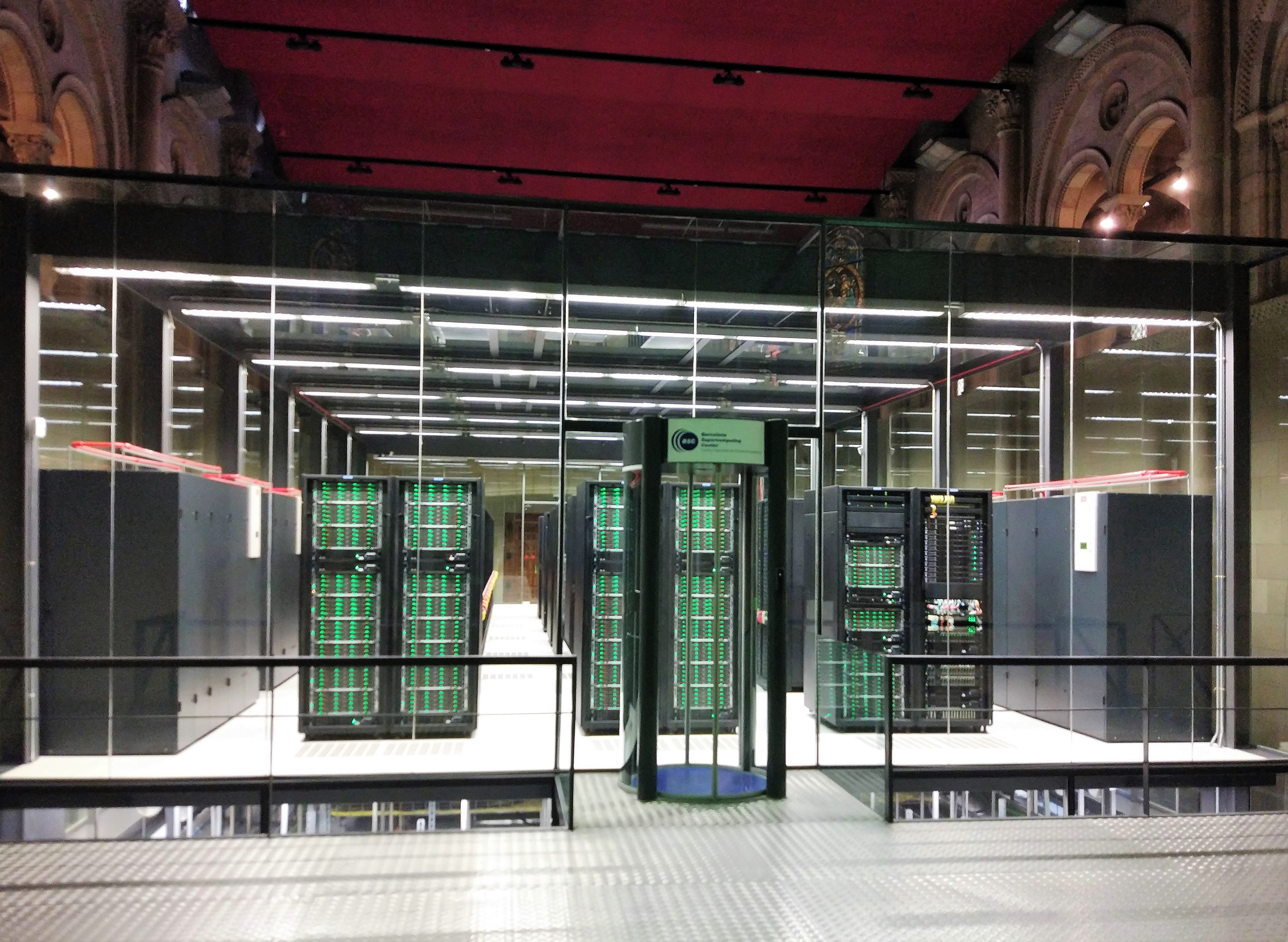
MareNostrum supercomputer

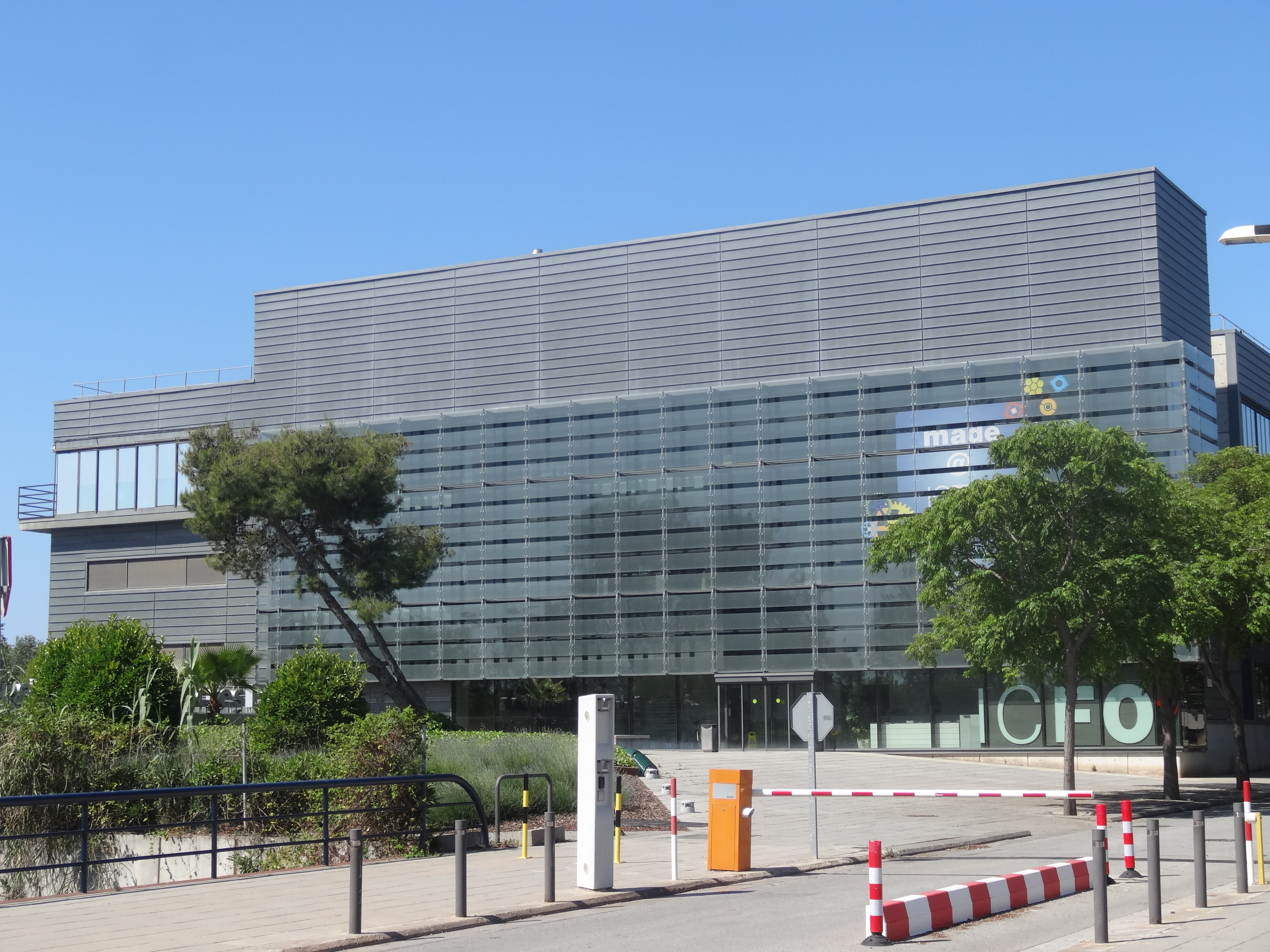
Institute of Photonic Sciences (ICFO)

=== 2006–2010 ===
In March 2006, Professor Antoni Giró Roca was elected rector, which brought forth the adoption of the European Higher Education Area and the launch of the "Horizon 2010" Research and Innovation Plan. Over the next five years the UPC:

- Approved its first EHEA-adapted master's programmes (academic year 2006–07).
- Launched the online newsletter e-informacions and relaunched its print magazine Informacions (2007).
- Fully integrated the Barcelona School of Agricultural Engineering (2008) and upgraded its North Campus façades along Carrer Jordi Girona.
- Opened its Brussels office to strengthen ties with the European Commission (2009).
- Laid the foundation stone for the Diagonal-Besòs Campus (December 2009).
- Founded the Innovation and Technology Centre (CIT UPC) (2010), inaugurated the Agrópolis agri-food hub in Viladecans (2010), assumed the presidency of the Vives University Network, and saw the Castelldefels School of Technology renamed EETAC.

=== 2011–present ===
Since 2011 the UPC has continued expanding its research infrastructure, global partnerships, and campus life:

- 2011: Inauguration of the Nanoengineering Research Centre (CRNE) on the Barcelona Knowledge Campus.
- 2013–2015: Opening of the K2M Building and ICFO facilities, and Barcelona Knowledge Campus's designation as an International Campus of Excellence.
- 2023: Installation and inauguration of MareNostrum 5 at the Barcelona Supercomputing Center, reinforcing the UPC's leadership in high-performance computing.
- 2024: Approval of the new UPC Statutes under the European university alliance UNITE!
- 2025: Presentation of IRIS, the UPC's new Research and Innovation in Health Institute.
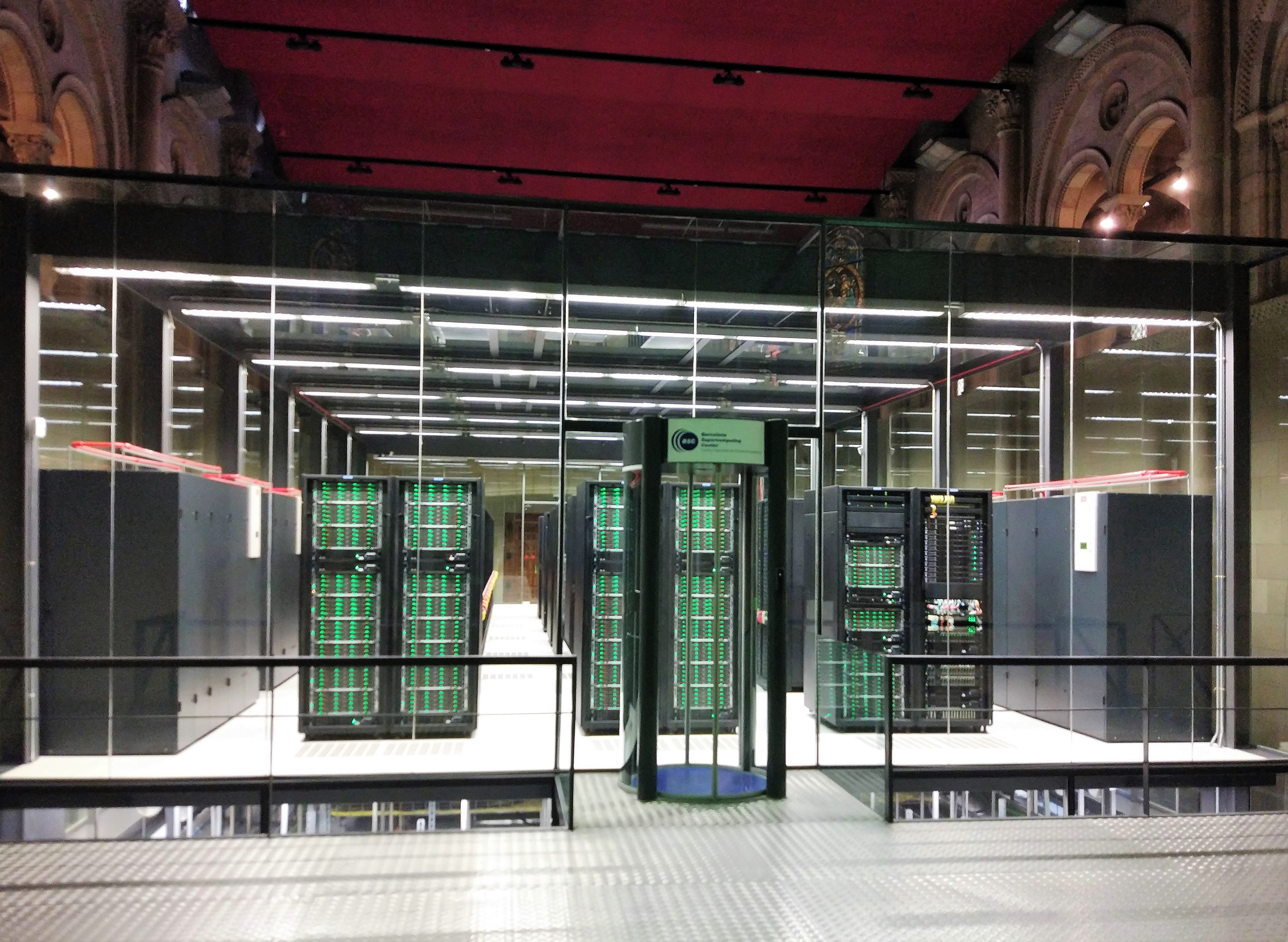
MareNostrum 5 supercomputer inauguration (2023)

== Notable alumni ==
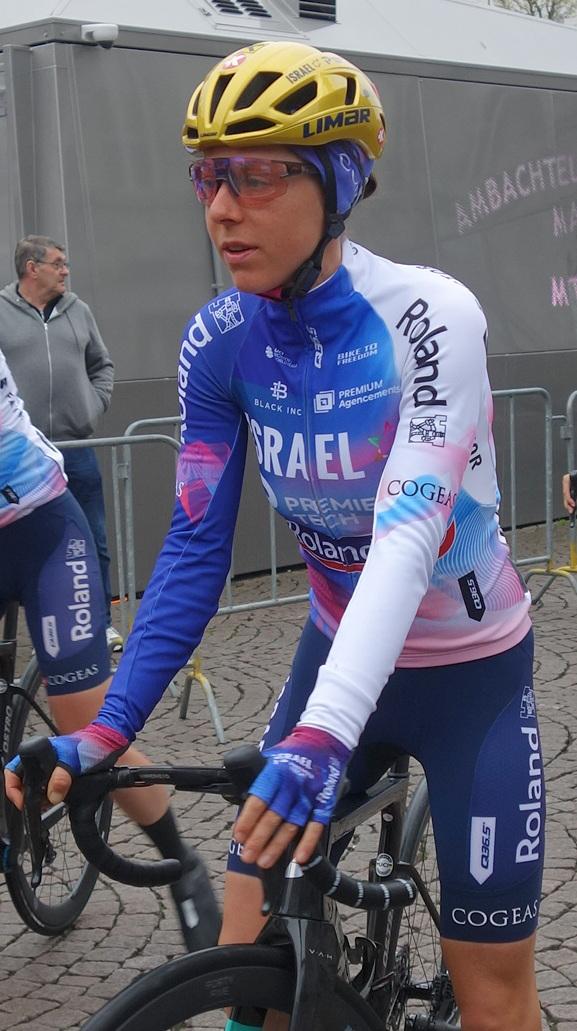
Anna Kiesenhofer

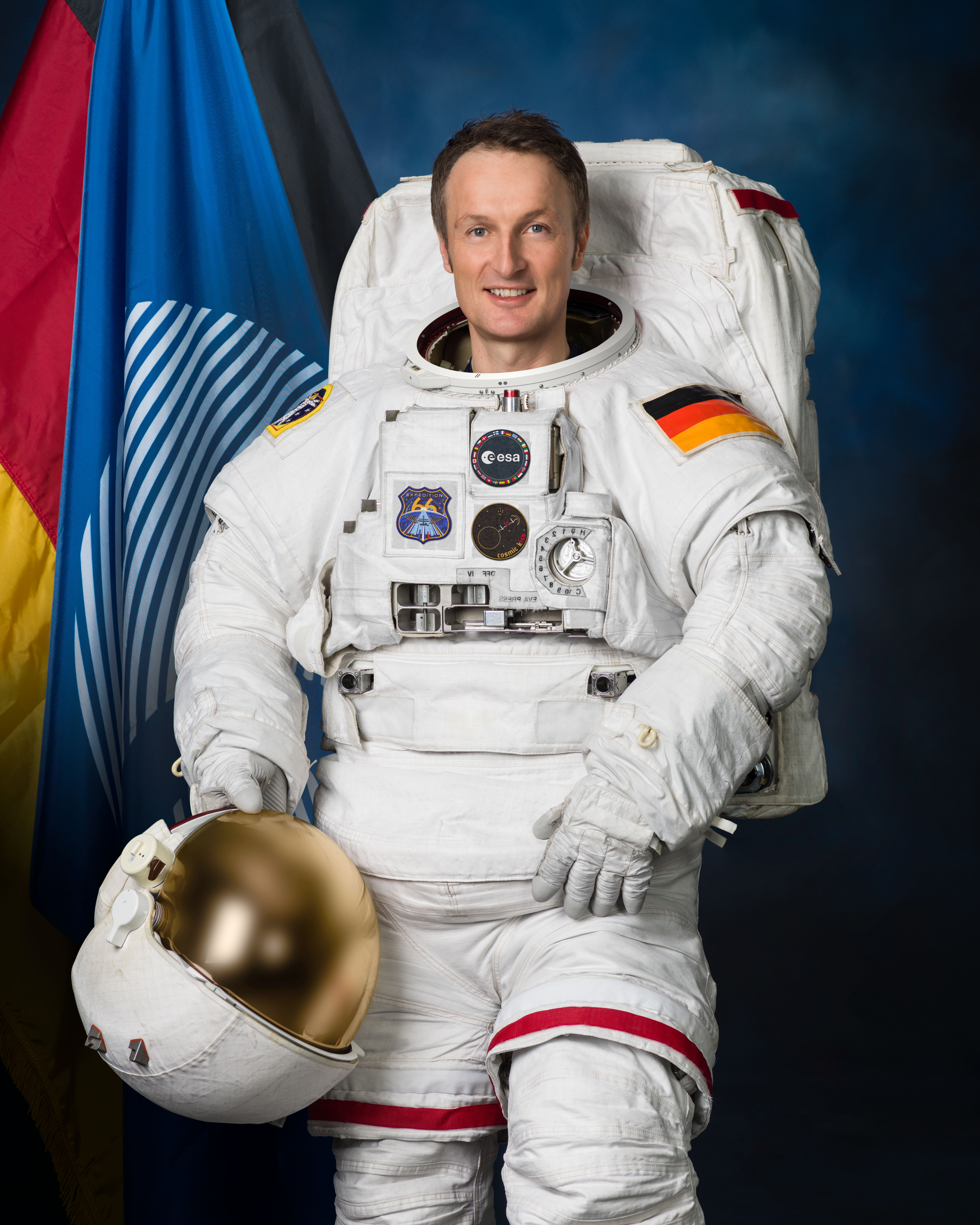
Matthias Maurer

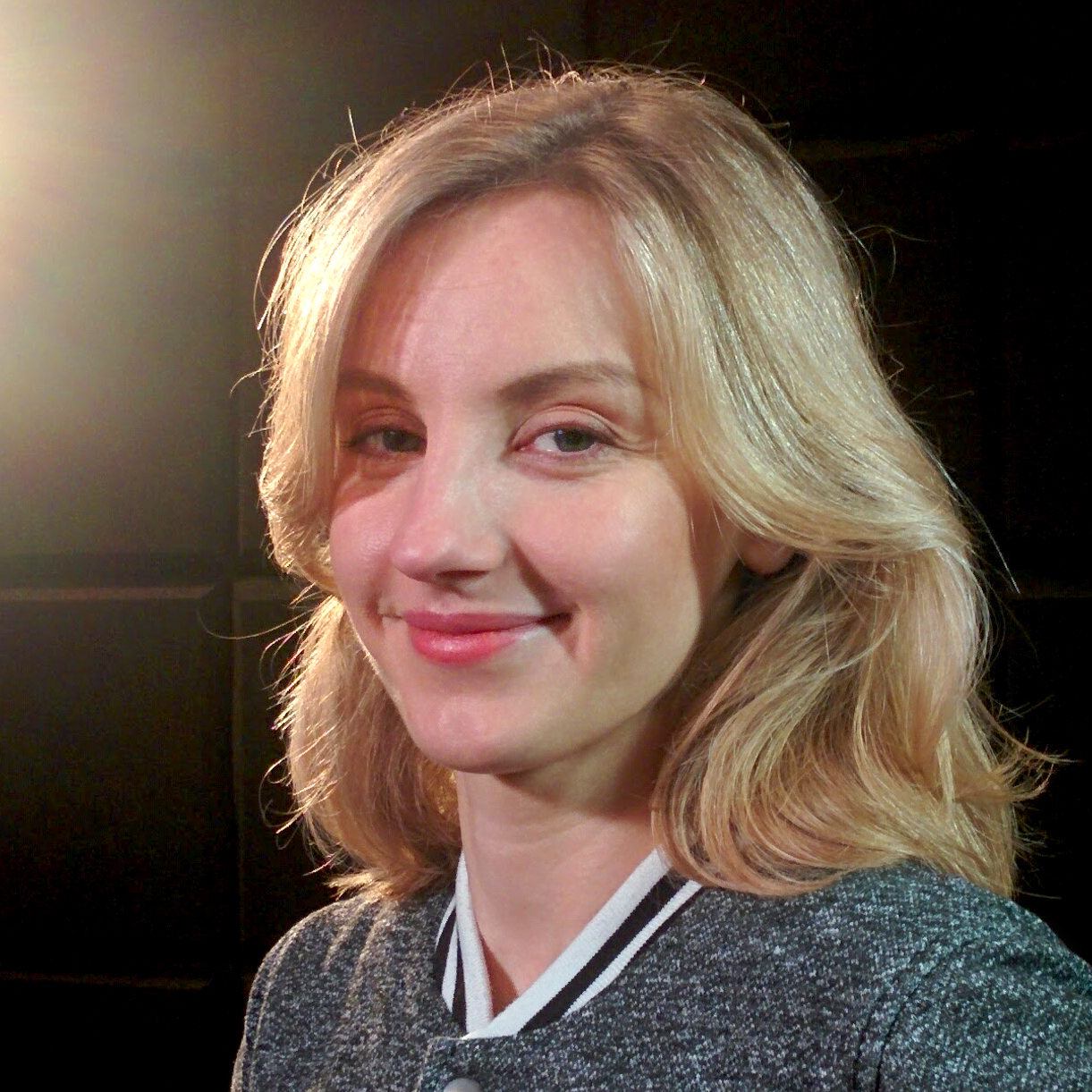
Olga Malinkiewicz
- Jordi Rodríguez-Amat (born 2 November 1944), president of the Rogriguez-Amat Foundation and professor at the University of Barcelona.
- Anna Kiesenhofer (born 14 February 1991), Austrian professional cyclist and mathematician; Tokyo 2020 Olympic gold medalist in the women's road race; PhD in mathematics from the UPC.
- Matthias Maurer (born 18 March 1970), German ESA astronaut and materials scientist; selected for SpaceX Crew-3 to the ISS; studied materials science at UPC.
- Olga Malinkiewicz (born 26 November 1982), Polish physicist, inventor and entrepreneur; co-founder and CTO of Saule Technologies; developed inkjet-printed perovskite solar cells; UPC alumna.
- Oriol Vinyals (born 1983), Spanish machine-learning researcher at DeepMind; co-inventor of the seq2seq model; studied telecommunications engineering at UPC.
- Mateo Valero Cortés (born 1952), Spanish computer architect; founding director of the Barcelona Supercomputing Center (home of MareNostrum); PhD in telecommunications engineering from UPC.
- Carme Pigem Barceló (born 8 April 1962), Spanish architect; co-founder of the Pritzker Prize–winning firm RCR Arquitectes; studied at UPC's ETSAV.
- Roger Torrent i Ramió (born 19 July 1979), Catalan politician and urban planner; President of the Parliament of Catalonia (2018–2021); UPC postgraduate in territorial and urban studies.
- Pere Navarro Olivella (born 25 May 1952), Spanish civil servant and politician; Director-General for Traffic since 2018; degree in industrial engineering from UPC.
- Josep Roca i Soler (b. 19XX), engineer and co-founder of Roca, studied industrial engineering at the UPC.

== Schools ==
- Barcelona East School of Engineering (EEBE)
- Castelldefels School of Telecommunications and Aerospace Engineering (EETAC)
- Barcelona School of Building Construction (EPSEB)
- Manresa School of Engineering (EPSEM)
- Vilanova i la Geltrú School of Engineering (EPSEVG)
- Barcelona School of Agricultural Engineering (ESAB)
- Terrassa School of Industrial, Aerospace and Audiovisual Engineering (ESEIAAT)
- Barcelona School of Architecture (ETSAB)
- Vallès School of Architecture (ETSAV)
- Barcelona School of Civil Engineering (ETSECCPB)
- School of Industrial Engineering of Barcelona (ETSEIB)
- Barcelona School of Informatics (FIB)
- Barcelona School of Telecommunications Engineering (ETSETB)
- School of Mathematics and Statistics (FME)
- Barcelona School of Nautical Studies (FNB)
- Terrassa School of Optics and Optometry (FOOT)
- Interdisciplinary Higher Education Centre (CFIS)
- Image Processing and Multimedia Technology Centre (CITM)

Affiliated Schools

- Institut Barcelona d'Estudis Internacionals (IBEI)
- Euncet University Business School (EUNCET)
- EAE University Business School (EAE)

== UPC UNESCO Chairs ==
- Càtedra UNESCO de Direcció Universitària (CUDU) – UNESCO Chair of Higher Education Management
- Càtedra UNESCO de Mètodes Numèrics en Enginyeria de la UPC – UNESCO Chair of Numerical Methods in Engineering
- Càtedra UNESCO de Sostenibilitat – UNESCO Sustainability Chair
- Càtedra UNESCO en Salut Visual i Desenvolupament – UNESCO Chair of Vision and Development
- Càtedra UNESCO en Tècnica i Cultura – UNESCO Chair of Technology and Culture

== UPC Research Centers ==
The UPC has a number of research centres.

- BSC – Barcelona Supercomputing Center
- CCABA – Advanced Broadband Communications Center
- CD6 – Centre for Sensors, Instruments and Systems Development
- CDPAC – Cen. de Documentació de Projectes d'Arquitectura de Catalunya
- CEBIM – Molecular Biotechnology Centre
- CERpIE – C. Recerca i Desenv. per a la Millora i Innov.de les Empreses
- CETpD-UPC -Tech. Research Cen. for Dependency Care and Autonomous Living
- CPSV- Centre of Land Policy and Valuations
- CRAE – Centre de Recerca de l'Aeronàutica i de l'Espai
- CRAHI – Centre de Recerca Aplicada en Hidrometeorologia
- CRAL – Centre for Research and Services for the Local Administration
- CIMNE – International Center for Numerical Methods in Engineering
- CREB – Biomedical Engineering Research Centre
- CREMIT – Center for Engines and Heat Installations
- CRNE – Centre for Research in Nanoengineering
- LACÀN – Specific Research Center of Numerical Methods in Applied Sciences and Engineering
- LIM/UPC – Maritime Engineering Laboratory
- LITEM – Laboratori per a la Innovació Tecnològica d'Estructures i Materials
- MCIA – Center Innovation Electronics. Motion Control and Industrial Applications
- PERC-UPC – Power Electronics Research Centre
- TALP – Centre de Tecnologies i Aplicacions del Llenguatge i la Parla
- TIEG – Terrassa Industrial Electronics Group
- CIMNE – Centro Internacional de Métodos Numéricos en la Ingeniería

== Science Fiction Award ==
From 1991 to 2010, the board of trustees at the UPC organized and awarded an annual Science Fiction Award. Currently the award is presented bi-annually.

Previous winners include:

- 2007: Brandon Sanderson, Defending Elysium; and Carlos Gardini d'Angelo, Belcebú en llamas
- 2008: Eduardo Gallego Arjona and Guillem Sánchez Gómez, La cosecha del centauro
- 2009: Roberto Sanhueza, Bis
- 2010: José Miguel Sánchez Gómez (Yoss), Super extra grande
- 2012: Miguel Santander, La epopeya de los amantes
- 2014: Roberto Sanhueza, El año del gato

== See also ==
- Barcelona Supercomputing Center
- List of universities in Spain
- MareNostrum
- Vives Network
