= 2020–21 CE Sabadell FC season =

Sabadell
2020–21 season
- Owner: Investor Consortium
- President: Esteve Calzada
- Head coach: Antonio Hidalgo
- Stadium: Nova Creu Alta
- Segunda División: 19th (relegated)
- Copa del Rey: Second round
Home colours	Away colours

The 2020–21 season was Centre d'Esports Sabadell Futbol Club's 118th season in existence and the club's first season back in the second division of Spanish football. In addition to the domestic league, Sabadell participated in this season's edition of the Copa del Rey. The season covered the period from 26 July 2020 to 30 June 2021.

== Players ==
=== First-team squad ===
As of 12 January 2021

Note: Flags indicate national team as defined under FIFA eligibility rules; some limited exceptions apply. Players may hold more than one non-FIFA nationality.

No.	Pos.	Nation	Player
1	GK	ESP	Ian Mackay
2	FW	ESP	Stoichkov (on loan from Mallorca)
3	DF	ESP	Josu Ozkoidi
4	DF	ESP	Aleix Coch
5	DF	ESP	Jaime Sánchez
6	MF	ESP	Ángel Martínez (captain)
7	FW	ESP	Héber Pena
8	MF	ESP	Adri Cuevas
9	FW	ESP	Juan Hernández (on loan from Celta)
10	FW	ESP	Édgar Hernández
11	MF	ESP	Néstor Querol
12	DF	ESP	Óscar Rubio

No.	Pos.	Nation	Player
13	GK	ESP	Diego Fuoli
14	MF	ESP	Antonio Romero
15	DF	ESP	Juan Ibiza (on loan from Almería)
16	MF	ESP	Xavi Boniquet
17	MF	ESP	Víctor García (on loan from Valladolid)
18	MF	ESP	Pedro Capó
19	FW	ESP	Gorka Guruzeta
20	DF	ESP	Grego Sierra
21	MF	ESP	Aarón Rey
22	DF	FRA	Pierre Cornud
23	MF	ESP	Iker Undabarrena
24	FW	ESP	Álvaro Vázquez (on loan from Sporting Gijón)

== Transfers ==
=== In ===
No.	Pos	Player	Transferred from	Fee	Date	Source
15			TBD		1 July 2020	

=== Out ===
No.	Pos	Player	Transferred to	Fee	Date	Source
15			TBD		1 July 2020	

== Pre-season and friendlies ==
Win Draw Loss

4 September 2020 Friendly	Huesca	3–0	Sabadell	Villacañas, Spain
18:00 CEST (UTC+2)				Stadium: Campo De Fútbol Las Pirámides

9 September 2020 Friendly	Sabadell	1–0	Badalona	Sabadell, Spain
10:00 CEST (UTC+2)				Stadium: Estadi Municipal Josep Molins

== Competitions ==
=== Overview ===
Competition	First match	Last match	Starting round	Final position	Record							
Competition	First match	Last match	Starting round	Final position	Pld	W	D	L	GF	GA	GD	Win %
Segunda División	13 September 2020	30 May 2021	Matchday 1	19th	42	11	13	18	40	48	−8	26.19
Copa del Rey	16 December 2020	7 January 2021	First round	Second round	2	1	1	0	2	0	+2	50.00
Total					44	12	14	18	42	48	−6	27.27

Last updated: 30 May 2021
Source: Soccerway

=== Segunda División ===
==== League table ====
Pos	Team	Pld	W	D	L	GF	GA	GD	Pts	Promotion, qualification or relegation
17	Alcorcón	42	13	9	20	32	42	−10	48	
18	Lugo	42	11	14	17	38	53	−15	47	
19	Sabadell (R)	42	11	13	18	40	48	−8	46	Relegation to Primera División RFEF
20	UD Logroñés (R)	42	11	11	20	28	53	−25	44	Relegation to Primera División RFEF
21	Castellón (R)	42	11	8	23	35	54	−19	41	Relegation to Primera División RFEF

Source: LaLiga
Rules for classification: 1) points; 2) head-to-head points; 3) head-to-head goal difference; 4) goal difference; 5) number of goals scored
(R) Relegated

==== Results summary ====
Overall								Home						Away					
Pld	W	D	L	GF	GA	GD	Pts	W	D	L	GF	GA	GD	W	D	L	GF	GA	GD
42	11	13	18	40	48	−8	46	5	9	7	20	21	−1	6	4	11	20	27	−7

Last updated: 30 May 2021.
Source: La Liga

==== Results by round ====
Round	1	2	3	4	5	6	7	8	9	10	11	12	13	14	15	16	17	18	19	20	21	22	23	24	25	26	27	28	29	30	31	32	33	34	35	36	37	38	39	40	41	42
Ground	H	A	A	H	H	A	H	A	H	A	H	A	H	A	H	A	H	A	H	A	H	A	H	A	H	A	H	A	A	H	A	H	A	H	A	H	H	A	H	A	H	A
Result	L	L	L	L	L	L	D	D	W	W	L	L	W	L	L	W	L	W	D	D	D	D	D	W	D	L	D	L	L	D	W	D	L	D	D	W	W	L	L	L	W	W
Position	14	20	20	21	22	22	22	22	22	21	21	21	20	20	20	20	20	18	20	18	18	18	19	18	18	18	19	20	21	22	18	19	20	21	21	20	19	20	20	21	20	19

Updated to match(es) played on 30 May 2021. Source: La Liga
A = Away; H = Home; W = Win; D = Draw; L = Loss

==== Matches ====
The league fixtures were announced on 31 August 2020.

19 September 2020 2	Rayo Vallecano	2–1	Sabadell	Madrid
21:00 CEST (UTC+2)		Report		Stadium: Vallecas; Attendance: 0 (Note: The match was played behind closed doors due to the COVID-19 pandemic in Spain.); Referee: Daniel Jesús Trujillo Suárez

27 September 2020 3	Mallorca	1–0	Sabadell	Palma
16:00 CEST (UTC+2)	Abdón (yellow card) 68'; Rodríguez 85'	Report	Cornud (yellow card) 74' (yellow-red card) 76'; Mackay (yellow card) 78'; V. García (yellow card) 90+3'	Stadium: Visit Mallorca Stadium; Attendance: 0 Referee: Álvaro Moreno Aragón

4 October 2020 4	Sabadell	0–1	Espanyol	Sabadell
16:00 CEST (UTC+2)	Querol (yellow card) 71'	Report	Melamed 84'; Darder (yellow card) 87'; Da. López (yellow card) 90+4'	Stadium: Nova Creu Alta; Attendance: 0 Referee: Miguel Ángel Ortiz Arias

10 October 2020 5	Sabadell	0–2	Mirandés	Sabadell
13:00 CEST (UTC+2)	Cornud (yellow card) 80'; Rey (yellow card) 90+1'	Report	Martínez 75'; Gómez 78'	Stadium: Estadi de la Nova Creu Alta; Attendance: 0 Referee: Iosu Galech Apezteguia

17 October 2020 6	Albacete	3–0	Sabadell	Albacete
16:00 CEST (UTC+2)	Arroyo 34'; Israfilov (yellow card) 51'; Peña 52'; Zozulya 62' (pen.)	Report	Coch (yellow card) 61'	Stadium: Carlos Belmonte; Attendance: 0 Referee: Saúl Ais Reig

25 October 2020 8	Zaragoza	0–0	Sabadell	Zaragoza
21:00 CET (UTC+1)		Report		Stadium: La Romareda; Attendance: 0 Referee: Javier Iglesias Villanueva

29 October 2020 9	Sabadell	1–0	Leganés	Sabadell
21:30 CET (UTC+1)	Ibiza (yellow card) 27'; Ozkoidi (yellow card) 33'; Stoichkov 52'; Gergo (yellow card) 87'	Report	Hernández (yellow card) 23'; Tarín (yellow card) 38'; Santos (yellow card) 79'; Omeruo (yellow card) 82'; Pérez (yellow card) 90+9'	Stadium: Nova Creu Alta; Attendance: 0 Referee: Daniel Jesús Trujillo Suárez

1 November 2020 10	Ponferradina	0–3	Sabadell	Ponferrada
18:15 CET (UTC+1)		Report		Stadium: El Toralín; Attendance: 0 Referee: Rafael Sánchez López

5 November 2020 1	Sabadell	1–2	Almería	Sabadell
19:00 CET (UTC+1)	Édgar Hernández (yellow card) 17'; Undabarrena (yellow card) 34'; Stoichkov 39'; Grego (yellow card) 53'; Coch (yellow card) 60'; Pena (yellow card) 85'	Report	Aketxe 13' (pen.); Centelles (yellow card) 22'; Peybernes (yellow card) 39' (yellow-red card) 41'; De la Hoz (yellow card) 57'; Balliu (yellow card) 65'; Ramazani (yellow card) 70' (goal) 90+3'; Buñuel (yellow card) 73'	Stadium: Nova Creu Alta; Attendance: 0 Referee: Iosu Galech Apezteguía

8 November 2020 11	Sabadell	1–2	Málaga	Sabadell
14:00 CET (UTC+1)	Querol 18'	Report	Calero 16'; Chavarría 75'	Stadium: Estadi de la Nova Creu Alta; Attendance: 0 Referee: Juan Luis Pulido Santana

15 November 2020 12	UD Logroñés	1–0	Sabadell	Logroño
18:30 CET (UTC+1)	Acevedo 83'	Report		Stadium: Las Gaunas; Attendance: 0 Referee: Miguel Ángel Ortiz Arias

22 November 2020 13	Sabadell	3–1	Las Palmas	Sabadell
14:00 CET (UTC+1)	Cuevas 33', 69', (yellow card) 60'; Guruzeta 45'	Report	Jonathan (red card) 57'; Ruiz 63'; Cabrera (yellow card) 90+2'	Stadium: Estadi de la Nova Creu Alta; Attendance: 0 Referee: Álvaro Moreno Aragón

25 November 2020 14	Sporting Gijón	3–1	Sabadell	Gijón
19:00 CET (UTC+1)	García 8'; Campos 73', 84'	Report	Romero (yellow card) 30'; Sánchez (yellow card) 33'; Undabarrena (yellow card) 63'; Hernández 70'; Grego (red card) 88'	Stadium: El Molinón; Attendance: 0 Referee: Francisco José Hernández Maeso

28 November 2020 15	Sabadell	1–2	Fuenlabrada	Sabadell
16:00 CET (UTC+1)		Report		Stadium: Nova Creu Alta; Attendance: 0 Referee: Luis Mario Milla Alvendiz

3 December 2020 16	Tenerife	1–2	Sabadell	Santa Cruz de Tenerife
19:00 CET (UTC+1)	Muñoz 34'	Report	Stoichkov 1'; Coch 19'	Stadium: Heliodoro Rodríguez López; Attendance: 0 Referee: Óliver de la Fuente Ramos

6 December 2020 17	Sabadell	0–1	Oviedo	Sabadell
20:30 CET (UTC+1)		Report	Sangalli 65'	Stadium: Estadi de la Nova Creu Alta; Attendance: 0 Referee: Aitor Gorostegui Fernández-Ortega

9 December 2020 7	Sabadell	1–1	Alcorcón	Sabadell
19:00 CEST (UTC+2)	Ibiza 90+3'	Report	Fraile 76' (pen.)	Stadium: Estadi de la Nova Creu Alta; Attendance: 0 Referee: Gorka Sagués Oscoz

13 December 2020 18	Cartagena	1–2	Sabadell	Cartagena
18:30 CET (UTC+1)	Castro 62'	Report	Guruzeta 78'; Carlos David 83' (o.g.)	Stadium: Estadio Cartagonova; Attendance: 0 Referee: Iosu Galech Apezteguía

19 December 2020 19	Sabadell	1–1	Castellón	Sabadell
16:00 CET (UTC+1)	Jaime Sánchez (yellow card) 25'; Ibiza (yellow card) 54'; Martínez (yellow card) 90'; Querol 90+3'	Report	Satrústegui 45+1'; Señé (yellow card) 87'; Jordi Sánchez (yellow card) 90+5'	Stadium: Estadi de la Nova Creu Alta; Attendance: 0 Referee: Luis Mario Milla Alvéndiz

4 January 2021 20	Girona	0–0	Sabadell	Girona
18:30 CET (UTC+1)		Report		Stadium: Montilivi; Attendance: 0 Referee: Gorka Sagués Oscoz

11 January 2021 21	Sabadell	1–1	Lugo	Sabadell
20:30 CET (UTC+1)	Guruzeta 36'	Report	Barreiro 90+4' (pen.)	Stadium: Estadi de la Nova Creu Alta; Attendance: 0 Referee: Iñaki Vicandi Garrido

24 January 2021 22	Almería	2–2	Sabadell	Almería
14:00 CET (UTC+1)	Fernandes (yellow card) 23'; Costa 38', (yellow card) 90+4'; Sadiq 76'	Report	Cornud (yellow card) 36'; Rubio 66'; Juan Hernández 84'	Stadium: Estadio de los Juegos Mediterráneos; Attendance: 0 Referee: Daniel Ocón Arráiz

1 February 2021 23	Sabadell	0–0	UD Logroñés	Sabadell
21:00 CET (UTC+1)		Report		Stadium: Nova Creu Alta; Attendance: 0 Referee: Miguel Ángel Ortiz Arias

7 February 2021 24	Las Palmas	0–1	Sabadell	Las Palmas
20:30 CET (UTC+2)	Domínguez (red card) 33'	Report	Hernández 62'	Stadium: Estadio Gran Canaria; Attendance: 0 Referee: Javier Iglesias Villanueva

12 February 2021 25	Sabadell	1–1	Zaragoza	Sabadell
21:00 CET (UTC+1)	Grego (yellow card) 57'; Stoichkov 71' (pen.)	Report	Bermejo (yellow card) 27'; Jair 32'; Narváez (penalty missed) 74'	Stadium: Estadi de la Nova Creu Alta; Attendance: 0 Referee: David Gálvez Rascón

20 February 2021 26	Espanyol	1–0	Sabadell	Cornellà de Llobregat
16:00 CET (UTC+1)	De Tomás 52', (yellow card) 82'; Vadillo (yellow card) 76'; Pedrosa (yellow card) 85'; Mérida (yellow card) 90+4'	Report		Stadium: RCDE Stadium; Attendance: 0 Referee: Daniel Ocón Arráiz

26 February 2021 27	Sabadell	0–0	Albacete	Sabadell
19:00 CET (UTC+1)	Cornud (yellow card) 47'; García (yellow card) 52'	Report	Benito (yellow card) 86'; Arroyo (red card) 90'	Stadium: Estadi de la Nova Creu Alta; Attendance: 0 Referee: Saúl Ais Reig

7 March 2021 28	Málaga	2–0	Sabadell	Málaga
14:00 CET (UTC+1)	Muñoz 62', 90+5' (pen.)	Report		Stadium: La Rosaleda; Attendance: 0 Referee: Miguel Ángel Ortiz Arias

13 March 2021 29	Castellón	2–1	Sabadell	Castellón de la Plana
18:30 CET (UTC+1)	Cornud 3' (o.g.); Señé 79'	Report	Pena 66' (pen.)	Stadium: Nou Estadi Castàlia; Attendance: 0 Referee: José Antonio López Toca

20 March 2021 30	Sabadell	1–1	Sporting Gijón	Sabadell
16:00 CET (UTC+1)	Stoichkov 23' (pen.)	Report	Đurđević 54'	Stadium: Estadi de la Nova Creu Alta; Attendance: 0 Referee: Javier Iglesias Villanueva

28 March 2021 31	Lugo	0–1	Sabadell	Lugo
14:00 CEST (UTC+2)		Report	Ibiza 12'	Stadium: Anxo Carro; Attendance: 0 Referee: Óliver de la Fuente Ramos

31 March 2021 32	Sabadell	2–2	Girona	Sabadell
19:00 CEST (UTC+2)	Stoichkov 8', 45+2'	Report	Gumbau 44'; Sáiz 55' (pen.)	Stadium: Estadi de la Nova Creu Alta; Attendance: 0 Referee: Francisco José Hernández Maeso

4 April 2021 33	Leganés	2–1	Sabadell	Leganés
18:15 CEST (UTC+2)	Arnaiz 7'; Ibáñez 29'	Report	Rubio 59'	Stadium: Estadio Municipal de Butarque; Attendance: 0 Referee: Rafael Sánchez López

11 April 2021 34	Sabadell	1–1	Cartagena	Sabadell
16:15 CEST (UTC+2)	Stoichkov 21'	Report	Castro 53'	Stadium: Nova Creu Alta; Attendance: 0 Referee: Álvaro Moreno Aragón

16 April 2021 35	Fuenlabrada	2–2	Sabadell	Fuenlabrada
19:00 CEST (UTC+2)	Garcés 49'; Nteka 67'	Report	Ozkoidi 17'; Cristóbal 70' (o.g.)	Stadium: Fernando Torres; Attendance: 0 Referee: Jon Ander González Esteban

26 April 2021 36	Sabadell	1–0	Mallorca	Sabadell
21:00 CEST (UTC+2)	Sánchez 13'	Report	Valjent (yellow card) 35'; Sastre (yellow card) 39'; Rodríguez (yellow card) 88'	Stadium: Estadi de la Nova Creu Alta; Attendance: 0 Referee: Iosu Galech Apezteguía

3 May 2021 37	Sabadell	2–0	Rayo Vallecano	Sabadell
18:00 CEST (UTC+2)	Stoichkov (yellow card) 37'; Grego (yellow card) 43'; Cuevas 53', (yellow card) 90'; Ozkoidi (red card) 58'; Mackay (yellow card) 70'; Hernández 90+5'	Report	Catena (yellow card) 83'; Trejo (yellow card) 89'	Stadium: Estadi de la Nova Creu Alta; Attendance: 0 Referee: Óliver de la Fuente Ramos

9 May 2021 38	Oviedo	2–1	Sabadell	Oviedo
16:00 CEST (UTC+2)	Rodri 16'; Nahuel 39'	Report	Rubio 38'	Stadium: Carlos Tartiere; Attendance: 0 Referee: Daniel Ocón Arráiz

16 May 2021 39	Sabadell	0–2	Tenerife	Sabadell
14:00 CEST (UTC+2)		Report	Vada 22'; González 51'	Stadium: Estadi de la Nova Creu Alta; Attendance: 0 Referee: José Antonio López Toca

19 May 2021 40	Alcorcón	2–0	Sabadell	Alcorcón
19:00 CEST (UTC+2)		Report		Stadium: Santo Domingo; Attendance: 0 Referee: Eduardo Prieto Iglesias

24 May 2021 41	Sabadell	2–0	Ponferradina	Sabadell
21:00 CEST (UTC+2)	Cuevas 10'; Undabarrena (yellow card) 23'; Stoichkov 34'; Ibiza (yellow card) 73'	Report	Amo (yellow card) 70'	Stadium: Estadi de la Nova Creu Alta; Attendance: 0 Referee: Alejandro Muñiz Ruiz

30 May 2021 42	Mirandés	0–2	Sabadell	Miranda de Ebro
21:00 CEST (UTC+2)	Trigueros (yellow card) 70'	Report	Hernández 65'; Stoichkov 79'	Stadium: Estadio Municipal de Anduva; Attendance: 0 Referee: Javier Iglesias Villanueva

=== Copa del Rey ===
16 December 2020 First round	CD Ibiza Islas Pitiusas	0–2	Sabadell	Ibiza
19:00 CET (UTC+1)		Report	Querol 79'; Stoichkov 90'	Stadium: Can Misses; Referee: Saúl Ais Reig

7 January 2021 Second round	Peña Deportiva	0–0 (a.e.t.) (2–0 p)	Sabadell	Santa Eulària des Riu
19:00 CET (UTC+1)		Report		Stadium: Municipal; Referee: Aitor Gorostegui Fernández-Ortega
	Penalties
	Cruz (penalty scored); De Val (penalty scored); Gilbert (penalty missed); Cristeto (penalty missed)		(penalty missed) Guruzeta; (penalty missed) Boniquet; (penalty missed) Querol; (penalty missed) Martínez
