= EPSC =

EPSC can stand for:

- Escola Politècnica Superior de Castelldefels
- European Political Strategy Centre
- Excitatory postsynaptic current
- ICAO code of Szczecin-Goleniów "Solidarność" Airport in Poland
- Early peak systolic compliance
- European Poker Sport Championship
- Erosion Prevention & Sediment Control
