= Institute of Geomatics =

Spanish research consortium

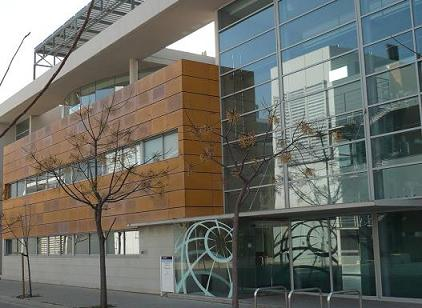
- Institute of Geomatics headquarters at Castelldefels.
- Other name: IG
- Established: 1997
- Director: Ismael Colomina i Fosch
- Location: Avinguda de Carl Friedrich Gauss 11, Castelldefels, Barcelona; 41°16′29.2″N 1°59′12.1″E
- Campus: Mediterranean Technology Park
- Website: www.ideg.cat

The Institute of Geomatics (IG) was a public consortium made up of the Autonomous Government of Catalonia (Ministry of Territory and Sustainability, and the Ministry of Economy and Knowledge) and the Polytechnic University of Catalonia, created by Decree Law 256/1997 of the Autonomous Government of Catalonia, on September 30, 1997. It was a founding member of the Associació Catalana d'Entitats de Recerca (ACER).

The Institute of Geomatics was dissolved on December, 31st 2013, following the Government Agreement of Dissolution signed on December, 23rd 2013. The institute, including personnel, equipment and developments, was integrated as the Geomatics division of the Centre Tecnològic de Telecomunicacions de Catalunya.

== Activities ==
The institute's mission was the "promotion and development of Geomatics, through applied research and teaching, for the benefit of society".

Within the framework defined by its mission, the institute mainly conducted the following activities:

- Basic research activities
- Applied research activities
- Technology and knowledge transfer activities and projects
- Teaching, specialized training, course and conference activities
- Organization of congresses and other scientific dissemination activities,

== Vision on Research ==
The Institute of Geomatics was a public non-profit research center. Since 1999 it worked intensively on research, knowledge transfer and dissemination of geomatic science and technology.

Geomatics is a variety of techniques that integrate sensors capturing data and images (mainly cameras, but also from other remote sensors) with methods for the treatment, analysis, interpretation, diffusion and storage of geographic information.

Geomatics connects various traditional disciplines, such as geodesy, cartography, remote sensing, satellite navigation and information and communication technologies. Geomatics allows us today to obtain information about the Earth and its atmosphere globally and within very short time.

The Institute centered its activities around two main areas: the area of positioning and navigation, focused on techniques to improve precision, and the area of remote sensing, which means Earth observation through images and data collected by sensors on-board of satellites, aircraft and ground platforms.

More specifically, the IG research lines entailed:

- Remote Sensing and Photogrammetry, including ground, airborne and/or satellite observation systems, sensor and acquisition systems' technology, geometric and radiometric data normalization, and information extraction and fusion from data
- Geodesy, including spatial and inertial geodesy, high precision static and kinematic positioning, and gravity field determination
- Cartographic modelling and representation, including technology and application of Geographic Information Systems for spatial data integration and exploitation
- Navigation, including Global Navigation Satellite Systems, Inertial Measurement Units, and multi-sensor integration for applications in transportation, agriculture, search-and-rescue and airborne remote sensing

The IG participated in a wide portfolio of research projects, covering areas such as cartography, topography, search-and-rescue, civil engineering, agriculture, mobile mapping, location-based services, unmanned aerial vehicles, and many others.
