= Castelldefels School of Telecommunications and Aerospace Engineering =

Education establishment in Catalonia, Spain

- Escola d'Enginyeria de Telecomunicació i Aeroespacial de Castelldefels
- Other name: EETAC
- Type: Public
- Established: 1991
- Academic affiliations: Technical University of Catalonia
- Director: Cristina Cervelló i Pastor
- Administrative staff: 170
- Students: 1,355
- Location: Castelldefels, Barcelona
- Campus: Baix Llobregat Campus
- Website: www.eetac.upc.edu

The Castelldefels School of Telecommunications and Aerospace Engineering (Catalan: Escola d'Enginyeria de Telecomunicació i Aeroespacial de Castelldefels, EETAC; Spanish: Escuela de Ingeniería de Telecomunicaciones y Aeroespacial de Casteldefels) is a higher educational establishment on Baix Llobregat Campus in Castelldefels, Catalonia, Spain. It is part of the Technical University of Catalonia (UPC) and offers courses in aeronautics and telecommunications.

== Degrees ==
=== Bachelor degrees (4 years, 240 ECTS) ===
- Bachelor's degree in Air Navigation Engineering
- Bachelor's degree in Airports Engineering
- Bachelor's degree in Telecommunication Systems
- Bachelor's degree in Network Engineering
- Bachelor's degree in Satellite Engineering

=== Master degrees ===
- MASTEAM: Master of Science in Telecommunication Engineering & Management (taught in English)(120 ECTS)
- MAST: Master in Aerospace Science and Technology (taught in English)(90 ECTS)
- GEONAV: Master's degree in Geomatics and Navigation (taught in English)(90 ECTS)
- Master's degree in Airports and Air Navigation (taught in English)(60 ECTS)
- Master's degree in Applications and Technologies for Unmanned Aircraft Systems (Drones)-(taught in English)(60 ECTS)

=== PhD ===
- MASTEAM offers a specific itinerary oriented to research and PhD degree programs
- DOCTA: PhD program in Aerospace Science and Technology

== Quality in teaching ==
Since its creation in 1991, the School has been committed to high quality management and teaching. The EETAC was awarded the Certificate of Quality ISO 9001:2000 which was renewed in 2005. The Catalan Agència per la Qualitat del Sistema Universitari (AQU) granted two distinction awards to the EETAC. In addition the school was awarded the Prize Vicens Vives twice (1996 and 2004) and the Flyer Prize in 2006.

== Project-based learning ==
In 2001 the School opened its master's degree in Telecommunication Engineering, with a curriculum fully based on a project-based learning strategy, with a structure similar to that used by Aalborg University (Denmark). This consists of a two-year, 3000 hour program (1500 hours per year), of which 1800 are devoted to project development. Typically, one semester is formed by two blocks or learning units, each block formed by a multidisciplinary project and one or two courses closely connected with the project. The project is developed by students working in teams of 4-6 students.

== Research at the EETAC ==
Some departments of the university have groups of investigation that develop their activities in the EETAC, fundamentally in the following subjects:

- Astronomy and Astrophyshics
- Broadband Networks and Services
- Control, Monitoring and Communications
- Distributed Systems Architectures
- Instrumentation, Sensors and Interfaces
- Intelligent Communications and Avionics
- Microgravity and Modelization
- Microwaves
- Mobile and Radio Communications
- Optical Communications
- Photonics
- Satellite Systems
- Security and Networking
- Wireless Networks

== EETAC and the Baix Llobregat Campus ==
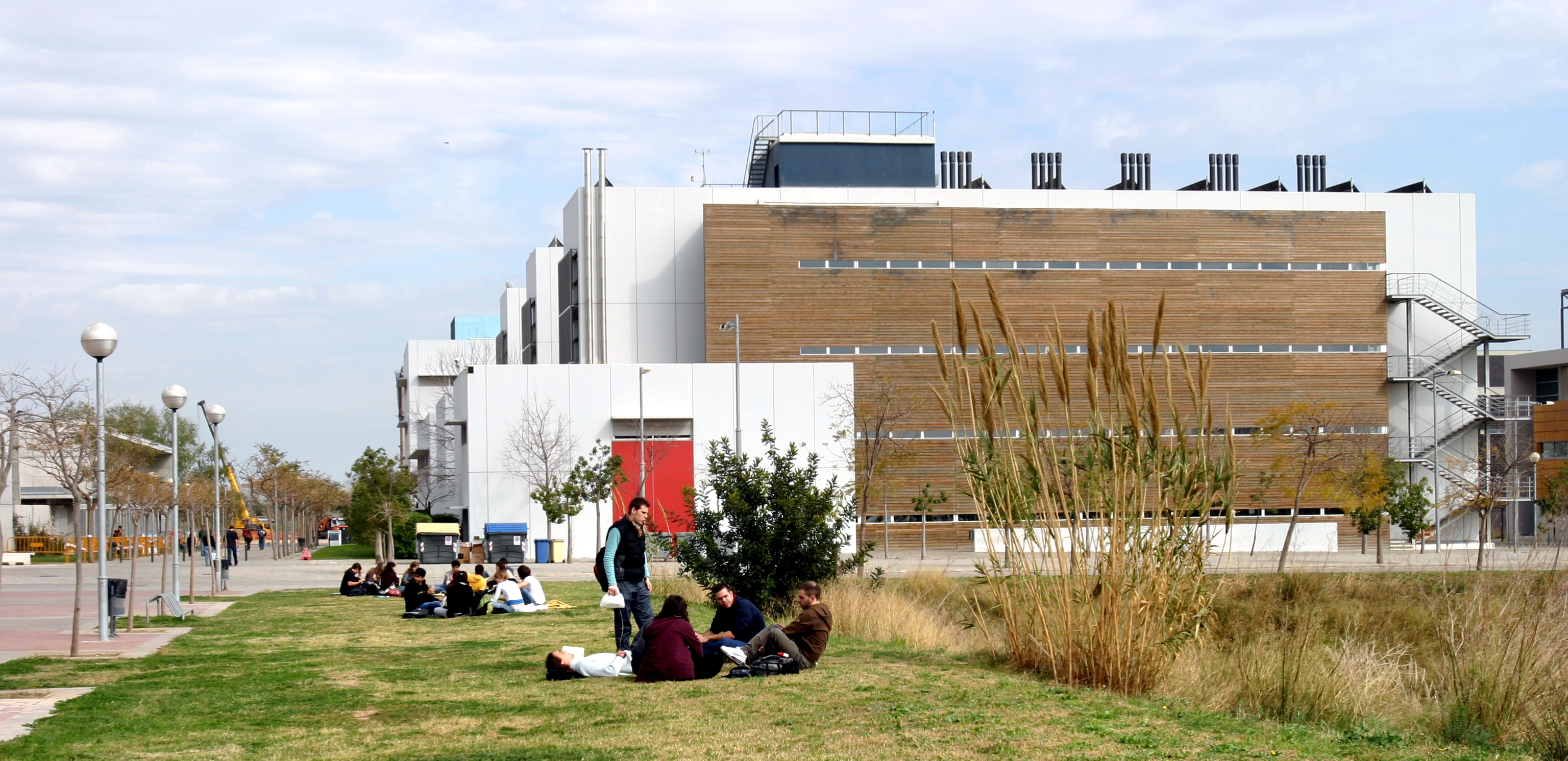
EETAC

The EETAC is part of the Baix Llobregat Campus, a Campus of the Technical University of Catalonia which is located alongside the Mediterranean Technology Park (PMT).

The PMT is a science and technology park that was set up by the Autonomous Government of Catalonia, the Regional Council of Baix Llobregat, the Castelldefels City Council and the Technical University of Catalonia. The PMT aims to create links between educational institutions, research centres, high tech companies and technology-based spin-off companies.

Centers of public investigation in the PMT:

- Centre Tecnològic i de les Telecomunicacions de Catalunya (CTTC)
- ICFO-The Institute of Photonic Sciences
- Institut de Geomàtica (IdeG)
- International Center for Numerical Methods in Engineering (CIMNE)
- Internet Interdisciplinary Institute (IN3)
- i2CAT Foundation

Companies in the PMT:

- Nortel
- Tempos 21
- Ingenia
- Futur Echo
