= Édgar Hernández (footballer, born 1987) =

Spanish footballer

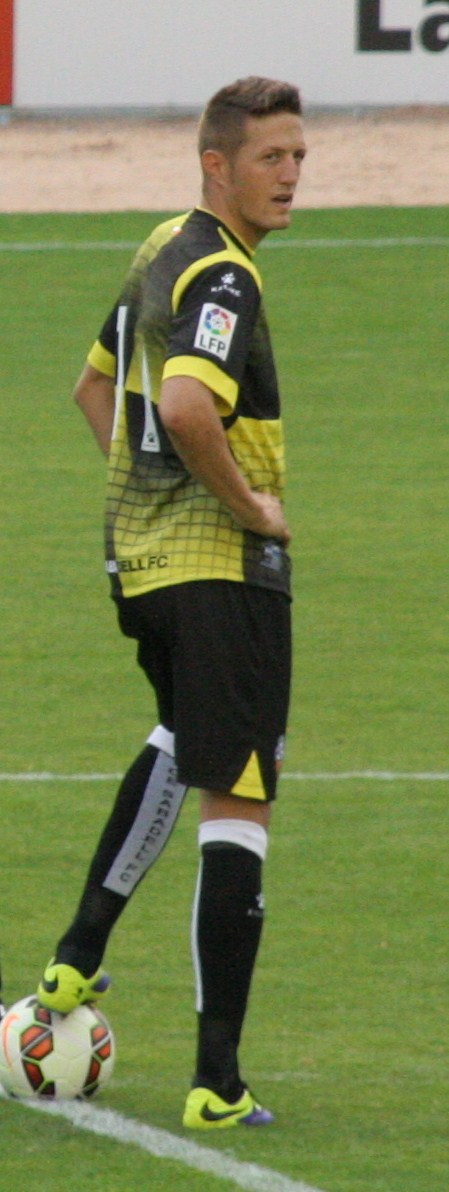

Personal information
- Full name: Édgar Hernández Marcé
- Date of birth: 2 February 1987 (age 39)
- Place of birth: Gavà, Spain
- Height: 1.87 m (6 ft 2 in)
- Position: Forward

Youth career
- 1997–2001: Gavà
- 2001–2006: Cornellà

Senior career*
Years	Team	Apps	(Gls)
2006–2007	Cornellà	45	(11)
2007–2008	Ciutadella	34	(18)
2008–2009	Zaragoza B	36	(11)
2009–2010	Alicante	32	(6)
2010–2011	Celta B	26	(3)
2011–2012	Gavà	22	(10)
2012–2013	Sant Andreu	50	(20)
2013–2014	Sabadell	22	(1)
2014–2018	Reus	111	(20)
2018–2021	Sabadell	85	(13)
2021–2022	Gimnàstic	24	(3)
2022–2024	Badalona Futur	34	(5)
- * Club domestic league appearances and goals as of 19 May 2024

Édgar Hernández Marcé (born 2 February 1987) is a Spanish footballer who plays as a forward.

== Club career ==
Born in Gavà, Barcelona, Catalonia, Hernández finished his youth career with local UE Cornellà, making his senior debut in the 2005–06 season in Tercera División. He first arrived in Segunda División B in the summer of 2009, signing with Alicante CF.

Hernández joined RC Celta de Vigo in June 2010, being assigned to the B team also in the third division. The following campaign he dropped down a tier by signing with CF Gavà, but returned to division three shortly after with UE Sant Andreu.

After scoring a career-best 17 goals in his first full season, in 34 appearances, Hernández joined CE Sabadell FC from Segunda División in June 2013. He made his debut as a professional on 25 August, playing the last 27 minutes in a 0–2 away defeat against SD Ponferradina.

On 29 August 2014, Hernández moved to third-tier club CF Reus Deportiu. He netted a team-best 12 times in 2015–16, helping to a first-ever promotion to the professional leagues.

Hernández returned to the third division in the 2018 off-season, with the 31-year-old agreeing to a two-year contract at former team Sabadell. He scored nine times during the 2019–20 campaign, as the Arquelinats achieved promotion to the second division.

On 8 July 2021, Herández signed a one-year deal with Primera División RFEF side Gimnàstic de Tarragona.
