= Toni Moral =

Spanish footballer (born 1981)

Personal information
- Full name: Antonio del Moral Segura
- Date of birth: 29 August 1981 (age 45)
- Place of birth: Terrassa, Spain
- Height: 1.77 m (5 ft 9 1/2 in)
- Position: Winger

Youth career
- 1991–1993: Mercantil
- 1993–2000: Barcelona

Senior career*
Years	Team	Apps	(Gls)
2000–2002	Barcelona C	64	(10)
2002–2004	Real Madrid B	63	(6)
2004–2005	Celta B	28	(9)
2005	Celta	6	(1)
2005–2006	Tenerife	32	(5)
2006–2008	Alavés	92	(12)
2009–2010	Racing Santander	36	(2)
2010–2012	Cartagena	69	(9)
2012–2013	Girona	17	(3)
2013–2014	Platanias	9	(0)
2014	Al-Ittihad		
2014–2015	Hatta		
Total		416	(57)
- * Club domestic league appearances and goals

Antonio 'Toni' del Moral Segura (born 29 August 1981) is a Spanish former footballer who played as a winger.

He amassed Segunda División totals of 214 games and 30 goals during eight seasons, in representation of Celta, Tenerife, Alavés, Cartagena and Girona. In La Liga, he appeared for Racing de Santander.

== Football career ==
Born in Terrassa, Barcelona, Catalonia, Moral appeared with the reserves of both FC Barcelona and Real Madrid, joining RC Celta de Vigo of the second division in 2004–05 only to spend the majority of the season with its B-side. In two of his few appearances with the main squad, against Terrassa FC and Xerez CD, he played while registered with the second team, leading three promotion rivals to unsuccessfully request that the Royal Spanish Football Federation dock points from the Galicians.

From 2006 to 2008, after one year with CD Tenerife, Moral was an instrumental attacking figure for Deportivo Alavés (both teams also competed in the second level). He moved in January 2009 to Racing de Santander, as another forward, Juanjo, was loaned in the opposite direction. He made his La Liga debut as a second-half substitute in a 1–0 away win against Real Valladolid, on the 4th.

In late August 2010, after two seasons being used sparingly, Moral terminated his contract with Racing and signed for FC Cartagena in division two. On 11 September, he scored twice for his new club in a 5–1 home win over FC Barcelona B; he contributed with three goals from 32 games in his second year, with the Murcians being relegated after a three-year stay.

Free agent Moral joined another side in the second tier, Girona FC, for the 2012–13 campaign. Subsequently, at the age of 32, he moved abroad for the first time in his career, signing with Platanias in the Super League Greece.
