= Lycée Français de Gavà Bon Soleil =

Lycée International Barcelona - Bon Soleil

Location
- Camino de la Pava 15 / Camí de la Pava 15, 08850 Barcelone (Gavà)
- Coordinates: 41.27275°N 1.9997200000000248°E

Information
- Established: 1969
- School district: Gavà
- Website: www.bonsoleil.es

Lycée International Barcelona - Bon Soleil (LIB) is a French international school in Gavà, Barcelona Province, Catalonia, Spain. As of 2016 it serves petite section through seconde, the second-to-last year of lycée (sixth form college/high school). The school serves ages 3–18.

== History ==
Claire and Sebastian Cabré founded the École Bon Soleil in 1969, initially having 12 students. By 1997 the student population grew to 725. That year the school was renamed to the Collège Bon Soleil, and in 2010 the school received its current name.

== Student body ==
As of 2016 the school has 1,220 students from 17 nationalities. 72% of the students were Spanish nationals, and 24% were French nationals. Other students had citizenships of Argentina, Belgium, Canada, Italy, the Netherlands, Russia, the United Kingdom, and the United States.
