= James Caton =

English footballer (born 1994)

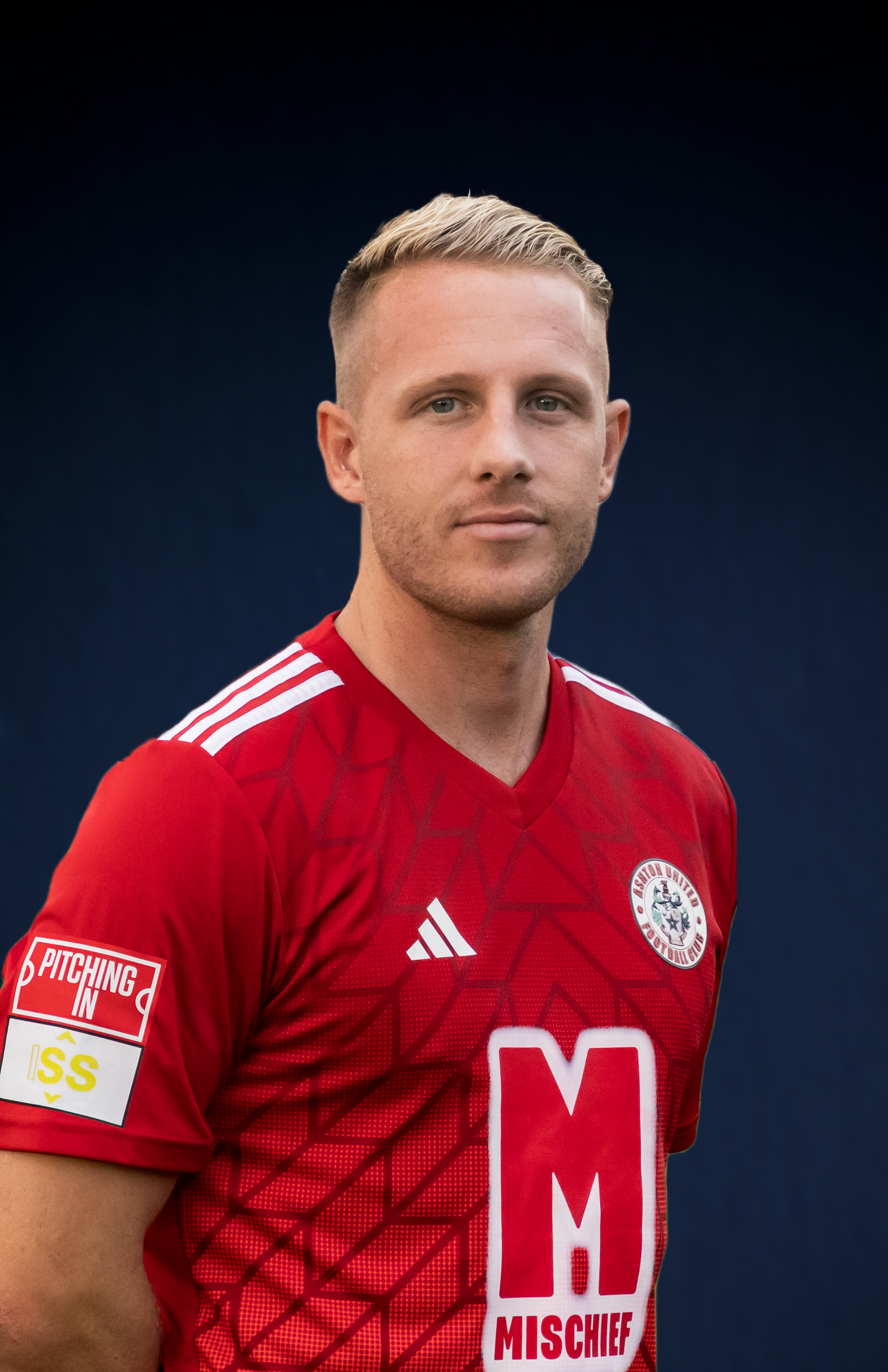
- Caton playing for Ashton United

Personal information
- Full name: James Alan Kenneth Caton
- Date of birth: 4 January 1994 (age 32)
- Place of birth: Widnes, England
- Height: 5 ft 8 in (1.73 m)
- Position: Winger

Team information
- Current team: Ashton United

Youth career
- 2003–2012: Bolton Wanderers

Senior career*
Years	Team	Apps	(Gls)
2012–2014	Blackpool	2	(0)
2013	→ Accrington Stanley (loan)	2	(0)
2014	→ Chester (loan)	1	(1)
2014–2016	Shrewsbury Town	2	(0)
2015	→ Southport (loan)	4	(0)
2015	→ Mansfield Town (loan)	0	(0)
2015–2016	→ Wrexham (loan)	4	(0)
2016	→ Lincoln City (loan)	12	(3)
2016–2017	Southport	23	(2)
2017	Dover Athletic	0	(0)
2017–2019	Darlington	25	(1)
2018	→ Warrington Town (loan)	5	(1)
2018–2019	→ Stalybridge Celtic (loan)	4	(0)
2019	Nuneaton Borough	7	(1)
2021–2022	Dover Athletic	12	(0)
2022	Hereford	8	(1)
2022–2023	Nantwich Town	11	(3)
2023	Bamber Bridge	2	(0)
2023–2024	Ashton United	15	(0)
- * Club domestic league appearances and goals as of 30 June 2024

James Alan Kenneth Caton (born 4 January 1994) is an English footballer who plays as an attacking midfielder.

He has played in the Football League for Blackpool, Accrington Stanley and Shrewsbury Town.

== Early life and career ==
Caton was born in Widnes, where he attended Wade Deacon High School. As well as football, he played rugby league at school, and was a member of his Year 10 team that reached the Champion Schools final at Twickenham in 2009. Caton played football for boys' team Widnes Wolves before joining Bolton Wanderers as a nine-year-old schoolboy. He was a part of the England U16s setup that won the Victory shield and turned professional with Bolton in 2010, but was released in the summer of 2012. After a trial with Derby County, Caton scored against Everton in Keith Southern's testimonial match as part of a successful trial with Blackpool.

== Club career ==
=== Blackpool ===
Caton signed a two-year contract with Football League Championship club Blackpool, with the option of a third year, in August 2012. He said his move to Blackpool was motivated by the club's playing style. Named twice on the bench in his first year, against Cardiff City and Watford, his senior debut came on 31 August 2013, as a late substitute for Nathan Delfouneso in a 1–0 win against Watford.

He joined League Two club Accrington Stanley on a month's loan in October 2013, and made his debut in a 2–1 loss against Dagenham & Redbridge, coming on as a substitute for Nicky Hunt in the 59th minute. However, his loan was cut short due to injury. In March 2014, he went on loan again, to Conference Premier club Chester until the end of the season. He scored on his debut, having come on as a half-time substitute against Grimsby Town, but made no more appearances for the club.

At the end of the 2013–14 season, Caton was released.

=== Shrewsbury Town ===
Following his release by Blackpool, Caton joined Shrewsbury Town on a free transfer in June 2014. He made his league debut as a 57th-minute substitute for Ashley Vincent in a 2–1 win over Tranmere Rovers on 16 August 2014.

Having only been on the fringes of the first-team squad, he went on loan to Southport in January 2015. After returning to his parent club, he captained a young Shrewsbury side to victory over local rivals AFC Telford United in the Shropshire Senior Cup final, also scoring the opening goal in a 3–1 win.

Just prior to the start of the following season, Caton joined League Two club Mansfield Town on a one-month loan, during which he made a single appearance in the League Cup. In November 2015, he signed for Wrexham of the National League on loan until January. On his return to Shrewsbury, he made another loan move, to another National League club, Lincoln City, for the rest of the season.

Caton was released by Shrewsbury Town when his contract expired.

=== Non-league career ===
Caton joined up once again with Lincoln City in the following pre-season with a view to earning a permanent deal, but was unable to agree terms. He signed a six-month contract with National League club Southport in August 2016. His 23 league appearances produced two goals – a consolation in a 4–1 defeat to Barrow, and the winning goal at Torquay United, – and his contract was not renewed.

Caton joined National League rivals Dover Athletic on 2 February 2017 for what remained of the season. He played twice, in the quarter-final and semi-final of the Kent Senior Cup, and scored in each match, but made no league appearances.

Following his release from Dover, Caton signed a two-year contract with National League North club Darlington on 17 July 2017. In the 2018–19 season, he spent time on loan to Northern Premier League clubs Warrington Town and Stalybridge Celtic. He left Darlington by mutual consent in January 2019, and finished the season with Nuneaton Borough.

Alongside his football career, Caton studied for a BA degree in football coaching and management with UCFB, which he completed in 2021. He then rejoined Dover Athletic. Caton was released after one season following relegation.

On 3 September 2022, Caton joined National League North club Hereford; he was released three months later, subsequently joining Nantwich Town. He joined Northern Premier League promotion hopefuls Bamber Bridge in March 2023, and moved on to divisional rival Ashton United for the 2023–24 season.

== Career statistics ==
As of end of 2023–24 season

Appearances and goals by club, season and competition
Club	Season	League			FA Cup		League Cup		Other		Total	
Club	Season	Division	Apps	Goals	Apps	Goals	Apps	Goals	Apps	Goals	Apps	Goals
Blackpool	2012–13	Championship	0	0	0	0	0	0	—		0	0
Blackpool	2013–14	Championship	2	0	0	0	0	0	—		2	0
Blackpool	Total		2	0	0	0	0	0	—		2	0
Accrington Stanley (loan)	2013–14	League Two	2	0	0	0	—		—		2	0
Chester (loan)	2013–14	Conference Premier	1	1	—		—		—		1	1
Shrewsbury Town	2014–15	League Two	2	0	0	0	1	0	1	0	4	0
Shrewsbury Town	2015–16	League One	0	0	0	0	—		0	0	0	0
Shrewsbury Town	Total		2	0	0	0	1	0	1	0	4	1
Southport (loan)	2014–15	Conference Premier	4	0	—		—		—		4	0
Mansfield Town (loan)	2015–16	League Two	0	0	—		1	0	0	0	1	0
Wrexham (loan)	2015–16	National League	4	0	—		—		0	0	4	0
Lincoln City (loan)	2015–16	National League	12	3	—		—		0	0	12	3
Southport	2016–17	National League	23	2	2	0	—		1 (Note: Appearance(s) in FA Trophy)	1	26	3
Dover Athletic	2016–17	National League	0	0	—		—		2 (Note: Appearances in Kent Senior Cup)	2	2	2
Darlington	2017–18	National League North	25	1	1	0	—		1	0	27	1
Darlington	2018–19	National League North	0	0	0	0	—		—		0	0
Darlington	Total		25	1	1	0	—		1	0	27	1
Stalybridge Celtic (loan)	2018–19	Northern Premier League Premier Division	4	0	—		—		5	0	9	0
Nuneaton Borough	2018–19	National League North	7	0	—		—		—		7	0
Dover Athletic	2021–22	National League	12	0	0	0	—		1	0	13	0
Hereford	2022–23	National League North	8	1	4	1	—		1	0	13	2
Nantwich Town	2022–23	Northern Premier League Premier Division	11	3	—		—		1 (Note: Appearance in Cheshire Senior Cup)	0	12	3
Bamber Bridge	2022–23	Northern Premier League Premier Division	2	0	—		—		1 (Note: Appearance in Lancashire FA Challenge Trophy)	0	3	0
Ashton United	2023–24	Northern Premier League Premier Division	15	0	3	1	—		5 (Note: Two appearances in FA Trophy, three appearances and one goal in Manchester Premier Cup)	1	23	2
Career total			134	11	10	2	2	0	19	4	165	17
