= Ángel Martínez (footballer, born 1986) =

Spanish footballer

Ángel
Personal information
- Full name: Ángel Martínez Cervera
- Date of birth: 31 January 1986 (age 40)
- Place of birth: Girona, Spain
- Height: 1.76 m (5 ft 9 in)
- Position: Midfielder

Youth career
- 1995–1997: Gironès-Sàbat
- 1997–1999: Bons Aires
- 1999–2003: Vilobí
- 2003–2005: Espanyol

Senior career*
Years	Team	Apps	(Gls)
2005–2007	Espanyol B	55	(7)
2007–2011	Espanyol	50	(2)
2009–2010	→ Rayo Vallecano (loan)	27	(2)
2010–2011	→ Girona (loan)	36	(0)
2011–2014	Blackpool	65	(1)
2014–2015	Millwall	4	(0)
2015–2017	Chesterfield	12	(0)
2017–2021	Sabadell	111	(2)
Total		360	(14)

International career
2005	Spain U19	3	(0)
2008	Spain U21	3	(0)
2007–2008	Catalonia	2	(0)
- * Club domestic league appearances and goals

Ángel Martínez Cervera (born 31 January 1986), known simply as Ángel, is a Spanish former professional footballer who played as a midfielder.

He began his career with Espanyol, appearing in 59 competitive games and reaching the 2007 UEFA Cup final. Subsequently, he played in England, starting out at Blackpool for whom he signed in 2011.

== Club career ==
=== Espanyol ===
Born in Girona, Catalonia, Ángel was a product of RCD Espanyol's youth system. He appeared in seven La Liga matches with the first team during the 2006–07 season, the first on 11 March 2007 in a 1–1 away draw against Racing de Santander. He added two appearances in their runner-up run in the UEFA Cup, winning both games.

In the following campaign, Ángel was an important element in the Catalan side, scoring in wins at Sevilla FC (3–2) and CA Osasuna (2–1) and finishing with 28 league appearances. After Mauricio Pochettino's arrival as coach in January 2009, however, he was deemed surplus to requirements: after a loan move had been arranged until the end of the season with Segunda División club Gimnàstic de Tarragona, the deal collapsed as Espanyol did not sign, as originally intended, Argentine midfielder Oscar Ahumada before the 31st deadline.

Ángel was loaned to Rayo Vallecano in the second division for 2009–10, in a season-long move. He was a regular for the Madrid outskirts team, as they retained their status.

In late July 2010, still owned by Espanyol, Ángel signed with another club in that tier, hometown's Girona FC, sharing teams with his brother José. He made his official debut on 28 August, playing 68 minutes in a 4–2 home victory over CD Tenerife, and started in 25 of his league appearances – totalling nearly 2,000 minutes of play – during the season in an eventual 11th-place finish.

=== Blackpool ===
On 25 July 2011, Ángel signed a two-year contract with English Championship side Blackpool, which included an option for a third year. He made his official debut on 11 August in a penalty shootout loss against Sheffield Wednesday in the first round of the League Cup, and first appeared in the league on 27 September, in a 2–2 draw with Coventry City at the Ricoh Arena.

Toward the end of the season, Ángel became a regular starter for the Seasiders, with manager Ian Holloway saying of him: "He's growing into the country, he's learning to speak English and he's settled down now. Ludovic Sylvestre is really unlucky but I'd be crazy to leave out Ángel. He's almost the first name on the teamsheet at the moment." On 17 April 2012, the day after the manager's comments, he scored his first goal for the team, the only in a victory over Leeds United at Bloomfield Road.

Ángel played 26 games in 2013–14, as Blackpool narrowly avoided relegation after finishing in 20th position; he was also chosen as their Community Player of the Year. Due to the unrest at the club because of the Oystons' ownership, he turned down the offer of a new deal at the end of the campaign.

=== Millwall ===
On 2 September 2014, Ángel agreed to a one-year deal with fellow second-tier Millwall, reuniting with former Blackpool boss Holloway. He appeared in his first competitive game on 12 December, starting and playing 89 minutes in a 1–0 defeat of Brighton & Hove Albion.

=== Chesterfield ===
Ángel signed for Chesterfield on 16 August 2015, agreeing to a two-year deal. He picked up an anterior cruciate ligament knee injury in September, going on to be sidelined for 15 months.

Ángel returned to action for the Spireites on 13 December 2016, in their 8–0 win against Aston United for the DCFA Senior Challenge Cup.

=== Sabadell ===
Aged 31, Ángel returned to both his country and his native region, joining Segunda División B's CE Sabadell FC on 23 August 2017. Three days later, in the second round of the season, he came on as a 62nd-minute substitute in a 2–0 away win over UE Olot, with his sibling José playing the entire match for the opposition.

Ángel featured regularly during his spell at the Estadi de la Nova Creu Alta, helping to promote to the second division in 2020. On 3 June 2021, the 35-year-old retired from professional football.

== International career ==
Ángel made three appearances for the Spain under-19 team in 2005, adding another three for the under-21s three years later.

== Personal life ==
Ángel's older brother, José, was also a footballer. A defender, he played mainly with Girona, coinciding with his sibling in 2010–11.

Ángel had two daughters, the younger of which was born in Blackpool.

== Career statistics ==
Appearances and goals by club, season and competition
Club	Season	Division	League		National Cup		League Cup		Europe		Other		Total	
Club	Season	Division	Apps	Goals	Apps	Goals	Apps	Goals	App	Goals	Apps	Goals	Apps	Goals
Espanyol B	2006–07	Segunda División B	27	5	0	0	0	0	—		0	0	27	5
Espanyol	2006–07	La Liga	7	0	0	0	0	0	2 (Note: Appearances in UEFA Cup)	0	0	0	9	0
Espanyol	2007–08	La Liga	28	2	2	0	0	0	—		0	0	30	2
Espanyol	2008–09	La Liga	15	0	5	0	0	0	—		0	0	20	0
Espanyol	Total		50	2	7	0	0	0	2	0	0	0	59	2
Rayo Vallecano	2009–10	Segunda División	27	2	4	0	0	0	—		0	0	31	2
Girona	2010–11	Segunda División	36	0	1	0	0	0	—		0	0	37	0
Blackpool	2011–12	Championship	15	1	4	0	1	0	—		3 (Note: Appearances in Championship play-offs)	0	23	1
Blackpool	2012–13	Championship	21	0	0	0	1	0	—		0	0	22	0
Blackpool	2013–14	Championship	26	0	1	0	1	0	—		0	0	28	0
Blackpool	Total		62	1	5	0	3	0	—		3	0	73	1
Millwall	2014–15	Championship	4	0	0	0	0	0	—		0	0	4	0
Chesterfield	2015–16	League One	3	0	0	0	0	0	—		0	0	3	0
Chesterfield	2016–17	League One	9	0	0	0	0	0	—		0	0	9	0
Chesterfield	Total		12	0	0	0	0	0	—		0	0	12	0
Sabadell	2017–18	Segunda División B	36	0	0	0	0	0	—		0	0	36	0
Sabadell	2018–19	Segunda División B	34	1	0	0	0	0	—		0	0	34	1
Sabadell	2019–20	Segunda División B	23	1	0	0	0	0	—		2 (Note: Appearances in Segunda División B play-offs)	0	25	1
Sabadell	2020–21	Segunda División	18	0	1	0	0	0	—		0	0	19	0
Sabadell	Total		111	2	1	0	0	0	—		2	0	114	2
Career total			329	12	18	0	3	0	2	0	5	0	357	12

== Honours ==
Espanyol

- UEFA Cup runner-up: 2006–07
