= Manuel Reyes =

Spanish politician (born 1976)

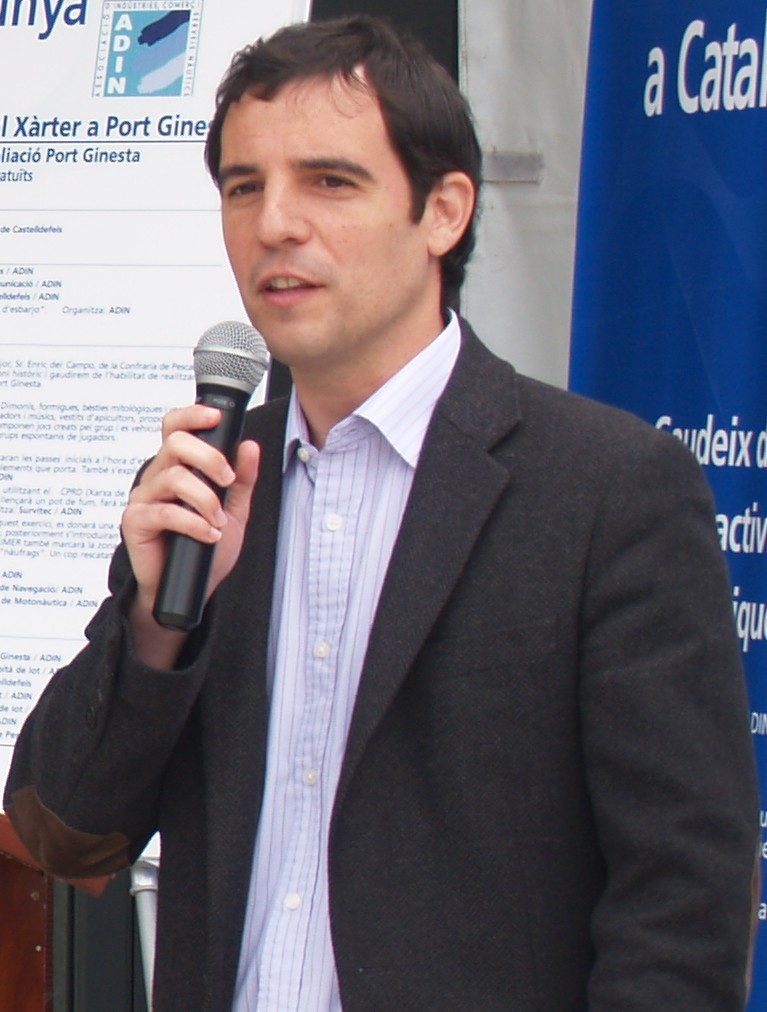
- Reyes in 2012

Member of the Parliament of Catalonia
- Incumbent
- Assumed office 10 June 2024
- Constituency: Barcelona
- In office 13 October 2020 – 21 December 2020
- Preceded by: Esperanza García
- Constituency: Barcelona
- In office 17 December 2012 – 4 August 2015
- Constituency: Barcelona

Personal details
- Born: 16 May 1976 (age 50)
- Party: People's Party

Manuel Reyes López (born 16 May 1976) is a Spanish politician. He has been a member of the Parliament of Catalonia since 2024, having previously served from 2012 to 2015 and from October to December 2020. He has served as mayor of Castelldefels since 2023, having previously served from 2011 to 2015.
