= 2013–14 Blackpool F.C. season =

English football club season

Blackpool F.C.
2013–14 season
- Owner: Owen Oyston
- Chairman: Karl Oyston
- Manager: Paul Ince (until 21 January 2014); Barry Ferguson (as caretaker manager) (21 January 2014 – 3 May 2014)
- Stadium: Bloomfield Road; Blackpool, England (Capacity: 17,338)
- Football League Championship: 20th
- FA Cup: Third round^{1}
- League Cup: First round
- Top goalscorer: League: Tom Ince (7); All: Tom Ince (7)
Home colours	Away colours

The 2013–14 season was Blackpool's third-consecutive season in the Football League Championship, the second tier of English professional football, and their 105th overall season in the Football League.

== Season summary ==
Blackpool also competed in the League Cup, going out in the first round, and the FA Cup, exiting in the third round.

The season was to be Paul Ince's first full season as manager, but on 21 January 2014 he was sacked from the role; a full-time replacement was not named. Barry Ferguson was installed as caretaker manager on 21 January and remained in the role until the end of the season.

=== Pre-season ===
Incoming transfers during the pre-season period included Scottish central defender and later captain Gary MacKenzie, who signed from MK Dons on the eve of their opening friendly for an undisclosed fee. Striker Bobby Grant joined from Rochdale, also for a fee that was not publicly stated. An unattached Michael Chopra and fellow striker Steven Davies (£500,000 from Bristol City) also joined the ranks. On 1 August, Jack Robinson joined on a season-long loan from Liverpool. The following day, the eve of the season proper kick-off, Neal Bishop signed from Notts County on a five-month contract.

Outbound, on free transfers, went Ashley Eastham (Rochdale), Stephen Crainey (Wigan Athletic), Alex Baptiste (Bolton Wanderers), Kevin Phillips (to Ian Holloway's Crystal Palace), Neal Eardley (Birmingham City) and Tiago Gomes (released).

The World Group Stadium, home of Penrith, was the venue for Blackpool's opening pre-season friendly on 6 July. Matt Phillips and Tom Ince were the scorers for the visitors as they ran out 2–0 winners.

A week later, they made the short trip up the Fylde Coast to take on Morecambe at the Globe Arena. Tom Ince was again on the score sheet in a 1–1 draw.

On 16 July, The Seasiders lost to a Kendal Town XI. Trialist Caleb Folan netted for Blackpool.

Two days later, Blackpool travelled to Witton Albion and won 3–0. Tom Ince, Tom Barkhuizen and Craig Cathcart were the scorers.

On 20 July, Blackpool crossed the Pennines to face York City. The hosts went ahead on 55 minutes, but Bobby Grant levelled matters a minute later in what was the final goal of the game.

Three days later, Blackpool visited Bury and again came away with a 1–1 draw. Kirk Broadfoot was the scorer for the Tangerines.

Pre-season was closed out with the a first fixture at Bloomfield Road. Premier League outfit Newcastle United were the visitors, and the Magpies returned to the North East with a 1–0 victory under their belt.

In their seven pre-season fixtures, Blackpool won two, drew three and lost two.

=== Season proper ===
Blackpool's opening fixture, on 3 August, was at Doncaster Rovers. The visitors won 3–1, with goals from Steven Davies, Gary MacKenzie and Tom Ince.

Two days later, Blackpool exited the League Cup at the hands of arch-rivals Preston North End.

Barnsley were the visitors to Bloomfield Road on 10 August. A single goal, put into his own net by Scott Golbourne (wrongly credited as Scott Wiseman), gave the hosts all three points.

An unattached Ricardo Fuller joined Blackpool on a free transfer on 15 August, and the following day, Nathan Delfouneso, a loanee at the club last season, returned on a six-month loan.

On 17 August, Blackpool travelled to Middlesbrough, with whom they fought out a 1–1 draw. Chris Basham scored the goal for Paul Ince's men.

A week later, Blackpool hosted Reading. A Tom Barkhuizen goal, his first in professional football, gave the Seasiders all three points and put them top of the table, on goal difference, ahead of Leicester City and Q.P.R.

Young right back Charles Dunne joined Blackpool from Wycombe Wanderers for an undisclosed fee on 23 August, the same day that Matt Phillips left for pastures new at Q.P.R.

On 31 August, Watford visited the seaside. Tom Ince netted the only goal of the game to give Blackpool the victory.

Bradley Orr joined the squad on a five-month loan deal from Blackburn Rovers on 2 September. The same day, forward Nathan Tyson signed on a free transfer from Derby County.

After a two-week international break, Blackpool made it five wins from their opening six League games — their best-ever start to a campaign — with a 2–1 victory at Bournemouth, despite having Jack Robinson dismissed. Ricardo Fuller and Neal Bishop got the goals. Blackpool remained top of the table, ahead of Harry Redknapp's Q.P.R., on goal difference. After an altercation in the Dean Court tunnel with an official, Paul Ince was given a five-match stadium ban and was fined £4,000.

On 17 September, Blackpool suffered their first defeat of the League campaign. It came at Millwall. Tom Ince scored the visitors’ goal. The three goals they conceded saw them slip to third place in the table.

Four days later, Blackpool hosted Leicester City. Chris Basham and Tom Ince scored for the Tangerines in a 2–2 draw.

Huddersfield Town was the destination on 27 September. Ricard Fuller scored his second goal of the campaign in a 1–1 draw. Ángel was sent off for Blackpool.

October was rung in with a goalless draw at home to Bolton Wanderers, followed by the same result at Charlton Athletic on 5 October.

On the eve of the Charlton game, Dan Gosling joined on loan from Newcastle United.

After another international break, Blackpool mustered their first victory in five games when a Tom Ince penalty was enough to see off Wigan Athletic on 19 October.

Blackburn Rovers visited Bloomfield Road for a Lancashire derby on 26 October. Another Tom Ince penalty, coupled with a first goal for the club by Dan Gosling, helped Blackpool to a 2–2 draw. Jack Robinson was sent off for the second time this season.

On 2 November, Blackpool visited Nottingham Forest. Proving that they are Forest manager Billy Davies’ bogey team, Blackpool returned home with all three points thanks to Stephen Dobbie's last-minute strike. Dobbie had joined Blackpool on loan for the fourth time on 18 September, this time from Crystal Palace.

Seven days later, Blackpool suffered their second defeat of the campaign, 2–3 at home to Ipswich Town. Stephen Dobbie scored Blackpool's first goal. Steven Davies scored what was an equaliser to make it 2–2 in injury time, but Ipswich still found time to edge ahead again to win the game.

After a fortnight break, Blackpool travelled to Birmingham City on 23 November. Ricard Fuller scored the second goal of a game that finished 1–1.

A week later, Blackpool beat Sheffield Wednesday 2–0 at Bloomfield Road, with goals from Ricardo Fuller and Dan Gosling. It was, however, from this point on that Blackpool's long descent down the table began. Indeed, they would not see another victory for seventeen League games (or 1,530 minutes).

Blackpool travelled to Yeovil Town on 3 December and lost to a solitary goal, despite having three players (Ricardo Fuller, Kirk Broadfoot and Gary MacKenzie) sent off.

Four days later, they were thrashed 5–1 at Derby County, despite taking a third-minute lead through Isaiah Osbourne. Blackpool had Neal Bishop and Ángel sent off, meaning five players had been dismissed in two games.

On 14 December, Q.P.R. left Bloomfield Road with all through points after a 2–0 victory.

The following weekend, Lancashire rivals Burnley beat Blackpool 2–1 at Turf Moor. Craig Cathcart scored for the visitors.

A point was gained in a Boxing Day draw at Leeds United. Tom Ince, with his first goal since the end of October, scored for Blackpool. It was his seventh and final goal before a loan move to Crystal Palace in January. Kirk Broadfoot was sent off for the second time in a month.

On 29 December, a battle-of-the-seasides was won by Brighton.

2014 was seen in with a 2–0 defeat at Sheffield Wednesday.

Blackpool exited their second cup competition at the first hurdle on 4 January. This time it was the FA Cup, and Bolton Wanderers were the ones who progressed to the fourth round.

On 11 January, Middlesbrough visited Bloomfield Road and took all three points.

The following Friday saw David Perkins' arrival on loan from Barnsley. He could not face his parent club the next day, when Blackpool returned with a defeat, their fourth-successive. It was after this game, on 21 January, that Paul Ince, Steve Thompson and Alex Rae were relieved of their duties. Club captain Barry Ferguson was installed as caretaker player-manager, and although he initially stated that he would not be taking to the field during his tenure in the role, he pulled on his boots for two games towards the end of the campaign.

Ferguson quickly brought in a few new faces on loan to try to change Blackpool's fortunes. David Goodwillie came in from Blackburn Rovers; Andy Halliday from Middlesbrough; Andy Keogh from Millwall; and Tony McMahon from Sheffield United.

"[Karl] was alright that transfer window, when he knew for them to go from the Championship to League One, the club were going to lose a fortune. So he gave me a bit of money to go and get Halliday, Goodwillie, and I brought in another two or three players." – Barry Ferguson in September 2020

A point was gained on 25 January with Doncaster Rovers’ visit. Andy Halliday scored Blackpool's goal, their first in those four games.

A 5–1 defeat at Reading followed on 28 January. Steven Davies scored for the visitors.

On 31 January, Belgian midfielder Faris Haroun became Barry Ferguson's fifth new face.

The first day of February saw another loss, this time at Blackburn Rovers.

Elliot Grandin returned to Blackpool on a free transfer after being released by Crystal Palace. Also coming in was Kevin Foley, on loan from Wolves. Bob Harris, meanwhile, joined Sheffield United on a permanent basis, having been on loan to the Blades.

The ship was steadied on 8 February with a point at home to Nottingham Forest. Andy Keogh, on loan from Ian Holloway's new club, Millwall, scored late in the game to give Blackpool a share of the points.

Another draw, this time goalless, followed after a visit to Ipswich Town.

A run of three consecutive defeats began on 22 February with Birmingham's visit to Bloomfield Road. Andy Keogh scored his second goal for the club in the 1–2 scoreline. Jack Robinson saw red for the third time this season. It was Blackpool's tenth dismissal of the campaign.

Watford were 4–0 victors at Vicarage Road on 1 March.

Bournemouth exacted revenge for their defeat at Dean Court in September with a single-goal victory at Bloomfield Road on 8 March.

Three days later, Barry Ferguson picked up his first win in charge — and Blackpool's first in eighteen games in all competitions — with a victory over Ian Holloway's Millwall. Ricardo Fuller scored the only goal of the game.

On 15 March, Blackpool visited table-topping Leicester City. Despite taking the lead through loanee David Goodwillie, the Seasiders went on to lose 3–1.

Robert Earnshaw joined Blackpool on a free transfer on 21 March.

The following day, Blackpool made it six points out of nine with a single-goal victory over Huddersfield Town. Ricardo Fuller scored the goal, his sixth of the season, which put him one behind leading scorer Tom Ince. Blackpool now sat in 18th position, nine points clear of the relegation zone with nine games remaining.

On 25 March, Blackpool lost by a single goal to Bolton Wanderers at the Reebok Stadium.

Three days later, Greek striker Apostolos Vellios became Barry Ferguson's ninth signing when he joined on loan from Everton until the end of the season. Out on loan, meanwhile, went James Caton (Chester), Nathan Eccleston (Coventry City) and Anderson Banvo (Stevenage).

Blackpool earned a 1–1 draw at Q.P.R. on 29 March. David Goodwillie scored his second goal in four games for the Seasiders, who slipped one place to 19th. Barnsley were victorious at Yeovil, which reduced the gap between Blackpool and the relegation places to seven points.

They lost 2–1 at home to bottom-of-the-table Yeovil Town on 5 April, a result that saw them fall one place to 20th, six points clear of the relegation zone.

Three further defeats followed — at home to Derby on 8 April (which left them three points above Millwall and the drop zone) and at Leeds United on 12 April. Millwall drew on the latter match day, narrowing the gap between them to two points. Blackpool had now lost twenty league games in a season for the first time since 1999–2000. The fourth consecutive defeat occurred against Burnley at Bloomfield Road on 18 April. Millwall played Middlesbrough the following day, winning 2–1, a result that put Blackpool into the relegation zone for the first time.

A draw was obtained at Brighton on 21 April, but Blackpool remained in the bottom three.

A victory, at Wigan Athletic on 26 April, lifted Blackpool up to 18th. It was their first away victory since 2 November, and the first time they had scored twice in a game since 30 November. Birmingham City took their place in the relegation zone. Blackpool sat three points clear of the Blues but had played one game more.

The season was rounded out with a 3–0 home defeat by Charlton Athletic. Results elsewhere went in Blackpool's favour, however, and they finished in 20th position, two points clear of Doncaster, who were relegated.

"We weren't great to watch. We were shit to watch. We had to play a certain way. But, you know what, I kept them up." – Barry Ferguson in September 2020

Eight players either returned to their parent club or returned to the free-agent market upon the season's completion: Jack Robinson, Neal Bishop, Andy Halliday, Faris Haroun, Andy Keogh, David Goodwillie, Stephen Dobbie and Robert Earnshaw.

== Statistics ==
=== Appearances and goals ===
No.	Pos	Nat	Player	Total		League		FA Cup		League Cup	
No.	Pos	Nat	Player	Apps	Goals	Apps	Goals	Apps	Goals	Apps	Goals
1	GK	(Scotland) SCO	Matt Gilks	48	0	46+0	0	1+0	0	1+0	0
2	DF	(England) ENG	Tony McMahon	18	0	18+0	0	0+0	0	0+0	0
2	DF	(England) ENG	Bradley Orr	4	0	3+1	0	0+0	0	0+0	0
3	DF	(England) ENG	Jack Robinson	36	0	33+1	0	1+0	0	1+0	0
4	MF	(England) ENG	Dan Gosling	14	2	13+1	2	0+0	0	0+0	0
4	MF	(England) ENG	David Perkins	20	0	20+0	0	0+0	0	0+0	0
5	DF	(Scotland) SCO	Gary MacKenzie	37	1	35+0	1	1+0	0	1+0	0
6	DF	(Scotland) SCO	Kirk Broadfoot	34	0	33+0	0	0+0	0	1+0	0
7	FW	(England) ENG	Nathan Tyson	10	0	0+10	0	0+0	0	0+0	0
8	FW	(England) ENG	Michael Chopra	20	0	5+13	0	0+1	0	1+0	0
9	FW	(England) ENG	Steve Davies	29	3	13+15	3	0+0	0	1+0	0
10	FW	(England) ENG	Bobby Grant	7	0	5+1	0	0+0	0	0+1	0
11	MF	(England) ENG	Tom Ince	25	7	22+1	7	1+0	0	1+0	0
12	MF	(England) ENG	Neal Bishop	36	1	29+6	1	1+0	0	0+0	0
14	MF	(England) ENG	Nathan Delfouneso	11	0	3+8	0	0+0	0	0+0	0
14	MF	(Scotland) SCO	Andy Halliday	18	1	12+6	1	0+0	0	0+0	0
15	MF	(Belgium) BEL	Faris Haroun	9	0	5+4	0	0+0	0	0+0	0
16	MF	(Scotland) SCO	Barry Ferguson	21	0	18+1	0	1+0	0	1+0	0
17	MF	(England) ENG	Chris Basham	42	2	37+3	2	1+0	0	1+0	0
18	MF	(England) ENG	Isaiah Osbourne	24	1	23+1	1	0+0	0	0+0	0
19	FW	(Jamaica) JAM	Ricardo Fuller	28	6	22+5	6	1+0	0	0+0	0
20	DF	(Northern Ireland) NIR	Craig Cathcart	32	1	29+1	1	1+0	0	1+0	0
22	MF	(England) ENG	James Caton	2	0	0+2	0	0+0	0	0+0	0
23	MF	(England) ENG	Nathan Eccleston	5	0	2+2	0	0+1	0	0+0	0
24	FW	(Republic of Ireland) IRL	Andy Keogh	14	3	9+5	3	0+0	0	0+0	0
24	MF	(Netherlands) NED	Marvin Zeegelaar	2	0	0+2	0	0+0	0	0+0	0
25	DF	(England) ENG	Tyler Blackett	5	0	5+0	0	0+0	0	0+0	0
25	FW	(Scotland) SCO	David Goodwillie	13	3	8+5	3	0+0	0	0+0	0
27	FW	(England) ENG	Tom Barkhuizen	15	2	2+12	1	1+0	1	0+0	0
30	FW	(England) ENG	Louis Almond	1	0	0+1	0	0+0	0	0+0	0
31	MF	(Spain) ESP	Ángel Martínez	28	0	18+8	0	1+0	0	1+0	0
33	FW	(Scotland) SCO	Stephen Dobbie	27	4	23+4	4	0+0	0	0+0	0
33	DF	(Scotland) SCO	Bob Harris	4	0	2+2	0	0+0	0	0+0	0
35	DF	(England) ENG	Harrison McGahey	4	0	4+0	0	0+0	0	0+0	0
39	MF	(France) FRA	Elliot Grandin	7	1	3+4	1	0+0	0	0+0	0
40	DF	(Republic of Ireland) IRL	Kevin Foley	5	0	4+1	0	0+0	0	0+0	0
41	FW	(Greece) GRE	Apostolos Vellios	2	0	2+0	0	0+0	0	0+0	0
50	FW	(Wales) WAL	Robert Earnshaw	1	1	0+1	1	0+0	0	0+0	0

- Players used: 38
- Goals scored: 39 (38 League; 1 FA Cup)

=== Disciplinary record ===
No.	Pos.	Name	League		FA Cup		League Cup		Total	
No.	Pos.	Name	Booked	Sent off (straight red)	Booked	Sent off (straight red)	Booked	Sent off (straight red)	Booked	Sent off (straight red)
1	GK	(Scotland) Matt Gilks	2	0	0	0	0	0	2	0
2	DF	(England) Tony McMahon	4	0	0	0	0	0	4	0
3	DF	(England) Jack Robinson	5	3	0	0	0	0	5	3
4	MF	(England) Dan Gosling	3	0	0	0	0	0	3	0
4	MF	(England) David Perkins	4	0	0	0	0	0	4	0
5	DF	(Scotland) Gary MacKenzie	5	1	0	0	0	0	5	1
6	DF	(Scotland) Kirk Broadfoot	4	2	0	0	0	0	4	2
7	FW	(England) Nathan Tyson	1	0	0	0	0	0	1	0
8	FW	(England) Michael Chopra	0	0	0	0	1	0	1	0
9	FW	(England) Steve Davies	2	0	0	0	0	0	2	0
11	MF	(England) Tom Ince	1	0	0	0	0	0	1	0
12	MF	(England) Neal Bishop	7	1	0	0	0	0	7	1
14	MF	(Scotland) Andy Halliday	3	0	0	0	0	0	3	0
15	MF	(Belgium) Faris Haroun	1	0	0	0	0	0	1	0
16	MF	(Scotland) Barry Ferguson	3	0	0	0	0	0	3	0
17	MF	(England) Chris Basham	9	0	0	0	0	0	9	0
18	MF	(England) Isaiah Osbourne	9	0	0	0	0	0	9	0
19	MF	(Jamaica) Ricardo Fuller	3	1	0	0	0	0	3	1
20	DF	(Northern Ireland) Craig Cathcart	2	0	0	0	0	0	2	0
25	FW	(Scotland) David Goodwillie	1	0	0	0	0	0	1	0
27	FW	(England) Tom Barkhuizen	1	0	0	0	0	0	1	0
31	MF	(Spain) Ángel Martínez	3	2	0	0	0	0	3	2
33	FW	(Scotland) Stephen Dobbie	3	0	0	0	0	0	3	0
33	DF	(Scotland) Bob Harris	1	0	0	0	0	0	1	0
35	DF	(England) Harrison McGahey	1	0	0	0	0	0	1	0
Total			78	10	0	0	1	0	79	10

== Results ==
=== Pre-season friendlies ===
6 July 2013	Penrith	0–2	Blackpool	Penrith
15:00			Phillips; Ince	Stadium: Frenchfield Park

13 July 2013	Morecambe	1–1	Blackpool	Morecambe
12:00			Ince	Stadium: Globe Arena

16 July 2013	Kendal Town XI	3–1	Blackpool	Kendal
12:00			Folan	Stadium: Cosyseal Stadium

18 July 2013	Witton Albion	0–3	Blackpool	Northwich
12:00			Ince; Barkhuizen; Cathcart	Stadium: Wincham Park

20 July 2013	York City	1–1	Blackpool	York
15:00	Coulson 55'		Grant 56'	Stadium: Bootham Crescent

23 July 2013	Bury	1–1	Blackpool	Bury
15:00			Broadfoot	Stadium: Gigg Lane

28 July 2013	Blackpool	0–1	Newcastle United	Blackpool
15:00 BST UTC+1			Ameobi 5'	Stadium: Bloomfield Road

=== Championship ===
3 August 2013 1	Doncaster Rovers	1–3	Blackpool	Doncaster
15:00	Jones 60'	Report	Davies 17'; MacKenzie 88'; Ince 90+5'	Stadium: Keepmoat Stadium; Attendance: 9,002; Referee: Andy Woolmer

10 August 2013 2	Blackpool	1–0	Barnsley	Blackpool
15:00	Wiseman 90+4' (o.g.)	Report		Stadium: Bloomfield Road; Attendance: 14,268; Referee: Stephen Martin

17 August 2013 3	Middlesbrough	1–1	Blackpool	Middlesbrough
15:00	Emnes 90+4'	Report	Basham 83'	Stadium: Riverside Stadium; Attendance: 13,993; Referee: Kettle

24 August 2013 4	Blackpool	1–0	Reading	Blackpool
15:00	Barkhuizen 75'	Report		Stadium: Bloomfield Road; Attendance: 12,928; Referee: Webb

31 August 2013 5	Blackpool	1–0	Watford	Blackpool
15:00	Ince 81'	Report		Stadium: Bloomfield Road; Attendance: 13,345; Referee: Eltrigham

14 September 2013 6	Bournemouth	1–2	Blackpool	Bournemouth
15:00		Report	Fuller 7'; Robinson (yellow card) 28' (yellow-red card) 59'; Bishop 48'	Stadium: Dean Court; Attendance: 9,446; Referee: Langford

17 September 2013 7	Millwall	3–1	Blackpool	London
19:45	Trotter 45+3' (pen.); Bailey 73'; Morison 74'	Report	Ince 16'	Stadium: The New Den; Attendance: 8,415; Referee: Bratt

21 September 2013 8	Blackpool	2–2	Leicester City	Blackpool
15:00	Basham 19'; Ince 90+1' (pen.)	Report	Konchesky 72' (pen.); King 74'	Stadium: Bloomfield Road; Attendance: 15,317; Referee: Duncan

27 September 2013 9	Huddersfield Town	1–1	Blackpool	Huddersfield
19:45	Vaughan 62'	Report	Fuller 27'; Martínez (yellow card) 54' (yellow-red card) 83'	Stadium: John Smith's Stadium; Attendance: 12,337; Referee: Mathieson

1 October 2013 10	Blackpool	0–0	Bolton Wanderers	Blackpool
19:45		Report		Stadium: Bloomfield Road; Attendance: 13,819; Referee: Swarbrick

5 October 2013 11	Charlton Athletic	0–0	Blackpool	London
15:00		Report		Stadium: The Valley; Referee: Hill

19 October 2013 12	Blackpool	1–0	Wigan Athletic	Blackpool
12:15	Ince 24' (pen.)	Report		Stadium: Bloomfield Road; Attendance: 15,721; Referee: Haywood

26 October 2013 13	Blackpool	2–2	Blackburn Rovers	Blackpool
15:00	Ince 13' (pen.); Gosling 39'	Report	Rhodes 21' (pen.); Davies 90+2' (o.g.)	Stadium: Bloomfield Road; Attendance: 15,901; Referee: Tierney

2 November 2013 14	Nottingham Forest	0–1	Blackpool	Nottingham
15:00	Abdoun (red card)	Report	Dobbie 90+1'	Stadium: The City Ground; Referee: Naylor

9 November 2013 15	Blackpool	2–3	Ipswich Town	Blackpool
15:00	Dobbie 23'; Davies 90+1'	Report	Nouble 65'; Taylor 84'; Murphy 90+3'	Stadium: Bloomfield Road; Attendance: 13,525; Referee: Williamson

23 November 2013 16	Birmingham City	1–1	Blackpool	Birmingham
15:00	Lingard 27'	Report	Fuller 36'	Stadium: St Andrew's; Attendance: 14,480; Referee: Pawson

30 November 2013 17	Blackpool	2–0	Sheffield Wednesday	Blackpool
15:00	Fuller 6'; Gosling 73'	Report		Stadium: Bloomfield Road; Attendance: 14,452; Referee: Hooper

3 December 2013 18	Yeovil Town	1–0	Blackpool	Yeovil
19:45	Lundstram 21'	Report	Broadfoot (yellow card) 84' (yellow-red card) 90'; Fuller (red card) 90+2'; MacKenzie (yellow card) 86' (yellow-red card) 90+5'	Stadium: Huish Park; Attendance: 5,530; Referee: Sarginson

7 December 2013 19	Derby County	5–1	Blackpool	Derby
12:15	Martin 47' (pen.), 53', 69' (pen.); Bryson 57'; Keogh 90+2'	Report	Osbourne 3'; Bishop (red card) 69'; Martínez (yellow card) 84' (yellow-red card) 87'	Stadium: Pride Park; Attendance: 24,063; Referee: Haines

14 December 2013 20	Blackpool	0–2	Queens Park Rangers	Blackpool
15:00		Report	Phillips 61'; Austin 73'	Stadium: Bloomfield Road; Attendance: 13,822; Referee: Attwell

21 December 2013 21	Burnley	2–1	Blackpool	Burnley
15:00	Ings 7'; Arfield 47'	Report	Cathcart 24'	Stadium: Turf Moor; Attendance: 14,489; Referee: East

26 December 2013 22	Blackpool	1–1	Leeds United	Blackpool
12:30	Ince 65'; Broadfoot (red card) 90'	Report	Peltier 25'	Stadium: Bloomfield Road; Attendance: 15,552; Referee: Mathieson

29 December 2013 23	Blackpool	0–1	Brighton & Hove Albion	Blackpool
15:00	MacKenzie (yellow card) 62'; Basham (yellow card) 77'	Report	Calderón 38'	Stadium: Bloomfield Road; Attendance: 12,280; Referee: Anthony Taylor

1 January 2014 24	Sheffield Wednesday	2–0	Blackpool	Sheffield
15:00	Wickham 50'; Maguire 60'	Report		Stadium: Hillsborough; Attendance: 19,447; Referee: Whitestone

11 January 2014 25	Blackpool	0–2	Middlesbrough	Blackpool
15:00		Report	Carayol 84', 90+3'	Stadium: Bloomfield Road; Attendance: 14,421; Referee: Russell

18 January 2014 26	Barnsley	2–0	Blackpool	Barnsley
15:00	O'Grady 45+4' (pen.), 48'	Report		Stadium: Oakwell; Attendance: 9,866; Referee: Lewis

25 January 2014 27	Blackpool	1–1	Doncaster Rovers	Blackpool
15:00	Halliday 78'	Report	Sharp 85'	Stadium: Bloomfield Road; Attendance: 13,468; Referee: Coote

28 January 2014 28	Reading	5–1	Blackpool	Reading
20:00	Le Fondre 7', 17', 67'; Pogrebnyak 52'; Robson-Kanu 82'	Report	Davies 65'	Stadium: Madejski Stadium; Attendance: 16,636; Referee: Friend

1 February 2014 29	Blackburn Rovers	2–0	Blackpool	Blackburn
15:00	Dunn 20'; Hanley 83'	Report		Stadium: Ewood Park; Attendance: 15,045; Referee: Naylor

8 February 2014 30	Blackpool	1–1	Nottingham Forest	Blackpool
15:00	Keogh 86'	Report	Lascelles 45'	Stadium: Bloomfield Road; Attendance: 15,105; Referee: Boyeson

15 February 2014 31	Ipswich Town	0–0	Blackpool	Ipswich
15:00		Report		Stadium: Portman Road; Attendance: 16,010; Referee: Haywood

22 February 2014 32	Blackpool	1–2	Birmingham City	Blackpool
15:00	Keogh 22'; Robinson (red card) 75'	Report	Novak 63', 82'	Stadium: Bloomfield Road; Attendance: 14,628; Referee: Haines

1 March 2014 33	Watford	4–0	Blackpool	Watford
15:00	Ranegie 15', 39'; Deeney 35', 74'	Report		Stadium: Vicarage Road; Attendance: 14,586; Referee: Linington

8 March 2014 34	Blackpool	0–1	Bournemouth	Blackpool
15:00		Report	Grabban 48' (pen.)	Stadium: Bloomfield Road; Attendance: 13,043; Referee: Ward

11 March 2014 35	Blackpool	1–0	Millwall	Blackpool
20:00	Fuller 14'	Report		Stadium: Bloomfield Road; Attendance: 12,412; Referee: Madley

15 March 2014 36	Leicester City	3–1	Blackpool	Leicester
15:00	Mahrez 60'; Morgan 82'; Phillips 87'	Report	Goodwillie 14'	Stadium: King Power Stadium; Attendance: 27,669; Referee: Miller

22 March 2014 37	Blackpool	1–0	Huddersfield Town	Blackpool
15:00	Fuller 4'	Report		Stadium: Bloomfield Road; Attendance: 14,624; Referee: Lewis

25 March 2014 38	Bolton Wanderers	1–0	Blackpool	Horwich
20:00	Wheater 16'	Report		Stadium: Reebok Stadium; Attendance: 14,903; Referee: Clattenburg

29 March 2014 39	Queens Park Rangers	1–1	Blackpool	London
15:00	Hoilett 78'	Report	Goodwillie 11'	Stadium: Loftus Road; Attendance: 16,638; Referee: Boyeson

5 April 2014 40	Blackpool	1–2	Yeovil Town	Blackpool
15:00	Grandin 78'	Report	Hayter 16' (pen.); Lawrence 74'	Stadium: Bloomfield Road; Attendance: 13,310; Referee: Langford

8 April 2014 41	Blackpool	1–3	Derby County	Blackpool
20:00	Goodwillie 1'	Report	Martin 2'; Bamford 14'; Bryson 19'	Stadium: Bloomfield Road; Attendance: 13,435; Referee: Webb

12 April 2014 42	Leeds United	2–0	Blackpool	Leeds
15:07	Murphy 21', 73'	Report		Stadium: Elland Road; Attendance: 23,416; Referee: Coote

18 April 2014 43	Blackpool	0–1	Burnley	Blackpool
12:15		Report	Kightly 49'	Stadium: Bloomfield Road; Attendance: 16,016; Referee: Oliver

21 April 2014 44	Brighton & Hove Albion	1–1	Blackpool	Falmer
15:00	Stephens 46'	Report	Dobbie 50'	Stadium: Falmer Stadium; Attendance: 27,610; Referee: Russell

26 April 2014 45	Wigan Athletic	0–2	Blackpool	Wigan
15:00		Report	Keogh 60'; Dobbie 70'	Stadium: DW Stadium; Attendance: 19,137; Referee: Andy D'Urso

3 May 2014 46	Blackpool	0–3	Charlton Athletic	Blackpool
12:15		Report	Harriott 61', 82', 90+2'	Stadium: Bloomfield Road; Attendance: 15,515; Referee: Friend

==== League table ====
Pos	Team	Pld	W	D	L	GF	GA	GD	Pts	Promotion, qualification or relegation
18	Charlton Athletic	46	13	12	21	41	61	−20	51	
19	Millwall	46	11	15	20	46	74	−28	48	
20	Blackpool	46	11	13	22	38	66	−28	46	
21	Birmingham City	46	11	11	24	58	74	−16	44	
22	Doncaster Rovers (R)	46	11	11	24	39	70	−31	44	Relegation to Football League One

Source: BBC Sport
Rules for classification: 1) points; 2) goal difference; 3) number of goals scored
(R) Relegated

=== FA Cup ===
4 January 2014 Third round	Bolton Wanderers	2–1	Blackpool	Bolton
15:00	Ngog 10'; Beckford 51'	Report	Barkhuizen 45+1'	Stadium: Reebok Stadium; Attendance: 11,180; Referee: Hooper

=== League Cup ===
5 August 2013 First round	Preston North End	1–0	Blackpool	Preston
19:45 BST	Clarke 87'	Report		Stadium: Deepdale; Attendance: 17,470; Referee: Andy Madley

== Transfers ==
=== In ===
Date	Pos	Nationality	Player	From	Fee	Ref
5 July 2013	DF	SCO	Gary MacKenzie	MK Dons	Undisclosed	
18 July 2013	FW	ENG	Bobby Grant	Rochdale	Undisclosed	
25 July 2013	FW	ENG	Michael Chopra	Unattached	Free transfer	
26 July 2013	FW	ENG	Steve Davies	Bristol City	£500,000	
2 August 2013	FW	ENG	Neal Bishop	Notts County	Free transfer	
15 August 2013	FW	JAM	Ricardo Fuller	Unattached	Free transfer	
23 August 2013	DF	IRL	Charles Dunne	Wycombe Wanderers	Undisclosed	
2 September 2013	FW	ENG	Nathan Tyson	Derby County	Free transfer	
17 January 2014	MF	ENG	David Perkins	Barnsley	Free transfer	
31 January 2014	MF	BEL	Faris Haroun	Middlesbrough	Free transfer	
31 January 2014	DF	ENG	Tony McMahon	Sheffield United	Undisclosed	
February 2014	MF	FRA	Elliot Grandin	Unattached	Free transfer	
March 2014	FW	WAL	Robert Earnshaw	Unattached	Free transfer	

=== Loans in ===
Date from	Pos	Nationality	Player	From	Duration	Ref
1 August 2013	DF	ENG	Jack Robinson	Liverpool	Season-long loan	
16 August 2013	FW	ENG	Nathan Delfouneso	Aston Villa	Six-month loan	
2 September 2013	DF	ENG	Bradley Orr	Blackburn Rovers	Five-month loan	
3 September 2014	DF	NED	Marvin Zeegelaar	Elazığspor	Until January	
18 September 2013	FW	SCO	Stephen Dobbie	Crystal Palace		
4 October 2013	MF	ENG	Dan Gosling	Newcastle United		
24 January 2014	FW	SCO	David Goodwillie	Blackburn Rovers	Until end of season	
24 January 2014	MF	SCO	Andy Halliday	Middlesbrough	One-month loan	
24 January 2014	DF	ENG	Tony McMahon	Sheffield United	Until 31 January	
31 January 2014	DF	IRL	Andy Keogh	Millwall	Until end of season	
31 January 2014	FW	SCO	Stephen Dobbie	Crystal Palace	Until end of season	
February 2014	DF	IRL	Kevin Foley	Wolves		
27 March 2014	FW	GRE	Apostolos Vellios	Everton	Until end of season	

=== Out ===
Date	Pos	Nationality	Player	To	Fee	Ref
14 June 2013	MF	POR	Tiago Gomes		Released	
20 June 2013	DF	ENG	Ashley Eastham	Rochdale	Free transfer	
28 June 2013	DF	SCO	Stephen Crainey	Wigan Athletic	Free transfer	
1 July 2013	DF	ENG	Alex Baptiste	Bolton Wanderers	Free transfer	
1 July 2013	DF	ENG	Neal Eardley	Birmingham City	Free transfer	
20 July 2013	FW	ENG	Kevin Phillips	Crystal Palace	Free transfer	
23 August 2013	MF	SCO	Matt Phillips	QPR	Undisclosed	
February 2014	DF	SCO	Bob Harris	Sheffield United	Undisclosed	

=== Loans out ===
Date from	Pos	Nationality	Player	To	Duration	Ref
13 June 2013	GK	SCO	Chris Kettings	York City		
1 August 2013	MF	ENG	Liam Tomsett	Hyde	Season-long loan	
9 August 2013	DF	ENG	Louis Almond	Hyde	Season-long loan	
23 August 2013	DF	IRL	Charles Dunne	Wycombe Wanderers	Season-long loan	
27 August 2013	MF	ENG	Jake Caprice	St Mirren	Season-long loan	
3 October 2013	MF	ENG	James Caton	Accrington Stanley	One-month loan	
21 November 2013	FW	ENG	Nathan Tyson	Fleetwood Town	until 1 January 2014	
24 January 2014	MF	SCO	Chris Kettings	Hyde	Until end of season	
24 January 2014	DF	SCO	Bob Harris	Sheffield United	One-month loan	
3 March 2014	FW	ENG	Nathan Tyson	Notts County	Until end of season	
February 2014	FW	ENG	Bobby Grant	Fleetwood Town	Season-long loan	
February 2014	MF	ENG	James Caton	Chester	Season-long loan	
26 March 2014	FW	ENG	Nathan Eccleston	Coventry City	Until end of season	
27 March 2014	FW	CIV	Anderson Banvo	Stevenage	Until end of season	

== Notes ==
- ^1 Entered competition in third round
