= Juanlu (footballer, born 1984) =

Spanish footballer

Personal information
- Full name: Juan Luis Hens Lorite
- Date of birth: 7 February 1984 (age 42)
- Place of birth: Fuente Palmera, Spain
- Height: 1.78 m (5 ft 10 in)
- Position: Midfielder

Senior career*
| Years | Team | Apps | (Gls) |
| 2001–2003 | Córdoba B | | |
| 2002–2003 | Córdoba | 16 | (1) |
| 2003–2005 | Valencia B | 80 | (20) |
| 2005–2006 | Valencia | 1 | (0) |
| 2005–2006 | → Lleida (loan) | 23 | (1) |
| 2006–2007 | Hércules | 21 | (3) |
| 2007–2008 | Granada 74 | 23 | (1) |
| 2008–2011 | Tenerife | 100 | (8) |
| 2011–2015 | Girona | 115 | (6) |
| 2015–2017 | Cartagena | 67 | (12) |
| 2017–2018 | Mérida | 1 | (0) |
| Total | | 447 | (52) |

International career
| 2002–2003 | Spain U19 | 4 | (1) |
| 2003 | Spain U20 | 3 | (1) |
- * Club domestic league appearances and goals

Juan Luis Hens Lorite (born 7 February 1984), commonly known as Juanlu, is a Spanish former professional footballer who played as a right midfielder.

== Club career ==
Juanlu was born in Fuente Palmera, Province of Córdoba. After starting out at local Córdoba CF he moved to Valencia CF in January 2003, playing mostly for their reserves. On 23 January 2005, he appeared in the first of five competitive matches with the first team, against Villarreal CF: he came on as a substitute for Francisco Rufete in the seventh minute, being himself replaced at half-time by Marco Di Vaio in an eventual 3–1 La Liga away loss.

After a loan at UE Lleida, Juanlu was released and resumed his career also in the Segunda División, signing a two-year contract with CD Tenerife from Granada 74 CF in July 2008 and contributing four goals in 35 games in his second season as the club returned to the top flight after seven years.

Juanlu scored his first goal in the main tier on 13 December 2009, a consolation in the 2–1 defeat at Getafe CF; he totalled four for the campaign, in an immediate relegation. He was also part of the squad in 2010–11, as the side went down again.

Juanlu then spent four seasons in division two with Girona FC. He netted twice in the 2013 play-offs, but eventually failed to promote.

On 18 August 2015, the 31-year-old Juanlu joined third-tier FC Cartagena. In summer 2017, he moved to Mérida AD of the same league.
