= Néstor Querol =

Spanish footballer

Personal information
- Full name: Néstor Querol Mateu
- Date of birth: 21 September 1987 (age 39)
- Place of birth: Castellón de la Plana, Spain
- Height: 1.84 m (6 ft 0 in)
- Position: Winger

Team information
- Current team: Roda

Youth career
- Castellón

Senior career*
Years	Team	Apps	(Gls)
2006–2009	Castellón B		
2009–2010	Valladolid B	32	(4)
2010–2013	Borriol	108	(12)
2013–2014	Castellón	32	(4)
2014–2015	San Pedro	24	(9)
2015–2017	Saguntino	66	(8)
2017–2018	Badalona	33	(7)
2018–2022	Sabadell	123	(19)
2022–2023	Cultural Leonesa	28	(1)
2023–2024	Saguntino	30	(5)
2024–	Roda	21	(3)
- * Club domestic league appearances and goals as of 26 September 2025

Néstor Querol Mateu (born 21 September 1987) is a Spanish footballer who plays for Roda as a left winger.

== Club career ==
Born in El Grao de Castellón, Castellón de la Plana, Valencian Community, Querol represented CD Castellón as a youth, and made his senior debut with the reserves in the 2006–07 season, in Tercera División. In 2009, he moved to another reserve team, Real Valladolid Promesas also in the fourth tier.

On 24 June 2013, Querol returned to Castellón after a three-season spell at fellow fourth division side CF Borriol. Released the following June, he went on to represent hometown side CF San Pedro in the regional leagues and Atlético Saguntino in the fourth tier, achieving promotion to Segunda División B with the latter in 2016.

In 2017, Querol agreed to a contract with CF Badalona in the third tier. On 28 July of the following year, he moved to fellow league team CE Sabadell FC, helping in their return to Segunda División after a five-year absence in 2020. He scored the winning goal in the promotion play-off final against FC Barcelona Atlètic in Marbella.

Querol made his professional debut at the age of 32 on 19 September 2020, coming on as a second-half substitute for goalscorer Juan Hernández in a 1–2 away loss against Rayo Vallecano.
