= Nagore (footballer) =

Spanish footballer

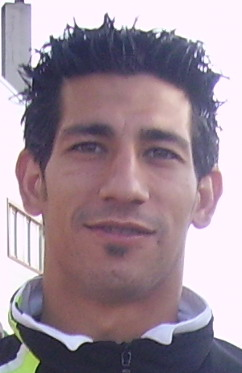

Personal information
- Full name: Alberto Gómez Fernández
- Date of birth: 27 December 1980 (age 45)
- Place of birth: Madrid, Spain
- Height: 1.82 m (6 ft 0 in)
- Position: Right-back

Youth career
- Atlético Madrid

Senior career*
Years	Team	Apps	(Gls)
1999–2000	Rayo Vallecano B		
2000–2001	Torrejón		
2001–2002	Gimnástico Alcázar		
2002–2003	Logroñés	28	(0)
2003	Toledo	15	(1)
2004	Atlético Pinto		
2004–2005	Peralta	33	(0)
2005–2007	Alicante	54	(1)
2007–2008	Girona	25	(0)
2008–2009	Lorca Deportiva	35	(3)
2009–2014	Alcorcón	142	(11)
2014	Levante	4	(0)
2014–2015	Alcorcón	31	(2)
2016–2018	Huesca	25	(2)
Total		392+	(20+)
- * Club domestic league appearances and goals

Alberto Gómez Fernández (born 27 December 1980), known as Nagore, is a Spanish former professional footballer who played as a right-back.

== Club career ==
Born in Madrid, Nagore spent until the age of nearly 30 in lower league football, rarely settling with a team as he only played more than one year with Alicante CF. In the 2009–10 season he contributed 38 games and one goal – playoffs included – as AD Alcorcón promoted to Segunda División for the first time in its history.

In the 2012–13 campaign Nagore, still an undisputed starter for the Community of Madrid side, only missed three matches in the regular season, totalled nearly 3,500 minutes of action and added four goals as they nearly achieved another promotion via the playoffs. Previously, on 30 June 2012, he renewed his contract for one year.

Nagore first reached La Liga aged 33, signing on 7 January 2014 for six months with Levante UD as a replacement for the departed Christian Lell. He made his debut two days later, playing the second half of a 0–0 away draw against Rayo Vallecano in the round of 16 of the Copa del Rey.

Nagore made his first appearance in the Spanish top flight on 9 February 2014, replacing injured Nikos Karabelas in the first half of an eventual 0–0 draw at Real Sociedad. Following his short spell, he returned to his previous club, signing a two-year deal on 10 July 2014.
