= José Martínez (footballer, born 1983) =

Spanish footballer (born 1983)

José
Personal information
- Full name: José Antonio Martínez Cervera
- Date of birth: 10 June 1983 (age 43)
- Place of birth: Barcelona, Spain
- Height: 1.75 m (5 ft 9 in)
- Position: Right-back

Youth career
- Damm
- Gironès-Sàbat

Senior career*
Years	Team	Apps	(Gls)
2003–2005	Peralada		
2005–2013	Girona	216	(2)
2013–2014	Omonia	13	(0)
2014–2015	Murcia	32	(0)
2015–2019	Olot	112	(3)
2020–2021	Palamós	5	(0)
Total		378	(5)
- * Club domestic league appearances and goals

José Antonio Martínez Cervera (born 10 June 1983), known simply as José, is a Spanish former professional footballer who played as a right-back.

== Club career ==
Born in Barcelona, Catalonia, José spent most of his career with Girona FC in his native region, representing the club in the second, third and fourth divisions of Spanish football. He appeared in 38 games in the 2012–13 season (including four in the playoffs), helping the team to fourth position in the second tier and scoring his only goal as a professional on 31 March 2013 in a 2–1 away loss against CD Numancia.

In summer 2013, the 30-year-old José moved abroad for the first time, signing with Cyprus' AC Omonia. He returned to his homeland at the end of one sole campaign in the First Division, going on to compete in the lower leagues until his retirement.

On 26 August 2017, in the second round of the third-tier season, José featured the entire 0–2 home defeat to CE Sabadell FC as a UE Olot player, with his brother Ángel coming on as a second-half substitute for the opposition. He resumed his career in the Catalan regional divisions after leaving in December 2019, with Palamós CF.

== Personal life ==
José's younger brother, Ángel, was also a footballer. Both shared teams in the 2010–11 season.
