= Antonio Romero (footballer, born 1995) =

Spanish footballer

Personal information
- Full name: Antonio Romero Boza
- Date of birth: 12 October 1995 (age 31)
- Place of birth: Mairena del Aljarafe, Spain
- Height: 1.72 m (5 ft 7 1/2 in)
- Position: Midfielder

Team information
- Current team: Dos Hermanas

Youth career
- 2003–2005: Atlético Libertad
- 2005–2008: Mairena
- 2008–2014: Sevilla

Senior career*
Years	Team	Apps	(Gls)
2014–2017	Sevilla B	63	(4)
2016–2017	→ Mérida (loan)	29	(4)
2017–2019	Mirandés	68	(2)
2019–2021	Sabadell	6	(0)
2021–2022	Costa Brava	35	(2)
2022–2023	Linense	34	(2)
2023–2024	Lleida Esportiu	11	(0)
2024	Linense	16	(0)
2024–2025	Manresa	32	(1)
2025–	Dos Hermanas	10	(1)
- * Club domestic league appearances and goals as of 9 November 2025

Antonio Romero Boza (born 12 October 1995) is a Spanish professional footballer who plays as a midfielder for Tercera Federación club Dos Hermanas.

== Club career ==
Born in Mairena del Aljarafe, Seville, Andalusia, Romero joined Sevilla FC's youth setup in 2008. He made his debut for the reserves on 24 August 2014, coming on as a second-half substitute in a 0–1 away loss against Arroyo CP.

Romero scored his first goal as a senior on 25 January 2015, netting the second in a 2–0 home win against UD Almería B. On 5 May 2016 he renewed his contract until 2018, and finished the campaign – which ended in promotion to Segunda División – with two goals in 28 appearances.

On 23 August 2016, Romero was loaned to third division side Mérida AD for one year. On 24 July of the following year, he moved to fellow league team CD Mirandés, helping in their promotion to the second division in 2019.

On 20 July 2019, Romero signed for CE Sabadell FC, still in division three, but suffered a serious knee injury in August which kept him out of the entire 2019–20 campaign, which ended in promotion. On 19 December 2019, he renewed his contract until 2021.

Romero made his professional debut on 19 September 2020, starting in a 1–2 away loss against Rayo Vallecano.
