= Mediterranean Technology Park =

Science park in Catalonia, Spain

Coordinates: 41.276°N 1.987°E

The Mediterranean Technology Park (PMT) is a science and technology park located in Castelldefels, a town in the Baix Llobregat county, in Catalonia, 10 minutes from the airport and 20 minutes from the centre of Barcelona.

== Overview ==
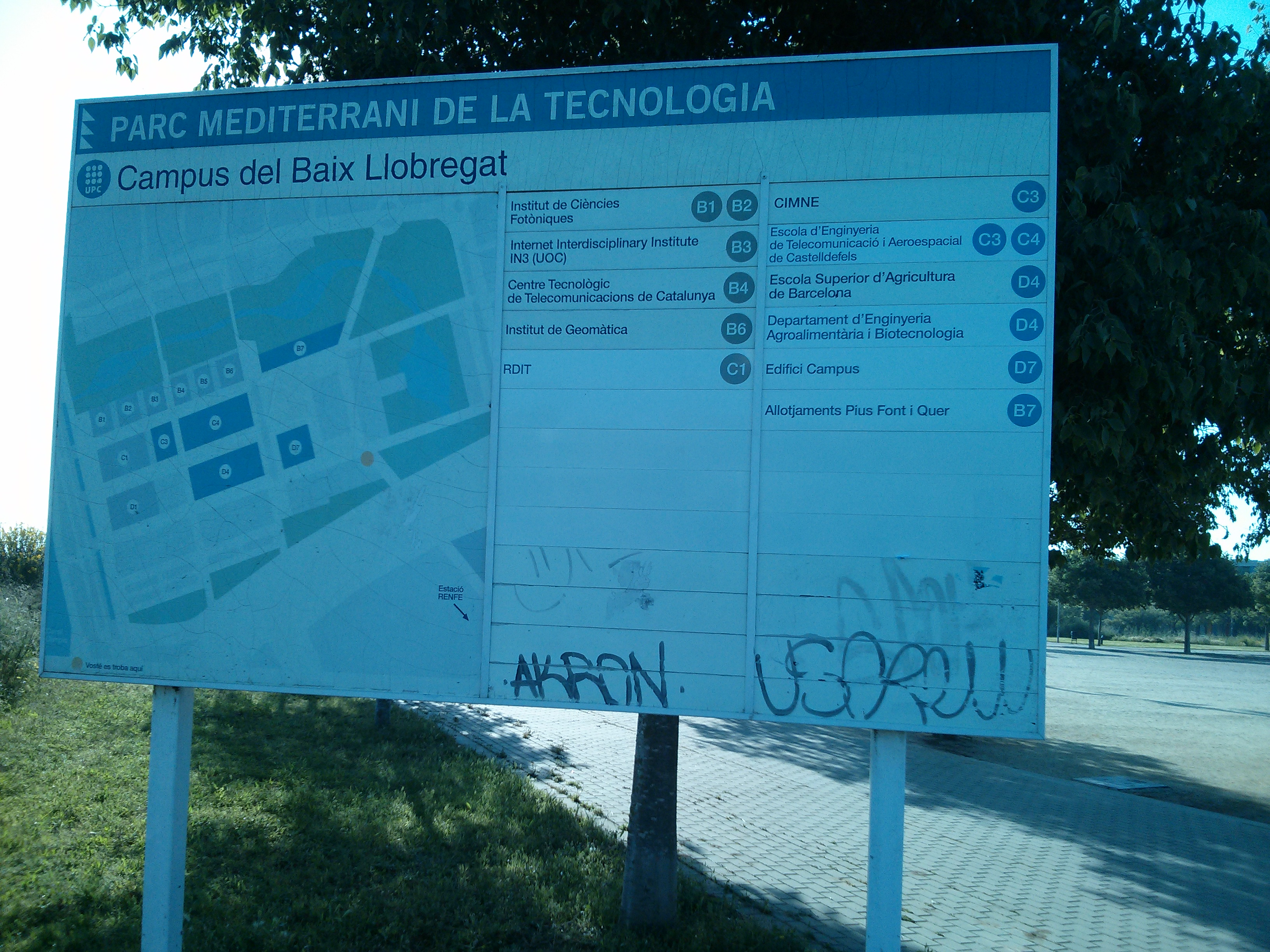
Parc Mediterrani de la Tecnologia in Castelldefels

The park is a joint initiative between:

- Castelldefels City Council
- Generalitat of Catalonia
- Regional Council of Baix Llobregat
- Technical University of Catalonia (UPC)

The PMT is a nerve centre for research and innovation that aims to create relations between:

- Companies with a high technology content
- Research centres
- Technology-based spin-off companies
- University schools (Baix Llobregat Campus of UPC)

The PMT is a multi-disciplinary environment that fosters the following fields:

- Aeronautics and Space Engineering
- Bioengineering, Agro-Food Engineering and Biotechnology
- Geo-Information Technologies
- Information and Communication Technologies
- Numerical Methods in Engineering
- Photonic Technologies

The MTP and Baix Llobregat Campus were opened for the 2001–2002 academic year. So far, 2 University schools, 20 research groups, 8 research centres, and 4 business initiatives involved in technological innovation have been located in the PMT

The PMT has a Technology incubator, a Documentation Centre and Library, Auditorium and meeting rooms and high quality infrastructures.

== Future ==
In 2009, it will open a university residence and the REDIT building (Research+ Development+ Technological Innovation), that will cover a total area of 10,000 m2 and will be suitable for the following activities:

- R&D activities carried out by multinationals or large-scale national companies
- Small and medium companies that carry out extensive R&D or innovation activities
- Groups that offer the following types of services: legal, fiscal, marketing, financing, quality control
- University research groups with competitive funding
- Public research centres promoted by the university and/or the Regional Government
- Joint projects between private companies and university groups or research centres
- Spin-off companies created by the university and public research centres
