= Gavà =

- Municipality
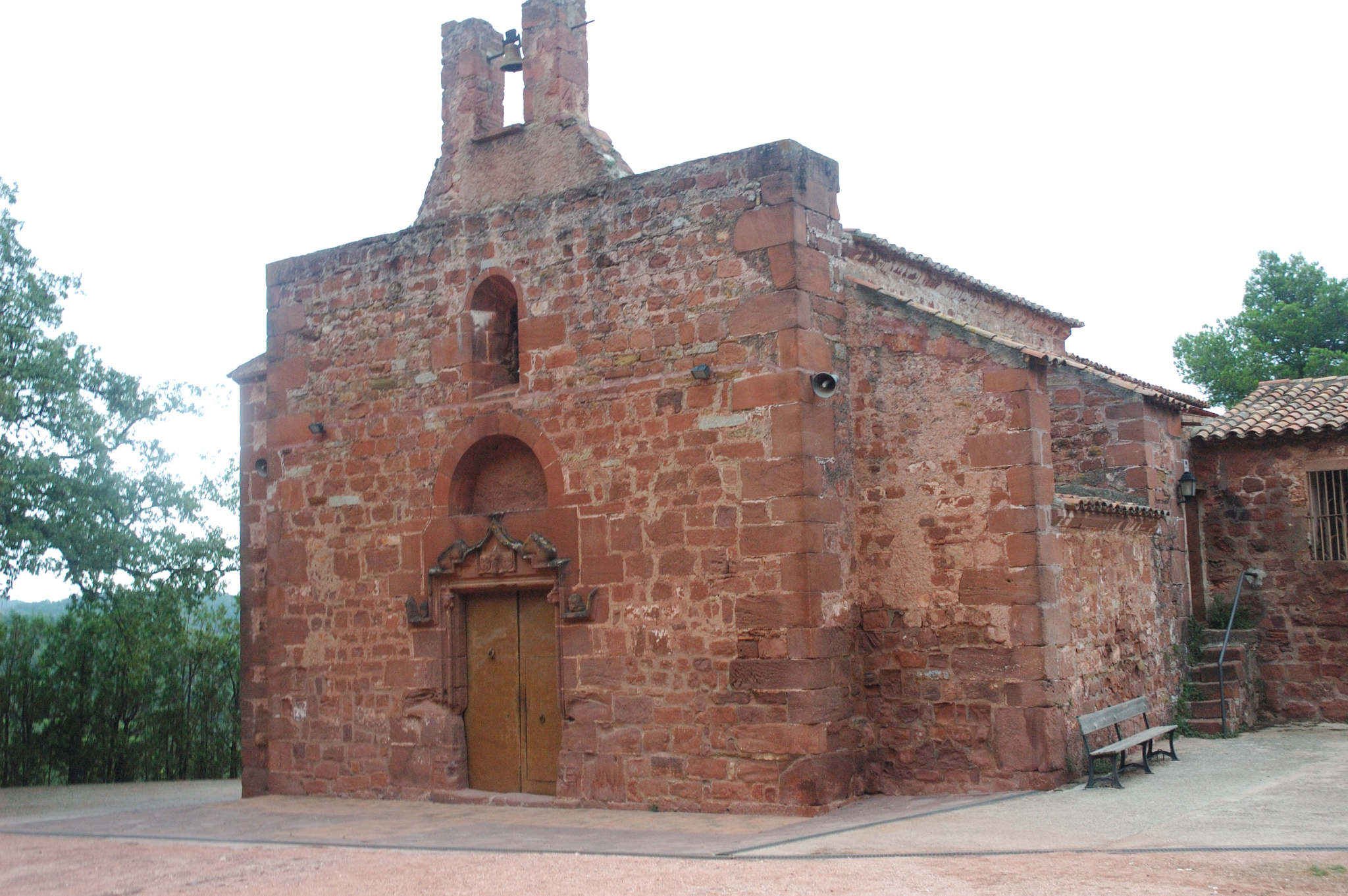
- Ermita de Bruguers

- Flag Coat of arms

- Location in Catalonia Gavà (Spain)
- Coordinates: 41°18′26″N 2°00′14″E
- Country: Spain
- Community: Catalonia
- Province: Barcelona
- Comarca: Baix Llobregat

Government
  - Mayor: Gemma Badia Cequier (2023)

Area
  - Total: 30.8 km^{2} (11.9 sq mi)
- Elevation: 9 m (30 ft)

Population (2025-01-01)
  - Total: 48,243
  - Density: 1,570/km^{2} (4,060/sq mi)
- Postal code: 08850
- Website: www.gavaciutat.cat

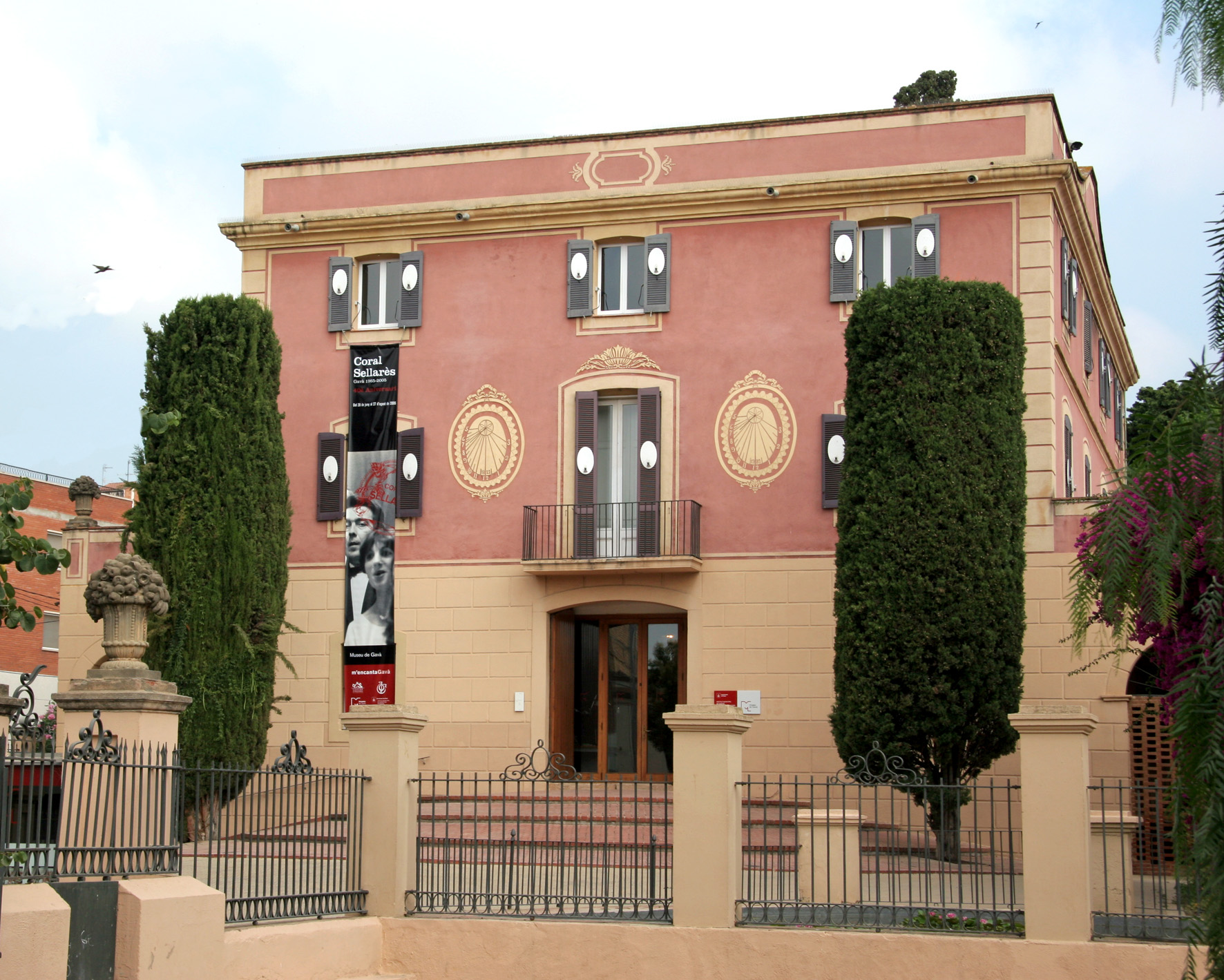
Gavà museum

Gavà (Catalan pronunciation: [ɡəˈβa]) is a municipality in the Baix Llobregat comarca, in the province of Barcelona in Catalonia, Spain. It borders the coast of the Mediterranean Sea between Viladecans and Castelldefels.

Gavà has a beach and two population centers: the city proper and Gavà Mar (Gavà Sea), a coastal neighborhood. Gavà's mayor belongs to the Socialists' Party of Catalonia.

== Education ==
The city has different Education centers:

- 2 public kindergarten of the Generalitat and 8 private
- 6 public schools of infant and primary education
- 2 institutes and 1 institute-school
- 5 private subsidized centers of infant, primary and secondary education

In the post-compulsory stage there are:

- 5 public or subsidized centers of batxillerat: Institut Bruguers, Institut El Calamot, Col·legi Santo Angel, Col·legi Immaculada Concepció and Col·legi Sagrada Família.
- 2 public or subsidized centers of professional training: Calamot and CEFP Núria.
- 2 private centers: Lycée Français de Gavà Bon Soleil, a French international school, and the British College of Gava.

== Demography ==
1900	1930	1950	1970	1986	2007
1825	5054	6860	24,213	32,351	44,678

== Sports ==
- CF Gavà (football)
