= Josu Ozkoidi =

Spanish footballer

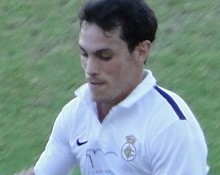

Personal information
- Full name: Josu Ozkoidi Alba
- Date of birth: 23 April 1990 (age 36)
- Place of birth: San Sebastián, Spain
- Height: 1.69 m (5 ft 7 in)
- Position: Left back

Youth career
- 1999–2004: Antiguoko
- 2004–2008: Real Sociedad

Senior career*
Years	Team	Apps	(Gls)
2008–2014	Real Sociedad B	168	(11)
2014–2015	Eibar	0	(0)
2014–2015	→ Real Unión (loan)	29	(1)
2015–2017	Real Unión	60	(8)
2017–2021	Sabadell	119	(2)
2021–2022	Amorebieta	16	(0)
2022–2023	Rayo Majadahonda	23	(1)
2024	Sestao River	4	(0)
- * Club domestic league appearances and goals as of 25 May 2024

Josu Ozkoidi Alba (born 23 April 1990) is a Spanish footballer who plays as a left back.

== Club career ==
Born in San Sebastián, Gipuzkoa, Basque Country, Ozkoidi was a Real Sociedad youth graduate. An attacking midfielder, he made his senior debut with the reserves during the 2008–09 season, suffering relegation from Segunda División B.

On 19 August 2014, Ozkoidi joined SD Eibar and was immediately loaned to Real Unión in the third division, for one year. On 31 August of the following year, he signed a permanent two-year contract with the Txuribeltz.

On 19 July 2017, Ozkoidi moved to CE Sabadell FC still in the third tier. At the club he was converted into a left back, and contributed with 26 appearances (play-offs included) during the 2019–20 campaign, as his side achieved promotion to Segunda División.

Ozkoidi made his professional debut at the age of 30 on 19 September 2020, coming on as a late substitute for Jaime Sánchez in a 1–2 away loss against Rayo Vallecano. He scored his first professional goal the following 16 April, netting the opener in a 2–2 draw at CF Fuenlabrada.

On 8 July 2021, after suffering relegation, Ozkoidi moved to SD Amorebieta.
