= Adri Cuevas =

Spanish footballer (born 1990)

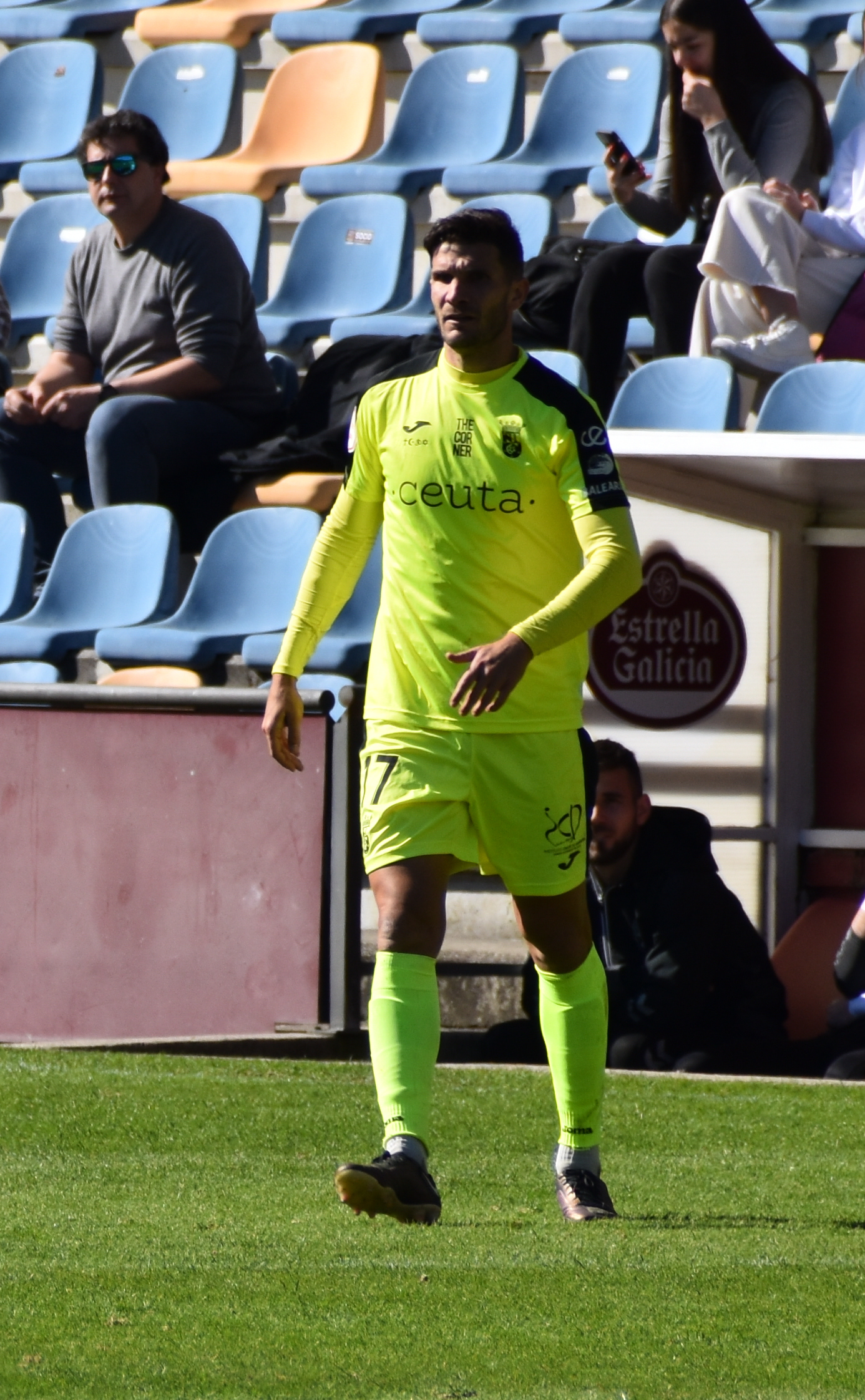

Personal information
- Full name: Adrián Cuevas Algeciras
- Date of birth: 10 January 1990 (age 36)
- Place of birth: Jerez de la Frontera, Spain
- Height: 1.87 m (6 ft 2 in)
- Position: Midfielder

Team information
- Current team: Portuense

Youth career
- Xerez

Senior career*
Years	Team	Apps	(Gls)
2007–2011	Xerez B	55	(9)
2010–2013	Xerez	0	(0)
2011–2012	→ Valencia B (loan)	20	(2)
2012–2013	→ San Fernando (loan)	36	(2)
2013–2015	Córdoba B	20	(1)
2014	→ Gimnàstic (loan)	14	(3)
2014–2015	→ Hércules (loan)	22	(5)
2015–2016	Hércules	16	(0)
2016	Celta B	14	(2)
2017	Villanovense	16	(0)
2017–2018	Ebro	37	(6)
2018–2021	Sabadell	96	(8)
2021–2022	Badajoz	29	(1)
2022–2024	Ceuta	31	(5)
2024–2025	Atlético Sanluqueño	23	(0)
2025–	Portuense	29	(2)
- * Club domestic league appearances and goals as of 13:09, 21 October 2026 (UTC)

Adrián 'Adri' Cuevas Algeciras (born 10 January 1990) is a Spanish footballer who plays as a midfielder for Tercera Federación club Racing Club Portuense.

== Club career ==
Born in Jerez de la Frontera, Province of Cádiz, Cuevas graduated from his local club Xerez CD's youth system, playing four full seasons with the reserve side. On 27 October 2010 he made his debut for the first team, starting against Levante UD in the round of 32 of the Copa del Rey.

After one more appearance with the main squad, again in the domestic cup and against the same opponent, Cuevas renewed his contract with the Andalusians, his new link running until 30 June 2014. After loan stints with Segunda División B teams Valencia CF Mestalla and San Fernando CD, he joined Córdoba CF B.

On 26 January 2014, Cuevas was loaned to Gimnàstic de Tarragona also in the third division. On 27 August, he moved to Hércules CF of the same league also in a temporary deal.

On 10 August 2015, Cuevas cut ties with Córdoba CF. In the following years, he continued competing in the third tier; the exception to this was the 2020–21 season, spent with CE Sabadell FC in division two.

Cuevas signed for Atlético Sanluqueño CF of Primera Federación in August 2024.
