= Xavi Boniquet =

Spanish footballer

Personal information
- Full name: Xavier Boniquet Rodríguez
- Date of birth: 29 May 1990 (age 36)
- Place of birth: Terrassa, Spain
- Height: 1.73 m (5 ft 8 in)
- Position: Winger

Youth career
- Terrassa

Senior career*
Years	Team	Apps	(Gls)
2009–2010	Osasuna B	9	(0)
2010–2013	Pobla Mafumet	78	(10)
2013	Sant Andreu	19	(3)
2013–2014	Badalona	35	(2)
2014–2015	Cornellà	36	(2)
2015–2016	Terrassa	35	(9)
2016–2018	Peralada	55	(9)
2018–2019	Badalona	27	(1)
2019–2022	Sabadell	86	(4)
2022–2023	UD Logroñés	30	(0)
- * Club domestic league appearances and goals as of 27 May 2024

Xavier "Xavi" Boniquet Rodríguez (born 29 May 1990) is a Spanish footballer who plays as a left winger.

== Club career ==
Born in Terrassa, Barcelona, Catalonia, Boniquet finished his formation with Terrassa FC. In July 2009, he moved to CA Osasuna and was assigned to the reserves in Segunda División B, and made his senior debut on 19 September of that year, playing the last 29 minutes in a 1–0 away win against Sestao River Club.

In July 2010, after appearing rarely, Boniquet moved to CF Pobla de Mafumet in Tercera División. On 16 January 2013, he agreed to a contract with UE Sant Andreu in the third division.

On 15 August 2015, after representing third tier sides CF Badalona and UE Cornellà, Boniquet returned to Terrassa, being assigned to the main squad in the fourth division. On 29 July of the following year, after scoring a career-best nine goals, he moved to CF Peralada, helping the side in their promotion to division three.

Boniquet returned to Badalona on 28 July 2018, but moved to fellow third division side CE Sabadell FC on 17 August of the following year. With the latter side he achieved promotion to Segunda División in his first season, and renewed his contract for a further year on 9 July 2020.

Boniquet made his professional debut at the age of 30 on 27 September 2020, coming on as a second-half substitute for Iker Undabarrena in a 0–1 away loss against RCD Mallorca.
