= Castelldefels =

- Municipality
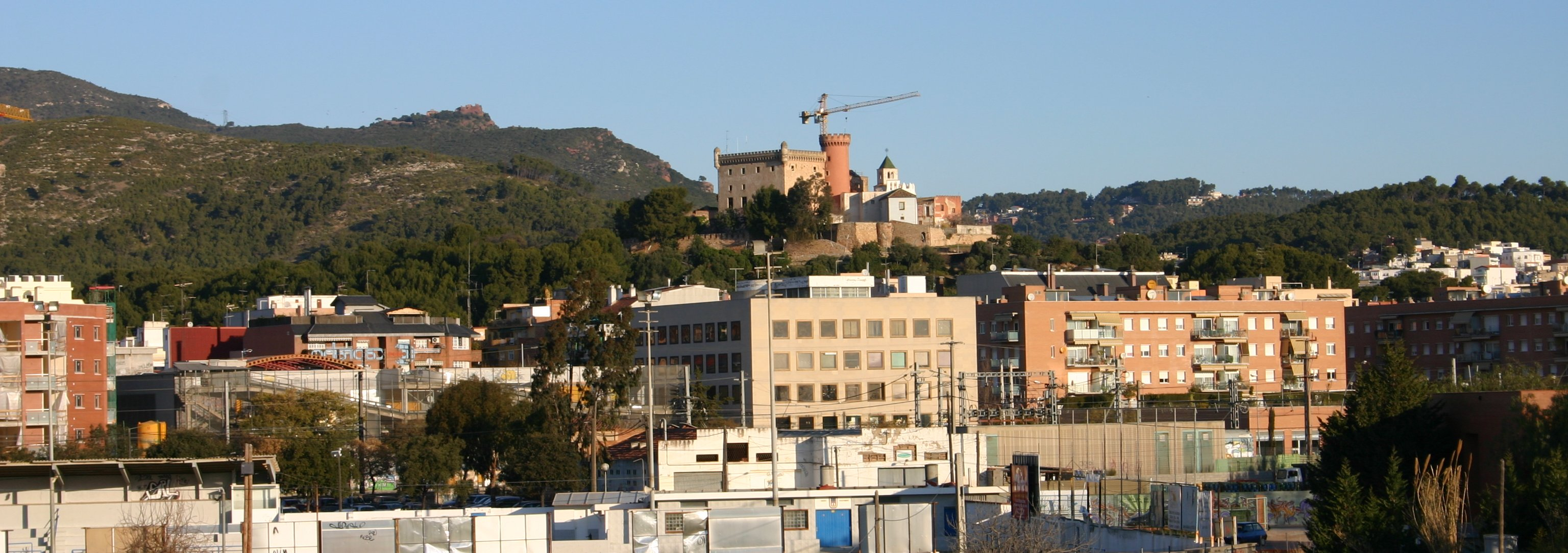
- Castelldefels

- Flag Coat of arms

- Location in the Province of Barcelona Location in Catalonia Location of Spain
- Coordinates: 41.286°N 1.982°E
- Country: Spain
- Autonomous community: Catalonia
- Province: Barcelona
- Comarca: Baix Llobregat

Government
  - Mayor: Manuel Reyes (2023–2027) (PP)

Area
  - Total: 12.9 km^{2} (5.0 sq mi)
- Elevation: 3 m (9.8 ft)

Population (2025-01-01)
  - Total: 70,057
  - Density: 5,430/km^{2} (14,100/sq mi)
- Demonym(s): castelldefelenc, castelldefelenca (Ca) castelldefelense, castelldefelensa (Es)
- Time zone: UTC+01:00 (CET)
  - Summer (DST): UTC+02:00 (CEST)
- Postal code: 08860
- Official language(s): Catalan and Spanish
- Website: castelldefels.cat

Castelldefels (Catalan pronunciation: [kəsˌteʎðəˈfɛls]) is a municipality in the Baix Llobregat comarca, in the province of Barcelona in Catalonia, Spain, and a suburban town of the Metropolitan Area of Barcelona. Its population is 65,954 (IDESCAT, 2017).

== Geography and location ==
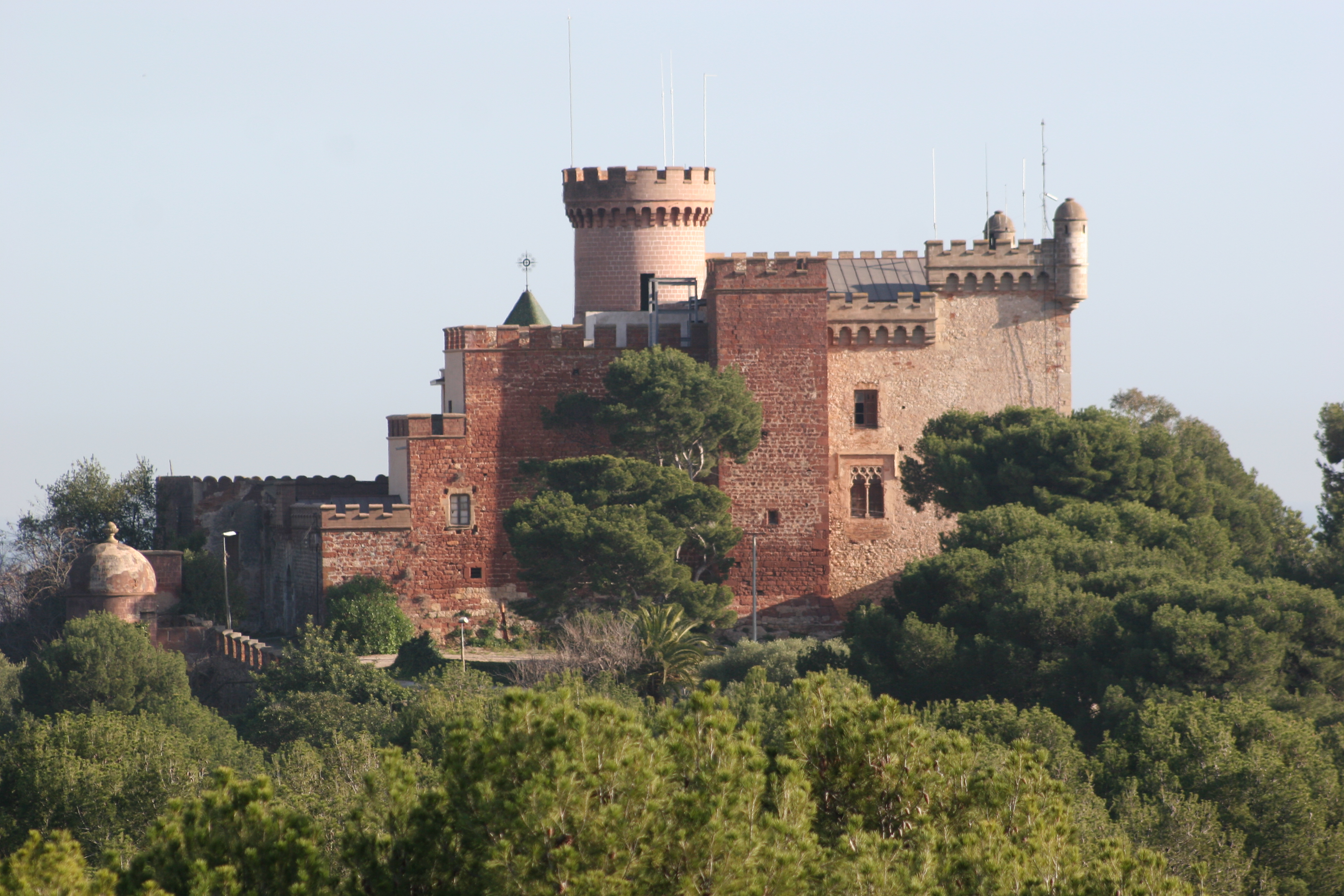
Castle of Castelldefels

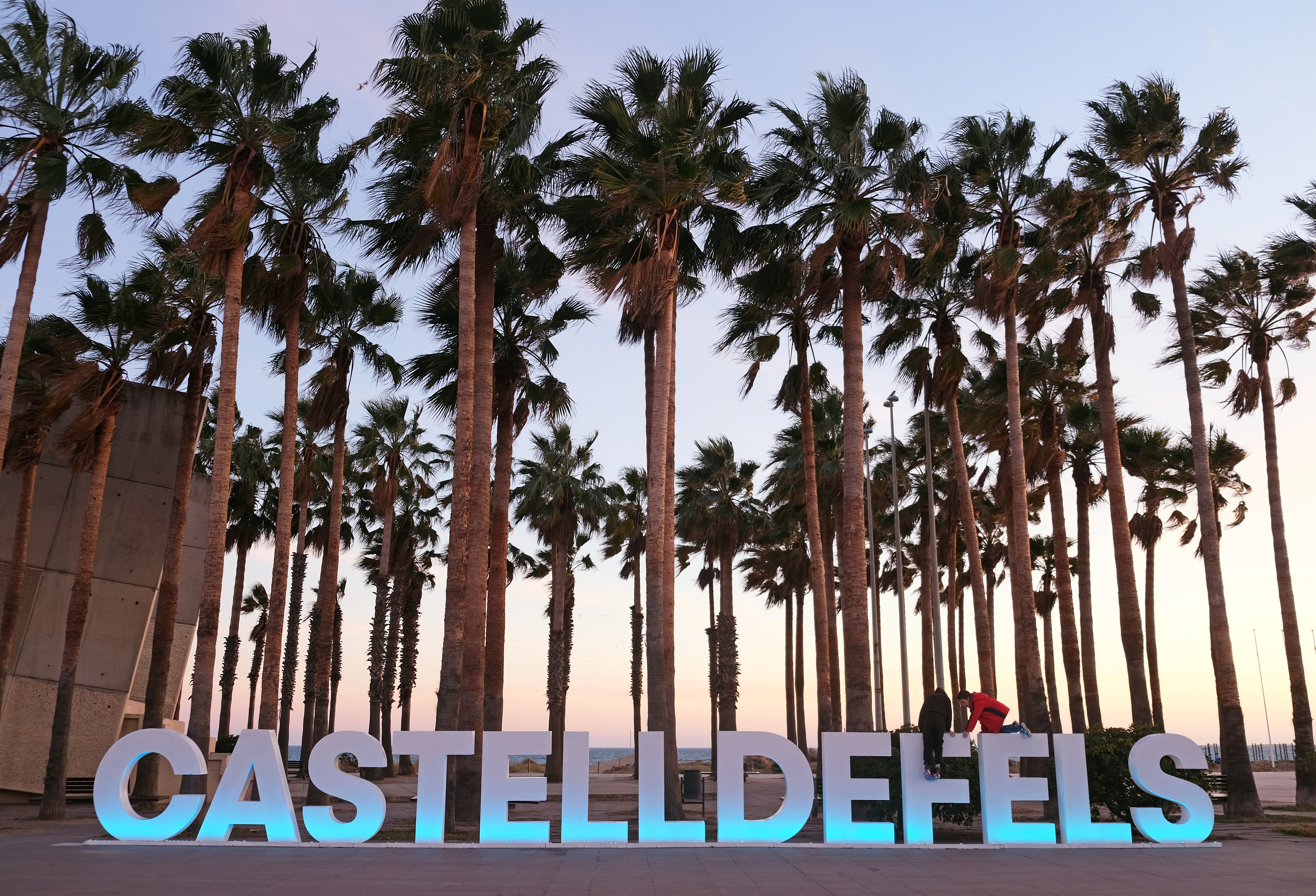
Castelldefels beach

It is located about 20 km (12 mi) southwest of Barcelona, 25 minutes south of Barcelona,just to the south of the massís del Garraf and is the last town on the coast before the comarca of Garraf. The town is famous for its long beach (more than 5 km) and well known for being an affluent area, as the place of residence of many famous sportsmen, such as Lionel Messi, Luis Suárez, Philippe Coutinho, or formerly Ronaldinho; and for being the city which inspired the creation of the character "El Neng de Castefa" who used to appear on the late night show called "BFN" hosted by the showman and presenter Andreu Buenafuente. During the summer, many people from Barcelona and the countryside visit it. Nearby towns include Gavà, Viladecans, Sant Boi de Llobregat, Sitges and el Prat de Llobregat. Castelldefels borders the coast of the Mediterranean Sea between Sitges and Gavà with a major beach. Castelldefels also enjoys close proximity to the major international airport of Barcelona, as El Prat Airport is about 15 km of a drive.

The Olympic canal, called Canal Olímpic de Catalunya, built for the 1992 Summer Olympic Games of Barcelona is in the town.

The main-belt asteroid 72037 Castelldefels, discovered in 2000, is named after the town.

== Demography and governance ==
Population
1900	1930	1950	1970	1986	2005
289	797	2039	13,219	27,932	56,718

Between 1979 and 2011, the town was governed by the Socialists' Party of Catalonia (PSC). The first democratic mayor after Constitution was Agustín Marina Pérez. In 2011, the conservative People's Party (PP) won a plurality of seats for the first time, and Manuel Reyes of the PP was elected mayor of the town. In 2015, the eco-socialist Candela López of the ICV was elected mayor by a leftist government coalition.

=== Summary of council election results ===
	1979	1983	1987	1991	1995	1999	2003	2007	2011	2015	2019	2023
Socialists' Party of Catalonia (PSC)	8	15	12	11	9	9	8	9	7	4	6	4
Initiative for Catalonia Greens (ICV)	5 ^{(a)}		2		3	1	2	3	3			
United and Alternative Left (EUiA)	5 ^{(a)}	1 ^{(b)}	2	1 ^{(b)}	3	1	2	3	3			
Movem Castelldefels (with ICV-EUiA)										4	4	3
Union of the Democratic Centre (UCD)	4											
Independents/Residents groups	2					1	2	2	2			
Convergence and Union (CiU)	1	3	5	6	4	4	3	4	5	2		
Together for Castelldefels (Junts)											1	1
Republican Left of Catalonia (ERC)	1						1	1		3	4	2
People's Party (PP)		2 ^{(c)}	1 ^{(c)}	3	5	5	5	5	8	8	8	12
Democratic and Social Centre (CDS)			1									
Citizens – Party of the Citizenry (C's)								1		2	2	
Castelldefels Si Pot (CSPOT)										2		
Som Castelldefels (SFELS)												3
Total number of seats	21	21	21	21	21	21	21	25	25	25	25	25

^{(a)} results for the Unified Socialist Party of Catalonia
^{(b)} results for the Party of the Communists of Catalonia
^{(c)} results for the People's Alliance

== Education ==
Castelldefels School of Technology provides higher education in aeronautics and telecommunications technology.

The town is also the location of the Castelldefels and Nexus (sixth form college) campuses of the British School of Barcelona (BSB).

There are ten public primary schools and three public secondary schools.

== Transport ==
Transport links include two stations (Castelldefels and Platja de Castelldefels) on Renfe line R2 from Sant Vicenç de Calders to Maçanet-Massanes via Barcelona, bus routes to Barcelona (L94, L95, L97), Barcelona Airport (L99) and Sant Boi de Llobregat (L96), as well as an urban bus route connecting the rest of the town (CF1), the C-32 motorway and the C-31 and C-245 dual carriageways. A second railway line is due to be constructed from Cornellà de Llobregat to Castelldefels.

=== 2010 accident ===
On 23 June 2010, 12 young people were killed, and 14 injured, when they were hit by an express train as they crossed the tracks in the railway station at Platja de Castelldefels, while on their way to a summer solstice bonfire party on the beach.
