= Juan Hernández (footballer, born 1994) =

Spanish footballer

Personal information
- Full name: Juan Hernández García
- Date of birth: 6 December 1994 (age 31)
- Place of birth: Lorca, Spain
- Height: 1.77 m (5 ft 10 in)
- Positions: Winger; forward

Team information
- Current team: Lorca Deportiva
- Number: 7

Youth career
- La Hoya Lorca
- 2012–2013: Granada

Senior career*
Years	Team	Apps	(Gls)
2012	La Hoya Lorca	2	(0)
2013–2015	Granada B	0	(0)
2013–2014	→ La Hoya Lorca B (loan)	?	(10)
2013–2015	→ La Hoya Lorca (loan)	29	(0)
2015–2016	Getafe B	31	(7)
2016–2018	Celta B	65	(23)
2018–2021	Celta	5	(0)
2018–2019	→ Cádiz (loan)	2	(0)
2020–2021	→ Sabadell (loan)	32	(5)
2021–2022	Alcorcón	23	(3)
2022	Ponferradina	16	(0)
2022–2023	Burgos	24	(0)
2023–2025	Málaga	20	(1)
2024–2025	→ Algeciras (loan)	21	(1)
2025–	Lorca Deportiva	18	(1)
- * Club domestic league appearances and goals as of 15 May 2026

Juan Hernández García (born 6 December 1994) is a Spanish professional footballer who plays as either a right winger or a forward for Segunda Federación club Lorca Deportiva.

== Club career ==
Hernández was born in Lorca, Murcia, and is a La Hoya Lorca CF youth graduate. He made his senior debut for the club during the 2011–12 campaign, in Tercera División, while still a youth player.

In 2012, Hernández joined Granada CF, returning to youth football. On 16 July of the following year, he returned to La Hoya Lorca on loan, with his side now in Segunda División B.

On 8 June 2015, Hernández signed for Getafe CF, being immediately assigned to the reserves in the third tier. On 14 July of the following year he moved to another reserve team, Celta de Vigo B still in the third division.

On 4 July 2017, Hernández renewed his contract with Celta for a further season, with an option for three more. He scored a career-best 14 goals during the campaign, as his side reached the play-offs, and was subsequently promoted to the first team in La Liga.

On 7 August 2018, Hernández was loaned to Segunda División side Cádiz CF for one season. He made his professional debut on 17 August, coming on as a second-half substitute for Manu Vallejo in a 1–0 home win against UD Almería.

On 4 September 2018, Hernández suffered a serious knee injury, sidelining him for the remainder of the season. Upon returning to Celta, he was assigned to the main squad, and made his top tier debut on 15 December 2019 by replacing fellow youth graduate Kevin in a 2–2 home draw against RCD Mallorca.

On 27 August 2020, Hernández renewed his contract with Celta until 2022, being immediately loaned to second division newcomers CE Sabadell FC for the season. On 7 July of the following year, he agreed to a two-year deal with fellow second level side AD Alcorcón, after cutting ties with the Galicians.

Despite being regularly used at Alkor, Hernández terminated his contract on 26 January 2022, and moved to fellow second division side SD Ponferradina two days later. On 1 September, he signed a 1+1 deal with Burgos CF of the same category.

On 3 August 2023, Hernández agreed to a three-year contract with Málaga CF, recently relegated to Primera Federación. On 29 August 2024, after helping the club to return to the second division at first attempt, he was loaned to Algeciras CF for one year.

Upon returning, Hernández terminated his link with Málaga on 15 July 2025.
