= 2012–13 Blackpool F.C. season =

English football club season

Blackpool F.C.
2012–13 season
- Owner: Owen Oyston
- Chairman: Karl Oyston
- Manager: Ian Holloway (until 3 November); Steve Thompson (caretaker) (3 November – 7 November & 11 January – 18 February); Michael Appleton (7 November – 11 January); Paul Ince (18 February)
- Stadium: Bloomfield Road; Blackpool, England (Capacity: 17,338)
- Football League Championship: 15th
- FA Cup: Round Three^{1}
- League Cup: Round One
- Top goalscorer: League: Tom Ince (18); All: Tom Ince (18)
Home colours	Away colours

The 2012–13 season was Blackpool F.C.'s second-consecutive season in the Football League Championship, the second tier of English professional football, and their 104th overall season in the Football League. They finished in 15th position. Tom Ince was the club's top scorer, with eighteen goals in all competitions.

Ian Holloway, in his fourth season, was manager until 3 November. He left to join Crystal Palace, at which point his assistant, Steve Thompson, took over in a caretaker capacity. On 7 November, after a second game in charge for Thompson, Blackpool appointed Michael Appleton in the role in a permanent capacity, on a one-year rolling contract. He became Blackpool's thirtieth full-time manager. Appleton, in turn, left the club for Blackburn Rovers on 11 January. Steve Thompson again took over as caretaker. One month and one week later, Paul Ince was appointed manager, again on a rolling contract.

== Season summary ==
=== Pre-season ===
Over the summer, the club released five players: forwards Lomana LuaLua, Daniel Bogdanović, Roman Bednář and Brett Ormerod, and defender Matt Hill. In addition, four loan players returned to their parent clubs: defender Danny Wilson, midfielder John Fleck, and forwards Nouha Dicko and Stephen Dobbie. Elliot Grandin, however, returned from an extended loan to Nice in his native France.

Blackpool made right-back Jake Caprice their first signing on 9 July. He arrived on a free transfer from Crystal Palace.

On 20 July, midfielder Isaiah Osbourne joined from Hibernian for a fee of £250,000.

Five days later, Portuguese midfielder Tiago Gomes was signed on a free transfer.

The following day, midfielder Keith Southern, the club's longest-serving current player, was sold to Huddersfield Town for £300,000, reuniting with his former manager at Blackpool, Simon Grayson. A testimonial match in honour of Southern's ten years of service to the Tangerines took place on 5 August. Everton were the visitors to Bloomfield Road, and Southern played the first fifteen minutes and the last fifteen minutes of the tie. The hosts won 2–0.

On 27 July, Ian Holloway made his fourth signing in Dundee United's 27-year-old Scotland international midfielder Scott Robertson. He arrived on a free transfer, and became the eighth Scot in the Blackpool squad.

As of 28 July, Ian Holloway had a first-team squad of 34 at his disposal. This included the four former Youth players who were handed professional contracts. They were forward Alex Addai, defender Matt Challoner, and midfielders Jamie Menagh and Curtis Thompson. While the squad were at their pre-season training camp in Portugal, Craig Sutherland suffered a knee injury that will put him out of action for twelve months.

The first of Blackpool's three pre-season friendlies took place at Wrexham, managed by former 'Pool striker Andy Morrell, on 28 July. Goals from Kevin Phillips and new signing Scott Robertson gave the visitors a 2–1 victory. Recent departure Brett Ormerod started for Wrexham, while Morrell came on as a second-half substitute after being urged on by the visiting support.

=== Season proper ===
On 18 June, the Football League fixtures were published. Blackpool had four Lancashire-derby fixtures this campaign, with Blackburn Rovers having been relegated from the Premier League last season. They joined Burnley as Blackpool's rivals in the Red Rose County.

Blackpool officially kicked off their season on 12 August, with a League Cup first-round fixture against Morecambe at Bloomfield Road. The first-ever competitive meeting between the two Fylde Coast clubs ended with victory for the visitors. The Shrimps took the lead inside six minutes via Lewis Alessandra. Andrew Fleming doubled their lead eleven minutes into the second half. Alex Baptiste scored what proved to be a consolation for the hosts with thirteen minutes remaining.

On 14 August, Blackpool completed a trio of signings. Danish-Algerian striker Adda Djeziri, who had played under Ian Holloway at Leicester City, joined from Viborg. Spaniard Alberto Noguera, a midfielder, signed from Atlético Madrid, while fellow midfielder, Englishman James Caton, also put pen to paper. All three had been on trial with the club.

On the eve of their first League game of the season, striker Nouha Dicko re-joined the club on a season-long loan from Wigan Athletic, thus making the first-team squad total 38.

The following day, a 2–0 victory at Millwall put Blackpool joint-top of the table with Burnley.

Blackpool maintained their 100% start to the League campaign with a 2–1 win at home to Leeds United. Tom Lees put the visitors ahead in the 16th minute. The score remained the same until fifteen minutes from time, when Nouha Dicko opened his account for the season. Substitute Matt Phillips, reinstated to the matchday squad after submitting a transfer request at the weekend, netted the winner five minutes later. The win kept the Seasiders top of the table, two points clear of Sheffield Wednesday.

On 23 August, Ivorian forward Anderson Banvo and Frenchman Brice Irie-Bi joined the club on one-year contracts. They will start out in the Seasiders' development squad.

They made it three wins out of three with a 6–0 whitewash of Ipswich Town four days later.

On 31 August, transfer-deadline day, Blackpool signed Nathan Eccleston from Liverpool for an undisclosed fee and Nathan Delfouneso from Aston Villa on a season-long loan.

Blackpool's 100% start to the League campaign was ended on 1 September, with a single-goal defeat at Ian Holloway's former club Leicester City — a disputed penalty the difference. Blackpool remained top despite the defeat, however.

On 4 September, former Rangers defender Kirk Broadfoot joined the club on a free transfer, becoming the ninth Scot at Ian Holloway's disposal.

After a two-week break due to internationals, Blackpool travelled to Barnsley on 15 September. They came away with a draw — Tom Ince scoring his fifth goal in as many League games — and were knocked off the top of the table by Blackburn Rovers. Nathan Delfouneso became the 22nd player used by Ian Holloway in the club's five games thus far.

Three days later, the Seasiders hosted Middlesbrough at Bloomfield Road. A double from Nathan Delfouneso, on his full debut, inside 40 minutes put Blackpool into the driving seat. Andre Bikey pulled one back on the stroke of half-time. Tom Ince made it 3–1 ten minutes into the second half, in the process making himself the division's leading scorer, with six goals. Elliot Grandin made it 4–1 from the penalty spot after he was fouled. The win kept Blackpool in second place, behind Blackburn Rovers, in what was their best start to a League season in 57 years.

Two successive defeats ensued – 3–1 at home to Huddersfield Town, managed by former Blackpool boss Simon Grayson, and 3–0 at Cardiff City.

A victory, at Hull City on 2 October, followed, but a third defeat in four games occurred at home to Charlton Athletic. After that result, Blackpool lay in eighth position, six points behind leaders Cardiff City.

Four days later, Charlton Athletic dealt Blackpool their second-consecutive home defeat.

A fourth loss in five outings occurred two weeks later, after an international break. It was a Lancashire derby against Burnley at Turf Moor. Charlie Austin netted the only goal of the game inside twenty minutes.

Two successive home draws followed — against Nottingham Forest on 23 October and against Brighton & Hove Albion four days later.

Ian Holloway resigned as manager on the morning of 3 November, a match day at Derby County, to become the new manager of Crystal Palace. Assistant manager Steve Thompson took charge in a caretaker capacity for the fixture, but Holloway's team selection stuck. Blackpool lost 4–1, their sixth defeat of their fourteen League games.

Thompson remained in charge for the following game, in which Blackpool balanced their win–loss record with a 2–0 victory at Sheffield Wednesday.

Portsmouth manager Michael Appleton was named as Holloway's successor on 7 November. His first game in charge was at home to Bolton Wanderers three days later. The match finished 2–2.

A week later, Blackpool travelled to Bristol City and came home with a point after a 1–1 draw. A Tom Ince penalty — his tenth goal of the campaign — in the closing seconds of the game kept Appleton's unbeaten start intact. Blackpool climbed to 12th place in the table with the result.

A third-successive draw followed, at home to Watford on 24 November. The Hornets went two goals ahead before the half-hour mark, but the hosts fought back to take a point with second-half strikes from Kevin Phillips and, in the final seconds of the game, Isaiah Osbourne.

Three days later, Blackpool hosted Birmingham City. Tom Ince opened the scoring on 17 minutes, but Curtis Davies put City level three minutes into the second half. Blackpool sat sixteenth with the point.

Into December, and Michael Appleton notched his first win with a 4–1 scoreline at Peterborough United. Wes Thomas, on loan from Bournemouth, put the visitors ahead on 51 minutes with his first goal for the Tangerines. Seven minutes later, Tom Ince doubled Blackpool's lead from the penalty spot. Dwight Gayle pulled one back for the Posh on 71 minutes, but Nouha Dicko restored Blackpool's two-goal cushion ten minutes later. Two minutes from time, Ince scored his second and Blackpool's fourth. The win lifted Blackpool to eleventh.

On 8 December, Blackpool travelled to Ian Holloway's Crystal Palace. Nathan Delfouneso gave Blackpool the lead on 37 minutes. Owen Garvan equalised seven minutes in the second half. Glenn Murray put Palace ahead for the first time just after the hour mark, but substitute Nouha Dicko scored in the final minute to maintain Michael Appleton's unbeaten start to his Blackpool career.

On 15 December, Blackpool faced Blackburn Rovers at Bloomfield Road. Wes Thomas scored his second goal of the season on 22 minutes. Kirk Broadfoot opened his scoring account for Blackpool with an 81st-minute header to give Blackpool the three points and extend their unbeaten run to eight.

Wolves visited the seaside on 21 December, and came out the victors 2–1 in what was the halfway point of the campaign. Captain Alex Baptiste was Blackpool's scorer.

Blackpool crossed the Pennines on Boxing Day to face Huddersfield Town. The spoils were shared in a 1–1 draw, Nathan Delfouneso scoring for the visitors.

For their last fixture of 2012, Blackpool travelled north-east to take on Middlesbrough. They lost 4–2, with Wes Thomas and Chris Basham getting their goals.

New Year's Day saw Hull City switch coasts. They returned to Yorkshire with a point after a goalless draw.

On 11 January, after just two months in charge of the Seasiders, Michael Appleton quit to take over at Blackburn Rovers, leaving Karl Oyston the task of looking for a new manager for the second time this season.

Steve Thompson was again put in temporary charge for the trip to Charlton Athletic the following day. The Tangerines lost 2–1, with Nathan Eccleston netting his first Blackpool goal.

A week later, eventual champions Cardiff City travelled up the coast, looking to complete a double over Blackpool. They succeeded, with a 2–1 scoreline. gary Taylor-Fletcher scored the hosts' goal. Blackpool had now gone six games without a victory.

This was remedied on 26 January with a victory at Wolves. Tom Ince scored both Blackpool goals in the 2–1 scoreline.

Another defeat followed, however — this time at home to Barnsley, who went on to finish bottom of the table. Ince scored Blackpool's goal.

On 9 February, Blackpool beat Millwall 2–1 at Bloomfield Road. Ince, with his fourth goal in three games, and Nathan Delfouneso did the damage for Blackpool.

A long trip to Ipswich Town on 16 February proved fruitless, the Seasiders going down by a single goal.

Paul Ince was named as Michael Appleton's successor on 18 February, and his first match in charge was at Leeds United two days later. They lost 2–0.

Two goalless home draws followed — against Leicester City and Bristol City — leaving Blackpool without a goal to their name in 360 minutes of football.

Another draw, this time 1–1, at Birmingham City occurred on 5 March. Kirk Broadfoot opened his scoring account for Blackpool.

Paul Ince's first victory came on 9 March, at Watford, thanks to goals from Ince junior and Gary MacKenzie.

This was cancelled out, however, with a defeat the following week, at home to Peterborough United, another side relegated at the end of the campaign.

Blackpool made the short trip to Blackburn Rovers on 29 March. They would have expected to face former manager Michael Appleton, but he was relieved of his duties the previous week after 67 days in charge. The match finished 1–1. Gary MacKenzie found the net for the second-successive game.

They did face a former manager in the next game, when Ian Holloway brought his Crystal Palace side to Bloomfield Road. Despite having Barry Ferguson sent off just before half time, Matt Phillips' goal was enough to give the hosts a valuable three points.

A visit to Nottingham Forest on 6 April resulted in a point from a 1–1 draw. Ludovic Sylvestre scored for the Seasiders.

Local rivals Burnley visited the seaside on 13 April. Blackpool exacted revenge for the defeat at Turf Moor in the reverse fixture with a single-goal victory. Ludovic Sylvestre scored the goal.

A third clean sheet in four games followed with a goalless draw at home to Sheffield Wednesday.

Blackpool travelled to the south coast to face Brighton on 20 April, and they suffered their heaviest defeat in recent memory after Gus Poyet's men ran out 6–1 winners. The hosts scored all seven goals: Hammond put through his own goal.

Paul Ince got his fourth win the following week with a 2–1 scoreline against Derby County. Gary Taylor-Fletcher and Ludovic Sylvestre were on the mark for the hosts.

Blackpool's season was brought to a close with a 2–2 draw at Bolton Wanderers on 4 May. They led 2–0 before Bolton struck twice just before half time to level matters. Matt Phillips scored Blackpool's first, before Ludovic Sylvestre, with his fourth goal in six games, doubled the lead. The draw resulted in Wanderers' dropping out of the play-off zone in favour of Leicester City.

== Results ==
=== Pre-season ===
28 July 2012 Friendly	Wrexham	1–2	Blackpool	Wrexham, Wales
15:00		Report	K. Phillips; Robertson	Stadium: Racecourse Ground

4 August 2012 Friendly	Hyde	1–1	Blackpool	Hyde, England
15:00 BST	Spencer 58'	Report	M. Phillips 60'	Stadium: Ewen Fields

5 August 2012 Keith Southern; Testimonial	Blackpool	2–0	Everton	Blackpool, England
15:00 BST	Baptiste 63'; Caton 90'			Stadium: Bloomfield Road; Attendance: 9,208

7 August 2012 Friendly	Swansea City	4–2	Blackpool	Swansea, Wales
19:00 BST	Graham 1', 45', 67'; Michu 16'		Sylvestre 24'; Ince 87' (pen.)	Stadium: Liberty Stadium; Attendance: 8,631

=== The Championship ===
==== League table ====
Pos	Team	Pld	W	D	L	GF	GA	GD	Pts
13	Leeds United	46	17	10	19	57	66	−9	61
14	Ipswich Town	46	16	12	18	48	61	−13	60
15	Blackpool	46	14	17	15	62	63	−1	59
16	Middlesbrough	46	18	5	23	61	70	−9	59
17	Blackburn Rovers	46	14	16	16	55	62	−7	58

Updated to match(es) played on 4 May 2013. Source: BBC Sport
Rules for classification: 1) points; 2) goal difference; 3) number of goals scored.

==== Results summary ====
Overall								Home						Away					
Pld	W	D	L	GF	GA	GD	Pts	W	D	L	GF	GA	GD	W	D	L	GF	GA	GD
46	14	17	15	62	63	−1	59	8	9	6	32	24	+8	6	8	9	30	39	−9

Last updated: 4 May 2013.

==== Result round by round ====
Round	1	2	3	4	5	6	7	8	9	10	11	12	13	14	15	16	17	18	19	20	21	22	23	24	25	26	27	28	29	30	31	32	33	34	35	36	37	38	39	40	41	42	43	44	45	46
Ground	A	H	H	A	A	H	H	A	A	H	A	H	H	A	A	H	A	H	H	A	A	H	H	A	A	H	A	H	A	H	H	A	A	H	H	A	A	H	A	H	A	H	H	A	H	A
Result	W	W	W	L	D	W	L	L	W	L	L	D	D	L	W	D	D	D	D	W	D	W	L	D	L	D	L	L	W	L	W	L	L	D	D	D	W	L	D	W	D	W	D	L	W	D
Position	1	1	1	1	2	2	4	7	4	8	12	11	12	16	12	14	12	14	16	11	11	11	11	11	12	14	15	15	14	15	14	14	15	17	16	17	13	17	15	15	17	12	14	16	15	15

Updated to match(es) played on 4 May 2013. Source:
A = Away; H = Home; W = Win; D = Draw; L = Loss

18 August 2012 1	Millwall	0–2	Blackpool	London, England
15:00 BST		Report	Ince 32', 60'	Stadium: The Den; Attendance: 11,010; Referee: Langford

21 August 2012 2	Blackpool	2–1	Leeds United	Blackpool, England
20:00	Dicko 75'; M. Phillips 80'	Report	Lees 16'	Stadium: Bloomfield Road; Attendance: 14,315; Referee: Whitestone

25 August 2012 3	Blackpool	6–0	Ipswich Town	Blackpool, England
15:00	Cresswell 13' (o.g.); Taylor-Fletcher 45'; Ince 49', 58'; Cathcart 62'; Dicko 90'	Report		Stadium: Bloomfield Road; Attendance: 14,266; Referee: Miller

1 September 2012 4	Leicester City	1–0	Blackpool	Leicester, England
17:20	Marshall 54' (pen.)	Report		Stadium: King Power Stadium; Attendance: 18,655; Referee: Michael Jones

15 September 2012 5	Barnsley	1–1	Blackpool	Barnsley, England
15:00	Davies 14'	Report	Ince 30'	Stadium: Oakwell Stadium; Attendance: 14,134; Referee: Woolmer

18 September 2012 6	Blackpool	4–1	Middlesbrough	Blackpool, England
20:00	Delfouneso 10', 36'; Ince 56'; Grandin 86' (pen.)	Report	Bikey 45'	Stadium: Bloomfield Road; Attendance: 12,746; Referee: Madley

24 September 2012 7	Blackpool	1–3	Huddersfield Town	Blackpool, England
19:45	Taylor-Fletcher 27'	Report	Novak 13'; Vaughan 45'; Norwood 48'	Stadium: Bloomfield Road; Attendance: 13,886; Referee: Anthony Bates

29 September 2012 8	Cardiff City	3–0	Blackpool	Cardiff, Wales
15:00		Report		Stadium: Cardiff City Stadium; Attendance: 21,216; Referee: Boyeson

2 October 2012 9	Hull City	2–3	Blackpool	Hull, England
19:45		Report	M. Phillips 11'; K. Phillips 71'; Dicko 83'	Stadium: KC Stadium; Attendance: 14,919; Referee: Mathieson

6 October 2012 10	Blackpool	0–2	Charlton Athletic	Blackpool, England
15:00		Report		Stadium: Bloomfield Road; Attendance: 13,482; Referee: Eltringham

20 October 2012 11	Burnley	1–0	Blackpool	Burnley, England
17:20	Austin 19'	Report		Stadium: Turf Moor; Attendance: 12,925; Referee: Oliver

23 October 2012 12	Blackpool	2–2	Nottingham Forest	Blackpool, England
20:00	Grandin 70'; Taylor-Fletcher 75'	Report	Sharp 25'; Blackstock 90'	Stadium: Bloomfield Road

27 October 2012 13	Blackpool	1–1	Brighton	Blackpool, England
15:00	Grandin 72'	Report	Barnes 56'	Stadium: Bloomfield Road

3 November 2012 14	Derby County	4–1	Blackpool	Derby, England
15:00		Report	Ince (pen.)	Stadium: Pride Park; Attendance: 22,272; Referee: Russell

6 November 2012 15	Sheffield Wednesday	0–2	Blackpool	Sheffield, England
19:30		Report	Ince; Sylvestre	Stadium: Hillsborough; Attendance: 19,978; Referee: D'Urso

10 November 2012 16	Blackpool	2–2	Bolton Wanderers	Blackpool, England
15:00	Ince; Delfouneso	Report		Stadium: Bloomfield Road; Attendance: 15,525; Referee: Moss

17 November 2012 17	Bristol City	1–1	Blackpool	Bristol, England
15:00		Report	Ince (pen.)	Stadium: Ashton Gate; Attendance: 12,009; Referee: Ward

24 November 2012 18	Blackpool	2–2	Watford	Blackpool, England
15:00	K. Phillips; Osbourne	Report		Stadium: Bloomfield Road; Attendance: 13,076; Referee: Wright

27 November 2012 19	Blackpool	1–1	Birmingham City	Blackpool, England
20:00	Ince	Report		Stadium: Bloomfield Road; Attendance: 13,111; Referee: Pawson

1 December 2012 20	Peterborough United	1–4	Blackpool	Peterborough, England
15:00	Gayle	Report	Thomas; Ince 2 Dicko	Stadium: London Road; Attendance: 5,633; Referee: Webb

8 December 2012 21	Crystal Palace	2–2	Blackpool	London, England
15:00	Zaha; Murray	Report	Delfouneso; Dicko	Stadium: Selhurst Park; Attendance: 15,594; Referee: Stroud

15 December 2012 22	Blackpool	2–0	Blackburn Rovers	Blackpool, England
15:00	Thomas; Broadfoot	Report		Stadium: Bloomfield Road; Attendance: 15,907; Referee: Scott

21 December 2012 23	Blackpool	1–2	Wolverhampton Wanderers	Blackpool, England
19:45	Baptiste	Report	Ebanks-Blake (2)	Stadium: Bloomfield Road; Attendance: 14,556; Referee: Coote

26 December 2012 24	Huddersfield Town	1–1	Blackpool	Huddersfield, England
15:00		Report	Delfouneso	Stadium: John Smith's Stadium; Attendance: 16,832; Referee: Miller

29 December 2012 25	Middlesbrough	4–2	Blackpool	Middlesbrough, England
15:00		Report	Thomas; Basham	Stadium: Riverside Stadium; Attendance: 18,164; Referee: Attwell

1 January 2013 26	Blackpool	0–0	Hull City	Blackpool, England
15:00		Report		Stadium: Bloomfield Road; Attendance: 13,691; Referee: Taylor

12 January 2013 27	Charlton Athletic	2–1	Blackpool	Charlton, England
15:00		Report		Stadium: The Valley; Attendance: 16,846; Referee: Jones

19 January 2013 28	Blackpool	1–2	Cardiff City	Blackpool, England
17:20		Report		Stadium: Bloomfield Road; Attendance: 13,998; Referee: Naylor

26 January 2013 29	Wolverhampton Wanderers	1–2	Blackpool	Wolverhampton, England
15:00		Report	Ince (2)	Stadium: Molineux; Attendance: 20,100; Referee: Mathieson

2 February 2013 30	Blackpool	1–2	Barnsley	Blackpool, England
15:00	Ince	Report		Stadium: Bloomfield Road; Attendance: 13,695; Referee: Eltrigham

9 February 2013 31	Blackpool	2–1	Millwall	Blackpool, England
15:00	Ince; Delfouneso	Report		Stadium: Bloomfield Road; Attendance: 12,653; Referee: Webb

16 February 2013 32	Ipswich Town	1–0	Blackpool	Ipswich, England
15:00		Report		Stadium: Portman Road; Attendance: 16,673; Referee: Madley

20 February 2013 33	Leeds United	2–0	Blackpool	Leeds, England
20:00		Report		Stadium: Elland Road; Attendance: 25,532; Referee: Boyeson

23 February 2013 34	Blackpool	0–0	Leicester City	Blackpool, England
15:00		Report		Stadium: Bloomfield Road; Attendance: 14,509; Referee: Hooper

2 March 2013 35	Blackpool	0–0	Bristol City	Blackpool, England
15:00		Report		Stadium: Bloomfield Road; Attendance: 12,934; Referee: Russell

5 March 2013 36	Birmingham City	1–1	Blackpool	Birmingham, England
19:45		Report	Broadfoot	Stadium: St Andrew's; Attendance: 13,532; Referee: Phillips

9 March 2013 37	Watford	1–2	Blackpool	Watford, England
15:00		Report	Ince; MacKenzie	Stadium: Vicarage Road; Attendance: 13,857; Referee: Madley

16 March 2013 38	Blackpool	0–1	Peterborough United	Blackpool, England
15:00		Report		Stadium: Bloomfield Road; Attendance: 13,037; Referee: Haywood

29 March 2013 39	Blackburn Rovers	1–1	Blackpool	Blackburn, England
15:00		Report		Stadium: Ewood Park; Attendance: 17,764; Referee: Russell

1 April 2013 40	Blackpool	1–0	Crystal Palace	Blackpool, England
15:00	M. Phillips	Report		Stadium: Bloomfield Road; Attendance: 14,373; Referee: Haines

6 April 2013 41	Nottingham Forest	1–1	Blackpool	Nottingham, England
15:00		Report	Sylvestre	Stadium: City Ground; Attendance: 22,814; Referee: Pawson

13 April 2013 42	Blackpool	1–0	Burnley	Blackpool, England
15:00	Sylvestre	Report		Stadium: Bloomfield Road; Attendance: 14,437; Referee: Whitestone

16 April 2013 43	Blackpool	0–0	Sheffield Wednesday	Blackpool, England
20:00		Report		Stadium: Bloomfield Road; Attendance: 13,845; Referee: Wright

20 April 2013 44	Brighton & Hove Albion	6–1	Blackpool	Brighton, England
15:00		Report		Stadium: Amex Stadium; Attendance: 28,499; Referee: Bates

27 April 2013 45	Blackpool	2–1	Derby County	Blackpool, England
15:00	Taylor-Fletcher; Sylvestre	Report		Stadium: Bloomfield Road; Attendance: 14,775; Referee: Ward

4 May 2013 46	Bolton Wanderers	2–2	Blackpool	Bolton, England
12:30		Report	M. Phillips; Sylvestre	Stadium: Reebok Stadium; Attendance: 24,844; Referee: East

=== League Cup ===
12 August 2012 Round One	Blackpool	1–2	Morecambe	Blackpool, England
15:00 BST	Baptiste 77'	Report	Alessandra 6'; Fleming 56'	Stadium: Bloomfield Road; Attendance: 6,083; Referee: Tierney

=== FA Cup ===
5 January 2013 Round Three	Fulham	1–1	Blackpool	Fulham, England
15:00 BST		Report	Sylvestre 60'	Stadium: Craven Cottage; Attendance: 14,473; Referee: Mason

15 January 2013 Round Three replay	Blackpool	1–2	Fulham	Blackpool, England
20:00 BST	Delfouneso 84'	Report		Stadium: Bloomfield Road; Attendance: 8,706; Referee: Marriner

== Statistics ==
=== Appearances and goals ===
As of 4 May 2013

No.	Pos	Nat	Player	Total		League		FA Cup		League Cup	
No.	Pos	Nat	Player	Apps	Goals	Apps	Goals	Apps	Goals	Apps	Goals
1	GK	(Scotland) SCO	Matt Gilks	47	0	44+0	0	2+0	0	1+0	0
2	DF	(England) ENG	Paul Bignot	0	0	0+0	0	0+0	0	0+0	0
3	DF	(Scotland) SCO	Stephen Crainey	45	0	42+0	0	1+1	0	1+0	0
4	MF	(Scotland) SCO	Scott Robertson	1	0	1+0	0	0+0	0	0+0	0
4	DF	(England) ENG	Reece Wabara (loan)	1	0	0+1	0	0+0	0	0+0	0
5	DF	(Wales) WAL	Neal Eardley	26	0	20+3	0	2+0	0	1+0	0
6	DF	(England) ENG	Ian Evatt	12	0	11+0	0	0+0	0	1+0	0
7	MF	(Scotland) SCO	Matt Phillips	35	4	28+6	4	0+0	0	1+0	0
8	MF	(Portugal) POR	Tiago Gomes	26	0	20+4	0	0+1	0	0+1	0
9	FW	(England) ENG	Kevin Phillips	18	2	9+8	2	1+0	0	0+0	0
10	MF	(France) FRA	Elliot Grandin	13	3	6+6	3	0+0	0	0+1	0
11	MF	(England) ENG	Tom Ince	46	18	41+2	18	2+0	0	1+0	0
12	MF	(England) ENG	Gary Taylor-Fletcher	36	5	27+7	5	1+0	0	1+0	0
14	MF	(Guadeloupe) GLP	Ludovic Sylvestre	31	5	21+7	4	1+1	1	1+0	0
15	DF	(England) ENG	Alex Baptiste	45	2	42+0	1	2+0	0	1+0	1
16	MF	(Scotland) SCO	Barry Ferguson	20	0	19+0	0	0+0	0	1+0	0
17	MF	(England) ENG	Chris Basham	27	1	23+2	1	2+0	0	0+0	0
18	MF	(England) ENG	Isaiah Osbourne	29	1	22+5	1	2+0	0	0+0	0
19	MF	(Spain) ESP	Alberto Noguera	1	0	0+1	0	0+0	0	0+0	0
20	DF	(Northern Ireland) NIR	Craig Cathcart	26	1	22+3	1	0+1	0	0+0	0
21	GK	(England) ENG	Mark Halstead	2	0	1+1	0	0+0	0	0+0	0
22	DF	(England) ENG	Ashley Eastham	0	0	0+0	0	0+0	0	0+0	0
23	MF	(Argentina) ARG	Gerardo Bruna	1	0	0+1	0	0+0	0	0+0	0
24	FW	(Scotland) SCO	Craig Sutherland	0	0	0+0	0	0+0	0	0+0	0
25	GK	(Scotland) SCO	Chris Kettings	0	0	0+0	0	0+0	0	0+0	0
26	MF	(England) ENG	Liam Tomsett	0	0	0+0	0	0+0	0	0+0	0
27	FW	(England) ENG	Tom Barkhuizen	1	0	0+0	0	0+0	0	0+1	0
28	MF	(England) ENG	Adam Dodd	0	0	0+0	0	0+0	0	0+0	0
29	MF	(England) ENG	Jamie Menagh	0	0	0+0	0	0+0	0	0+0	0
30	FW	(England) ENG	Louis Almond	0	0	0+0	0	0+0	0	0+0	0
31	MF	(Spain) ESP	Ángel Martínez	22	0	17+4	0	0+0	0	1+0	0
32	MF	(England) ENG	Curtis Thompson	0	0	0+0	0	0+0	0	0+0	0
33	DF	(Scotland) SCO	Bob Harris	5	0	3+1	0	1+0	0	0+0	0
34	FW	(England) ENG	Alex Addai	0	0	0+0	0	0+0	0	0+0	0
35	DF	(England) ENG	Jake Caprice	0	0	0+0	0	0+0	0	0+0	0
36	DF	(England) ENG	Matt Challoner	0	0	0+0	0	0+0	0	0+0	0
37	MF	(England) ENG	James Caton	0	0	0+0	0	0+0	0	0+0	0
38	FW	(France) FRA	Nouha Dicko (loan)	21	5	2+19	5	0+0	0	0+0	0
38	FW	(England) ENG	Matt Derbyshire (loan)	12	0	4+8	0	0+0	0	0+0	0
39	FW	(England) ENG	Wes Thomas (loan)	8	3	6+2	3	0+0	0	0+0	0
39	FW	(Scotland) SCO	Gary MacKenzie (loan)	12	2	12+0	2	0+0	0	0+0	0
40	FW	(England) ENG	Nathan Delfouneso (loan)	41	7	22+17	6	2+0	1	0+0	0
41	FW	(England) ENG	Nathan Eccleston	8	1	0+6	1	1+1	0	0+0	0
42	DF	(Scotland) SCO	Kirk Broadfoot	33	1	31+0	1	2+0	0	0+0	0
43	FW	(Hungary) HUN	Márkó Futács (loan)	3	0	0+3	0	0+0	0	0+0	0
—	FW	(Ivory Coast) CIV	Anderson Banvo	0	0	0+0	0	0+0	0	0+0	0
—	FW	(Algeria) ALG	Adda Djeziri	0	0	0+0	0	0+0	0	0+0	0

Players used: 32
Goals scored: 65 (62 League; 2 FA Cup; 1 League Cup) (includes two own-goals)

Note: Players in italics are no longer with Blackpool

== League table ==
Pos	Team	Pld	W	D	L	GF	GA	GD	Pts
13	Leeds United	46	17	10	19	57	66	−9	61
14	Ipswich Town	46	16	12	18	48	61	−13	60
15	Blackpool	46	14	17	15	62	63	−1	59
16	Middlesbrough	46	18	5	23	61	70	−9	59
17	Blackburn Rovers	46	14	16	16	55	62	−7	58

Updated to match(es) played on 4 May 2013. Source: BBC Sport
Rules for classification: 1) points; 2) goal difference; 3) number of goals scored.

== Transfers ==
=== Players in ===
Date	Position	Player	From	Fee	Source
9 July 2012	DF	Jake Caprice	—	Free	
20 July 2012	MF	Isaiah Osbourne	Hibernian	£250,000	
25 July 2012	MF	Tiago Gomes	—	Free	
27 July 2012	MF	Scott Robertson	—	Free	
14 August 2012	MF	James Caton	—	Free	
14 August 2012	FW	Adda Djeziri	—	Free	
14 August 2012	MF	Alberto Noguera	—	Free	
23 August 2012	FW	Anderson Banvo	—	Free	
23 August 2012	FW	Brice Irie-Bi	—	Free	
31 August 2012	FW	Nathan Eccleston	Liverpool	Undisclosed	
4 September 2012	DF	Kirk Broadfoot	—	Free	

=== Loans in ===
Date	Position	Player	From	Duration	Source
17 August 2012	FW	Nouha Dicko	Wigan Athletic	Season-long loan	
31 August 2012	FW	Nathan Delfouneso	Aston Villa	Season-long loan	
23 November 2012	FW	Wes Thomas	Bournemouth	Until 1 January	
25 January 2013	FW	Matt Derbyshire	Nottingham Forest	Until end of season	
31 January 2013	DF	Reece Wabara	Manchester City	Until end of season	
1 March 2013	DF	Gary MacKenzie	MK Dons	Until end of season	
5 March 2013	FW	Márkó Futács	Leicester City	One-month loan	

=== Players out ===
Date	Position	Player	To	Fee	Source
26 July 2012	MF	Keith Southern	Huddersfield Town	£300,000	
26 January 2013	MF	Scott Robertson		Released	

=== Loans out ===
Date from	Position	Player	To	Duration	Source
29 August 2012	FW	Tom Barkhuizen	Fleetwood Town	Until January	
29 August 2012	DF	Ashley Eastham	Fleetwood Town	One-month loan	
5 October 2012	DF	Ashley Eastham	Notts County	One-month loan	
October 2012	MF	Barry Ferguson	Fleetwood Town	Until January	

- ^1 Entered competition in Third Round
