= 2011–12 Blackpool F.C. season =

English football club season

Blackpool F.C.
2011–12 season
- Owner: Owen Oyston
- Chairman: Karl Oyston
- Manager: Ian Holloway
- Stadium: Bloomfield Road; Blackpool, England (Capacity: 16,220)
- Football League Championship: 5th
- FA Cup: Fifth round^{1}
- League Cup: First round
- Top goalscorer: League: Kevin Phillips (16); All: Kevin Phillips (17)
| Home colours | Away colours |

The 2011–12 season was Blackpool F.C.'s first season back in the Football League Championship, the second tier of English professional football, after being relegated from the Premier League at the conclusion of 2010–11 campaign. It was their 103rd overall season in the Football League. It was Ian Holloway's third season as manager.

The club finished the regular season in fifth position, thus qualifying them for the play-offs. They reached the final, in which they lost to West Ham 1–2.

Kevin Phillips, in his first season at Blackpool, finished as the club's top scorer with seventeen goals (sixteen in the League).

== Season summary ==
=== Pre-season ===
Over the summer, the club released nine players. They were goalkeepers Paul Rachubka and Richard Kingson; defenders Rob Edwards, David Carney and Danny Coid; midfielders Malaury Martin (who did not make any appearances for the club), former club captain Jason Euell and Ishmel Demontagnac; and forward Marlon Harewood. In addition, on-loan defender Salaheddine Sbaï returned to Nîmes without appearing for the Seasiders, forward Sergei Kornilenko's loan move was also not made permanent, and midfielder Andy Reid decided not to extend his short-term contract.

The first arrival at Bloomfield Road was midfielder Bojan Djordjic, who had played under Ian Holloway at Plymouth Argyle.

Two more departures occurred in early July. Midfielder Charlie Adam sealed his move to Kenny Dalglish's Liverpool for a £7-million fee. The Blackpool supporters' Player of the Year the previous term and Adam's midfield partner for the previous campaign, David Vaughan, also left after turning down a new contract. He signed for Sunderland on 7 July.

Also in early July, the club tied-up contract extensions with four players: goalkeeper Matthew Gilks and defenders Stephen Crainey, Ashley Eastham and Ian Evatt.

On 9 July, former Preston North End left back Matt Hill signed on a free transfer. He joined the club at their pre-season training camp in Portugal.

The following day, former England striker and European Golden Shoe winner Kevin Phillips joined, again on a free transfer.

On 18 July, the eve of Blackpool's first pre-season friendly against Rangers, the club signed 20-year-old Argentine midfielder Gerardo Bruna from Liverpool on a two-year contract.

Four days later, former Scotland international midfielder Barry Ferguson signed from Birmingham City, where he had been playing with Kevin Phillips, for £750,000, in a two-year deal with an option for a third. Fellow Scot, left-back Bob Harris, joined from Queen of the South. Another defender, Paul Bignot, became Ian Holloway's third signing in 24 hours when he joined from Newport County.

On 25 July, Spanish midfielder Ángel Martínez joined on a two-year contract, with an option for a third, from Espanyol. This gave Ian Holloway a squad of 31 going into Blackpool's final pre-season friendly against Hibernian the following day.

Prior to the evening kick-off against Hibs, Blackpool completed the signing of 22-year-old Scottish striker Craig Sutherland, who was playing in the US college leagues.

A tenth close-season signing occurred on 3 August, when Liverpool midfielder Tom Ince, son of former England captain Paul, put pen to paper to seal a two-year deal, with an option for a third year.

On the eve of the new season, D. J. Campbell sealed his drawn-out move to Q.P.R. for an undisclosed fee believed to be around £1.2 million. The same day, Spanish centre back Miguel Ángel Llera joined the club on a free transfer. He had been on trial with the Seasiders, and scored a free-kick in Blackpool's friendly defeat to Lancaster City three days earlier. The same day, Louis Almond joined Barrow on loan. This gave Ian Holloway a squad of 33 to choose from for the 5 August League visit to Hull City.

=== Season proper ===
Hull City hosted Ian Holloway's men in a Friday-night curtain-raiser for the 2011–12 Football League season. Six of the players that started against Manchester United in the club's final Premier League fixture 75 days earlier were featured in the starting line-up. They were Matt Gilks, Stephen Crainey, Ian Evatt, Alex Baptiste, Keith Southern and Gary Taylor-Fletcher. Meanwhile, starting debuts were given to Barry Ferguson and Kevin Phillips, while fellow new boy Craig Sutherland came on as a late substitute for Taylor-Fletcher. Matt Hill was an unused substitute. It was Taylor-Fletcher who scored the only goal of the game, on 81 minutes, to give Blackpool a perfect start to the campaign. The Tangerines topped the table for less than 24 hours, however: Ipswich Town replaced them the following day after their 3–0 victory at Bristol City.

Six days later, Blackpool travelled to Hillsborough to take on Sheffield Wednesday in the first round of the League Cup, with Ian Holloway naming a completely different starting eleven to that of the previous game. The tie finished goalless after both ninety minutes of normal time and thirty of extra. To a penalty shootout it went, and Wednesday, managed by former Seasiders boss Gary Megson, won 4–2.

It was back to League action on 14 August, and Blackpool hosted Peterborough United for the first home fixture of the campaign. Kevin Phillips opened the scoring one minute before half-time. He then doubled the Tangerines' lead three minutes into the second half. Six minutes from time, the visitors' George Boyd pulled one back. With their victory, which maintained their 100% start to the League campaign, Blackpool moved up to third in the table. With his substitute appearance, Matt Phillips became the 26th player used by Ian Holloway in their three games.

The Seasiders then hosted Derby County in a midweek fixture at Bloomfield Road. The visitors, with a single goal, inflicted the hosts' first League defeat of the campaign. Blackpool slipped five places to eighth as a result.

On 19 August, Ian Holloway's men endured an eight-and-a-half-hour coach ride down to the south coast to face Brighton & Hove Albion the following day. Craig Mackail-Smith opened the scoring for the Seagulls just before the half-hour mark. The lead was doubled five minutes into the second half via Ashley Barnes. Kevin Phillips pulled one back for the Tangerines on the hour mark, before levelling matters in the 90th minute. It was Phillips' fourth goal in as many games for his new club. Blackpool remained eighth.

Eight days later, Blackpool again took to the road, this time Crystal Palace being the opposition. Alex Baptiste opened his goalscoring account for the season, with a 41st-minute strike. With eleven minutes remaining, Glenn Murray equalised for the Eagles. Blackpool climbed to seventh place with the result.

On 31 August, transfer-deadline day in England, Blackpool secured the services of two players. The first, in a permanent, one-year deal, was Maltese forward Daniel Bogdanović, from Sheffield United for £250,000. The other was West Bromwich Albion right-back James Hurst, on loan for the rest of the season. He was, however, recalled in October.

After an international break, Blackpool hosted Paul Jewell's Ipswich Town at Bloomfield Road on 10 September. After a goalless first half, Gary Taylor-Fletcher put the hosts ahead four minutes after the break. Barry Ferguson, with his first goal in English football for seven years, doubled Blackpool's lead on the hour mark, before leaving the game with a hamstring injury with fourteen minutes remaining. Blackpool climbed one place to seventh with their victory. With eleven points taken from a possible eighteen, it has been Blackpool's best start to a League season in twenty years.

Cardiff City were the visitors to Bloomfield Road a week later – the first meeting between the two clubs since Blackpool's victory in the play-off final sixteen months earlier. The visitors took the lead through Don Cowie four minutes into the second half. Kevin Phillips equalised for the Tangerines just after the hour mark – his fifth League goal in seven games. Blackpool remained seventh with the point gained.

On 24 September, Blackpool made the long trip to the south coast to face Portsmouth at Fratton Park. Matt Phillips was given a rare start by Ian Holloway, but the 20-year-old missed two golden chances in the first half. He was substituted in favour of Ludovic Sylvestre nine minutes after the restart. The game remained goalless until the fourth minute of added time, when Norwegian Erik Huseklepp netted the vital goal. Blackpool slipped one place to eighth with the defeat, which ended a four-game unbeaten streak.

Three days later, Coventry City were the opposition at the Ricoh Arena. Gary Taylor-Fletcher opened the scoring on eighteen minutes. Gary Deegan leveled for the hosts an hour later. Lukas Jutkiewicz put the Sky Blues ahead five minutes later, before Keith Southern equalised two minutes into stoppage time. Blackpool sat in tenth place with the result.

On 1 October, Blackpool marked their tenth League fixture with a 5–0 victory over Bristol City at Bloomfield Road. Gary Taylor-Fletcher, with his fourth goal of the season, put the Tangerines in front eight minutes before the break. Jonjo Shelvey, signed the previous day on loan from Liverpool, doubled the lead with a low thirty-yard free-kick. Daniel Bogdanovic opened his scoring account for Ian Holloway's men with the third, on 83 minutes. Two minutes into injury time, Brett Ormerod made it four. Bogdanovic scored his second and Blackpool's fifth in the 94th minute.

After a two-week break, Blackpool suffered a heavy defeat, 4–0, at the hands of West Ham United at Upton Park. They dropped to thirteenth place with the loss.

Three days later, they returned to winning ways, at home to Doncaster Rovers, courtesy of a stoppage-time winner from Tom Ince. It was his second of the game. He had levelled proceedings just after the hour mark with his first goal for the club. The three points lifted Blackpool to eighth.

Two successive defeats ensued — 1–2 at Nottingham Forest and 1–3 at Burnley — before a 5–0 whitewash of Leeds United at Elland Road on 2 November. It was former Seasiders manager Simon Grayson's first meeting with the club since he left them in 2006. Goalkeeper Paul Rachubka, who crossed the Pennines during the summer, was at fault for three of Blackpool's goals, and he was withdrawn at half time in favour of 18-year-old Alex Cairns. Blackpool climbed to eighth place with the victory.

Three days later, Blackpool hosted Millwall at Bloomfield Road in what was Ian Holloway's 100th league game in charge of the club. Kevin Phillips struck the only goal of the game on 61 minutes, just two minutes after coming on as a substitute for Keith Southern. It was Phillips' seventh goal of the campaign. Blackpool, who had taken six points and scored as many goals in four days, moved up to fifth. It was also their second-consecutive clean sheet.

Two 2–2 draws ensued — at Middlesbrough on 19 November, then the following week at home to Birmingham City. Ludovic Sylvestre and Jonjo Shelvey netted in the first fixture, while full-back duo Stephen Crainey and Neal Eardley scored the goals in the latter. Blackpool moved into the play-off places with the second of the two points.

A midweek trip to Leicester City resulted in a 2–0 defeat, meaning Ian Holloway had yet to beat his former club as a manager. Blackpool dropped two places to eighth with the result.

December was rung in with the visit of Reading to the seaside. The Seasiders' on-loan forward Callum McManaman scored the only goal of the game ten minutes into the second half to give the hosts the three points, which moved them up one place to seventh.

The following week, Blackpool made the long trip to table-toppers Southampton. Former Tangerine Rickie Lambert opened the scoring on the half-hour mark. Chris Basham, making only his second League start of the season, brought the visitors level six minutes later with his first goal for Blackpool. Callum McManaman put Blackpool ahead four minutes into the second half with his second goal in as many games. Lambert equalised for Southampton three minutes into injury time, preserving their unbeaten home record for the campaign; however, the result ended their 21-match winning run at St Mary's. Blackpool slipped one place to eighth with the point.

Watford visited Bloomfield Road on 17 December for what turned out to be a goalless draw. Blackpool remained eighth.

On Boxing Day, Blackpool travelled to face Barnsley at Oakwell. Mark Howard made his debut in the Blackpool goal, replacing the injured Matt Gilks. The hosts' Matt Done opened the scoring on eighteen minutes. Just under twenty minutes later, Matt Phillips opened his scoring account for the season for Blackpool. On 67 minutes, Phillips put the visitors ahead, before completing his hat-trick from the penalty spot eight minutes from time. Blackpool climbed one place to seventh.

New Year's Eve saw a visit to Birmingham City, with Barry Ferguson facing the club he left in the summer. Ferguson was sent off ten minutes into the second half, with Blackpool 2–0 down. Nathan Redmond sealed the result in the final minute. Blackpool dropped to ninth with the defeat.

Blackpool rang in 2012 by welcoming Middlesbrough to the seaside. Matt Phillips opened the scoring five minutes after the break. Seven minutes later, Lomana LuaLua doubled the lead. A Seb Hines own goal on 70 minutes ended the scoring. Blackpool climbed back up to seventh with the three points.

On 7 January, Blackpool raised the curtain on their FA Cup campaign with a seven-mile trip to Fylde coast neighbours Fleetwood Town, managed by former Seasiders midfielder Micky Mellon. Lomana LuaLua broke the deadlock on 24 minutes. Two minutes after the restart, Matt Phillips doubled Blackpool's lead. On 55 minutes, Tom Ince made it three. The Cod Army pulled a goal back through Jamie Vardy before Phillips (77' and 81') completed his second hat-trick in as many weeks (and in the process became the club's joint-top scorer with namesake Kevin Phillips) to put Blackpool through to the Fourth Round with a 5–1 scoreline.

Seven days later, Blackpool travelled to face Paul Jewell's Ipswich Town at Portman Road. The Tractor Boys went two goals up within an hour, through a Ángel Martínez own goal and a Tommy Smith header, before substitutes Elliot Grandin and Kevin Phillips rescued a point for the visitors, which dropped them two places to ninth.

On 21 January, Blackpool hosted Crystal Palace. Dougie Freedman's men took the lead via an Owen Garvan penalty just before the half-hour mark. The score remained the same until five minutes from the end of normal time, when substitute Elliot Grandin scored his second goal in as many games. Also for the second consecutive game, it was two substitutes who scored, this time Chris Basham, with his second of the campaign, with thirty seconds remaining, to give the Seasiders the three points. They moved up to seventh with the victory.

A week later, and Blackpool faced Sheffield Wednesday in a cup competition for the second time this season, this time the FA Cup fourth round at Bloomfield Road. Clinton Morrison put the Owls ahead seven minutes into the second half. Kevin Phillips sent the match to a replay with an injury-time penalty.

On 31 January, Blackpool repeated the feat of coming back from a goal down in the dying minutes, this time against bottom club Coventry City. Conor Thomas put the visitors ahead just inside the hour, but strikes from Kevin Phillips (87') and Gary Taylor-Fletcher (94') gave the Tangerines the three points, which lifted them two places to sixth, the final play-off position.

Into February, and Blackpool travelled to Wales to face third-placed Cardiff City. The Bluebirds took the lead just before the hour mark, via Joe Mason. Substitute Kevin Phillips levelled twenty minutes later, with his tenth League goal of the campaign, before a double from Matt Phillips sealed the victory for Blackpool. With the three points, their third consecutive victory, the Seasiders climbed three places to fourth — two points behind their hosts and eight behind leaders West Ham.

Blackpool coupled their third consecutive victory with a progression to the Fifth Round of the FA Cup after beating Sheffield Wednesday 3–0 at Hillsborough in their replay on 7 February. Matt Phillips opened the scoring on seven minutes, with his tenth goal of the season. Seven minutes later, Lomana LuaLua doubled their lead. Ludovic Sylvestre settled the tie on 54 minutes.

Back to League action on 11 February, and Blackpool hosted Portsmouth. Erik Huseklepp put Pompey ahead on the stroke of half-time. Fourteen minutes from time, Stephen Crainey levelled matters with a curling free-kick from just outside the penalty area. It was the first time he had scored two goals in one season. Blackpool slipped one place to fifth with the point.

Three days later, Blackpool made the midweek trip to Doncaster Rovers. Gary Taylor-Fletcher put the visitors two goals ahead with strikes on 20 minutes and 34 minutes. El Hadji Diouf pulled one back for Donny from the penalty spot two minutes before the break. Frenchman Nouha Dicko, on loan from Wigan Athletic, notched his first goal for Blackpool on 72 minutes, sealing the three points for Ian Holloway's men, which moved them back up to fourth.

A trip to Everton in the last sixteen of the FA Cup occurred on 18 February. It was the two clubs' first-ever meeting in the FA Cup. It was also Blackpool's furthest venture in the competition since the 1989–90 campaign, when they were knocked out by Q.P.R. The Seasiders' exit was effectively sealed six minutes into the tie, at which point they were already two goals down. An unmarked Royston Drenthe put the Toffees ahead after 49 seconds. Denis Stracqualursi doubled their lead four minutes later, and that's how the score remained. A mostly second-string Blackpool — captained in Barry Ferguson's absence by Alex Baptiste — lost Gary Taylor-Fletcher to injury just twenty minutes in. Kevin Phillips missed an injury-time penalty for Blackpool.

On 21 February, former Blackpool manager Sam Allardyce returned to Bloomfield Road with West Ham, his fifth managerial role since leaving the seaside fifteen years earlier. James Tomkins put the Hammers ahead just before the half-hour mark. Four minutes later, their lead was doubled via Nicky Maynard's close-range strike. On the stroke of half-time, Kevin Phillips, who came on ten minutes earlier for the out-of-sorts Chris Basham, scored his eleventh League goal of the campaign. Eight minutes after the break, West Ham's goalkeeper Robert Green was sent off for a professional foul on Roman Bednář. Midfielder Henri Lansbury was put in goal, and proceeded to keep the ball out of his net for the remainder of the game. Indeed, West Ham stretched their lead on 74 minutes, through Gary O'Neil, and sealed the victory in the final minute through Ricardo Vaz Te. Blackpool slipped to seventh with the defeat, their first in the League in 2012.

Four days later, Blackpool travelled to Bristol City, arch-rivals of Ian Holloway's former club, Bristol Rovers. City took the lead through Jon Stead after 29 minutes. Tom Ince, in front of watching father Paul, levelled ten minutes into the second half. Ince then put the Seasiders ahead on 84 minutes, three minutes before Kevin Phillips notched his thirteenth goal in all competitions. With the victory, their sixth in nine League games, Blackpool moved up three places to fourth.

Into March, and on the second Blackpool hosted Hull City at Bloomfield Road, the reverse fixture to that which opened the campaign. Tom Ince put Blackpool in front on 27 minutes with a thirty-yard strike, ending the Tigers' six-game run of clean sheets. A last-minute equaliser from Matty Fryatt prevented Blackpool from climbing into third, but they remained fourth.

Two successive away defeats ensued, at Derby County and Peterborough United, which saw Blackpool slip out of the play-off places into seventh.

They returned to winning ways on 17 March, with a 3–1 home victory over Brighton & Hove Albion. Joe Mattock put the Seagulls ahead after seven minutes. Ian Evatt levelled matters eight minutes before the break. Three minutes later, Kevin Phillips put Blackpool ahead. Ten minutes from time, Phillips doubled his tally and secured the three points for the hosts.

Kevin Phillips netted another brace in the midweek fixture with Leicester City, his second — scored in the fourth minute of injury time — earned Blackpool a point in a 3–3 draw. Roman Bednar, with his first goal for the club, scored Blackpool's second.

On 24 March, Blackpool travelled to Reading. They returned empty-handed after a 3–1 defeat. Lomana LuaLua scored Blackpool's goal.

Seven days later, Blackpool closed out March by hosting top-of-the-table Southampton. Ian Holloway rang the changes — seven in total — after their previous result. Recent loan signing, the returning Stephen Dobbie (who became the tenth Scot in the Blackpool squad), opened the scoring with a 22nd-minute penalty. He doubled the Seasiders' lead nine minutes later with a route-one strike. Ian Evatt headed in a third on 52 minutes from Matt Phillips' corner to seal the three points. Blackpool climbed back into the play-off zone with the three points.

A Good Friday visit to Watford resulted in a second successive victory and clean sheet. Another Stephen Dobbie double, including another from the penalty spot, ended the Hornets' seven-game unbeaten run and put Blackpool three points clear of sixth-placed Brighton, who lost at Burnley.

Three days later, a struggling Barnsley visited Bloomfield Road and held on for a draw after taking the lead two minutes into the second half. Matt Phillips leveled for the hosts on 71 minutes.

Another — this time goalless — draw followed, at Nottingham Forest, on 14 April.

Blackpool returned to winning ways on 17 April, with a single-goal result against Neil Warnock's Leeds United at Bloomfield Road. Ángel Martínez got the goal, his first in English football. He became Blackpool's 22nd different goalscorer of the season. The Tangerines remained fifth — two places inside the play-off zone — four points clear of seventh-placed Middlesbrough.

Four days later, Blackpool secured a play-offs appearance for the second time in three seasons, with a 4–0 defeat of local rivals Burnley. Stephen Dobbie, returning after a brief spell out through injury, opened the scoring, with his fifth goal in as many starts. Gary Taylor-Fletcher doubled the lead early in the second half, with his eighth League goal of the campaign. Stephen Crainey made it 3–0 just after the hour mark, before Nouha Dicko completed the scoring with ten minutes remaining. The victory was Blackpool's fourth in their last six outings, and their third-successive clean sheet. It lifted them two places to fourth.

On 28 April, the final day of the regular season, Blackpool drew 2–2 at Millwall. The Lions went ahead, but Ian Evatt levelled with a header just before the half-hour mark. Nouha Dicko scored his second goal in as many games to put the visitors ahead, but Millwall restored parity in the final minute. Blackpool finished in fifth place, with 75 points to their name.

Blackpool hosted Birmingham City in the first leg of their play-off semi-final on 4 May. A Tom Ince strike, a minute before the break, was deflected past his own 'keeper by Curtis Davies. It proved to be the only goal of the game. The victory was Blackpool's tenth successive in play-off fixtures, dating back to 2001, when they were in the basement division.

The second leg, played five days later at St. Andrew's, ended 2–2, which meant Blackpool progressed to the final 2–3 on aggregate.

Blackpool faced West Ham in the final at Wembley on 19 May. The Hammers took the lead through a first-half Carlton Cole strike. Tom Ince levelled the game three minutes into the second half, but the Londoners scored what proved to be the winner on 87 minutes, via the boot of Ricardo Vaz Te.

== League table ==
| Pos | Team | Pld | W | D | L | GF | GA | GD | Pts | Promotion or relegation |
|---|---|---|---|---|---|---|---|---|---|---|
| 3 | West Ham United (O, P) | 46 | 24 | 14 | 8 | 81 | 48 | +33 | 86 | Qualification for Championship play-offs |
| 4 | Birmingham City | 46 | 20 | 16 | 10 | 78 | 51 | +27 | 76 | Qualification for Championship play-offs |
| 5 | Blackpool | 46 | 20 | 15 | 11 | 79 | 59 | +20 | 75 | Qualification for Championship play-offs |
| 6 | Cardiff City | 46 | 19 | 18 | 9 | 66 | 53 | +13 | 75 | Qualification for Championship play-offs |
| 7 | Middlesbrough | 46 | 18 | 16 | 12 | 52 | 51 | +1 | 70 | |

Updated to match(es) played on 28 April 2012. Source: BBC Sport
Rules for classification: 1) points; 2) goal difference; 3) number of goals scored.
(O) Play-off winners; (P) Promoted

== Results ==
=== Pre-season ===
| 19 July 2011 | Blackpool | 0–2 | Rangers | Bloomfield Road |
| 19:30 | | Report | Davis 35', 43' | Attendance: 9,398 |

| 23 July 2011 | Oldham Athletic | 2–1 | Blackpool | Boundary Park |
| 15:00 | Smith; Millar | Report | Clarke |

| 26 July 2011 | Blackpool | 2–0 | Hibernian | Bloomfield Road |
| 19:45 | Grandin 35'; Clarke 85' | Report |

| 28 July 2011 | Blackpool | 1–1 | FK Jelgava | Bloomfield Road |
| 19:00 | Sutherland | Report | Koklovs | Attendance: 1,858 |

| 31 July 2011 | Sheffield United | 1–1 | Blackpool | Bramall Lane |
| 15:00 | Porter 42' | | Sutherland 78' | Attendance: 5,696 |

| 1 August 2011 | Lancaster City | 3–1 | Blackpool | Giant Axe |
| 19:45 | Clark; Marshall; McKenna | Report | Llera |

=== Championship ===
| 5 August 2011 1 | Hull City | 0–1 | Blackpool | KC Stadium |
| 19:45 | | (Report) | Taylor-Fletcher 81' | Attendance: 18,907; Referee: Mathieson |

| 14 August 2011 2 | Blackpool | 2–1 | Peterborough United | Bloomfield Road |
| 15:00 | K. Phillips 44', 48' | (Report) | Boyd 82' | Attendance: 12,881; Referee: Boyeson |

| 17 August 2011 3 | Blackpool | 0–1 | Derby County | Bloomfield Road |
| 20:00 | | (Report) | Bryson 69' | Attendance: 13,489; Referee: Haywood |

| 20 August 2011 4 | Brighton & Hove Albion | 2–2 | Blackpool | Falmer Stadium |
| 15:00 | Mackail-Smith 29'; Barnes 50' | (Report) | K. Phillips 60', 90' | Attendance: 19,494; Referee: Gibbs |

| 27 August 2011 5 | Crystal Palace | 1–1 | Blackpool | Selhurst Park |
| 15:00 | Murray 79' | (Report) | Baptiste 41' | Attendance: 14,776; Referee: Marriner |

| 10 September 2011 6 | Blackpool | 2–0 | Ipswich Town | Bloomfield Road |
| 15:00 | Taylor-Fletcher 49'; Ferguson 60' | (Report) | | Attendance: 12,804; Referee: Webster |

| 17 September 2011 7 | Blackpool | 1–1 | Cardiff City | Bloomfield Road |
| 15:00 | K. Phillips 62' | (Report) | Cowie 49' | Attendance: 12,798; Referee: Moss |

| 24 September 2011 8 | Portsmouth | 1–0 | Blackpool | Fratton Park |
| 15:00 | Huseklepp 94' | (Report) | | Attendance: 14,935; Referee: Deadman |

| 27 September 2011 9 | Coventry City | 2–2 | Blackpool | Ricoh Arena |
| 19:30 | Deegan 78'; Jutkiewicz 83' | (Report) | Taylor-Fletcher 18'; Southern 92' | Attendance: 12,822; Referee: Woolmer |

| 1 October 2011 10 | Blackpool | 5–0 | Bristol City | Bloomfield Road |
| 15:00 | Taylor-Fletcher 37'; Shelvey 66'; Bogdanovic 83', 94'; Ormerod 92' | (Report) | | Attendance: 11,734; Referee: Webb |

| 15 October 2011 11 | West Ham United | 4–0 | Blackpool | Upton Park |
| 15:00 | Carew 12'; Baldock 47', 51'; Collison 55' | (Report) | | Referee: D'Urso |

| 18 October 2011 12 | Blackpool | 2–1 | Doncaster Rovers | Bloomfield Road |
| 20:00 | Ince 63', 94' | (Report) | Sharp 27' | Attendance: 11,587; Referee: Eltringham |

| 22 October 2011 13 | Blackpool | 1–2 | Nottingham Forest | Bloomfield Road |
| 15:00 | K. Phillips 43' | (Report) | Morgan 39'; Majewski 76' | Attendance: 13,520; Referee: Waugh |

| 29 October 2011 14 | Burnley | 3–1 | Blackpool | Turf Moor |
| 17:30 | Austin 20'; Wallace 29'; Bartley 79' | (Report) | Shelvey 90+3' | Referee: Oliver |

| 2 November 2011 15 | Leeds United | 0–5 | Blackpool | Elland Road |
| 19:45 | | (Report) | LuaLua 13', 65'; Shelvey 27' (pen.), 31', 78' | Attendance: 22,423; Referee: East |

| 5 November 2011 16 | Blackpool | 1–0 | Millwall | Bloomfield Road |
| 15:00 | K. Phillips 61' | (Report) | | Attendance: 12,455; Referee: Haines |

| 19 November 2011 17 | Middlesbrough | 2–2 | Blackpool | Riverside Stadium |
| 15:00 | McDonald 15', 73' | (Report) | Sylvestre 21'; Shelvey 78' | Attendance: 18,128; Referee: Coote |

| 26 November 2011 18 | Blackpool | 2–2 | Birmingham City | Bloomfield Road |
| 15:00 | Crainey 31'; Eardley 57' | (Report) | King 28'; Žigić 87' | Attendance: 13,436; Referee: Graham |

| 29 November 2011 19 | Leicester City | 2–0 | Blackpool | King Power Stadium |
| 19:45 | King 35'; Danns 82' | (Report) | | Attendance: 21,578; Referee: Scott |

| 3 December 2011 20 | Blackpool | 1–0 | Reading | Bloomfield Road |
| 15:00 | McManaman 55' | (Report) | | Attendance: 11,656; Referee: Brown |

| 10 December 2011 21 | Southampton | 2–2 | Blackpool | St Mary's Stadium |
| 12:45 | Lambert 31', 90+3' | (Report) | Basham 36'; McManaman 49' | Attendance: 22,776; Referee: Eltringham |

| 17 December 2011 22 | Blackpool | 0–0 | Watford | Bloomfield Road |
| 15:00 | | (Report) | | Attendance: 11,652; Referee: Haywood |

| 26 December 2011 23 | Barnsley | 1–3 | Blackpool | Oakwell |
| 15:00 | Done 18' | (Report) | M. Phillips 37', 67', 82' (pen.) | Attendance: 11,776; Referee: Webster |

| 31 December 2011 24 | Birmingham City | 3–0 | Blackpool | St Andrew's |
| 15:00 | Davies 45'; King 52'; Redmond 89' | (Report) | Ferguson (red card) 55' | Attendance: 19,995; Referee: Pawson |

| 2 January 2012 25 | Blackpool | 3–0 | Middlesbrough | Bloomfield Road |
| 15:00 | M. Phillips 50'; LuaLua 57'; Hines 70' (o.g.) | (Report) | | Attendance: 13,449; Referee: Mathieson |

| 14 January 2012 26 | Ipswich Town | 2–2 | Blackpool | Portman Road |
| 15:00 | Ángel 10' (o.g.); Smith 60' | (Report) | Grandin 65'; K. Phillips 80' | Attendance: 16,497; Referee: Ward |

| 21 January 2012 27 | Blackpool | 2–1 | Crystal Palace | Bloomfield Road |
| 15:00 | Grandin 85'; Basham 90' | (Report) | Garvan 27' (pen.) | Attendance: 12,053; Referee: Miller |

| 31 January 2012 28 | Blackpool | 2–1 | Coventry City | Bloomfield Road |
| 19:30 | K. Phillips 87'; Taylor-Fletcher 90+4' | (Report) | Thomas 59' | Attendance: 11,414; Referee: Mohareb |

| 4 February 2012 29 | Cardiff City | 1–3 | Blackpool | Cardiff City Stadium |
| 15:00 | Mason 59' | (Report) | K. Phillips 79'; M. Phillips 83', 90+1' | Attendance: 22,577; Referee: Stroud |

| 11 February 2012 30 | Blackpool | 1–1 | Portsmouth | Bloomfield Road |
| 17:20 | Crainey 76' | (Report) | Huseklepp 45' | Attendance: 12,545; Referee: Madley |

| 14 February 2012 31 | Doncaster Rovers | 1–3 | Blackpool | Keepmoat Stadium |
| 19:45 | Diouf 43' (pen.) | (Report) | Taylor-Fletcher 20', 34'; Dicko 72' | Attendance: 8,319; Referee: Sutton |

| 21 February 2012 32 | Blackpool | 1–4 | West Ham | Bloomfield Road |
| 20:00 | K. Phillips 45' | (Report) | Tomkins 28'; Maynard 32'; Green (red card) 53'; O'Neil 74'; Vaz Te 90' | Attendance: 13,043; Referee: Langford |

| 25 February 2012 33 | Bristol City | 1–3 | Blackpool | Ashton Gate Stadium |
| 15:00 | Stead 29' | (Report) | Ince 55', 84'; K. Phillips 87' | Attendance: 13,192; Referee: Kettle |

| 2 March 2012 34 | Blackpool | 1–1 | Hull City | Bloomfield Road |
| 19:45 | Ince 27' | (Report) | Fryatt 90' | Attendance: 12,491; Referee: Ilderton |

| 6 March 2012 35 | Derby County | 2–1 | Blackpool | Pride Park |
| 19:45 | S. Davies 51', 75' | (Report) | Ince 2' | Attendance: 26,320; Referee: Boyeson |

| 10 March 2012 36 | Peterborough United | 3–1 | Blackpool | London Road |
| 15:00 | | (Report) | Dicko 80' | Attendance: 7,540; Referee: Haywood |

| 17 March 2012 37 | Blackpool | 3–1 | Brighton & Hove Albion | Bloomfield Road |
| 15:00 | Evatt 37'; K. Phillips 40', 80' | (Report) | Mattock 7' | Attendance: 12,782; Referee: Hooper |

| 21 March 2012 38 | Blackpool | 3–3 | Leicester City | Bloomfield Road |
| 20:00 | K. Phillips 33', 94'; Bednar 69' | (Report) | | Attendance: 12,485; Referee: Naylor |

| 24 March 2012 39 | Reading | 3–1 | Blackpool | Madejski Stadium |
| 15:00 | | (Report) | LuaLua 41' | Attendance: 20,906; Referee: Graham |

| 31 March 2012 40 | Blackpool | 3–0 | Southampton | Bloomfield Road |
| 17:20 | Dobbie 22' (pen.), 31'; Evatt 52' | (Report) | | Attendance: 13,499; Referee: Whitestone |

| 6 April 2012 41 | Watford | 0–2 | Blackpool | Vicarage Road |
| 15:00 | | (Report) | Dobbie 25', 70' (pen.) | Attendance: 16,314; Referee: Linington |

| 9 April 2012 42 | Blackpool | 1–1 | Barnsley | Bloomfield Road |
| 15:00 | M. Phillips 71' | (Report) | Perkins 47' | Attendance: 13,525; Referee: D'Urso |

| 14 April 2012 43 | Nottingham Forest | 0–0 | Blackpool | City Ground |
| 15:00 | | (Report) | | Attendance: 24,078; Referee: Miller |

| 17 April 2012 44 | Blackpool | 1–0 | Leeds United | Bloomfield Road |
| 20:00 | Ángel 79' | (Report) | | Attendance: 14,134; Referee: Bates |

| 21 April 2012 45 | Blackpool | 4–0 | Burnley | Bloomfield Road |
| 15:00 | Dobbie 21'; Taylor-Fletcher 47'; Crainey 62'; Dicko 80' | (Report) | | Attendance: 14,141; Referee: Sarginson |

| 28 April 2012 46 | Millwall | 2–2 | Blackpool | The Den |
| 12:30 | Keogh 12'; Kane 83' | (Report) | Evatt 27'; Dicko 71' | Attendance: 13,122; Referee: Attwell |

==== Play-offs ====
| 4 May 2012 Semi-final, first leg | Blackpool | 1–0 | Birmingham City | Bloomfield Road |
| 19:45 | Davies 45' (own-goal) | (Report) | | Attendance: 13,832; Referee: Halsey |

| 9 May 2012 Semi-final, second leg | Birmingham City | 2–2 (2–3 agg.) | Blackpool | St Andrew's |
| 19:45 | Žigić 64'; Davies 73' | (Report) | Dobbie 45'; Phillips 48' | Attendance: 28,483; Referee: Foy |

| 19 May 2012 Final | Blackpool | 1–2 | West Ham | Wembley Stadium |
| 15:00 | | (Report) | | Attendance: 78,523; Referee: Webb |

=== League Cup ===
| 11 August 2011 Round 1 | Sheffield Wednesday | 0–0 (a.e.t.) (4–2 p) | Blackpool | Hillsborough Stadium |
| 19:45 | | (Report) | | Attendance: 5,240; Referee: Ilderton |
| | Penalties |
| | Palmer (penalty scored); Otsemobor (penalty scored); Morrison (penalty scored); O'Connor (penalty scored) | | Clarke (penalty missed); Eardley (penalty missed); Sylvestre (penalty scored); Llera (penalty scored) |

=== FA Cup ===
| 7 January 2012 Round 3 | Fleetwood Town | 1–5 | Blackpool | Highbury Stadium |
| 15:00 | Vardy 70' | (Report) | LuaLua 24'; M. Phillips 47', 77', 81'; Ince 55' | Attendance: 5,092; Referee: Whitestone |

| 28 January 2012 Round 4 | Blackpool | 1–1 | Sheffield Wednesday | Bloomfield Road |
| 15:00 | Morrison 52' | (Report) | K. Phillips 90+3' (pen.) | Attendance: 14,042; Referee: Deadman |

| 7 February 2012 Round 4 replay | Sheffield Wednesday | 0–3 | Blackpool | Hillsborough Stadium |
| 19:45 | | (Report) | M. Phillips 7'; LuaLua 14'; Sylvestre 54' | Attendance: 10,274; Referee: D'Urso |

| 18 February 2012 Round 5 | Everton | 2–0 | Blackpool | Goodison Park |
| 15:05 | Drenthe 1'; Stracqualursi 6' | (Report) | | Attendance: 38,347; Referee: Oliver |

== Squad statistics ==
| No. | Pos | Nat | Player | Total | | League | | League play-offs | | FA Cup | | League Cup | |
| No. | Pos | Nat | Player | Apps | Goals | Apps | Goals | Apps | Goals | Apps | Goals | Apps | Goals |
|---|---|---|---|---|---|---|---|---|---|---|---|---|---|
| 1 | GK | (Scotland) SCO | Matt Gilks | 48 | 0 | 42+0 | 0 | 3+0 | 0 | 3+0 | 0 | 0+0 | 0 |
| 2 | DF | (England) ENG | Paul Bignot | 0 | 0 | 0+0 | 0 | 0+0 | 0 | 0+0 | 0 | 0+0 | 0 |
| 3 | DF | (Scotland) SCO | Stephen Crainey | 45 | 3 | 40+2 | 3 | 3+0 | 0 | 0+0 | 0 | 0+0 | 0 |
| 4 | MF | (England) ENG | Keith Southern | 27 | 1 | 24+1 | 1 | 0+1 | 0 | 1+0 | 0 | 0+0 | 0 |
| 5 | DF | (Wales) WAL | Neal Eardley | 32 | 1 | 22+3 | 1 | 3+0 | 0 | 3+0 | 0 | 1+0 | 0 |
| 6 | DF | (England) ENG | Ian Evatt | 42 | 3 | 37+2 | 3 | 3+0 | 0 | 0+0 | 0 | 0+0 | 0 |
| 7 | FW | (Republic of Ireland) IRL | Billy Clarke | 11 | 0 | 4+5 | 0 | 0+0 | 0 | 1+0 | 0 | 1+0 | 0 |
| 7 | FW | (Scotland) SCO | Stephen Dobbie | 10 | 6 | 5+2 | 5 | 3+0 | 1 | 0+0 | 0 | 0+0 | 0 |
| 8 | MF | (France) FRA | Elliot Grandin | 7 | 2 | 4+3 | 2 | 0+0 | 0 | 0+0 | 0 | 0+0 | 0 |
| 9 | FW | (England) ENG | Kevin Phillips | 44 | 17 | 20+17 | 16 | 1+2 | 0 | 3+1 | 1 | 0+0 | 0 |
| 10 | FW | (England) ENG | Brett Ormerod | 16 | 1 | 10+6 | 1 | 0+0 | 0 | 0+0 | 0 | 0+0 | 0 |
| 11 | MF | (Argentina) ARG | Gerardo Bruna | 3 | 0 | 0+1 | 0 | 0+0 | 0 | 0+1 | 0 | 0+1 | 0 |
| 12 | MF | (England) ENG | Gary Taylor-Fletcher | 42 | 8 | 34+3 | 8 | 2+0 | 0 | 1+2 | 0 | 0+0 | 0 |
| 13 | FW | (Malta) MLT | Daniel Bogdanović | 8 | 2 | 1+7 | 2 | 0+0 | 0 | 0+0 | 0 | 0+0 | 0 |
| 14 | MF | (Guadeloupe) GLP | Ludovic Sylvestre | 33 | 2 | 20+8 | 1 | 0+1 | 0 | 3+0 | 1 | 1+0 | 0 |
| 15 | DF | (England) ENG | Alex Baptiste | 49 | 1 | 43+0 | 1 | 3+0 | 0 | 3+0 | 0 | 0+0 | 0 |
| 16 | MF | (Scotland) SCO | Barry Ferguson | 45 | 1 | 40+2 | 1 | 3+0 | 0 | 0+0 | 0 | 0+0 | 0 |
| 17 | MF | (England) ENG | Chris Basham | 21 | 2 | 8+9 | 2 | 0+0 | 0 | 3+0 | 0 | 1+0 | 0 |
| 18 | DF | (England) ENG | Matt Hill | 5 | 0 | 4+0 | 0 | 0+0 | 0 | 0+0 | 0 | 1+0 | 0 |
| 19 | MF | (Scotland) SCO | Stephen Husband | 0 | 0 | 0+0 | 0 | 0+0 | 0 | 0+0 | 0 | 0+0 | 0 |
| 20 | DF | (Northern Ireland) NIR | Craig Cathcart | 29 | 0 | 27+0 | 0 | 0+0 | 0 | 2+0 | 0 | 0+0 | 0 |
| 21 | GK | (England) ENG | Mark Halstead | 1 | 0 | 0+0 | 0 | 0+0 | 0 | 0+0 | 0 | 1+0 | 0 |
| 22 | DF | (England) ENG | Ashley Eastham | 1 | 0 | 0+0 | 0 | 0+0 | 0 | 0+0 | 0 | 1+0 | 0 |
| 23 | MF | (England) ENG | Matt Phillips | 39 | 12 | 25+8 | 7 | 3+0 | 1 | 3+0 | 4 | 0+0 | 0 |
| 24 | FW | (Scotland) SCO | Craig Sutherland | 7 | 0 | 2+4 | 0 | 0+0 | 0 | 0+0 | 0 | 1+0 | 0 |
| 25 | DF | (Spain) ESP | Miguel Llera | 1 | 0 | 0+0 | 0 | 0+0 | 0 | 0+0 | 0 | 0+1 | 0 |
| 25 | MF | (Scotland) SCO | John Fleck | 9 | 0 | 4+4 | 0 | 0+0 | 0 | 0+1 | 0 | 0+0 | 0 |
| 26 | MF | (England) ENG | Liam Tomsett | 0 | 0 | 0+0 | 0 | 0+0 | 0 | 0+0 | 0 | 0+0 | 0 |
| 27 | FW | (England) ENG | Thomas Barkhuizen | 1 | 0 | 0+0 | 0 | 0+0 | 0 | 0+0 | 0 | 0+1 | 0 |
| 28 | MF | (England) ENG | Adam Dodd | 0 | 0 | 0+0 | 0 | 0+0 | 0 | 0+0 | 0 | 0+0 | 0 |
| 29 | GK | (England) ENG | Mark Howard | 5 | 0 | 4+0 | 0 | 0+0 | 0 | 1+0 | 0 | 0+0 | 0 |
| 31 | MF | (Spain) ESP | Ángel Martínez | 23 | 1 | 10+5 | 1 | 3+0 | 0 | 4+0 | 0 | 1+0 | 0 |
| 32 | MF | (France) FRA | Nouha Dicko | 16 | 4 | 4+6 | 4 | 0+3 | 0 | 0+3 | 0 | 0+0 | 0 |
| 33 | DF | (Scotland) SCO | Bob Harris | 10 | 0 | 4+1 | 0 | 0+0 | 0 | 4+0 | 0 | 1+0 | 0 |
| 34 | GK | (Scotland) SCO | Chris Kettings | 0 | 0 | 0+0 | 0 | 0+0 | 0 | 0+0 | 0 | 0+0 | 0 |
| 35 | DF | (England) ENG | James Hurst | 2 | 0 | 0+2 | 0 | 0+0 | 0 | 0+0 | 0 | 0+0 | 0 |
| 35 | FW | (Czech Republic) CZE | Roman Bednář | 11 | 1 | 3+6 | 1 | 0+1 | 0 | 0+1 | 0 | 0+0 | 0 |
| 36 | MF | (England) ENG | Tom Ince | 41 | 7 | 21+11 | 6 | 3+1 | 0 | 3+1 | 1 | 1+0 | 0 |
| 37 | MF | (England) ENG | Jonjo Shelvey | 10 | 6 | 10+0 | 6 | 0+0 | 0 | 0+0 | 0 | 0+0 | 0 |
| 37 | DF | (Scotland) SCO | Danny Wilson | 11 | 0 | 7+0 | 0 | 0+0 | 0 | 4+0 | 0 | 0+0 | 0 |
| 38 | FW | (Democratic Republic of the Congo) COD | Lomana LuaLua | 32 | 6 | 18+11 | 4 | 0+0 | 0 | 2+1 | 2 | 0+0 | 0 |
| 39 | FW | (England) ENG | Callum McManaman | 14 | 2 | 9+5 | 2 | 0+0 | 0 | 0+0 | 0 | 0+0 | 0 |

Players used: 37
Goals scored: 92 (79 League; 4 play-offs; 9 FA Cup) (includes two own goals)

== Transfers ==
=== In ===
| Date | Player | From | Fee | Ref. |
|---|---|---|---|---|
| 29 June 2011 | Bojan Djordjic | Videoton | Free | |
| 9 July 2011 | Matt Hill | | Free | |
| 9 July 2011 | Kevin Phillips | | Free | |
| 18 July 2011 | Gerardo Bruna | Liverpool | Undisclosed | |
| 22 July 2011 | Barry Ferguson | Birmingham City | £750,000 | |
| 22 July 2011 | Robert Harris | Queen of the South | Free | |
| 22 July 2011 | Paul Bignot | Newport County | Undisclosed | |
| 26 July 2011 | Ángel Martínez | Espanyol | Undisclosed | |
| 26 July 2011 | Craig Sutherland | North Carolina State Wolfpack | Undisclosed | |
| 3 August 2011 | Tom Ince | Liverpool | Undisclosed | |
| 4 August 2011 | Miguel Llera | Charlton Athletic | Free | |
| 31 August 2011 | Daniel Bogdanović | Sheffield United | £250,000 | |
| 27 September 2011 | Mark Howard | Aberdeen | Free | |
| 13 October 2011 | Lomana LuaLua | | Free | |
| 28 January 2012 | Roman Bednář | West Bromwich Albion | Free | |

=== Loans in ===
| Date | Player | From | Duration | Ref. |
|---|---|---|---|---|
| 31 August 2011 | James Hurst | West Bromwich Albion | Season-long loan (recalled in October) | |
| 29 September 2011 | Jonjo Shelvey | Liverpool | Recalled in November | |
| 17 October 2011 | Callum McManaman | Wigan Athletic | | |
| 31 December 2011 | Danny Wilson | Liverpool | Season-long loan | |
| 19 January 2012 | John Fleck | Rangers | Until end of season | |
| 27 January 2012 | Nouha Dicko | Wigan Athletic | | |
| 22 March 2012 | Stephen Dobbie | Swansea City | Until end of season | |

=== Out ===
| Date | Player | To | Fee | Ref. |
|---|---|---|---|---|
| 30 May 2011 | Paul Rachubka | | Free | |
| 30 May 2011 | Richard Kingson | | Free | |
| 30 May 2011 | Rob Edwards | | Free | |
| 30 May 2011 | Danny Coid | | Free | |
| 30 May 2011 | Malaury Martin | | Free | |
| 30 May 2011 | Marlon Harewood | | Free | |
| 30 May 2011 | Jason Euell | | Free | |
| 30 May 2011 | David Carney | | Free | |
| 30 May 2011 | Andy Reid | | Free | |
| 30 May 2011 | Salaheddine Sbai | | Free | |
| 30 May 2011 | Ishmel Demontagnac | | Free | |
| 13 June 2011 | David Vaughan | | Free | |
| 7 July 2011 | Charlie Adam | Liverpool | £7,000,000 | |
| 4 August 2011 | D. J. Campbell | Queens Park Rangers | £1,250,000 | |
| | Josh Egan | Bath City | Unknown | |
| 9 January 2012 | Bojan Djordjic | | Contract terminated | |
| 10 January 2012 | Miguel Llera | Sheffield Wednesday | Free | |
| 31 January 2012 | Billy Clarke | Crawley Town | Undisclosed | |

=== Loans out ===
| Date from | Player | To | Duration | Ref. |
|---|---|---|---|---|
| 4 August 2011 | Louis Almond | Barrow | | |
| 25 August 2011 | Ashley Eastham | Bury | Six-month loan | |
| 26 August 2011 | Tom Barkhuizen | Hereford United | Until end of season | |
| 8 September 2011 | Miguel Llera | Brentford | Three-month loan | |
| 14 October 2011 | Billy Clarke | Sheffield United | One-month loan | |
| 14 October 2011 | Matt Phillips | Sheffield United | One-month loan | |
| 4 November 2011 | Paul Bignot | Plymouth Argyle | Three-month loan | |
| 11 November 2011 | Mark Halstead | Stockport County | Three-month loan | |
| 16 November 2011 | Craig Sutherland | Plymouth Argyle | Until 28 January | |
| 22 November 2011 | Miguel Llera | Sheffield Wednesday | | |
| | Chris Kettings | Woodley Sports | | |
| 2 January 2012 | Daniel Bogdanovic | Rochdale | | |
| 3 January 2012 | Brett Ormerod | Rochdale | One-month loan | |
| | Adam Dodd | Ayr United | | |
| | Liam Tomsett | Ayr United | | |
| 28 January 2012 | Elliot Grandin | Nice | | |
| | Louis Almond | Lincoln City | | |
| | Chris Kettings | Morecambe | | |
| | Matt Hill | Sheffield United | | |

== Notes ==
- ^1 Entered competition in third round
