= Chris Kettings =

Scottish footballer

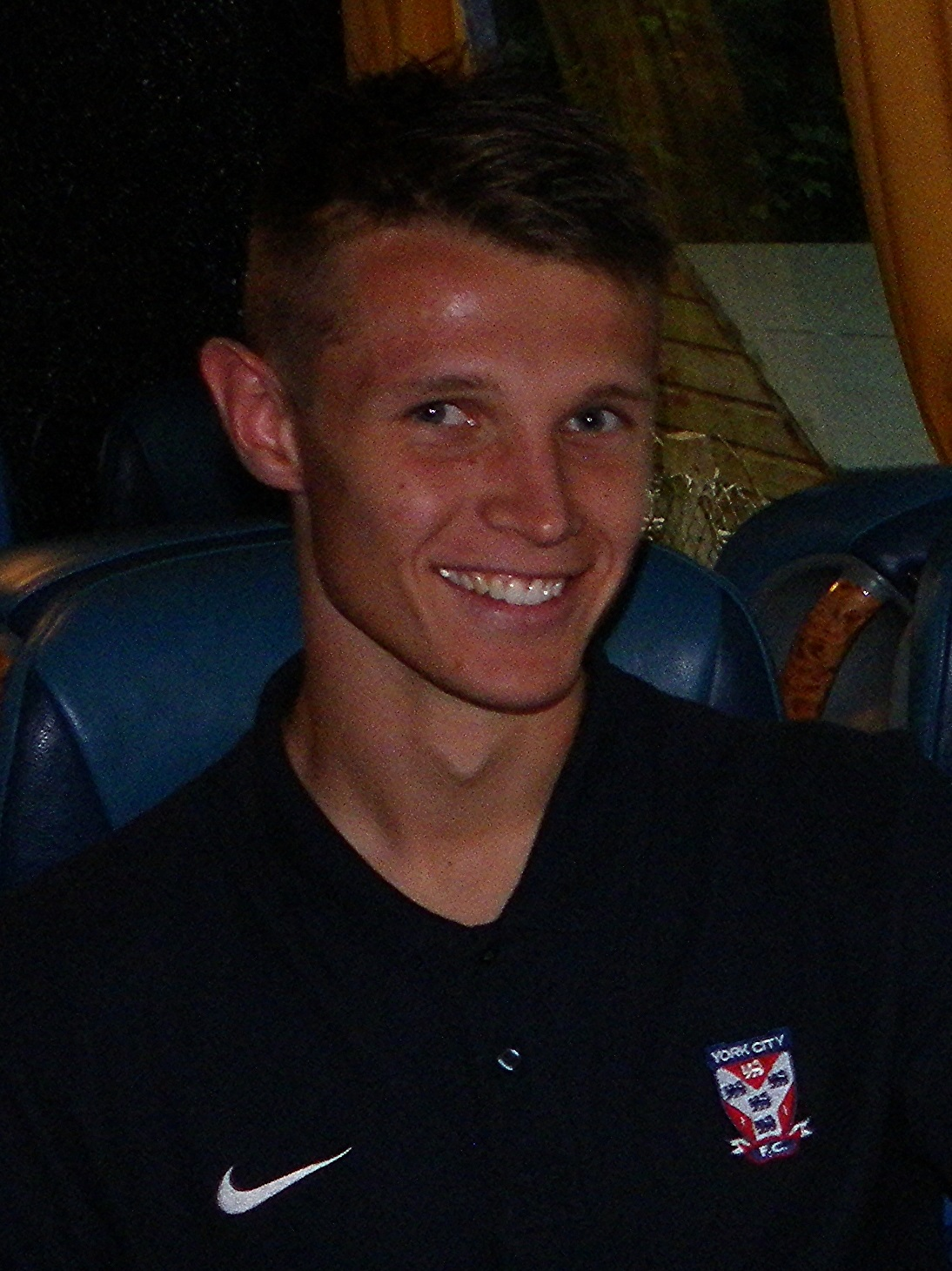
- Kettings with York City in 2013

Personal information
- Full name: Christopher David Kettings
- Date of birth: 25 October 1992 (age 34)
- Place of birth: Glasgow, Scotland
- Height: 6 ft 4 in (1.93 m)
- Position: Goalkeeper

Youth career
- –2007: Manchester City
- 2007–2011: Blackpool

Senior career*
Years	Team	Apps	(Gls)
2011–2014	Blackpool	0	(0)
2011	→ Birmingham City (loan)	0	(0)
2011	→ Woodley Sports (loan)		
2012	→ Morecambe (loan)	2	(0)
2013–2014	→ York City (loan)	0	(0)
2014	→ Hyde (loan)	17	(0)
2014–2016	Crystal Palace	0	(0)
2015	→ Stevenage (loan)	0	(0)
2015	→ Bromley (loan)	14	(0)
2016–2017	Oldham Athletic	0	(0)
Total		33	(0)

International career
2010	Scotland U19	2	(0)
2012–2014	Scotland U21	3	(0)
- * Club domestic league appearances and goals as of 18:12, 9 July 2017 (UTC)

Christopher David Kettings (born 25 October 1992) is a Scottish former professional footballer who played as a goalkeeper.

Kettings started his career with Manchester City in their Centre of Excellence before joining Blackpool in 2007, and signed a two-year scholarship in 2009 after serving two years in their Centre of Excellence. He signed a professional contract with the club in 2011 and was subsequently loaned out to Birmingham City, Woodley Sports, Morecambe, York City and Hyde. Kettings was released by Blackpool in May 2014 and signed for Crystal Palace a month later. He was with Palace for two years, having loan spells with Stevenage and Bromley before being released in June 2016 and joining Oldham Athletic a month later.

== Club career ==
=== Blackpool ===
Born in Glasgow, Kettings started his career with Manchester City's Centre of Excellence before joining Blackpool in 2007. He was a member of the Greater Manchester under-16 squad which won the English counties national championship in April 2009, playing in the final and defeating Essex at The Den. After two years with Blackpool's Centre of Excellence he signed a two-year scholarship with the youth team in May 2009. Kettings was added to Blackpool's Premier League squad in February 2011 and his first involvement with the first team came as an unused substitute in a 1–1 home draw against Aston Villa on 12 February. After his two-year scholarship he signed his first professional contract in June 2011, following Blackpool's relegation to the Championship.

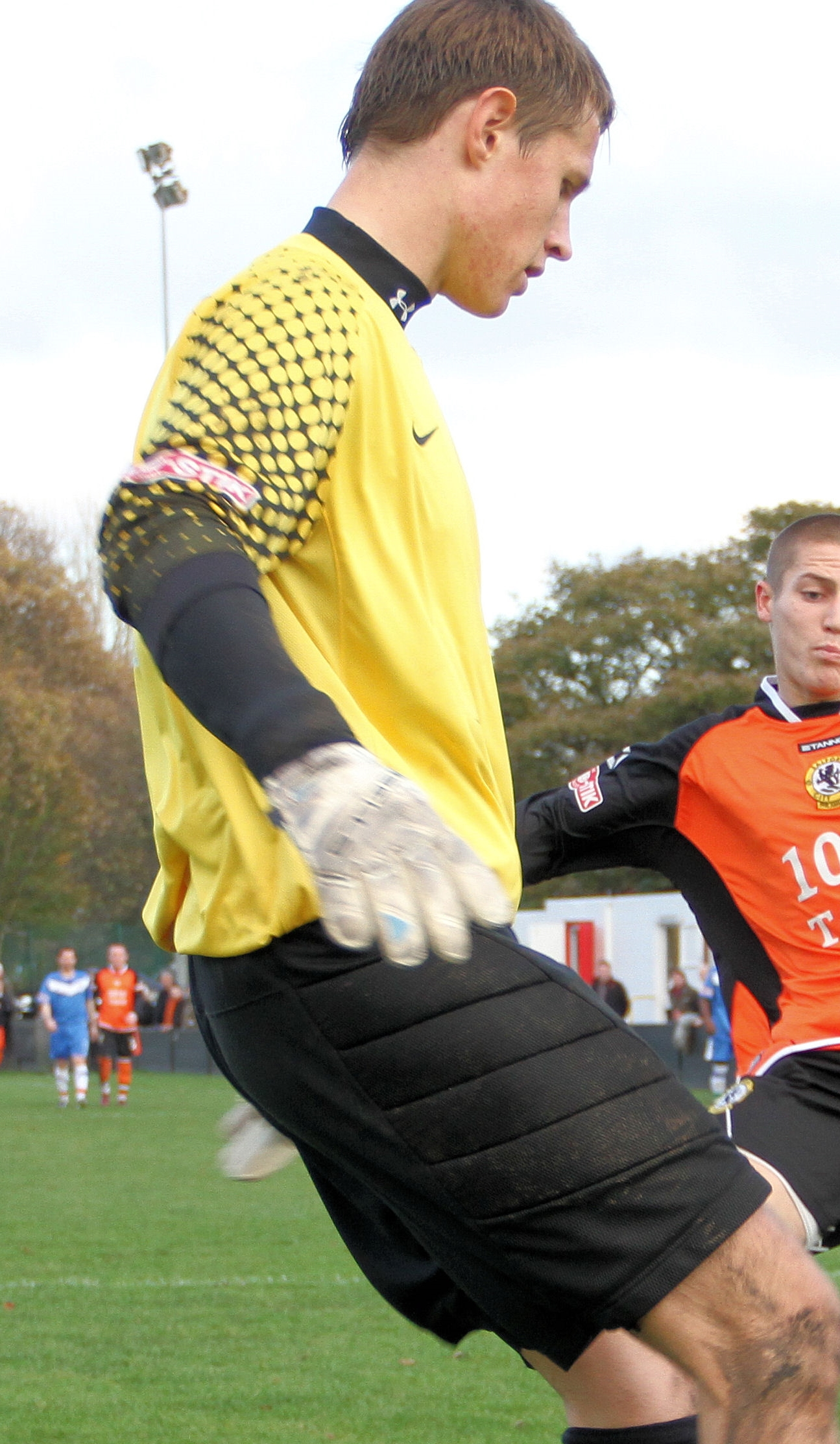
Kettings playing for Woodley Sports in 2011

He joined Championship rivals Birmingham City on loan on 26 August 2011, playing in all five under-18 league matches during his spell before he returned to Blackpool on 1 October 2011. Kettings then joined Northern Premier League Division One North club Woodley Sports on loan in November 2011. He made his debut on 12 November 2011 in a 3–0 defeat away to Salford City. On 23 January 2012, he joined League Two club Morecambe on loan for the rest of the 2011–12 season. He made his debut on 11 February in a 2–1 defeat away to Bristol Rovers, with his home debut coming three days later in a 1–0 victory over Macclesfield Town. These proved to be his only appearances for Morecambe, meaning he finished the loan with two appearances.

Kettings joined League Two club York City on 13 June 2013 on a season-long loan. He made his debut after Michael Ingham picked up an injury during the warm-up prior to York's 3–2 defeat at home to Bristol Rovers in an FA Cup first round replay on 19 November 2013. Nick Pope was signed on loan by York to cover for Ingham, with Kettings then deciding to return to Blackpool on his own accord, although his loan agreement would stay in place until 5 January 2014. He joined Conference Premier club Hyde on loan for the rest of 2013–14 on 24 January 2014, and made his debut a day later in a 3–0 home defeat to Tamworth.

=== Crystal Palace ===
Kettings was released by Blackpool in May 2014 before signing for Premier League club Crystal Palace on 19 June on a two-year contract, to provide competition for Julián Speroni and Wayne Hennessey.

Kettings joined Stevenage on 14 August 2015 on a one-month loan, but did not make any appearances for the League Two club. He joined National League team Bromley on an emergency loan on 18 September 2015. In December 2015, Kettings returned to Palace through injury.

On 13 June 2016, it was announced that Kettings would be released by Crystal Palace on expiry of his contract on 30 June.

=== Oldham Athletic ===
On 12 July 2016, Kettings joined League One club Oldham Athletic on a one-year contract. He turned down a new contract at the end of 2016–17.

== International career ==
Kettings has represented Scotland at under-19 level, playing twice against Malta in 2010. On 29 August 2012 he was called up to the under-21 squad for their 2013 UEFA European Under-21 Championship qualification Group 10 games against Luxembourg on 6 September and Austria on 10 September, but did not play in either game. He made his under-21 debut in a 2–0 win against Canada in a friendly on 16 October 2012.

== Personal life ==
Kettings has a degree from the Open University in Business and Accounting. He graduated in 2015 with a 2:1.

As of September 2017, Kettings works as an Area Manager for Aldi.

== Career statistics ==
As of match played 30 April 2017

Appearances and goals by club, season and competition
Club	Season	League			FA Cup		League Cup		Other		Total	
Club	Season	Division	Apps	Goals	Apps	Goals	Apps	Goals	Apps	Goals	Apps	Goals
Blackpool	2010–11	Premier League	0	0	0	0	0	0	—		0	0
Blackpool	2011–12	Championship	0	0	0	0	0	0	0	0	0	0
Blackpool	2012–13	Championship	0	0	0	0	0	0	—		0	0
Blackpool	2013–14	Championship	0	0	—		—		—		0	0
Blackpool	Total		0	0	0	0	0	0	0	0	0	0
Morecambe (loan)	2011–12	League Two	2	0	0	0	0	0	0	0	2	0
York City (loan)	2013–14	League Two	0	0	1	0	0	0	0	0	1	0
Hyde (loan)	2013–14	Conference Premier	17	0	—		—		—		17	0
Crystal Palace	2014–15	Premier League	0	0	0	0	0	0	—		0	0
Crystal Palace	2015–16	Premier League	0	0	—		0	0	—		0	0
Crystal Palace	Total		0	0	0	0	0	0	—		0	0
Stevenage (loan)	2015–16	League Two	0	0	—		—		—		0	0
Bromley (loan)	2015–16	National League	14	0	1	0	—		0	0	15	0
Oldham Athletic	2016–17	League One	0	0	0	0	0	0	1 (Note: Appearance in EFL Trophy)	0	1	0
Career total			33	0	2	0	0	0	1	0	36	0
