= Craig Sutherland =

Scottish footballer (born 1988)

Personal information
- Full name: Craig Stephen Sutherland
- Date of birth: 17 December 1988 (age 37)
- Place of birth: Edinburgh, Scotland
- Position: Forward

Youth career
- 2006–2007: Spartans
- 2007–2009: Midwestern State University
- 2010: North Carolina State University

Senior career*
Years	Team	Apps	(Gls)
2011–2013	Blackpool	1	(0)
2011–2012	→ Plymouth Argyle (loan)	9	(1)
2013	Woking	0	(0)
2014	Queen's Park	4	(0)
2014–2015	Cowdenbeath	12	(1)
2015	Stenhousemuir	7	(1)
2015	East Fife	5	(1)
Total		44	(4)
- * Club domestic league appearances and goals

Craig Stephen Sutherland (born 17 December 1988) is a Scottish former professional footballer who played as a forward. He began his career in the United States playing college soccer for Midwestern State University and North Carolina State University. Sutherland played 16 times in the Football League for Blackpool and Plymouth Argyle between 2011 and 2012. He has also played for Woking, Queen's Park, Cowdenbeath, Stenhousemuir and East Fife.

== Career ==
Sutherland played for Spartans at youth level between 2006 and 2007 before moving to the United States to begin a soccer scholarship in Texas.

Sutherland joined Blackpool on 26 July 2011 from North Carolina State University. He made his debut on 5 August as a substitute in Blackpool's single-goal Championship victory at Hull City in the opening game of the 2011–12 Football League season. His first start came six days later, in the first round of the League Cup against Sheffield Wednesday at Hillsborough.

On 16 November he joined League Two side Plymouth Argyle on loan for two months, joining teammate Paul Bignot, who had also signed on loan two weeks earlier. His made his debut three days later in a 3–1 defeat away to Torquay United.

He went close to scoring his first senior goal in his third appearance for the Pilgrims, in a 1–1 draw with Bradford City at Valley Parade on 10 December. A shot from Simon Walton took a deflection in the crowded penalty area and Sutherland was credited with the goal by the Press Association, however the deflection actually came off a Bradford defender. "Craig said he didn't touch it. It might have been one of the defenders, but, as far as I understand it, it's only an own goal if it is not on target, and it was going in," said Walton. "Craig said, while we were celebrating, 'It's your goal' so I'll take it." The goal remained credited to Sutherland at the end of the season.

Sutherland returned to Blackpool at the end of January 2012, having made nine appearances for Argyle. He was released at the end of the 2012–13 season without making another first team appearance.

Sutherland then spent time on trial at Rangers before signing for Woking. In March 2014, Sutherland went on trial at Dundee. After registration issues stopped him joining Dundee, he signed for Scottish League Two club Queen's Park until the end of the 2013–14 season.

On 25 July 2014, Sutherland signed for Scottish Championship club Cowdenbeath.

On 23 January 2015, Sutherland joined Stenhousemuir, signing a contract until the end of the 2014–15 season. He was released by the club at the end of the season.

Sutherland then signed for East Fife on 23 July 2015, making eight appearances before leaving the club in October 2015.

== Personal life ==
Sutherland was born in Edinburgh. After attending George Watson's College in Edinburgh, he moved to the United States in 2007 to begin a soccer scholarship at Midwestern State University. He played for Great Britain in the 2009 Summer Universiade football tournament, held in Serbia. In the opening group game he scored a late equaliser in a 2–2 draw with Mexico at the Omladinski Stadium, Belgrade. After two years at Midwestern he then moved to North Carolina State University, where he played for a further two years.

== Career statistics ==
Appearances and goals by club, season and competition
Club	Season	League			National Cup		League Cup		Other		Total	
Club	Season	Division	Apps	Goals	Apps	Goals	Apps	Goals	App	Goals	Apps	Goals
Blackpool	2011–12	Championship	7	0	0	0	1	0	0	0	8	0
Plymouth Argyle (loan)	2011–12	League Two	9	1	0	0	0	0	0	0	9	1
Queen's Park	2013–14	Scottish League Two	4	0	0	0	0	0	0	0	4	0
Cowdenbeath	2014–15	Scottish Championship	12	1	1	0	0	0	1 (Note: Appearances in the Scottish League Challenge Cup)	0	14	1
Stenhousemuir	2014–15	Scottish League One	7	1	0	0	0	0	1 (Note: Appearance in the Scottish League One play-offs)	1	8	2
East Fife	2015–16	Scottish League Two	5	1	0	0	2	0	1	0	8	1
Career total			44	4	1	0	3	0	3	1	51	5
