= Matt Phillips =

Scottish footballer (born 1991)

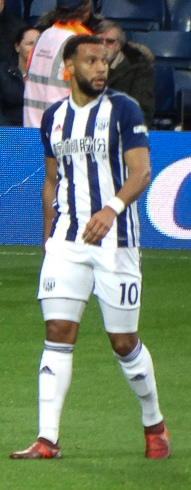
- Phillips playing for West Bromwich Albion in 2017

Personal information
- Full name: Matthew Phillips
- Date of birth: 13 March 1991 (age 35)
- Place of birth: Aylesbury, England
- Height: 6 ft 1 in (1.85 m)
- Positions: Winger; forward; left wing-back

Youth career
- 1999–2008: Wycombe Wanderers

Senior career*
Years	Team	Apps	(Gls)
2008–2010	Wycombe Wanderers	78	(8)
2010–2013	Blackpool	94	(12)
2011	→ Sheffield United (loan)	6	(5)
2013–2016	Queens Park Rangers	90	(14)
2016–2024	West Bromwich Albion	238	(28)
2024–2026	Oxford United	36	(0)
2026	Stevenage	16	(2)

International career^{‡}
2010	England U19	5	(2)
2011	England U20	5	(0)
2012–2019	Scotland	16	(1)
- * Club domestic league appearances and goals as of 31 January 2026 ‡ National team caps and goals as of 9 September 2019

Matthew Phillips (born 13 March 1991) is a professional footballer. He can play as a winger, forward or left wing-back.

Born in Aylesbury, Buckinghamshire, to a Jamaican-born father of Barbadian descent and a Scottish mother, Phillips began his career at Wycombe Wanderers before a move to Blackpool, spending a spell on loan at Sheffield United. In 2013 he moved to Queens Park Rangers and in 2016 he signed for West Bromwich Albion, where he played for eight seasons before signing for Oxford United in 2024.

He represented England at under-19 and under-20 level but has subsequently represented Scotland at senior level.

== Club career ==
=== Wycombe Wanderers ===
Phillips signed for Wycombe Wanderers at the age of eight when he was spotted playing in a five-a-side tournament. Having progressed through Wycombe's junior sides, he made his first team debut as an 82nd-minute substitute, a month after his seventeenth birthday, on 26 April 2008 in a 1–0 defeat to Notts County, the penultimate game of the 2007–08 season. His first start came a week later in the 2–1 win over Bradford City at Adams Park, in which he was voted man of the match by the Wycombe supporters.

After breaking into the first team during the previous season, Phillips signed his first professional contract in July 2008, a year before the end of his youth team scholarship. His first goal for the Chairboys came on 10 November 2008 in the 4–1 away win over AFC Wimbledon in the First round of the 2008–09 FA Cup. His first league goal came on 6 December in the 3–2 away defeat to Aldershot Town.

Phillips went on to make a massive contribution to the Chairboys promotion from League Two in the 2008–09 season, becoming a regular on either the left or right wing, impressing with his ability to take on defenders and to cut inside. He was also won the club's two "Young Player of the Year" awards at the end of the season as well as the League Two "Apprentice of the Year". Phillips was given the number 18 shirt for the 2009–10 season and continued his good form from the previous season, playing on either flank. In total, Phillips made 87 league and cup appearances for Wycombe, scoring nine goals.

=== Blackpool ===
Phillips signed for Premier League club Blackpool on 31 August 2010 in an original £350,000 deal, rising to £700,000 for achieving specific criteria. Manager Ian Holloway stated that he had been tracking Phillips for "a long time", saying of him, "Young Matty looked really exciting at times. He was skipping past people like they weren't there and now I've got to get him in our shape and working within it. He is definitely one for not only the long-term future but the immediate future. I am getting quite excited about what he might be able to produce."

Phillips' first team debut came on 25 September in the 2–1 home defeat to Blackburn Rovers. Phillips came on as a substitute in the 84th minute, making an instant impact, scoring his first ever Premier League goal just seconds later. After the match Ian Holloway praised Phillips saying, "I thought he was terrific. He's only 19 and he's someone who I think will have a good future. He played in a different role and smacked one in like that. Hopefully there is a lot, lot more to come from that boy because he has got some bits and pieces that would grace any level of football." Of his debut and goal Phillips said: "I've dreamt of playing in the Premier League since I was a kid, so to play Premier League football is one thing, but to go out there and make a mark on it is another, so I'm delighted." He made his full-debut against Aston Villa at Villa Park, a performance which led manager Ian Holloway to describe him as "at times un-markable".

After a successful spell on loan at Sheffield United, Phillips scored a hat-trick in Blackpool's Boxing Day 3–1 victory at Barnsley. He scored another hat-trick two weeks later, this time against Fleetwood Town in the FA Cup third round. Later that month Blackpool rejected a bid from Cardiff City, believed to be around £800,000, for the winger.

In the week before the start of the 2012–13 season Blackpool rejected a £5 million bid for Phillips from newly promoted Premier League side Southampton. He then put in a transfer request, and after being left out of the opening day victory over Millwall on 18 August, he returned to action three days later, scoring the winning goal in a 2–1 home victory over Leeds United.

==== Sheffield United (loan) ====
With first-team opportunities proving limited, Phillips agreed a months loan to Sheffield United in October 2011, making his début in the Steel City Derby a few days later. Phillips had a major impact in his month spell, scoring six goals in six appearances for the South Yorkshire club before returning to Bloomfield Road.

=== Queens Park Rangers ===
On 23 August 2013, Phillips signed for Queens Park Rangers on a four-year deal for an undisclosed fee and was handed the number 7 shirt. He made his debut for the club on 14 September, coming on as a first-half substitute for Junior Hoilett against Birmingham City. He scored his first goal for Queens Park Rangers on 3 December, netting the final goal in a 3–0 win over Bournemouth. His second goal for the club came eleven days later, when he scored the first in a 2–0 win over his former club Blackpool. His third goal was an equaliser against Doncaster Rovers in a league match at Loftus Road which QPR went on to win 2–1. Phillips suffered a broken leg against Burnley on 1 February 2014 which ruled him out for the remainder of the season, however QPR won promotion in the 2014 Championship play-off final against Derby County.

Phillips was fit again for QPR's first game back in the Premier League, a 1–0 loss at home to Hull City. He struggled for game time initially but played almost every minute in the league after the resignation of Harry Redknapp on 3 February 2015. On 14 March, Phillips scored "a goal of the season contender" from 40 yards out in a 3–1 loss at Crystal Palace.

=== West Bromwich Albion ===
On 6 July 2016, Phillips joined Premier League side West Bromwich Albion on a four-year deal. Phillips got his first league goal in a win against reigning Premier League Champions Leicester City. He finished the game with an assist and the winning goal in the 2–1 win. Phillips continued his goal scoring exploits in the next game against Burnley F.C. He opened the scoring in the fourth minute and also set up a goal for Albion captain Darren Fletcher, helping the team to establish a 3–0 first half lead, in a game which ended as a 4–0 win. On 31 December he scored and set up Hal Robson-Kanu's first Albion goal in a 2–1 win over Southampton. He set up more goals for Chris Brunt and Gareth McAuley in a 3–1 win over Hull which took his tally up to 8 assists for the season.

On 5 August 2021, Phillips signed a contract extension until the summer of 2024. On 22 May 2024, the club announced he would be leaving in the summer when his contract expired.

=== Oxford United ===
On 1 August 2024, Phillips signed for newly promoted Championship club Oxford United on a free transfer. On 13 August, Phillips made his debut for the club, as well as scoring his first goal, in a 2–0 win against Peterborough United in the EFL Cup.

On 2 February 2026, Phillips left Oxford by mutual consent.

=== Stevenage ===
On 13 February 2026, Phillips signed for Stevenage for the remainder of the season. On 18 May 2026, Phillips leaving Stevenage was announced.

== International career ==
In May 2010, after initially being named as a standby, Phillips was called into the England under-19 squad for their upcoming European Championship Elite qualifying round matches. On 26 May he made his debut against the Republic of Ireland, coming on as a 76th-minute substitute for Jacob Mellis. Two days later he made his full debut and scored his first international goal in his next game against Bosnia and Herzegovina. In July 2010 Phillips was named in England's 18-man squad for the European Under-19 Championship. He scored a final-minute equaliser against France to send England through to the semi-finals of the tournament.

In February 2011, Phillips made his debut for the England under-20s in a 2–1 defeat to France. In June 2011, he was named in England's 21-man squad for the Under-20 World Cup. He started all three of England's group stage games plus their final-16 game, a 1–0 loss to Nigeria.

In January 2012, it was suggested that Scotland manager Craig Levein had been monitoring Phillips' progress, due to his eligibility through Phillips' Scottish grandparents. In February 2012, Levein duly called Phillips up to the Scotland squad to face Slovenia in a friendly; however, Phillips had to withdraw after suffering a hamstring injury.

Phillips finally made his Scotland debut in a 5–1 friendly loss to the United States on 26 May 2012 at EverBank Field, Jacksonville, Florida. He made his next appearance for Scotland on 16 October 2012 in a World Cup qualifier, coming on as a substitute in the 79th minute in a 2–0 defeat away against Belgium.

In March 2018 Phillips scored his first and only Scotland goal, a second-half strike in a friendly match away to Hungary to win the tie 1–0.

== Career statistics ==
=== Club ===
As of match played 7 March 2025

Appearances and goals by club, season and competition
Club	Season	League			FA Cup		League Cup		Other		Total	
Club	Season	Division	Apps	Goals	Apps	Goals	Apps	Goals	Apps	Goals	Apps	Goals
Wycombe Wanderers	2007–08	League Two	2	0	0	0	0	0	1 (Note: Appearance in League Two play-offs)	0	3	0
Wycombe Wanderers	2008–09	League Two	37	3	2	1	0	0	1 (Note: Appearance in Football League Trophy)	0	40	4
Wycombe Wanderers	2009–10	League One	36	5	2	0	1	0	1	0	40	5
Wycombe Wanderers	2010–11	League Two	3	0	—		1	0	—		4	0
Wycombe Wanderers	Total		78	8	4	1	2	0	3	0	87	9
Blackpool	2010–11	Premier League	27	1	1	0	—		—		28	1
Blackpool	2011–12	Championship	33	7	3	4	0	0	3 (Note: Appearances in Championship play-offs)	1	39	12
Blackpool	2012–13	Championship	34	4	0	0	1	0	—		35	4
Blackpool	Total		94	12	4	4	1	0	3	1	102	17
Sheffield United (loan)	2011–12	League One	6	5	—		—		1	1	7	6
Queens Park Rangers	2013–14	Championship	21	3	1	0	0	0	0	0	22	3
Queens Park Rangers	2014–15	Premier League	25	3	1	0	1	0	—		27	3
Queens Park Rangers	2015–16	Championship	44	8	0	0	1	0	—		45	8
Queens Park Rangers	Total		90	14	2	0	2	0	0	0	94	14
West Bromwich Albion	2016–17	Premier League	27	4	1	1	1	0	—		29	5
West Bromwich Albion	2017–18	Premier League	30	2	2	0	2	1	—		34	3
West Bromwich Albion	2018–19	Championship	30	5	0	0	1	0	2 (Note: Appearances in Championship play-offs)	0	33	5
West Bromwich Albion	2019–20	Championship	39	7	2	1	0	0	—		41	8
West Bromwich Albion	2020–21	Premier League	33	2	0	0	2	0	—		35	2
West Bromwich Albion	2021–22	Championship	28	3	1	0	0	0	—		29	3
West Bromwich Albion	2022–23	Championship	25	2	1	0	2	0	—		28	2
West Bromwich Albion	2023–24	Championship	26	3	0	0	0	0	0 (Note: Appearances in Championship play-offs)	0	26	3
West Bromwich Albion	Total		238	28	7	2	8	1	2	0	255	31
Oxford United	2024–25	Championship	22	0	1	1	1	1	—		24	2
Career total			528	67	18	8	14	2	9	2	569	79

=== International ===
As of match played 9 September 2019

Appearances and goals by national team and year
National team	Year	Apps	Goals
Scotland	2012	2	0
Scotland	2016	2	0
Scotland	2017	5	0
Scotland	2018	5	1
Scotland	2019	2	0
Total		16	1

=== International goals ===
As of match played 27 March 2018. Scotland score listed first, score column indicates score after each Phillips goal.

International goals by date, venue, cap, opponent, score, result and competition
No.	Date	Venue	Cap	Opponent	Score	Result	Competition
1	27 March 2018	Groupama Arena, Budapest, Hungary	11	Hungary	1–0	1–0	Friendly

== Honours ==
Individual

- PFA Team of the Year: 2011–12 Championship

== See also ==
- List of Scotland international footballers born outside Scotland
- List of sportspeople who competed for more than one nation
