= Ludovic Sylvestre =

French footballer (born 1984)

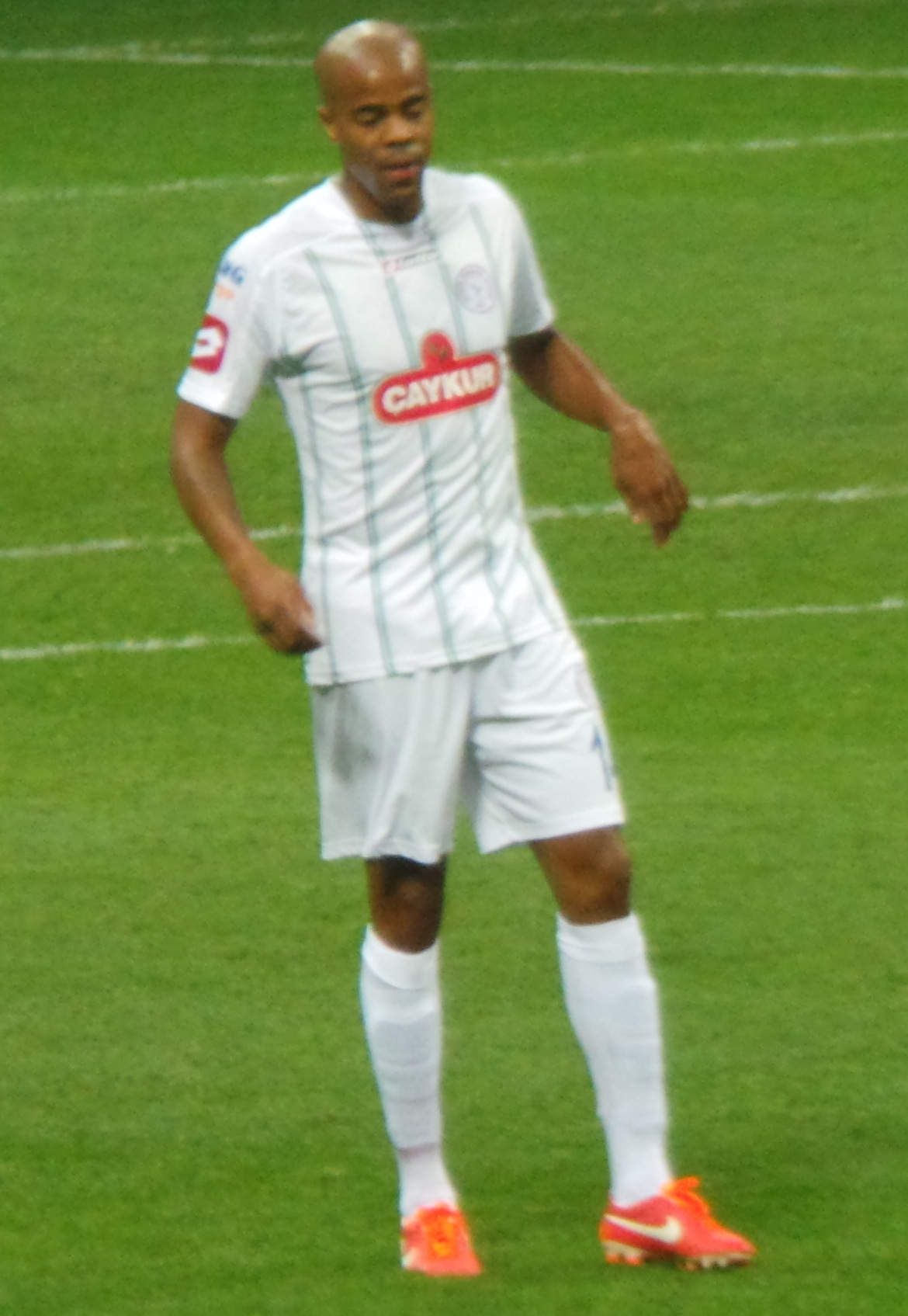
- Sylvestre playing for Çaykur Rizespor in 2013

Personal information
- Full name: Ludovic Sylvestre
- Date of birth: 5 February 1984 (age 42)
- Place of birth: Le Blanc-Mesnil, France
- Height: 1.83 m (6 ft 0 in)
- Position: Midfielder

Team information
- Current team: Red Star (sporting director)

Youth career
- ?–2000: Clairefontaine
- 2001–2003: Guingamp
- 2003–2005: Strasbourg

Senior career*
Years	Team	Apps	(Gls)
2005–2006	Barcelona B	20	(0)
2006	Barcelona	2	(0)
2006–2008	Sparta Prague	25	(0)
2008	→ Viktoria Plzeň (loan)	14	(3)
2008–2010	Mladá Boleslav	60	(12)
2010–2013	Blackpool	65	(6)
2013–2016	Çaykur Rizespor	88	(2)
2016–2018	Red Star	44	(2)
Total		318	(25)
- * Club domestic league appearances and goals

Ludovic Sylvestre (born 5 February 1984) is a French former professional footballer who played as a midfielder. He is the sporting director at Red Star.

== Career ==
=== Youth career ===
Born in the commune of Le Blanc-Mesnil in Seine-Saint-Denis, as a youth, Sylvestre spent time at Clairefontaine football academy until 2000, Guingamp and then Strasbourg.

=== Barcelona ===
In 2005, he was signed by La Liga side Barcelona. Playing for B teams he made just two league appearances for Barça. His debut came on 13 May 2006 as a 64th-minute substitute in a 3–2 away defeat to Sevilla. His full debut, seven days later, was also his last appearance for the club, a 3–1 away defeat to Athletic Bilbao.

=== Sparta Prague ===
In 2006 Sylvestre moved to Czech First League side Sparta Prague. His debut came on 29 July 2006 in a 0–0 home draw with Kladno. His European debut came on 14 September in a 2–0 win away to Scottish Premier League side Hearts in the First round of the 2006–07 UEFA Cup. He went on to make a total on 19 appearances in the 2006–07 season as Sparta won the league.

He started the 2007–08 season with Sparta Prague, making six appearances, before joining Viktoria Plzeň on loan in early 2008. He scored on his debut, a 2–0 home win over 1 FC Brno. He went on to make a total of 14 appearances, scoring one goal for Viktoria Plzeň that season.

Sylvestre made a total of 25 league appearances as well as eight appearances in the UEFA Cup for Sparta.

=== Mladá Boleslav ===
Later in 2008 Sylvestre joined Mladá Boleslav, signing a four-year contract with the club. He made his debut on 2 August 2008 in a 1–0 defeat away at former club Sparta Prague. His first goal came in the 2–0 home win over 1 FC Brno on 25 August. He made a total of 29 appearances in the 2008–09 season, scoring four goals as Mladá Boleslav finished 6th, just missing out on qualifying for the 2009–10 UEFA Europa League by two points.

The 2009–10 season saw Sylvestre score seven goals in 27 appearances.

=== Blackpool ===
On 8 August 2010, Mladá Boleslav stated on their official website that Sylvestre had travelled to England for a medical the following day with newly promoted Premier League side Blackpool and that he was due to sign a two-year contract with them.

Three days later it was confirmed that Sylvestre had signed a two-year contract with an option of a further year with Blackpool.

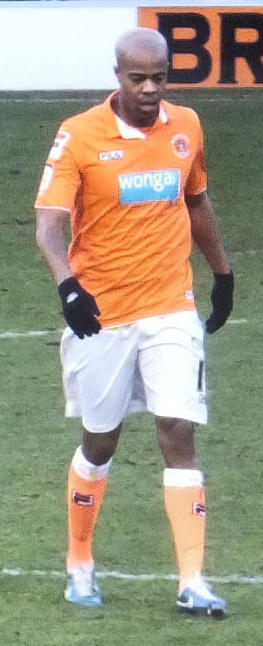
Slyvestre in 2013

On 14 August he made his debut as a 59th-minute substitute as Blackpool marked their Premier League debut with a 4–0 win over Wigan Athletic at the DW Stadium.

His full debut came on 21 August in the 6–0 defeat to Arsenal at the Emirates stadium in the club's second game of their debut season in the Premier League. Three days later he scored his first goal for the Tangerines in the second round of the 2010–11 League Cup, a 4–3 defeat to MK Dons at Stadium MK.

=== Red Star ===
In September 2016, Sylvestre joined Ligue 2 club Red Star, marking his return to his homeland after playing abroad for twelve years.

He retired in summer 2018 having contributed 23 matches and 2 goals during the club's promotion from Championnat National.

== Post-playing career ==
In August 2018, Sylvestre was appointed at Red Star F.C.

== Personal life ==
Sylvestre was born in France and is of Martiniquais descent.

== Career statistics ==
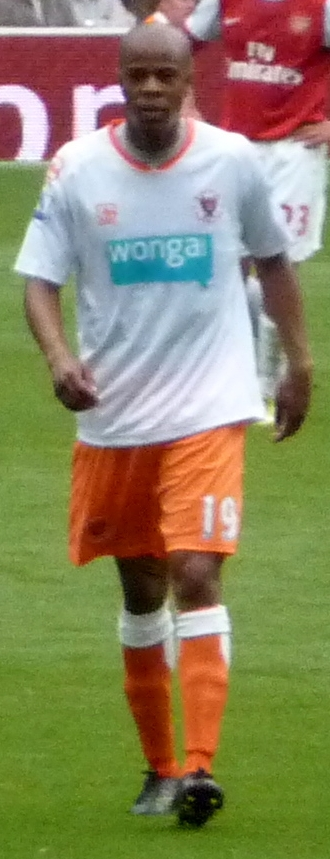
Sylvestre playing for Blackpool in 2010

Appearances and goals by club, season and competition
Club	Season	League			National cup		League cup		Continental		Total	
Club	Season	Division	Apps	Goals	Apps	Goals	Apps	Goals	Apps	Goals	Apps	Goals
Barcelona B	2005–06	Segunda División B	20	0	–		–		–		20	0
Barcelona	2005–06	La Liga	2	0	–		–		–		2	0
Sparta Prague	2006–07	Czech First League	19	0	–		–		2	0	21	0
Sparta Prague	2007–08	Czech First League	6	0	–		–		–		6	0
Sparta Prague	Total		25	0	0	0	0	0	2	0	27	0
Viktoria Plzeň (loan)	2007–08	Czech First League	14	3	–		–		–		14	3
Mladá Boleslav	2008–09	Czech First League	29	4	–		–		–		29	4
Mladá Boleslav	2009–10	Czech First League	27	7	–		–		–		27	7
Mladá Boleslav	2010–11	Czech First League	4	1	–		–		–		4	1
Mladá Boleslav	Total		60	12	0	0	0	0	0	0	60	12
Blackpool	2010–11	Premier League	8	0	1	0	1	1	-		10	1
Blackpool	2011–12	Championship	28	1	3	1	1	0	-		31	2
Blackpool	2012–13	Championship	29	5	2	1	1	0	-		32	6
Blackpool	Total		65	6	6	2	3	1	0	0	74	9
Rizespor	2013–14	Süper Lig	33	0	0	0	–		–		33	0
Rizespor	2014–15	Süper Lig	29	0	6	3	–		–		35	3
Rizespor	2015–16	Süper Lig	25	2	11	1	–		–		36	3
Rizespor	Total		87	2	17	4	0	0	0	0	104	6
Red Star	2016–17	Ligue 2	21	0	1	0	0	0	–		22	0
Red Star	2017–18	Championnat National	23	2	0	0	3	0	–		26	2
Red Star	Total		44	2	1	0	3	1	0	0	48	2
Career total			312	25	23	5	5	2	2	0	343	33

== Honours ==
Sparta Prague

- Czech First League: 2006–07
