= Tom Barkhuizen =

English footballer (born 1993)

Personal information
- Full name: Thomas John Hollywood-Barkhuizen
- Birth name: Thomas John Barkhuizen
- Date of birth: 4 July 1993 (age 33)
- Place of birth: Blackpool, England
- Height: 5 ft 10 in (1.79 m)
- Position: Forward

Team information
- Current team: Bamber Bridge

Youth career
- Blackpool Rangers
- 2009–2010: Blackpool

Senior career*
Years	Team	Apps	(Gls)
2010–2015	Blackpool	21	(2)
2011–2012	→ Hereford United (loan)	38	(11)
2012	→ Fleetwood Town (loan)	13	(1)
2014	→ Morecambe (loan)	5	(0)
2015–2016	Morecambe	54	(15)
2017–2022	Preston North End	199	(33)
2022–2025	Derby County	97	(10)
2025–	Barrow	32	(0)
2026-	→ Bamber Bridge (loan)	0	(0)
- * Club domestic league appearances and goals as of 16:31, 29 August 2026 (UTC)

Thomas John Hollywood-Barkhuizen (born 4 July 1993) is an English professional footballer who plays as a forward for Bamber Bridge, on loan from National League club Barrow.

Barkhuizen started his career at Blackpool, making his senior debut in 2010 he also had loan spells at Hereford United, Fleetwood Town and Morecambe. In 2015, Barkhuizen signed a contract with Morecambe, however this was terminated early in November 2016 due to cashflow issues.

He then signed a pre-contract agreement with Preston North End, which started in January 2017, Barkhuizen made 209 appearances in five and a half years. In July 2022, Barkhuizen signed with Derby County and in his second season in the club helped them gain automatic promotion to the Championship, he would make 113 appearances in three-year spell, scoring 14 times.

== Career ==
=== Blackpool ===
Born in Blackpool, Barkhuizen played junior football on the Fylde coast with Blackpool Rangers.

In May 2009 he signed on as a first-year scholar with Blackpool's youth department. Before that he had been at the Centre of Excellence for four months, and had scored in every game he played at both under-16 and under-17 levels.

On 24 August 2010, whilst still a second-year youth scholar, he made his first team debut in the second round of the 2010–11 League Cup, against Milton Keynes at Stadium MK. Assistant manager Steve Thompson said of Barkhuizen: "Tom has come through the youth set up and I felt he handled himself very well for his debut. He is not the finished article by a long shot but once he gets a little bit of strength I think we've got a decent player there. I thought he did fantastic."

In August 2011, he made a late substitute appearance in the League Cup defeat to Sheffield Wednesday before joining League Two side Hereford United on loan until the end of the year. He scored on his debut in a 4–1 Football League Trophy defeat to Bournemouth on 30 August. His first league goal came on 10 September 2011, in a 3–1 loss against Shrewsbury Town. On 20 December, after scoring seven goals for the Bulls, Barkhuizen stated that he wanted to stay at Edgar Street until the end of the season. His loan deal was extended until the end of the season on 9 January 2012. Then in late February, Barkhuizen would score his first brace despite losing 5–4 to Gillingham and then scored in a 2–1 win over Wimbledon, to end "a run of 10 home games without a win". Following the club's relegated to the Conference from League Two at the end of the 2011–12 season and made thirty eight appearances and scoring eleven times, Barkuizen was praised by Manager Jamie Pitman for his role as a striker and helping the club go into positive forms. Barkhuizen contract with Blackpool was extended for another year.

On 29 August 2012, Barkhuizen joined Blackpool's Fylde coast neighbours Fleetwood Town on loan until January 2013, together with teammate Ashley Eastham who joined on loan for one month. He made his debut three days later in a 4–1 win over Aldershot Town at Highbury Stadium. He scored his first and only goal for Fleetwood in a 2–1 win over Barnet on 29 September 2012. After five months at Fleetwood Town, Barkhuizen returned to his parent club. After this, Barkhuizen signed a one-year contract with the club following the end of the 2012–13 season.

On 24 August 2013, in his second league appearance for the club, Barkhuizen scored his first goal for Blackpool in a 1–0 win over Reading. His second goal for the club came in the FA Cup against Bolton Wanderers on 4 January 2014. However, his season soon was disrupted with fractured and dislocated collarbone injury that kept him out for six weeks and then made his return to action in early March. After the end of 2013–14 season, Barkhuizen making fourteen appearances, his contract with Blackpool after his 12-month contract was activated further.

Shortly after returning to Blackpool, Barkhuizen soon fractured his arm in a practice match that left him out for a month.

=== Morecambe ===
Barkhuizen joined League Two side Morecambe on 17 October 2014 for one month. The next day, on 18 October 2014, Barkhuizen made his debut for Morecambe, where he came on as a substitute for Paul Mullin in the second half, which Morecambe won 2–0 against Burton Albion. After making five appearances for Morecambe, it announced on 17 November that Barkhuizen would return to his parent club in conclusion to his loan spell at Morecambe.

On 9 May 2015, Barkhuizen joined Morecambe permanently on a two-year contract.

After Morecambe were late paying staff wages in November 2016 due to cash-flow problems, the option of selling a player was proposed. Barkhuzien's contract was duly cancelled by mutual consent on 9 November 2016, and Morecambe's wages were paid the same day.

=== Preston North End ===
On 17 November 2016, Barkhuizen agreed a pre-contract agreement with Preston, signing a 2 1/2-year contract and taking the number 29 shirt.

In July 2019 he signed a new three-year contract. He was released at the end of the 2021–22 season.

=== Derby County ===
On 2 July 2022, Barkhuizen joined Derby County on a free transfer, signing a two-year contract. He scored his first goal for Derby in an EFL Cup win over Mansfield Town on 9 August 2022. He scored 6 times in 48 first team appearances during 2022–23 season as Derby finished 7th in the league, missing out on the play-offs by 1 point.

Barkhuizen picked up a calf injury in Derby's first pre-season friendly ahead of the 2023–24 season against Matlock Town on 8 July 2023. He was ruled out of first team action for two months. Barkuzien scored eight goals in 43 appearances for Derby during his second season for the club as they finished runners-up in the division and earn promotion to the Championship automatically.

On 18 May 2024, it was announced that Barkhuizen had trigged a one-year performance-based clause to extend his contract at Derby until June 2025. Barkhuizen had a frustrating start to the 2024–25 season with poor performances and injuries. Barkhuizen would feature 22 times for Derby during the season, but would fail to score; having made only two starts in the league.

On 16 May 2025; it was announced by Derby County the Barkhuizen's contract would not be renewed upon its expiry in June 2025; he played 113 times for Derby, scoring 14 times in his three seasons at the club.

=== Barrow ===
On 29 July 2025, Barkhuizen joined League Two side Barrow on a two-year contract.

=== Bamber Bridge ===
On 28 August 2026, Barkhuizen joined Northern Premier League side Bamber Bridge on a loan from Barrow until January 2027

== Personal life ==
Barkhuizen went to Cardinal Allen Catholic High School in Fleetwood. Barkhuizen is of South African descent through his grandfather, and the South Africa national football team showed an interest in calling him up.

== Career statistics ==
As of match played 26 April 2025

Appearances and goals by club, season and competition
Club	Season	League			FA Cup		League Cup		Other		Total	
Club	Season	Division	Apps	Goals	Apps	Goals	Apps	Goals	Apps	Goals	Apps	Goals
Blackpool	2010–11	Premier League	0	0	1	0	1	0	—		2	0
Blackpool	2011–12	Championship	0	0	0	0	1	0	0	0	1	0
Blackpool	2012–13	Championship	0	0	0	0	1	0	—		1	0
Blackpool	2013–14	Championship	14	1	1	1	0	0	—		15	2
Blackpool	2014–15	Championship	7	0	1	0	0	0	—		8	0
Blackpool	Total		21	1	3	1	3	0	0	0	27	2
Hereford United (loan)	2011–12	League Two	38	11	0	0	—		1 (Note: Appearances in the Football League Trophy)	1	39	12
Fleetwood Town (loan)	2012–13	League Two	13	1	1	0	—		0	0	14	1
Morecambe (loan)	2014–15	League Two	5	0	0	0	0	0	0	0	5	0
Morecambe	2015–16	League Two	40	10	2	1	0	0	3	1	45	12
Morecambe	2016–17	League Two	14	5	1	0	2	0	2 (Note: Appearances in the EFL Trophy)	0	19	5
Morecambe	Total		54	15	3	1	2	0	5	1	64	17
Preston North End	2016–17	Championship	17	6	0	0	0	0	—		17	6
Preston North End	2017–18	Championship	46	8	1	0	0	0	—		47	8
Preston North End	2018–19	Championship	34	6	1	0	2	1	—		37	6
Preston North End	2019–20	Championship	44	9	0	0	3	2	—		47	11
Preston North End	2020–21	Championship	45	4	0	0	2	2	—		47	6
Preston North End	2021–22	Championship	13	0	0	0	1	0	—		14	0
Preston North End	Total		199	33	2	0	8	5	0	0	209	37
Derby County	2022–23	League One	41	4	3	1	2	1	2	0	48	6
Derby County	2023–24	League One	37	6	2	1	0	0	4	1	43	8
Derby County	2024–25	Championship	19	0	1	0	2	0	—		22	0
Derby County	Total		97	10	6	2	4	1	6	1	113	14
Career total			429	71	15	4	17	6	12	3	471	84

== Honours ==
Derby County

- EFL League One second-place promotion: 2023–24
