= Louis Almond =

English footballer (born 1992)

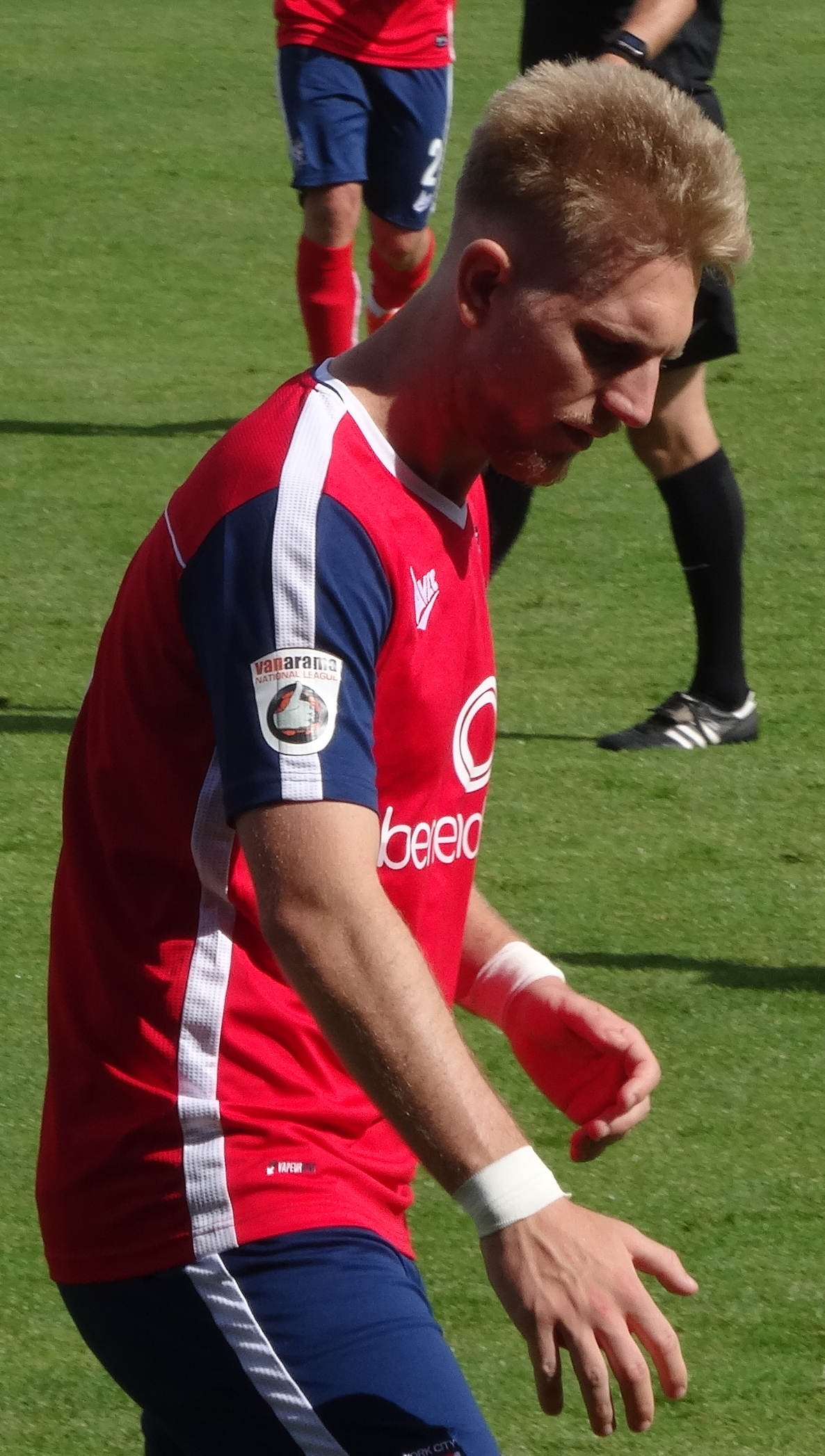
- Almond playing for York City in 2017

Personal information
- Full name: Louis James Almond
- Date of birth: 5 January 1992 (age 34)
- Place of birth: Blackburn, England
- Height: 5 ft 11 in (1.80 m)
- Position: Forward

Team information
- Current team: Ashton United

Youth career
- –2009: Blackpool

Senior career*
Years	Team	Apps	(Gls)
2009–2014	Blackpool	1	(0)
2010	→ Cheltenham Town (loan)	4	(0)
2011	→ Barrow (loan)	20	(6)
2011–2012	→ Barrow (loan)	23	(1)
2012	→ Lincoln City (loan)	5	(1)
2012–2013	→ Barrow (loan)	11	(2)
2013	→ Hyde (loan)	13	(4)
2013–2014	→ Hyde (loan)	28	(4)
2014–2015	Hyde	23	(4)
2015–2016	Southport	59	(16)
2016–2017	Tranmere Rovers	5	(0)
2017	→ Southport (loan)	9	(2)
2017–2018	York City	19	(2)
2018–2020	Chorley	38	(6)
2020–	Ashton United	9	(3)
- * Club domestic league appearances and goals as of 17:42, 21 August 2020 (UTC)

Louis James Almond (born 5 January 1992) is an English semi-professional footballer who plays as a forward for Ashton United. He has played in the Football League for Cheltenham Town and Blackpool.

== Career ==
=== Blackpool and loans ===
Almond was born in Blackburn, Lancashire. He attended Darwen Vale High School and played for the successful team that over the years represented Lancashire in the county cup, and also represented them in Sweden in the year 2000 (aged 8). Almond was at hometown club Blackburn Rovers Academy before joining Blackpool.

Whilst still a member of the Blackpool youth team, Almond became a regular in the club's reserve team in the 2008–09 season. In July 2009, he played for the first team in the pre-season South West Challenge Cup held in North Devon, including playing in the 5–0 win over Barnstaple Town.

Then, still a second-year scholar, Almond made his first-team debut for Blackpool as a 70th-minute substitute in a 2–1 win over Crewe Alexandra at Gresty Road in the first round of the 2009–10 League Cup on 11 August 2009. On 19 March 2010, he joined League Two club Cheltenham Town on loan, making his debut the following day in a 1–1 draw with Port Vale at Whaddon Road.

He went back out on loan on 1 January 2011, to Conference Premier club Barrow, for one month. He scored on his debut, giving him four goals in as many matches. On 31 January 2011, he extended his loan spell at the club until 3 April. Almond returned to Barrow on loan in time for 2011–12, in a deal which allowed him to continue playing in Blackpool reserve matches where possible. The loan deal lasted until January 2012, when he returned to Blackpool, having scored one goal in 26 appearances for Barrow.

On 31 January 2012, Almond joined Conference Premier club Lincoln City on loan until the end of 2011–12. He made five appearances, scoring one goal. On 6 June 2012, he signed a new one-year contract with Blackpool, with an option for a further year.

On 9 August 2013, Almond rejoined Hyde on a season-long loan. The loan lasted until 31 January 2014 when new caretaker manager Barry Ferguson recalled Almond to Bloomfield Road after scoring 4 goals in 29 appearances for bottom placed Hyde. Almond made Blackpool's first-team squad in mid April 2014 and made his Blackpool League debut coming on as substitute for David Goodwillie in a Lancashire derby against Burnley.

=== Hyde ===
After his release from Blackpool, he joined Conference North club Hyde in August 2014.

=== Southport ===
On 2 February 2015, Almond signed for Southport following his release from Hyde. He made his debut in a 5–3 defeat against Forest Green Rovers. He scored his first goal and only goal of 2014–15 Southport five matches after his debut in a 2–2 draw against Grimsby Town. Southport finished 19th that season. In the following season, Almond was a regular for Southport, making 46 appearances scoring 13 goals.

=== Tranmere Rovers ===
On 20 September 2016, Almond signed for Southport's National League rivals Tranmere Rovers for an undisclosed fee. On 23 February 2017, Almond rejoined Southport on loan, with his chances in the Tranmere team limited.

=== York City ===
Almond signed for newly relegated National League North club York City on 30 June 2017 on a one-year contract.

=== Chorley ===
Almond signed for National League North club Chorley on 5 June 2018. He left the club by mutual consent after he was restricted to four appearances in the 2019–20 season through injury.

=== Ashton United ===
On 10 January 2020, Almond moved to Ashton United.

== Career statistics ==
As of 4 January 2020

Appearances and goals by club, season and competition
Club	Season	League			FA Cup		League Cup		Other		Total	
Club	Season	Division	Apps	Goals	Apps	Goals	Apps	Goals	Apps	Goals	Apps	Goals
Blackpool	2009–10	Championship	0	0	0	0	1	0	0	0	1	0
Blackpool	2010–11	Premier League	0	0	—		0	0	—		0	0
Blackpool	2011–12	Championship	0	0	0	0	—		0	0	0	0
Blackpool	2012–13	Championship	0	0	—		0	0	—		0	0
Blackpool	2013–14	Championship	1	0	—		0	0	—		1	0
Blackpool	Total		1	0	0	0	1	0	0	0	2	0
Cheltenham Town (loan)	2009–10	League Two	4	0	—		—		—		4	0
Barrow (loan)	2010–11	Conference Premier	20	6	—		—		—		20	6
Barrow (loan)	2011–12	Conference Premier	23	1	2	0	—		1 (Note: Appearance(s) in FA Trophy)	0	26	1
Barrow (loan)	Total		43	7	2	0	—		1	0	46	7
Lincoln City (loan)	2011–12	Conference Premier	5	1	—		—		—		5	1
Barrow (loan)	2012–13	Conference Premier	11	2	4	1	—		3	0	18	3
Hyde (loan)	2012–13	Conference Premier	13	4	—		—		—		13	4
Hyde (loan)	2013–14	Conference Premier	28	4	1	0	—		—		29	4
Hyde	2014–15	Conference North	23	4	1	0	—		4 (Note: Two appearances in Manchester Premier Cup, two in FA Trophy)	0	28	4
Hyde	Total		64	12	2	0	—		4	0	70	12
Southport	2014–15	Conference Premier	7	1	—		—		—		7	1
Southport	2015–16	National League	42	12	1	0	—		3	1	46	13
Southport	2016–17	National League	10	3	—		—		—		10	3
Southport	Total		59	16	1	0	—		3	1	63	17
Tranmere Rovers	2016–17	National League	5	0	0	0	—		0	0	5	0
Southport (loan)	2016–17	National League	9	2	—		—		—		9	2
York City	2017–18	National League North	19	2	2	0	—		0	0	21	2
Chorley	2018–19	National League North	35	6	3	1	—		3 (Note: One appearance FA Trophy, two in National League North play-offs)	0	41	7
Chorley	2019–20	National League	3	0	1	0	—		0	0	4	0
Chorley	Total		38	6	4	1	—		3	0	45	7
Career total			258	48	15	2	1	0	14	1	288	51

== Honours ==
Chorley

- National League North play-offs: 2019
