= Paul Bignot =

English footballer

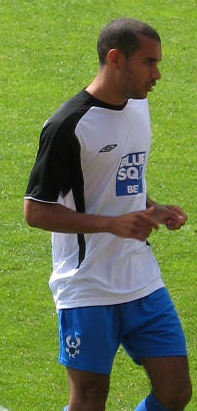
- Bignot as a Kidderminster Harriers player

Personal information
- Full name: Paul Junior Bignot
- Date of birth: 14 February 1986 (age 40)
- Place of birth: Birmingham, England
- Height: 6 ft 1 in (1.85 m)
- Positions: Right back; centre back

Youth career
- –2004: Crewe Alexandra

Senior career*
Years	Team	Apps	(Gls)
2004–2007	Crewe Alexandra	21	(0)
2006	→ Kidderminster Harriers (loan)	3	(0)
2007–2009	Kidderminster Harriers	34	(1)
2009	→ Newport County (loan)	12	(1)
2009–2011	Newport County	101	(1)
2011–2013	Blackpool	0	(0)
2011–2012	→ Plymouth Argyle (loan)	14	(0)
2013–2015	Grimsby Town	36	(1)
2015	Keflavík	9	(0)
2015–2016	Solihull Moors	5	(0)
2016–2017	Newport County	10	(0)
2017–2018	Barrow	12	(0)
2018–2020	AFC Telford United	7	(0)
Total		264	(4)

International career
2011	England C	1	(0)
- * Club domestic league appearances and goals as of 1 May 2018

Paul Junior Bignot (born 14 February 1986) is an English former professional footballer who played as a defender.

He played in the Football League with Crewe Alexandra, Blackpool, Plymouth Argyle and Grimsby Town and Newport County, and in Non-league football with Kidderminster Harriers, Solihull Moors, Barrow and AFC Telford United. He also had a brief stint in Iceland with Keflavík. He was capped once by the England C team in 2011.

== Career ==
=== Crewe Alexandra ===
Birmingham-born Bignot started his career as a trainee at Crewe Alexandra at the age of 13. He progressed through the youth teams, reaching the FA Youth Cup semi final for the first time in the club's history, where they lost to Middlesbrough. Bignot pushed his way through the reserves and into the first team at the age of 18, making his senior debut in a win by a penalty shoot-out over Sunderland in the League Cup. He made his Football League debut the following week in the Championship game away against Rotherham United.

The following season, after Crewe were relegated to League One, he made sixteen league appearances. His last game was against Nottingham Forest at the City Ground. He turned down a contract extension offered by Dario Gradi in search of regular football. He found this at Kidderminster Harriers, where he had previously spent a successful six weeks on loan.

=== Kidderminster Harriers ===
Bignot signed a two-year contract and was a regular in his first season. The following year saw his contract cancelled by mutual consent. After talks with manager Mark Yates, it was decided that it was time for him to move on.

=== Newport County ===
Bignot was signed by Dean Holdsworth at Newport County. In his first full season, Newport won the 2009-10 season Conference South with a record 103 points. He was named in the league's team of year. The 2010-11 season was County's first at that level for over 20 years and Bignot picked up the Newport County Player of the Year, Players' Player, South Wales Argus Player of the Year, and the President's Cup.

He made a total of 113 appearances for County. His form also won him his first England C cap, in a 1–0 win over Belgium U-23 on 9 February 2011 at Kenilworth Road.

=== Blackpool ===
In the summer of 2011, Bignot accepted the offer of a one-week trial at Leicester City. However, Blackpool, recently relegated from the Premier League, made an approach for Bignot and asked him to play for them in a friendly against Scottish Premier League champions Rangers at Bloomfield Road. Following this appearance, he was offered a two-year deal with the option of a third.

On 4 November 2011, he joined League Two side Plymouth Argyle on a three-month loan deal; the first player brought into the club since their exit from administration. He made his debut the following day in a 1–1 draw with Morecambe at Home Park.

On 26 January 2012, after seven league and two cup appearances for the Pilgrims his loan was extended until the end of the season. Bignot played no part in the entire 2012–13 season and was released by Blackpool at the end of the season.

=== Grimsby Town ===
Following a trial, Bignot joined Grimsby Town on 23 July 2013 on a one-year deal. In Bignot's first full season Grimsby reached the semi-final of the FA Trophy losing to eventual winners Cambridge United. Grimsby also reached the conference play-offs to be knocked out by Gateshead. Bignot's first goal came as an equaliser in the 2–2 home League game against Gateshead. Bignot contract got extended for the 14/15 season.

On 19 May 2015, Bignot was released, having spent two years at the club.

=== Keflavík ===
On 27 July Bignot signed for Keflavík on a three-month deal and made his debut against FH

=== Return to Newport County ===
On 30 July 2016 Bignot rejoined Newport County on a one-year contract after a successful trial period. He played his first Football League game for Newport County on 28 August 2016 in the 2–2 draw against Hartlepool United.

On 9 May 2017 Bignot was released by Newport at the end of the 2016–17 season.

=== Non-league ===
In September 2017 he joined Barrow on non-contract terms.

Whilst with AFC Telford United in December 2020, Bignot announced his retirement from competitive football.

== Personal life ==
He is the brother of fellow footballer, turned manager, Marcus Bignot.
