= Elliot Grandin =

French footballer (born 1987)

Personal information
- Full name: Elliot Grandin
- Date of birth: 17 October 1987 (age 39)
- Place of birth: Caen, France
- Height: 1.78 m (5 ft 10 in)
- Position: Winger

Youth career
- Caen

Senior career*
Years	Team	Apps	(Gls)
2004–2008	Caen	55	(6)
2008–2009	Marseille	16	(2)
2009	→ Grenoble (loan)	8	(0)
2010	CSKA Sofia	11	(4)
2010–2013	Blackpool	49	(7)
2012	→ Nice (loan)	12	(0)
2013–2014	Crystal Palace	0	(0)
2014	Blackpool	7	(1)
2014–2015	Astra Giurgiu	2	(1)
2016	Shrewsbury Town	0	(0)
2017	Ermis Aradippou	13	(3)
2018–2019	Fréjus Saint-Raphaël	9	(0)
2019–2020	JS Saint-Pierroise		
2020	Grimsby Town	5	(0)
2021–2022	JS Saint-Pierroise		
2022–2023	AS Cagnes	0	(0)
2023	Cannet Rocheville	0	(0)

International career
2008	France U21	3	(1)
- * Club domestic league appearances and goals as of 13:55, 25 July 2022 (UTC)

Elliot Grandin (born 17 October 1987) is a French former professional footballer who played as a winger

Grandin can also play as a central attacking midfielder. He notably played in the Premier League for Blackpool and previously in France for Caen, Marseille, Nice and Grenoble. He also played for CSKA Sofia, Astra Giurgiu, Ermis Aradippou, Fréjus Saint-Raphaël, JS Saint-Pierroise, as well as stints back in England with Crystal Palace, Shrewsbury Town and Grimsby Town. Grandin has played for France at under-21 level.

== Club career ==
=== Caen ===
Grandin began his career at his hometown club, Caen and signed his professional contract at the club. He made his debut for the first team in the 2004–05 season, making just one substitute appearance, on 28 May 2005 in a 3–2 defeat to Istres as Caen were relegated from Ligue 1 to Ligue 2. This turns out to be his only appearance of the season. In opening game of the 2005–06 season, Grandin started the season well when he scored his first goal for Caen, in a 3–2 loss against Créteil. Grandin scored his second goal of the season, in a 5–0 win against Valenciennes in the first round of the Coupe de la Ligue on 22 September 2005. He once again scored against them for the second time this season, losing 2–1 on 15 September 2006. A month later on 10 February 2006, Grandin scored his third goal of the season, in a 1–0 win against Sète. The club finished fourth in Ligue 2, missing out on promotion to Ligue 1 on goal difference. With his playing time at SM Caen increased, he made a total of nineteen league appearances, scoring three goals (twenty–two appearances and scoring four times in all competitions).

In the 2006–07 season, Grandin scored his first goal of the season, in a 1–0 win against Créteil-Lusitanos on 7 November 2006. He then scored his second goal of the season, in a 3–2 win against Dijon on 22 December 2006. Two weeks later on 7 January 2007, Grandin scored his third goal of the season, in a 2–1 loss against Valenciennes in the first round of the Coupe de France. As he became a first team regular at the club, Grandin was part of the Caen squad that finished as runners-up and won promotion to Ligue 1 after beating Libourne 2–1 in the last game of the season. At the start of the 2007–08 season, Grandin continued to be in the first team for the side despite finding his playing time, coming from the substitute bench. He then scored his first goal of the season, as well as, setting up one of the goals, in a 5–0 win against Bordeaux on 24 November 2007. Grandin also scored two more goals, coming from Coupe de la Ligue matches against Toulouse and Lyon. His performance attracted interest from Marseille. By the time he departed from Caen, Grandin made a total of 55 league appearances for the club and scoring six goals.

=== Marseille ===
On 28 January 2008, midway through the 2007–08 season, Grandin joined Marseille for €400,000. However upon leaving Caen, he was criticised by manager Franck Dumas.

In his first match for the club against Monaco in the last 16 of the Coupe de France, he made an assist for the second goal scored by Mathieu Valbuena, in a 3–1 win. Grandin's debut for Marseille came on 9 February 2008 against Nice and started the match, playing 89 minutes before being substituted, in a 2–0 win. On 17 May 2008, the last day of the season against Strasbourg, he came on as a substitute after an injury to striker Mamadou Niang, and sent his pass set up to Nasri to score as Marseille won 4–3 and so qualified for the preliminary round of the Champions League. At the end of the 2007–08 season, Grandin made eight league appearances, most of them as a substitute.

In the 2008–09 season, Grandin was in the starting line-up in the first game of the season at Rennes, scoring Marseille's fourth goal in stoppage time, in a 4–4 draw. On 13 August 2008, he made his European debut in the third qualifying round of the Champions League, in a single-goal victory at Norwegian side Brann. Four days later on 17 August 2008, Grandin scored his second goal for the club, in a 4–0 win against Auxerre. In the return leg against Brann, he helped Marseille win 2–1 to advance to the next round of the UEFA Cup tournament. However, Grandin then fell out of favour into the plans of Eric Gerets and lack of playing time in Marseille. As a result, he was linked a move away from the club in the January transfer window, with clubs, such as, Grenoble, Le Havre and Strasbourg were interested in signing him. By the time Grandin departed from Marseille, he made a further eight appearances, scoring twice.

Grandin joined fellow Ligue 1 side Grenoble on loan for five months on 30 January 2009. He made his debut on 7 February 2009, starting the whole game, in a goalless home draw with Valenciennes. Grandin became a first team regular for the club, rotating in playing either midfield and striker positions. He made a total of eight appearances before returning to Marseille at the end of the season. Having been told by new manager Didier Deschamps of being in a new plan ahead of the new season, Grandin was linked a move away from Marseille, with Standard Liège, Sheffield Wednesday and Birmingham City interested in signing him in the summer transfer window. On 18 August 2009, it was reported by L'Équipe that he would go on trial in England with Premier League club Stoke City five days later and that Stoke had first option on the player for around €1 million. After returning to France, Marseille released Grandin from his contract on 2 September. The club later called him as one of the worst signings.

=== CSKA Sofia ===
On 5 January 2010, Grandin was reportedly in negotiations with Romanian Liga I club Rapid Bucharest, and was believed to be about to sign for the club; however, on 20 January he signed an 18-month contract with Bulgarian A PFG club CSKA Sofia, after they gave him an improved offer that gave him 30% of any future sale proceeds.

However, Grandin suffered a setback with an injury during the winter break and was sidelined for a month. He made his competitive debut for the club on 13 March 2010 against Sportist Svoge, scoring the opening goal and providing an assist in a 4–1 win. Grandin then scored his second goal for CSKA Sofia, in a 4–2 win against OFC Sliven on 10 April 2010. He scored two goals in two matches between 24 April 2010 and 2 May 2010 against Slavia Sofia and Lokomotiv Sofia. Grandin became a first team regular for the club, and helped CSKA Sofia finish second. Despite missing a total of three matches later in the 2009–10 season, he made a total of ten league appearances and scored four goals.

Ahead of the 2010–11 season, his performances attracted interest from clubs around Europe. But Grandin wanted to stay at CSKA Sofia, only to later to have a change of heart. He played in the opening match of the 2010–11 season, a 1–0 home defeat to local rivals Levski Sofia in the first Eternal derby of the season, on 1 August 2010. Four days later on 5 August 2010, Grandin played in a 2–1 win over Northern Irish IFA Premiership side Cliftonville at Windsor Park, Belfast, in the Third qualifying round of the 2010–11 UEFA Europa League, in what turned out to be his last appearance for the Reds.

=== Blackpool ===
On 11 August 2010, Grandin signed for newly promoted Premier League club Blackpool on a two-year deal, with the option for a third year.

Three days after signing for the club, he made his debut as Blackpool made their bow in the Premier League and set up a goal for Marlon Harewood, who scored twice in a 4–0 win over Wigan Athletic at the DW Stadium. Since joining the club, Grandin was involved in the first team, playing in the midfield position and spoke positively of manager Ian Holloway's personality and tactics. He then played a role in two separate matches against West Bromwich Albion on 1 November 2010 and then against Bolton Wanderers on 27 November 2010 by assisting both matches that saw Blackpool earn a draw and win respectively. However, Grandin suffered a hamstring injury during a match against Sunderland on 28 December 2010 and was substituted in the 19th minute, as the club lost 2–0. But he made his return to the starting line–up against Liverpool on 12 January 2011 and played 64 minutes before being substituted, in a 2–1 win. On 12 February 2011, Grandin scored his first goal for the club in a 1–1 home draw with Aston Villa. Shortly after, Grandin suffered a hamstring injury that saw him miss two matches. He then made his return to the starting line–up against Blackburn Rovers on 19 March 2011 and played 66 minutes before being substituted, in a 2–2 draw. However, Blackpool were relegated to the Championship after losing 4–2 against Manchester United in the last game of the season. At the end of the 2010–11 season, Grandin made twenty–four appearances and scoring once in all competitions.

In the 2011–12 season, Grandin made three starts for Blackpool, as the club earned six points in the first two league matches of the season. However, he suffered an injury on his toe that kept him out for four weeks. After missing 17 games through injury, Grandin made his return to the first team against Barnsley on 26 December 2011, coming on as a 63rd-minute substitute, in a 3–1 win. Two weeks later on 14 January 2012, he scored his first goal of the season and later set up Blackpool's second goal of the game, in a 2–2 draw against Ipswich Town. In a follow–up match against Crystal Palace, Grandin scored his second goal of the season, in a 2–1 win. By the time he was loaned out to OGC Nice, Grandin went on to make seven appearances and scoring two times in all competitions.

In the 2012–13 season, Grandin return to Blackpool after Nice failed to sign him on a permanent basis. Upon returning to the club, he switched number shirt to ten. Grandin made his first appearance of the season against Morecambe in the first round of the League Cup on 12 August 2012, coming on as a second half substitute, in a 2–1 loss. A month later on 18 September 2012, he won a penalty and successfully converted the penalty himself, in a 4–1 win over Middlesbrough. Shortly after, Grandin was not included for the next five matches, after scoring his first goal, and trained with the club's development squad, as manager Holloway explained his reason for leaving out the player as being a bad attitude. In response, he said his intention was wanted to leave Blackpool and expressed his love of the city. Upon his returning to the squad, Grandin scored his first second goal of the season and set up the club's second goal of the game five minutes later, in a 2–2 draw against Nottingham Forest on 22 October 2012. This was followed up by scoring his third goal of the game, in a 1–1 draw against Brighton & Hove Albion. However, the departure of Holloway led to the player's first team opportunities being reduced and appeared an unused substitute for the remainder of the matches played. At the end of the 2012–13 season, he went on to make thirteen appearances and scoring three times in all competitions. Following this, Grandin was released by the club.

==== Loan to Nice ====
Grandin returned to his native country by signing a season-long loan deal with OGC Nice on 28 January 2012. Upon joining the club, he said: "I have had great experiences abroad, in Bulgaria and in England, but I really wanted to come back to France. I felt like I didn't finish the job here. So when the Nice opportunity presented itself, I did everything to make it happen. It is a real challenge for me, I really want to help the club." It was later revealed that a family factor was the reason Grandin returned to his native country to resolve his problem there.

Grandin made his debut for OGC Nice, starting the whole game, in a 2–1 loss against his former club, Marseille on 1 February 2012. Three days later on 4 February 2012, he made his first league appearance in three years, starting a match and playing 63 minutes before being substituted, in a 1–1 draw against Ajaccio. His involvement in the first team for the rest of the 2011–12 season saw him make thirteen appearances in all competitions. Following this, the club did not take up the option to make his move permanent and he returned to Blackpool.

=== Crystal Palace ===
In August 2013, Holloway's new club Crystal Palace signed Grandin from Blackpool on a free transfer. He made his debut on 27 August, in a 2–1 defeat against Bristol City in the second round of the League Cup. In January 2014, Grandin's contract was cancelled by mutual consent, under the management of Tony Pulis, without having made a league appearance.

=== Return to Blackpool ===
On 6 February 2014, Grandin returned to Blackpool on a deal until the end of the 2013–14 season after leaving Crystal Palace at the end of January. Following his return, he said moving back to the club felt like home and revealed that interim manager Barry Ferguson played a role of giving him a chance.

Grandin re-debuted for the club, where he came on for Ángel Martínez, in the 67th minute, as Blackpool and Nottingham Forest drew 1–1 on 8 February 2014. Grandin then scored his first goal for the club, as Blackpool lost 2–1 to Yeovil Town on 5 April 2014. However, he found his first team opportunities limited and found his playing time, coming from the substitute bench. At the end of the 2013–14 season, Grandin went on to make seven appearances and scoring once in all competitions for his second spell at the club. Following this, Blackpool opted not to offer him a new contract. Following his departure from Blackpool, he was linked with a move to Championship clubs, including a return to Blackpool.

=== Later career ===
After leaving Blackpool, Grandin moved to Romania, where he joined Astra Giurgiu on 15 August 2014. Grandin made his debut for the club against Rapid Bucharest on 24 August 2014, coming on as a 74th-minute substitute and scored his first goal for Astra Giurgiu, in a 2–0 win. However, his first team opportunities at the club was limited and found his playing time, coming from the substitute bench. This was due to his struggles in settling in the country. As a result, Grandin found himself in a dispute with Astra Giurgi over an unpaid salary and left the club.

Grandin returned to England, signing for Shrewsbury Town in League One on a short-term deal until the end of the season in February 2016. He was released without making a first team appearance.

After spending six months as a free agent and signing for Cypriots side Ermis Aradippou, Grandin made his debut for the club, coming on as an 85th-minute substitute, in a 2–0 win against Karmiotissa on 15 January 2017. A month later on 18 February 2017, he scored his first goal for Ermis Aradippou, having come on as an 83rd-minute substitute, in a 4–0 win. In a follow–up match against AEK Larnaca, Grandin set up two goals for the club, as they lost 3–2. He later scored two more goals for Ermis Aradippou, coming against Doxa Katokopias and Ethnikos Achna. At the end of the 2016–17 season, Grandin went on to make thirteen appearances and scoring three times in all competitions.

After leaving Cyprus, Grandin returned to France with Fréjus Saint-Raphaël of the Championnat National 2 (fourth tier) on 26 January 2018. He made his debut for the club, starting the whole game, in a 1–0 win against Paulhan-Pézenas on 3 February 2018. At the end of the 2017–18 season, Grandin went on to make nine appearances in all competitions for Étoile Fréjus Saint-Raphaël. The following year, he moved to JS Saint-Pierroise of Réunion, and was part of their team on 4 January 2020 that won 2–1 away to Niort to become the second Outre-Mer club to reach the last 32 of the Coupe de France, and first since French Guianan champions ASC Le Geldar in 1989.

On 31 January 2020, the last day of the 2019–20 winter transfer period, Grandin returned to England joining League Two side Grimsby Town until the end of the season to link up with former manager Ian Holloway. He made his debut for the club, coming on as a 63rd-minute substitute, in a 1–1 draw against Bradford City on 8 February 2020. Grandin made four more starts for Grimsby Town, playing in the centre–midfield position. However, the 2019–20 season came to a premature end, due to the COVID-19 pandemic and the club finished in fifteenth place. Having made five appearances for Grimsby Town, he was released by the club at the conclusion of the 2019–20 season.

== International career ==
Grandin holds both French and Congolese nationalities.

In 2005, he was part of the French youth squad that won the Meridian Cup in Turkey. In May 2008, he was called to the France U21 squad for the first time. Grandin was called up to the France U20 squad for the Toulon Tournament but they were eliminated in the group stage. In August 2008, he was called up to the France U21 squad for the first time. Grandin scored on his U21 debut for the national side, in a 2–2 draw against Slovakia U21 on 19 August 2008. He went on to make three appearances, scoring one goal for France under-21s in 2008. However, Grandin failed to receive a call–up from the U21 national side for the rest of the year.

== Career statistics ==
As of 25 July 2022

Appearances and goals by club, season and competition
Club	Season	League			National cup		League cup		Continental		Total		Ref.
Club	Season	Division	Apps	Goals	Apps	Goals	Apps	Goals	Apps	Goals	Apps	Goals	Ref.
Caen	2004–05	Ligue 1	1	0	0	0	0	0	—		1	0	
Caen	2005–06	Ligue 2	19	3	1	0	2	1	—		22	4	
Caen	2006–07	Ligue 2	23	2	2	1	1	0	—		26	3	
Caen	2007–08	Ligue 1	12	1	1	0	2	2	—		15	3	
Caen	Total		55	6	4	1	5	3	—		64	10	—
Marseille	2007–08	Ligue 1	8	0	0	0	0	0	—		8	0	
Marseille	2008–09	Ligue 1	8	2	0	0	1	0	3	0	12	2	
Marseille	Total		16	2	0	0	1	0	3	0	20	2	—
Grenoble (loan)	2008–09	Ligue 1	8	0	2	0	0	0	—		10	0	
CSKA Sofia	2009–10	A PFG	10	4	1	0	—		—		11	4	
CSKA Sofia	2010–11	A PFG	1	0	0	0	—		1	0	2	0	
CSKA Sofia	Total		11	4	1	0	—		1	0	13	4	—
Blackpool	2010–11	Premier League	23	1	0	0	1	0	—		24	1	
Blackpool	2011–12	Championship	7	2	0	0	0	0	—		7	2	
Blackpool	2012–13	Championship	12	3	0	0	1	0	—		13	3	
Blackpool	Total		42	6	0	0	2	0	—		44	6	—
Nice (loan)	2012–13	Ligue 1	12	0	0	0	1	0	—		13	0	
Crystal Palace	2013–14	Premier League	0	0	0	0	1	0	—		1	0	
Blackpool	2013–14	Championship	7	1	0	0	1	0	—		8	1	
Astra Giurgiu	2014–15	Liga I	2	1	1	0	—		2	0	5	1	
Shrewsbury Town	2015–16	League One	0	0	0	0	0	0	—		0	0	
Ermis Aradippou	2016–17	Cypriot First Division	13	3	0	0	—		—		13	3	
Fréjus Saint-Raphaël	2018–19	National 2	9	0	0	0	0	0	—		9	0	
Grimsby Town	2019–20	League Two	5	0	—		—		0	0	5	0	
Cannet Rocheville	2022–23	National 3	0	0	0	0	—		—		0	0	—
Career total			180	23	8	1	11	3	6	0	205	27	–

== Honours ==
Caen

- Ligue 2 runner-up: 2006–07

France U18

- UEFA–CAF Meridian Cup: 2005
