= Mikel Arteta =

Spanish football manager and former player (born 1982)

- Arteta in 2022

Personal information
- Full name: Mikel Arteta Amatriain
- Date of birth: 26 March 1982 (age 44)
- Place of birth: San Sebastián, Spain
- Height: 1.75 m (5 ft 9 in)
- Position: Midfielder

Team information
- Current team: Arsenal (manager)

Youth career
- 1991–1997: Antiguoko
- 1997–1999: Barcelona

Senior career*
Years	Team	Apps	(Gls)
1999–2002	Barcelona B	42	(3)
2001–2002	→ Paris Saint-Germain (loan)	31	(2)
2002–2004	Rangers	50	(12)
2004–2005	Real Sociedad	15	(1)
2005	→ Everton (loan)	12	(1)
2005–2011	Everton	162	(27)
2011–2016	Arsenal	110	(14)
Total		427	(62)

International career
1998–1999	Spain U16	10	(4)
1999	Spain U17	7	(0)
1999–2001	Spain U18	13	(1)
2002–2003	Spain U21	12	(2)

Managerial career
- 2019–: Arsenal
Medal record
Men's football
Representing Spain
UEFA European Under-16 Championship
Winner	1999 Czech Republic
- * Club domestic league appearances and goals

Mikel Arteta Amatriain (Basque: [mikel arteta amatriãĩn]; born 26 March 1982) is a Spanish professional football manager and former player who is the manager of Premier League club Arsenal.

Arteta played as a midfielder in his playing career. He began his senior club career at Barcelona in 1999, but limited playing time led to a loan move to Paris Saint-Germain in 2001, where he won the UEFA Intertoto Cup in his second season. Arteta joined Rangers in 2002 for £6 million and won the league and league cup in his debut season, scoring a 93rd-minute penalty on the final day. After a brief return to his hometown club Real Sociedad, Arteta signed for Everton in 2005 and was named the club's Player of the Season twice. He joined Arsenal in 2011 for £10 million and won two FA Cups before retiring in 2016. Arteta represented Spain through several youth levels but never played for the senior national team.

Arteta was appointed as an assistant coach to Pep Guardiola at Manchester City in 2016. He returned to Arsenal as manager in 2019 and won the FA Cup in his debut season and their first Premier League title in 22 years in 2026. Arteta has since become Arsenal's seventh-longest serving manager by games managed and the longest-serving current Premier League manager.

== Club career ==
=== Early career ===
Born in San Sebastián, Basque Country, Spain, Arteta began his football career at Antiguoko and befriended fellow midfielder Xabi Alonso as they played together every weekend. The two often played along the beaches and gutters of San Sebastián and dreamed of playing together at Real Sociedad. Arteta left San Sebastián aged 15 in July 1997, with Antiguoko teammates Jon Alvarez and Mikel Yanguas, to trial with Barcelona's youth academy, La Masia. The trio played three trial games and all earned professional contracts with the club. Housed in dormitories, the academy lifestyle was notoriously strict and Arteta's Antiguoko teammates would leave the academy shortly after arrival. It was in these dormitories where Arteta would become room-mates and friends with Víctor Valdés and Andrés Iniesta as teenagers. Arteta also became a friend of Xavi Hernández during his tenure at La Masia. Arteta met then-Barcelona captain and his future coaching mentor Pep Guardiola during this time, while learning the practices of their then-head coach Louis van Gaal.

Arteta trained regularly with Van Gaal's first team but was limited only to appearances in Spain's Segunda División B with Barcelona B. Following Van Gaal's departure from the club on 20 May 2000, incoming coach Lorenzo Serra Ferrer brought Emmanuel Petit and Gerard López into Barcelona's midfield, pushing Arteta further back into a queue which already included Guardiola, Luis Enrique, Phillip Cocu, Iván de la Peña, Xavi and Iniesta. La Masia teammate Jofre Mateu believed that Arteta wouldn't make it at Barcelona purely because of his competition, explaining in 2023, "Everyone knew he had a chance because of his quality but Xavi was extraordinary and Iniesta could play every position. I wasn't expecting him to be a Barcelona star because of the others." With administrative changes in La Masia during the 2000–01 season, Arteta and a number of his club mates quickly learnt that their futures were no longer with Barcelona.

==== Loan to Paris Saint-Germain ====
Midway through the 2000–01 season, Arteta was transferred to French club Paris Saint-Germain on an 18-month loan. He joined a star-studded team managed by Luis Fernandez, a team which included the likes of Mauricio Pochettino, Gabriel Heinze, Jay-Jay Okocha and Nicolas Anelka. Arteta would also later play with Ronaldinho when the Brazilian moved to Paris in the summer of 2001. He made his senior debut on 10 February 2001 against Auxerre in the round of 32 of the 2000–01 Coupe de France. Arteta started the match at the Parc des Princes and played the entire game in which PSG lost 4–0. On 17 February 2001, Arteta made his French Division 1 debut coming off the bench in the 34th minute for Vampeta in a 1–0 defeat against rivals Marseille, away at the Stade Vélodrome. Arteta was used by Fernández primarily as a playmaker during his time in Paris; he played 11 games in his first season and he scored his first senior goal on 12 May 2001 against Lille. During Arteta's second season with PSG, he won the 2001 UEFA Intertoto Cup in the summer, watching both two-legged final games against Brescia from the bench. He played 53 games in total for PSG and scored five goals. PSG wanted to keep Arteta at the end of the loan period, and did have first refusal on the player. Instead, he returned to Barcelona after his loan spell.

=== Rangers ===
Arteta signed for Scottish club Rangers in March 2002 in a £6 million transfer deal. He enjoyed a successful first season in Glasgow and quickly established himself as a first-team regular. Highlights were scoring on his Old Firm debut, and converting a late penalty on the final day of the 2002–03 season, which proved vital for goal difference as Rangers completed the domestic treble of the Scottish Premier League title, Scottish Cup and Scottish League Cup. Arteta was injured shortly before the 2003 Scottish Cup final and missed the match.

Arteta started his second season with Rangers by scoring six goals in the first six games of the season as the club qualified for the Champions League group stages, although they did not qualify from that group and ended the campaign without a trophy. Arteta returned to Spain after two seasons in Glasgow; he later credited his spell at Rangers as helping him develop as a player, stating "Scottish football was tough, really tough. It was really physical, people got at you and I had to improve on that a lot. I think I did that to get to the level that the Premier League required of me."

=== Real Sociedad ===
He joined Real Sociedad for €5.2 million in 2004 with the idea being that Arteta and Xabi Alonso could play together. However, Alonso left for Liverpool and Arteta failed to establish himself in the team, starting only three league matches in the half-season he spent back in San Sebastián.

=== Everton ===
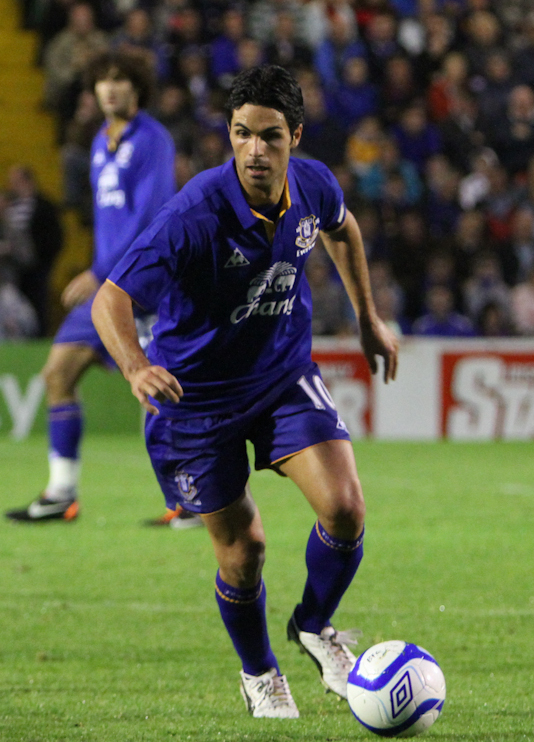
Arteta playing for Everton in 2011

Everton manager David Moyes signed Arteta in the 2005 January transfer window on loan with a view to a permanent transfer. Seen as a replacement for Danish midfielder Thomas Gravesen who had moved to Real Madrid, Arteta played a vital part in helping Everton achieve the possibility of qualifying for the Champions League when they finished fourth in the Premier League; however, they were knocked out controversially by Villarreal in the last qualifying round. He scored his first Everton goal in a 4–0 victory over Crystal Palace, and signed a permanent five-year deal in July 2005 for a fee of £2 million.

The 2005–06 season saw Arteta pick up both the Everton Player of the Season and the Players' Player of the Season awards. Arteta's good form extended into 2006–07. As well as retaining his starting place, he frequently turned in man-of-the-match displays, and finished the season with nine goals from the 35 league games he played. Arteta was awarded the Player of the Season Award for the second consecutive year. He was also voted the Premier League's 'Midfielder of the Year' by the viewers of Sky Sports, beating PFA Players' Player of the Year Cristiano Ronaldo to the award.

Arteta's creativity was an essential part of Everton's attacking play the following season, and he had scored six goals by the end of January. That improved further a season later, with Arteta scoring nine times in the 2006–07 season and once again ending the season as the Player of the Year. He helped Everton secure a place in the UEFA Cup and was ranked by the ACTIM Index as the sixth best player in the Premier League, but it did not earn him a call-up into the full Spain squad. During the summer of 2007, he signed a new five-year contract.

Arteta added another accolade to his growing collection during the 2007–08 season, when he picked up the North West Footballer of the Year award. He then became the first Everton player in five years to receive the Liverpool Echo's Sports Personality of the Year award in January 2008. Arteta suffered a stomach injury in the second half of the season, and shortly before the final game of the campaign, he underwent surgery to rectify the problem. He scored his first goal of the 2008–09 season in the Premier League opener versus Blackburn Rovers with a free kick. He was named captain for a 2–2 draw with Newcastle United, scoring a penalty in the game. In February, Arteta was carried off on a stretcher in a 0–0 draw with Newcastle having injured a ligament in his knee, days after his first inclusion in the Spain national team squad. The injury kept him out for the rest of the 2008–09 season and the first five months of 2009–10. Over the course of the season, Arteta began to play in the centre of the field again, usually being partnered with a defensive midfielder. This gave him the freedom to dictate the tempo of the game and connect with Pienaar and Osman on the wing.

Arteta made his return from injury in January 2010 as a substitute in an FA Cup tie against Birmingham City, before starting in a 2–1 home Premier League win against Chelsea. His first two goals of the season were scored in a 5–1 win over Hull City in March 2010. In August that year, he signed a five-year contract extension with Everton. The 2010–11 season proved to be not as successful as expected for both the team and the player. After early goals in the season, against Manchester United in a thriller 3–3 comeback at Goodison Park, and in a 2–0 win in the Merseyside derby, Arteta suffered a loss of form that would be crucial in Everton's push for a European spot. He began to show again glimpses of creative power in the final part of the season, when he was played again on the wing, enjoying more freedom and space.

Upon departing Everton, Arteta said "I am 29 years old so I haven't got much time left to take a chance like this one. I have done my best for Everton." A few weeks later, he stated that the spirit in Everton's dressing room is the 'best in football'.

=== Arsenal ===
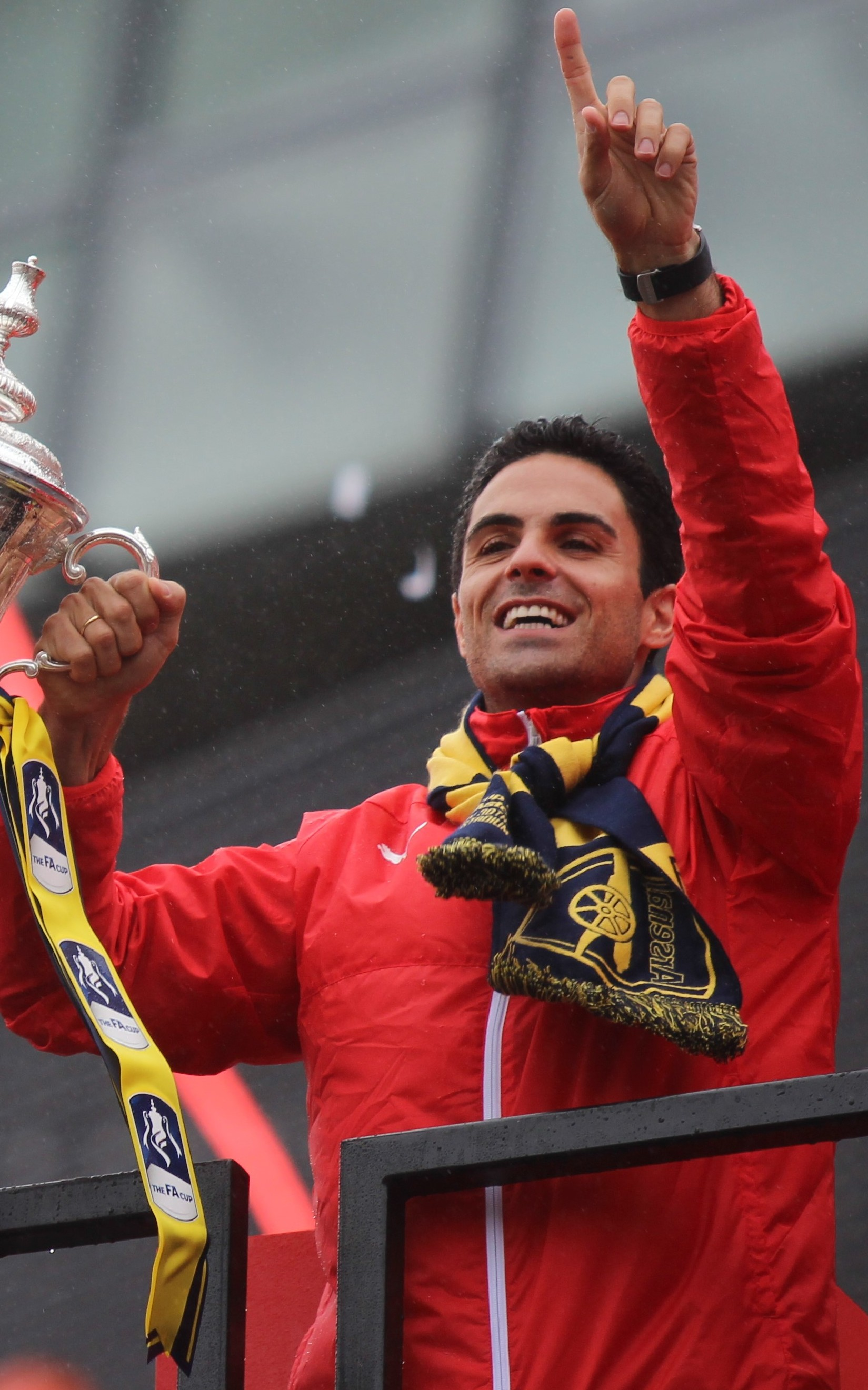
Arteta celebrates winning the FA Cup with Arsenal in 2015

Arteta signed for Arsenal on 31 August 2011 on a four-year deal for a reported fee of £10 million. He made his debut on 10 September in a 1–0 home win against Swansea City, and scored his first Premier League goal for Arsenal in a 4–3 loss against Blackburn Rovers at Ewood Park. Arteta got his first chance to captain the Gunners in the third-round FA Cup victory over Leeds United, a game in that marked the second Arsenal debut of Thierry Henry. Arteta suffered an ankle sprain in his side's 2–1 loss to Wigan Athletic on 16 April, which sidelined him for the remainder of the season. Despite this he made 29 appearances all season, scoring 6 times, and was voted by the fans as the fifth most important player of the 2011–12 campaign in Arsenal's Player of the Season poll.

Following the departure of captain Robin van Persie, Arteta was made Arsenal's vice-captain for the 2012–13 season. He was voted by the fans as the fourth best player of the 2012–13 campaign in Arsenal's Player of the Season poll, after leading the team to their 17th consecutive top four finish. He missed the beginning of 2013–14 due to injury, but returned to the squad by the end of September, going on to score and be sent off in the same match, a 2–0 win away to Crystal Palace in October. Arsenal reached the 2014 FA Cup final, with Arteta scoring against former club Everton in the quarter-final, as well as in the semi-final shootout against Wigan Athletic. Arteta captained the side for the final at Wembley, leading them to a 3–2 win against Hull City and receiving his first major honour in English football.

Arteta became Arsenal's new club captain ahead of the 2014–15 season. He won his first trophy as full-time captain, playing the full 90 minutes as Arsenal beat Manchester City 3–0 in the 2014 FA Community Shield. Despite his new appointment, he would only make 11 appearances for the whole season, scoring once. Arteta signed a one-year extension with Arsenal for the 2015–16 season and came on as a substitute as Arsenal beat Chelsea 1–0 to win the 2015 FA Community Shield, his first competitive appearance for the club since November 2014. His final game for Arsenal came on the last day of the season. Arteta came on as a substitute and forced Aston Villa goalkeeper Mark Bunn into scoring an own goal after his shot went off the crossbar. He received a standing ovation from the crowd at full time.

== International career ==
Arteta played for Spain at youth level. He played in the victorious 1999 UEFA European Under-16 Championship campaign, at the 1999 UEFA–CAF Meridian Cup, 1999 FIFA U-17 World Championship, and captained the side in the 2004 U21 European Championships qualifying campaign. In 2010, there were moves by the English FA and Fabio Capello to see if Arteta could represent England, believing he qualified under FIFA's five-year residency rule. FIFA ruled this out, however, with Arteta claiming in an interview in 2016 that he "almost went to war with FIFA" over the ruling.

Arteta was believed to be in Spain's squad in February 2009 but a cruciate knee ligament injury meant his name was removed from the list before the squad was announced. Often noted to be one of the best players in modern times to be omitted a senior international cap, Arteta played at a time when Spain had several enormously high quality players available in his position, such as Xavi, Andrés Iniesta, Xabi Alonso, Cesc Fàbregas, Marcos Senna, Sergio Busquets, Santi Cazorla and David Silva.

== Style of play ==
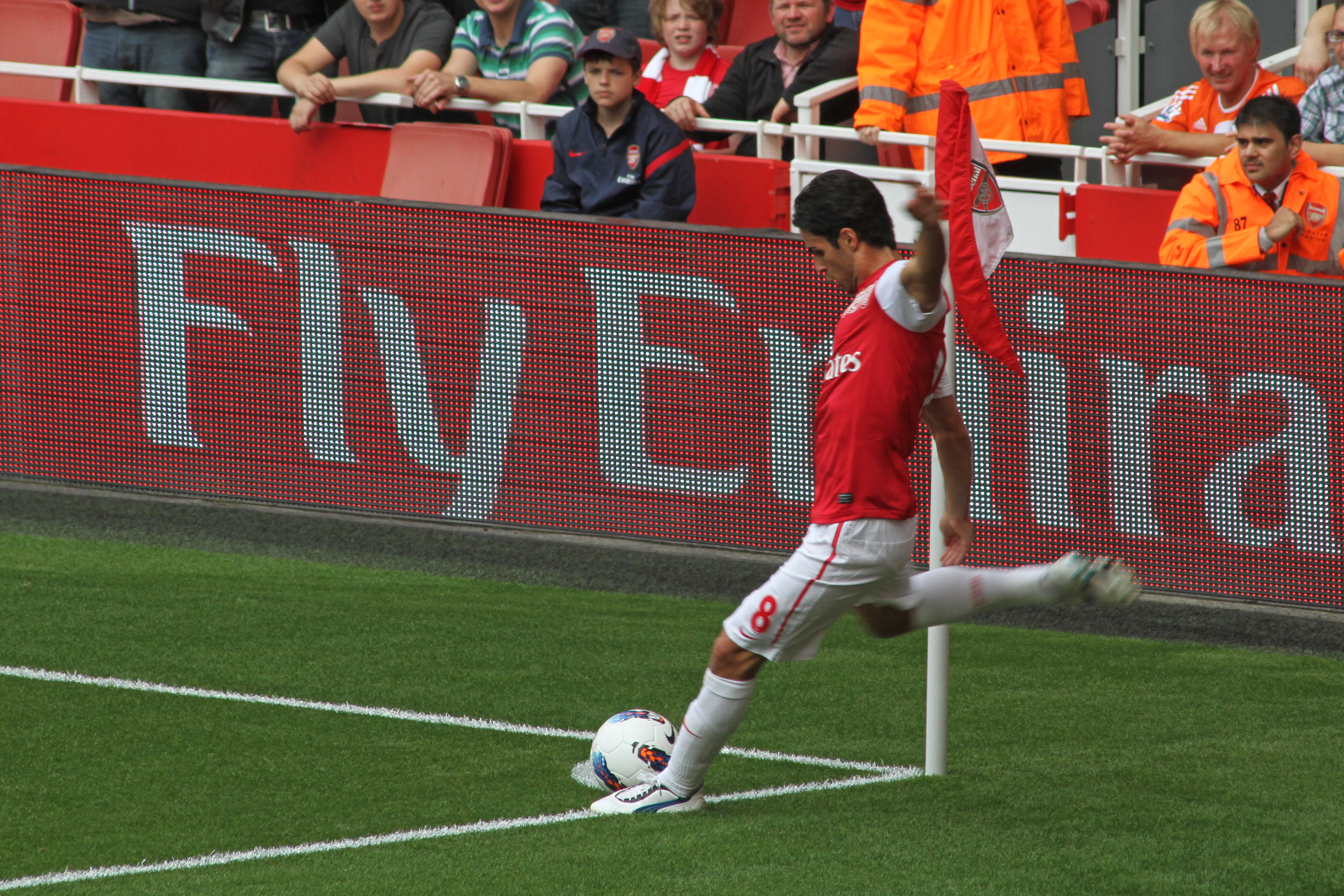
Arteta taking a corner kick for Arsenal in 2011

Arteta initially started out playing as a number 10 in the Barcelona youth system, and was later shifted to the position of a "pivot" or defensive midfielder, as he was thought to be a player in the mould of Pep Guardiola. He was rated as the sixth most effective player in the Premier League in 2006–07 by the official player ratings system the Actim Index. Arteta returned to his original deeper midfield role at Arsenal. in which he excelled as his team's playmaker, due to his technique, skill, vision, passing, awareness, and tactical intelligence. His total of 12 league assists in the 2006–07 season was third to Cesc Fàbregas and Cristiano Ronaldo. With 100 fouls committed against him in the same season, he was the most fouled player in the Premier League.

== Coaching and managerial career ==
=== Manchester City ===
Arteta had three options upon retirement. He was offered to lead the Arsenal Academy, by Arsène Wenger, join Mauricio Pochettino's (his teammate from PSG) backroom staff at Tottenham Hotspur or join Pep Guardiola's coaching team at Manchester City. On 3 July 2016, Arteta was appointed an assistant coach at Manchester City, alongside Brian Kidd and Domènec Torrent, who operated as deputies to Pep Guardiola.

Guardiola and Arteta first met at the Barcelona academy, although Guardiola was already established in the first team, being 11 years older than Arteta. Since then, the two kept in touch. Guardiola was convinced Arteta – who was an Arsenal player at the time – would make a good coach when he called him to get information on Chelsea, prior to their 2012 Champions League semi-finals against Barcelona. Arteta earned his UEFA Pro Licence after completing the course run by the Football Association of Wales.

In 2015, when Guardiola was exiting Bayern Munich, Arteta, in his final year as a player, re-connected and the two men decided to work together. Arteta stood in as Man City manager in a 2–1 Champions League loss against Lyon on 19 September 2018, because of Guardiola's touchline ban. At Man City, Arteta won two Premier League titles, an FA Cup, and two EFL Cups. In 2018, Arteta became strongly linked with the Arsenal manager's vacancy, following the departure of his former manager Arsène Wenger, but Unai Emery was eventually hired.

=== Arsenal ===
==== 2019–22: Early years and FA Cup win ====
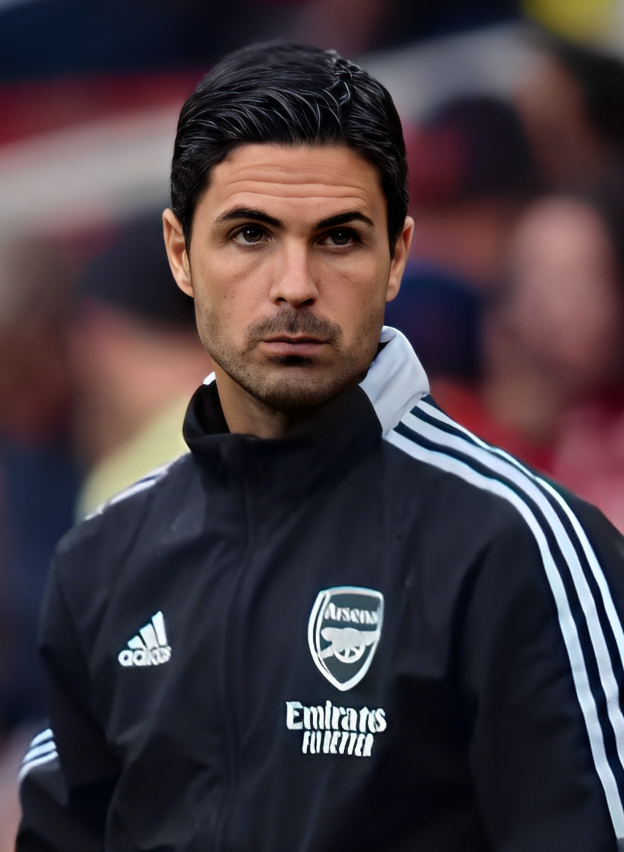
Arteta in 2021

On 20 December 2019, Arteta was appointed head coach at his former club Arsenal, signing a deal until 2023. Upon his appointment, he stated that he believed the club had lost direction and that he didn't want players to shirk responsibility: "I want people to take responsibility for their jobs and I want people who deliver passion and energy in the football club. Anyone who doesn't buy into this, or that has a negative effect or whatever, is not good enough for this environment or this culture." Arteta named his coaching staff on 24 December, with assistants Albert Stuivenberg and Steve Round, and goalkeeping coach Iñaki Caña joining the club. Interim head coach Freddie Ljungberg remained as assistant coach, and goalkeeping coach Sal Bibbo stayed to work with Caña.

On 26 December 2019, Arteta took charge for the first time as an Arsenal manager for their Premier League match against Bournemouth which ended in a 1–1 draw, thanks to a second half equaliser from Pierre-Emerick Aubameyang. Despite the draw, he stated he was pleased with the "attitude, passion and the fighting spirit" of his players. On 1 January 2020, Arteta got his first win as Arsenal coach: a 2–0 win over Manchester United at the Emirates. On 18 July 2020, Arsenal beat Arteta's former employer Manchester City 2–0 in the FA Cup semi-final, leading Arsenal to their fourth FA Cup final in seven years, and Arteta's first in charge. Arsenal went on to win the final 2–1 over Chelsea for a record 14th victory, making Arteta the first person to win the FA Cup as both captain and coach of Arsenal. Moreover, he became the first head coach or manager to win a major trophy in his first season in charge of the club since George Graham in 1986–87.

Prior to the start of the 2020–21 season, Arsenal announced that assistant coach Freddie Ljungberg and goalkeeping coach Sal Bibbo had departed the club; while assistant coaches Carlos Cuesta and Miguel Molina, and set-piece coach Andreas Georgson joined Arteta's backroom staff. On 29 August, Arteta won his second trophy as manager after Arsenal beat Liverpool 5–4 on penalties in the FA Community Shield. On 10 September, Arteta's role was formally changed from first team head coach to manager, reflecting a wider remit at the club. On 23 January 2021, Arteta had his first defeat in the FA Cup in his managerial career as Arsenal was knocked out by Southampton in the fourth round, unable to defend the title. On 14 March 2021, Arteta claimed his first victory in the North London derby as a manager thanks to goals from Martin Ødegaard and Alexandre Lacazette in a 2–1 win. That was also Arsenal's first victory over Tottenham since December 2018. In the Europa League, he led Arsenal to the semi-finals, in which they lost 2–1 on aggregate to Unai Emery's Villarreal. Later on, Arsenal finished 8th in the Premier League, and the 25-year run of participating in European competitions came to an end.

In July 2021, set-piece coach Nicolas Jover joined Arteta's coaching team, replacing Andreas Georgson who had departed the club. On 13 August, Arsenal started their season with a 2–0 loss to newly promoted Brentford, followed by losses to Chelsea and Manchester City which left the club bottom of the league without a point or a goal, and left Arteta in a precarious position going into the international break. Arsenal resisted calls from supporters for Arteta to be sacked, and the club duly went on to win all their league games in September, leading to Arteta receiving his first manager of the month award. On 1 April 2022, Arteta received his second Manager of the Month award and on 6 May extended his contract to the end of the 2024–25 season. Having sat in fourth place throughout much of the second half of the campaign, successive defeats away at both Tottenham Hotspur and Newcastle United in the closing weeks of the season saw Arsenal slip to 5th in the final table, and having to settle for a campaign in the UEFA Europa League for the following season.

==== 2022–present: Premier League win and European campaigns ====
Arsenal began their 2022–23 campaign with a 2–0 win away to Crystal Palace on 5 August 2022. The victory was Arteta's 50th league win as Arsenal boss, making him the second-quickest manager to reach 50 top-flight wins for the Arsenal after Arsène Wenger. On 20 August, the Gunners beat Bournemouth 3–0 in matchweek 3. The win vaulted them to the top of the Premier League for the first time since 2016, and ensured it was the first time Arsenal had won their opening three fixtures since the 2004–05 season. On 27 August, Arsenal beat Fulham 2–1 at Emirates Stadium, marking Arteta's 100th Premier League game in charge. The Gunners finished the month with a 2–1 win at home over Aston Villa on 31 August. It was the fourth time Arsenal had started a top-flight season with a run of five wins, after 1930–31, 1947–48 and 2004–05. Mikel Arteta became the 11th manager to have won the first five games of a Premier League season, after Kevin Keegan, Carlo Ancelotti, Alex Ferguson, Arsène Wenger, Alan Curbishley, José Mourinho, Manuel Pellegrini, Pep Guardiola, Maurizio Sarri, and Jürgen Klopp. After leading the Gunners to wins in all five of their Premier League matches of August, Mikel Arteta was named Premier League Manager of the Month, winning the award for the third time following his previous successes in September 2021 and March 2022.

On 16 October 2022, Arteta's side beat Leeds United 1–0 at Elland Road. This was the club's best start to a top-flight campaign as the Gunners had won nine of their first ten league games for the first time ever. The result also moved Arsenal four points clear at the top of the Premier League. On 6 November, the Gunners beat Chelsea 1–0 at Stamford Bridge. This was Arteta's 87th victory in 150 games in charge of Arsenal – more than any of his predecessors, including George Graham and Arsène Wenger, over the equivalent period. After guiding Arsenal to four wins from four Premier League games in November and December, Mikel Arteta picked up his second Premier League Manager of the Month award of the campaign, winning the award for the fourth time since December 2019.

On 22 January 2023, Arteta's side beat Manchester United 3–2 at home. The victory put them a five-point advantage at the top of the Premier League with a game in hand, and meant that Arsenal had 50 points from 19 games at the halfway stage of the league season – their best start to a top-flight campaign – 15 more than they had at the same stage last season. After leading the Gunners to two wins and a draw in January from their Premier League games against three teams vying for a place in the top four, Mikel Arteta was named Premier League Manager of the Month for the third time this season – the fifth time since December 2019. He was the first manager to win the award in successive months since Manchester City's Pep Guardiola did so in November and December 2021. Arteta also became the first Arsenal manager to win the award three times in a single campaign, which was the first time that had happened in the league since Liverpool's Jürgen Klopp won five in the 2019–20 season.

On 12 March, Arsenal beat Fulham 3–0 at Craven Cottage. This was Arteta's 100th win in his 168th game in charge of Arsenal, meaning he has the best win percentage of any Arsenal manager. Arteta said afterwards "there is still a lot to improve." The following day, he was awarded Manager of the Year at the 2023 London Football Awards. He won his fourth Manager of the Month award of the season in March. Following a loss on penalties to Sporting CP after a 2–2 aggregate draw in the UEFA Europa League round of 16, injuries to key players William Saliba and Takehiro Tomiyasu would prove detrimental, as Arsenal's seven-game winning streak spanning from mid-February to early April would derail with three consecutive draws to Liverpool, West Ham United, and bottom-of-the-table Southampton, before a 4–1 loss at the Etihad Stadium to allow second-place Manchester City to capitalise on Arsenal's drop in form. By 20 May, Arsenal could no longer mathematically win the title after consecutive losses to Brighton and Nottingham Forest, finishing in second-place and handing the title to Manchester City, being crowned Premier League champions for the third consecutive season before completing the continental treble. The team's second-place finish meant Arteta was the first manager since Arsène Wenger six years earlier to guide Arsenal to a Champions League qualification spot, and was the highest position Arsenal had finished in since being league runners-up in 2015–16.

It was reported in July 2023 that assistant coach Steve Round had departed the club. Arsenal opened their 2023–24 campaign with a 4–1 victory via penalty shoot-out following a 1–1 draw against reigning champions Manchester City, winning the 2023 FA Community Shield accounting for Arteta's third trophy as Arsenal manager. On 8 October, Arteta's Arsenal defeated Manchester City at the Emirates Stadium 1–0 to end Arsenal's 12-game straight losing run against City in the Premier League. Arteta's 200th game as Arsenal manager came on 25 November, which saw Arsenal win 1–0 away at Brentford to take top spot of the Premier League for the first time in the season. On 29 November, Arteta led Arsenal to the Champions League knockout stages for the first time since 2016–17, following a 6–0 win over Lens to win Group B. Arteta was named Premier League Manager of the Month for February due to Arsenal's 100% win record throughout the month as well as scoring 18 goals in the process. In the Champions League round of 16, Arsenal defeated Porto on penalties to reach the quarter-finals of the tournament for the first time since 2009–10. On 12 May 2024, Arsenal defeated Manchester United in a 1–0 away win at Old Trafford to secure 27 wins in the 2023–24 campaign at that point, the most for a 38-game season in the club's history; surpassing the record set by the Invincibles in the 2003–04 season. However despite beating Everton 2–1 on the final day of the season, Arsenal finished runner up to Manchester City for the second season in a row missing out on the title by two points.

On 12 September 2024, Arteta extended his contract to remain Arsenal manager for three years. In the 2024–25 season, Arsenal finished second in the league for the third consecutive year, behind Liverpool. In the Champions League, the club defeated reigning European champions Real Madrid in the quarter-finals to reach the semi-finals for the third time and the first time since 2008–09, before being eliminated by eventual winners Paris Saint-Germain. During the 2025–26 season, Arteta secured his 200th win as a club manager in a 3–2 Champions League victory over Kairat on 28 January 2026. On 22 March, Arsenal lost the EFL Cup final 2–0 to Manchester City. In their following match, they were knocked out by Southampton in the FA Cup quarter-final, where they lost 2–1. In their subsequent Premier League matches, Arsenal lost 2–1 to Bournemouth and Manchester City, narrowing their lead over the latter. However, he led the club to their second consecutive semi-final in the Champions League after 1–0 victory on aggregate against Sporting CP. On 5 May, Arsenal defeated Atlético Madrid 2–1 on aggregate to reach the final in Budapest. This was the first time the club had reached a UEFA Champions League final in twenty years, the last time being against Barcelona in 2006. Later that month, on 19 May, following a 1–1 draw between Manchester City and Bournemouth, Arsenal were crowned champions of the Premier League. Hence, he became the first manager to win the Premier League title with a club he had previously represented as a player. In the Champions League final against Paris Saint-Germain, his side took an early lead before adopting a more defensive approach as the match progressed, eventually drawing 1–1 after extra time and losing 4–3 on penalties.

== Style of management ==
As a manager, Arteta was influenced by his time playing under Arsène Wenger and serving as an assistant to Pep Guardiola, as well as by the philosophy instilled in him during his spell with the Barcelona youth academy; he had also drawn from tactical elements used by José Mourinho. As head coach of Arsenal, Arteta mainly uses a 4–3–3 or 4–3–2–1 formation, although he has also been known to use a 3–4–3 formation on occasion. Tactically, his teams look to control games and create chances by dominating possession through fluid, creative passing, often building plays from deep. His team often create wide overloads to allow players to cut back, while the use of 3–2 defensive shell when in possession helps to prevent counter-attacks. His team are also effective at creating chances from attacking set-pieces.

Defensively, his teams are solid and versatile; they are capable of pressing high up the pitch, but also of making an effective use of an aggressive low block, which becomes a 5–4–1, 5–3–2 or 5–2–3 depending on the opponent, and are even capable of posing a threat from counter-attacks. However, although Arteta has been praised in the media for his ability as a manager, at times his style as Arsenal's manager has also been criticised in the press for being too rigid and formulaic; he has also drawn criticism from pundits at times for his perceived inability to manage the pressure placed on his players, and for not bringing more success to the club.

== Personal life ==
Arteta was born on 26 March 1982 in San Sebastián, in the Basque Country of Spain. He is fluent in Spanish, Basque, Catalan and English, and also speaks French, Italian and Portuguese. He is married to Argentine-Spanish actress, television host, and model Lorena Bernal. The couple have three children: Gabriel (born 2009), Daniel (born 2012) and Oliver (born 2015).

Arteta is a dual citizen of Spain and the United Kingdom. He acquired British citizenship in 2010, with the hopes of representing the England national football team, although he was later ruled to be ineligible by FIFA.

On 15 May 2024, Arteta was awarded The Royal Order of Isabella the Catholic at the Spanish Embassy in London. Commenting on granting the award to Arteta, the Spanish ambassador to the UK, José Pascual Marco Martínez, said: “Mikel is a respected and loved figure in the Spanish and British football community. Through the universal language of football, he has succeeded in making the friendship between the two countries stronger.”

In August 2025, Arteta was appointed a global ambassador and director of performance for sportswear company Under Armour.

== Career statistics ==
Appearances and goals by club, season and competition
Club	Season	League			National cup (Note: Includes Coupe de France, Scottish Cup, Copa del Rey, FA Cup)		League cup (Note: Includes Coupe de la Ligue, Scottish League Cup, Football League Cup)		Europe		Other		Total	
Club	Season	Division	Apps	Goals	Apps	Goals	Apps	Goals	Apps	Goals	Apps	Goals	Apps	Goals
Barcelona B	1999–2000	Segunda División B	26	1	—		—		—		—		26	1
Barcelona B	2000–01	Segunda División B	16	2	—		—		—		—		16	2
Barcelona B	Total		42	3	—		—		—		—		42	3
Paris Saint-Germain	2000–01	French Division 1	6	1	1	0	0	0	4 (Note: Appearances in UEFA Champions League)	0	—		11	1
Paris Saint-Germain	2001–02	French Division 1	25	1	3	1	4	1	10 (Note: Six appearances in the UEFA Cup, four appearances and one goal in UEFA Intertoto Cup)	1	—		42	4
Paris Saint-Germain	Total		31	2	5	1	4	1	14	1	—		53	5
Rangers	2002–03	Scottish Premier League	27	4	3	1	4	0	1 (Note: Appearances in UEFA Cup/UEFA Europa League)	0	—		35	5
Rangers	2003–04	Scottish Premier League	23	8	3	0	1	0	6	1	—		33	9
Rangers	Total		50	12	6	1	5	0	7	1	—		68	14
Real Sociedad	2004–05	La Liga	15	1	2	0	—		—		—		17	1
Everton	2004–05	Premier League	12	1	1	0	0	0	—		—		13	1
Everton	2005–06	Premier League	29	1	4	1	1	0	3 (Note: Two appearances in UEFA Champions League qualification, one appearance and one goal in UEFA Cup qualification)	1	—		37	3
Everton	2006–07	Premier League	35	9	1	0	3	0	—		—		39	9
Everton	2007–08	Premier League	28	1	0	0	2	0	7	3	—		37	4
Everton	2008–09	Premier League	26	6	3	1	0	0	2	0	—		31	7
Everton	2009–10	Premier League	13	6	1	0	0	0	2	0	—		16	6
Everton	2010–11	Premier League	29	3	3	0	1	0	—		—		33	3
Everton	2011–12	Premier League	2	1	0	0	1	1	—		—		3	2
Everton	Total		174	28	13	2	8	1	14	4	—		209	35
Arsenal	2011–12	Premier League	29	6	3	0	0	0	6	0	—		38	6
Arsenal	2012–13	Premier League	34	6	2	0	0	0	7	0	—		43	6
Arsenal	2013–14	Premier League	31	2	5	1	1	0	6	0	—		43	3
Arsenal	2014–15	Premier League	7	0	0	0	0	0	4	1	1 (Note: Appearance in FA Community Shield)	0	12	1
Arsenal	2015–16	Premier League	9	0	2	0	1	0	1	0	1	0	14	0
Arsenal	Total		110	14	12	1	2	0	24	1	2	0	150	16
Career total			422	60	38	5	19	2	59	7	2	0	539	74

== Managerial statistics ==
As of match played 21 November 2026

Managerial record by team and tenure
Team	From	To	Record				
Team	From	To	P	W	D	L	Win %
Arsenal	22 December 2019 (Note: Arteta's appointment was announced on 20 December 2019 but did not take effect until 22 December. The intervening match against Everton was taken by interim head coach Freddie Ljungberg.)	Present	371	227	70	74	61.2
Total			371	227	70	74	61.2

== Honours ==
=== Player ===
Paris Saint-Germain

- UEFA Intertoto Cup: 2001

Rangers

- Scottish Premier League: 2002–03
- Scottish League Cup: 2002–03

Arsenal

- FA Cup: 2013–14, 2014–15
- FA Community Shield: 2014, 2015

Spain U16

- UEFA European Under-16 Championship: 1999

Spain U18

- UEFA–CAF Meridian Cup: 1999

Individual

- Scottish Premier League Young Player of the Month: September 2002, August 2003
- Everton Player of the Season: 2005–06, 2006–07
- Everton Players' Player of the Season: 2005–06

=== Manager ===
Arsenal

- Premier League: 2025–26
- FA Cup: 2019–20
- FA Community Shield: 2020, 2023, 2026
- EFL Cup runner-up: 2025–26
- UEFA Champions League runner-up: 2025–26

Individual

- Globe Soccer Awards Best Premier League Coach: 2023–24
- Premier League Manager of the Season: 2025–26
- Premier League Manager of the Month: September 2021, March 2022, August 2022, November/December 2022, January 2023, March 2023, February 2024, March 2026
- London Football Awards Manager of the Year: 2023

=== Orders ===
- Officer's Cross of the Royal Order of Isabella the Catholic: 2024

== See also ==
- List of English football championship–winning managers
- List of FA Cup winning managers
- List of Arsenal F.C. managers
