= Miguel Molina =

Miguel Molina may refer to:

- Miguel Molina (footballer) (born 1993), Spanish football coach
- Miguel Molina (racing driver) (born 1989), professional racing driver from Spain
- Miguel Molina (swimmer) (born 1984), swimmer from the Philippines
- Miguel Molina (amateur wrestler), Cuban wrestler; see Wrestling at the 1995 Pan American Games
- Miguel Molina (professional wrestler) (born 1991), American professional wrestler, better known as Angel Ortiz or Ortiz

== See also ==
- Miguel de Molinos (1628–1696), Spanish mystic
