= Serge Gumienny =

Belgian football referee

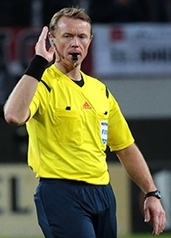
Gumienny in October 2015

Serge Gumienny (born 14 April 1972 in Sint-Truiden) is a former Belgian football referee. He frequently operates in the Belgian First Division, Belgian Second Division and Belgian Cup. Occasionally he referees a matches in the Dutch Eredivisie, the UEFA Intertoto Cup, the UEFA Europa League and the UEFA Champions League. He also has whistled matches overseas and frequently operates as fourth official in the games refereed by Frank De Bleeckere. On 25 December 2008, he was promoted to the European A-category (Elite development). He has whistled 250 games in the Belgian first division.

== Belgian Supercup ==
- 2003 Club Brugge – La Louvière
- 2006 Anderlecht – Zulte-Waregem

== Belgian Cup Final ==
- 2008 Anderlecht – Gent
- 2015 Club Brugge – Anderlecht

== Some of his European matches thus far ==
- the UEFA European Under-17 Football Championship qualification match between Hungary and Switzerland on 24 March 2003.
- the UEFA European Under-17 Football Championship qualification match between Switzerland and Albania on 26 March 2003.
- the 2003–04 UEFA Cup first round match between Dinamo Zagreb and MTK on 24 September 2003.
- the UEFA European Under-19 Football Championship qualification match between Austria and Sweden on 8 October 2003.
- the UEFA European Under-19 Football Championship qualification match between Austria and Kazachstan on 10 October 2003.
- the UEFA Intertoto Cup match between Teplice and Sopron on 27 June 2004.
- the 2004–05 UEFA Champions League second qualifying round match between Trabzonspor and Skonto on 26 August 2004.
- the 2004–05 UEFA Cup second qualifying round match between Rubin Kazan and Rapied Wien on 24 August 2004.
- the UEFA European Under-19 Football Championship qualification match between Croatia and Liechtenstein on 9 October 2004.
- the UEFA European Under-19 Football Championship qualification match between Croatia and Romania on 13 October 2004.
- the Meridian Cup match between Portugal and Nigeria on 4 February 2005.
- the Meridian Cup match between France and Nigeria on 8 February 2005.
- the 2006 FIFA World Cup qualification match between Faroe Islands and Switzerland on 4 June 2005.
- the UEFA Intertoto Cup match between Deportivo La curuña and Newcastle United on 27 June 2005.
- the 2005–06 UEFA Cup first round match between Bayer Leverkusen and CSKA Sofia on 15 September 2005.
- the 2005–06 UEFA Cup group stage match between Middlesbrough and Litex Lovech on 15 December 2005.
- the 2006 UEFA European Under-21 Football Championship qualification match between Bulgaria and Sweden on 25 March 2005.
- the 2006 UEFA European Under-21 Football Championship qualification match between Ukraine and Turkey on 6 September 2005.
- the 2006 UEFA European Under-21 Football Championship qualification play-offs match between Hungary and Italy on 11 November 2005.
- the 2006 UEFA European Under-21 Championship match between Serbia & Montenegro and Germany on 23 May 2006.
- the 2006 UEFA European Under-21 Championship match between Denmark and Netherlands on 26 May 2006.
- the 2006–07 UEFA Champions League second qualifying round match between Sheriff Tiraspol and Spartak Moscow on 2 August 2006.
- the 2007 UEFA European Under-21 Football Championship qualification match between Germany and Romania on 5 September 2006.
- the 2006–07 UEFA Cup first round match between Osasuna and Trabzonspor on 28 September 2006.
- the 2007 UEFA European Under-21 Football Championship qualification play-offs match between Bosnia-Herzegovina and Czech Republic on 10 October 2006.
- the 2006–07 UEFA Cup group stage match between Odense BK and Parma on 19 October 2006.
- the UEFA Euro 2008 qualifying group F match between Liechtenstein and Latvia on 28 March 2007.
- the 2007–08 UEFA Champions League second qualifying round match between Zhenis Astana and Rosenborg on 1 August 2007.
- the 2007–08 UEFA Cup second qualifying round match between CSKA Sofia and Omonia on 30 August 2007.
- the 2007–08 UEFA Cup first round match between Panathinaikos and Artmedia Petrzalka on 2 October 2007.
- the 2007–08 UEFA Cup group stage match between Dinamo Zagreb and Basel on 8 November 2007.
- the 2007–08 UEFA Cup round of 32 match between Braga and Werder Bremen on 21 February 2008.
- the friendly match between Österreich and Nigeria on 27 May 2008.
- the 2008–09 UEFA Champions League second qualifying round match between Fenerbahce SK and MTK on 30 July 2008.
- the 2008–09 UEFA Cup second qualifying round match between AEK and Omonia on 14 August 2008.
- the 2010 FIFA World Cup qualification match between Iceland and Scotland on 10 September 2008.
- the 2008–09 UEFA Cup first round match between Copenhagen and Moscow on 2 October 2008.
- the 2009 UEFA European Under-21 Football Championship qualification play-off match between Switzerland and Spain on 11 October 2008.
- the 2008–09 UEFA Cup group stage match between Portsmouth and Milan on 27 November 2008.
- the 2008–09 UEFA Cup group stage match between Santander and Manchester City on 18 December 2008.
- the 2008–09 UEFA Cup round of 32 match between Kyiv and Valencia on 18 February 2009.
- the 2010 FIFA World Cup qualification match between Russia and Azerbaijan on 28 March 2009.
- the 2009–10 UEFA Champions League second qualifying round match between Baki and Ekranas on 21 July 2009.
- the 2009–10 UEFA Champions League third qualifying round match between M. Haifa and Aktobe on 4 August 2009.
- the 2009–10 UEFA Europa League play-offs qualification round match between Toulouse FC and Trabzonspor on 27 August 2009.
- the 2009–10 UEFA Europa League group stage match between Sporting Club Portugal and Hertha BSC on 1 October 2009.
- the 2010 FIFA World Cup qualification match between Austria and Lithuania on 10 October 2009.
- the 2009–10 UEFA Europa League group stage match between Valencia and Slavia Praha on 22 October 2009.
- the 2009–10 UEFA Europa League group stage match between Athletic Club Bilbao and Werder Bremen on 16 December 2009.
- the 2009–10 UEFA Europa League round of 32 match between Fulham and Shakthar Donetsk on 18 February 2010.
- the 2010–11 UEFA Champions League third qualifying round match between SC Braga and Celtic FC on 28 July 2010.
- the 2010–11 UEFA Europa League play-offs qualification round match between Qarabağ FK and Dortmund on 26 August 2010.
- the 2010–11 UEFA Champions League group stage match between Rangers and Bursaspor on 29 September 2010.
- the UEFA Euro 2012 qualifying group H match between Cyprus and Norway on 8 October 2010.
- the 2010–11 UEFA Champions League group stage match between CFR 1907 Cluj and Bayern Munchen on 3 November 2010.
- the friendly match between Switzerland and Ukraine on 17 November 2010.
- the 2010–11 UEFA Champions League group stage match between Real Madrid and AJ Auxerre on 8 December 2010.
- the 2010–11 UEFA Europa League round of 32 match between Metalist Kharkiv and Bayer Leverkusen on 17 February 2011.
- the 2010–11 UEFA Europa League round of 16 match between SC Braga and F.C. Liverpool on 10 March 2011.
- the UEFA Euro 2012 qualifying group C match between Serbia and Northern Ireland on 25 March 2011.
- the 2010–11 UEFA Europa League quarter-final match between Porto and Spartak Moscow on 7 April 2011.
- the friendly match between Italy and Republic of Ireland on 7 June 2011.
- the 2011–12 UEFA Europa League play-offs qualification round match between FC Sevilla and Hannover 96 on 25 August 2011.
- the 2011–12 UEFA Europa League group stage match between Sporting Club Portugal and S.S Lazio on 29 September 2011.
- the 2011–12 UEFA Europa League group stage match between Maccabi Tel Aviv and Besiktas on 1 December 2011.
- the 2012–13 UEFA Europa League second qualifying round match between St Johnstone and Eskisehirspor on 26 July 2012.
- the 2012–13 UEFA Champions League third qualifying round match between Liberec and Cluj on 8 August 2012.
- the 2012–13 UEFA Europa League play-off round match between Partizan and Tromsø IL on 30 August 2012.
- the 2012–13 UEFA Europa League group stage match between Stuttgart and Steaua on 20 September 2012.
- the 2014 FIFA World Cup qualification match between Belarus and Spain on 12 October 2012.
- the 2012–13 UEFA Europa League group stage match between Mönchengladbach and Marseille on 25 October 2012.
- the 2012–13 UEFA Europa League group stage match between Anzhi and Udinese on 22 November 2012.
- the 2012–13 UEFA Europa League round of 32 match between Metalist and Newcastle on 21 February 2013.
- the 2013–14 UEFA Champions League third qualifying round match between Zenit and Nordsjælland on 7 August 2013.
- the 2013–14 UEFA Europa League group stage match between Valencia and Swansea on 19 September 2013.
- the 2014 FIFA World Cup qualification match between Germany and Ireland on 11 October 2013.
- the 2013–14 UEFA Europa League group stage match between M. Tel-aviv and Eintracht Frankfurt on 7 November 2013.
- the friendly match between The Netherlands and Japan on 16 November 2013.
- the 2013–14 UEFA Europa League group stage match between FC Shakhter Karagandy and PAOK FC on 28 November 2013
- the 2013–14 UEFA Europa League round of 32 match between Real Betis and Rubin Kazan on 20 February 2014.
- the 2014–15 UEFA Europa League third qualifying round match between Asteras and Mainz on 7 August 2014.
- the 2014–15 UEFA Europa League play-off round match between HNK Rijeka and FC Sheriff on 21 August 2014.
- the 2014–15 UEFA Europa League group stage match between Estoril and Panathinaikos on 2 October 2014.
- the UEFA Euro 2016 qualifying match between Belarus and Slovakia on 13 October 2014.
- the 2014–15 UEFA Europa League group stage match between Apollon Limassol and Villarreal on 11 December 2014.
- the UEFA Euro 2016 qualifying match Armenia and Portugal on 13 June 2015.
- the 2015–16 UEFA Champions League third qualifying round match between Dinamo Zagreb and Molde FK on 28 July 2015
- the friendly match between Nigeria and Congo DR on 8 Oktober 2015.
- the friendly match between Gabon and Congo DR on 12 Oktober 2015.
- the 2015–16 UEFA Europa League group stage match between lokomotiv moskva and besiktas on 22 October 2015.
- the 2015–16 UEFA Europa League group stage match between Fenerbahçe SK and Celtic FC on 10 December 2015.
- the friendly match between Germany and Slovakia on 29 May 2016.
- the 2016–17 UEFA Europa League third qualifying round match between M. Tel Aviv and Padurii on 4 August 2016.

== Some of his European matches as fourth official ==
- the 2001 UEFA European Under-21 Football Championship qualification match between Russia and Yugoslavia on 2 June 2001.
- the 2001–02 UEFA Cup second round match between Osijek and AEK on 18 October 2001.
- the 2002–03 UEFA Cup qualifying round match between Crvena Zvezda and Kairat on 29 August 2002.
- the UEFA Euro 2004 qualifying match between Azerbaijan and Wales on 20 November 2002.
- the 2002–03 UEFA Champions League 2nd group stage match between Dortmund and Lokomotiv Moskva on 12 March 2003.
- the UEFA European Under-17 Football Championship qualification match between Switzerland and Greece on 28 March 2003.
- the UEFA Euro 2004 qualifying match between Macedonia and England on 6 September 2003.
- the UEFA European Under-19 Football Championship qualification match between Kazachstan and Sweden on 12 October 2003.
- the 2003–04 UEFA Cup third round match between Benfica and Rosenborg on 26 February 2004.
- the UEFA European Under-19 Football Championship qualification match between Sweden and Croatia on 11 October 2004.
- the Meridian Cup match between Egypt and Portugal on 6 February 2005.
- the Meridian Cup match between Turkey and Cameroon on 11 February 2005.
- the 2006 FIFA World Cup qualification match between Sweden and Bulgaria on 3 September 2005.
- the 2006 UEFA European Under-21 Championship group stage match between Germany and Portugal on 28 May 2006.
- the 2006 UEFA European Under-21 Championship semi final between Serbia & Montenegro and Ukraine on 1 June 2006.
- the 2006–07 UEFA Champions League 1st knockout match between Real Madrid and Bayern Munich on 20 February 2007.
- the 2006–07 UEFA Champions League quarter-final match between Chelsea and Valencia on 4 April 2007.
- the 2007–08 UEFA Champions League quarter-final match between AS Roma and Manchester United on 1 April 2008.
- the 2008–09 UEFA Cup semi-final return leg between Hamburger SV and Werder bremen on 7 May 2009.
- the 2009–10 UEFA Champions League 1st knockout match between Arsenal and Porto on 9 March 2010.
- the 2009–10 UEFA Champions League semi-final return leg match between Barcelona and F.C. Internazionale Milano on 28 April 2010.
- the 2010–11 UEFA Champions League semi-final return leg match between Barcelona and Real Madrid and on 3 May 2011.
- the UEFA Euro 2012 qualifying match between Slovenia and Serbia on 13 October 2011.

== Matches Dutch Eredivisie ==
- 26 February 2005 Twente Enschede – De Graafschap
- 23 October 2005 RKC Waalwijk – Feyenoord
- 11 March 2006 Roda JC Kerkrade – Sparta Rotterdam
- 3 December 2006 Feyenoord – SC Heerenveen
- 15 April 2007 Willem II Tilburg – SC Heerenveen
- 25 November 2007 Sparta Rotterdam – Twente Enschede
- 10 February 2008 Roda JC Kerkrade – AFC Ajax
- 5 April 2008 Willem II Tilburg – SC Heerenveen
- 1 November 2008 NAC Breda – FC Groningen
- 22 February 2009 Sparta Rotterdam – Twente Enschede
- 13 September 2009 Willem II Tilburg – Feyenoord
- 29 January 2010 Willem II Tilburg – RKC Waalwijk
- 20 March 2010 Feyenoord – Vitesse (1st half)
- 31 March 2010 Feyenoord – Vitesse (2nd half)
- 16 October 2010 VVV Venlo – AZ Alkmaar
- 3 April 2011 AFC Ajax – Heracles Almelo
- 18 September 2011 Twente Enschede – ADO Den Haag

== Matches first division of Qatar ==
- 22 September 2007 Al-Rayyan – Al-Sailiya
- 18 March 2011 Al-Arabi Doha – Qatar SC

== Matches first division of Saudi Arabia ==
- 5 December 2009 Al Ittihad – Al Ahli
- 16 December 2011 Al Shabab – Al Ahli
- 25 March 2012 Al Quadisiya – Al Ahli
- 22 March 2014 Al RAED – AL TAAWON
