= 2007 UEFA–CAF Meridian Cup =

European Selection U-18	African Selection U-18
UEFA	CAF
10	1

First leg
European Selection U-18	African Selection U-18
6	1
- Date: 27 February 2007
- Venue: Mini Estadi, Barcelona
- Referee: Kacem Bennaceur

Second leg
African Selection U-18	European Selection U-18
0	4
- Date: 1 March 2007
- Venue: Mini Estadi, Barcelona
- Referee: Thomas Einwaller

The 2007 UEFA–CAF Meridian Cup was the sixth UEFA–CAF Meridian Cup, an intercontinental football competition for the representative under-18 teams of Europe and Africa. The competition, being held as a two-legged tie for the first time, was played in Barcelona, Spain, on 27 February and 1 March 2007. This was the first Meridian Cup under a new format; the two confederations were pitted against each other, whereas in past tournaments individual countries from said confederations competed.

== Squads ==
=== Africa ===
Note: Flags indicate national team as defined under FIFA eligibility rules; some limited exceptions apply. Players may hold more than one non-FIFA nationality.

No.	Pos.	Nation	Player
1	GK	CIV	Christian Fabrice Okoua
2	DF	GAM	Steevy Nzambe
3	DF	CIV	Konan Ruffin N'Gouan
4	DF	BFA	Mahamadi Bande
5	DF	RSA	Ramahlwe Mphahlele
6	DF	CTA	Junior Maurice Gourrier
7	MF	ERI	Samuel Gebrehiwet
8	MF	CMR	Aser Pierrick Dipanda
9	FW	GAB	Ulrich Boucka
10	FW	CMR	Lionnel Franck Djimgou

No.	Pos.	Nation	Player
11	FW	CMR	Etienne Emmanuel Eto'o
12	GK	ERI	Yosief Zeratsion
13	MF	GHA	Felix Mensah Donkor
14	DF	MAR	Saddik Boulaouali
15	FW	ALG	Mohamed Fadel
16	DF	SEN	Kemokho Cissokho
17	FW	SEN	Serigne Amath Gueye
19	FW	MLI	Boubacar Bangoura
21	GK	TUN	Habib Tounsi
22	MF	SEN	Cheick Sy

=== Europe ===
Note: Flags indicate national team as defined under FIFA eligibility rules; some limited exceptions apply. Players may hold more than one non-FIFA nationality.

No.	Pos.	Nation	Player
1	GK	RUS	Yevgeny Pomazan
2	DF	GER	Björn Kopplin
3	DF	CZE	Jan Polák
4	MF	ISR	Dor Malul
5	MF	CZE	Jan Hable
6	MF	SRB	Nikola Gulan
7	MF	GER	Marko Marin
8	MF	HUN	Ádám Dudás
9	FW	RUS	Aleksandr Prudnikov
10	FW	ESP	Aarón Ñíguez

No.	Pos.	Nation	Player
11	FW	HUN	Krisztián Németh
12	GK	POL	Wojciech Szczęsny
13	DF	FRA	Armand Traoré
14	DF	NIR	Craig Cathcart
15	DF	ESP	Guillem Savall
16	FW	ESP	Bojan Krkić
17	MF	POR	Romeu Ribeiro
18	FW	GER	Manuel Fischer
19	MF	SRB	Nenad Adamović
20	MF	NED	Vurnon Anita

== First leg ==
27 February 2007
18:30 CET

European Selection U-18	6–1	African Selection U-18
Aarón 3', 26'; Fischer 22', 38'; Bojan 61'; Prudnikov 89'	Report	Dipanda 45+2'

Mini Estadi, Barcelona
Referee: Kacem Bennaceur (Tunisia)

== Second leg ==
1 March 2007
11:00 CET

African Selection U-18	0–4	European Selection U-18
	Report	Németh 41'; Fischer 64'; Prudnikov 73'; Ádám Dudás 90+1'

Mini Estadi, Barcelona
Referee: Thomas Einwaller (Austria)
