= 2010–11 Blackpool F.C. season =

English football club season

Blackpool F.C.
2010–11 season
- Owner: Owen Oyston
- Chairman: Karl Oyston (stepped down from 18 August until January)
- Manager: Ian Holloway
- Stadium: Bloomfield Road
- Premier League: 19th (relegated)
- FA Cup: Third round
- League Cup: Second round
- Top goalscorer: League: DJ Campbell (13); All: DJ Campbell; Charlie Adam (13)
- Highest home attendance: 16,116 vs Manchester City, Premier League, 17 October 2010
- Lowest home attendance: 14,550 vs Birmingham City, Premier League, 4 January 2011
- Average home league attendance: 15,780
Home colours	Away colours	Third colours

The 2010–11 season was Blackpool F.C.'s debut season in the Premier League, after winning the 2009–10 Championship play-off final in what was their 99th consecutive season in the Football League. It was also their 28th overall season in English football's top tier, but their first since 1971. It was Ian Holloway's second season as manager. The club finished 19th and were relegated back to the Championship.

== Season summary ==
The talk during the build-up to the new season was mainly centred around the club's lack of activity in the transfer market. Indeed, 81 days passed between the play-off final and the first arrivals at Bloomfield Road for the forthcoming season. After the release of five players, plus the sale of Ben Burgess to Notts County and the forced retirement of Stephen McPhee, coupled with the departure of the five loan players who finished the 2009–10 campaign at the club, Ian Holloway had just fifteen senior players at his disposal. On 11 August, however, the club replaced those five players with a quintet of new faces. A sixth, Chris Basham from Bolton Wanderers, followed two days later.

On 18 August, Israeli international centre-back Dekel Keinan was finally able to complete a deal that was set up earlier in the close season, after receiving his work permit. He arrived on a free transfer, but he left the club for Cardiff City in the January transfer window.

Several players, including Gary Taylor-Fletcher, Jason Euell and Charlie Adam, kept the squad number assigned to them for the 2009–10 season despite their number not falling inside the traditional 1 to 11. Paul Rachubka retained the number 1 shirt despite being second choice to Matthew Gilks the previous campaign and the start of the new one.

On 1 September, the club submitted their squad (of 24, not the maximum 25) to the Premier League.

=== Pre-season ===
In July, Blackpool partook in the pre-season South West Challenge Cup, in Devon, and won the competition.

=== Season proper ===
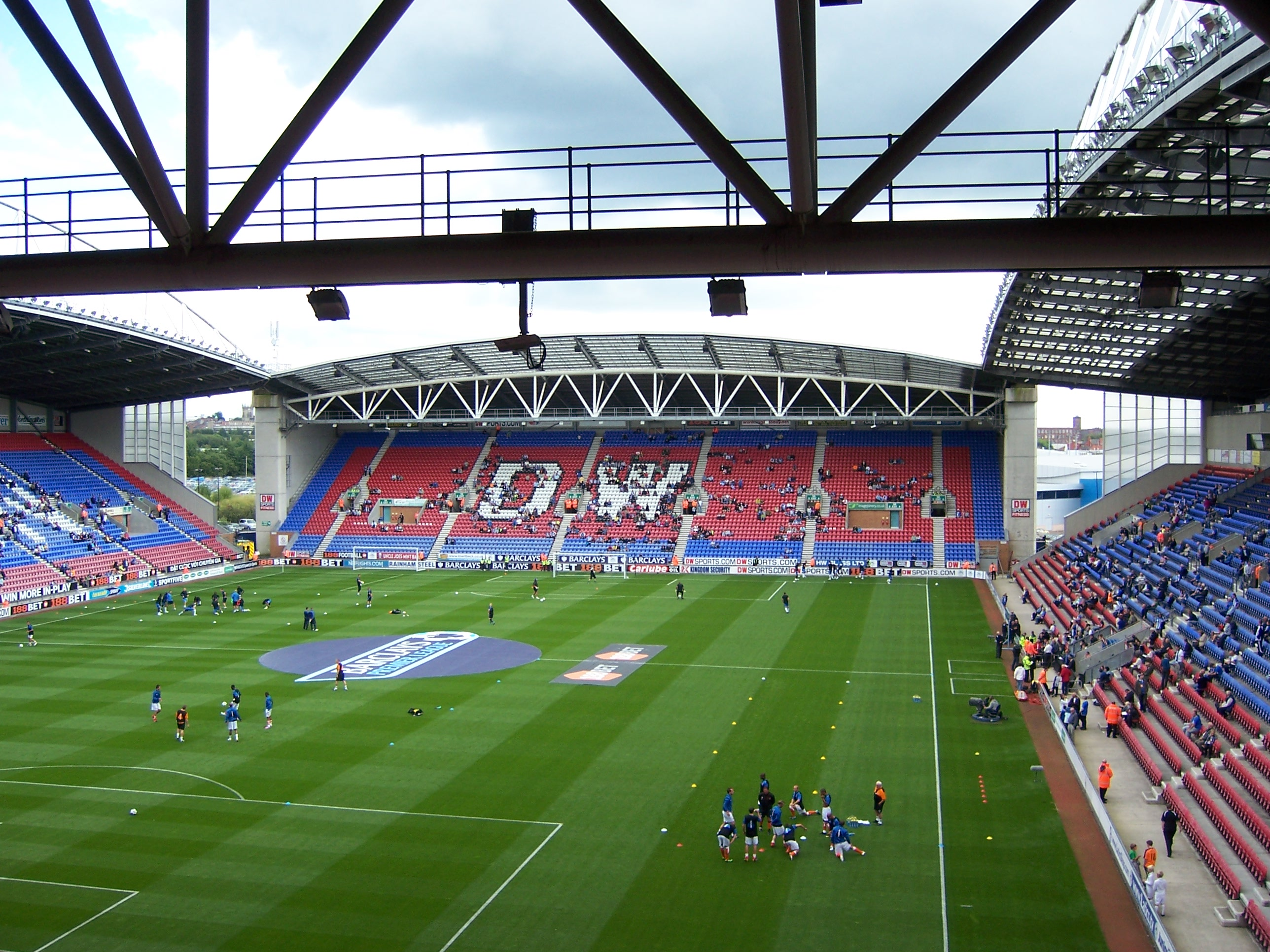
Build-up to kick-off at Wigan Athletic's DW Stadium in Blackpool's first-ever fixture in the Premier League

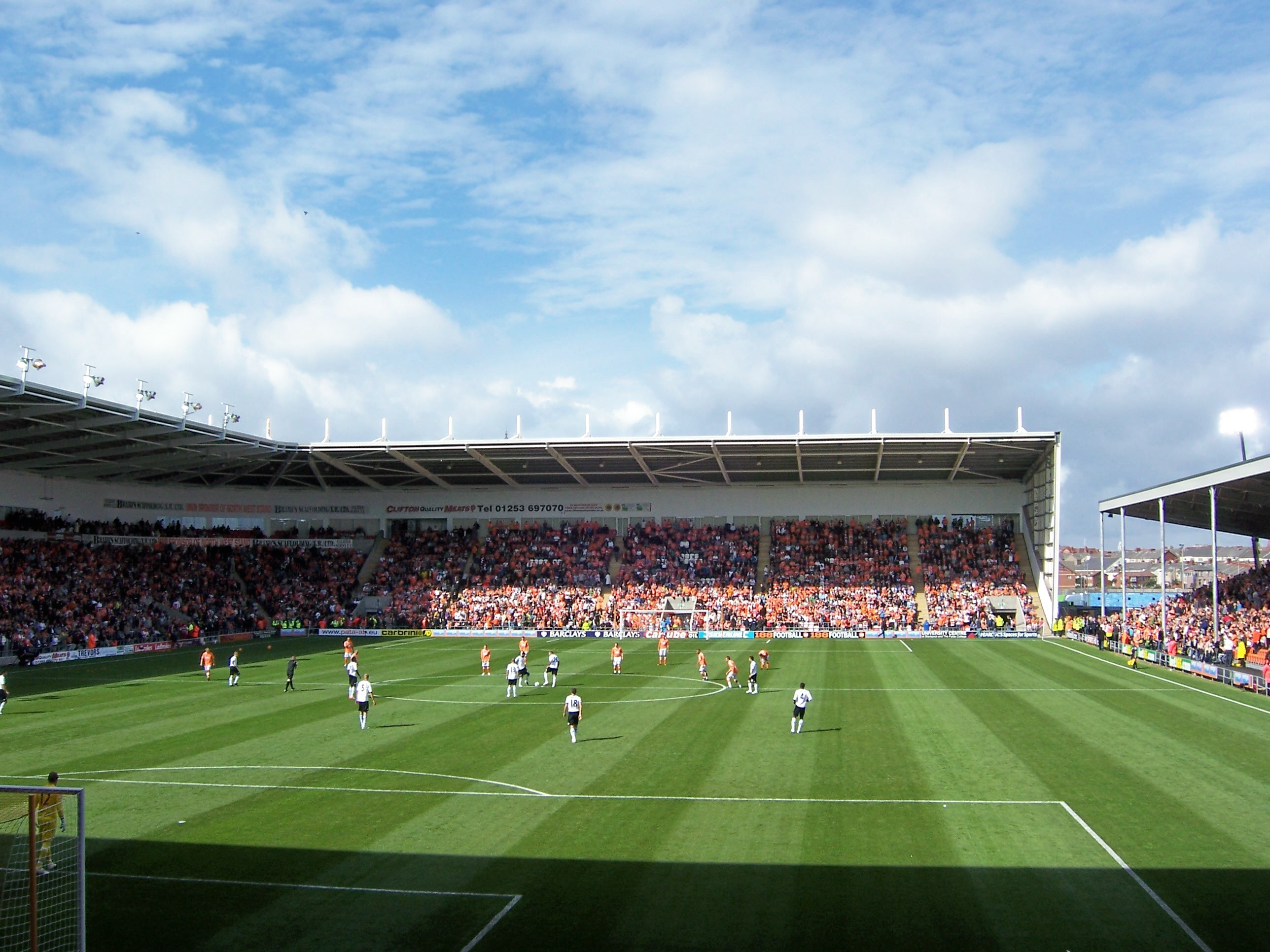
Kick off in the first home Premier League fixture, against Fulham

Following an opening-day 4–0 win over Wigan Athletic at the DW Stadium on 14 August, a result that briefly put them top of the entire English football pyramid for the first time since the opening day of the 1957–58 season, Blackpool earned the League Managers Association's "Performance of the Week Award".

Seven days later, they suffered their first defeat, 6–0 at Arsenal. Theo Walcott opened the scoring on twelve minutes. Just after the half-hour mark, Ian Evatt brought down Marouane Chamakh inches outside the penalty area, but the referee, Mike Jones, awarded a penalty and dismissed the Blackpool defender. Andrei Arshavin doubled the Gunners' lead from the spot. Walcott netted his second of the half to make it 3–0 at the break. Abou Diaby made it 4–0 four minutes after the restart, and Walcott completed his hat-trick inside an hour. Chamakh completed the scoring with seven minutes remaining. The result saw Blackpool drop to tenth place in the table.

On 24 August, Blackpool were knocked out of the League Cup in the second round by MK Dons.

Three days later, Luke Varney joined Blackpool on a season-long loan from Derby County, with a view to a permanent deal. Varney scored on his debut in the following day's fixture: a 2–2 draw with Fulham at Bloomfield Road, in what was the first-ever Premier League game played at the ground.

As the first transfer window of the season came to a close, four players were added to the squad. On deadline day itself, Matt Phillips arrived from Wycombe Wanderers for a £325,000 fee. The same day, the club tied-up the deal that had been hinted at since the end of the previous campaign. DJ Campbell, whose hat-trick in the second leg of the play-off semi-final against Nottingham Forest helped put Blackpool in the final, was signed on a permanent basis after his two loan spells during the 2009–10 campaign. On 1 September, the Seasiders also finalised deals with Australian midfielder David Carney and Ghanaian goalkeeper Richard Kingson, giving Ian Holloway thirty available players to work with until January.

After a two-week international break, Blackpool returned to Premier League duty on 11 September with a visit to Newcastle United. A penalty from Charlie Adam just before half-time was the difference until DJ Campbell, with his first goal as a permanent Blackpool player, scored in injury time to seal the Tangerines' second Premier League victory in four games. The result put them fourth in the table, behind Chelsea, Arsenal and Manchester United.

Eight days later, they made their second trip to the capital in a month, where they faced Chelsea. Salomon Kalou opened the scoring for the hosts inside two minutes, and ten minutes later Florent Malouda doubled the lead. Didier Drogba made it 3–0 on the half-hour, before Malouda netted his second four minutes before the break to complete the scoring.

On 25 September, Blackpool faced Blackburn Rovers at Bloomfield Road in only their second home Premier League game of the opening six. The fixture saw Blackburn manager Sam Allardyce's first return to the club since his sacking fourteen years earlier. Charlie Adam gave Rovers the lead with an own-goal after twenty minutes, and that is how the score remained until the 85th, when Matt Phillips equalised one minute after coming on as substitute for Neal Eardley. Brett Emerton scored the winner for Rovers three minutes into injury time.

Eight days later, Blackpool faced Liverpool at Anfield for the first time in a league game since 9 January 1971. Charlie Adam put the visitors ahead with a 29th-minute penalty after Luke Varney was felled by Glen Johnson. It was Varney himself who doubled Blackpool's lead in first-half injury time. Sotirios Kyrgiakos gave the hosts hope with a header on 53 minutes, but the Seasiders held on for their third victory in seven Premier League outings.

After another international break, Blackpool played only their third home Premier League match of the season, against Manchester City. Carlos Tevez put the visitors ahead after 67 minutes. Marlon Harewood, on as substitute for Elliot Grandin, restored parity with his first goal at Bloomfield Road as a Blackpool player. Tevez put City ahead again after 79 minutes, before David Silva extended the lead in the final minute. Gary Taylor-Fletcher pulled one back three minutes into injury time, but Roberto Mancini's side held on for the three points.

On 23 October, Blackpool faced Birmingham City at St Andrew's. Liam Ridgewell put the Blues ahead after 34 minutes. A Charlie Adam error inside the visitors' six-yard box allowed Nikola Žigić to double their lead just before the hour mark, and that is how the score remained. It was Blackpool's fourth defeat in five Premier League games.

Blackpool obtained their fourth Premier League victory on 1 November with a 2–1 result against West Bromwich Albion at Bloomfield Road. It was their first home win of the campaign. The visitors were reduced to nine men inside half an hour. Charlie Adam, with his third league goal of the season, put Blackpool ahead from the penalty spot on twelve minutes. Luke Varney doubled the lead just after the hour mark, also his third of the campaign, before the Baggies scored what proved to be a consolation goal six minutes from time. The result moved Blackpool up to ninth in the table.

Everton were the visitors to Bloomfield Road on 6 November. Neal Eardley gave the Tangerines the lead with a free-kick on ten minutes. It was his first goal for the Seasiders since his move from Oldham Athletic at the start of the previous season. David Moyes' men hit back three minutes later with a header from Tim Cahill. Blackpool re-took the lead three minutes into the second half via David Vaughan, with his first goal of the season. The lead, once again, lasted only a few minutes. Séamus Coleman, making his first appearance against Blackpool since he helped the club to promotion during his loan spell the previous season, stroked the ball under the body of Matthew Gilks. It was his first League goal for the Toffees. With a point, Blackpool dropped two places to eleventh.

Four days later, Blackpool travelled to Villa Park to take on Aston Villa. Ian Holloway made ten changes to the team that faced Everton, with only Keith Southern retaining his place. Richard Kingson was given a debut in goal, and there was a rare start for club captain Jason Euell. Villa opened the scoring just before the half-hour through Stewart Downing. Marlon Harewood put Blackpool level in first-half injury time, his fourth of the Premier League campaign. Nathan Delfouneso restored Villa's lead on the hour mark, but three minutes from time, substitute DJ Campbell found the net for the first time in two months to level the score again. Two minutes later, however, James Collins scored what proved to be the winner. The defeat, their third in five games, saw Blackpool slip two places to fourteenth.

West Ham United were the opposition on 13 November. In front of a crowd of 31,000 at Upton Park, the two teams held out for a goalless draw, a result that dropped Blackpool a place in the table to fifteenth. Blackpool goalkeeper Matthew Gilks injured his patella during the match, and was replaced by Richard Kingson. Gilks subsequently missed much of the remainder of the season. After stirring-up controversy with his team selection in the previous match, Ian Holloway made eleven changes to the team that started against Aston Villa.

Seven days later, Wolverhampton Wanderers visited the seaside. In front of the watching Prince William, Luke Varney put the Tangerines ahead with a "spectacular" long-range volley. Marlon Harewood doubled their lead just before half-time. It was Harewood's fifth league goal of the season, and made him the club's top scorer. Kevin Doyle pulled one back for Wolves in the final minutes, but Blackpool held on for the victory. The three points moved the Seasiders up four places to eleventh.

November was closed out with a short trip to the Reebok Stadium to face Bolton Wanderers. Ian Evatt opened his account for the season with a header from Elliot Grandin's 28th-minute corner. Luke Varney doubled the visitors' lead twelve minutes into the second half with his fifth League goal of the season, which made him the club's joint-top scorer with Marlon Harewood. Martin Petrov volleyed home a reply for Bolton on 76 minutes. With one minute to go, Mark Davies completed the hosts' comeback. The match finished 2–2, a result that lifted Blackpool two places to tenth.

After a two-week break due to their scheduled home fixture against Manchester United being postponed due to a frozen Bloomfield Road pitch, Blackpool travelled to Stoke City on 11 December. DJ Campbell's third goal of the season on 48 minutes proved to be the winner. The result moved the visitors up to ninth in the table, but they dropped one place by the end of the day.

Their two subsequent home fixtures – against Tottenham Hotspur on 19 December and Liverpool seven days later – were postponed, the first due to unsafe conditions around the stadium and the second due to a frozen pitch. As a result, Blackpool slipped into the bottom half of the table.

On 28 December, after seventeen days without a game, Blackpool travelled to face Sunderland at the Stadium of Light, their first-ever visit to the ground and their first league fixture against Sunderland in 22 years. DJ Campbell opened the scoring five minutes into the second half. The forward, who was once signed to Birmingham by Sunderland manager Steve Bruce, doubled the visitors' lead in injury time with his fifth goal of the season, joining Marlon Harewood and Luke Varney at the top of the club's scoring chart. The Seasiders, who were without the suspended Charlie Adam, moved up three places to eighth with their victory, their fifth on the road.

Blackpool rang in the new year with a visit to the City of Manchester Stadium to face Manchester City, their first return fixture of the campaign. Adam Johnson put the hosts ahead on 34 minutes with a shot from the edge of the box that deflected off Stephen Crainey's leg. Less than a minute later, Luke Varney brought down Carlos Tevez in the area to give away a penalty; however, the Argentine put the ball wide of Richard Kingson's right-hand post to keep the score 1–0. City held on for the remainder of the game to complete their double over the Seasiders and inflict only Blackpool's second defeat in nine matches. Blackpool dropped two places to tenth after the result.

A second-successive defeat ensued three days later when Birmingham City visited Bloomfield Road for what was Blackpool's first home game in seven weeks. Alexander Hleb put City ahead after 24 minutes. DJ Campbell equalised 23 minutes into the second half, making himself the club's outright leading goalscorer for the campaign, before Scott Dann scored what proved to be the winner on 89 minutes. Blackpool remained eleventh in the table despite the reversal.

At the halfway stage of their Premier League season, Blackpool had played nineteen games, of which they had won seven, drawn four and lost eight, giving them 25 points. They had gained victories over Wigan Athletic (away), Newcastle United (away), Liverpool (away), West Bromwich Albion (home), Wolves (home), Stoke City (away) and Sunderland (away). Draws had occurred against Fulham (home), Everton (home), West Ham (away) and Bolton Wanderers (away). Their defeats came at the hands of Arsenal (away), Chelsea (away), Blackburn Rovers (home), Manchester City (home and away), Birmingham City (away and home) and Aston Villa (away).

Blackpool's FA Cup campaign ended where it started after a 2–0 defeat at Southampton on 8 January. Ian Holloway made nine changes to the team that started against Birmingham City – with only Neal Eardley and Matt Phillips retaining their places – as a weakened team was fielded for the third-round tie.

Premier League duty resumed on 12 January, with a midweek visit of Liverpool to Bloomfield Road, a rescheduled fixture after the previous month's postponement. It was returning Liverpool manager Kenny Dalglish's first League game in charge of the Anfield club. Fernando Torres put the visitors ahead on three minutes. Gary Taylor-Fletcher, a self-confessed Liverpool fan, equalised nine minutes later. DJ Campbell put the Seasiders ahead with a 69th-minute header, his fifth goal in five League games and seventh overall for the season, and it proved to be the game-winner. It completed Blackpool's first double over Liverpool since the 1946–47 campaign, shortly before the Reds won their fifth First Division championship, and it elevated them to ninth place in the table.

A defeat, at West Bromwich Albion, ensued on 15 January. David Vaughan opened the scoring on eleven minutes, with his second goal of the campaign. Peter Odemwingie equalised for the Baggies eight minutes before the break. James Morrison put the hosts ahead for the first time on 52 minutes, but Gary Taylor-Fletcher brought the Seasiders level, with his second goal in as many games, with ten minutes remaining. Odemwingie scored his second and West Brom's third with three minutes of normal time remaining, and Roberto Di Matteo's men held on for the three points. It was the tenth time this season that Blackpool have conceded a goal in the final ten minutes of a Premier League game. Seven of these occurrences saw them drop points by doing so.

On 21 January, Dekel Keinan left Bloomfield Road for Cardiff City after finding his chances with the Seasiders limited due to the pairing of Ian Evatt and Craig Cathcart in central defence.

The following day, Blackpool hosted Sunderland at Bloomfield Road. Kieran Richardson scored twice in the first half, before a second-half Charlie Adam penalty, to give the Wearsiders the three points. It was Blackpool's fourth Premier League defeat in five games and saw them drop one place to eleventh.

On 25 January, Manchester United visited Bloomfield Road for the first time since 1975 for a rescheduled fixture after their December postponement. Former United player Craig Cathcart put the Seasiders ahead with a 15th-minute header from a Charlie Adam corner. DJ Campbell doubled their lead two minutes before the break with his eighth goal of the campaign. Dimitar Berbatov, fresh off a hat-trick over Birmingham the previous weekend, pulled one back for Sir Alex Ferguson's side on 72 minutes. Javier Hernández levelled proceedings two minutes later, and Berbatov completed the comeback to score with two minutes of normal time remaining. Ten minutes of injury time were played, but United held on for a victory that put them five points clear at the top of the table. Blackpool, meanwhile, remained twelfth.

On 27 January 2011, the Premier League fined Blackpool £25,000 for fielding what they believed to be a weakened team against Aston Villa on 10 November. The club had fourteen days to appeal the decision, but decided not to, for fear of being docked points.

On the same day, after suffering six defeats in seven games, Ian Holloway brought in Moroccan defender Salaheddine Sbaï on loan from Nîmes until the end of the season, with an option to extend the deal for another year in the summer.

Four days later, on transfer-deadline day, Blackpool signed Andy Reid from Sunderland for an undisclosed fee until the end of the season. He was joined by loan signings James Beattie from Rangers, Jason Puncheon from Southampton, and Sergei Kornilenko from Zenit Saint Petersburg.

On 2 February, Blackpool hosted bottom club West Ham. Victor Obinna put Avram Grant's team ahead in the 24th minute. Robbie Keane, who joined the Hammers on loan from Tottenham two days earlier, doubled the visitors' lead after 36 minutes. Charlie Adam pulled one back with his first goal of the season from open play, but Obinna got his second and West Ham's third just before the break. It proved to be the final goal of the game. West Ham moved off the foot of the table, while Blackpool dropped one place to thirteenth.

Three days later, Blackpool travelled to Goodison Park to take on Everton. Louis Saha opened the scoring after nineteen minutes. Alex Baptiste, with his second goal of the campaign, levelled matters on 37. Two minutes after the break, Saha got his and the Toffees' second. Jason Puncheon, on his full debut for the Seasiders, equalised just after the hour mark. Two minutes later, Charlie Adam put Blackpool ahead for the first time with a diving header after DJ Campbell's strike came back off the underside of the crossbar. Saha completed his hat-trick on 76 minutes to restore the balance. Jermaine Beckford put David Moyes' side ahead again in the 80th minute, before Saha scored his fourth and Everton's fifth to round out the scoring. Blackpool, with their fifth successive Premier League defeat and their eighth game of nine overall, dropped two places to 15th.

On 12 January, the Tangerines hosted Aston Villa. The visitors' Gabriel Agbonlahor opened the scoring in the tenth minute, but Elliot Grandin, with his first goal for Blackpool, equalised matters four minutes later. Grandin, however, limped off injured six minutes before the break. The match finished 1–1, stemming Blackpool's run of defeats, but they dropped one place to sixteenth, their lowest placing of the season to date.

Ten days later, Blackpool welcomed Tottenham Hotspur, conquerors of Milan the previous week, to the seaside for their fixture rescheduled from 19 December. Charlie Adam put the Seasiders ahead from the penalty spot on eighteen minutes after DJ Campbell was felled in the box. It was Adam's eighth overall goal of the campaign, his sixth from the spot. Campbell himself doubled the lead just before the break, volleying in James Beattie's cross from the right, for his ninth goal of the season. Substitute Brett Ormerod made it 3–0 ten minutes from time with his first League goal of the season. With that strike, Ormerod became the first Blackpool player to have scored in all four top divisions of English football. Roman Pavlyuchenko pulled one back for Harry Redknapp's men three minutes into injury time. Blackpool would have jumped five places to eleventh if they had kept the clean sheet, but instead had to settle for twelfth.

On 25 February, Marlon Harewood joined Barnsley on loan until the end of the season in a bid to get more playing time.

The following day, Blackpool travelled to bottom club Wolves. With Charlie Adam sitting out the first of two games due to suspension, having picked up ten disciplinary points, David Vaughan captained the Seasiders. Matthew Jarvis put Wanderers ahead inside two minutes. Blackpool were reduced to ten men when DJ Campbell was dismissed for violent conduct before half-time. Jamie O'Hara doubled Wolves' lead on 54 minutes, before a Sylvan Ebanks-Blake double rounded out the scoring. With their defeat, Blackpool dropped two places to fourteenth.

Nine days later, Chelsea, fresh off a victory over Manchester United less than a week earlier, visited Bloomfield Road. Former England captain John Terry opened the scoring for the visitors with a 20th-minute header. Frank Lampard doubled their lead with a penalty after Ian Evatt fouled Salomon Kalou in the box. Lampard got his and Chelsea's third four minutes later. Jason Puncheon pulled one back for Blackpool, who were without Charlie Adam, on 86 minutes. Richard Kingson left the field with a hamstring injury after Chelsea's second goal. He was replaced by Mark Halstead, who became the fourth goalkeeper used by Blackpool during the campaign. With their defeat, Blackpool remained fifteenth.

On 19 March, after an 11-day break, Blackpool travelled to Lancashire neighbours Blackburn Rovers. A first-half Charlie Adam double gave the visitors the half-time lead; however, strikes from Christopher Samba and, in injury time, Junior Hoilett, meant the honours were shared. Blackpool remained fifteenth, with eight League games remaining.

After a two-week break, due to FA Cup and international football, Blackpool travelled to London to face Fulham. A Bobby Zamora double inside half an hour, plus a second-half strike by Dickson Etuhu, condemned Ian Holloway's men to their eighth defeat in eleven Premier League games. They had dropped two places to 17th – one place and one point above the relegation zone – during their break, and they remained there with this defeat.

A second-successive Sunday afternoon fixture ensued against Arsenal at Bloomfield Road, the first of four home games in a row for Blackpool. Abou Diaby opened the scoring for the Gunners on 18 minutes. Emmanuel Eboué doubled the visitors' lead three minutes later. Gary Taylor-Fletcher brought the Tangerines back into the game seven minutes into the second half, but Robin van Persie sealed the points for Arsenal, who remained seven points behind leaders Manchester United. Blackpool, meanwhile, remained seventeenth.

On 16 April, Blackpool hosted Wigan Athletic. The home side conceded a goal inside three minutes, scored by Hugo Rodallega, after a wayward free-kick and subsequent slip by Craig Cathcart. Charles N'Zogbia doubled the lead in first-half injury time. Neal Eardley deflected in a third for the visitors, before DJ Campbell netted a consolation, his tenth goal of the League campaign. With the defeat, Blackpool dropped into the relegation zone for the first time.

A week later, Newcastle United visited Bloomfield Road, looking to avenge their defeat at St. James' Park earlier in the season. A wreath in memory of former Blackpool player and manager Allan Brown, who died earlier in the week, was laid behind the South Stand goal. Peter Løvenkrands put Alan Pardew's men ahead in the seventeenth minute. DJ Campbell equalised fifteen minutes later. The match finished 1–1. With the point, the Seasiders moved out of the relegation zone, on goal difference, at the expense of Wigan Athletic, who lost 4–2 at Sunderland.

On 30 April, Blackpool took on Stoke City at Bloomfield Road. A goalless draw ensued – the first clean sheet seen at the ground this season. Blackpool remained seventeenth, after Wigan Athletic drew at Everton.

Blackpool travelled to White Hart Lane on 7 May to face Tottenham Hotspur. The Seasiders had slipped into the relegation zone earlier in the day after Wigan Athletic drew with Aston Villa. Charlie Adam put the visitors ahead with a 76th-minute penalty, his eleventh goal of the season, less than a minute after missing from the spot. Jermain Defoe equalised in the final minute of normal time. With the draw, Blackpool edged out of the relegation zone again, but they dropped into it again the following day, when Wolves beat West Brom.

Seven days later, Blackpool played their final home fixture of the campaign. Bolton Wanderers were the visitors, and it was they who took the lead, in the sixth minute, via Kevin Davies. DJ Campbell equalised three minutes later, before Jason Puncheon put the hosts ahead just inside twenty minutes. Bolton pulled level five minutes later with a strike from Matthew Taylor. Just before the break, Campbell put Blackpool back in front with his second of the game and 13th of the campaign. On 63 minutes, Charlie Adam fired in his eleventh League goal for what proved to be the winner. It was a repeat scoreline of the 1953 "Matthews Final", and the late winger's first and last club, Stoke City, appeared in their first FA Cup Final, against Manchester City, later in the day. It was Blackpool's first victory for three months; however, they remained in the relegation zone after Wolves won 3–1 at Sunderland.

On 22 May, exactly 365 days since their Wembley promotion, Blackpool travelled to Old Trafford to face Manchester United, who were crowned champions a week earlier with their draw at Blackburn Rovers. In front of 75,000 fans, Park Ji-sung put the home side ahead after 21 minutes. Charlie Adam equalised with a free-kick just under 20 minutes later. It was the Scot's thirteenth goal of the campaign, in all competitions, making him the club's joint-top-scorer with DJ Campbell. Blackpool went ahead 12 minutes into the second half, via Gary Taylor-Fletcher. United pulled level on 74 minutes, when Ian Evatt sliced the ball into his own net. Substitute Michael Owen scored what proved to be the final goal of the game with nine minutes of normal time remaining. The result, combined with favourable results for Wolves and Wigan, meant Blackpool finished in nineteenth position and were relegated, by one point and three goals, back to The Championship. They were joined by West Ham, who were relegated the previous week, and Birmingham City.

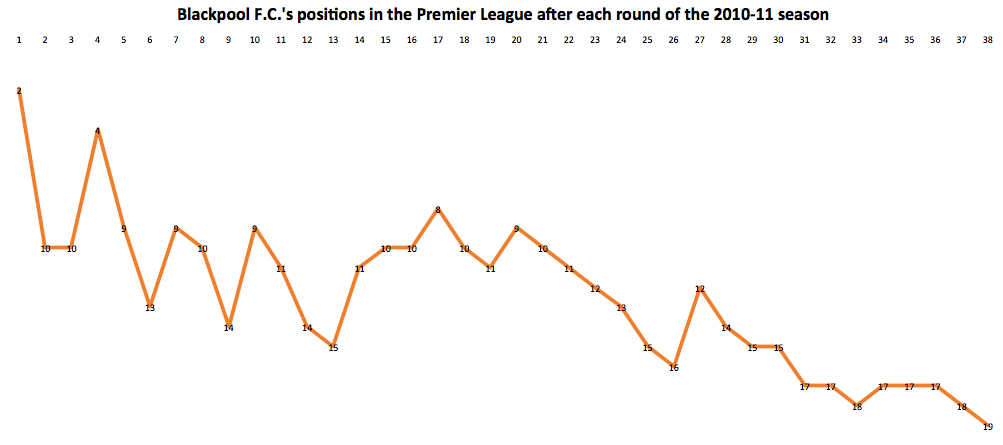
Blackpool F.C.'s positions in the Premier League after each round of the 2010–11 season.

At the end of the campaign, nine players were released. These were goalkeepers Paul Rachubka and Richard Kingson, defenders Danny Coid, Rob Edwards and David Carney, midfielders Malaury Martin, Ishmel Demontagnac and Jason Euell, and forward Marlon Harewood. On-loan Salaheddine Sbaï was not taken on permanently, while Andy Reid's season-long deal was not extended. Meanwhile, twelve-month options were activated on seven players: defenders Neal Eardley and Ian Evatt, midfielders Charlie Adam, Keith Southern and Gary Taylor-Fletcher, and forwards Billy Clarke and Louis Almond. Six players were offered new contracts. These were goalkeepers Matt Gilks and Mark Halstead, defenders Stephen Crainey and Ashley Eastham, midfielder David Vaughan, and forward Brett Ormerod. Ormerod accepted a one-year contract, but Vaughan turned down his offer, stating that he wanted to continue playing in the Premier League.

== Transfers ==
=== In ===
==== Summer ====
Date	Player	Position	From	Fee	Source
11 August 2010	Craig Cathcart	DF	Manchester United	Undisclosed	
11 August 2010	Ludovic Sylvestre	MF	Mladá Boleslav	Undisclosed	
11 August 2010	Elliot Grandin	MF	CSKA Sofia	Undisclosed	
11 August 2010	Malaury Martin	MF	Monaco	Free	
11 August 2010	Marlon Harewood	FW	Aston Villa	Free	
13 August 2010	Chris Basham	MF	Bolton Wanderers	Undisclosed	
18 August 2010	Dekel Keinan	DF	Maccabi Haifa	Free	
27 August 2010	Luke Varney	FW	Derby County	Season-long loan	
31 August 2010	Matt Phillips	MF	Wycombe Wanderers	£700,000	
31 August 2010	DJ Campbell	FW	Leicester City	£1,750,000	
1 September 2010	David Carney	MF	Twente	Undisclosed	
2 September 2010	Richard Kingson	GK	Wigan Athletic	Free	

==== January ====
Date	Player	Position	From	Fee	Source
27 January 2011	Salaheddine Sbaï	DF	Nîmes	Season-long loan	
31 January 2011	Sergei Kornilenko	FW	Zenit Saint Petersburg	Season-long loan	
31 January 2011	Jason Puncheon	MF	Southampton	Season-long loan	
31 January 2011	Andy Reid	MF	Sunderland	Until the end of the season	
31 January 2011	James Beattie	FW	Rangers	Season-long loan	

=== Out ===
==== Summer ====
Date	Player	Position	To	Fee	Source
26 May 2010	Stephen McPhee	FW	Retirement	Free	
30 June 2010	Al Bangura	MF	Released	Free	
30 June 2010	Hamer Bouazza	MF	Released	Free	
30 June 2010	Joseph Martin	MF	Released	Free	
30 June 2010	Danny Mitchley	FW	Released	Free	
30 June 2010	Daniel Nardiello	FW	Released	Free	
2 July 2010	Ben Burgess	FW	Notts County	Free	
12 November 2010	Danny Coid	DF	Rotherham United	Loan until 15 January 2011	
12 November 2010	Mark Halstead	GK	Barrow	One-month loan	
25 November 2010	Ashley Eastham	DF	Carlisle United	One-month loan	

==== January ====
Date	Player	Position	To	Fee	Source
2 January 2011	Louis Almond	FW	Barrow	One-month loan	
7 January 2011	Ishmel Demontagnac	MF	Stockport County	One-month loan	
7 January 2011	Stephen Husband	MF	Stockport County	One-month loan	
18 January 2011	Mark Halstead	GK	Kettering Town	One-month loan	
21 January 2011	Dekel Keinan	DF	Cardiff City	Undisclosed	
17 February 2011	Jason Euell	FW	Doncaster Rovers	Season-long loan	
26 February 2011	Marlon Harewood	FW	Barnsley	Season-long loan	

== First-team squad ==
Squad at end of season

Note: Flags indicate national team as defined under FIFA eligibility rules; some limited exceptions apply. Players may hold more than one non-FIFA nationality.

No.	Pos.	Nation	Player
1	GK	ENG	Paul Rachubka
2	DF	ENG	Danny Coid
3	DF	SCO	Stephen Crainey
4	MF	ENG	Keith Southern
5	DF	WAL	Neal Eardley
6	DF	ENG	Ian Evatt
9	FW	ENG	Marlon Harewood
10	FW	ENG	Brett Ormerod
11	MF	WAL	David Vaughan
12	MF	ENG	Gary Taylor-Fletcher
13	GK	ENG	Mark Halstead
14	MF	FRA	Elliot Grandin
15	DF	ENG	Alex Baptiste
16	FW	ENG	Luke Varney (on loan from Derby County)
17	MF	ENG	Chris Basham
18	FW	JAM	Jason Euell
19	MF	FRA	Ludovic Sylvestre
20	DF	NIR	Craig Cathcart

No.	Pos.	Nation	Player
21	GK	SCO	Matt Gilks
23	MF	ENG	Matt Phillips
24	DF	WAL	Rob Edwards
26	MF	SCO	Charlie Adam (captain)
27	MF	ENG	Ishmel Demontagnac
28	GK	GHA	Richard Kingson
29	MF	AUS	David Carney
30	MF	SCO	Stephen Husband
32	FW	ENG	Tom Barkhuizen
33	DF	ENG	Josh Roberts
34	MF	ENG	Liam Tomsett
39	FW	ENG	DJ Campbell
41	FW	BLR	Sergei Kornilenko (on loan from Zenit Saint Petersburg)
42	MF	ENG	Jason Puncheon (on loan from Southampton)
43	MF	IRL	Andy Reid
44	FW	ENG	James Beattie (on loan from Rangers)

=== Left club during season ===
Note: Flags indicate national team as defined under FIFA eligibility rules; some limited exceptions apply. Players may hold more than one non-FIFA nationality.

No.	Pos.	Nation	Player
31	DF	ISR	Dekel Keinan (to Cardiff City)

=== Reserve squad ===
Note: Flags indicate national team as defined under FIFA eligibility rules; some limited exceptions apply. Players may hold more than one non-FIFA nationality.

No.	Pos.	Nation	Player
7	FW	IRL	Billy Clarke
8	MF	FRA	Malaury Martin
22	DF	ENG	Ashley Eastham
25	FW	ENG	Louis Almond
31	DF	MAR	Salaheddine Sbaï (on loan from Nîmes)

No.	Pos.	Nation	Player
35	DF	ENG	Biko Youanda
36	MF	ENG	Kingsley Francis-Reynolds
37	MF	ENG	Adam Dodd
40	FW	ENG	Pa Modu Jobe
45	GK	SCO	Chris Kettings

== Match results ==
=== Premier League ===
==== Final table ====
Pos	Team	Pld	W	D	L	GF	GA	GD	Pts	Qualification or relegation
16	Wigan Athletic	38	9	15	14	40	61	−21	42	
17	Wolverhampton Wanderers	38	11	7	20	46	66	−20	40	
18	Birmingham City (R)	38	8	15	15	37	58	−21	39	Qualification for the Europa League play-off round and relegation to Football League Championship (Note: Birmingham City qualified for the play-off round of the Europa League after winning the League Cup, worth a third qualification round spot, and subsequently being moved up a round due to the outcome of the FA Cup final.)
19	Blackpool (R)	38	10	9	19	55	78	−23	39	Relegation to Football League Championship
20	West Ham United (R)	38	7	12	19	43	70	−27	33	Relegation to Football League Championship

Source: Barclays Premier League
Rules for classification: 1) points; 2) goal difference; 3) number of goals scored.
(R) Relegated

==== Results per matchday ====
Matchday	1	2	3	4	5	6	7	8	9	10	11	12	13	14	15	16	17	18	19	20	21	22	23	24	25	26	27	28	29	30	31	32	33	34	35	36	37	38
Ground	A	A	H	A	A	H	A	H	A	H	H	A	A	H	A	A	A	A	H	H	A	H	H	H	A	H	H	A	H	A	A	H	H	H	H	A	H	A
Result	W	L	D	W	L	L	W	L	L	W	D	L	D	W	D	W	W	L	L	W	L	L	L	L	L	D	W	L	L	D	L	L	L	D	D	D	W	L
Position	2	10	10	4	9	13	9	10	14	9	11	14	15	11	10	10	8	10	11	9	10	11	12	13	15	16	12	14	15	15	17	17	18	17	17	17	18	19

Updated to match(es) played on 22 May 2011. Source: Statto.com
A = Away; H = Home; W = Win; D = Draw; L = Loss

14 August 2010 1	Wigan Athletic	0–4	Blackpool	Wigan
15:00 BST		(Report)	Taylor-Fletcher 16'; Harewood 38', 43'; Baptiste 75'	Stadium: DW Stadium; Attendance: 16,152; Referee: Mark Halsey

21 August 2010 2	Arsenal	6–0	Blackpool	London
15:00 BST	Walcott 12', 39', 58'; Arshavin 32' (pen.); Diaby 49'; Chamakh 84'	(Report)	Evatt (red card) 31'	Stadium: Emirates Stadium; Attendance: 60,032; Referee: Mike Jones

28 August 2010 3	Blackpool	2–2	Fulham	Blackpool
15:00 BST	Pantsil 71' (o.g.); Varney 76'	(Report)	Zamora 35'; Etuhu 87'	Stadium: Bloomfield Road; Attendance: 15,529; Referee: Michael Oliver

11 September 2010 4	Newcastle United	0–2	Blackpool	Newcastle upon Tyne
15:00 BST		(Report)	Adam 45' (pen.); Campbell 90'	Stadium: St James' Park; Attendance: 49,597; Referee: Lee Mason

19 September 2010 5	Chelsea	4–0	Blackpool	London
16:00 BST	Kalou 2'; Malouda 12', 41'; Drogba 30'	(Report)		Stadium: Stamford Bridge; Attendance: 41,761; Referee: Mark Clattenburg

25 September 2010 6	Blackpool	1–2	Blackburn Rovers	Blackpool
15:00 BST	Phillips 85'	(Report)	Adam 21' (o.g.); Emerton 90+3'	Stadium: Bloomfield Road; Attendance: 15,901; Referee: Mike Dean

3 October 2010 7	Liverpool	1–2	Blackpool	Liverpool
15:00 BST	Kyrgiakos 53'	(Report)	Adam 29' (pen.); Varney 45+2'	Stadium: Anfield; Attendance: 43,156; Referee: Jones

17 October 2010 8	Blackpool	2–3	Manchester City	Blackpool
16:00 BST	Harewood 78'; Taylor-Fletcher 90+3'	(Report)	Tevez 67', 79'; Silva 90'	Stadium: Bloomfield Road; Attendance: 16,116; Referee: Dowd

23 October 2010 9	Birmingham City	2–0	Blackpool	Birmingham
15:00 BST	Ridgewell 36'; Žigić 56'	(Report)		Stadium: St Andrew's; Attendance: 26,850; Referee: Taylor

1 November 2010 10	Blackpool	2–1	West Bromwich Albion	Blackpool
20:00 GMT	Adam 12' (pen.); Varney 63'	(Report)	Mulumbu 84'; Ibáñez (red card) 11'; Jara (red card) 29'	Stadium: Bloomfield Road; Attendance: 15,210; Referee: Oliver

6 November 2010 11	Blackpool	2–2	Everton	Blackpool
15:00 GMT	Eardley 10'; Vaughan 48'	(Report)	Cahill 13'; Coleman 50'	Stadium: Bloomfield Road; Attendance: 16,094; Referee: Marriner

10 November 2010 12	Aston Villa	3–2	Blackpool	Birmingham
19:45 GMT	Downing 28'; Delfouneso 60'; Collins 89'	(Report)	Harewood 45'; Campbell 87'	Stadium: Villa Park; Attendance: 34,330; Referee: Taylor

13 November 2010 13	West Ham United	0–0	Blackpool	London
15:00 GMT		(Report)		Stadium: Upton Park; Attendance: 31,194; Referee: Friend

20 November 2010 14	Blackpool	2–1	Wolverhampton Wanderers	Blackpool
15:00 GMT	Varney 33'; Harewood 44'	(Report)	Doyle 86'	Stadium: Bloomfield Road; Attendance: 15,922; Referee: Mark Clattenburg

27 November 2010 15	Bolton Wanderers	2–2	Blackpool	Bolton
15:00 GMT	Petrov 76'; M. Davies 89'	(Report)	Evatt 28'; Varney 57'	Stadium: Reebok Stadium; Attendance: 25,851; Referee: Dean

11 December 2010 16	Stoke City	0–1	Blackpool	Stoke-on-Trent
15:00 GMT		(Report)	Campbell 48'	Stadium: Britannia Stadium; Attendance: 26,879; Referee: Taylor

28 December 2010 17	Sunderland	0–2	Blackpool	Sunderland
15:00 GMT		(Report)	Campbell 50', 90'	Stadium: Stadium of Light; Attendance: 42,892; Referee: Marriner

1 January 2011 18	Manchester City	1–0	Blackpool	Manchester
15:00 GMT	Johnson 34'	(Report)		Stadium: City of Manchester Stadium; Attendance: 47,296; Referee: Clattenburg

4 January 2011 19	Blackpool	1–2	Birmingham City	Blackpool
20:00 GMT	Campbell 68'	(Report)	Hleb 24'; Dann 89'	Stadium: Bloomfield Road; Attendance: 14,550; Referee: Moss

12 January 2011 20	Blackpool	2–1	Liverpool	Blackpool
20:00 GMT	Taylor-Fletcher 12'; Campbell 69'	(Report)	Torres 3'	Stadium: Bloomfield Road; Attendance: 16,089; Referee: Oliver
Note: Originally scheduled for 26 December, the fixture was postponed due to the pitch at Bloomfield Road being frozen over.

15 January 2011 21	West Bromwich Albion	3–2	Blackpool	West Bromwich
15:00 GMT	Odemwingie 37', 87'; Morrison 52'	(Report)	Vaughan 11'; Taylor-Fletcher 80'	Stadium: The Hawthorns; Attendance: 25,316; Referee: Attwell

22 January 2011 22	Blackpool	1–2	Sunderland	Blackpool
15:00 GMT	Adam 86' (pen.)	(Report)	Richardson 15', 36'	Stadium: Bloomfield Road; Attendance: 16,037; Referee: Mason

25 January 2011 23	Blackpool	2–3	Manchester United	Blackpool
19:30 GMT	Cathcart 15'; Campbell 43'	(Report)	Berbatov 72', 88'; Hernández 74'	Stadium: Bloomfield Road; Attendance: 15,574; Referee: Walton
Note: Originally scheduled for 4 December, the fixture was postponed due to heavy snowfall across the UK.

2 February 2011 24	Blackpool	1–3	West Ham United	Blackpool
20:00 GMT	Adam 42'	(Report)	Obinna 24', 44'; Keane 37'	Stadium: Bloomfield Road; Attendance: 15,095; Referee: Attwell

5 February 2011 25	Everton	5–3	Blackpool	Liverpool
15:00 GMT	Saha 20', 47', 76', 84'; Beckford 80'	(Report)	Baptiste 37'; Puncheon 62'; Adam 64'	Stadium: Goodison Park; Attendance: 38,202; Referee: Kevin Friend

12 February 2011 26	Blackpool	1–1	Aston Villa	Blackpool
15:00 GMT	Grandin 14'	(Report)	Agbonlahor 10'; Makoun (red card) 70'	Stadium: Bloomfield Road; Attendance: 16,000; Referee: Webb

22 February 2011 27	Blackpool	3–1	Tottenham Hotspur	Blackpool
20:00 GMT	Adam 18' (pen.); Campbell 44'; Ormerod 80'	(Report)	Pavlyuchenko 90+3'	Stadium: Bloomfield Road; Attendance: 16,069; Referee: Foy
Note: Originally scheduled for 19 December, the fixture was postponed due to adverse weather conditions.

26 February 2011 28	Wolverhampton Wanderers	4–0	Blackpool	Wolverhampton
15:00 GMT	Jarvis 2'; O'Hara 54'; Ebanks-Blake 78', 90'	(Report)	Campbell (red card) 43'	Stadium: Molineux Stadium; Attendance: 29,086; Referee: Swarbrick

7 March 2011 29	Blackpool	1–3	Chelsea	Blackpool
20:00 GMT	Puncheon 86'	(Report)	Terry 20'; Lampard 62' (pen.), 66'	Stadium: Bloomfield Road; Attendance: 15,584; Referee: Dean

19 March 2011 30	Blackburn Rovers	2–2	Blackpool	Blackburn
15:00 GMT	Samba 49'; Hoilett 90+3'	(Report)	Adam 25' (pen.), 29'	Stadium: Ewood Park; Attendance: 27,209; Referee: Webb

3 April 2011 31	Fulham	3–0	Blackpool	Fulham
13:30 GMT	Zamora 23', 28'; Etuhu 72'	(Report)		Stadium: Craven Cottage; Attendance: 25,692; Referee: Attwell

10 April 2011 32	Blackpool	1–3	Arsenal	Blackpool
13:30 GMT	Taylor-Fletcher 52'	(Report)	Diaby 18'; Eboue 21' van Persie 76'	Stadium: Bloomfield Road; Attendance: 16,030; Referee: Mason

16 April 2011 33	Blackpool	1–3	Wigan Athletic	Blackpool
15:00 GMT	Campbell 83'	(Report)	Rodallega 3'; N'Zogbia 45'; Eardley 67' (o.g.)	Stadium: Bloomfield Road; Attendance: 16,030; Referee: Walton

23 April 2011 34	Blackpool	1–1	Newcastle United	Blackpool
15:00 GMT	Campbell 32'	(Report)	Løvenkrands 17'	Stadium: Bloomfield Road; Attendance: 16,003; Referee: Atkinson

30 April 2011 35	Blackpool	0–0	Stoke City	Blackpool
15:00 GMT		(Report)		Stadium: Bloomfield Road; Attendance: 16,003; Referee: Clattenburg

7 May 2011 36	Tottenham Hotspur	1–1	Blackpool	London
17:30 GMT	Defoe 89'	(Report)	Adam 76' (pen.)	Stadium: White Hart Lane; Attendance: 35,585; Referee: Probert

14 May 2011 37	Blackpool	4–3	Bolton Wanderers	Blackpool
12:45 GMT	Campbell 9', 45'; Puncheon 19'; Adam 63'	(Report)	Davies 6'; Taylor 24'; Sturridge 53'	Stadium: Bloomfield Road; Attendance: 15,979; Referee: Marriner

22 May 2011 38	Manchester United	4–2	Blackpool	Manchester
16:00 GMT	Park 21'; Anderson 62'; Evatt 74' (o.g.); Owen 81'	(Report)	Adam 40'; Taylor-Fletcher 57'	Stadium: Old Trafford; Attendance: 75,400; Referee: Dean

=== League Cup ===
24 August 2010 Second round	MK Dons	4–3 (a.e.t.)	Blackpool	Milton Keynes
19:30 BST	S. Baldock 1'; Easter 55', 57'; Guy 110'	(Report)	Ormerod 52'; Sylvestre 58'; Adam 82' (pen.)	Stadium: Stadium MK; Attendance: 7,458; Referee: Bates

=== FA Cup ===
8 January 2011 Third round	Southampton	2–0	Blackpool	Southampton
15:00 GMT	Barnard 53'; Guly 88'	(Report)		Stadium: St Mary's Stadium; Attendance: 21,464; Referee: Danny McDermid

== Player statistics ==
=== Appearances and goals ===
No.	Pos	Nat	Player	Total		Premier League		FA Cup		League Cup	
No.	Pos	Nat	Player	Apps	Goals	Apps	Goals	Apps	Goals	Apps	Goals
Goalkeepers
1	GK	(England) ENG	Paul Rachubka	3	0	1+1	0	1	0	0	0
13	GK	(England) ENG	Mark Halstead	2	0	0+1	0	0	0	1	0
21	GK	(Scotland) SCO	Matthew Gilks	18	0	18	0	0	0	0	0
28	GK	(Ghana) GHA	Richard Kingson	20	0	19+1	0	0	0	0	0
Defenders
2	DF	(England) ENG	Danny Coid	1	0	0	0	0	0	1	0
3	DF	(Scotland) SCO	Stephen Crainey	31	0	31	0	0	0	0	0
5	DF	(Wales) WAL	Neal Eardley	34	1	31+1	1	1	0	1	0
6	DF	(England) ENG	Ian Evatt	38	1	36+2	1	0	0	0	0
15	DF	(England) ENG	Alex Baptiste	22	2	19+2	2	1	0	0	0
17	DF	(England) ENG	Chris Basham	3	0	1+1	0	0	0	1	0
20	DF	(Northern Ireland) NIR	Craig Cathcart	30	1	28+2	1	0	0	0	0
24	DF	(Wales) WAL	Rob Edwards	4	0	1+1	0	1	0	1	0
29	DF	(Australia) AUS	David Carney	11	0	5+6	0	0	0	0	0
Midfielders
4	MF	(England) ENG	Keith Southern	22	0	11+10	0	1	0	0	0
11	MF	(Wales) WAL	David Vaughan	35	2	35	2	0	0	0	0
14	MF	(France) FRA	Elliot Grandin	24	1	21+2	1	0	0	0+1	0
18	MF	(Jamaica) JAM	Jason Euell	4	0	1+2	0	1	0	0	0
19	MF	(France) FRA	Ludovic Sylvestre	10	1	6+2	0	1	0	1	1
23	MF	(England) ENG	Matt Phillips	28	1	6+21	1	1	0	0	0
26	MF	(Scotland) SCO	Charlie Adam	36	13	34+1	12	0	0	0+1	1
27	MF	(England) ENG	Ishmel Demontagnac	2	0	0+1	0	0	0	1	0
30	MF	(Scotland) SCO	Stephen Husband	1	0	0	0	0	0	1	0
33	MF	(Wales) WAL	Josh Roberts	1	0	0	0	0+1	0	0	0
34	MF	(England) ENG	Liam Tomsett	1	0	0	0	1	0	0	0
36	MF	(Jamaica) JAM	Kingsley Francis-Reynolds	1	0	0	0	0+1	0	0	0
36	MF	(Republic of Ireland) IRL	Andy Reid	5	0	2+3	0	0	0	0	0
42	MF	(England) ENG	Jason Puncheon	11	3	6+5	3	0	0	0	0
Forwards
9	FW	(England) ENG	Marlon Harewood	16	5	7+9	5	0	0	0	0
10	FW	(England) ENG	Brett Ormerod	21	2	6+13	1	1	0	1	1
12	FW	(England) ENG	Gary Taylor-Fletcher	32	6	29+2	6	0	0	0+1	0
16	FW	(England) ENG	Luke Varney	30	5	24+6	5	0	0	0	0
32	FW	(England) ENG	Tom Barkhuizen	2	0	0	0	0+1	0	1	0
39	FW	(England) ENG	DJ Campbell	31	13	30+1	13	0	0	0	0
41	FW	(Belarus) BLR	Sergei Kornilenko	6	0	3+3	0	0	0	0	0
44	FW	(England) ENG	James Beattie	9	0	5+4	0	0	0	0	0
Players transferred out during the season
31	DF	(Israel) ISR	Dekel Keinan	8	0	3+3	0	1	0	1	0

Last updated: 15 May 2011
Source: Competitions
