= 2003 UEFA–CAF Meridian Cup =

The 2003 UEFA–CAF Meridian Cup was the fourth UEFA–CAF Meridian Cup and was held in Egypt.

== Teams ==
- Egypt (host nation)
- Burkina Faso
- England
- France
- Mali
- Nigeria
- Spain
- Switzerland

== Standings ==
Pos	Team	Pld	W	D	L	GF	GA	Pts
1	Spain	4	4	0	0	16	1	12
2	Switzerland	4	2	2	0	4	1	8
3	France	4	2	2	0	6	4	8
4	England	4	2	2	0	5	3	8
5	Burkina Faso	4	0	2	2	3	6	2
6	Nigeria	4	0	2	2	2	8	2
7	Mali	4	0	1	3	3	10	1
8	Egypt	4	0	1	3	1	7	1

== Results ==
25 January 2003

Egypt	0–2	Switzerland

25 January 2003

Nigeria	2–3	France

25 January 2003

England	3–2	Burkina Faso

25 January 2003

Spain	6–1	Mali

27 January 2003

Switzerland	0–0	Nigeria

27 January 2003

France	1–1	Egypt

27 January 2003

Burkina Faso	0–2	Spain

27 January 2003

Mali	1–1	England

29 January 2003

Nigeria	0–5	Spain

29 January 2003

Egypt	0–1	England

29 January 2003

Switzerland	1–1	Burkina Faso

29 January 2003

France	2–1	Mali

1 February 2003

Burkina Faso	0–0	France

1 February 2003

Mali	0–1	Switzerland

1 February 2003

England	0–0	Nigeria

1 February 2003

Spain	3–0	Egypt
