= Christian Fabrice Okoua =

Ivorian footballer

Christian Okoua
Personal information
- Full name: Christian Fabrice Okoua
- Date of birth: 18 November 1991 (age 34)
- Place of birth: Abidjan, Ivory Coast
- Height: 1.98 m (6 ft 6 in)
- Position: Goalkeeper

Team information
- Current team: Sanjoanense
- Number: 12

Youth career
- Africa Sports

Senior career*
Years	Team	Apps	(Gls)
2008–2016	Africa Sports		
2016–2017	Vila Real	4	(0)
2017–2018	Mirandela	0	(0)
2019–2021	Tirsense	31	(0)
2021–2023	Fontinhas	41	(0)
2023–	Sanjoanense	2	(0)

International career
2008	Ivory Coast U23		
- * Club domestic league appearances and goals as of 27 August 2023

Christian Fabrice Okoua (born 18 November 1991) is an Ivorian professional footballer who plays as a goalkeeper for Portuguese Liga 3 club Sanjoanense.

== International career ==
Okoua represented his country at the 2008 Olympic Games. He was the youngest player at the games. Okoua played by Toulon Tournament 2008 for Ivory Coast Under-23 and was member of the African Nations Championship 2009 in Ivory Coast, he was member of the 2007 Meridian Cup.
