= Yosief Zeratsion =

Eritrean footballer

Personal information
- Full name: Yosief Zeratsion
- Date of birth: 17 May 1990 (age 36)
- Position: Goalkeeper

International career
Years	Team	Apps	(Gls)
2009	Eritrea	3	(0)

Yosief Zeratsion (born 17 May 1990) is an Eritrean football goalkeeper. He has played for the Eritrea national football team.

== International career ==
Zeratsion played in the 2009 CECAFA Cup in Kenya. He appeared in each group match, including the opening goalless draw with Zimbabwe, the 2–1 group match defeat to Rwanda, and the 3–1 group match win against Somalia.
