= Salaheddine Sbaï =

Moroccan footballer (born 1985)

Personal information
- Date of birth: 21 August 1985 (age 41)
- Place of birth: Sidi Kacem, Morocco
- Height: 1.78 m (5 ft 10 in)
- Position: Left back

Youth career
- 1993–1995: Lourdes
- 1995–2001: Nîmes
- 2001–2002: Stade Lavallois

Senior career*
Years	Team	Apps	(Gls)
2002–2009	Charleroi	41	(0)
2005	→ Ronse (loan)	5	(0)
2005–2007	→ Tubize (loan)	48	(1)
2009–2013	Nîmes	26	(0)
2011	→ Blackpool (loan)	0	(0)
2013	Raja Casablanca		
2014–2018	Lyon Duchère		

International career^{‡}
2004–2005	Morocco U20	3	(0)
2005–2006	Morocco U23	4	(0)
2008–2013	Morocco	2	(0)
- * Club domestic league appearances and goals as of 02:20, 18 July 2013 (UTC) ‡ National team caps and goals as of 22:49, 23 June 2010 (UTC)

Salaheddine Sbaï (born 21 August 1985 in Sidi Kacem) is a Moroccan former professional footballer.

== Club career ==
Sbaï began his career for the youth side at Charleroi and was loaned out for the 2004/2005 season to Ronse. After only five games in the 2004/2005 season for Ronse, he turned back to Charleroi, the club loaned him again to another club and signed a two-year loan deal with Tubize. After forty-eight games, where he scored one goal for Tubize, he returned to Charleroi in August 2008.

On 24 June 2009 Nîmes Olympique signed the defender from Charleroi alongside forward Yohan Bocognano from AC Ajaccio and forward Abdelmounaïm El Hajaoui from FC Sete.

On 27 January 2011, Sbaï signed for English club Blackpool on loan until the end of the season, with a view to a further twelve-month loan, as cover for Stephen Crainey and David Carney. He attended the match against Manchester United and trained with the first team on 27 January. However, he did not make a single appearance for the Tangerines and was released at the end of the season, following Blackpool's relegation from the Premier League.

== International career ==
Sbaï is a former U-21 international for Morocco. He received his first cap for Morocco national football team in the 2010 FIFA World Cup qualification match against Mauritania on 11 October 2008.

== Personal life ==
Sbaï's brothers, Amine and Hatim Sbaï are also professional footballers.
