= Miguel Molina (footballer) =

Spanish football coach (born 1993)

Personal information
- Full name: Miguel Molina Hidalgo
- Date of birth: 3 January 1993 (age 33)
- Place of birth: Getafe, Spain

Team information
- Current team: Arsenal (assistant)

Youth career
- Years: Team
- Atlético Madrid

Miguel Molina Hidalgo (born 3 January 1993) is a Spanish football coach who is currently an assistant coach of Premier League club Arsenal.

== Career ==
Molina played football as a youth for Atlético Madrid. After obtaining a degree in Sport and Exercise Science at the Polytechnic University of Madrid, he returned to Atlético and served as an assistant coach from 2017 to 2020.

=== Arsenal ===
In August 2020, Molina moved to England as an assistant coach of Mikel Arteta at Arsenal. He often watches the action from a higher vantage point during games, using a wireless headset to communicate with the coaching staff (usually Albert Stuivenberg) on the touchline.

Molina was part of Arteta's coaching team that guided the Gunners to win the 2020 FA Community Shield on penalties against Liverpool on 29 August 2020 and win the 2023 FA Community Shield on penalties against Manchester City on 6 August 2023.

Molina currently works alongside assistant coaches Albert Stuivenberg and Gabriel Heinze, set-piece coach Nicolas Jover and goalkeeping coach Iñaki Caña. He has previously worked with assistant coach Steve Round and set-piece coach Andreas Georgson at Arsenal.
