= 1999 UEFA–CAF Meridian Cup =

The 1999 UEFA–CAF Meridian Cup was the second UEFA–CAF Meridian Cup and was held in South Africa.

== Teams ==
- South Africa (host nation)
- Egypt
- Ghana
- Italy
- Nigeria
- Portugal
- Republic of Ireland
- Spain

== Group stage ==
In the following tables:

Key: Pld Matches played, W Won, D Drawn, L Lost, GF Goals for, GA Goals against, GD Goal Difference, Pts Points

Team qualified for the knockout stage. If place within group is known (1st or 2nd), it is indicated

=== Group A ===
Team	Pld	W	D	L	GF	GA	Pts
Spain	3	2	1	0	9	1	7
Egypt	3	1	2	0	4	2	5
Republic of Ireland	3	1	1	1	4	5	4
South Africa	3	0	0	3	2	11	0

28 January 1999

South Africa	1–2	Republic of Ireland

28 January 1999

Egypt	0–0	Spain

30 January 1999

South Africa	1–3	Egypt

30 January 1999

Republic of Ireland	1–3	Spain

1 February 1999

Spain	6–0	South Africa

1 February 1999

Republic of Ireland	1–1	Egypt

=== Group B ===
Team	Pld	W	D	L	GF	GA	Pts
Ghana	3	3	0	0	8	2	9
Portugal	3	0	2	1	4	7	2
Italy	3	0	2	1	4	5	2
Nigeria	3	0	2	1	4	6	2

28 January 1999

Nigeria	1–1	Italy

28 January 1999

Ghana	3–0	Portugal

30 January 1999

Nigeria	1–3	Ghana

30 January 1999

Italy	2–2	Portugal

1 February 1999

Portugal	2–2	Nigeria

1 February 1999

Italy	1–2	Ghana

== Knockout stage ==
Semi-finals
4 February 1999
Spain	3
Portugal	1
4 February 1999
Ghana	4
Egypt	2

Final
7 February 1999
Spain	2
Ghana	1
Third place
7 February 1999
Portugal (pen.)	0 (3)
Egypt	0 (1)
