= UEFA–CAF Meridian Cup =

UEFA-CAF Meridian Cup
- Organiser(s): UEFA & CAF
- Founded: 1997
- Abolished: 2007
- Region: Europe; Africa
- Last champions: European Selection U-18
- Most championships: Spain (3 titles)

The UEFA–CAF Meridian Cup was a football tournament that featured national teams from Europe and Africa among players under 18, and was part of the co-operation programme between UEFA and the CAF.

== Meridian Project ==
The UEFA–CAF Meridian Cup was part of the Meridian Project, a co-operation agreement concluded by the African and European football confederations in Lisbon on 30 January 1997 to promote the exchange of cultures and to offer young footballers a unique learning experience within the framework of a footballing festival. It was held every two years.

== Change of format ==
The competition evolved from its inception in 1997, running as an eight-team tournament until the 2005 event in Turkey after which the format was changed to a two-legged contest between two continental all-star U18 teams. The last UEFA–CAF Meridian Cup also involved an educational component consisting of joint training sessions and meetings of coaches from Europe and Africa. The 2007 event took place in Barcelona, Spain, and was hosted on the premises of FC Barcelona.

== Regulations ==
The regulations for the UEFA–CAF Meridian Cup were initially drawn up by the UEFA Administration before being submitted to the UEFA Youth & Amateur Football Committee. They were then forwarded upon that committee's approval to the UEFA Executive Committee for ratification.

== Tournaments ==
=== Meridian Project ===
Year	Host	Final			Third place match		
Year	Host	Winner	Score	Runner-up	Third place	Score	Fourth place
1997; Details	Portugal	Nigeria	3–2	Spain	Portugal	2–1 (a.e.t.)	Greece
1999; Details	South Africa	Spain	2–1	Ghana	Portugal	0–0; 3–1 (p)	Egypt
2001; Details	Italy	Spain	Round robin format	Italy	Portugal	Round robin format	Czech Republic
2003; Details	Egypt	Spain	Round robin format	Switzerland	France	Round robin format	England
2005; Details	Turkey	France	Round robin format	Spain	Turkey	Round robin format	Portugal

=== New format ===
Year	Host	Final		
Year	Host	Winner	Score	Runner-up
2007; Details	Spain	European Selection U-18	6–1, 4–0	African Selection U-18

=== Teams reaching the top four ===
Team	Winners	Runners-up	Third place	Fourth place
Spain	3 (1999, 2001, 2003)	2 (1997, 2005)		-
France	1 (2005)	-	1 (2003)	-
Nigeria	1 (1997)	-	-	-
UEFA	1 (2007)	-	-	-
Ghana	-	1 (1999)	-	-
Italy	-	1 (2001)	-	-
Switzerland	-	1 (2003)	-	-
CAF	-	1 (2007)	-	-
Portugal	-	-	3 (1997, 1999, 2001)	1 (2005)
Turkey	-	-	1 (2005)	-
Greece	-	-	-	1 (1997)
Egypt	-	-	-	1 (1999)
Czech Republic	-	-	-	1 (2001)
England	-	-	-	1 (2003)
