= 2005 UEFA–CAF Meridian Cup =

The 2005 UEFA–CAF Meridian Cup was the fifth UEFA–CAF Meridian Cup. It was held on 4–11 February in Turkey. The top four under-18 teams from Europe and Africa played in Kuşadası, Söke, Aydın and Ödemiş in the Aegean Region.

== Teams ==
- Turkey (host nation)
- Cameroon
- Egypt
- France
- Nigeria
- Portugal
- Sierra Leone
- Spain

== Standings ==
| Pos | Team | Pld | W | D | L | GF | GA | Pts |
|---|---|---|---|---|---|---|---|---|
| 1 | France | 4 | 4 | 0 | 0 | 15 | 2 | 12 |
| 2 | Spain | 4 | 4 | 0 | 0 | 9 | 0 | 12 |
| 3 | Turkey | 4 | 4 | 0 | 0 | 11 | 3 | 12 |
| 4 | Portugal | 4 | 2 | 2 | 0 | 4 | 1 | 8 |
| 5 | Egypt | 4 | 0 | 1 | 3 | 3 | 8 | 1 |
| 6 | Sierra Leone | 4 | 0 | 1 | 3 | 1 | 6 | 1 |
| 7 | Nigeria | 4 | 0 | 0 | 4 | 0 | 8 | 0 |
| 8 | Cameroon | 4 | 0 | 0 | 4 | 2 | 17 | 0 |

== Results ==
4 February 2005

| Cameroon | 0–7 | France |

4 February 2005

| Sierra Leone | 0–3 | Spain |

4 February 2005

| Portugal | 1–0 | Nigeria |

4 February 2005
13:30

| Turkey | 3–2 | Egypt |

Mukan Perinçek Stadium

6 February 2005

| Spain | 4–0 | Cameroon |

6 February 2005

| France | 2–1 | Sierra Leone |

6 February 2005
13:30

| Nigeria | 0–4 | Turkey |

Söke City Stadium

6 February 2005

| Egypt | 0–0 | Portugal |

8 February 2005

| Cameroon | 1–3 | Portugal |

8 February 2005

| Sierra Leone | 0–1 | Turkey |

Ödemis Stadium

8 February 2005

| France | 2–0 | Nigeria |

8 February 2005

| Spain | 1–0 | Egypt |

11 February 2005

| Turkey | 3–1 | Cameroon |

Özer Türk Stadium

11 February 2005

| Portugal | 0–0 | Sierra Leone |

11 February 2005

| Nigeria | 0–1 | Spain |

11 February 2005

| Egypt | 1–4 | France |
