= 2007–08 Barnsley F.C. season =

Barnsley
2007–08 season
- Chairman: Gordon Shepherd
- Manager: Simon Davey
- Stadium: Oakwell
- Championship: 18th
- FA Cup: Semi-final (eliminated by Cardiff City)
- League Cup: Second round (eliminated by Newcastle United)
- Top goalscorer: League: Brian Howard (13); All: Brian Howard (14)

During the 2007–08 season, Barnsley F.C. competed in the Championship, where they finished 18th, and also competed in the FA Cup and League Cup, where they were eliminated in the semi-final and second round respectively.

== First-team squad ==
Squad at end of season

Note: Flags indicate national team as defined under FIFA eligibility rules; some limited exceptions apply. Players may hold more than one non-FIFA nationality.

No.	Pos.	Nation	Player
2	DF	ENG	Bobby Hassell
3	DF	WAL	Lewin Nyatanga (Note: Nyatanga was born in Burton upon Trent, England, but qualified to represent Wales and Zimbabwe internationally, through his mother and father respectively, and made his international debut for Wales in March 2006.) (on loan from Derby County)
4	DF	ENG	Paul Reid
5	DF	ENG	Rob Kozluk
6	MF	WAL	Andy Johnson (Note: Johnson was born in Bristol, England, but qualified to represent Wales internationally and made his international debut for Wales in 1998.)
7	MF	ENG	Sam Togwell
9	FW	NGA	Kayode Odejayi
10	MF	ENG	Brian Howard
11	FW	ENG	Daniel Nardiello (on loan from Queens Park Rangers)
12	DF	ENG	Rob Atkinson
13	FW	HUN	István Ferenczi
14	FW	DEN	Kim Christensen
15	MF	BRA	Anderson de Silva
16	DF	ENG	Stephen Foster
17	FW	ENG	Jamil Adam

No.	Pos.	Nation	Player
18	MF	BRA	Dennis Souza
19	MF	ENG	Jacob Butterfield
20	MF	JAM	Jamal Campbell-Ryce (Note: Campbell-Ryce was born in Lambeth, England.)
21	FW	IRL	Jon Macken (Note: Macken was born in Manchester, England.)
22	GK	GER	Heinz Müller
23	DF	NED	Marciano Bruma
24	FW	ENG	Michael Coulson
25	MF	ENG	Martin Devaney
26	MF	ENG	Simon Heslop
29	MF	ARG	Diego León
30	GK	WAL	Kyle Letheren
31	GK	ENG	Luke Steele
37	MF	ENG	Dwayne Mattis
38	DF	ENG	Luke Potter

=== Left club during season ===
Note: Flags indicate national team as defined under FIFA eligibility rules; some limited exceptions apply. Players may hold more than one non-FIFA nationality.

No.	Pos.	Nation	Player
1	GK	IRL	Nick Colgan (to Ipswich Town)
1	GK	TRI	Tony Warner (Note: Warner was born in Liverpool, England.) (on loan from Fulham)
8	FW	PER	Miguel Mostto (on loan to Coronel Bolognesi)
11	MF	NIR	Grant McCann (to Scunthorpe United)
17	MF	ENG	Rohan Ricketts (to Toronto FC)
20	DF	ENG	Robbie Williams (to Huddersfield Town)

No.	Pos.	Nation	Player
28	FW	ENG	Nathan Joynes (to Halifax Town)
33	DF	ENG	Thomas Harban (to Halifax Town)
34	FW	SCO	Scott McGrory (on loan to Harrogate Town)
35	DF	ENG	Rhys Meynell (on loan to Gretna)
40	DF	POR	Tininho (on loan from West Bromwich Albion)
55	MF	GER	Dominik Werling (on loan from Sakaryaspor)

== Competitions ==
=== Championship ===
==== League table ====
Pos	Team	Pld	W	D	L	GF	GA	GD	Pts
16	Sheffield Wednesday	46	14	13	19	54	55	−1	55
17	Norwich City	46	15	10	21	49	59	−10	55
18	Barnsley	46	14	13	19	52	65	−13	55
19	Blackpool	46	12	18	16	59	64	−5	54
20	Southampton	46	13	15	18	56	72	−16	54

Updated to match(es) played on 4 May 2008. Source: The Football League
Rules for classification: 1) points; 2) goal difference; 3) number of goals scored.

==== Match details ====
Championship match details
Date	Opponents	Venue	Result	Score F–A	Scorers	Attendance	Ref
11 August 2007	Coventry City	H	L	1–4	Howard 9' pen.	12,616	
18 August 2007	Colchester United	A	D	2–2	Howard 28' pen., 85' pen.	4,450	
25 August 2007	Plymouth Argyle	H	W	3–2	Ferenczi 12', Werling 45', Howard 60'	9,240	
1 September 2007	West Bromwich Albion	A	L	0–2		18,310	
15 September 2007	Scunthorpe United	H	W	2–0	Williams 45' o.g., Odejayi 65'	11,230	
18 September 2007	Stoke City	A	D	0–0		13,071	
22 September 2007	Southampton	A	W	3–2	McCann 27', 40', Devaney 90'	19,151	
29 September 2007	Cardiff City	H	D	1–1	Howard 84'	10,709	
2 October 2007	Bristol City	H	W	3–0	Howard 67', Souza 72', Devaney 88'	9,679	
6 October 2007	Charlton Athletic	A	D	1–1	Christensen 90'	21,081	
20 October 2007	Burnley	H	D	1–1	Mostto 71'	11,560	
22 October 2007	Hull City	A	L	0–3		15,761	
27 October 2007	Leicester City	A	L	0–2		24,133	
3 November 2007	Preston North End	H	W	1–0	Ferenczi 42'	10,223	
5 November 2007	Blackpool	H	W	2–1	Howard 21' pen., Ferenczi 70'	8,531	
10 November 2007	Wolverhampton Wanderers	A	L	0–1		22,231	
24 November 2007	Watford	H	W	3–2	Howard 31', Devaney 34', Lee 66' o.g.	10,117	
27 November 2007	Sheffield Wednesday	A	L	0–1		27,769	
1 December 2007	Ipswich Town	A	D	0–0		19,540	
4 December 2007	Wolverhampton Wanderers	H	W	1–0	Ferenczi 47'	9,956	
8 December 2007	Crystal Palace	H	D	0–0		10,298	
15 December 2007	Sheffield United	A	L	0–1		26,629	
22 December 2007	Bristol City	A	L	2–3	Macken 33', Souza 40'	16,588	
26 December 2007	Stoke City	H	D	3–3	Howard 23' pen., Macken 66', 85'	12,398	
29 December 2007	Southampton	H	D	2–2	Togwell 1', Campbell-Ryce 34'	10,425	
1 January 2008	Scunthorpe United	A	D	2–2	McCann 74', Howard 90' pen.	6,897	
12 January 2008	Norwich City	H	L	1–3	Devaney 18'	10,117	
19 January 2008	Queens Park Rangers	A	L	0–2		16,197	
29 January 2008	Colchester United	H	W	1–0	Macken 45'	9,246	
2 February 2008	Coventry City	A	L	0–4		16,449	
9 February 2008	West Bromwich Albion	H	W	2–1	Nardiello 30', Macken 45'	13,083	
12 February 2008	Plymouth Argyle	A	L	0–3		11,346	
23 February 2008	Norwich City	A	L	0–1		24,197	
26 February 2008	Queens Park Rangers	H	D	0–0		9,019	
1 March 2008	Sheffield Wednesday	H	D	0–0		18,257	
4 March 2008	Blackpool	A	D	1–1	Campbell-Ryce 45'	8,080	
11 March 2008	Ipswich Town	H	W	4–1	Howard 27', 83' pen., Macken 50', Wright 86' o.g.	11,333	
15 March 2008	Crystal Palace	A	L	0–2		17,459	
22 March 2008	Sheffield United	H	L	0–1		15,798	
29 March 2008	Burnley	A	L	1–2	Howard 43'	11,915	
9 April 2008	Watford	A	W	3–0	Odejayi 36', 54', Foster 47'	16,129	
12 April 2008	Preston North End	A	W	2–1	León 33', Macken 55' pen.	13,994	
15 April 2008	Hull City	H	L	1–3	Ferenczi 90'	13,061	
19 April 2008	Leicester City	H	L	0–1		14,644	
26 April 2008	Charlton Athletic	H	W	3–0	Campbell-Ryce 11', Nyatanga 33', Macken 85'	11,228	
4 May 2008	Cardiff City	A	L	0–3		14,469	

=== FA Cup ===
FA Cup match details
Round	Date	Opponents	Venue	Result	Score F–A	Scorers	Attendance	Ref.
Third round	5 January 2008	Blackpool	H	W	2–1	Foster 78', Coulson 81'	8,276	
Fourth round	25 January 2008	Southend United	A	W	1–0	Campbell-Ryce 22'	7,212	
Fifth round	16 February 2008	Liverpool	A	W	2–1	Foster 57', Howard 90'	42,449	
Sixth round	8 March 2008	Chelsea	H	W	1–0	Odejayi 66'	22,410	
Semi-final	6 April 2008	Cardiff City	N	L	0–1		82,752	

=== League Cup ===
League Cup match details
Round	Date	Opponents	Venue	Result	Score F–A	Scorers	Attendance	Ref.
First round	14 August 2007	Darlington	H	W	2–1	Ferenczi 65', Reid 77'	3,780	
Second round	29 August 2007	Newcastle United	A	L	0–2		30,523	

== Preparation for 2007/08 ==
At the end of the season, Barnsley announced the release of first team members Antony Kay, Neil Austin, and Marc Richards. Strikers Daniel Nardiello and Paul Hayes then left to join QPR and Scunthorpe United, respectively. Paul Heckingbottom also agreed a loan move to his former club Bradford City, until the end of January. Manager Simon Davey was quite prolific in the summer transfer window, bringing in no less than fourteen new players and spending around £1 million, the majority of this on three strikers.

=== New players ===
Strikers: Kayode Odejayi (Cheltenham), Miguel Mostto (Cienciano), Kim Christensen (Odense Boldklub)

Midfield: Anderson Silva de Franca (On loan from Everton), Jamal Campbell-Ryce (Southend United), Dominik Werling (Sakaryaspor), Andy Johnson (Leicester City), Rohan Ricketts (Wolverhampton Wanderers)

Defenders: Rob Kozluk (Sheffield United), Dennis Souza (RAEC Mons), Lewin Nyatanga (on loan from Derby), Stephen Foster (Burnley), Marciano Bruma (Sparta Rotterdam)

Goalkeeper: Heinz Muller (Lillestrøm S.K.)

== Season overview ==
- Barnsley Line Up vs Chelsea on 08/03/08.

With the departure of six first team players (Daniel Nardiello, Paul Hayes, Antony Kay, Paul Heckingbottom, Neil Austin and Marc Richards), Simon Davey dipped heavily into the summer transfer market and ultimately brought in fourteen new players, the majority of whom were foreign. The most successful of these signings included goalkeeper Heinz Muller, midfielders Anderson and Jamal Campbell-Ryce, and a new defensive line-up made up of Rob Kozluk, Dennis Souza, Stephen Foster and Lewin Nyatanga (who returned on an extended loan spell after becoming a fan favourite).

Barnsley had a very positive start to the season, surpassing expectations and finding themselves in the top six of the Football League Championship with ten games played. Most of the summer signings found their way into the squad early on, making it quite common for there only to be two or three players in the starting eleven who were with the club in the previous season. Top scorer Brian Howard was rumored to have attracted Premiership interest along with new signings Heinz Muller, Dennis Souza and even manager Simon Davey. The team managed to maintain a decent level of consistency, remaining in the top half of the table throughout the first half of the season. Derby striker Jon Macken arrived on loan in November, and scored his first three goals for the club in his last two matches before being recalled by Derby at the end of December along with Lewin Nyatanga. Barnsley's form finally began to stutter through December and January, when they went for eight league games without a victory and dropped to 16th in the table. They did, however, beat both Blackpool and Southend in the FA Cup to secure passage to the last sixteen.

The first new signing of the January window was Spanish midfielder Diego León, followed by a short-term loan signing for Miguel Tininho and a controversial loan deal for ex-reds striker Daniel Nardiello (who had turned down a contract offer to leave the club for QPR the previous summer). Shortly before the transfer window closed, Davey signed previously loaned players Jon Macken from Derby County and Anderson from Everton (each for an undisclosed six-figure fee), as well as securing yet another loan spell for Lewin Nyatanga, with a fee agreed for a permanent summer switch. Outgoing from the club was reserve goalkeeper Nick Colgan to Championship rivals Ipswich, so an injury to first-choice keeper Heinz Muller forced a late loan deal for goalkeeper Tony Warner on a month's loan from Fulham. Anderson also suffered an injury in late February which would keep him out for up to seven months.

Barnsley continued to maintain their lower mid-table position in the Championship, unable to put a winning streak together. On 16 February, the team travelled to Anfield to play Liverpool in the 5th round of the FA Cup and pulled off a surprise 2–1 victory, with a strong defensive display and a 'Man of the Match', 'Player of the Round' performance from loaned keeper Luke Steele (who was brought in at the last minute for cup-tied Tony Warner). After conceding a goal in the first half, it was Stephen Foster who equalised in the second and captain Brian Howard who scored the last-gasp winner which allowed them to progress to the quarter finals for the first time since 1999, where they would face Chelsea at Oakwell. Here, the Tykes put in a 'sensational' performance against the FA Cup holders and 'Player of the Round' Kayode Odejayi's second-half header (only his second goal of the season) was enough to put the Yorkshire side into the semi-final for the first time since they won the cup in 1912. Even Chelsea boss Avram Grant admitted after the game that the Championship side fully deserved their win Davey hails giantkillers Barnsley. With Portsmouth the only Premiership side remaining in the competition, what had begun as a shock result at Anfield had now developed into a genuine chance to reclaim their FA Cup glory, and when they were drawn against Cardiff City in the semi-finals a repeat of the historic final versus West Bromwich Albion was well on the cards. However, in front of a Wembley crowd of 82,752 they narrowly lost the game 1–0 to Cardiff thanks to an 8th-minute strike from Joe Ledley.

Meanwhile, in the league, losses against Crystal Palace, Sheffield United and Burnley saw them drop to a precarious position and relegation fears were brewing, but a surprise 3–0 away win at Watford followed by a 1–2 victory at Preston North End were a big boost to their survival hopes. Their survival was secured on the second-to-last matchday with a 3–0 home victory over Charlton, and they eventually finished at 18th in the league with 55 points.

== Goalscorers ==
League Goals (Cup Goals)

- Brian Howard 13 (1)
- Jon Macken 8
- Istvan Ferenczi 5 (1)
- Martin Devaney 4
- Kayode Odejayi 3 (1)
- Grant McCann 3
- Jamal Campbell-Ryce 3 (1)
- Dennis Souza 2
- Stephen Foster 1 (2)
- Diego León 1
- Daniel Nardiello 1
- Lewin Nyatanga 1
- Sam Togwell 1
- Kim Christensen 1
- Dominik Werling 1
- Miguel Mostto 1
- Michael Coulson (1)
- Paul Reid (1)
