= 2008–09 Barnsley F.C. season =

Barnsley
2008–09 season
- Owner: Patrick Cryne
- Manager: Simon Davey
- Stadium: Oakwell
- Championship: 20th
- FA Cup: Third round
- League Cup: First round
- Top goalscorer: League: Jamal Campbell-Ryce (9); Jon Macken (9); All: Campbell-Ryce (9); Macken (9)
- Average home league attendance: 13,189
Home colours	Away colours	Third colours

The 2008–09 season was the 121st season of play for the Barnsley Football Club. It saw the club participate in the Football League Championship.

== Preparation for 2008–09 ==
The first signing for the new season was announced on 25 June; Canadian international striker Iain Hume arrived in a £1.2 million switch from the relegated Leicester City, the club's first seven-figure signing since 1999. On 27 June, Barnsley signed Argentine defensive midfielder Hugo Colace from Newell's Old Boys and French left winger turned left-back Mounir El Haimour from Swiss side Neuchâtel Xamax. On 2 July, a transfer was secured for experienced central defender Darren Moore of Derby County. The final pre-season transfer came on 8 August with a season-long loan deal for Maceo Rigters from Blackburn Rovers.

During the winter transfer window, on 26 January 2009, it was confirmed that Daniel Bogdanovic had signed for Barnsley for an undisclosed fee, signing a deal until 2010. Michael Mifsud also joined Barnsley on loan until the end of the season on 2 February 2009. On the same day as Andranik Teymourian and Adam Hammill joined fellow Malta teammate Daniel Bogdanovic at Oakwell.

=== Players in ===
	#	Player	Age (DOB)	Position	Previous club	Fee
(Jamaica)	4	Darren Moore	34 (22 April 1974)	Defender	Derby	Free
(Argentina)	5	Hugo Colace	24 (6 January 1984)	Defensive Midfielder	Newell's Old Boys	Free
(Canada)	7	Iain Hume	25 (30 October 1983)	Striker	Leicester	£1.2 m
(Peru)	8	Miguel Mostto	31 (11 January 1977)	Striker	Coronel Bolognesi	Loan return
(France)	11	Mounir El Haimour	29 (29 January 1980)	Midfielder	Neuchâtel Xamax	Free
(England)	17	Luke Steele	23 (24 September 1984)	Goalkeeper	West Brom	Free
(Scotland)	27	Gary Teale	30 (21 July 1978)	Winger	Derby	Loan
(Netherlands)	29	Maceo Rigters	24 (22 January 1984)	Striker	Blackburn	Loan
(England)	27	Jamie Cureton	33 (28 August 1975)	Striker	Norwich City	Loan
(Malta)	10	Daniel Bogdanovic	28 (26 March 1980)	Striker	Lokomotiv Sofia	Undisclosed
(Malta)	27	Michael Mifsud	27 (17 April 1981)	Striker	Coventry City F.C.	Loan
(Iran)	12	Andranik Teymourian	25 (6 March 1983)	Midfielder	Fulham	Loan
(England)	8	Adam Hammill	21 (25 January 1988)	Midfielder	Liverpool	Loan

=== Players out ===
	Player	Age (DOB)	Position	New Club	Fee
(England)	Paul Reid	26 (18 February 1982)	Defender	Colchester	Free
(England)	Sam Togwell	23 (14 October 1984)	Midfielder	Scunthorpe	Undisclosed
(Republic of Ireland)	Dwayne Mattis	27 (31 July 1981)	Midfielder	Walsall	Free
(Hungary)	István Ferenczi	(14 September 1977)	Striker	Ferencvaros	£250,000
(Wales)	Lewin Nyatanga	20 (18 August 1988)	Defender	Derby	Loan ended
(Wales)	Daniel Nardiello	25 (22 October 1982)	Striker	QPR	Loan ended
(Denmark)	Kim Christensen	28 (8 May 1980)	Striker	FC Midtjylland	Free

== Review ==
At the start of the 2008–09 season, Barnsley won only two of their first ten league matches and went five straight games without scoring a goal. The Reds clinched the loan signing of Derby winger Gary Teale for a month on 15 August, covering for the midfield injuries of Mounir El Haimour, Jamal Campbell-Ryce and the failure to gain international clearance for Hugo Colace.

The team received a boost the following month when Colace's work permit was finally granted, along with the return to fitness of both Heinz Muller and Anderson, who had been out injured for seven months. The club also made history in their away game at Ipswich Town on 30 September when they fielded striker Reuben Noble-Lazarus, who became the Football League's youngest ever player at 15 years and 45 days; surpassing a record which had stood since 1929.

The tykes achieved their second league win of the season as they managed to beat Doncaster Rovers 4–1 at Oakwell. However, the disappointing away form continued with a 3–0 defeat to Crystal Palace. The following Tuesday, the Reds defeated Sheffield Wednesday for the first time in eight years by prevailing 2–1. A 0–0 draw with Bristol City was next, the month ended with a 1–0 win over Doncaster Rovers at the Keepmoat Stadium.

The Reds continued their momentum in October, with an away win. This time against Charlton. The next game, at home to Sheffield Utd was extremely controversial. The main issue of the game was an injury to Barnsley striker Iain Hume, who suffered a fractured skull and internal bleeding after being elbowed by Chris Morgan. Barnsley are considering whether to pursue legal action against Morgan for the challenge which may have ended Hume's life as well as his career.

Barnsley defeated Watford, again coming from behind to win, before losing late on to play off candidates Preston North End F.C. Despite this, on the live sky game, and almost blowing a 3–0 lead, Burnley were beaten at Oakwell. 3–2.

== Competitions ==
=== Championship ===
==== League table ====
Pos	Team	Pld	W	D	L	GF	GA	GD	Pts	Promotion, qualification or relegation
18	Derby County	46	14	12	20	55	67	−12	54	
19	Nottingham Forest	46	13	14	19	50	65	−15	53	
20	Barnsley	46	13	13	20	45	58	−13	52	
21	Plymouth Argyle	46	13	12	21	44	57	−13	51	
22	Norwich City (R)	46	12	10	24	57	70	−13	46	Relegation to Football League One

Updated to match(es) played on 3 May 2009. Source: The Football League
Rules for classification: 1) points; 2) goal difference; 3) number of goals scored.
(R) Relegated

==== Results summary ====
Overall								Home						Away					
Pld	W	D	L	GF	GA	GD	Pts	W	D	L	GF	GA	GD	W	D	L	GF	GA	GD
46	13	13	20	45	58	−13	52	8	7	8	28	24	+4	5	6	12	17	34	−17

Source: 11v11

=== FA Cup ===
3 January 2009 Third round	West Ham United	3–0	Barnsley	London
15:00 GMT	Ilunga 10'; Noble 39' (pen.); Cole 68'	Report		Stadium: Boleyn Ground; Attendance: 28,869; Referee: Michael Oliver

=== League Cup ===
12 August 2008 First round	Crewe Alexandra	2–0	Barnsley	Crewe
19:45 BST	O'Connor 14' (pen.); Elding 36' (pen.)	Report		Stadium: Gresty Road; Attendance: 2,492; Referee: Anthony Taylor

== Goalscorers ==
League goals (cup goals)

- Jamal Campbell-Ryce 8
- Jon Macken 8
- Daniel Bogdanovic 4
- Iain Hume 4
- Stephen Foster 3
- Jamie Cureton* 2
- Anderson de Silva 2
- Michael Mifsud 2
- Darren Moore 1
- Simon Whaley* 1
- Diego León 1
- Kayode Odejayi 1
- Miguel Mostto* 1
- Brian Howard* 1
- Own goals 2

(*) No longer with the club.
