= 2006–07 Barnsley F.C. season =

Barnsley
2006–07 season
- Chairman: Gordon Shepherd
- Manager: Andy Ritchie (until 21 November); Simon Davey (from 21 November)
- Stadium: Oakwell
- Championship: 20th
- FA Cup: Third round
- League Cup: Second round
- Top goalscorer: Nardiello (9)
- Average home league attendance: 12,733

During the 2006–07 English football season, Barnsley F.C. competed in the Football League Championship.

== Season summary ==
During the early stages of the season, Ritchie was approached by Sheffield Wednesday about their vacant manager's position, following the sacking of Paul Sturrock in October 2006. However, the request was turned down by the club. Ritchie was sacked by Barnsley on 21 November 2006, with the team in the relegation zone of the League Championship.

Simon Davey was then appointed caretaker manager following Ritchie's dismissal. After a successful start he was given the job on a permanent basis at the end of the year, and later led the club to a successful fight against relegation at the end of the season.

== Final league table ==
Pos	Team	Pld	W	D	L	GF	GA	GD	Pts	Promotion, qualification or relegation
18	Queens Park Rangers	46	14	11	21	54	68	−14	53	
19	Leicester City	46	13	14	19	49	64	−15	53	
20	Barnsley	46	15	5	26	53	85	−32	50	
21	Hull City	46	13	10	23	51	67	−16	49	
22	Southend United (R)	46	10	12	24	47	80	−33	42	Relegation to Football League One

Source: RSSSF
Rules for classification: In the Football League goals scored (F) takes precedence over goal difference (GD).
(R) Relegated

== Results ==
=== Football League Championship ===
Championship match details
Date	Opponents	Venue	Result	Score F–A	Scorers	Attendance
5 August 2006	Cardiff City	H	L	1–2	Howard	12,082
8 August 2006	Hull City	A	W	3–2	McIndoe, Richards, Hayes	18,207
12 August 2006	Colchester United	A	W	2–1	Richards, Howard	4,249
19 August 2006	Southampton	H	D	2–2	Richards, Hayes (pen)	11,306
26 August 2006	Norwich City	A	L	1–5	Hayes	24,876
9 September 2006	Stoke City	H	D	2–2	Wright, Hayes	10,464
12 September 2006	Burnley	A	L	2–4	McIndoe (2)	10,304
16 September 2006	Wolverhampton Wanderers	H	W	1–0	Richards	11,350
22 September 2006	Preston North End	A	L	0–1		11,728
30 September 2006	Luton Town	H	L	1–2	Howard	10,175
14 October 2006	Sheffield Wednesday	A	L	1–2	Howard	28,687
17 October 2006	Plymouth Argyle	H	D	2–2	Kay, Richards	9,479
21 October 2006	Sunderland	A	L	0–2		27,918
28 October 2006	Coventry City	H	L	0–1		10,470
1 November 2006	Derby County	A	L	1–2	Hassell	21,295
4 November 2006	Leeds United	H	W	3–2	Devaney, McIndoe, Howard	16,943
11 November 2006	Birmingham City	A	L	0–2		19,344
18 November 2006	Crystal Palace	A	L	0–2		20,159
25 November 2006	Ipswich Town	H	W	1–0	McCann	10,556
28 November 2006	Southend United	H	W	2–0	Howard, Reid	9,588
2 December 2006	Leeds United	A	D	2–2	Nardiello (2)	21,378
10 December 2006	West Bromwich Albion	H	D	1–1	Hayes	9,512
16 December 2006	Leicester City	A	L	0–2		30,457
23 December 2006	Queens Park Rangers	A	L	0–1		11,307
26 December 2006	Burnley	H	W	1–0	Devaney	12,842
30 December 2006	Sheffield Wednesday	H	L	0–3		21,253
1 January 2007	Wolverhampton Wanderers	A	L	0–2		20,064
13 January 2007	Preston North End	H	L	0–1		10,810
20 January 2007	Luton Town	A	W	2–0	Howard, Devaney	7,441
30 January 2007	Queens Park Rangers	H	W	2–0	Richards, Howard	9,890
2 February 2007	Cardiff City	A	L	0–2		11,549
10 February 2007	Colchester United	H	L	0–3		11,192
17 February 2007	Southampton	A	L	2–5	Nardiello, Ferenczi	22,460
20 February 2007	Hull City	H	W	3–0	Ferenczi (2), Rajczi	12,526
26 February 2007	Stoke City	A	W	1–0	Ferenczi	13,114
3 March 2007	Norwich City	H	L	1–3	Ferenczi	11,010
10 March 2007	Sunderland	H	L	0–2		18,207
14 March 2007	Plymouth Argyle	A	W	4–2	Nyatanga, Devaney (2), Ferenczi	10,265
17 March 2007	Coventry City	A	L	1–4	Hassell	21,609
31 March 2007	Derby County	H	L	1–2	Togwell	17,059
7 April 2007	Ipswich Town	A	L	1–5	Nardiello	20,585
9 April 2007	Birmingham City	H	W	1–0	Nardiello	15,857
14 April 2007	Southend United	A	W	3–1	Nardiello (2), Reid	10,089
21 April 2007	Crystal Palace	H	W	2–0	Nardiello (2, 1 pen)	10,277
28 April 2007	Leicester City	H	L	0–1		20,012
6 May 2007	West Bromwich Albion	A	L	0–7		23,568

=== FA Cup ===
FA Cup match details
Round	Date	Opponents	Venue	Result	Score F–A	Scorers	Attendance
Third round	6 January 2007	Southend United	A	D	1–1	Coulson	5,485
Third round replay	16 January 2007	Southend United	H	L	0–2		4,944

=== League Cup ===
League Cup match details
Round	Date	Opponents	Venue	Result	Score F–A	Scorers	Attendance
First round	22 August 2006	Blackpool	A	D	2–2 (4–2 p)	Williams, Devaney	3,938
Second round	19 September 2006	Milton Keynes Dons	H	L	1–2	McIndoe	4,411

== Squad ==
Note: Flags indicate national team as defined under FIFA eligibility rules; some limited exceptions apply. Players may hold more than one non-FIFA nationality.

No.	Pos.	Nation	Player
1	GK	IRL	Nick Colgan
2	DF	ENG	Bobby Hassell
3	DF	ENG	Paul Heckingbottom
4	DF	ENG	Paul Reid
7	DF	ENG	Sam Togwell
8	FW	ENG	Paul Hayes
9	FW	HUN	István Ferenczi
10	MF	ENG	Ritchie Jones (on loan from Manchester United)
11	MF	ENG	Brian Howard
13	FW	HUN	Péter Rajczi (on loan from Újpest)
14	DF	ENG	Neil Austin
15	DF	ENG	Antony Kay
16	DF	ENG	Adam Eckersley (on loan from Manchester United)
17	MF	ENG	Nicky Wroe
18	MF	ENG	Kyel Reid (on loan from West Ham United)
19	MF	ENG	Dale Tonge
20	DF	ENG	Robbie Williams

No.	Pos.	Nation	Player
21	FW	ENG	Marc Richards
22	GK	WAL	Kyle Letheren
23	FW	WAL	Daniel Nardiello
24	FW	ENG	Michael Coulson
25	MF	ENG	Martin Devaney
26	MF	ENG	Simon Heslop
27	FW	ENG	Nathan Jarman
28	FW	ENG	Nathan Joynes
30	MF	NIR	Grant McCann
31	DF	ENG	Rob Atkinson
32	DF	ENG	Ryan Laight
33	DF	ENG	Thomas Harban
34	FW	SCO	Scott McGrory
35	DF	ENG	Rhys Meynell
36	GK	ENG	David Lucas
37	MF	ENG	Dwayne Mattis
38	DF	ENG	Luke Potter

=== Left club during season ===
Note: Flags indicate national team as defined under FIFA eligibility rules; some limited exceptions apply. Players may hold more than one non-FIFA nationality.

No.	Pos.	Nation	Player
5	DF	ENG	Ronnie Wallwork (on loan from West Bromwich Albion)
5	DF	WAL	Lewin Nyatanga (on loan from Derby County)
6	MF	IRL	Colin Healy (to Cork City)
9	FW	ENG	Leon Knight (on loan from Swansea City)
10	MF	SCO	Michael McIndoe (to Wolverhampton Wanderers)

No.	Pos.	Nation	Player
12	DF	SCO	Anthony McParland (to Wycombe Wanderers)
16	MF	ENG	Richard Kell (to Lincoln City)
18	GK	ITA	Vito Mannone (on loan from Arsenal)
29	FW	ENG	Tommy Wright (to Darlington)
