= Rob Kozluk =

English footballer (born 1977)

Personal information
- Full name: Robert Kozluk
- Date of birth: 5 August 1977 (age 49)
- Place of birth: Mansfield, England
- Height: 5 ft 8 in (1.73 m)
- Position: Right-back

Youth career
- 1995–1997: Derby County

Senior career*
Years	Team	Apps	(Gls)
1997–1999	Derby County	16	(0)
1999–2007	Sheffield United	213	(2)
2000	→ Huddersfield Town (loan)	14	(0)
2001	→ Wigan Athletic (loan)	0	(0)
2005	→ Preston North End (loan)	1	(0)
2007–2010	Barnsley	75	(0)
2010–2011	Sheffield United	8	(1)
2011	Port Vale	6	(0)
2012	Bradford City	17	(0)
2013	Ilkeston	17	(0)
Total		367	(3)

International career
1998	England U21	2	(0)
- * Club domestic league appearances and goals

Robert Kozluk (born 5 August 1977) is an English former footballer who played primarily as a right-back.

Born in Mansfield, he came through the Derby County youth team ranks before turning professional in 1997 before joining Sheffield United in March 1999. He spent eight years with the Blades and made close to 250 appearances for the club, helping them to the Premier League at the end of the 2005–06 season. A three-year spell at Barnsley followed, after which he returned to Sheffield United for a further season, although he was a rarely used squad player by this time. He joined Port Vale on a short-term deal in September 2011 before signing with Bradford City for the remainder of the season in January 2012. He joined Ilkeston in January 2013 and retired in October.

Kozluk has also had loan spells at Huddersfield Town in 2000, Preston North End in 2005 and 17 days on loan at Wigan Athletic in 2001 where he failed to make a single first-team appearance. He was also capped twice for the England under-21s.

== Club career ==
=== Derby County ===
Kozluk started his career at Premier League Derby County, where he made his debut in the League Cup on 16 September 1997, playing the full ninety minutes of a 1–0 win over Southend United at Roots Hall. The following month, he won a second start, helping the club beat Tottenham Hotspur 2–1 at White Hart Lane in the next round of the competition. He made his league debut at Anfield on 25 October, in what ended as a 4–0 win for Liverpool. He played four games in November, starting with a 3–0 win over Arsenal and ending with a 4–0 defeat to Chelsea at Stamford Bridge. He made twelve appearances in 1997–98. Kozluk gained two caps for the England under 21s in summer 1998, where he played in the Toulon Tournament alongside Frank Lampard and Emile Heskey.

He was in and out of the first team in 1998–99 and made ten appearances, seven of which were in the Premiership, before his transfer in March 1999.

=== Sheffield United ===
In March 1999, Kozluk signed for Sheffield United as part of a swap deal that took Vassilios Borbokis to Derby and made his United debut in a 3–2 defeat to Tranmere Rovers at Prenton Park.

The following season, retaining his first-team place under new manager Neil Warnock, Kozluk made 43 appearances, however, at the start of the 2000–01 campaign he joined First Division rivals Huddersfield Town on a three-month loan deal. Having made 14 appearances for the Terriers, he returned to Sheffield United, where he managed to win back his first-team spot and played regularly until the end of the season.

In September 2001, Kozluk again left Bramall Lane on loan. However, this time he would not make it onto the pitch for Second Division side Wigan Athletic. He returned to the Blades but found himself out of favour, playing just nine games during the 2001–02 season. Back in the first team in 2002–03, he played 35 league games scoring his first-ever senior goal with a 30 yards (27 m) strike against Grimsby Town on 4 March. United went on to have a memorable season as they pushed for promotion to the Premier League and reached the latter stages of both major cup competitions. Kozluk appeared in the play-off final at the Millennium Stadium, where United lost 3–0 to Wolves. and played in the club's FA Cup semi-final defeat to eventual winners Arsenal.

Kozluk made a total of 47 appearances in 2003–04, as the Blades recorded an eighth-place finish, during which he also scored the second goal of his career when he knocked one past Stoke City's Ed de Goey at the Britannia Stadium on 1 November. Injuries at the start of the season meant that Kozluk lost his place in the first-team missed the whole first half of the 2004–05 campaign, the inaugural season of the Championship. He was allowed to join Championship rivals Preston North End on a one-month loan in January 2005 where he played in one FA Cup and one league games for the Lilywhites before returning to Bramall Lane where he played a further nine games before the end of the season.

United finally won promotion to the Premier League in the 2005–06 season, finishing runners-up in the Championship, during which Kozluk played 27 league games. A further 20 first-team appearances followed in the top flight the following season, but the club failed to consolidate their top-flight status and were relegated in a final day showdown with Wigan Athletic. With the club looking to rebuild and cut costs, United released Kozluk at the end of the season. At the time of his departure he was United's longest-serving player, having made 236 league and cup appearances for the club.

=== Barnsley ===
In July 2007, Kozluk turned down a contract at Sheffield United and Leeds United to sign for Championship side Barnsley, after manager Simon Davey offered him the highest wages at the club. The club described the signing as a 'massive coup'. Helping the club to avoid relegation by the end of the 2007–08 season, he also played a role in the club reaching the FA Cup FA Cup semi-finals, helping the Tykes to overcome Liverpool at Anfield, and Chelsea at Oakwell, before ultimately losing 1–0 to Cardiff City in the semi-finals at Wembley.

Kozluk was used on the left side of the defence in the 2008–09 campaign and recorded 38 appearances. However, he failed to hold down a first-team place in 2009–10, and missed the last few months of the season with a knee injury. With his contract expiring and the club looking to reduce the wage bill, Barnsley released him in June 2010.

=== Return to Sheffield United ===
In July 2010, Kozluk signed for Sheffield United for the second time on a one-year deal. Signed as a squad player he made little impact on the Blades first-team until he was given a run of games by new manager Micky Adams in January. In his second start of the season he scored with a late volley against local rivals Doncaster Rovers to earn United a 2–2 draw. This was only his third career goal and his first-ever goal at Bramall Lane in his two spells with the club. At the end of the campaign he was offered a new contract by Adams' replacement, Danny Wilson, however, he turned down the offer in the hope of finding a new club.

=== Port Vale ===
Kozluk spent September 2011 training at Burton Albion whilst considering his options, before rejoining his former boss Micky Adams at League Two club Port Vale on 22 September, signing a short-term contract until 1 January 2012. This was the first time the 34-year-old would play outside of the top two tiers of English football and he faced competition for the right-back slot from Adam Yates. Having been limited to just seven appearances during his stay at Vale Park, Kozluk departed in search of a new club two days before Christmas.

=== Bradford City ===
On 11 January 2012, Bradford City signed Kozluk on a contract lasting until the end of the 2011–12 season, as manager Phil Parkinson looked to use Kozluk as cover for an injured Simon Ramsden. He made his debut on 14 January in a 2–2 home draw with Morecambe, but Kozluk was released from Bradford in May 2012 after being told his contract would not be renewed. Parkison told the press that he was looking for a younger full-back, though did not rule out re-signing Kozluk as emergency cover.

=== Ilkeston and post retirement career ===
Kozluk joined Northern Premier League side Ilkeston as a player-coach in January 2013, dropping outside of the English Football League for the first time. Manager Kevin Wilson said: "Although Rob has not been playing this season, he has been training regularly with Chesterfield and, in my opinion, he is still more than capable of doing a job for a Football League club. He has vast experience with more than 300 League games at a high level, and that's a commodity that we feel we're a bit short of at the moment. Obviously his ability to play in numerous positions will also be a big asset." The club finished 12th in 2012–13, and Kozluk retired in October 2013 to concentrate on a coaching role at the club.

In the following years, Kozluk also worked in scouting positions at both Derby County and Stoke City.

== Personal life ==
His son, Ziggy, also became a professional footballer who played as a full-back and debuted for Barnsley in October 2024.

== Career statistics ==
Appearances and goals by club, season and competition
Club	Season	League			FA Cup		League Cup		Other		Total	
Club	Season	Division	Apps	Goals	Apps	Goals	Apps	Goals	Apps	Goals	Apps	Goals
Derby County	1997–98	Premier League	9	0	1	0	2	0	—		12	0
Derby County	1998–99	Premier League	7	0	2	0	1	0	—		10	0
Derby County	Total		16	0	3	0	3	0	—		22	0
Sheffield United	1998–99	First Division	10	0	—		—		—		10	0
Sheffield United	1999–2000	First Division	39	0	2	0	2	0	—		43	0
Sheffield United	2000–01	First Division	27	0	1	0	0	0	—		28	0
Sheffield United	2001–02	First Division	8	0	0	0	1	0	—		9	0
Sheffield United	2002–03	First Division	32	1	4	0	2	0	3 (Note: Appearances in First Division play-offs)	0	41	1
Sheffield United	2003–04	First Division	42	1	3	0	2	0	—		47	1
Sheffield United	2004–05	Championship	9	0	0	0	0	0	—		9	0
Sheffield United	2005–06	Championship	27	0	1	0	1	0	—		29	0
Sheffield United	2006–07	Premier League	19	0	0	0	1	0	—		20	0
Sheffield United	Total		213	2	11	0	9	0	3	0	236	2
Huddersfield Town (loan)	2000–01	First Division	14	0	—		—		—		14	0
Wigan Athletic (loan)	2001–02	Second Division	0	0	—		—		—		0	0
Preston North End (loan)	2004–05	Championship	1	0	1	0	—		—		2	0
Barnsley	2007–08	Championship	24	0	4	0	2	0	—		30	0
Barnsley	2008–09	Championship	37	0	0	0	1	0	—		38	0
Barnsley	2009–10	Championship	14	0	0	0	4	0	—		18	0
Barnsley	Total		75	0	4	0	7	0	0	0	86	0
Sheffield United	2010–11	Championship	8	1	1	0	1	0	—		10	1
Port Vale	2011–12	League Two	6	0	1	0	—		—		7	0
Bradford City	2011–12	League Two	17	0	—		—		—		17	0
Ilkeston	2012–13	NPL Premier Division	7	0	—		—		2 (Note: Appearances in Derbyshire Senior Cup)	0	9	0
Ilkeston	2013–14	NPL Premier Division	10	0	1	0	—		—		11	0
Ilkeston	Total		17	0	1	0	0	0	2	0	20	0
Career total			367	3	22	0	20	0	5	0	414	3

== Honours ==
Sheffield United

- Championship second-place promotion: 2005–06
