= Luke Steele (footballer) =

English footballer

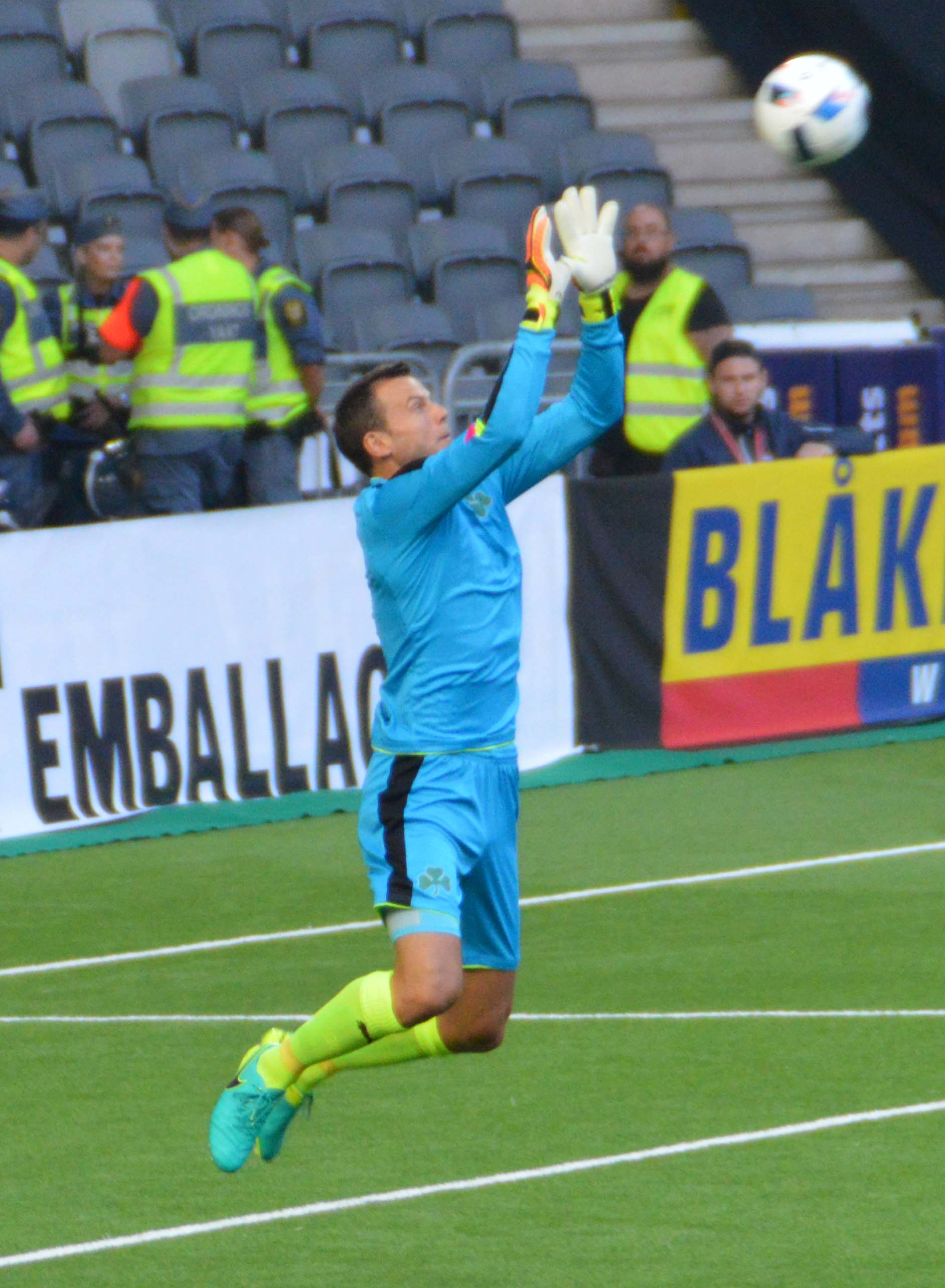
- Luke Steele playing for Panathinaikos in 2016.

Personal information
- Full name: Luke David Steele
- Date of birth: 24 September 1984 (age 42)
- Place of birth: Peterborough, England
- Height: 6 ft 2 in (1.88 m)
- Positions: Goalkeeper; forward

Youth career
- 1993–1999: Peterborough United

Senior career*
Years	Team	Apps	(Gls)
1999–2002	Peterborough United	2	(0)
2002–2006	Manchester United	0	(0)
2004–2005	→ Coventry City (loan)	32	(0)
2006	→ Coventry City (loan)	0	(0)
2006–2008	West Bromwich Albion	2	(0)
2006–2007	→ Coventry City (loan)	5	(0)
2008	→ Barnsley (loan)	14	(0)
2008–2014	Barnsley	195	(0)
2014–2017	Panathinaikos	66	(0)
2017–2018	Bristol City	5	(0)
2018–2020	Nottingham Forest	2	(0)
2019–2020	→ Millwall (loan)	1	(0)
2020	→ Millwall (loan)	0	(0)
2020–2021	Stamford	2	(0)
2021	Notts County	3	(0)
2021–2022	Deeping Rangers	9	(2)
Total		337	(2)

International career^{‡}
2002	England U18	3	(0)
2002–2003	England U19	9	(0)
2004–2005	England U20	2	(0)

Managerial career
- 2023–2025: Peterborough Sports
- * Club domestic league appearances and goals as of 12:17, 22 April 2021 (UTC) ‡ National team caps and goals as of 8:08, 25 September 2015 (UTC)

Luke David Steele (born 24 September 1984) is an English football manager and former professional footballer. He was most recently joint-manager of National League North side Peterborough Sports.

As a player he played professionally as a goalkeeper but spent his final season in the game playing as a forward. He came through the youth academy at Peterborough United before signing for Premier League side Manchester United. Whilst with United he had an extensive loan spell with Coventry City which lead to a permanent, though short-lived, move to West Bromwich Albion. He also played in the Football League with Barnsley, Bristol City, Nottingham Forest and Millwall, as well as stints with Greek side Panathinaikos. He ended his career with a stint at non-league Stamford before a spell with Notts County in the National League. Between 2021 and 2022 he played for non-league side Deeping Rangers as an outfield player.

He was capped internationally at England U18, U19 and U20 level.

== Club career ==
=== Peterborough United ===
Born in Peterborough, Steele started his career at local side Peterborough United, where he played alongside Ryan Semple and Sean St Ledger. In December 2001, Steele spent a week on trial with Manchester United, for whom he played in two matches with the club's under-17s side. He returned for three more under-17s appearances and two for the reserves on a month-long loan spell in March 2002. After returning to Peterborough in April 2002, he made his senior debut in a 2–2 draw away to Reading on 13 April. After another appearance in a 2–1 home win over Bury a week later, Manchester United paid Peterborough £500,000 on 11 May to sign Steele on a four-year contract, with the fee potentially rising to £2.25 million after a certain number of first-team appearances.

=== Manchester United ===
Steele began the 2002–03 season as the starting goalkeeper for the Manchester United reserve team, before being usurped by the likes of Ricardo and Roy Carroll, and becoming a regular in the under-19s. Over the course of the season, Steele made 27 appearances for the under-19s, including eight in the FA Youth Cup, in which Manchester United beat Middlesbrough 3–1 on aggregate in the final. He also made a total of three appearances for the reserves, including a 2–1 defeat to Oldham Athletic in the Manchester Senior Cup on 13 February 2003.

In 2003–04, Steele competed for the starting place in the under-19s side with Tom Heaton, but made just four appearances between August and October before being ruled out for the rest of the season. He made his return in the build-up to the 2004–05 season, playing for the reserves in a friendly against Irish side Cobh Ramblers, before making his first appearance for the Manchester United first team in a 3–1 win over Burnley in Stan Ternent's testimonial on 17 August 2004; after coming on as a substitute for Tim Howard in the 29th minute, Steele was himself replaced by Heaton in the 76th. He then made two league appearances for the reserves before joining Coventry City on a three-month loan on 10 September 2004. After conceding 30 goals in 18 appearances in those initial three months, the clubs agreed to extend Steele's loan until the end of the season. He finished the season with 62 goals conceded in 36 matches.

Steele returned to Manchester United for the 2005–06 season, where, with Ricardo and Carroll having left the club, and Ben Foster and Tom Heaton out on loan, he became the club's third-choice goalkeeper behind Edwin van der Sar and Tim Howard. After coming on for Van der Sar in the 75th minute of a 3–0 pre-season friendly win over Beijing Hyundai, Steele was an unused substitute in four more first-team matches that season, including two matches in the early rounds of Manchester United's League Cup-winning campaign and the FA Cup third round draw with Burton Albion. He also made 19 appearances for the reserves as they won the Premier Reserve League title, the North/South Play-off Shield and the Manchester Senior Cup.

In July 2006, Steele was part of the Manchester United party for their pre-season tour of South Africa, where he shared goalkeeping duties with Ben Foster. He only played in one of the three games, starting the final match against Kaizer Chiefs and making a noteworthy save from Shaun Bartlett's header before being replaced by Foster in the 77th minute. He played in one more friendly match for the first team, a 2–1 defeat away to Preston North End, before joining Coventry City on loan for a second time on 4 August 2006. However, the loan was cut short after just six days when Steele and defender Paul McShane were transferred to West Bromwich Albion as part of the deal that took Tomasz Kuszczak to Manchester United.

=== West Bromwich Albion ===
On 23 December 2006, Steele once again joined Coventry on an initial seven-day emergency loan that was subsequently extended to the end of the season.

Steele made his Albion debut in a 2–1 win away at Leicester City on 8 December 2007.

In February 2008, he joined Barnsley on a one-month emergency loan. They required a goalkeeper for their fifth round FA Cup tie with Liverpool, as Heinz Müller was injured, while on-loan Tony Warner was cup-tied. Steele delivered a Man of the Match performance on his debut in a surprise victory over the Premier League side at Anfield, allowing Barnsley to progress to the quarter finals. He also won the FA Cup Player of the Round award for his performance in the game. He then helped Barnsley reach the semi-finals of the FA Cup by keeping a clean sheet against Chelsea in a game which they won 1–0.

On 17 March 2008, Steele returned from his loan, with talks deadlocked over who should pay his wages during a proposed extended loan period. He rejoined Barnsley three days later, after the two clubs agreed a further loan period until the end of the season, with a view to a permanent transfer. Steele represented Barnsley in the FA Cup semi-final at Wembley Stadium, where they lost 1–0 against Cardiff City.

=== Barnsley ===
A permanent transfer to Barnsley was completed on 21 May 2008, with Steele signing a one-year contract after his performances in the FA Cup.

On 9 July 2008, Steele was fined £1,000 by the FA for breaching shirt sponsorship rules; during the 2007–08 season he regularly wore an undergarment bearing a logo that was visible above the collar of his official goalkeeping kit. The FA warned him several times of this misconduct but Steele continued to wear the undergarment and was subsequently fined.

=== Panathinaikos ===
On 17 July 2014, Steele left Barnsley for Super League Greece club Panathinaikos after activating a clause allowing him to leave for nothing should the club be relegated from the Championship. He made 29 league appearances during the 2014–15 season as Panathinaikos finished second behind Olympiacos, plus another eight appearances in other competitions. On 29 June 2015, he extended his stay in Greece for another three years by signing a new contract until 2018. On 16 September 2016, English goalkeeper Luke Steele was included in UEFA Europa League's "Team of the Week", despite his team's home loss against AFC Ajax. After a string of below-par goalkeeping efforts in the month of November 2016, resulting in unfavourable team results and personal morale drop, Panathinaikos decided to remove him from first-choice keeper until further notice and bring youngster Odysseas Vlachodimos into the starting eleven.

=== Bristol City ===
On 31 August 2017, Steele signed a one-year contract with Bristol City, with an option of a further year.

He was released by Bristol City at the end of the 2017–18 season after making just 8 appearances, the highlight of which was in City's 2–1 win over defending champions Manchester United in the EFL Cup. Following this, Steele had a trial with Sheffield United during pre-season against Bradford City, but was not taken on by the club.

=== Nottingham Forest ===
On 1 August 2018, Steele signed a two-year deal with Nottingham Forest. He made his debut for Forest on 14 August in the first round of the 2018–19 EFL Cup against Bury as a substitute, after Jordan Smith had been sent off. The game finished 1–1 after 90 minutes with Forest going through to the second round 10–9 on penalties, one of which Steele scored for Forest.

On 8 August 2019, Steele was loaned to Championship side Millwall until January 2020.

On 31 January 2020, Steele was loaned back to Millwall for the remainder of the season.

=== Notts County ===
On 20 April 2021, Steele signed for Notts County on a short-term deal following an injury to first-choice goalkeeper Sam Slocombe.

=== Deeping Rangers ===
Prior to Steele joining the club, he played for local clubs Peterborough Northern Star reserves and Spalding Sunday League side Jubilee as a striker, as well as signing for Northern Premier League Division One South East side Stamford on 14 December 2020 in his natural position. In February 2021, following his time at Stamford, Steele was initially set to return to hometown club Peterborough as backup; however, the Football League blocked the move due to Steele already playing for three clubs during the 2020–21 season.

Steele would go on to sign for Deeping Rangers as a forward. On 4 January 2022, he scored the winning goal a 1–0 win over Sleaford Town.

=== Peterborough Sports ===
Steele arrived at Peterborough Sports in February 2023. He immediately made an impact, along with joint-manager Michael Gash, winning Manager of the Month, remaining undefeated in March.

== International career ==
Steele is an England youth international, having played for his country at under-18, under-19 and under-20 level. He made his under-18 debut against Italy on 4 March 2002, coming on as a second-half substitute in a 3–0 defeat. In June that year, he was selected for a four-team tournament in Lisbon against Portugal, Norway and Slovakia; he played in the games against Portugal and Slovakia.

In September 2002, Steele progressed to the England Under-19s team, making his debut in a 3–1 away win over Hungary at Hidegkuti Nándor Stadium in Budapest. He was the team's first-choice goalkeeper throughout qualification for the 2003 UEFA European Under-19 Championship, playing the first two games of each qualification round, before Lee Camp took over once qualification was secure. Steele started all three games at the finals in Liechtenstein in July 2003, but England were eliminated with just one win in three group games. Steele played just twice for the Under-20s, both friendlies, but he kept a clean sheet in both as England beat the Netherlands and Russia.

In September 2005, Steele was called up to the England Under-21s team, for the 2007 European Championship qualifiers against Austria and Poland. He was also called up in November 2005 for the England U-21 squad.

== Managerial career ==
On 8 February 2023, Steele agreed to become joint-manager of Peterborough Sports alongside Michael Gash. In there 3 seasons they achieved 3 record high finishes including a 12th place finish in there 3rd season. Following a poor start to the 2025–26 season that saw the club sitting bottom of the league with four points from eight matches, Gash and Steele were sacked.

== Career statistics ==
As of match played 27 August 2019

Appearances and goals by club, season and competition
Club	Season	League			National Cup		League Cup		Other		Total	
Club	Season	Division	Apps	Goals	Apps	Goals	Apps	Goals	Apps	Goals	Apps	Goals
Peterborough United	1999–2000	Third Division	0	0	0	0	0	0	0	0	0	0
Peterborough United	2000–01	Second Division	0	0	0	0	0	0	0	0	0	0
Peterborough United	2001–02	Second Division	2	0	0	0	0	0	0	0	2	0
Peterborough United	Total		2	0	0	0	0	0	0	0	2	0
Manchester United (loan)	2001–02	Premier League	0	0	0	0	0	0	0	0	0	0
Manchester United	2002–03	Premier League	0	0	0	0	0	0	0	0	0	0
Manchester United	2003–04	Premier League	0	0	0	0	0	0	0	0	0	0
Manchester United	2004–05	Premier League	0	0	0	0	0	0	0	0	0	0
Manchester United	2005–06	Premier League	0	0	0	0	0	0	0	0	0	0
Manchester United	2006–07	Premier League	0	0	0	0	0	0	0	0	0	0
Manchester United	Total		0	0	0	0	0	0	0	0	0	0
Coventry City (loan)	2004–05	Championship	32	0	2	0	2	0	—		36	0
Coventry City (loan)	2006–07	Championship	0	0	0	0	0	0	—		0	0
West Bromwich Albion	2006–07	Championship	0	0	0	0	0	0	0	0	0	0
West Bromwich Albion	2007–08	Championship	2	0	0	0	0	0	—		2	0
West Bromwich Albion	Total		2	0	0	0	0	0	—		2	0
Coventry City (loan)	2006–07	Championship	5	0	2	0	0	0	—		7	0
Barnsley (loan)	2007–08	Championship	14	0	3	0	0	0	—		17	0
Barnsley	2008–09	Championship	10	0	0	0	1	0	—		11	0
Barnsley	2009–10	Championship	39	0	1	0	3	0	—		43	0
Barnsley	2010–11	Championship	46	0	1	0	1	0	—		48	0
Barnsley	2011–12	Championship	36	0	1	0	1	0	—		38	0
Barnsley	2012–13	Championship	33	0	4	0	0	0	—		37	0
Barnsley	2013–14	Championship	31	0	1	0	1	0	—		33	0
Barnsley	Total		209	0	11	0	7	0	—		227	0
Panathinaikos	2014–15	Super League Greece	29	0	1	0	—		7 (Note: Three appearances in UEFA Europa League, four appearances in Super League Greece play-offs)	0	37	0
Panathinaikos	2015–16	Super League Greece	28	0	2	0	—		8 (Note: Two appearances in UEFA Europa League, six appearances in Super League Greece play-offs)	0	38	0
Panathinaikos	2016–17	Super League Greece	9	0	3	0	—		12 (Note: Ten appearances in UEFA Europa League, two appearances in Super League Greece play-offs)	0	24	0
Panathinaikos	2017–18	Super League Greece	0	0	0	0	—		0	0	0	0
Panathinaikos	Total		66	0	6	0	—		27	0	99	0
Bristol City	2017–18	Championship	5	0	1	0	4	0	—		10	0
Nottingham Forest	2018–19	Championship	2	0	1	0	4	0	—		7	0
Nottingham Forest	2019–20	Championship	0	0	0	0	0	0	—		0	0
Nottingham Forest	Total		2	0	1	0	4	0	—		7	0
Millwall (loan)	2019–20	Championship	0	0	0	0	2	0	—		2	0
Career total			323	0	23	0	19	0	27	0	392	0

== Honours ==
Individual

- Barnsley Player of the Season: 2011–12
