= Simon Heslop =

English footballer

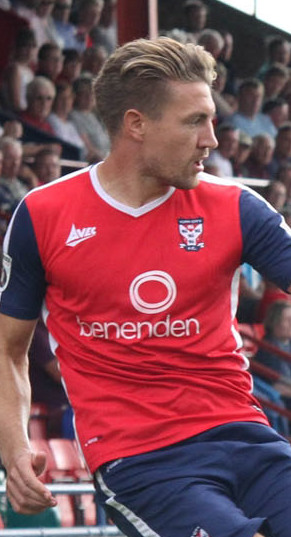
- Heslop playing for York City in 2017

Personal information
- Full name: Simon James Heslop
- Date of birth: 1 May 1987 (age 39)
- Place of birth: York, England
- Height: 5 ft 11 in (1.80 m)
- Position: Midfielder

Team information
- Current team: Pickering Town FC

Youth career
- –2004: Barnsley

Senior career*
Years	Team	Apps	(Gls)
2004–2010	Barnsley	1	(0)
2005–2006	→ Kidderminster Harriers (loan)	22	(1)
2006–2007	→ Tamworth (loan)	27	(1)
2007	→ Northwich Victoria (loan)	6	(0)
2007–2008	→ Halifax Town (loan)	30	(5)
2008	→ Grimsby Town (loan)	8	(0)
2009	→ Kettering Town (loan)	8	(0)
2010	→ Luton Town (loan)	11	(1)
2010–2013	Oxford United	91	(7)
2013–2014	Stevenage	27	(1)
2014–2015	Mansfield Town	25	(2)
2015–2016	Torquay United	20	(0)
2016	Wrexham	20	(3)
2016–2019	York City	84	(9)
2017	→ Eastleigh (loan)	5	(1)
2020	Boston United	3	(0)
2020–2021	Blyth Spartans	16	(3)
2021–2023	Scarborough Athletic	46	(1)
2023–2024	Liversedge	30	(1)
2024–2025	Bridlington Town	36	(2)
2025	Pickering Town		
- * Club domestic league appearances and goals as of 22:22, 28 June 2025 (UTC)

Simon James Heslop (born 1 May 1987) is an English professional footballer who plays as a midfielder for Pickering Town

Heslop started his career at Barnsley, signing his first professional deal with the club in 2005. He made just one first-team appearance during his six-year association with the club. During his time at Barnsley, Heslop was loaned out to Conference National club Kidderminster Harriers during the 2005–06 season, and spent the following season on loan with Tamworth. He then spent time on loan with Northwich Victoria and Halifax Town during 2007–08, before having further loan spells at Grimsby Town, Kettering Town and Luton Town respectively. He was released by Barnsley in May 2010, and signed for League Two club Oxford United shortly after. Heslop made over 100 appearances for Oxford during his three-year stay there. He was released at the end of 2012–13, and subsequently signed for League One club Stevenage on a free transfer in May 2013.

== Early life ==
Heslop was born in York and attended Huntington School.

== Career ==
=== Barnsley and loan spells ===
Heslop began his career at Barnsley, where he progressed through the youth team and signed his first professional contract with the club in 2005. After playing regularly for Barnsley's reserve team, Heslop went on loan to Conference National club Kidderminster Harriers at the start of the 2005–06 season, on an initial one-month deal. The Kidderminster manager, Stuart Watkiss, was formerly Barnsley's academy manager, and stated – "He immediately caught my eye during my time at Barnsley, and he's a lad with a lot of natural ability". He made his debut as a second-half substitute a day later, on 27 August, as Kidderminster drew 1–1 at home with Southport. After impressing during his time with the club, the loan agreement was extended for a further month, and then once again in October. Heslop scored his first goal for the club on 5 November 2005, firing home a "sublime shot" in a 2–1 home defeat to Exeter City. The loan deal was extended until the end of January 2006, and Heslop returned to his parent club having made 27 appearances for Kidderminster during the season. At the end of the season, on 31 May 2006, Heslop signed a new two-year deal at Barnsley.

Having made no first-team appearances for Barnsley, Heslop was loaned out for a second time in November 2006, joining another Conference National team in the form of Tamworth. He signed on an initial one-month deal, and made his debut in a 3–1 home victory over Woking. After making four starting appearances during his month at Tamworth, Heslop's loan was extended for another month, before later being extended for the remainder of Tamworth's 2006–07 season. He made 33 appearances in all competitions during his time with the club, scoring two goals. He returned to Barnsley at the end of April 2007, and made his first-team debut for the club a week later, coming on as a 63rd-minute substitute with the club already five goals down in an eventual 7–0 away loss to West Bromwich Albion.

In September 2007, Heslop spent a month on loan at Northwich Victoria, the third time he had been loaned out to a Conference Premier club. He played six times during his time with the club, before returning to his parent club after Northwich's 2–0 away defeat to Weymouth. Just a week after returning from his loan spell at Northwich, Heslop joined divisional rivals Halifax Town on a one-month loan agreement. He made his debut as a substitute in a 1–0 defeat to Aldershot Town on 20 October 2007, and scored in the club's next match, a 3–1 win over Evesham United in the FA Cup. Just four days later, on 3 November, Heslop scored his second goal in as many matches, opening the scoring with a left-footed finish as Halifax comfortably beat Crawley Town at The Shay. Following a successful first month with Halifax, during which he scored twice in four matches, the loan deal was extended on 16 November, for a further two months until January 2008. A day later, Heslop scored a long-range effort as Halifax came from two goals down to beat Stevenage at Broadhall Way. After being a regular fixture in Halifax's midfield for the following two months, Heslop's loan was extended once more, this time until the remainder of 2007–08. He scored twice within the space of two weeks to take his goal tally to five for the season; firstly scoring in a 2–1 reverse to Cambridge United, before scoring the winner with a shot from 20-yards against Weymouth. He also scored the only goal of the match in a 1–0 win over Ebbsfleet United on 10 April, and made 40 appearances in all competitions for Halifax.

Ahead of the 2008–09 season, back at Barnsley, Heslop trained with Rochdale with a view to a loan move. However, no transfer materialised, and he had a trial with Port Vale later that month, although "budget restrictions" meant the deal collapsed. A week before the start of the new season, Heslop joined League Two club Grimsby Town on an initial three-month loan deal, with the option to join permanently after the period was over. On securing the loan signing, Grimsby manager Alan Buckley said – "He is a bit of everything, a box-to-box player. He's got a good chance of starting next week if he impresses in training". He made his debut in a 0–0 home draw with Rochdale on the opening day of the season, and went on to make 11 appearances during the three-month period. Towards the latter stages of that season, in March 2009, Heslop spent a week on trial at Lincoln City, playing in a reserve match against Nottingham Forest.

In October 2009, over a year since his last first-team appearance for any club, Heslop was loaned out for a sixth time when he joined Kettering Town on a month-long deal. He made his debut on 31 October, playing the whole match in Kettering's 1–1 home draw with Stevenage. Heslop made five appearances during the month, including receiving a red card for two bookable offences in a home loss to Kidderminster Harriers, as the loan was extended for a further month. He made 12 appearances during his time with Kettering, three of which came in the FA Cup as the club were ultimately knocked out by Championship team Leeds United at Elland Road after extra-time, having taken them to a replay. Two months later, Heslop signed for fellow Conference Premier club Luton Town on a 28-day emergency loan in March 2010. He was brought in to replace Luton captain Kevin Nicholls, who had been ruled out for the rest of the season. Heslop started in Luton's 1–0 win over Wrexham shortly after, and scored his only goal for the club in a 4–0 win against Salisbury City at Kenilworth Road on 30 March. He made 13 appearances during his time with the club, including two appearances as Luton lost 2–0 on aggregate to York City in the Conference Premier play-off semi-final. Heslop was released by Barnsley at the end of 2009–10, having made just one appearance during his six-year association with the club.

=== Oxford United ===
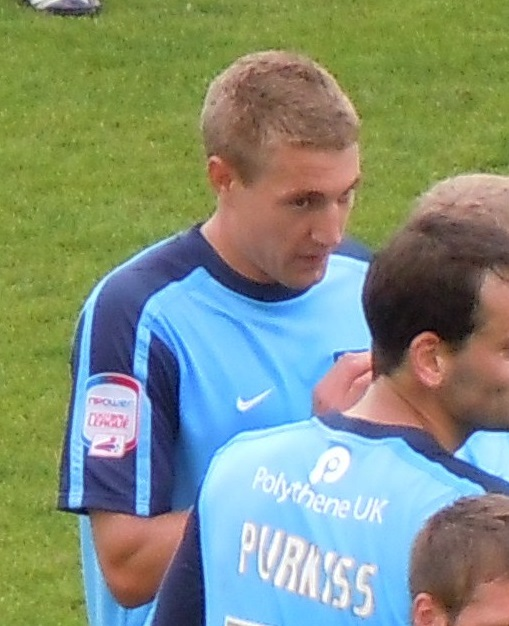
Heslop playing for Oxford United in 2010

Shortly after his release from Barnsley, Heslop joined League Two club Oxford United on a free transfer in June 2010. On signing Heslop, Oxford chairman Kelvin Thomas stated – "We are pleased to secure Simon's services. He is an excellent player and the encouraging thing about him signing is that he was made bigger financial offers at other clubs but wanted to come here". He made his debut on the opening day of 2010–11, playing the whole match as Oxford marked their return to the Football League with a 0–0 draw at Burton Albion. Just three days later, on 10 August 2010, Heslop scored twice in the club's 6–1 win over Bristol Rovers in the League Cup. He scored his first league goal the following month, netting with a 30-yard drive to open the scoring in an eventual 4–0 win over Morecambe at the Kassam Stadium. Heslop then scored with a "drilled right-foot shot" as Oxford secured a 2–1 home victory against Macclesfield Town on 28 December 2010. He added one further goal to his tally that season, scoring in the first-half from Jack Midson's cut-back in a 2–1 home win against Rotherham United in February 2011. Heslop scored five times, all at the Kassam, and made 40 appearances during his first season with the club.

The 2011–12 season started well for Heslop, scoring twice in the club's opening two home matches of the season. The first of which was courtesy of a "25-yard drive following a surging run" in a 1–1 draw with Bradford City at the Kassam, while the second came three days later when he scored a "stunning opener" from 35-yards out in a victory against Shrewsbury Town. Heslop scored yet another long-range strike in September that year, "thumping" Oxford ahead with an effort from 25-yards in a 2–0 win over Barnet at Underhill, his first goal away from Oxford's home ground. The goal ultimately turned out to be Heslop's last of the season, and he went on to make 32 appearances as Oxford finished ninth in League Two, four points behind the last play-off place. He remained at Oxford for 2012–13, and made 30 appearances as Oxford once again finished in a mid-table position. His only goal of the season came on 9 March 2013, scoring with a low shot in a 3–1 victory over Torquay United at Plainmoor. Shortly after the end of the season, in May 2013, Heslop was released by Oxford upon the expiry of his contract. During his three-year stay at Oxford, Heslop made 102 appearances and scored nine goals.

=== Stevenage, Torquay United and Wrexham ===
Following his release from Oxford, Heslop signed for League One club Stevenage on a free transfer on 21 May 2013. He made his debut for the club on the opening day of 2013–14, playing the whole match as Stevenage lost 4–3 to Oldham Athletic at Broadhall Way. He scored his first league goal for the club away to Gillingham on 26 November 2013. On 12 May 2014, Heslop was released by Stevenage.

In August 2015, Heslop joined Torquay United.

He signed for Wrexham in January 2016.

=== York City ===
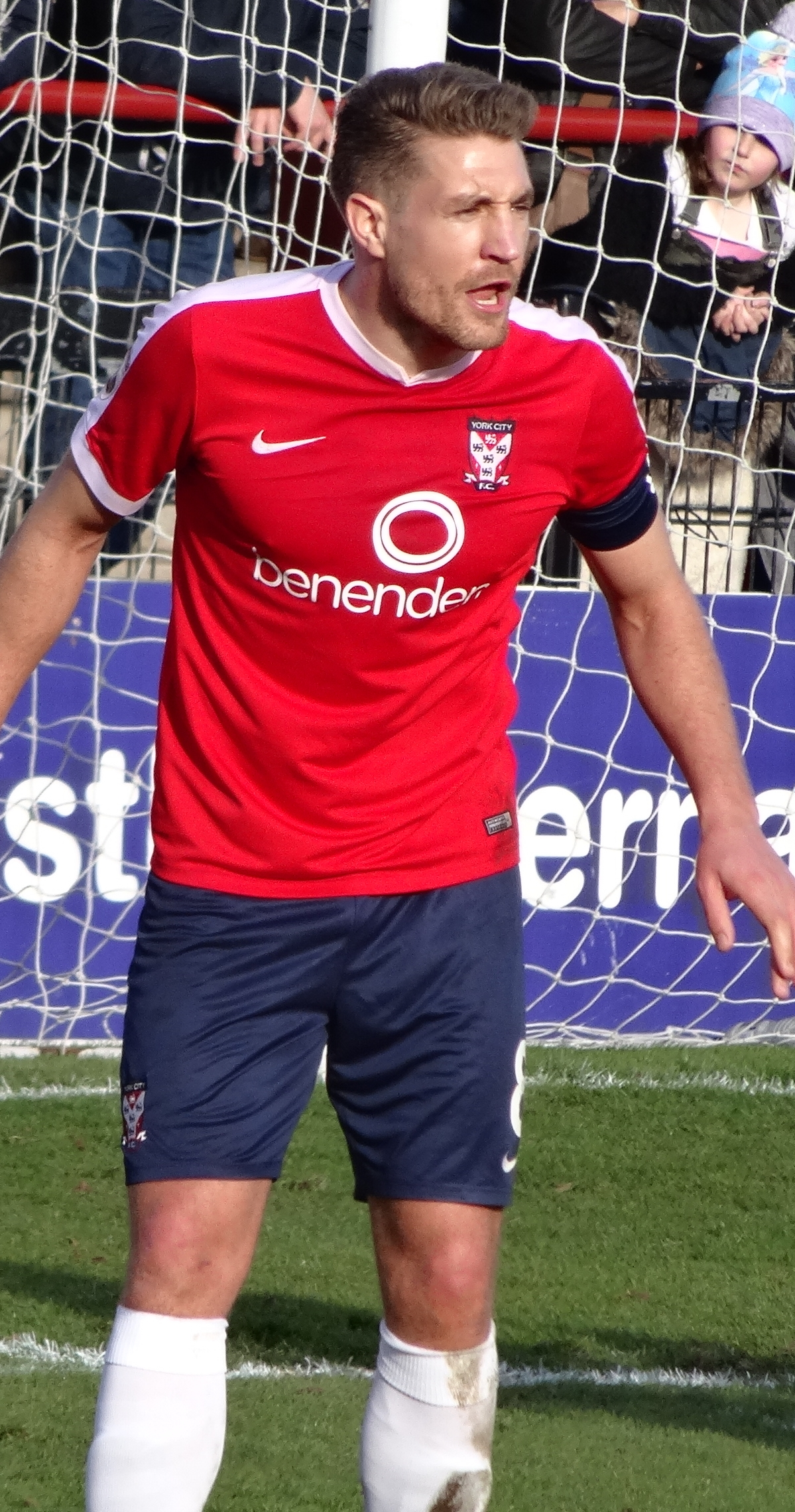
Heslop playing for York City in 2017

Heslop signed for his hometown club York City, who were newly relegated into the National League, on 20 June 2016 on a two-year contract. He captained York as they beat Macclesfield Town 3–2 at Wembley Stadium in the 2017 FA Trophy Final on 21 May.

Heslop requested a transfer in early November 2017, with manager Martin Gray dropping him from the team as a result. Heslop joined National League club Eastleigh on 16 November 2017 on a one-month loan. He made his debut two days later, starting in a 2–0 home defeat to Barrow. Heslop scored his first goal for Eastleigh in a 3–3 draw away to FC Halifax Town on 25 November 2017 with a shot from Chris Zebroski's cross. He made five appearances and scored one goal for Eastleigh, with the club opting to not extend his loan. York manager Martin Gray reiterated that Heslop would not be considered for selection upon his return to the club.

Heslop was ruled out for the rest of the 2018–19 season in February 2019, with a knee injury that required a second operation. He was not offered a new contract at the end of the season but was invited to return for pre-season training.

=== Boston United ===
Heslop signed for National League North club Boston United on 6 February 2020.

=== Blyth Spartans ===
Heslop signed for National League North club Blyth Spartans on 26 August 2020.

=== Scarborough Athletic ===
On 10 August 2021, Heslop signed for Scarborough Athletic. Following promotion to the National League North at the end of his first season, Heslop extended his contract till the end of the 2022–23 season. He departed the club in July 2023.

=== Later career ===
In July 2024, Heslop joined fellow NPL Division One East side Bridlington Town. After one season with the club, he joined Northern Counties East Premier Division side Pickering Town.

== Career statistics ==
As of end of 2024–25 season

Appearances and goals by club, season and competition
Club	Season	League			FA Cup		League Cup		Other		Total	
Club	Season	Division	Apps	Goals	Apps	Goals	Apps	Goals	Apps	Goals	Apps	Goals
Barnsley	2004–05	League One	0	0	0	0	0	0	0	0	0	0
Barnsley	2005–06	League One	0	0	—		0	0	0	0	0	0
Barnsley	2006–07	Championship	1	0	—		0	0	—		1	0
Barnsley	2007–08	Championship	0	0	—		0	0	—		0	0
Barnsley	2008–09	Championship	0	0	0	0	—		—		0	0
Barnsley	2009–10	Championship	0	0	—		0	0	—		0	0
Barnsley	Total		1	0	0	0	0	0	0	0	1	0
Kidderminster Harriers (loan)	2005–06	Conference National	22	1	1	0	—		4 (Note: Three appearances in Football League Trophy, one appearance and one goal in FA Trophy)	1	27	2
Tamworth (loan)	2006–07	Conference National	27	1	2	0	—		4 (Note: Appearance(s) in FA Trophy)	1	33	2
Northwich Victoria (loan)	2007–08	Conference Premier	6	0	—		—		—		6	0
Halifax Town (loan)	2007–08	Conference Premier	30	5	3	1	—		7 (Note: Three appearances in Conference League Cup, four appearances and one goal in FA Trophy)	1	40	7
Grimsby Town (loan)	2008–09	League Two	8	0	—		2	0	1 (Note: Appearance(s) in Football League Trophy)	0	11	0
Kettering Town (loan)	2009–10	Conference Premier	8	0	3	0	—		1	0	12	0
Luton Town (loan)	2009–10	Conference Premier	11	1	—		—		2 (Note: Appearances in Conference Premier play-offs)	0	13	1
Oxford United	2010–11	League Two	38	3	0	0	2	2	0	0	40	5
Oxford United	2011–12	League Two	29	3	1	0	0	0	2	0	32	3
Oxford United	2012–13	League Two	24	1	1	0	2	0	3	0	30	1
Oxford United	Total		91	7	2	0	4	2	5	0	102	9
Stevenage	2013–14	League One	27	1	3	0	2	0	3	0	35	1
Mansfield Town	2014–15	League Two	25	2	3	0	1	0	1	0	30	2
Torquay United	2015–16	National League	20	0	1	0	—		2	0	23	0
Wrexham	2015–16	National League	20	3	—		—		—		20	3
York City	2016–17	National League	44	4	2	0	—		6	1	52	5
York City	2017–18	National League North	28	4	2	0	—		—		30	4
York City	2018–19	National League North	12	1	3	0	—		0	0	15	1
York City	Total		84	9	7	0	—		6	1	97	10
Eastleigh (loan)	2017–18	National League	5	1	—		—		0	0	5	1
Boston United	2019–20	National League North	3	0	—		—		1 (Note: Appearances in National League North play-offs)	0	4	0
Blyth Spartans	2020–21	National League North	1	0	1	3	—		0	0	2	3
Scarborough Athletic	2021–22	NPL Premier Division	23	1	1	0	—		4 (Note: Three appearances in North Riding Senior Cup, one appearance in NPL Premier Division play-offs)	0	28	1
Scarborough Athletic	2022–23	National League North	22	0	3	0	—		1	0	26	0
Scarborough Athletic	Total		45	1	4	0	0	0	5	0	54	1
Liversedge	2023–24	NPL Division One East	30	1	1	0	—		3 (Note: One appearance in FA Trophy, two appearances in West Riding County Cup)	0	34	1
Bridlington Town	2024–25	NPL Division One East	36	2	0	0	—		1	0	37	2
Career total			501	35	31	4	9	2	46	4	586	45

== Honours ==
York City

- FA Trophy: 2016–17
