= 2009 Football League Championship play-off final =

Association football match in London

- The match was played at Wembley Stadium.
Burnley	Sheffield United
1	0
- Date: 25 May 2009
- Venue: Wembley Stadium, London
- Referee: Mike Dean (Wirral)
- Attendance: 80,518
- Weather: Sunny

The 2009 Football League Championship play-off final was an association football match which was played on 25 May 2009 at Wembley Stadium, London, between Burnley and Sheffield United. The match was to determine the third and final team to gain promotion from the Football League Championship, the second tier of English football, to the Premier League. The top two teams of the 2008–09 Football League Championship season gained automatic promotion to the Premier League, while the clubs placed from third to sixth place in the table partook in play-off semi-finals; Sheffield United ended the season in third position while Burnley finished fifth. The winners of these semi-finals competed for the final place for the 2009–10 season in the Premier League.

The 2009 final, refereed by Mike Dean, was watched by a crowd of more than 80,000 people. Burnley won 1–0, with the only goal of the game coming from Wade Elliott in the first half. Substitute Jamie Ward was sent off in the second half following two deliberate handballs, while his teammate Lee Hendrie was also dismissed after the final whistle. Victory for Burnley meant they returned to top flight football for the first time in 33 years.

Burnley ended the next season in 18th place in the Premier League and were relegated back to the Championship. Sheffield United finished the following season in 8th place, five points outside the play-offs.

== Route to the final ==
Football League Championship final table, leading positions
Pos	Team	Pld	W	D	L	GF	GA	GD	Pts
1	Wolverhampton Wanderers	46	27	9	10	80	52	+28	90
2	Birmingham City	46	23	14	9	54	37	+17	83
3	Sheffield United	46	22	14	10	64	39	+25	80
4	Reading	46	21	14	11	72	40	+32	77
5	Burnley	46	21	13	12	72	60	+12	76
6	Preston North End	46	21	11	14	66	54	+12	74

Sheffield United finished the regular 2008–09 season in third place in the Football League Championship, the second tier of the English football league system, two places and four points ahead of Burnley. Both therefore missed out on the two automatic places for promotion to the Premier League and instead took part in the play-offs to determine the third promoted team. Sheffield United finished three points behind Birmingham City (who were promoted in second place) and ten behind league winners Wolverhampton Wanderers.

Burnley faced Reading in their play-off semi-final, the first leg of which took place at Turf Moor. Reading dominated the match, but Kevin Doyle's shot was blocked on the line; he was later substituted having suffered an Achilles tendon injury. The game was decided late in the second half when Graham Alexander scored for Burnley from the penalty spot after a foul Steven Thompson by Reading's defender André Bikey. Late into injury time, Bikey was sent off for stamping on Burnley's Robbie Blake, and the match ended 1–0. The second leg, at the Madejski Stadium, was played three days later. Goalless at half time, with Reading limited to few chances, a 51st minute strike from 25 yards (23 m) by Martin Paterson put Burnley 1–0 up in the game and 2–0 ahead on aggregate. Seven minutes later, Thompson with a looping volley from outside the left-hand corner of the penalty box doubled Burnley's lead but despite further chances for them, no more goals were scored and the semi-final ended 3–0 on aggregate to Burnley.

In the other play-off semi-final, Sheffield United's opponents were Preston North End, with the first leg being played at Deepdale. The home team took the lead in the first half after Sean St Ledger scored, but the tie was level soon into the second half, with a volley from Brian Howard 21 seconds after kick-off. No further goals were scored and the match ended as a 1–1 draw. The return leg at Bramall Lane was decided by a single goal: Greg Halford's 59th minute header secured a 1–0 win for United on the night, and a 2–1 aggregate victory.

Sheffield United			Round	Burnley
Opponent	Result	Legs	Semi-finals	Opponent	Result	Legs
Preston North End	2–1	1–1 away; 1–0 home		Reading	3–0	1–0 home; 2–0 away

== Match ==
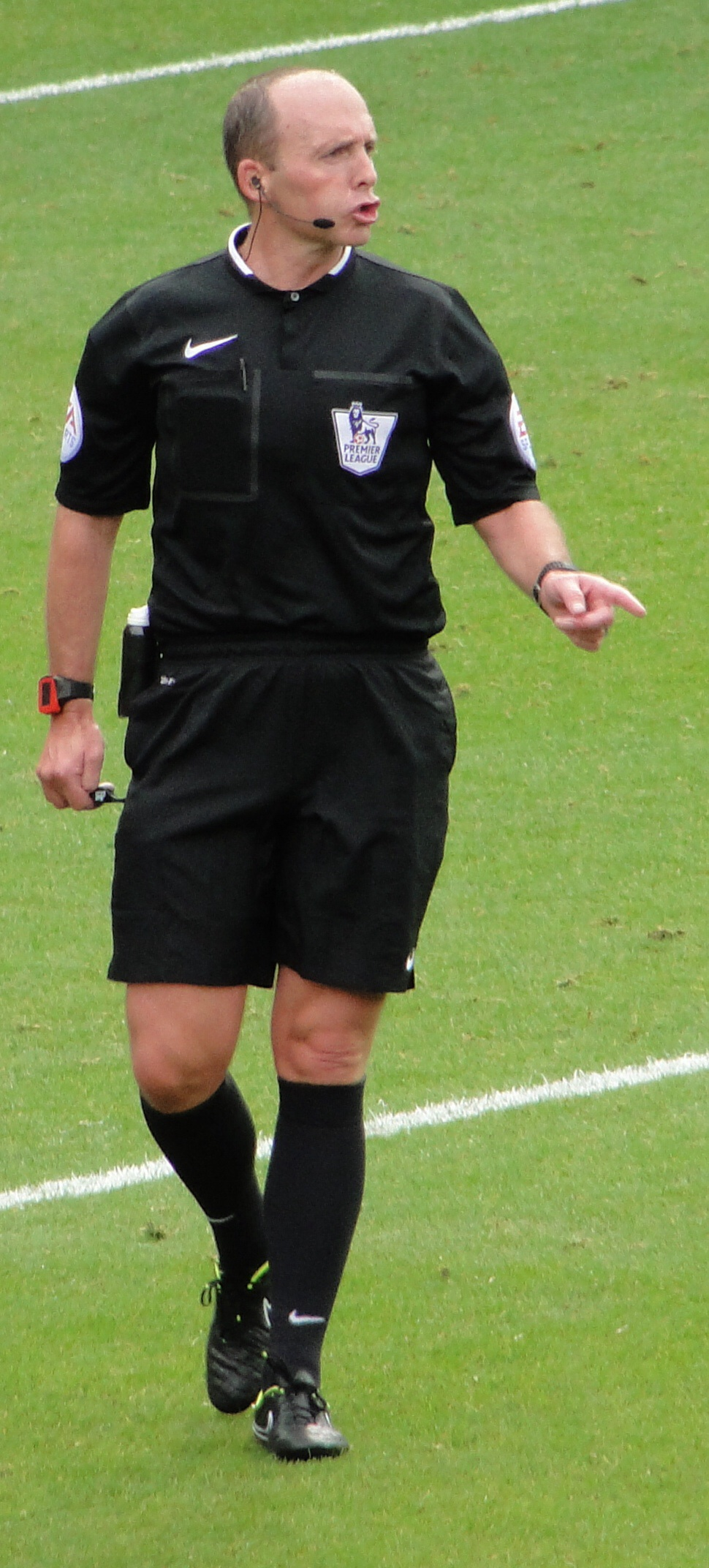
Mike Dean (pictured in 2014) was a controversial selection as match referee.

=== Background ===
This was Burnley's first Championship play-off final, although they had won the third-tier 1994 Football League Second Division play-off final 2–1 against Stockport County the old Wembley Stadium. Sheffield United had lost both the 1997 and 2003 Football League Second Division play-off finals. During the regular season, Burnley had won both matches, 3–2 away in December 2008 and 1–0 at home the following April. It had been 33 years since Burnley last played top-flight football in the 1975–76 Football League First Division, while Sheffield United had been most recently relegated from the highest tier in the 2006–07 FA Premier League. Paterson was Burnley's top scorer with twelve goals in the regular season, followed by Alexander with nine, while Craig Beattie led the scoring charts for Sheffield United with twelve. This was Burnley's 61st competitive match of their season, and Paterson was ever present throughout.

The referee for the final was Mike Dean of the Wirral District Football Association, with assistant referees Darren Cann and Mick McDonough, and Lee Probert acting as the fourth official. Dean's appointment was not without controversy: he had officiated the match in which Sheffield United were relegated from Premier League in 2007 and refereed the 2006 Football League Championship play-off final when Kevin Blackwell, the Sheffield United manager, was in charge at Leeds United who lost the match 3–0. Blackwell described the appointment as "inexplicable" and that he was "amazed at the stupidity of it." He went on to say that he was "very, very angry about people who run the game not using their common sense and putting Mike Dean in what could be a very embarrassing position". Both managers had appeared at the old Wembley Stadium as players: Owen Coyle played, and scored, in Bolton Wanderers' 4–3 victory over Reading in the 1995 Football League First Division play-off final while Blackwell featured for Boston United who lost against Wealdstone in the 1985 FA Trophy Final.

Both managers named starting line-ups unchanged from the second legs of their semi-finals. Burnley were playing in their away kit of light blue, while Sheffield United wore their traditional home strip of red and white stripes. Before kick-off, both teams were presented to members of the military and former Conservative Member of Parliament and Football League chairman Brian Mawhinney.

=== First half ===
Sheffield United kicked the game off around 3 p.m. in sunny conditions front of a Wembley crowd of 80,518. After early pressure, United's Kyle Walker struck the first shot on target from 20 yards (18 m) which was saved by Burnley's goalkeeper Brian Jensen. Five minutes later, Blake's weak shot was easily saved by Paddy Kenny in the Sheffield United goal. Two minutes later, a Matthew Kilgallon free kick was blocked by the Burnley wall but not cleared, allowing Howard to shoot from the edge of the penalty area which was saved by Jensen. On 13 minutes, Wade Elliott took the ball around the halfway line and started a run towards the Sheffield United goal. He passed to Chris McCann who was tackled, but the ball fell to Elliott whose first-time strike from 25 yards (23 m) flew into the top-left corner of Kenny's net, making the score 1–0 to Burnley. Two minutes later, Alexander brought down Howard as he ran into the box, but the appeals of the Sheffield United players for a penalty were dismissed by Dean. In the 19th minute, McCann headed over the bar from inside the six-yard box while Howard's free kick two minutes later was too high. The first yellow card of the game was shown to Burnley's Clarke Carlisle after he fouled Halford. Burnley were forced to make the first substitution of the afternoon on 27 minutes after McCann failed to recover from a knee injury he sustained clearing the ball, with Joey Guðjónsson coming on to replace him. Paterson went close on 31 minutes, curling the ball just wide of Kenny's post from 20 yards (18 m). Heading towards half time, the game became patchy with neither side creating clear-cut chances, but on 45 minutes, Thompson's looping header went wide. Three minutes of additional time were played and the half ended 1–0 to Burnley.

=== Second half ===
Burnley kicked off the second half and three minutes in, they were awarded a corner which Michael Duff toe-poked just wide of the post. Stephen Quinn's run was brought to a halt by an Alexander tackle before Guðjónsson's tap-in attempt was cleared by United's Nick Montgomery. In the 58th minute, Sheffield United made their first substitution of the game, with David Cotterill being replaced by Jamie Ward. Eight minutes later, Walker played Thompson onside, who picked out Blake. A last-second tackle from Walker did enough to distract Blake whose shot from 8 yards (7.3 m) went wide. United appealed for another penalty in the 69th minute when Walker was seemingly brought down by Christian Kalvenes, but it was not awarded. A minute later, Burnley made their second substitution with Blake, suffering from a hamstring injury, being replaced by Chris Eagles. In the 72nd minute, a break from Ward allowed him to shoot from a tight angle but Jensen deflected the strike. Burnley's final substitution was made in the 74th minute with Jay Rodriguez coming on for Thompson. A minute later, Ward was booked after a deliberate handball. On 77 minutes, an Eagles pass found Paterson on the wing who cut inside to shoot, but it was blocked by Kyle Naughton. Ward was shown a second yellow card for another intentional handball in the 79th minute. Arturo Lupoli was then brought on by Sheffield United to replace Howard, before Quinn was substituted by Lee Hendrie on 85 minutes. In the last minute of regular time, Morgan and Kalvenes clashed heads and the latter was booked. The resulting free kick was struck into the wall allowing Burnley to break but they failed to score as Montgomery cleared a poor pass from Paterson. Deep into additional time, Lupoli was booked for a foul on Elliott, and the final whistle was blown, with Burnley winning the match 1–0.

=== Details ===
25 May 2009
15:00

Burnley	1–0	Sheffield United
Elliott 13'	Report

Wembley Stadium, London
Attendance: 80,518
Referee: Mike Dean (Wirral)

Burnley	Sheffield United

GK	12	Brian Jensen
RB	4	Michael Duff
CB	5	Clarke Carlisle	(yellow card) 23'
CB	6	Steven Caldwell
LB	3	Christian Kalvenes	(yellow card) 90'
RM	11	Wade Elliott
CM	2	Graham Alexander
CM	16	Chris McCann		(substituted off) 27'
LM	20	Robbie Blake		(substituted off) 69'
CF	30	Steven Thompson		(substituted off) 74'
CF	10	Martin Paterson
Substitutes:
GK	1	Diego Penny
MF	7	Kevin McDonald
MF	8	Joey Guðjónsson	(substituted on) 27'
MF	33	Chris Eagles	(substituted on) 69'
FW	19	Jay Rodriguez	(substituted on) 74'
Manager:
Owen Coyle

GK	1	Paddy Kenny
RB	34	Kyle Walker
CB	5	Chris Morgan
CB	6	Matthew Kilgallon
LB	30	Kyle Naughton
DM	17	Nick Montgomery
RM	4	David Cotterill		(substituted off) 58'
CM	20	Brian Howard		(substituted off) 82'
CM	28	Stephen Quinn		(substituted off) 85'
LM	2	Greg Halford
CF	19	Craig Beattie
Substitutes:
GK	13	Ian Bennett
DF	32	Leigh Bromby
MF	11	Lee Hendrie		(substituted on) 85'	Red card
FW	9	Arturo Lupoli	(yellow card) 90+5'	(substituted on) 82'
FW	18	Jamie Ward	(yellow card) 75' (yellow-red card) 79'	(substituted on) 58'
Manager:
Kevin Blackwell

Match rules:

- 90 minutes.
- 30 minutes of extra time if necessary.
- Penalty shoot-out if scores still level.
- Five named substitutes.
- Maximum of three substitutions.

=== Statistics ===
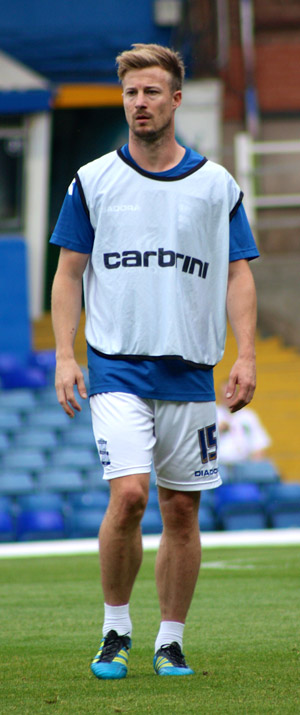
Wade Elliott (pictured in 2012) scored the only goal of the game.

Statistics
	Burnley	Sheffield United
Total shots	11	11
Shots on target	5	9
Ball possession	44%	56%
Corner kicks	9	3
Fouls committed	12	12
Offsides	1	1
Yellow cards	2	5
Red cards	0	2

== Post-match ==
Hendrie was shown a straight red card by the referee after the match ended for foul and abusive language. The Burnley manager Owen Coyle remarked "the players were magnificent. It was a great game, end-to-end. Sheffield United were brave and were coming at us even after they went down to 10 men. There's now a great adventure to look forward to. Regarding bringing in players, everybody knows our revenue. We may not have quantity but we have quality." His chairman Barry Kilby stated: "After 33 years out of the top flight, we're back. Half the population of the town were here today, and this is for them. Owen Coyle has done a fantastic, superb job on a small budget, and I'm sure he's looking forward to pitting his wits against the Premier League managers next season". The Sheffield United manager Kevin Blackwell noted "It doesn't get any easier to take, but we have to take it on chin and move forward. But I gave my congratulations to Owen Coyle. I'm going to go home and think of what to do now."

Burnley ended the next season in 18th place in the Premier League, five points from safety and relegated back to the Championship for the 2010–11 season. Sheffield United finished the following season in 8th place, five points outside the play-offs.

== See also ==
- 2009 Football League One play-off final
- 2009 Football League Two play-off final
- 2009 Conference Premier play-off final
