= Diego León (footballer, born 1984) =

Spanish footballer (born 1984)

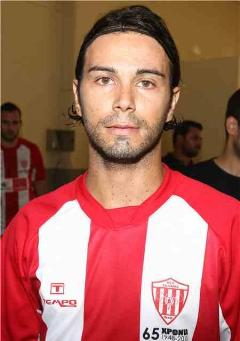
- León with Nea Salamina in 2013

Personal information
- Full name: Diego León Ayarza
- Date of birth: 16 January 1984 (age 42)
- Place of birth: Palencia, Spain
- Height: 1.70 m (5 ft 7 in)
- Position: Midfielder

Youth career
- 2001–2003: Real Madrid

Senior career*
Years	Team	Apps	(Gls)
2002–2004	Real Madrid B	10	(0)
2004–2006	Real Madrid	0	(0)
2005–2006	→ Arminia Bielefeld II (loan)	18	(7)
2005	→ Arminia Bielefeld (loan)	14	(1)
2006–2007	Grasshoppers	30	(3)
2007	Grasshoppers II	8	(8)
2008–2009	Barnsley	37	(2)
2009–2010	Las Palmas	22	(1)
2010–2011	Wacker Burghausen	11	(0)
2011–2012	Nea Salamina	17	(1)
2012–2013	Kerkyra	26	(0)
2013–2015	Nea Salamina	57	(12)
2015	Olympiacos Volos	5	(1)
2015–2016	Doxa	15	(1)
2016–2017	Al-Mesaimeer		

International career
2000–2001	Spain U16	16	(6)
2001	Spain U17	4	(0)
Medal record
Men's Football
Representing Spain
UEFA European Under-16 Championship
Winner	2001 England
- * Club domestic league appearances and goals as of 00:00, 9 May 2016 (UTC)

Diego León Ayarza (born 16 January 1984) is a Spanish former footballer who played as a midfielder.

== Club career ==
=== Real Madrid / Grasshoppers ===
León was born in Palencia, Castile and León. A youth product of Real Madrid, León could never appear for more than its B-team. He was initially given a number with the main squad for the 2004–05 season, but moved to Arminia Bielefeld in Germany (first on loan) in January 2005 before he could make his official debut for the Spanish giants.

León stayed at Arminia until the end of the 2005–06 campaign, after which he joined Grasshopper Club Zürich in the Swiss Super League.

=== Barnsley ===
On 21 December 2007, it was announced that León had signed a pre-contract agreement with Barnsley, with the transfer due to go through at the opening of the transfer window. The Yorkshire club had hoped to make the move official in time for him to play in the FA Cup third-round tie against Blackpool on 5 January 2008, but had to wait until the 9th: he made his first appearance that evening, playing in a reserve team match against Sheffield United.

León put in a great performance to earn himself his first match ball as a Barnsley player, with a Man of the match award against Colchester United on 29 January 2008. He went on to play in the memorable away victory over Premier League's Liverpool in the FA Cup, and also played a key role in the Reds 3–0 win at Watford on 9 April, being involved in all three goals, including a sumptuous flick for Jon Macken to square to Kayode Odejayi to score: his corner allowed Stephen Foster to head home and his throughball enabled Odejayi to score his second.

In the following game against Preston North End, León netted a key goal in Barnsley's Championship survival in the 2007–08 campaign, scoring from a 35-yard free kick for the 2–1 triumph. His second and final goal for the Tykes came in a 3–2 win over Burnley on 24 November 2008 and, on 7 May of the following year, he was told, along with Dennis Souza, Kyle Letheren and Marciano van Homoet he was free to look for a new club in the summer; shortly after he returned to his country, agreeing a deal with Segunda División side UD Las Palmas.

=== Later years ===
On 13 December 2010, León moved teams – and countries – again, signing with lowly SV Wacker Burghausen in Germany. In June of the following year, after a failed move to HNK Hajduk Split, he joined Nea Salamis Famagusta FC in Cyprus.

== Club statistics ==
As of 17 May 2015

Appearances and goals by club, season and competition
Club	Season	League			Cup		Continental		Total	
Club	Season	Division	Apps	Goals	Apps	Goals	Apps	Goals	Apps	Goals
Real Madrid B	2002–03	Segunda División B	9	0	0	0	0	0	9	0
Real Madrid B	2003–04	Segunda División B	1	0	0	0	0	0	1	0
Real Madrid B	Total		10	0	0	0	0	0	10	0
Real Madrid	2004–05	La Liga	0	0	0	0	0	0	0	0
Real Madrid	Total		0	0	0	0	0	0	0	0
Arminia Bielefeld	2004–05	Bundesliga	10	0	2	0	0	0	12	0
Arminia Bielefeld	2005–06	Bundesliga	4	1	1	0	0	0	5	1
Arminia Bielefeld	Total		14	1	3	0	0	0	17	1
Grasshoppers	2006–07	Swiss Super League	26	3	3	2	8	1	37	6
Grasshoppers	2007–08	Swiss Super League	4	0	0	0	0	0	4	0
Grasshoppers	Total		30	3	3	2	8	1	41	6
Barnsley	2007–08	Championship	18	1	2	0	0	0	20	1
Barnsley	2008–09	Championship	19	1	2	0	0	0	21	1
Barnsley	Total		37	2	4	0	0	0	41	2
Las Palmas	2009–10	Segunda División	22	1	0	0	0	0	22	1
Las Palmas	Total		22	1	0	0	0	0	22	1
Wacker Burghausen	2010–11	3. Liga	11	0	0	0	0	0	11	0
Wacker Burghausen	Total		11	0	0	0	0	0	11	0
Nea Salamina	2011–12	Cypriot First Division	17	1	0	0	0	0	17	1
Nea Salamina	Total		17	1	0	0	0	0	17	1
Kerkyra	2012–13	Super League Greece	26	0	2	0	0	0	28	0
Kerkyra	Total		26	0	2	0	0	0	28	0
Nea Salamina	2013–14	Cypriot First Division	31	8	1	0	0	0	32	8
Nea Salamina	2014–15	Cypriot First Division	26	4	2	0	0	0	28	4
Nea Salamina	Total		57	12	3	0	0	0	60	12
Career total			217	19	15	2	8	1	240	22

== Honours ==
Spain U16

- UEFA European Under-16 Championship: 2001
