= Mounir El Haimour =

French footballer (born 1980)

Personal information
- Date of birth: 29 October 1980 (age 46)
- Place of birth: Limoges, France
- Height: 1.75 m (5 ft 9 in)
- Position: Left winger

Senior career*
Years	Team	Apps	(Gls)
2000–2002	Châtellerault	40	(3)
2002–2003	Champagne Sport	22	(12)
2003–2006	Yverdon-Sport	71	(5)
2004	→ Alania Vladikavkaz (loan)	9	(0)
2006–2007	Schaffhausen	26	(1)
2007–2008	Neuchâtel Xamax	31	(0)
2008–2010	Barnsley	18	(0)
2012–2013	Stade Poitevin	25	(1)
2013–2019	Chauvigny		
2019–2021	UES Montmorillon		
2021–2023	Châtellerault	26	(1)
- * Club domestic league appearances and goals

Mounir El Haimour (born 29 October 1980) is a French former football player of Moroccan origin who played as a winger.

== Career ==
He signed for Barnsley on 27 June 2008 from Neuchâtel Xamax.
