= Kim Christensen (footballer, born 1980) =

Danish footballer and manager (born 1980)

Personal information
- Date of birth: 8 May 1980 (age 46)
- Place of birth: Frederiksværk, Denmark
- Height: 1.91 m (6 ft 3 in)
- Position: Striker

Team information
- Current team: Frederiksværk FK (Manager)

Senior career*
| Years | Team | Apps | (Gls) |
| 1998–2001 | Lyngby BK | 70 | (18) |
| 2001–2003 | Hamburger SV | 12 | (1) |
| 2003–2005 | FC Twente | 53 | (10) |
| 2005–2006 | Brøndby IF | 19 | (3) |
| 2006–2007 | Odense Boldklub | 26 | (5) |
| 2007–2008 | Barnsley | 11 | (1) |
| 2008–2009 | FC Midtjylland | 18 | (2) |
| 2010–2011 | Akademisk Boldklub | 15 | (4) |
| 2011–2012 | HIK | | |
| 2012–2014 | Blovstrød IF | | |

International career
| 2000–2001 | Denmark U21 | 9 | (1) |

Managerial career
- 2012–2014: Blovstrød IF (player-coach)
- 2014–2015: HIK (assistant)
- 2015: Allerød FK (assistant)
- 2015–: Frederiksværk FK
- * Club domestic league appearances and goals

Kim Christensen (born 8 May 1980) is a Danish football coach and former professional player. He manages Frederiksværk FK.

Christensen scored a single goal in nine games for the Denmark under-21 national football team from 2000 to 2001.

== Career ==
=== Early career ===
Born in Frederiksværk, Christensen started his career with Danish club Lyngby BK. In December 2001, he moved abroad to play for German club Hamburger SV in a DKK 500,000 transfer deal. Christensen had a hard time forcing his way into the starting line-up and left the club to join Dutch club FC Twente in the summer 2003. At Twente, he was given playing time once more.

In July 2005, when his Twente contract ran out, Christensen moved back to Denmark on a free transfer to play for Brøndby IF. In the summer of 2006, following a single year at Brøndby, he moved to league rivals OB. In August 2007 he transferred to English club Barnsley.

On 23 June 2008, he once more returned to Denmark, signing a two-year contract with FC Midtjylland.

=== Barnsley ===
Christensen received international clearance and was able to make his debut against Colchester United. He was named as a substitute and was brought on in the 73rd minute. His shot was handled in the box and Brian Howard dispatched the penalty. He continued to come on as a substitute and scored his first goal in an away game at Charlton Athletic, an injury time equaliser earning his side a point.

=== Frederiksværk Fodbold Klub ===
After Kim ended his career on the pitch, he decided to join his local childhood club FFK as a coach. He has had much success in Serie 2, the ninth tier of league football in Denmark.

== Honours ==
OB

- Danish Cup: 2006–07
