= István Ferenczi =

Hungarian footballer

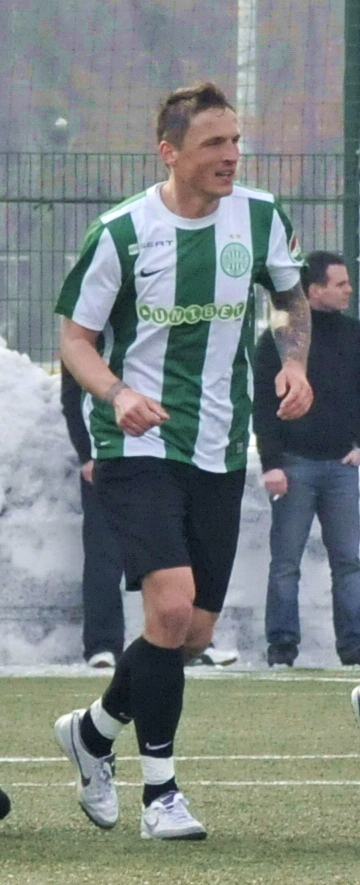

Personal information
- Date of birth: 14 September 1977 (age 49)
- Place of birth: Győr, Hungary
- Height: 6 ft 3 in (1.91 m)
- Position: Forward

Senior career*
Years	Team	Apps	(Gls)
1995–1998	Győri ETO FC	34	(5)
1998–1999	Zalaegerszegi TE	24	(8)
2000	Győri ETO FC	14	(3)
2000–2002	MTK Hungária FC	64	(25)
2002	→ Levski Sofia (loan)	4	(3)
2003–2004	VfL Osnabrück	5	(1)
2004	Vasas SC	15	(8)
2005	Çaykur Rizespor	15	(4)
2005–2006	Debreceni VSC	11	(5)
2006	Zalaegerszegi TE	17	(5)
2007–2008	Barnsley FC	53	(11)
2008–2010	Ferencvárosi TC	53	(47)
2010–2011	Vasas SC	39	(19)
2011–2012	Lombard-Pápa TFC	16	(4)
2012–2013	Gyirmót SE	13	(7)
2013–2014	Veľký Meder	4	(0)
2014–2019	Vasas SC	48	(28)
2020	Siófok	2	(0)

International career
1996–1997	Hungary U-19	6	(1)
1996–2000	Hungary U-21	11	(7)
2001–2008	Hungary	9	(2)

Managerial career
- 2015–2018: Vasas (fitness coach)
- 2018: Vasas (caretaker)
- 2018-2019: Vasas (assistant manager)
- 2020: Haladás (fitness coach)
- 2020-2021: Siófok (fitness coach)
- 2021-2022: Zalaegerszeg (assistant manager)
- 2022-2023: Paks (assistant manager)
- 2023-: Vasas (fitness coach)
- * Club domestic league appearances and goals

István Ferenczi (born 14 September 1977) is a Hungarian former professional footballer who played as a forward. He gained nine caps for the Hungary national team between 2001 and 2008 and scored two goals. The last club he played for in the top flight of Hungarian football was Vasas SC. He was over 40 when he played his last first league game, and played two more professional games at the age of 43 for BFC Siófok in Nemzeti Bajnokság II, the second tier of Hungarian football. He is a 6 ft 3 in (1.91 m) target man standing. He has scored goals in a number of countries including England, Turkey, Germany and his native Hungary.

== Barnsley career ==
=== 2006–2007 ===
Ferenczi signed for Barnsley on 31 January 2007 – the transfer deadline day and incidentally the same week Barnsley captured fellow Hungarian Péter Rajczi. He made his Barnsley debut against Cardiff City on 2 February 2007 from the bench. Ferenczi scored his first goal in the game at Southampton when he headed home a Martin Devaney cross. In the following fixture against Hull City, Ferenczi scored a brace, the first he slid under the keeper after a defensive error and the second a bullet header from a Brian Howard cross. Ferenczi carried on his scoring record as he scored a goal supplied by Péter Rajczi and beat Stoke City on 26 February 2007.

He added his fifth goal in four starts on 3 March, after heading in a Martin Devaney cross in a 3–1 loss at Oakwell against Norwich City. He failed to hit the target against Sunderland the following Saturday as Barnsley lost 2–0, but scored a last minute clincher against Plymouth Argyle on 14 March in a 4–2 away win.

=== 2007–2008 ===
Ferenczi started the first game of the season against Coventry City. Three days later in the Carling Cup he got off the mark for the season after coming off the bench by heading home Rob Kozluk's cross.

He got off the mark in the League on 25 August in Barnsley's home game with Plymouth when he swept home Kayode Odejayi's low cross.

He suffered an ankle injury against Cardiff at Oakwell and missed five weeks, but he returned with a bang with new strike partner Jon Macken and scored two goals in as many games against Preston and Blackpool, both headers from Brian Howard free kicks. He also played in the memorable victories over Premier League sides Liverpool and Chelsea in the 2007–08 FA Cup.

In May 2008, Simon Davey transfer-listed Ferenczi (despite his desire to stay) along with four other players. Following initial interest from Nottingham Forest and an unnamed Swedish club, he signed a two-year contract for Ferencváros on 24 July 2008.

== International career ==
Ferenczi made nine appearances for the Hungary national team between 2001 and 2008, scoring two goals.

== Career statistics ==
Scores and results list Hungary's goal tally first, score column indicates score after each Ferenczi goal.

List of international goals scored by István Ferenczi
No.	Date	Venue	Opponent	Score	Result	Competition
1	14 November 2001	Budapest, Hungary	North Macedonia		5–0	Friendly
2	18 December 2005	Miami, United States	Antigua and Barbuda		3–0	Friendly

== Honours ==
Levski Sofia

- Bulgarian A PFG: 2001–02

Debreceni VSC

- Nemzeti Bajnokság I: 2005–06
- Szuperkupa: 2006

Ferencváros

- Nemzeti Bajnokság II (Eastern Group): 2008–09

Individual

- Nemzeti Bajnokság II top scorer: 2008–09 with 39 goals
