= Brian Howard (English footballer) =

English footballer

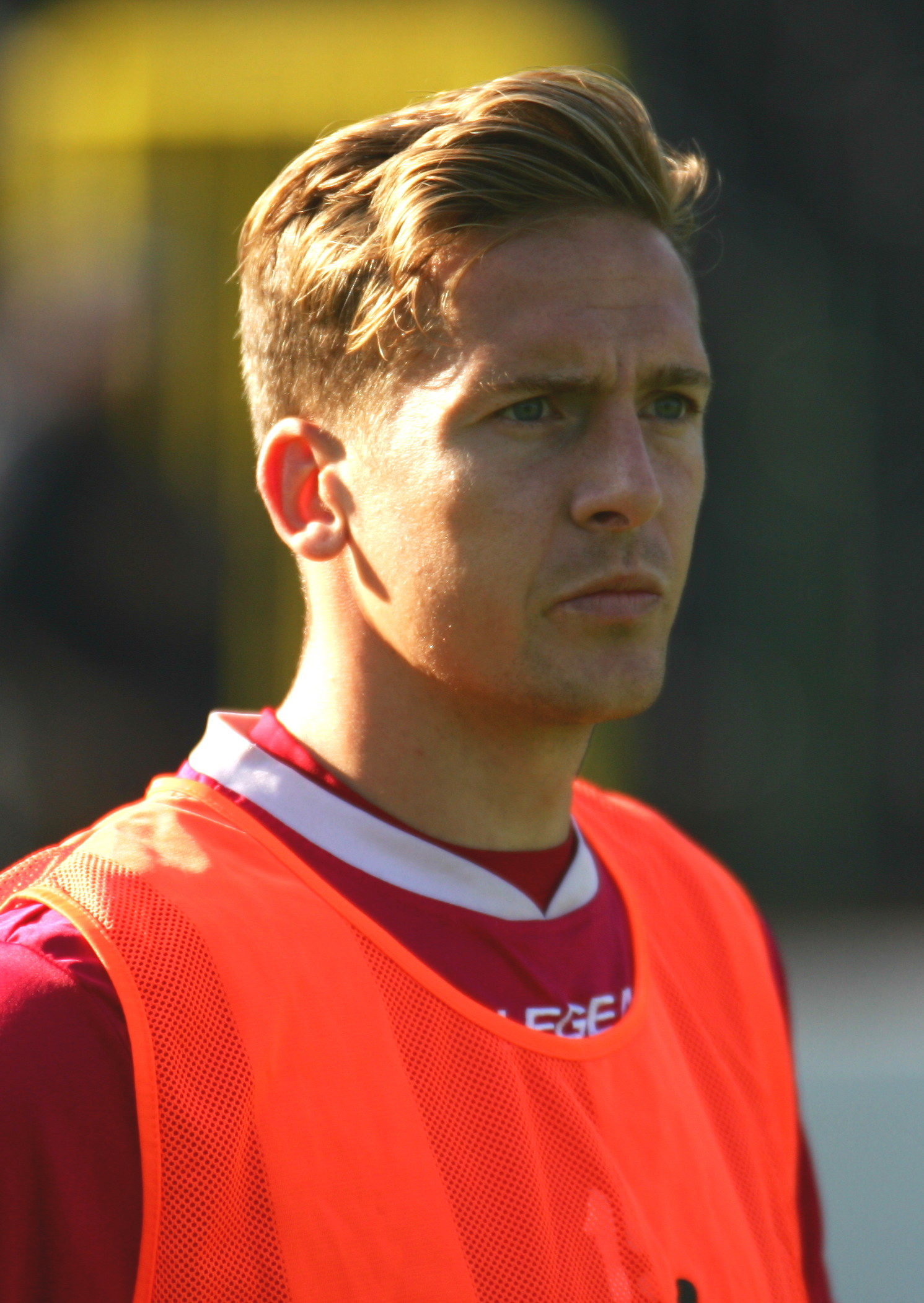
- In PFC CSKA Sofia colours, 2013

Personal information
- Full name: Brian Richard William Brotherton Howard
- Date of birth: 23 January 1983 (age 43)
- Place of birth: Winchester, England
- Height: 5 ft 8 in (1.73 m)
- Position: Midfielder

Youth career
- 1999–2000: Southampton

Senior career*
Years	Team	Apps	(Gls)
2000–2003	Southampton	0	(0)
2003–2005	Swindon Town	70	(9)
2005–2009	Barnsley	121	(27)
2008–2009	→ Sheffield United (loan)	15	(1)
2009	Sheffield United	15	(1)
2009–2012	Reading	59	(2)
2011	→ Millwall (loan)	12	(0)
2012–2013	Portsmouth	23	(0)
2013	Bristol City	6	(0)
2013	CSKA Sofia	11	(0)
2014	Birmingham City	5	(1)
2014	Oxford United	7	(0)
2015	Eastleigh	18	(0)
2015–2016	Alresford Town	15	(4)
2016–2017	Romsey Town	11	(0)
2017	Whitehawk	4	(0)
Total		392	(45)

International career
1999–2000	England U16	4	(0)
2000–2001	England U17	4	(0)
2001	England U19	1	(0)
2003	England U20	7	(0)
- * Club domestic league appearances and goals

Brian Richard William Brotherton Howard (born 23 January 1983) is an English footballer who last played as a midfielder for Whitehawk. He made more than 300 appearances in the Football League, and also played for Bulgarian club CSKA Sofia. Internationally, he represented England from under-16 to under-20 level.

== Club career ==
=== Southampton ===
Howard started his career as a trainee with Eastleigh until moving to Premier League club Southampton in July 1999. However, his progress at the club suffered a setback when he suffered injuries on two separate occasions in the 1999–00 season. Despite this, Howard was seventeen years old when he signed his first professional contract with Southampton.

In April 2001, Howard spent two months at Australian semi-professional soccer club Joondalup United alongside Gary McManus and played two matches before returning to his parent club, citing "the standard of football was not high enough". At the end of the 2002–03 season, he was released by the club, without making a first-team appearance.

=== Swindon Town ===
Howard trained with Chelsea, who offered him a contract, but while he was away with the England under-20 team, the club was taken over by Roman Abramovich and several top players were signed. Howard chose to turn down Chelsea's offer, preferring the prospect of playing regularly in a lower division, and signed a one-year deal with Division Two (third-tier) club Swindon Town.

He made his debut for the club, as well as the Football League, in a 3–2 home defeat against Sheffield Wednesday on 9 August 2003. However, Howard initially found his playing time, coming from the substitute bench. He scored his first Swindon Town goal on 1 October 2003, an 89th-minute equaliser against Luton Town, resulting in a 2–2 draw. Two months later on 20 December 2003, Howard scored his second goal for the club, in a 2–0 win against Brentford. As the season progressed, he soon earned his way to the starting eleven, playing in the midfield position. In early–2004, Howard added two more goals for Swindon Town, adding his tally to scoring four goals in his first season at the club. His performance led the club to offer him a two–year contract. He helped Swindon Town finish fifth place to earn a place in the Division Two playoffs, but the club lost to Brighton & Hove Albion in the play-off semifinals. In his first season at Swindon Town, Howard made forty–one appearances and scoring four times in all competitions.

Howard's contract with Swindon Town was extended for a further year ahead of the 2004–05 season. He scored his first goal of the season, which turned out to be a winning goal, in a 2–1 win against Milton Keynes Dons on 14 August 2004. Two weeks later on 30 August 2004, he scored his second goal of the season, scoring from a header, in a 3–2 loss against Walsall. Howard scored two goals in two matches between 27 October 2004 and 30 October 2004 against Sheffield Wednesday and Torquay United. Since the start of the 2004–05 season, he began to be used in a more central role in midfield rather than on the wing, a change which pleased the player. Howard also appeared in every matches for the club until he missed one match, due to picking up five yellow cards. After serving a one match suspension, Howard scored on his return, in a 3–0 win against Brentford on 28 December 2004. However by January, his form began to dipped and found himself out of the starting eleven for Swindon Town. He also faced his own injury concerns, suffering a broken bone in his foot that saw him out for the rest of the 2004–05 season. In his second season at the club, Howard made forty–two appearances and scoring six times in all competitions.

However, Budget restrictions meant manager Andy King chose not to offer Howard a new contract; he expressed his disappointment that a team with potential was being broken up because of finance.

=== Barnsley ===
Howard had talks with AFC Bournemouth, but signed a two-year contract with fellow League One club Barnsley instead. He said about the move: "Even if Swindon had come back to me saying they had the money to match Barnsley's offer I don't think I would have stayed. I'm just not sure what the future would have held at the club."

However, Howard missed the first two months of the season with a broken bone in the foot. On 27 September 2005, he made his debut for the club, coming on as a 51st minute substitute, in a 3–0 loss against Bristol City. Two weeks later on 15 October 2005, Howard scored his first Barnsley goal, scoring an equaliser in the 84th minute, in a 2–2 draw against Blackpool. After this, Howard became an important member of the promotion-winning team alongside Stephen McPhail in midfield. The pair played in all three play-off games, and Daniel Nardiello's equalising free kick, that took the final against Swansea City into extra time, resulted from a foul on Howard.

In March 2007, Howard was one of three Barnsley players released without charge following arrest in connection with an alleged racially motivated assault. He was named Barnsley's player of the year for the 2006–07 season, as the team successfully avoided relegation, and signed a new two-year contract.

Having acted as captain of Barnsley during much of the 2007–08 season when Paul Reid was out of the team, manager Simon Davey appointed Howard captain on a permanent basis in January 2008. He said it was a "massive honour" to captain a top-half Championship team, and appreciated the trust Davey and the club had in him. That season, Barnsley reached the semifinals of the FA Cup. In the fifth round, Howard scored a 93rd-minute winner to beat Liverpool 2–1 at Anfield. Barnsley eliminated Chelsea in the next round to progress to the semi-final, which they lost to Cardiff City. Howard was named in the PFA Championship Team of the Year.

After reported interest from clubs including Aston Villa, Middlesbrough, Everton, and Sheffield United, the club's owner, Patrick Cryne, suggested Howard was a better player than Sheffield United's Michael Tonge, and if Tonge were valued at £3 to £4 million, then Howard would be worth £10m. United manager Kevin Blackwell denied any interest in signing Howard, Davey confirmed no bid had been received from the club, and Sky Sports quoted Howard as saying: "I feel I have given great service to this club, and I would like them to recognise that by doing one of two things – either give me the contract I am worth or sell me. And by that, I mean doing me the courtesy of selling me at a realistic price."

=== Sheffield United ===
At the end of September, Howard was left out of Barnsley's squad ahead of an expected loan move to Sheffield United, completed on 2 October. He signed on loan until January 2009, with an option to purchase at that time. He made his debut a couple of days later, appearing as a second-half substitute in a 3–0 home victory over Bristol City.

Howard played regularly in the Blades midfield from that point but had to wait until 9 December before he scored his first goal, netting the winner in a 1–0 away win over Nottingham Forest. He joined United permanently on 7 January 2009. He contributed to the club reaching the play-offs, and scored in the semi-final against Preston North End, but was "largely anonymous" in the final as United lost 1–0 to Burnley.

=== Reading ===
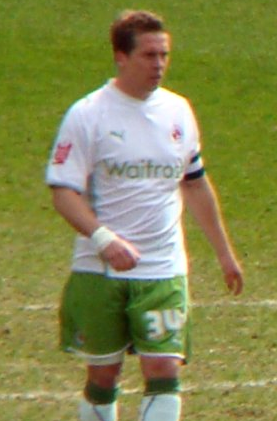
Howard playing for Reading in 2010].

Howard began the 2009–10 season in Sheffield United's starting eleven, but on 2 September 2009, he signed for Championship rivals Reading on a three-year contract for a fee of £500,000; James Harper went the other way on loan.

He scored his first goal for the club on 20 October against Queens Park Rangers, a late consolation with Reading already 4–0 down. During the match against Derby County on 28 November, Howard suffered mild concussion and a fractured jaw in a clash of heads. He was out for several weeks recovering from surgery to insert metal plates in his jaw. In the FA Cup fifth round against West Bromwich Albion, Howard volleyed over the goalkeeper only to hit the crossbar before scoring a 94th-minute equaliser; Gylfi Sigurðsson's "brilliant curling winner" in extra time put Reading into the quarter-finals for the first time since 1927. He stood in as captain for four matches towards the end of the season while Matt Mills served a suspension.

Howard was sent off against Middlesbrough in September for a late tackle. In mid-March 2011, he was linked with a move back to Southampton. He remained at Reading, making 28 appearances over the season and contributed to their reaching the play-offs, but was an unused substitute in the semi-final second leg and the final, as Reading lost to Swansea City. He then stated that if Reading were unable to give him regular football, he would prefer to leave. Howard spent three months on loan at Championship club Millwall in the first half of the 2011–12 season. He said he expected to leave Reading in the January transfer window, but no move took place, and he was released when his contract expired in June 2012.

=== Portsmouth ===
After a pre-season trial with Portsmouth, who were rebuilding a squad after losing all their senior players because of the club's administration, Howard was one of ten players to sign a one-month contract on 16 August 2012. He was named captain. Howard scored his first goal in a Football League Trophy match at home to Bournemouth on 4 September, but was relieved of penalty-taking duties in October after missing twice in a week. In January, Howard was one of a number of players given a week's notice that their contracts would not be renewed, and they duly left the club.

=== Bristol City ===
On 15 February 2013, Howard signed a contract until the season's end with Bristol City, taking shirt number 11. His first appearance was as a substitute in the Severnside derby against Cardiff City the next day, and he made a further five appearances, all as a substitute, before being released at the end of the season.

=== CSKA Sofia ===
Howard signed a one-year contract with Bulgarian A Football Group club CSKA Sofia in August 2013.

He made his debut for the club, coming on as a 70th minute substitute, in a 0–0 draw against Botev Plovdiv on 1 September 2013. However, Howard had a difficult time settling in Bulgaria, revealing that he never received his salaries. Howard played 13 games, 11 in the League, before he returning to England during the mid-season break, having left CSKA Sofia in December 2013.

=== Birmingham City ===
Howard joined yet another Championship club, Birmingham City, in January 2014 until the end of the season. After making his debut in a 2–0 defeat at home to Yeovil Town, Howard's first goal for Birmingham, a 48th-minute flicked header from Paul Caddis's cross, opened the scoring at home to Derby County on 1 February; the match finished 3–3. He suffered a broken toe and ankle problems, and after just three more appearances, he was released when his contract expired.

=== Oxford United ===
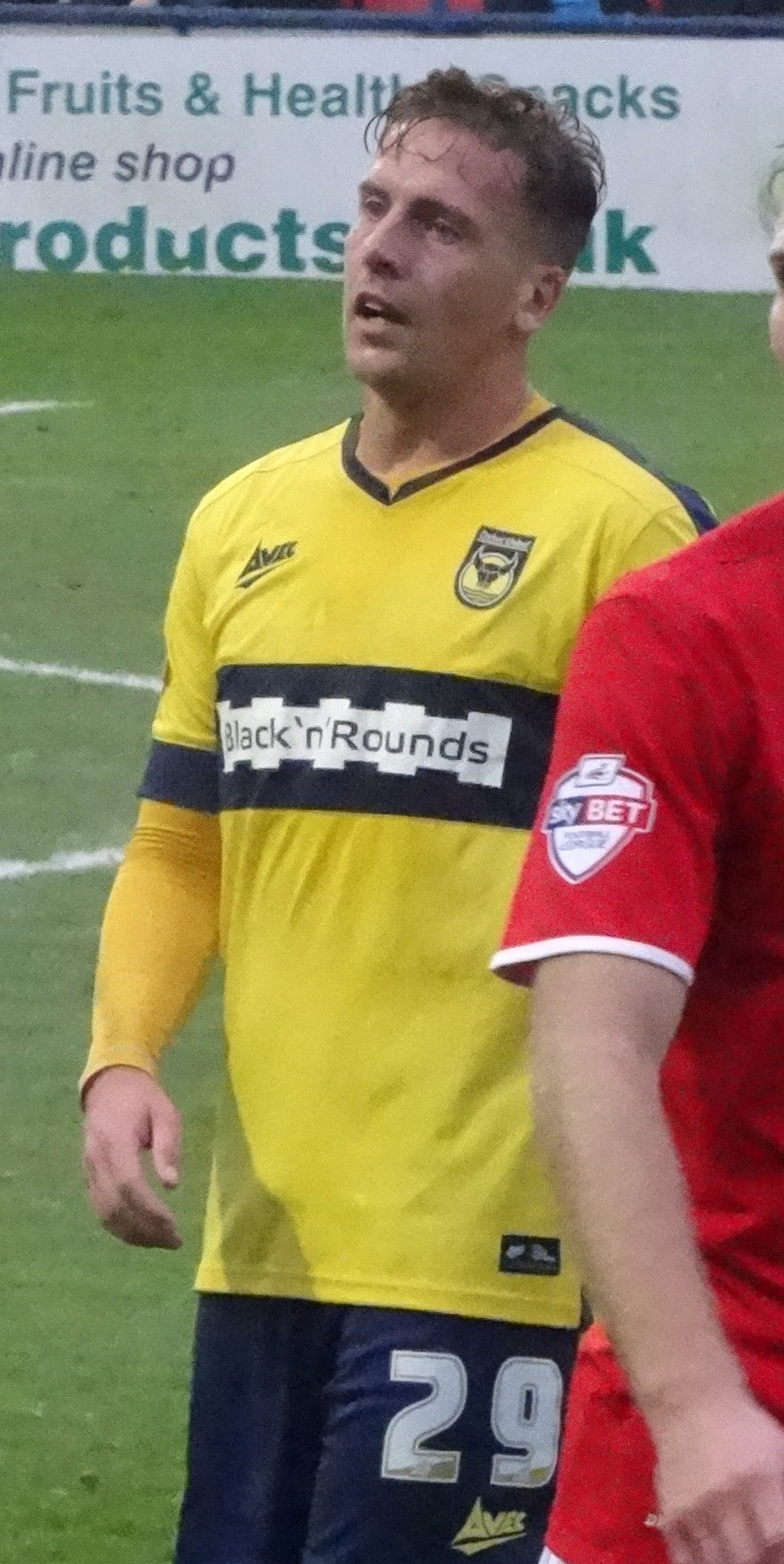
Howard playing for Oxford United in 2014 .

Howard joined Oxford United on 15 September 2014. His contract ran until January 2015 with the option of extending until the end of the season.

The next day, he made his debut for the club, starting a match and played 67 minutes before being substituted, and set up the opening goal of the game, in a 3–1 win against Accrington Stanley. However, Howard played only infrequently, due to injuries. As a result, he was released in December.

=== Eastleigh ===
In January 2015, Howard signed for Conference Premier club Eastleigh until the end of the season.

He made his debut for the club, coming on as a 62nd minute substitute, in a 2–0 loss against Altrincham two days later. Since joining Eastleigh, Howard became a first team for the side, playing in the midfield position. He helped the club qualify for the Football Conference play–offs, but Eastleigh lost 5–1 on aggregate in both legs against Grimsby Town. At the end of the 2014–15 season, Howard made eighteen appearances in all competitions. Following this, he was released by the club.

=== Later career ===
In September 2015, he joined Alresford Town, and by the end of the season had played 18 matches and scored 6 goals in all competitions, with 4 goals from 15 matches in the Wessex League.

He moved to Romsey Town for the start of the 2016–17 season before switching in January 2017 to Brighton-based National League South club Whitehawk. However after making four appearances for the club, Howard left Whitehawk a month later.

== International career ==
Howard played for England from under-16 to under-20 level. While playing for the England U16 side, he "scored direct from a corner" against Argentina U16. In November 2003, Howard chose to not represent the England U20 for the FIFA World Youth Championship in United Arab Emirates in favour of focus on Swindon Town.

Howard, whose father is from Glasgow, was called up by Scotland manager George Burley for their friendly match against Croatia on 26 March 2008; however he was deemed ineligible by FIFA as he had not registered his availability at a young enough age. Attempts to have the decision overturned proved fruitless.

== Career statistics ==
As of match played 4 February 2017

Club statistics
Club	Season	League			National Cup		League Cup		Other		Total	
Club	Season	Division	Apps	Goals	Apps	Goals	Apps	Goals	Apps	Goals	Apps	Goals
Swindon Town	2003–04	Second Division	35	4	1	0	2	0	3 (Note: One appearance in Football League Trophy; two appearances in Second Division play-offs)	0	41	4
Swindon Town	2004–05	League One	35	5	3	1	2	0	2 (Note: Appearance(s) in Football League Trophy)	0	42	6
Swindon Town	Total		70	9	4	1	4	0	5	0	83	10
Barnsley	2005–06	League One	31	5	3	0	0	0	4 (Note: One appearance in Football League Trophy; three appearances in League One play-offs)	0	38	5
Barnsley	2006–07	Championship	42	8	2	0	0	0	—		44	8
Barnsley	2007–08	Championship	41	13	5	1	1	0	—		47	14
Barnsley	2008–09	Championship	7	1	0	0	1	0	—		8	1
Barnsley	Total		121	27	10	1	2	0	4	0	137	28
Sheffield United (loan)	2008–09	Championship	15	1	—		—		—		15	1
Sheffield United	2008–09	Championship	11	1	3	0	—		3 (Note: Appearance(s) in Championship play-offs)	1	17	2
Sheffield United	2009–10	Championship	4	0	—		1	0	—		5	0
Sheffield United	Total		30	2	3	0	1	0	3	1	37	3
Reading	2009–10	Championship	34	2	5	1	—		—		39	3
Reading	2010–11	Championship	24	0	1	0	2	0	1	0	28	0
Reading	2011–12	Championship	1	0	0	0	1	0	—		2	0
Reading	Total		59	2	6	1	3	0	1	0	69	3
Millwall (loan)	2011–12	Championship	12	0	—		—		—		12	0
Portsmouth	2012–13	League One	23	0	1	0	0	0	2	1	26	1
Bristol City	2012–13	Championship	6	0	—		—		—		6	0
CSKA Sofia	2013–14	A Group	11	0	2	0	—		—		13	0
Birmingham City	2013–14	Championship	5	1	0	0	—		—		5	1
Oxford United	2014–15	League Two	7	0	1	0	—		—		8	0
Eastleigh	2014–15	Conference Premier	18	0	—		—		2 (Note: Appearance(s) in Conference Premier play-offs)	0	20	0
Alresford Town	2015–16	Wessex League Premier Division	15	4	0	0	—		3 (Note: Two appearances two goals in Wessex League Cup; one appearance in Aldershot Senior Cup)	2	18	6
Romsey Town	2016–17	Wessex League Division One	11	0	—		—		1 (Note: Appearance(s) in Hampshire FA Russell-Cotes Benevolent Cup)	1	12	1
Whitehawk	2016–17	National League South	4	0	—		—		0	0	4	0
Career total			392	45	27	3	10	0	21	5	450	53

== Honours ==
Barnsley

- Football League One play-offs: 2006

Individual

- Barnsley Player of the Year: 2006–07
- PFA Team of the Year: 2007–08 Championship
