= Dennis Souza =

Brazilian footballer (born 1980)

Dênis Souza
Personal information
- Full name: Dênis de Souza Guedes
- Date of birth: January 9, 1980 (age 46)
- Place of birth: São Paulo, Brazil
- Height: 6 ft 3 in (1.91 m)
- Position: Defender

Senior career*
Years	Team	Apps	(Gls)
2000	Matsubara	0	(0)
2000–2004	Roda JC	0	(0)
2000–2001	→ K.R.C. Harelbeke (loan)	39	(2)
2002–2003	→ Mons (loan)	25	(1)
2003–2004	→ Beringen-Heusden-Zolder (loan)	31	(0)
2004	Standard Liège	0	(0)
2004–2006	Mons	24	(1)
2006–2007	Charleroi	16	(2)
2007–2009	Barnsley	78	(2)
2009–2010	Al-Sailiya Sport Club	29	(4)
2010–2011	Doncaster Rovers	8	(0)
2011–2013	OFI	39	(3)
2013–2014	Apollon Smyrnis	1	(0)
2014–2016	Wiltz	48	(2)
Total		338	(17)
- * Club domestic league appearances and goals

Dennis Souza de Guedes, known as simply Dennis Souza (born 9 January 1980) is a former Brazilian footballer.

Souza was signed by Barnsley in August 2007 following a trial with the club. He quickly became a fixture a centre-back, and an instant favourite with the Oakwell fans. He scored two goals for Barnsley in the league, both against promotion challengers Bristol City. He also played in the memorable victories over Premier League sides Liverpool and Chelsea in the 2007-08 FA Cup.

On July 1, 2009, Souza signed for Qatari outfit Al-Sailiya Sports club on a two-year contract. After his contract was terminated, he joined Doncaster Rovers as a free agent on November 9, 2010. He was released from the club on May 20, 2011.

On 31 August 2011, he joined Super League Greece side OFI on a two-year contract. On 30 June 2013, after a quick negotiation, Souza decided not to renew his contract with Ofi Crete and is at the moment free agent.
