= Marciano Bruma =

Dutch footballer of Surinamese descent

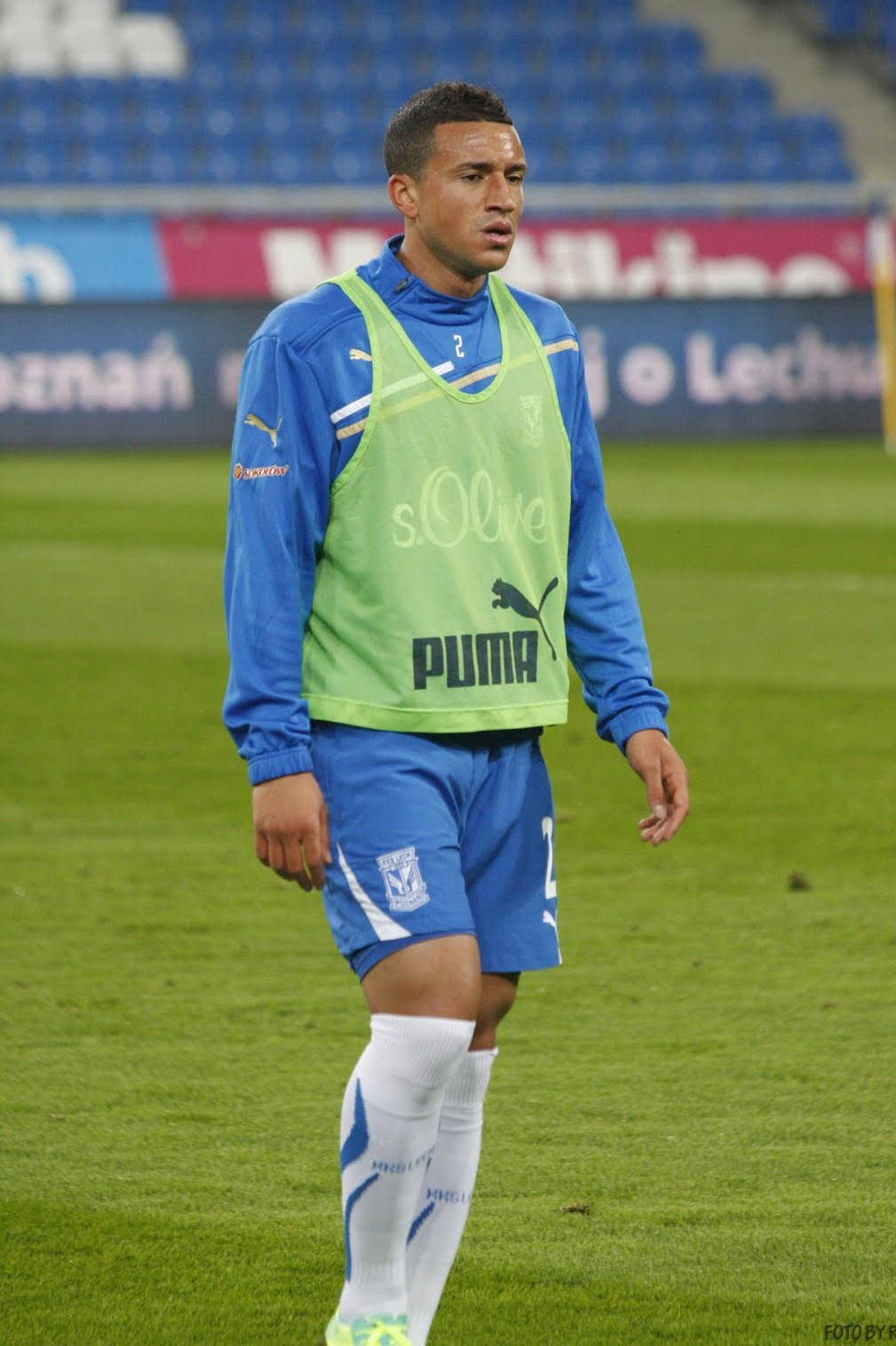
- Marciano Bruma in 2011

Personal information
- Full name: Marciano van Homoet Bruma
- Birth name: Marciano van Homoet
- Date of birth: 7 March 1984 (age 42)
- Place of birth: Rotterdam, Netherlands
- Height: 1.83 m (6 ft 0 in)
- Position: Defender

Youth career
- Feyenoord

Senior career*
Years	Team	Apps	(Gls)
2004–2007	Sparta	28	(1)
2007–2009	Barnsley	36	(0)
2009–2010	Willem II	18	(0)
2010–2011	Arka Gdynia	25	(0)
2011–2012	Lech Poznań	6	(0)
2012–2013	Rijnsburgse Boys	5	(0)
2014–2016	Excelsior Maassluis	16	(0)
2016–2018	XerxesDZB		
2018–2019	VV Hillegersberg		
2019–2020	Zwaluwen		
2020–2022	Zwarte Pijl		
- * Club domestic league appearances and goals

Marciano van Homoet Bruma (born Marciano van Homoet; 7 March 1984) is a Dutch retired footballer who played as a defender.

== Club career ==
=== Barnsley ===
Bruma was signed by Barnsley on 8 June 2007. He was originally known as Bruma, but was forced to change his name in September 2007, by the FA when Barnsley sent in his registration, after he completed a successful trial period with them at the start of the season. He suffered a broken hand during pre-season, and eventually made his debut for the club in a 1–0 defeat to Sheffield United on 15 December 2007.

During his first season at Oakwell, he played as a substitute in the memorable win over Premier League side Liverpool in the 2007-08 FA Cup. He then excelled in the subsequent quarter-final victory against Chelsea and also played at Wembley in the Semi-Final against Cardiff City.

=== Willem II ===
He was released in July 2009 when his contract expired. He then signed a deal with Dutch side Willem II, agreeing a one-year contract with an option for a further year.

=== Arka Gdynia ===
He signed a two-year contract with Polish club Arka Gdynia on 9 July 2010. He was released from Arka Gdynia on 30 June 2011.

=== Lech Poznań ===
On 18 August 2011 Bruma signed a one-year contract with Polish side Lech Poznań, only to leave them after one year for Dutch amateur side Rijnsburgse Boys.

He was snapped up by Excelsior Maassluis in summer 2014 and left them for Hoofdklasse club XerxesDZB in 2016. He later played with VV Hillegersberg, VV Zwaluwen, and joined Zwarte Pijl in summer 2020.

== Personal life ==
Marciano is the older brother of former VfL Wolfsburg player Jeffrey Bruma. He is of Surinamese descent.

He had always been known as Marciano Bruma in the Netherlands, after dropping his father's surname as a young child when his parents split up. But the FA insisted he should use the name on his birth certificate, so in England he played as Marciano van Homoet.

After retiring as a player, he became a personal trainer.
