= Rhys Meynell =

English footballer

Personal information
- Date of birth: 17 August 1988 (age 38)
- Place of birth: Barnsley, England
- Position: Defender

Team information
- Current team: Frickley Athletic

Youth career
- Barnsley

Senior career*
Years	Team	Apps	(Gls)
2005–2008	Barnsley	0	(0)
2007	→ Ossett Albion (loan)		
2008	→ Gretna (loan)	16	(1)
2008–2009	Stalybridge Celtic	39	(0)
2009	AFC Telford United	0	(0)
2009–2010	Chester City	x	(x)
2010	Galway United	32	(1)
2010–2012	Stalybridge Celtic	50	(2)
2012–2014	Guiseley		
2014–2015	Harrogate Town		
2015	→ Buxton (loan)		
2015–2016	Shaw Lane		
2016	Goole		
2016–2017	Frickley Athletic		
- * Club domestic league appearances and goals as of 18:15, 3 March 2012 (UTC)

Rhys Meynell (born 17 August 1988) is an English former professional footballer who is the assistant manager at Frickley Athletic.

== Career ==
Meynell started his career at Barnsley, where he move up from the club's academy to the reserves, which he captained on a number of occasions in the 2007/08 season.

He spent time on loan at non-league Ossett Albion in 2007, before joining Scottish Premier League side Gretna on loan for the second half of the 2007–08 season on 31 January 2008.

After being released by Barnsley he went on trial at Greenock Morton, Oxford United, Cheltenham Town and Barnet before signing with Conference North side Stalybridge Celtic on 8 August 2008. He made his first appearance for the club coming on as substitute against Tamworth on 12 August 2008.

It was announced he had signed for Telford United at the end of the season on 23 June 2009 but he quickly joined Chester City, having taken part in just one training session at Telford.

In February 2010, he was signed by Galway United a week before the beginning of the 2010 League of Ireland season. On 20 December 2010 he rejoined Stalybridge Celtic. His second debut for the club came on 1 January 2011 when he played the full match against Hyde.

In May 2012 he joined Guiseley as a defensive midfielder but with guiseley struggling with no left back after injury of Andy Mcwilliams he took the Left Back Role.in the 2013/14 season Mark Bower Signed ex Leeds left back Ben Parker, Meynell has coped with this healthy competition. After Guiseley released him at the end of the 2013/2014 season, he joined Harrogate on a free transfer.

In September 2016 he rejoined Frickley Athletic.

In August 2023 he joined Worsbrough Bridge Athletic as Assistant Manager.
