= Heinz Müller (footballer, born 1978) =

German footballer

Personal information
- Full name: Helmut Paul Heinz Müller
- Date of birth: 30 May 1978 (age 48)
- Place of birth: Frankfurt am Main, West Germany
- Height: 1.94 m (6 ft 4 in)
- Position: Goalkeeper

Youth career
- 1996–1997: FSV Frankfurt

Senior career*
| Years | Team | Apps | (Gls) |
| 1997–2001 | Hannover 96 | 9 | (0) |
| 2001–2002 | Arminia Bielefeld | 1 | (0) |
| 2002–2003 | FC St. Pauli | 16 | (0) |
| 2003–2004 | Jahn Regensburg | 4 | (0) |
| 2004–2005 | Odd Grenland | 7 | (0) |
| 2005–2007 | Lillestrøm | 42 | (0) |
| 2007–2009 | Barnsley | 64 | (0) |
| 2009–2014 | Mainz 05 | 65 | (0) |
| 2010–2014 | Mainz 05 II | 2 | (0) |
| Total | | 210 | (0) |
- * Club domestic league appearances and goals

Heinz Müller (born 30 May 1978) is a German former professional footballer who played as a goalkeeper.

== Club career ==
Müller started his first-team career with the German amateur club FSV Frankfurt in the summer of 1996 and went on to then Regionalliga Nord side Hannover 96 after one season.

He spent four seasons in Hannover as the second-choice keeper and made eight appearances in the 2. Bundesliga over three seasons following the club's promotion to the second division in 1998. He then transferred to Arminia Bielefeld in the summer of 2001, but only managed one 2. Bundesliga appearance in one and a half seasons with the club.

In January 2003, he moved to FC St. Pauli and was their first-choice keeper until the end of the 2002–03 season, appearing in sixteen 2. Bundesliga games. The club was relegated to the Regionalliga at the end of the season, and Müller moved on to then newly promoted 2. Bundesliga side Jahn Regensburg for the 2003–04 season, and made four 2. Bundesliga appearances for the club at the beginning of the season.

He transferred to Norwegian club Odd Grenland in the summer of 2004 and played there until the end of the year before moving to Lillestrøm in January 2005. In August 2007, Müller moved to Barnsley on a three-year contract and made a number of superb performances. In 64 appearances for Barnsley, Müller managed to keep 17 clean-sheets and conceded 88 goals. A highlight in his debut season was saving an Andy Keogh penalty in a 1–0 win over Wolverhampton Wanderers in December 2007.

In January 2008, Müller suffered a horrific injury to the lateral meniscus whilst playing against Colchester United. Despite the injury he kept a clean sheet but missed the remainder of the season due to the injury. He made his comeback to football in September 2008 in a 0–0 draw with Southampton. On 15 June 2009, he left Barnsley after two years to sign for Mainz 05, where he spent four seasons before leaving in 2014.

== International career ==
Müller has been capped 14 times for German youth national teams. In the 2009–10 season, Müller was voted in the Bundesliga team of the year.

== Honours ==
Lillestrøm

- Norwegian Cup: 2007 (Though he was a Barnsley-player at the time of the final.)
