= Simon Davey =

Welsh footballer and manager

Personal information
- Date of birth: 1 October 1970 (age 56)
- Place of birth: Swansea, Wales
- Position: Midfielder

Senior career*
Years	Team	Apps	(Gls)
1987–1992	Swansea City	49	(4)
1992–1995	Carlisle United	105	(18)
1995–1998	Preston North End	106	(21)
1997	→ Darlington (loan)	11	(0)
Total		271	(43)

Managerial career
- 2006–2009: Barnsley
- 2010: Darlington
- 2010: Hereford United
- * Club domestic league appearances and goals

Simon Davey (born 1 October 1970) is a Welsh former professional footballer and football manager. He is now Executive Director of a youth club in America called Southern Soccer Academy. He played for Swansea City, Carlisle United and Preston North End and had a short loan spell with Darlington, making a total of 271 appearances in the Football League. After retiring as a player, he spent eight years as a coach at Preston, before going on to manage Barnsley, Darlington and, until October 2010, Hereford United.

== Playing career ==
In 1987, Davey made his League debut for Swansea City at the age of 16 against Torquay United and became the second youngest player ever to play for the Swans. Davey went on to make 58 appearances, scoring 5 goals in 4 years, as a midfielder. During this 4-year period he earned a Welsh Cup Winners medal and also gained European experience, playing in the Cup Winners Cup against Monaco, the French Cup winners, and Panathanaikos, the Greek champions.

In August 1992, he went from Swansea to Carlisle United on a free transfer. Within a few games, at the age of 22, he took over as team captain and led the club for a further 2 years and 5 months. In the 1993–94 season he played every game earning recognition amongst his fellow professionals by being selected for the Professional Footballers' Association (PFA) Team of the Season, an award voted for by all the professional players in the Football League. He also challenged for the title of leading scorer, eventually finishing second to David Reeves with a tally of 13. Carlisle United supporters voted one of these goals, a 35-yard free-kick against Shrewsbury Town, as their second best goal of all time. Davey went on to make 132 appearances for the club and scored a total of 23 goals. In February 1995 Davey was sold to Preston North End for £125,000. At the end of that season, Carlisle won the Division Three Championship and although Davey had already left the club he had played the minimum requirement of 26 games to qualify for a Championship medal.

At Preston, Davey earned a consecutive championship medal when Preston North End won the divisional title, Davey made his full home league debut in midfield alongside a youngster on loan from Manchester United who arrived to make his league debut too, David Beckham. They played 5 games together, Beckham scored his first league goal when the novice asked Davey if he could have a go at a free-kick Davey was planning to take; Davey stepped aside and let him have it. Davey went on to score 22 times in 122 games for Preston and was named in the PFA Team of the Season in 1995. While with the club, he also made 11 loan appearances for Darlington. Davey's playing career was cut short at the age of 27 following a back injury while training with a medicine ball.

== Coaching career ==
After retiring, Preston manager David Moyes gave Davey a chance at coaching with the club and within a short time Davey was in charge of Preston's Youth Academy, later moving to the Youth Academy at Barnsley. As part of his coaching education, he gained the UEFA C Licence, the UEFA B Licence, the UEFA A Licence and the UEFA Pro Licence in 2005 as well as the Academy Managers licence and the UEFA Youth Licence.

Davey was appointed caretaker manager of Barnsley in November 2006, following Andy Ritchie's dismissal. After a successful start he was given the job on a permanent basis at the end of the year, and later led the club to a successful fight against relegation at the end of the 2006–07 season. He later signed a four-year contract in December 2007 after an impressive start to the following season. Two months later, he led the club to a shock FA Cup win at Liverpool and 3 weeks after that, led them to victory over Chelsea to take the club into the FA Cup semi-finals at Wembley Stadium for the first time in 96 years, before losing to Cardiff City. Davey successfully kept Barnsley in the Championship for 3 consecutive seasons. On Saturday 29 August 2009, Davey's contract was terminated by mutual consent.

On 1 April 2010, Davey was appointed manager of League Two club Darlington, following the dismissal of Steve Staunton.

On 16 June 2010, Darlington chairman Raj Singh issued a statement on the club website informing fans that Davey had quit the club for personal reasons, despite being widely tipped to take over as Hereford United manager. Hereford United confirmed the appointment of Davey as the club's new manager on a two-year deal on 22 June 2010.

In May 2012, Davey began to coach youth kids for a club called Southern Soccer Academy. The club is a Brentford FC Affiliate and has teams in every age in both boys and girls, including a Men's and Women's pre-professional team.

== Managerial statistics ==
As of 4 October 2010

Managerial record by team and tenure
Team	From	To	Record				
Team	From	To	P	W	D	L	Win %
Barnsley	22 November 2006	29 August 2009	138	45	30	63	32.6
Darlington	1 April 2010	16 June 2010	10	3	2	5	30.0
Hereford United	16 June 2010	4 October 2010	11	1	2	8	9.1
Total			159	49	34	76	30.8

== Honours ==
=== As player ===
Swansea City

- Welsh Cup: 1991
- West Wales Senior Cup: 1987, 1990, 1991

Carlisle United

- Football League Third Division: 1994–95

Preston North End

- Football League Third Division: 1995–96

Individual

- PFA Team of the Year: 1995–96 Third Division
