= 2010–11 Barnsley F.C. season =

Barnsley
2010–11 season
- Chairman: Patrick Cryne
- Manager: Mark Robins
- Football League Championship: 17th
- FA Cup: Third round vs West Ham United
- Football League Cup: First round vs Rochdale
- Top goalscorer: League: Adam Hammill (8); All: Adam Hammill (8)
- Highest home attendance: 20,309 vs Leeds United, 14 September 2010
- Lowest home attendance: 10,250 vs Scunthorpe United, 2 October 2010
- Average home league attendance: 12,067
Home colours	Away colours

In the 2010–11 season, Barnsley competed in the Championship. Barnsley finished in 17th-place on 56 points. Barnsley also competed in the FA Cup and League Cup, in which they were eliminated in the third and first rounds respectively. The season covers the period from 1 July 2010 to 30 June 2011.

== Championship ==
=== Standings ===
Pos	Team	Pld	W	D	L	GF	GA	GD	Pts
15	Bristol City	46	17	9	20	62	65	−3	60
16	Portsmouth	46	15	13	18	53	60	−7	58
17	Barnsley	46	14	14	18	55	66	−11	56
18	Coventry City	46	14	13	19	54	58	−4	55
19	Derby County	46	13	10	23	58	71	−13	49

Updated to match(es) played on 7 May 2011. Source: The Football League
Rules for classification: 1) points; 2) goal difference; 3) number of goals scored.

== Squad details ==
Note: Flags indicate national team as defined under FIFA eligibility rules; some limited exceptions apply. Players may hold more than one non-FIFA nationality.

No.	Pos.	Nation	Player
1	GK	ENG	Luke Steele
2	DF	ENG	Bobby Hassell
3	DF	SCO	Jay McEveley
4	DF	ENG	Jason Shackell (C)
5	MF	ENG	Nathan Doyle
6	DF	ENG	Stephen Foster
7	FW	ENG	Danny Haynes
8	MF	SCO	Jim O'Brien
9	FW	ENG	Marlon Harewood (on loan from Blackpool)
10	MF	SRB	Goran Lovre
11	MF	IRL	Martin Devaney
12	GK	ENG	David Preece
16	FW	ENG	Liam Dickinson (on loan to Rochdale)
17	MF	ENG	Jacob Mellis (on loan from Chelsea)

No.	Pos.	Nation	Player
19	MF	ENG	Jacob Butterfield
20	MF	ARG	Hugo Colace
21	GK	ENG	Joshua Day [Academy Graduate]
22	DF	ENG	Luke Potter
23	MF	URU	Diego Arismendi (on loan from Stoke City)
24	FW	ENG	Reuben Noble-Lazarus
25	DF	ENG	Kern Miller
26	DF	ENG	Conor Branson [Academy Graduate]
27	FW	SCO	Andy Gray
28	MF	ENG	Danny Fearnehough
29	MF	ENG	Alistair Taylor
30	FW	ENG	Steven Bennett [Academy Graduate]
31	FW	ENG	Jordan Clark
32	FW	ENG	Danny Rose
33	DF	ENG	Matt Hill

== Pre-season ==
Jon Macken, Daniel Bogdanovic, Darren Moore, Anderson de Silva, Simon Heslop, Rob Kozluk and Michael Coulson were all released from Oakwell with Heslop signing for Oxford United Bogdanovic and Kozluk joining Sheffield United, Moore joining Burton Albion and Coulson joining Grimsby Town.

The Reds began their summer recruiting by bringing in Motherwell winger Jim O'Brien on a free transfer. Jason Shackell was then signed from Wolves for an undisclosed fee. Serbian midfielder Goran Lovre joined from FC Groningen. Striker Liam Dickinson then followed from Brighton for an undisclosed fee. Derby full-back Jay McEveley was next in at Oakwell on a free transfer. Next was Stoke City's Uruguayan international Diego Arismendi on a season-long loan. Contract rebel Hugo Colace then rejoined the Reds after leaving the club at the end of his previous deal.

== Squad statistics ==
Last Updated 12 April 2011

No.	Pos	Nat	Player	Total		Championship		FA Cup		League Cup	
No.	Pos	Nat	Player	Apps	Goals	Apps	Goals	Apps	Goals	Apps	Goals
1	GK	(England) ENG	Luke Steele	48	0	46	0	1	0	1	0
2	DF	(England) ENG	Bobby Hassell	39	1	37	1	1	0	1	0
3	DF	(Scotland) SCO	Jay McEevely	18	1	17	1	0	0	1	0
4	DF	(England) ENG	Jason Shackell	46	3	44	3	1	0	1	0
5	MF	(England) ENG	Nathan Doyle	45	2	43	2	1	0	1	0
6	DF	(England) ENG	Stephen Foster	35	1	33	1	1	0	1	0
7	FW	(England) ENG	Danny Haynes	20	6	20	6	0	0	0	0
8	MF	(Scotland) SCO	Jim O'Brien	34	1	33	1	1	0	0	0
9	FW	(England) ENG	Marlon Harewood	9	4	9	4	0	0	0	0
10	MF	(Serbia) SRB	Goran Lovre	23	2	21	2	1	0	1	0
11	MF	(Republic of Ireland) IRL	Martin Devaney	5	0	4	0	0	0	1	0
12	GK	(England) ENG	David Preece	0	0	0	0	0	0	0	0
14	MF	(England) ENG	Adam Hammill *	27	8	25	8	1	0	1	0
14	FW	(England) ENG	Frank Nouble L	3	0	3	0	0	0	0	0
15	DF	(England) ENG	Kieran Trippier	41	2	39	2	1	0	1	0
16	FW	(England) ENG	Liam Dickinson	4	0	3	0	0	0	1	0
17	FW	(Republic of Ireland) IRL	Jamil Adam *	0	0	0	0	0	0	0	0
17	MF	(England) ENG	Jacob Mellis	15	2	15	2	0	0	0	0
18	FW	(Argentina) ARG	Jeronimo Morales Neumann *	5	0	5	0	0	0	0	0
18	DF	(Republic of Ireland) IRL	Paul McShane	10	1	10	1	0	0	0	0
19	MF	(England) ENG	Jacob Butterfield	42	2	40	2	1	0	1	0
20	MF	(Argentina) ARG	Hugo Colace	28	1	26	1	1	0	1	0
22	DF	(England) ENG	Luke Potter	4	0	4	0	0	0	0	0
23	MF	(Uruguay) URU	Diego Arismendi	32	1	31	1	1	0	0	0
24	FW	(England) ENG	Reuben Noble-Lazarus	7	1	7	1	0	0	0	0
25	DF	(England) ENG	Kern Miller	0	0	0	0	0	0	0	0
26	DF	(England) ENG	Conor Branson	0	0	0	0	0	0	0	0
27	FW	(Scotland) SCO	Andy Gray	34	7	34	7	0	0	0	0
28	MF	(England) ENG	Danny Fearnehough	0	0	0	0	0	0	0	0
29	MF	(England) ENG	Alistair Taylor	2	0	2	0	0	0	0	0
30	FW	(England) ENG	Steven Bennett	4	0	4	0	0	0	0	0
31	FW	(England) ENG	Jordan Clark	4	0	4	0	0	0	0	0
32	FW	(England) ENG	Danny Rose	2	0	2	0	0	0	0	0
33	DF	(England) ENG	Matt Hill	24	2	23	2	1	0	0	0
36	FW	(Scotland) SCO	Garry O'Connor	23	4	22	4	1	0	0	0
39	FW	(New Zealand) NZL	Chris Wood L	7	0	7	0	0	0	0	0

=== Goalscorers ===
No.	Flag	Pos	Name	Championship	League Cup	FA Cup	Total
14	(England)	MF	Adam Hammill	8	0	0	8
27	(Scotland)	FW	Andy Gray	7	0	0	7
7	(England)	FW	Danny Haynes	6	0	0	6
9	(England)	FW	Marlon Harewood	4	0	0	4
36	(Scotland)	FW	Garry O'Connor	4	0	0	4
4	(England)	DF	Jason Shackell	3	0	0	3
17	(England)	MF	Jacob Mellis	2	0	0	2
33	(England)	DF	Matt Hill	2	0	0	2
15	(England)	DF	Kieran Trippier	2	0	0	2
23	(Uruguay)	MF	Diego Arismendi	1	0	0	1
19	(England)	MF	Jacob Butterfield	1	0	0	1
5	(England)	MF	Nathan Doyle	1	0	0	1
3	(Scotland)	DF	Jay McEveley	1	0	0	1
8	(Scotland)	MF	Jim O'Brien	1	0	0	1
10	(Serbia)	MF	Goran Lovre	1	0	0	1
20	(Argentina)	MF	Hugo Colace	1	0	0	1
2	(England)	DF	Bobby Hassell	1	0	0	1
18	(Republic of Ireland)	DF	Paul McShane	1	0	0	1
6	(England)	DF	Stephen Foster	1	0	0	1
24	(England)	FW	Reuben Noble-Lazarus	1	0	0	1

== Transfers ==
=== In ===
Name	Club	Fee	Ref.
(Scotland) Jim O'Brien	(Scotland) Motherwell	Free	
(Serbia) Goran Lovre	(Netherlands) F.C. Groningen	Free	
(England) Jason Shackell	Wolverhampton Wanderers	Undisclosed	
(England) Liam Dickinson	Brighton & Hove Albion	Undisclosed	
(Scotland) Jay McEveley	Derby County	Free	
(Argentina) Hugo Colace	Unattached	Contract extension	
(Argentina) Jeronimo Neumann	(Argentina) Estudiantes de la Plata	Free	
(Scotland) Garry O'Connor	Birmingham City	Free	
(England) Kern Miller	Lincoln City	Free	
(England) Danny Haynes	Bristol City	Undisclosed	

=== Out ===
  - Indicates player joined club after being released.

Name	Club	Fee	Ref.
(Brazil) Anderson de Silva	Released	—	
(Malta) Daniel Bogdanovic	Sheffield United*	Free	
(England) Michael Coulson	Grimsby Town*	Free	
(Argentina) Hugo Colace	Released	—	
(England) Simon Heslop	Oxford United	Free	
(England) Rob Kozluk	Sheffield United	Free	
(Republic of Ireland) Jon Macken	Walsall*	Free	
(Jamaica) Darren Moore	Burton Albion*	Free	
(Canada) Iain Hume	Preston North End	Undisclosed	
(England) Adam Hammill	Wolverhampton Wanderers	Undisclosed	

=== Loans in ===
Name	Club	Arrival date	Return date	Ref.
(Uruguay) Diego Arismendi	Stoke City	12 July 2010	End of Season	
(England) Kieran Trippier	Manchester City	12 July 2010	12 January 2011	
(Scotland) Garry O'Connor	Birmingham City	10 September 2010	10 October 2010	
(New Zealand) Chris Wood	West Bromwich Albion	23 September 2010	23 December 2010	
(England) Matt Hill	Wolves	20 October 2010	20 November 2010	
(England) Paul Hayes	Preston	28 October 2010	1 January 2011	
(Scotland) Garry O'Connor	Birmingham City	8 November 2010	8 December 2010	
(England) Jacob Mellis	Chelsea	31 January 2011	31 May 2011	
(England) Frank Nouble	West Ham	31 January 2011	31 May 2011	
(Republic of Ireland) Paul McShane	Hull City	16 February 2011	16 April 2011	
(England) Marlon Harewood	Blackpool	26 February 2011	8 May 2011	

=== Loans out ===
Name	Club	Departure date	Return date	Ref.
(Jamaica) O'Neil Thompson	Hereford United	2 July 2010	End of Season	
(Canada) Iain Hume	Preston North End	17 September 2010	3 Months	

== Disciplinary record ==
=== Yellow cards ===
No.	Flag	Pos	Name	Championship	League Cup	FA Cup	Total
5	(England)	DF	Nathan Doyle	8	1	0	(yellow card) 9
23	(Uruguay)	MF	Diego Arismendi	7	0	0	(yellow card) 7
20	(Argentina)	MF	Hugo Colace	7	0	0	(yellow card) 7
2	(England)	DF	Bobby Hassell	6	0	0	(yellow card) 6
7	(England)	FW	Danny Haynes	5	0	0	(yellow card) 5
14	(England)	MF	Adam Hammill	4	0	0	(yellow card) 4
6	(England)	DF	Stephen Foster	4	0	0	(yellow card) 4
18	(Republic of Ireland)	DF	Paul McShane	4	0	0	(yellow card) 4
15	(England)	DF	Kieran Trippier	4	0	0	(yellow card) 4
10	(Serbia)	MF	Goran Lovre	3	0	0	(yellow card) 3
4	(England)	DF	Jason Shackell	3	0	0	(yellow card) 3
33	(England)	DF	Matt Hill	3	0	0	(yellow card) 3
19	(England)	MF	Jacob Butterfield	3	0	0	(yellow card) 3
17	(England)	MF	Jacob Mellis	3	0	0	(yellow card) 3
3	(Scotland)	DF	Jay McEveley	2	0	0	(yellow card) 2
8	(Scotland)	MF	Jim O'Brien	2	0	0	(yellow card) 2
36	(Scotland)	FW	Garry O'Connor	1	0	0	(yellow card) 1
16	(England)	FW	Liam Dickinson	1	0	0	(yellow card) 1
22	(England)	DF	Luke Potter	1	0	0	(yellow card) 1
9	(England)	FW	Marlon Harewood	1	0	0	(yellow card) 1
31	(England)	MF	Jordan Clark	1	0	0	(yellow card) 1

=== Red cards ===
No.	Flag	Pos	Name	Championship	League Cup	FA Cup	Total
4	(England)	DF	Jason Shackell	1	0	0	(red card) 1
6	(England)	DF	Stephen Foster	1	0	0	(red card) 1
18	(Republic of Ireland)	DF	Paul McShane	1	0	0	(red card) 1

== Fixtures and results ==
=== Friendlies ===
Friendly match details
Date	Opponent	Venue	Result	Score F–A	Scorers	Attendance	Ref.
20 July 2010	York City	A	W	2–0	Gray (2)	1,393	
21 July 2010	Ilkeston Town**	A	W	4–3	Fearnehough, Hammill, Dickinson, Bennett	214	
24 July 2010	Huddersfield Town	H	W	3–1	Hammill (3)	4,478	
27 July 2010	Sheffield Wednesday	H	W	2–0	Devaney, Lovre	8,534	
29 July 2010	Buxton**	A	D	1–1	Neumann	240	
31 July 2010	Chesterfield	A	W	2–0	Gray, Dickinson	1,750	

Star denotes a Barnsley XI friendly.

=== Championship ===
Championship match details
Date	League position	Opponent	Venue	Result	Score F–A	Scorers	Attendance	Ref.
7 August 2010	24th	Queens Park Rangers	A	L	0–4		13,445	
14 August 2010	15th	Crystal Palace	H	W	1–0	McCarthy 35' o.g.,	11,353	
21 August 2010	12th	Bristol City	A	D	3–3	Gray 4', 12' pen., Hammill 51'	13,585	
28 August 2010	10th	Middlesbrough	H	W	2–0	Shackell 28', Hammill 90+5'	11,767	
11 September 2010	11th	Norwich City	A	L	1–2	McEveley 45+2'	24,624	
14 September 2010	7th	Leeds United	H	W	5–2	O'Connor 42', O'Brien 49', Arismendi 65', Collins 82' o.g., Hammill 83'	20,309	
18 September 2010	10th	Derby County	H	D	1–1	Hammill 48'	12,089	
25 September 2010	14th	Reading	A	L	0–3		14,830	
28 September 2010	13th	Scunthorpe United	A	D	0–0		5,421	
2 October 2010	15th	Cardiff City	H	L	1–2	Shackell 63'	11,211	
16 October 2010	14th	Nottingham Forest	H	W	3–1	Doyle 4', Gray 56' pen., Butterfield 87'	12,844	
19 October 2010	16th	Burnley	A	L	0–3		14,428	
23 October 2010	17th	Coventry City	A	L	0–3		14,573	
30 October 2010	17th	Hull City	H	D	1–1	Hammill 24'	10,566	
6 November 2010	18th	Leicester City	H	L	0–2		12,360	
9 November 2010	17th	Preston North End	A	W	2–1	Hammill 44', O'Connor 89'	8,994	
13 November 2010	16th	Ipswich Town	A	W	3–1	Lovre 21', Fulop 27' o.g., O'Connor 50'	18,024	
20 November 2010	12th	Portsmouth	H	W	1–0	Hammill 13'	10,908	
27 November 2010	12th	Watford	H	D	0–0		10,653	
11 December 2010	10th	Sheffield United	H	W	1–0	Colace 37'	12,976	
26 December 2010	16th	Burnley	H	L	1–2	Hammill 25'	14,219	
28 December 2010	16th	Swansea City	A	L	0–1		15,093	
1 January 2011	18th	Nottingham Forest	A	D	2–2	Hill 17', Gray 50'	22,179	
3 January 2011	16th	Coventry City	H	W	2–1	Doyle 4', Lovre 57'	11,118	
15 January 2011	16th	Hull City	A	L	0–2		21,222	
22 January 2011	16th	Swansea City	H	D	1–1	Hassell 14'	10,481	
25 January 2011	13th	Doncaster Rovers	A	W	2–0	Haynes 54', 67'	10,740	
28 January 2011	13th	Millwall	A	L	0–2		10,087	
1 February 2011	12th	Preston North End	H	W	2–0	O'Connor 22', Haynes 90+3'	10,740	
5 February 2011	13th	Leicester City	A	L	1–4	Mellis 45'	22,667	
12 February 2011	13th	Ipswich Town	H	D	1–1	Mellis 90+3'	10,904	
19 February 2011	14th	Portsmouth	A	L	0–1		14,318	
22 February 2011	14th	Leeds United	A	D	3–3	Shackell 2', Hill 48', Trippier 82'	26,289	
26 February 2011	15th	Norwich City	H	L	0–2		12,461	
5 March 2011	16th	Derby County	A	D	0–0		26,251	
8 March 2011	15th	Scunthorpe United	H	W	2–1	Harewood 62', 84'	10,250	
13 March 2011	15th	Cardiff City	A	D	2–2	Gray 29', 89'	23,065	
19 March 2011	16th	Reading	H	L	0–1		10,784	
2 April 2011	16th	Crystal Palace	A	L	1–2	Harewood 43'	19,344	
9 April 2011	16th	Bristol City	H	W	4–2	Gray 32' pen.', Haynes 40', Butterfield 45+2', McShane 56'	10,257	
12 April 2011	16th	Queens Park Rangers	H	L	0–1		11,381	
16 April 2011	17th	Middlesbrough	A	D	1–1	Harewood 22'	16,107	
23 April 2011	18th	Watford	A	L	0–1		14,098	
25 April 2011	18th	Doncaster Rovers	H	D	2–2	Foster 69', Trippier 87'	12,418	
30 April 2011	18th	Sheffield United	A	D	2–2	Haynes 15', 84'	22,366	
7 May 2011	17th	Millwall	H	W	1–0	Noble-Lazarus 60'	11,136	

=== FA Cup ===
FA Cup match details
Round	Date	Opponents	Venue	Result	Score F–A	Scorers	Attendance	Ref.
Third round	8 January 2011	West Ham United	A	L	0–2		32,159	

=== League Cup ===
League Cup match details
Round	Date	Opponents	Venue	Result	Score F–A	Scorers	Attendance	Ref.
First round	10 August 2010	Rochdale	H	L	0–1		4,107	

=== Penalties awarded ===
Date	Success?	Penalty Taker	Opponent	Competition
21 August 2010	✓	(Scotland) Andy Gray	Bristol City	Championship
16 October 2010	✓	(Scotland) Andy Gray	Nottingham Forest	Championship
9 March 2011	✓	(Scotland) Andy Gray	Bristol City	Championship
