= 2011–12 Barnsley F.C. season =

Barnsley
2011–12 season
- Chairman: Patrick Cryne
- Manager: Keith Hill
- Football League Championship: 21st
- FA Cup: Third round
- Football League Cup: First round
- Top goalscorer: League: Craig Davies (11); All: Ricardo Vaz Tê (12)
- Highest home attendance: 11,783 (vs. Doncaster Rovers, 19 November 2011)
- Lowest home attendance: League: 8,900 (vs. Bristol City, 29 October 2011); All: 4,331 (vs. Morecambe, 9 August 2011)
- Average home league attendance: 9,317
Home colours	Away colours

The 2011–12 season was Barnsley's fifth consecutive season in the Championship since promotion in 2006.

== Season overview ==
=== Events ===
- 15 May 2011 – Mark Robins resigns as manager after 2 years in charge of Barnsley.
- 20 May 2011 – Barnsley are granted permission by Rochdale to speak to manager Keith Hill.
- 1 June 2011 – Keith Hill is appointed as manager on a year contract. David Flitcroft is appointed as assistant manager.

=== Championship ===
==== Standings ====
Pos	Team	Pld	W	D	L	GF	GA	GD	Pts	Promotion or relegation
19	Nottingham Forest	46	14	8	24	48	63	−15	50	
20	Bristol City	46	12	13	21	44	68	−24	49	
21	Barnsley	46	13	9	24	49	74	−25	48	
22	Portsmouth (R)	46	13	11	22	50	59	−9	40 (Note: Portsmouth were deducted 10 points for entering administration.)	Relegation to League One
23	Coventry City (R)	46	9	13	24	41	65	−24	40	Relegation to League One

Updated to match(es) played on 28 April 2012. Source: BBC Sport
Rules for classification: 1) points; 2) goal difference; 3) number of goals scored.
(R) Relegated

==== Results summary ====
Overall								Home						Away					
Pld	W	D	L	GF	GA	GD	Pts	W	D	L	GF	GA	GD	W	D	L	GF	GA	GD
46	13	9	24	49	73	−24	48	9	4	10	31	36	−5	4	5	14	18	37	−19

Last updated: 29 April 2012.

==== Result round by round ====
Round	1	2	3	4	5	6	7	8	9	10	11	12	13	14	15	16	17	18	19	20	21	22	23	24	25	26	27	28	29	30	31	32	33	34	35	36	37	38	39	40	41	42	43	44	45	46
Ground	A	H	H	A	A	H	H	A	A	H	A	H	A	H	H	A	H	A	A	H	H	A	H	H	A	A	H	H	A	A	H	H	A	H	A	A	H	A	H	A	H	A	H	A	A	H
Result	D	L	L	W	D	D	D	D	D	W	L	W	L	L	W	L	W	W	W	W	L	L	L	W	L	W	L	W	L	L	W	L	L	D	L	L	L	L	W	L	L	D	L	L	L	D
Position	14	18	20	16	17	15	16	17	18	16	17	15	17	19	18	18	15	14	13	8	12	13	16	13	16	14	14	13	15	16	14	14	14	15	16	17	17	18	17	18	18	18	20	20	21	21

Updated to match(es) played on 29 April 2012. Source:
A = Away; H = Home; W = Win; D = Draw; L = Loss

== Squad details ==
No.	Name	Nat.	Place of birth	Date of birth	Club apps.	Club goals	Int. caps	Int. goals	Previous club	Date joined	Fee	End
1	Luke Steele	(England)	Peterborough	24 September 1984	119	0	–	–	West Bromwich Albion	21 May 2008	Free	2013
2	Bobby Hassell	(England)	Derby	4 June 1980	253	7	–	–	Mansfield Town	1 July 2004	Free	2012
3	Jay McEveley	(Scotland)	Liverpool (England)	11 February 1985	18	1	3	0	Derby County	6 July 2010	Free	2012
4	Rob Edwards	(Wales)	Madeley	25 December 1982	–	–	–	–	Blackpool	1 July 2011	Free	2013
5	Nathan Doyle	(England)	Derby	12 January 1987	79	2	–	–	Hull City	13 January 2010	Free	2012
6	Stephen Foster	(England)	Warrington	18 September 1980	168	9	–	–	Burnley	27 August 2007	£100,000	2012
7	Stephen Dawson	(Republic of Ireland)	Dublin	4 December 1985	–	–	–	–	Leyton Orient	31 January 2012	Undisclosed	2014
8	Jim O'Brien	(Republic of Ireland)	Vale of Leven (Scotland)	28 September 1987	34	1	–	–	Motherwell	1 June 2010	Undisclosed	2013
9	Craig Davies	(Wales)	Burton upon Trent	9 January 1986	–	–	5	0	Chesterfield	1 July 2011	Free	2013
10	Matt Done	(England)	Oswestry	22 July 1988	–	–	–	–	Rochdale	21 June 2011	Undisclosed	2013
11	David Perkins	(England)	Heysham	21 June 1982	–	–	–	–	Colchester United	1 June 2011	Free	2013
12	David Preece	(England)	Sunderland	26 August 1976	7	0	–	–	Odense Boldklub	16 July 2009	Free	2012
13	Chris Dagnall	(England)	Liverpool	15 April 1986	–	–	–	–	Scunthorpe United	5 January 2012	Undisclosed	2014
14	Scott Wiseman	(England)	Hull	13 December 1985	–	–	–	–	Rochdale	21 June 2011	Undisclosed	2014
15	Jimmy McNulty	(Scotland)	Liverpool	13 February 1985	–	–	–	–	Brighton & Hove Albion	24 June 2011	Undisclosed	2013
16	Korey Smith	(England)	Hatfield	31 January 1991	–	–	–	–	Norwich City	25 January 2012	Loan	2012
17	David Cotterill	(Wales)	Cardiff	4 December 1987	–	–	–	–	Free agent	14 February 2012	Free	2012
18	Kallum Higginbotham	(England)	Salford	15 June 1989	–	–	–	–	Huddersfield Town	22 March 2012	Loan	30 May 2012
19	Jacob Butterfield	(England)	Bradford	10 June 1990	75	3	–	–	N/A	1 July 2007	Trainee	2011
20	Scott Golbourne	(England)	Bristol	29 February 1988	–	–	–	–	Exeter City	30 January 2012	Undisclosed	2014
21	Frank Nouble	(England)	Lewisham	24 September 1991	4	0	–	–	West Ham United	8 March 2012	Loan	9 April 2012
22	Luke Potter	(England)	Barnsley	17 July 1989	21	0	–	–	N/A	1 July 2006	Trainee	2011
23	Lee Collins	(England)	Telford	28 September 1988	–	–	–	–	Port Vale	15 March 2012	Loan	2012
24	Reuben Noble-Lazarus	(England)	Huddersfield	16 August 1993	11	0	–	–	N/A	29 September 2008	Trainee	2013
25	David Button	(England)	Stevenage	27 February 1989	–	–	–	–	Tottenham Hotspur	20 March 2012	Loan	15 April 2012
27	Andy Gray	(Scotland)	Harrogate (England)	15 November 1977	65	13	2	0	Charlton Athletic	21 August 2009	Undisclosed	2012
28	Michael Tonge	(England)	Manchester	7 April 1983	–	–	–	–	Stoke City	24 January 2012	Loan	2012
29	Alastair Taylor	(England)	Sheffield	13 September 1991	3	0	–	–	N/A	1 July 2010	Trainee	2012
31	Jordan Clarke	(England)	Barnsley	22 September 1993	4	0	–	–	N/A	1 April 2011	Trainee	2012
32	Danny Rose	(England)	Barnsley	10 December 1993	1	0	–	–	N/A	1 June 2010	Trainee	
33	Paul Digby	(England)	Sheffield	2 February 1995	–	–	–	–	N/A	1 August 2010	Trainee	2014
34	John Stones	(England)	Barnsley	28 May 1994	–	–	–	–	N/A	7 December 2011	Trainee	2013

== Squad statistics ==
=== Appearances and goals ===
Last Updated 29 April 2012

No.	Pos	Nat	Player	Total		Championship		FA Cup		League Cup	
No.	Pos	Nat	Player	Apps	Goals	Apps	Goals	Apps	Goals	Apps	Goals
1	GK	(England) ENG	Luke Steele	38	0	36+0	0	1+0	0	1+0	0
2	DF	(England) ENG	Bobby Hassell	19	0	17+0	0	1+0	0	1+0	0
3	DF	(Scotland) SCO	Jay McEveley	31	0	25+4	0	1+0	0	1+0	0
4	DF	(Wales) WAL	Rob Edwards	18	0	17+0	0	0+0	0	1+0	0
5	MF	(England) ENG	Nathan Doyle	20	0	15+5	0	0+0	0	0+0	0
6	DF	(England) ENG	Stephen Foster	42	1	41+0	1	1+0	0	0+0	0
7	MF	(Republic of Ireland) IRL	Stephen Dawson	12	0	9+3	0	0+0	0	0+0	0
8	MF	(Scotland) SCO	Jim O'Brien	32	2	23+8	2	0+0	0	1+0	0
9	FW	(Wales) WAL	Craig Davies	46	11	32+12	11	1+0	0	1+0	0
10	MF	(England) ENG	Matt Done	33	4	22+9	4	1+0	0	0+1	0
11	MF	(England) ENG	David Perkins	35	1	31+2	1	1+0	0	0+1	0
12	GK	(England) ENG	David Preece	1	0	1+0	0	0+0	0	0+0	0
13	FW	(England) ENG	Chris Dagnall	9	0	4+5	0	0+0	0	0+0	0
14	DF	(England) ENG	Scott Wiseman	44	1	33+9	1	0+1	0	0+1	0
15	DF	(Scotland) SCO	Jimmy McNulty	46	2	43+1	2	1+0	0	1+0	0
16	MF	(England) ENG	Korey Smith	12	0	10+2	0	0+0	0	0+0	0
17	MF	(Wales) WAL	David Cotterill	11	1	6+5	1	0+0	0	0+0	0
18	FW	(England) ENG	Kallum Higginbotham	5	0	2+3	0	0+0	0	0+0	0
19	MF	(England) ENG	Jacob Butterfield	25	5	24+0	5	0+0	0	1+0	0
20	DF	(England) ENG	Scott Golbourne	12	1	10+2	1	0+0	0	0+0	0
21	FW	(England) ENG	Frank Nouble	6	0	5+1	0	0+0	0	0+0	0
22	DF	(England) ENG	Luke Potter	0	0	0+0	0	0+0	0	0+0	0
23	DF	(England) ENG	Lee Collins	7	0	4+3	0	0+0	0	0+0	0
24	FW	(England) ENG	Reuben Noble-Lazarus	9	0	2+6	0	0+1	0	0+0	0
25	GK	(England) ENG	David Button	9	0	9+0	0	0+0	0	0+0	0
27	FW	(Scotland) SCO	Andy Gray	32	8	25+6	8	0+1	0	0+0	0
28	MF	(England) ENG	Michael Tonge	10	0	7+3	0	0+0	0	0+0	0
29	MF	(England) ENG	Alistair Taylor	4	0	0+3	0	0+0	0	0+1	0
30	GK	(Lithuania) LTU	Lukas Lidakevicius	0	0	0+0	0	0+0	0	0+0	0
31	FW	(England) ENG	Jordan Clark	2	0	1+1	0	0+0	0	0+0	0
32	FW	(England) ENG	Danny Rose	4	0	2+2	0	0+0	0	0+0	0
33	MF	(England) ENG	Paul Digby	4	0	2+2	0	0+0	0	0+0	0
34	DF	(England) ENG	John Stones	2	0	0+2	0	0+0	0	0+0	0
--	MF	(England) ENG	Kern Miller	0	0	0+0	0	0+0	0	0+0	0
Player who left Barnsley during the season
	DF	(England) ENG	Miles Addison	13	0	9+2	0	1+0	0	1+0	0
	MF	(England) ENG	Danny Drinkwater	18	1	16+1	1	1+0	0	0+0	0
	FW	(England) ENG	Danny Haynes	13	0	4+8	0	0+0	0	1+0	0
	MF	(Scotland) SCO	Cameron Park	3	0	1+2	0	0+0	0	0+0	0
	FW	(England) ENG	Nile Ranger	5	0	3+2	0	0+0	0	0+0	0
	FW	(Portugal) POR	Ricardo Vaz Tê	24	12	12+10	10	1+0	2	1+0	0

=== Top scorers ===
Place	Position	Nation	Number	Name	Championship	FA Cup	League Cup	Total
1	FW	(Portugal)	~~18~~	Ricardo Vaz Tê	10	2	0	12
2	FW	(Wales)	9	Craig Davies	11	0	0	11
3	FW	(Scotland)	27	Andy Gray	8	0	0	8
4	MF	(England)	19	Jacob Butterfield	5	0	0	5
5	MF	(England)	10	Matt Done	4	0	0	4
6	DF	(England)	15	Jimmy McNulty	2	0	0	2
6	MF	(Scotland)	8	Jim O'Brien	2	0	0	2
8	MF	(Wales)	17	David Cotterill	1	0	0	1
8	MF	(England)	~~20~~	Danny Drinkwater	1	0	0	1
8	DF	(England)	6	Stephen Foster	1	0	0	1
8	DF	(England)	20	Scott Golbourne	1	0	0	1
8	MF	(England)	11	David Perkins	1	0	0	1
8	DF	(England)	14	Scott Wiseman	1	0	0	1
				Totals	48	2	0	50

=== Disciplinary record ===
Number	Nation	Position	Name	Championship		FA Cup		League Cup		Total	
Number	Nation	Position	Name	Yellow card	Red card	Yellow card	Red card	Yellow card	Red card	Yellow card	Red card
11	(England)	MF	David Perkins	4	1	0	0	0	0	4	1
27	(Scotland)	FW	Andy Gray	7	0	0	0	0	0	7	0
5	(England)	MF	Nathan Doyle	1	1	0	0	0	0	1	1
8	(Scotland)	MF	Jim O'Brien	6	0	0	0	0	0	6	0
7	(Republic of Ireland)	MF	Stephen Dawson	5	0	0	0	0	0	5	0
~~20~~	(England)	MF	Danny Drinkwater	5	0	0	0	0	0	5	0
6	(England)	DF	Stephen Foster	5	0	0	0	0	0	5	0
3	(Scotland)	DF	Jay McEveley	4	0	1	0	0	0	5	0
15	(Scotland)	DF	Jimmy McNulty	5	0	0	0	0	0	5	0
~~17~~	(England)	DF	Miles Addison	3	0	1	0	0	0	4	0
2	(England)	DF	Bobby Hassell	2	0	0	0	1	0	3	0
17	(Wales)	MF	David Cotterill	2	0	0	0	0	0	2	0
4	(Wales)	DF	Rob Edwards	2	0	0	0	0	0	2	0
28	(England)	MF	Michael Tonge	2	0	0	0	0	0	2	0
19	(England)	MF	Jacob Butterfield	1	0	0	0	0	0	1	0
9	(Wales)	FW	Craig Davies	1	0	0	0	0	0	1	0
20	(England)	DF	Scott Golbourne	1	0	0	0	0	0	1	0
18	(England)	FW	Kallum Higginbotham	1	0	0	0	0	0	1	0
32	(England)	FW	Danny Rose	1	0	0	0	0	0	1	0
16	(England)	MF	Korey Smith	1	0	0	0	0	0	1	0
29	(England)	MF	Alastair Taylor	1	0	0	0	0	0	1	0
18	(Portugal)	FW	Ricardo Vaz Tê	1	0	0	0	0	0	1	0
14	(England)	DF	Scott Wiseman	1	0	0	0	0	0	1	0
			Totals	61	2	2	0	1	0	64	2

==== Suspensions served ====
Date	Player	Reason	Games Missed
1 November	Jim O'Brien	Reached five yellow cards	Brighton & Hove Albion (A)
6 November	Danny Drinkwater	Reached five yellow cards	Doncaster Rovers (H)
26 November	David Perkins	Sent off vs Leeds United	Peterborough (A), Crystal Palace (H), Ipswich (H)
24 March	Nathan Doyle	Sent off vs Peterborough United	Ipswich (A), West Ham (H), Blackpool (A)

== Transfers ==
=== In ===
No.	Pos.	Nat.	Name	Age	EU	Moving from	Type	Transfer window	Ends	Transfer fee	Source
9	FW	(Wales) (England)	Craig Davies	25	EU	Chesterfield	Free Transfer	Summer	2013	Free	
11	MF	(England)	David Perkins	29	EU	Colchester United	Free Transfer	Summer	2013	Free	
10	MF	(England)	Matt Done	22	EU	Rochdale	Transfer	Summer	2013	Undisclosed	
14	DF	(England)	Scott Wiseman	25	EU	Rochdale	Transfer	Summer	2014	Undisclosed	
15	DF	(Scotland) (England)	Jimmy McNulty	26	EU	Brighton & Hove Albion	Transfer	Summer	2013	Undisclosed	
4	DF	(Wales) (England)	Rob Edwards	28	EU	Blackpool	Free Transfer	Summer	2013	Free	
18	FW	(Portugal)	Ricardo Vaz Tê	24	EU	Hibernian (Scotland)	Free Transfer	Summer	2012	Free	
34	DF	(England)	John Stones	17	EU	Youth system	Promoted		2013	Youth system	
13	FW	(England)	Chris Dagnall	25	EU	Scunthorpe United	Transfer	Winter	2015	Undisclosed	
20	DF	(England)	Scott Golbourne	23	EU	Exeter City	Transfer	Winter	2014	Undisclosed	
7	MF	(Republic of Ireland)	Stephen Dawson	26	EU	Leyton Orient	Transfer	Winter	2014	Undisclosed	
17	MF	(Wales)	David Cotterill	24	EU	Free agent	Free Transfer		2012	Free	

=== Loans in ===
No.	Pos.	Name	Country	Age	Loan club	Started	Ended	Start source	End source
17	DF	Miles Addison	(England)	23	Derby County	24 Jun	30 Jan		
21	MF	Cameron Park	(Scotland)	19	Middlesbrough	23 Aug	23 Oct		
20	MF	Danny Drinkwater	(England)	21	Manchester United	23 Aug	19 Jan		
40	FW	Nile Ranger	(England)	20	Newcastle United	18 Nov	22 Dec		
23	MF	Michael Tonge	(England)	29	Stoke City	24 Jan	30 May		
16	MF	Korey Smith	(England)	21	Norwich City	25 Jan	30 May		
21	FW	Frank Nouble	(England)	20	West Ham United	8 March	9 April		
23	DF	Lee Collins	(England)	23	Port Vale	15 March	30 May		
25	GK	David Button	(England)	23	Tottenham Hotspur	20 March	30 May		
18	FW	Kallum Higginbotham	(England)	22	Huddersfield Town	22 March	26 April		

Sources: For loan start source see "Start source". For loan end source see "End source".
EU = if holds or not a European Union passport; Country: when 2 flags, 1st flag = country that plays for internationally, 2nd flag = country of birth; No. = number on jersey; P = Position (for position name, pause mouse pointer on abbreviation); Name = Name on jersey (for more extensive name, pause mouse pointer on name); In/Out = In: The player came in on loan, Out: The player went out on loan; Loan club = the club that the player moved on loan to or the club that the player came from on loan; Started = the date when the player's loan started; Ended = the date when the player's loan ended.

=== Out ===
No.	Pos.	Name	Country	Age	Type	Moving to	Transfer window	Transfer fee	Apps	Goals	Source
20	MF	Hugo Colace	(Argentina)	27	Free Transfer	Estudiantes Tecos (Mexico)	Summer	Free	108	0	
30	FW	Steven Bennett	(England)	19	Out of Contract		Summer	Free	4	0	
26	DF	Conor Branson	(England)	19	Out of Contract		Summer	Free	0	0	
11	MF	Martin Devaney	(England)	30	Out of Contract	Tranmere Rovers	Summer	Free	176	18	
33	DF	Matt Hill	(England)	31	Out of Contract	Blackpool	Summer	Free	24	2	
28	MF	Danny Fearnehough	(England)	19	Out of Contract		Summer	Free	0	0	
16	FW	Liam Dickinson	(England)	25	Free Transfer	Plymouth Argyle	Summer	Free	4	0	
4	DF	Jason Shackell	(England)	27	Transfer	Derby County	Summer	£1,000,000	46	4	
16	MF	Goran Lovre	(Serbia)	29	Released	Anorthosis Famagusta (Cyprus)		Free	23	2	
7	FW	Danny Haynes	(England)	23	Transfer	Charlton Athletic	Winter	Undisclosed	33	6	
18	FW	Ricardo Vaz Tê	(Portugal)	25	Transfer	West Ham United	Winter	Undisclosed	24	12	

EU = if holds or not a European Union passport; Country: when 2 flags, 1st flag = country that plays for internationally, 2nd flag = country of birth; N = number on jersey; P = Position (for position name, pause mouse pointer on abbreviation); Name = Name on jersey (for more extensive name, pause mouse pointer on name); Age = age on the day of the signing; Moving from = only indicate the club the player was playing before start playing for this club in this season, for the type of the moving see Status column; Moving to = only indicates the club the player is going to play next, for the type of the moving see Status column; Ends = when the player's current contract ends; n/a = Not applicable; Apps = Total number of competitive appearances (including substitute appearances) at the club prior to departure; Goals = Total number of competitive goals scored at the club prior to departure.

=== Loans out ===
No.	Pos.	Name	Country	Age	Loan club	Started	Ended	Start source	End source
25	DF	Kern Miller	(England)	20	Accrington Stanley	28 July	9 Jan		
25	DF	Kern Miller	(England)	21	Hereford United	9 January	30 May		
13	FW	Chris Dagnall	(England)	26	Bradford City	15 March	30 May		
3	DF	Jay McEveley	(Scotland) (England)	27	Swindon Town	22 March	30 May		

Sources: For loan start source see "Start source". For loan end source see "End source".
EU = if holds or not a European Union passport; Country: when 2 flags, 1st flag = country that plays for internationally, 2nd flag = country of birth; No. = number on jersey; P = Position (for position name, pause mouse pointer on abbreviation); Name = Name on jersey (for more extensive name, pause mouse pointer on name); In/Out = In: The player came in on loan, Out: The player went out on loan; Loan club = the club that the player moved on loan to or the club that the player came from on loan; Started = the date when the player's loan started; Ended = the date when the player's loan ended.

=== Contracts ===
No.	Pos.	Nat.	Name	Age	Status	Contract length	Expiry date	Source
27	FW	(Scotland)	Andy Gray	33	Signed	1 year	2012	
24	FW	(England)	Reuben Noble-Lazarus	17	Signed	2 years	2013	
29	MF	(England)	Alastair Taylor	19	Signed	1 year	2012	
12	GK	(England)	David Preece	34	Signed	1 year	2012	
38	MF	(England)	Paul Digby	17	Signed	2 years	2014	

== Fixtures and results ==
=== Pre-season ===
23 July 2011 Friendly	Barnsley	5–1	Grimsby Town	Barnsley
15:00 BST	Davies 24', 59' (pen.); Vaz Te 45'; Haynes 71'; Butterfield 90'	Report	Duffy 57'	Stadium: Oakwell

26 July 2011 Friendly	Barnsley	2–0	Sheffield Wednesday	Barnsley
19:30 BST	Perkins 7'; O'Brien 80'	Report		Stadium: Oakwell; Attendance: 6,519

30 July 2011 Friendly	Scunthorpe United	0–5	Barnsley	Scunthorpe, North Lincolnshire
15:00 BST		Report	Vaz Tê 8'; Davies 15', 33'; Reid 20'; Doyle 44'	Stadium: Glanford Park; Attendance: 1,432; Referee: Jon Moss

=== Championship ===
6 August 1	Nottingham Forest	0–0	Barnsley	Nottingham
15:00				Stadium: City Ground; Attendance: 22,951

13 August 2	Barnsley	0–1	Southampton	Barnsley
15:00			Connolly 30'	Stadium: Oakwell; Attendance: 10,501

16 August 3	Barnsley	1–3	Middlesbrough	Barnsley
19:45	McManus 4' (o.g.)		McDonald 11'; Robson 13'; Emnes 44'	Stadium: Oakwell; Attendance: 10,603

20 August 4	Reading	1–2	Barnsley	Madejski Stadium
15:00	Robson-Kanu 74' (pen.)		Foster 27'; Done 68'	Attendance: 15,878

27 August 5	Millwall	0–0	Barnsley	The Den
15:00				Attendance: 10,033

10 September 6	Barnsley	1–1	Leicester City	Oakwell
15:00	Butterfield 38'		King 46'	Attendance: 10,862

17 September 7	Barnsley	1–1	Watford	Oakwell
15:00	Gray 57'		Sordell 37'	Attendance: 9,733

24 September 8	Birmingham City	1–1	Barnsley	St Andrew's
15:00	Burke 86'		Butterfield 33'	Attendance: 17,836

27 September 9	Derby County	1–1	Barnsley	Pride Park Stadium
19:45	S Davies 62' (pen.)		Butterfield 35'	Attendance: 23,454

1 October 10	Barnsley	2–0	Coventry City	Oakwell
15:00	Gray 42' (pen.), 55'			Attendance: 9,497

15 October 11	Portsmouth	2–0	Barnsley	Fratton Park
15:00	Norris 61'; Varney 62'			Attendance: 11,261

18 October 12	Barnsley	2–0	Burnley	Oakwell
19:45	Butterfield 21'; Vaz Tê 81'			Attendance: 9,692

22 October 13	Cardiff City	5–3	Barnsley	Cardiff City Stadium
15:00	Miller 10'; Mason 34'; Gunnarsson 38', 71'; Cowie 60'		Drinkwater 36'; McNulty 82'; Vaz Tê 86'	Attendance: 20,665

29 October 14	Barnsley	1–2	Bristol City	Oakwell
15:00	Davies 74'		Adomah 14'; Maynard 90+3'	Attendance: 8,900

1 November 15	Barnsley	2–1	Hull City	Oakwell
19:45	Davies 48'; Gray 59'		Fryatt 79'	Attendance: 9,869

6 November 16	Brighton & Hove Albion	2–0	Barnsley	Falmer Stadium
15:00	Greer 44'; Harley 57'			Attendance: 19,841

19 November 17	Barnsley	2–0	Doncaster Rovers	Oakwell
15:00	Davies 30', 64'			Attendance: 11,783

26 November 18	Leeds United	1–2	Barnsley	Elland Road
15:00	McCormack 55'		Vaz Tê 27'; Davies 43'	Attendance: 25,900

3 December 19	Peterborough United	3–4	Barnsley	London Road Stadium
15:00	Boyd 64'; Bennet 68'; Frecklington 70'		O'Brien 17'; Butterfield 45+1'; Vaz Tê 55'; Davies 78'	Attendance: 8,320

6 December 20	Barnsley	2–1	Crystal Palace	Oakwell
19:45	Vaz Tê 1', 77'		Easter 33'	Attendance: 9,524

10 December 21	Barnsley	3–5	Ipswich Town	Oakwell
15:00	Davies 14' (pen.), 89'; Vaz Tê 39'		Andrews 46', 49'; Collins 66'; Chopra 68'; Scotland 83'	Attendance: 9,107

17 December 22	West Ham United	1–0	Barnsley	Boleyn Ground
15:00	Diop 6'			Attendance: 34,749

26 December 23	Barnsley	1–3	Blackpool	Oakwell
15:00	Done 18'		M. Phillips 37', 67', 82' (pen.)	Attendance: 11,776

31 December 24	Barnsley	4–1	Leeds United	Oakwell
15:00	Vaz Tê 16', 51', 72'; Davies 61'		Becchio 90+1'	Attendance: 17,499

2 January 25	Doncaster Rovers	2–0	Barnsley	Keepmoat Stadium
15:00	Hayter 14'; Bennett 89'			Attendance: 11,446

14 January 26	Leicester City	1–2	Barnsley	King Power Stadium
15:00	Dyer 15'		Gray 12', 34'	Attendance: 22,116

21 January 27	Barnsley	1–3	Millwall	Oakwell
15:00	McNulty 88'		Henderson 36' (pen.), 39', 75'	Attendance: 9,185

31 January 28	Barnsley	3–2	Derby County	Oakwell
19:45	Done 11'; Gray 23' (pen.); Wiseman 30'		Ward 69'; Carroll 90+4'	Attendance: 10,149

4 February 29	Watford	2–1	Barnsley	Vicarage Road
15:00	Eustace 33', 68'		Golbourne 85'	Attendance: 11,306

14 February 30	Burnley	2–0	Barnsley	Turf Moor
19:45	Rodriguez 3'; Austin 63'			Attendance: 12,355

18 February 31	Barnsley	2–0	Portsmouth	Oakwell
15:00	O'Brien 76'; Done 90'			Attendance: 9,336

21 February 32	Barnsley	1–3	Birmingham City	Oakwell
19:45	Davies 19'		Edwards 8' (o.g.); Fahey 27'; Redmond 78'	Attendance: 9,558

25 February 33	Coventry City	1–0	Barnsley	Ricoh Arena
15:00	Platt 90'			Attendance: 13,928

3 March 34	Barnsley	1–1	Nottingham Forest	Oakwell
15:00	Davies 79'		McCleary 33'	Attendance: 10,550

7 March 35	Middlesbrough	2–0	Barnsley	Riverside Stadium
19:45	Hines 60'; Ogbeche 90+3'			Attendance: 14,745

10 March 36	Southampton	2–0	Barnsley	St Mary's Stadium
15:00	Lallana 36', 53'			Attendance: 24,862

17 March 37	Barnsley	0–4	Reading	Oakwell
15:00			McAnuff 47'; Karacan 49', 65'; Roberts 90'	Attendance: 9,381

20 March 38	Crystal Palace	1–0	Barnsley	Selhurst Park
19:45	Scannell 90+3'			Attendance: 11,853

24 March 39	Barnsley	1–0	Peterborough United	Oakwell
15:00	Cotterill 24'			Attendance: 9,698

31 March 40	Ipswich Town	1–0	Barnsley	Portman Road
15:00	Murphy 48'			Attendance: 20,053

6 April 41	Barnsley	0–4	West Ham United	Oakwell
17:15			Nolan 7'; Maynard 23'; Noble 35'; Vaz Tê 55'	Attendance: 11,151

9 April 42	Blackpool	1–1	Barnsley	Bloomfield Road
15:00	M Phillips 71'		Perkins 47'	Attendance: 13,525

14 April 43	Barnsley	0–1	Cardiff City	Oakwell
15:00			Lawrence 69'	Attendance: 9,122

17 April 44	Hull City	3–1	Barnsley	KC Stadium
19:45	Fryatt 37', 44', 83'		Gray 74'	Attendance: 16,604

21 April 45	Bristol City	2–0	Barnsley	Ashton Gate
15:00	Skuse 11'; Stead 51' (pen.)			Attendance: 18,562

28 April 46	Barnsley	0–0	Brighton & Hove Albion	Oakwell
12:30				Attendance: 10,151

=== FA Cup ===
7 January 2012 3rd round	Barnsley	2–4	Swansea City	Barnsley
15:00 GMT	Vaz Te 29', 65'	report	Rangel 30'; Graham 46', 89'; Dyer 54'	Stadium: Oakwell; Attendance: 7,380; Referee: Attwell

=== League Cup ===
9 August 2011 1st round	Barnsley	0–2	Morecambe	Barnsley
19:45 BST		Report	Carlton 49'; Ellison 86'	Stadium: Oakwell; Attendance: 4,331; Referee: Brown
