= 2009–10 Barnsley F.C. season =

Barnsley
2009–10 season
- Chairman: Patrick Cryne
- Manager: Mark Robins
- Championship: 18th
- FA Cup: Third round
- League Cup: Fourth round
- Top goalscorer: League: Daniel Bogdanovic (7); All: Daniel Bogdanovic (10)
- Highest home attendance: 20,079 vs Newcastle United, 12 December
- Lowest home attendance: 6,470 vs Burnley, 22 September

The 2009–10 season was Barnsley's 101st season in the Football League since joining in 1898.

== Kit and sponsorship ==
Barnsley's kits continue to be designed by Lotto and the main shirt sponsor stays as Barnsley Building Society.

== Season review ==
=== Events ===
- 29 August 2009 – Simon Davey is sacked by Barnsley.
- 9 September 2009 – Mark Robins is confirmed as the new Manager of Barnsley.

=== League ===
Barnsley started the league with a 2–2 draw with Sheffield Wednesday. This was followed by defeats by Coventry City and Preston North End, this kept Barnsley in the relegation zone with just one point. Then a 3–1 defeat to Reading put Barnsley to the bottom of the table and subsequently saw manager Simon Davey relieved of his duties. Their first win of the season came when they beat Derby County 3–2. This was followed by a draw against Swansea City, then a 5–2 loss to Queens Park Rangers. They bounced back with a shocking scoreline as they beat West Bromwich Albion 3–1. Ipswich Town and Doncaster Rovers both suffered defeats against the Tykes. This was followed by a defeat against Nottingham Forest and then the Tykes lost 3–2 against Bristol City. They bounced back with a 2–1 win over Peterborough United at London Road this was followed with a 2–2 draw with Sheffield United. They Tykes then beat Cardiff City with Dickinson grabbing an injury time winner. On 28 November the Tykes took on Plymouth Argyle at Home Park, the Tykes were winning 4–1 before referee Gavin Ward called off the game in the 58th minute. Following this unfortunate event the Tykes took on play-off contenders Blackpool who they beat 2–1, becoming the first side to take all three points from Bloomfield Road. This was followed by three consecutive draws against Scunthorpe United, Newcastle United and Crystal Palace.

After their boxing day clash with Preston North End was postponed due to a frozen pitch at Deepdale, the Tykes took on Middlesbrough, who they beat 2–1, with two second half goals. Coventry City beat Barnsley 3–1 on the first league game of the New Year and then a 2–1 loss to Sheffield Wednesday but quickly bouncing back to back Leicester City.

=== FA Cup ===
Barnsley were knocked out of the cup by Scunthorpe United when they were beaten 1–0.

=== League Cup ===
Round One – Lincoln City 0–1 Barnsley: The Reds travelled to Sincil Bank to face Lincoln City, where Daniel Bogdanovic netted the only goal in a 1–0 win.

Round Two – Reading 1–2 Barnsley: The Reds faced Reading away and two more goals from Bogdanovic either side of Rob Kozluk's own goal put them into the third round.

Round Three – Barnsley 3–2 Burnley: Barnsley entertained Premier League side Burnley. The away side took the lead through Steven Fletcher before Jon Macken's immediate equaliser. Anderson de Silva then drilled in a piledriver to make it 2–1 and Chris Eagles equalised. Hugo Colace headed the winner.

Round Four – Barnsley 0–2 Manchester United: Daniel Welbeck opened the score for Manchester United, Gary Neville was then sent off. Michael Owen put the visitors 2–0 up.

== Squad ==
=== Current squad ===
Note: Flags indicate national team as defined under FIFA eligibility rules; some limited exceptions apply. Players may hold more than one non-FIFA nationality.

No.	Pos.	Nation	Player
1	GK	ENG	Luke Steele
2	DF	ENG	Bobby Hassell
3	DF	ENG	Rob Kozluk
4	DF	JAM	Darren Moore
5	MF	ARG	Hugo Colace
6	DF	ENG	Stephen Foster (Club Captain)
7	FW	CAN	Iain Hume
8	MF	POR	Filipe Teixeira (on loan from West Bromwich Albion)
10	FW	MLT	Daniel Bogdanovic
11	MF	ENG	Martin Devaney
12	GK	ENG	David Preece
15	MF	BRA	Anderson de Silva
17	FW	IRL	Jamil Adam
18	DF	ENG	Jordan Hibbert

No.	Pos.	Nation	Player
19	MF	ENG	Jacob Butterfield
20	FW	ENG	Reuben Noble-Lazarus
21	FW	IRL	Jon Macken
22	DF	ENG	Luke Potter
23	MF	FRA	Mounir El Haimour
24	FW	ENG	Michael Coulson (on loan at Grimsby Town)
25	MF	ENG	Adam Hammill
26	MF	ENG	Simon Heslop
27	FW	SCO	Andy Gray
28	GK	ENG	Tom Rusling
29	DF	ENG	Carl Dickinson (on loan from Stoke City)
30	DF	ENG	Ryan Shotton (on loan from Stoke City)
39	MF	ENG	Nathan Doyle
45	MF	JAM	O'Neil Thompson

=== Squad statistics ===
Last Updated 2 May 2010

No.	Pos	Nat	Player	Total		Championship		FA Cup		League Cup	
No.	Pos	Nat	Player	Apps	Goals	Apps	Goals	Apps	Goals	Apps	Goals
1	GK	(England) ENG	Luke Steele	43	0	39	0	1	0	3	0
2	DF	(England) ENG	Bobby Hassell	26	1	24	1	1	0	1	0
3	DF	(England) ENG	Rob Kozluk	18	0	14	0	0	0	4	0
4	DF	(Jamaica) JAM	Darren Moore	37	1	35	1	0	0	2	0
5	MF	(Argentina) ARG	Hugo Colace	45	8	41	7	1	0	3	1
6	DF	(England) ENG	Stephen Foster	47	2	42	2	1	0	4	0
7	FW	(Canada) CAN	Iain Hume	37	5	35	5	0	0	2	0
8	MF	(Jamaica) JAM	Jamal Campbell-Ryce*	17	0	13	0	1	0	3	0
8	MF	(Portugal) POR	Filipe Teixeira	14	0	14	0	0	0	0	0
9	FW	(Nigeria) NGA	Kayode Odejayi*	7	0	5	0	0	0	2	0
9	FW	(England) ENG	Jay Rodriguez*	6	1	6	1	0	0	0	0
10	FW	(Malta) MLT	Daniel Bogdanovic	33	14	29	11	1	0	3	3
11	MF	(England) ENG	Martin Devaney	7	0	5	0	2	0	0	0
12	GK	(England) ENG	David Preece	7	0	6	0	0	0	1	0
13	DF	(Slovenia) SVN	Suad Filekovič*	0	0	0	0	0	0	0	0
14	MF	(Iceland) ISL	Emil Hallfreðsson*	29	3	26	3	1	0	2	0
15	MF	(Brazil) BRA	Anderson de Silva	36	4	31	3	1	0	4	1
16	FW	(Nigeria) NGA	Onome Sodje*	1	0	1	0	0	0	0	0
16	FW	(England) ENG	Kieran Trippier	3	0	3	0	0	0	0	0
17	FW	(Republic of Ireland) IRL	Jamil Adam	2	0	2	0	0	0	0	0
18	DF	(England) ENG	Jordan Hibbert	0	0	0	0	0	0	0	0
19	MF	(England) ENG	Jacob Butterfield	25	1	20	1	1	0	4	0
20	FW	(England) ENG	Reuben Noble-Lazarus	2	0	2	0	0	0	0	0
21	FW	(Republic of Ireland) IRL	Jon Macken	36	5	31	4	1	0	4	1
22	DF	(England) ENG	Luke Potter	16	0	14	0	0	0	2	0
23	MF	(France) FRA	Mounir El Haimour*	3	0	2	0	0	0	1	0
24	FW	(England) ENG	Michael Coulson	0	0	0	0	0	0	0	0
25	MF	(England) ENG	Adam Hammill	43	4	39	4	1	0	3	0
26	MF	(England) ENG	Simon Heslop	0	0	0	0	0	0	0	0
27	FW	(Scotland) SCO	Andy Gray	31	6	30	6	1	0	0	0
28	GK	(England) ENG	Tom Rusling	0	0	0	0	0	0	0	0
29	DF	(England) ENG	Carl Dickinson	29	1	28	1	1	0	0	0
30	DF	(England) ENG	Ryan Shotton	31	0	30	0	1	0	0	0
31	MF	(England) ENG	Julian Gray*	7	0	5	0	0	0	2	0
32	GK	(Poland) POL	Bartosz Bialkowski*	2	0	2	0	0	0	0	0
39	MF	(England) ENG	Nathan Doyle	34	0	34	0	0	0	0	0
45	MF	(Jamaica) JAM	O'Neil Thompson	2	0	1	0	0	0	1	0

- * Indicates player left club during the season.

=== Disciplinary record ===
Number	Pos	Player	Booked	Sent off (straight red)
30	DF	Ryan Shotton	10	2
5	MF	Hugo Colace	9	0
15	MF	Anderson da Silva	8	0
6	DF	Stephen Foster	8	0
3	DF	Rob Kozluk	3	1
39	MF	Nathan Doyle	7	0
10	FW	Daniel Bogdanovic	5	0
1	GK	Luke Steele	0	1
19	DF	Jacob Butterfield	4	0
29	DF	Carl Dickinson	4	0
25	MF	Adam Hammill	4	0
2	DF	Bobby Hassell	4	0
4	DF	Darren Moore	4	0
22	DF	Luke Potter	4	0
7	FW	Iain Hume	3	0
8	MF	Felipie Teixeira	2	0
27	FW	Andy Gray	1	0
21	FW	Jon Macken	1	0

== Transfers ==
=== Transfers in ===
Date	Player	Club	Fee	Ref.
15 June 2009	Onome Sodje	York City	Free	
20 July 2009	David Preece	OB	Free	
9 August 2009	O'Neil Thompson	Notodden FK	Undisclosed	
10 August 2009	Adam Hammill	Liverpool	Undisclosed	
21 August 2009	Andy Gray	Charlton Athletic	Undisclosed	
16 September 2009	Julian Gray	Unattached	Free	
23 September 2009	Suad Fileković	Unattached	Free	
13 January 2010	Nathan Doyle	Hull City	Free	

=== Transfers out ===
- Brackets indicates player joined club after being released.

Date	Player	Club	Fee	Ref.
15 June 2009	Heinz Müller	FSV Mainz 05	£600,000	
30 June 2009	Dennis Souza	(Al-Sailiya Sport Club)	Free	
30 June 2009	Diego León	(UD Las Palmas)	Free	
30 June 2009	Kyle Letheren	(Plymouth Argyle)	Free	
30 June 2009	Marciano van Homoet	(Willem II)	Free	
23 October 2009	Suad Fileković		Mutual consent	
17 November 2009	Julian Gray		Released	
1 January 2010	Kayode Odejayi	Colchester United	Undisclosed	
19 January 2010	Jamal Campbell-Ryce	Bristol City	Undisclosed	
23 January 2010	Onome Sodje	FK Senica	Free	

=== Loans in ===
Player	Club	Date from	Date until	Ref.
Emil Hallfreðsson	Reggina Calcio	14 August 2009	End of season	
Nathan Doyle	Hull City	18 September 2009	18 December 2009	
Carl Dickinson	Stoke City	23 September 2009	26 December 2009	
Ryan Shotton	Stoke City	23 September 2009	26 December 2009	
Bartosz Bialkowski	Southampton	28 September 2009	5 October 2009	
Carl Dickinson	Stoke City	1 January 2010	End of season	
Ryan Shotton	Stoke City	1 January 2010	End of season	
Jay Rodriguez	Burnley	1 February 2010	1 March 2010	
Filipe Teixeira	West Bromwich Albion	1 February 2010	End of season	
Kieran Trippier	Manchester City	9 February 2010	9 March 2010	

=== Loans out ===
Player	Club	Date from	Date until	Ref.
Kayode Odejayi	Colchester United	16 September 2009	16 December 2009	
Michael Coulson	Chester City	16 October 2009	13 November 2009	
Martin Devaney	Milton Keynes Dons	29 October 2009	29 December 2009	
Simon Heslop	Kettering Town	30 October 2009	30 November 2009	
Michael Coulson	Grimsby Town	19 November 2009	End of season	
Onome Sodje	Oxford United	23 November 2009	1 January 2010	
O'Neil Thompson	Burton Albion	18 January 2010	18 February 2010	

== League table ==
Pos	Team	Pld	W	D	L	GF	GA	GD	Pts
16	Watford	46	14	12	20	61	68	−7	54
17	Preston North End	46	13	15	18	58	73	−15	54
18	Barnsley	46	14	12	20	53	69	−16	54
19	Coventry City	46	13	15	18	47	64	−17	54
20	Scunthorpe United	46	14	10	22	62	84	−22	52

Source: The Football League
Rules for classification: 1) points; 2) goal difference; 3) number of goals scored.

== Fixtures and results ==
=== League ===
Championship match details
Date	Opponent	Venue	Result	Score F–A	Scorers	Attendance	Ref.
8 August 2009	Sheffield Wednesday	A	D	2–2	Butterfield 59', Macken 76'	30,644	
15 August 2009	Coventry City	H	L	0–2		12,552	
18 August 2009	Preston North End	H	L	0–3		11,850	
23 August 2009	Leicester City	A	L	0–1		21,799	
29 August 2009	Reading	H	L	1–3	A. Gray 11'	11,116	
12 September 2009	Watford	A	L	0–1		12,613	
15 September 2009	Derby County	A	W	3–2	Hammill 36', A. Gray 57', Anderson 90+3'	27,609	
19 September 2009	Swansea City	H	D	0–0		11,596	
26 September 2009	Queens Park Rangers	A	L	2–5	Foster 51', A. Gray 56'	12,025	
29 September 2009	West Bromwich Albion	H	W	3–1	Hammill 14', Hume 32' pen., Martis 80' o.g.	12,191	
3 October 2009	Ipswich Town	H	W	2–1	Hume 8', Macken 90+6'	12,224	
17 October 2009	Doncaster Rovers	A	W	1–0	Hammill 74'	12,708	
20 October 2009	Nottingham Forest	A	L	0–1		20,395	
24 October 2009	Bristol City	H	L	2–3	Bogdanović 62', Hammill 90+1'	11,314	
31 October 2009	Peterborough United	A	W	2–1	Bogdanović 26', Macken 39'	8,556	
9 November 2009	Sheffield United	H	D	2–2	Anderson 53', Bogdanović 74'	12,998	
21 November 2009	Cardiff City	H	W	1–0	Dickinson 90+4'	11,903	
5 December 2009	Blackpool	A	W	2–1	Vaughan 85' o.g., A. Gray 88' pen.	8,108	
9 December 2009	Scunthorpe United	H	D	1–1	Colace 53'	11,657	
12 December 2009	Newcastle United	H	D	2–2	Hallfreðsson 52', Hassell 87'	20,079	
19 December 2009	Crystal Palace	A	D	1–1	Bogdanović 19'	14,279	
28 December 2009	Middlesbrough	H	W	2–1	Foster 49', Colace 59'	18,001	
9 January 2010	Coventry City	A	L	1–3	Macken 50'	15,031	
16 January 2010	Sheffield Wednesday	H	L	1–2	Hallfreðsson 7'	17,844	
26 January 2010	Leicester City	H	W	1–0	Colace 77'	12,065	
30 January 2010	Reading	A	L	0–1		15,580	
2 February 2010	Preston North End	A	W	4–1	Anderson 8', Hart 41' o.g., A. Gray 69', Rodriguez 90+4'	12,453	
6 February 2010	Watford	H	W	1–0	Hallfreðsson 55'	11,739	
9 February 2010	Middlesbrough	A	L	1–2	Colace 65'	17,775	
13 February 2010	Plymouth Argyle	H	L	1–3	Colace 45'	11,661	
16 February 2010	Scunthorpe United	A	L	1–2	Bogdanović 78'	5,648	
20 February 2010	Cardiff City	A	W	2–0	Bogdanović 9', 12'	19,753	
27 February 2010	Blackpool	H	W	1–0	Hume 75'	12,347	
6 March 2010	Newcastle United	A	L	1–6	Bogdanović 83'	44,464	
13 March 2010	Crystal Palace	H	D	0–0		11,416	
16 March 2010	Nottingham Forest	H	W	2–1	Bogdanović 12', 65' pen.	13,174	
20 March 2010	Ipswich Town	A	L	0–1		20,558	
23 March 2010	Bristol City	A	L	3–5	Colace 3', Bogdanović 25', A. Gray 81'	13,009	
27 March 2010	Doncaster Rovers	H	L	0–1		14,188	
30 March 2010	Plymouth Argyle	A	D	0–0		7,243	
3 April 2010	Sheffield United	A	D	0–0		24,808	
5 April 2010	Peterborough United	H	D	2–2	Hume 7', 84'	11,290	
10 April 2010	Derby County	H	D	0–0		13,034	
17 April 2010	Swansea City	A	L	1–3	Moore 35'	15,139	
24 April 2010	Queens Park Rangers	H	L	0–1		11,944	
2 May 2010	West Bromwich Albion	A	D	1–1	Colace 59'	25,297	

=== FA Cup ===
FA Cup match details
Round	Date	Opponent	Venue	Result	Score F–A	Scorers	Attendance	Ref.
Third round	2 January 2010	Scunthorpe United	A	L	0–1		5,457	

=== League Cup ===
League Cup match details
Round	Date	Opponent	Venue	Result	Score F–A	Scorers	Attendance	Ref.
First round	11 August 2009	Lincoln City	A	W	1–0	Bogdanović 72'	3,635	
Second round	25 August 2009	Reading	A	W	2–1	Bogdanović 56', 90+5' pen.	5,576	
Third round	22 September 2009	Burnley	H	W	3–2	Macken 22', Anderson 45+7', Colace 75'	6,270	
Fourth round	27 October 2009	Manchester United	H	L	0–2		20,019	
