= Alastair Taylor (footballer) =

English footballer

Personal information
- Full name: Alastair Taylor
- Date of birth: 13 September 1991 (age 35)
- Place of birth: Sheffield, England
- Height: 6 ft 1 in (1.85 m)
- Position: Midfielder

Team information
- Current team: Grantham Town

Youth career
- 2000–2010: Barnsley

Senior career*
Years	Team	Apps	(Gls)
2010–2012	Barnsley	4	(0)
2011	→ Worksop Town (loan)	?	(?)
2012–2014	Alfreton Town	17	(0)
2013	→ Gainsborough Trinity (loan)	4	(1)
2013–2014	→ Gainsborough Trinity (loan)	5	(0)
2014	→ Buxton (loan)	6	(1)
2014–2020	Buxton		
2019	→ Handsworth (dual reg.)		
2020–	Grantham Town	5	(0)
- * Club domestic league appearances and goals as of 21:06, 26 November 2020 (UTC)

Alastair Taylor (born 13 September 1991) is an English footballer who plays as a midfielder for Grantham Town.

== Playing career ==
Taylor joined Barnsley aged 8 and was named Academy Player of the Year in 2009–10. He made his professional debut for the club on 24 April 2010, replacing Nathan Doyle 81 minutes into a 1–0 defeat by Queens Park Rangers at Oakwell. In October 2011, he joined Worksop Town on loan.

Following his release from Barnsley after the 2011–12 season he signed for Conference Premier side Alfreton Town on 9 August 2012. He made his first appearance for Alfreton on 25 August in a 3–1 victory away at Barrow, almost scoring with a 25-yard effort. He made a further 12 appearances over the course of the season and was given a new one-year contract in May 2013.

He made his first appearance of the 2013–14 season as a late substitute in Alfreton's 3–1 defeat to Grimsby Town. With his opportunities limited at Alfreton, Taylor joined Conference North side Gainsborough Trinity on a one-month loan in October 2013. He scored his first senior goal in a 3–2 defeat to Solihull Moors and made a total of four appearances before returning to Alfreton in November. Having started only one of Alfreton's nine league games since his return, Taylor rejoined Gainsborough on loan for a month in late December. After a further five appearances he returned to Alfreton though he soon left the club on loan again, this time joining Northern Premier League Premier Division side Buxton.

== Career statistics ==
As of 4 April 2014.

Club	Season	League			FA Cup		League Cup		Other		Total	
Club	Season	Division	Apps	Goals	Apps	Goals	Apps	Goals	Apps	Goals	Apps	Goals
Barnsley	2009–10	Championship	1	0	0	0	0	0	—		1	0
Barnsley	2010–11	Championship	2	0	0	0	0	0	—		2	0
Barnsley	2011–12	Championship	1	0	0	0	0	0	—		1	0
Barnsley	Total		4	0	0	0	0	0	—		4	0
Alfreton Town	2012–13	Conference Premier	11	0	0	0	—		2 (Note: Appearances in the Derbyshire Senior Cup)	0	13	0
Alfreton Town	2013–14	Conference Premier	6	0	0	0	—		2 (Note: One appearance in the FA Trophy, one appearance in the Derbyshire Senior Cup)	0	8	0
Alfreton Town	Total		17	0	0	0	—		4	0	21	0
Gainsborough Trinity (loan)	2013–14	Conference North	9	1	0	0	—		0	0	9	1
Buxton (loan)	2013–14	Northern Premier	6	1	0	0	—		0	0	6	1
Career total			36	2	0	0	0	0	4	0	40	2

== Honours ==
Barnsley

- Academy Player of the Year: 2009–10
