= Lee Bennett =

English footballer

Personal information
- Date of birth: 19 September 1990 (age 36)
- Place of birth: Barnsley, England
- Position: Striker

Team information
- Current team: Shaw Lane

Senior career*
Years	Team	Apps	(Gls)
2009–2010	Lincoln City	1	(0)
2010	Friska Viljor	9	(2)
2010–2011	Ossett Albion		
2011	Friska Viljor	3	(6)
2011–2012	Frickley Athletic		
2011–2012	Glasshoughton Welfare		
2012–2013	Ossett Town		
2012–2015	Athersley Recreation		
2015	Pontefract Collieries		
2015–2016	Shaw Lane		
2016–2017	Buxton		
2017–	Shaw Lane		
- * Club domestic league appearances and goals

Lee Bennett is an English footballer who plays for Shaw Lane.

== Playing career ==
Bennett began his career with the youth set-up at Ossett Albion whilst attending Barnsley College. In January 2008 he linked up with the academy at Barnsley on extended schoolboy terms before signing a two-year scholarship deal with Lincoln City in December 2008.

Bennett progressed through the youth and reserve teams at Sincil Bank and in August 2009 was awarded with a first team squad number, number 32. He made his Football League debut in the 2–0 victory at Bradford City on 18 August 2009, coming on as a substitute for Stefan Oakes in the 90th minute. After being an unused substitute for the home game against Burton Albion on 22 August 2009, he drifted away from the first team scene and joined Harrogate Town on a work experience basis in December 2009. Inclement weather meant that Bennett failed to make an appearance for Harrogate Town before he returned to Lincoln City where he departed in the summer of 2010 following the completion of his scholarship.

In July 2010 he joined Friska Viljor who play in Sweden's Division 3 Mellersta Norrland, marking his debut by scoring after 12 minutes in the club's 3–2 DM Herrar cup victory over Sollefteå GIF on 22 July 2010. He would play nine Division 3 Mellersta Norrland games, scoring two goals and 2 DM Herrar cup ties, scoring once, in the 2010 Swedish season before returning to England and joining Ossett Albion in October 2010. He returned to Sweden and Friska Viljor for the start of the 2011 Swedish season and scored six goals in the first three Division 3 Mellersta Norrland games, including a hat-trick in the 6–3 victory at Sandviks IK on 7 May 2011, before departing the club and returning to England. In July 2011 he underwent a trial at Mansfield Town, appearing in the club's 1–1 friendly at Rainworth Miners Welfare on 9 July 2011.

In August 2011 he signed for Frickley Athletic before moving on to Glasshoughton Welfare. In July 2012, he was one of six players to follow manager Craig Elliott from Glasshoughton to Ossett Town. He moved on to join Athersley Recreation, making a goalscoring debut in the club's Northern Counties East League Division One 3–0 home victory over Grimsby Borough on 13 October 2012. At the end of February 2015 he moved on to join Pontefract Collieries, debuting in the club's Northern Counties East League Division One 2–0 home victory over Yorkshire Amateur on 28 February 2015. He scored his first goal for the club in their 3–1 home victory over Shirebrook Town on 11 March 2015.

He moved on at the end of the season to join Shaw Lane Aquaforce, scoring on his debut in a 2-1 Northern Premier League First Division South victory at Tividale on 15 August 2015. On 31 May 2016, Buxton announced that Bennett had agreed to join them for the 2016–17 season.

In 2017 Bennett re-joined Shaw Lane from Buxton FC.

== Personal life ==
His brother Steven Bennett played in the EFL Championship for their hometown club Barnsley. The two played together at Ossett Town and Athersley Recreation.
