= Bobby Hassell =

English footballer (born 1980)

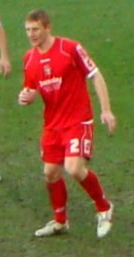
- Hassell playing for Barnsley

Personal information
- Full name: Robert John Francis Hassell
- Date of birth: 4 June 1980 (age 46)
- Place of birth: Derby, England
- Position: Defender

Youth career
- ?–1997: Mansfield Town

Senior career*
Years	Team	Apps	(Gls)
1997–2004	Mansfield Town	164	(3)
2004–2014	Barnsley	270	(8)
2015	Bharat FC	18	(0)
Total		452	(11)
- * Club domestic league appearances and goals

Robert John Francis Hassell (born 4 June 1980) is an English former footballer who played for Mansfield Town, Barnsley and Bharat FC in I-League as a defender. He is an Academy Manager at Barnsley.

== Career ==
=== Mansfield ===
Born in Derby, Derbyshire, Hassell graduated from the youth ranks at Mansfield Town. Showing his versatility from the start of his career, Hassell played in both the centre of defence and at right-back. After losing the 2003–04 Division Three Play-Off Final to Huddersfield Town, Hassell failed to negotiate a new contract with Mansfield.

=== Barnsley ===
Barnsley boss Paul Hart brought Hassell to Oakwell as part of a rebuilding process in the summer of 2004, completing his move on 1 July. Despite a slow start, Hassell made 43 appearances throughout the 2004–05 campaign and gradually became a fans' favourite. He missed parts of the 2005–06 campaign through injury but played a key role when fit in helping Barnsley gain promotion from League One. Unlike two years' previously, he was on the winning side at the Millennium Stadium as Barnsley triumphed over Swansea City on penalties in the Play-Off Final.

Hassell then enjoyed another fine campaign during 2006–07, again in the running for all the end of season awards, clocking up 42 appearances and netting two goals. In the following season, he showed his versatility to perform heroically during Barnsley's run to the semi-finals of the FA Cup. He made multiple last ditch tackles and goal-line clearances whilst playing at right-back in a 2–1 win over Liverpool at Anfield, and was outstanding in an unfamiliar central midfield position as Chelsea were beaten 1–0 at Oakwell.

He was named as Barnsley's Players' Player of the Year, Fans Player of the Year and Disabled Supporters' Player of the Year for the 2008–09 season.

When Mark Robins was appointed Barnsley manager following the start of the 2009–10 season, Hassell initially dropped out of the team, yet soon found his way back in due to consistent performances and a high work rate. Hassell was made Barnsley vice-captain in the summer of 2010 when Robins handed the captaincy to Jason Shackell. The 2010–11 season was another successful one for Hassell who made his 200th league start for Barnsley against Millwall in January.

Keith Hill named Hassell as club captain for the 2011–12 season. Hassell had to go in goal in a League Cup tie with Rochdale on 11 August 2012 after Ben Alnwick was sent off and Barnsley had already used all 3 of their substitutions.

In his final years as a Barnsley player, Hassell found games harder to come by but nevertheless always impressed when called upon. He was released by the club after ten years in May 2014. A year later in July 2015, Hassell was rewarded for his service to Barnsley with a testimonial match at Oakwell against Mansfield Town. The home side, featuring Hassell's former teammates from the 2006 promotion winning team, won the match 4–3. He is regarded as a club legend at Barnsley.

=== Bharat ===
In December 2014, Bobby signed for new I-League team Bharat. Hassell played the first ever match for the club as the I-League debutants held Dempo to a goalless draw.

=== Return to Barnsley ===
After leaving India, Hassell took up a position as Head of Recruitment for Barnsley's Academy in 2015. He now serves as Academy Manager at Oakwell.

== Personal life ==
Hassell is a committed Christian and he credits his faith as helping him overcome his temper and giving him an abundant sense of peace.

== Career statistics ==
Appearances and goals by club, season and competition
Club	Season	League			FA Cup		League Cup		Other		Total	
Club	Season	Division	Apps	Goals	Apps	Goals	Apps	Goals	Apps	Goals	Apps	Goals
Mansfield Town	1997–98	Third Division	10	0	0	0	0	0	0	0	10	0
Mansfield Town	1998–99	Third Division	3	0	0	0	0	0	0	0	3	0
Mansfield Town	1999–2000	Third Division	11	1	1	0	2	0	0	0	14	1
Mansfield Town	2000–01	Third Division	40	1	1	0	3	0	0	0	44	1
Mansfield Town	2001–02	Third Division	43	1	3	0	1	0	1 (Note: Appearance(s) in Football League Trophy)	0	48	1
Mansfield Town	2002–03	Second Division	20	0	0	0	0	0	0	0	20	0
Mansfield Town	2003–04	Third Division	37	0	4	0	1	0	0	0	42	0
Mansfield Town	Total		164	3	9	0	7	0	1	0	181	3
Barnsley	2004–05	League One	39	0	1	0	2	0	1 (Note: Appearances in Football League Trophy)	0	43	0
Barnsley	2005–06	League One	31	2	4	0	0	0	1	0	36	2
Barnsley	2006–07	Championship	39	2	2	0	1	0	—		42	2
Barnsley	2007–08	Championship	20	0	5	0	0	0	—		25	0
Barnsley	2008–09	Championship	40	0	1	0	1	0	—		42	0
Barnsley	2009–10	Championship	24	2	1	0	1	0	—		26	2
Barnsley	2010–11	Championship	37	1	1	0	1	0	—		39	1
Barnsley	2011–12	Championship	19	0	1	0	1	0	—		21	0
Barnsley	2012–13	Championship	17	1	2	0	2	1	—		21	2
Barnsley	2013–14	Championship	4	0	0	0	0	0	—		4	0
Barnsley	Total		270	8	18	0	9	1	2	0	299	9
Bharat FC	2015	I-League	18	0	— (Note: Although Bharat FC is a part of extending 2015 I-League, it will not play in 2014 Federation Cup)		—		—		18	0
Career total			452	11	27	0	16	1	3	0	498	12

== Honours ==
Barnsley

- Football League One play-offs: 2006

Individual

- Barnsley Player of the Year: 2008–09
