= Martin Devaney =

Footballer (born 1980)

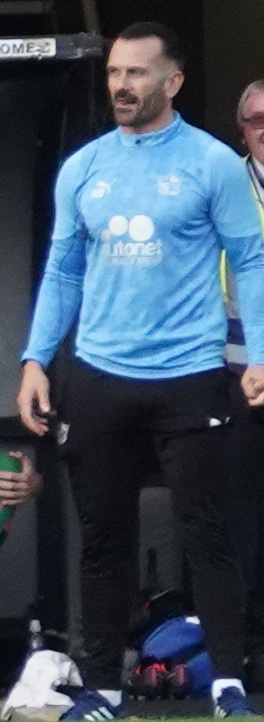
- Devaney at Port Vale in 2025

Personal information
- Full name: Martin Thomas Devaney
- Date of birth: 1 June 1980 (age 46)
- Place of birth: Cheltenham, England
- Height: 1.78 m (5 ft 10 in)
- Position: Winger

Youth career
- Charlton Rovers
- Birmingham City
- 1997–1999: Coventry City

Senior career*
Years	Team	Apps	(Gls)
1999–2005	Cheltenham Town	202	(38)
2005	Watford	0	(0)
2005–2011	Barnsley	156	(15)
2009	→ Milton Keynes Dons (loan)	5	(0)
2010	→ Walsall (loan)	4	(1)
2011–2012	Tranmere Rovers	20	(2)
2012	Bohemians	1	(1)
2013	Kidderminster Harriers	8	(1)
2013–2014	Hyde United	11	(0)
2014	Worcester City	12	(1)
Total		419	(59)

International career
- Republic of Ireland U16

Managerial career
- 2022: Barnsley (caretaker)
- 2024: Barnsley (caretaker)
- * Club domestic league appearances and goals

Martin Thomas Devaney (born 1 June 1980) is a football coach and former professional player.

Devaney, born in England to Irish parents, played as a right-sided winger. He spent time with Birmingham City and Coventry City, before joining his hometown club, Cheltenham Town, in 1999. He was promoted out of the Third Division via the play-offs in 2002 and was named as the club's Player of the Year in 2003. He scored 43 goals in 227 league and cup appearances across six seasons. He joined Barnsley via Watford in 2005. He was promoted out of League One via the play-offs in 2006. He spent time on loan at Milton Keynes Dons and Walsall. He spent a total of six seasons at Barnsley, scoring 18 goals in 176 matches. He then saw out his playing career with spells at Tranmere Rovers, Bohemians (Ireland), Kidderminster Harriers, Hyde United and Worcester City.

He rejoined Barnsley as a coach after a spell with Bradford City in 2015, serving as caretaker manager in 2022 and again in 2024. He left Barnsley in 2025 and went on to coach at Port Vale.

== Early and personal life ==
Martin Thomas Devaney was born on 1 June 1980 in Cheltenham, England. His mother came from the Foxrock area on the southside of Dublin, Ireland and his father came from Ballina, County Mayo, Ireland. He hoped to represent the Republic of Ireland national football team, though never was called up due to the side's strength in the 2000s. He did, though, represent Ireland at under-16 level. He attended Balcarras School in Charlton Kings, Cheltenham and played youth-team football for Charlton Rovers.

His son, Jacob, was called up to the Republic of Ireland U19 squad in September 2024 after coming through the Manchester United Academy.

== Playing career ==
=== Cheltenham Town ===
Devaney spent time on the books of Birmingham City and Coventry City, before he signed for his hometown club, Football League newcomers Cheltenham Town, in 1999. He made his debut in the club's first-ever Football League game, coming on as a substitute in a 2–0 defeat to Rochdale at Whaddon Road. He ended the 1999–2000 season with six goals in 25 Third Division appearances. On 23 September 2000, Devaney scored the club's first Football League hat-trick during a 5–2 home win over Plymouth Argyle. He scored ten goals in 38 games throughout the 2000–01 campaign. He scored three goals from 32 games in the 2001–02 promotion-winning season. He scored the opening goal of the play-off final victory over Rushden & Diamonds at the Millennium Stadium and was named as man of the match.

He was named the club's Player of the Year for the 2002–03 season, having claimed seven goals in 44 matches. The Robins were unable to survive in the Second Division, however, with manager Graham Allner sacked and his replacement Bobby Gould unable to prevent relegation from being confirmed with a final day defeat at Notts County. Devaney scored six goals in 44 games of the 2003–04 season. He scored a career-high of 11 goals in 42 matches in the 2004–05 campaign, with Cheltenham finishing mid-table in the renamed League Two. Manager John Ward placed him on the transfer list after he rejected the club's offer of a new contract in 2004. He was subsequently linked with a move to Yeovil Town. A move to an unnamed Championship club, speculated to be Burnley as they were managed by former Cheltenham boss Steve Cotterill, broke down in March 2005. By the time of his departure, he was the club's record Football League scorer until Julian Alsop exceeded his tally in the 2009–10 campaign.

=== Barnsley ===
Devaney rejected an offer of a new contract at Cheltenham in July 2005 to instead join Championship club Watford on a one-year deal. However, Aidy Boothroyd could not find a place in his squad for the winger, and he was allowed to join Barnsley of League One on 24 August. In his first season at Oakwell, he helped the club to promotion, beating Swansea City on penalties in the play-off final. He ended the 2005–06 campaign with eight goals in 48 games for Andy Ritchie's Tykes.

He scored six goals in 44 appearances in the 2006–07 campaign. Manager Simon Davey signed Jamal Campbell-Ryce in August 2007, though Devaney pressed his case to regain his place in the starting 11 by scoring off the bench against Southampton and Bristol City in the following two months. He played in victories against Liverpool and Chelsea in consecutive rounds to reach the FA Cup semi-finals in the 2007–08 season. They were beaten by Cardiff City in the semi-finals, which he said "was like our final". He finished the 2007–08 season with four goals in 39 games. Blackpool had a £150,000 bid for the player accepted in June 2008, though Davey said that this was due to a clause in his contract and that "we are not in the business of letting our players go on the cheap". He was also linked with a move to Cardiff City, with a figure of £250,000 quoted as being necessary to persuade Barnsley to let him go.

Devaney made 27 appearances without finding the net in the 2008–09 season. On 29 October 2009, Devaney joined League One club Milton Keynes Dons on a month-long emergency loan. He scored his first goal for the Dons in an FA Cup encounter with Exeter City, coming off the bench to score a header from outside of the box to inspire a 4–3 victory. Manager Paul Ince extended the loan into a second month. He played seven games at Stadium MK and also featured 11 times for Barnsley in the 2009–10 campaign. Manager Mark Robins made both Devaney and Liam Dickinson available for loan early in the 2010–11 campaign. On 7 October 2010, Devaney joined League One bottom club Walsall on an initial one-month loan deal. He impressed in his first two appearances for the Saddlers, claiming an assist and a goal. The loan was extended into a second month as manager Chris Hutchings felt he was enjoying himself at the Bescot Stadium despite Walsall's poor run of form. Having played seven games for Barnsley in 2010–11, he was one of five players released at the end of the season.

=== Later career ===
On 2 August 2011, Devaney signed a one-year contract with Tranmere Rovers as manager Les Parry felt that he would add creativity to the squad. He made his debut on the first day of the 2011–12 season, starting against Chesterfield. He said he had more to offer as he regained fitness after being without a club for pre-season and that Rovers were hoping for a top eight finish in League One. However, he missed September to November with a hamstring injury, though said he was inspired by the team's good form in his absence. Tranmere's early season form fell away and Parry was sacked in March. Devaney was out for a long-term injury under Parry's replacement Ronnie Moore. He departed Prenton Park after being released at the end of the 2011–12 season.

On 11 February 2013, Devaney joined Conference National club Kidderminster Harriers on a deal until the end of the 2012–13 season as manager Steve Burr felt his experience would be "invaluable". He scored one goal at Aggborough, in a 4–0 victory over Stockport County. Harriers qualified for the play-offs, losing to Wrexham at the semi-final stage. On 24 September 2013, he joined Hyde United, who were bottom of the Conference National after Scott McNiven's Tigers failed to win in their opening ten league games of the 2013–14 campaign. He played 11 games at Ewen Fields, of which two were league starts. He was linked with a move to Shaw Lane in July 2015, by which stage he was coaching full-time at Bradford City.

== Style of play ==
Devaney was a right-sided winger who could beat the opposition full-back and deliver a good cross. He described himself as "a tricky and quick player who has a will-to-win".

== Coaching career ==
=== Barnsley ===
Devaney joined the coaching staff at Barnsley in 2015 and was put in charge of the Under-23s in February 2018 after stepping up from leading the Under-18s. He was linked with the vacant manager's job at Morecambe in October 2019.

On 24 April 2022, following the sacking of Poya Asbaghi, Devaney was appointed as caretaker manager for the rest of the season. With relegation from the Championship already confirmed, Barnsley lost their final three games. Former teammate Michael Duff was appointed as the club's new manager in July and he named Devaney as part of his backroom staff. He was named as an assistant head coach by new head coach Neill Collins in July 2023.

On 22 April 2024, Devaney was once again appointed caretaker manager of Barnsley after Collins was sacked. The club had one game left to play of the 2023–24 campaign, needing victory to secure a place in the League One play-offs. The match was drawn, though Barnsley qualified regardless, owing to results elsewhere going their way. The first leg of the semi-final was a 3–1 home defeat to Bolton Wanderers and they were eliminated from the play-offs despite going on to win the away leg. He returned to an assistant role under new head coach Darrell Clarke in May 2024. Conor Hourihane was put in caretaker charge when Clarke was sacked in March 2025, with Devaney in an assistant role. Hourihane was named as Clarke's permanent successor the following month and Devaney subsequently left the club.

=== Port Vale ===
Devaney joined Port Vale as a first-team coach in July 2025, where he would work under former Barnsley teammate Darren Moore. Devaney departed the club in January 2026, shortly after Moore left the club.

== Career statistics ==
=== Playing ===
Appearances and goals by club, season and competition
Club	Season	League			FA Cup		League Cup		Other		Total	
Club	Season	Division	Apps	Goals	Apps	Goals	Apps	Goals	Apps	Goals	Apps	Goals
Cheltenham Town	1999–2000	Third Division	25	6	0	0	2	0	0	0	27	6
Cheltenham Town	2000–01	Third Division	34	10	2	0	1	0	1 (Note: Appearance(s) in Football League Trophy)	0	38	10
Cheltenham Town	2001–02	Third Division	25	1	2	1	1	0	4 (Note: 1 appearance in Football League Trophy, 3 appearances and 1 goals in play-offs)	1	32	3
Cheltenham Town	2002–03	Second Division	40	6	2	1	0	0	2	0	44	7
Cheltenham Town	2003–04	Third Division	40	5	2	0	1	0	1	1	44	6
Cheltenham Town	2004–05	League Two	38	10	1	0	1	1	2	0	42	11
Cheltenham Town	Total		202	38	9	2	6	1	10	2	227	43
Watford	2005–06	Championship	0	0	—		0	0	—		0	0
Barnsley	2005–06	League One	38	6	5	2	1	0	4 (Note: 1 appearance in Football League Trophy, 3 appearances in play-offs)	0	48	8
Barnsley	2006–07	Championship	41	5	2	0	1	1	—		44	6
Barnsley	2007–08	Championship	34	4	4	0	1	0	—		39	4
Barnsley	2008–09	Championship	26	0	0	0	1	0	—		27	0
Barnsley	2009–10	Championship	11	0	0	0	0	0	—		11	0
Barnsley	2010–11	Championship	6	0	0	0	1	0	—		7	0
Barnsley	Total		156	15	11	2	5	1	4	0	176	18
Milton Keynes Dons (loan)	2009–10	League One	5	0	2	1	—		0	0	7	1
Walsall (loan)	2010–11	League One	4	1	1	0	—		—		5	1
Tranmere Rovers	2011–12	League One	20	2	1	0	1	0	1	0	23	2
Bohemians	2012	LOI Premier Division	1	1	—		—		—		1	1
Kidderminster Harriers	2012–13	Conference National	8	1	—		—		2 (Note: Appearance(s) in play-offs)	0	10	1
Hyde United	2013–14	Conference National	11	0	0	0	—		0	0	11	0
Worcester City	2013–14	Conference North	12	1	0	0	—		0	0	12	1
Career total			419	59	24	5	12	2	17	2	472	68

=== Managerial ===
Managerial record by team and tenure
Team	From	To	Record					Ref.
Team	From	To	P	W	D	L	Win %	Ref.
Barnsley (caretaker)	25 April 2022	14 June 2022	3	0	0	3	0.00	
Barnsley (caretaker)	25 April 2024	23 May 2024	3	1	1	1	33.33	
Total			6	1	1	4	16.67	

== Honours ==
Cheltenham Town

- Football League Third Division play-offs: 2002

Barnsley

- Football League One play-offs: 2006

Individual

- Cheltenham Town Player of the Year: 2002–03
