= Suad Fileković =

Slovenian footballer (born 1978)

Personal information
- Date of birth: 16 September 1978 (age 48)
- Place of birth: Ljubljana, SFR Yugoslavia
- Height: 1.90 m (6 ft 3 in)
- Position: Full-back

Youth career
- Olimpija

Senior career*
Years	Team	Apps	(Gls)
1997–1999	Olimpija	58	(2)
1999–2003	Maribor	124	(5)
2003–2004	Hajduk Split	7	(1)
2005	Ergotelis	10	(0)
2005–2006	Mouscron	19	(2)
2006–2007	Krylia Sovetov	8	(0)
2007–2009	Maribor	29	(1)
2009	Barnsley	0	(0)
2009–2010	Maribor	12	(0)
2011	Hapoel Ashkelon	14	(1)
2012	Železničar Maribor	12	(8)
2012–2013	FC Großklein	12	(0)
2013–2014	Malečnik	17	(1)
Total		322	(21)

International career
1994–1995	Slovenia U16	4	(0)
1997	Slovenia U18	1	(0)
1998	Slovenia U20	3	(0)
1998–1999	Slovenia U21	9	(0)
2002–2009	Slovenia	14	(0)
- * Club domestic league appearances and goals

Suad Fileković (born 16 September 1978) is a Slovenian retired professional footballer.

== Club career ==
Fileković played for Olimpija and Maribor in the Slovenian PrvaLiga, Hajduk Split in the Croatian Prva HNL, Ergotelis in the Super League Greece, Mouscron in Belgium, and Krylia Sovetov in the Russian Premier League. Filekovič initially joined English Football League Championship club Barnsley on a week-long trial before signing a contract on 18 September 2009 until January 2010. He left the club by mutual consent on 23 October 2009. As the contract with Barnsley expired, Fileković eventually returned to his former club Maribor in January 2010, where he stayed until the end of the 2009–10 season. After being without a club since July 2010, he signed for Israeli side Hapoel Ashkelon on 22 January 2011. He played for FC Großklein in the Austrian lower leagues during the 2012–13 season.

== International career ==
Fileković made his debut for Slovenia on 22 August 2002 in a friendly match against Italy, which Slovenia won 1–0. Overall, he made 14 appearances for the team between 2002 and 2009.
