= Nathan Doyle =

English association football player

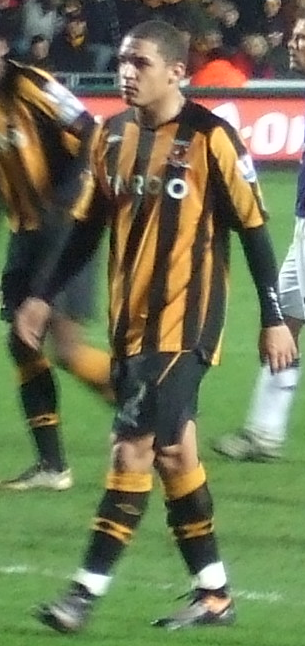
- Doyle playing for Hull City in 2009

Personal information
- Full name: Nathan Luke Robert Doyle
- Date of birth: 12 January 1987 (age 39)
- Place of birth: Derby, England
- Height: 5 ft 11 in (1.80 m)
- Positions: Defender; midfielder

Youth career
- –2003: Derby County

Senior career*
Years	Team	Apps	(Gls)
2003–2007	Derby County	9	(0)
2006	→ Notts County (loan)	12	(0)
2006–2007	→ Bradford City (loan)	28	(0)
2007–2010	Hull City	5	(0)
2009	→ Barnsley (loan)	11	(0)
2010–2012	Barnsley	87	(2)
2011	→ Preston North End (loan)	5	(0)
2012–2014	Bradford City	76	(2)
2014–2017	Luton Town	38	(0)
2018–2019	Bridlington Town		
2019–2020	East Hull		
Total		271	(4)

International career
2001–2002	England U16	10	(0)
2003–2004	England U17	18	(0)
2004–2005	England U18	2	(0)
2006	England U19	1	(0)

Managerial career
- 2020: East Hull
- * Club domestic league appearances and goals as of 23:33, 8 November 2018 (UTC)

Nathan Luke Robert Doyle (born 12 January 1987) is an English former professional footballer who played as a defender or a midfielder. He has represented England at under-16, under-17, under-18 and under-19 levels.

== Career ==
=== Derby County ===
Born in Derby, Derbyshire, Doyle started his career playing for Noel-Baker School. He made his professional debut for Derby County on 1 November 2003, aged 16, in a 3–0 defeat away to Preston North End.

==== Notts County (loan) ====
On 24 February 2006, Doyle signed for League Two club Notts County on a one-month loan deal. He made his debut for the club the next day in a 2–1 defeat away to Lincoln City. After making four appearances during his initial one-month spell, Doyle's loan was extended to the end of the season. Doyle returned to Derby in May 2006, having made 12 appearances during his time at Notts County.

==== Bradford City (loan) ====
Doyle signed a three-month loan deal with League One club Bradford City on 2 August 2006. He made his debut for the club in a 1–0 defeat away to Nottingham Forest on the opening day of the 2006–07 season. Doyle made a quick impression, prompting Bradford to consider taking up the option of extending his loan to six months or a season-long loan. Bradford manager Colin Todd was convinced that Doyle's loan would be extended, promising fans that he would stay into the new year. This was confirmed later that week, keeping Doyle at the club until 1 January 2007.

In the West Yorkshire derby between Bradford and Huddersfield Town on 7 October 2006 which resulted in a 1–0 defeat, Doyle had plastic bottles thrown at him and was accused of cheating by the Huddersfield fans after Danny Adams was sent off for a challenge on him, an accusation Doyle denied.

Towards the end of his loan spell, Doyle expressed a desire to remain at the club and hoped Bradford could reach an agreement with Derby to extend his stay. However, this appeared to be in jeopardy after it was believed he had sustained a knee ligament injury during a 1–0 defeat at home to Doncaster Rovers on 26 December 2006, potentially ruling him out for up to three months. A hospital scan proved otherwise and Doyle was able to return to training later that week. At the same time, manager Colin Todd claimed Doyle's loan had been extended for the rest of the season. However, it emerged this was not the case and the deal was an emergency one-month loan until 3 February 2007. Todd expected an extension until the end of the season to be completed before the end of the transfer window after an agreement with Derby manager Billy Davies. A turn of events scuppered any chance of a deal after Hull City made a deadline day bid for Doyle, resulting in him being recalled by Derby, having made 33 appearances in all competitions during his time at Bradford City. Despite leaving the club in January, Doyle was named Bradford City Player of the Year, voted for by the club's supporters.

=== Hull City ===
Doyle signed a two-and-a-half-year contract with Hull City on 31 January 2007 for a nominal fee. He made his debut for the club in a 2–1 defeat at home to Plymouth Argyle on the final day of the 2006–07 season. Doyle's first-team opportunities were limited in 2007–08, in which he made one appearance in the League Cup, FA Cup and Championship respectively. However, Hull's successful season earned the club a place in the Championship play-offs, with Doyle featuring in their play-off semi-final second leg at home to Watford, in which he scored his first professional goal in a 4–1 victory on 14 May 2008. Hull played Bristol City at Wembley Stadium on 24 May, where the team achieved a 1–0 victory and promotion to the Premier League for the first time in their history, in which Doyle was an unused substitute.

Doyle eventually made his Premier League debut the following season on 26 December 2008, when he came on as a substitute during a 5–1 defeat away to Manchester City. He made two further Premier League appearances, both of which Doyle was named in the starting lineup and made seven appearances in all competitions. Doyle made one League Cup appearance in 2009–10.

=== Barnsley ===
Doyle joined Championship club Barnsley on a three-month emergency loan deal on 18 September 2009. He made his debut the following day, coming on as a substitute for Jacob Butterfield in a 0–0 draw with Swansea City. Doyle made 11 appearances during his initial loan spell, before signing a permanent two-and-a-half-year contract with the club on a free transfer on 13 January 2010. He went on to make 34 appearances for Barnsley in 2009–10.

Doyle scored his first goal for Barnsley in a 3–1 win at home to Nottingham Forest on 16 October 2010. He completed the 2010–11 season having made 45 appearances and scored two goals in all competitions. Doyle followed up with a further 21 appearances in 2011–12, but was released by Barnsley at the end of the season.

==== Preston North End (loan) ====
On 24 November 2011, Doyle joined League One club Preston North End on loan until 2 January 2012. He made his debut for the club two days later in a 1–0 defeat away to Bury. Doyle made four further league appearances and one Football League Trophy appearance during his loan spell.

=== Return to Bradford City ===
On 4 August 2012, Doyle returned to former loan club Bradford City on a one-year contract. He made his second debut for Bradford in their game away at League One club Notts County in the League Cup first round one week later. On 30 October, Doyle helped Bradford into the quarter-finals of the League Cup by scoring his penalty in their penalty shoot-out victory over Wigan Athletic, after the game had finished 0–0 after extra time. Doyle was shown a red card in a 3–3 draw with Bristol Rovers on 24 November for allegedly kicking Seanan Clucas, resulting in a three-match ban. However, Bradford manager Phil Parkinson appealed the decision, which was overturned the following day by an independent Football Association panel. Doyle scored his first goals for the club on 12 February 2013, scoring twice in a 3–0 win away at Wycombe Wanderers. He was named in the starting lineup for the 2013 Football League Cup final against Swansea City at Wembley Stadium on 24 February 2013, resulting in a 5–0 defeat. Bradford went on to secure a place in the League Two play-offs after a 1–0 win at home to Burton Albion on 20 April. Doyle played in both semi-final legs against Burton Albion, which Bradford won 5–4 on aggregate. Bradford played Northampton Town in the 2013 Football League Two play-off final on 18 May, their second appearance at Wembley Stadium of the season and won the match 3–0, thereby earning promotion to League One. During the match, Doyle assisted Rory McArdle for Bradford's second goal with a cross. Following the end of the season, Doyle signed a new one-year contract with Bradford on 3 July. Doyle made 39 league appearances on Bradford's return to League One in 2013–14, but was released on 9 June 2014 after becoming surplus to requirements, having made 94 appearances in two seasons with the club.

=== Luton Town ===
Doyle signed a one-year contract at League Two club Luton Town on 11 September 2014, receiving the squad number 26. He made his debut for the club in a 2–0 win at home to Oxford United on 27 September. Doyle went on to make 31 appearances in all competitions in 2014–15. His performances in midfield led to him being named Luton Town Player of the Season, voted for by the club's supporters. On 10 April 2015, Doyle signed a two-year contract extension with Luton to keep him at the club until 2017.

Doyle played in the first four matches of 2015–16, but sustained a muscle injury in the latter, a 1–0 defeat at home to Bristol Rovers on 18 August 2015. He returned to first-team football as a 78th-minute substitute for Paddy McCourt in a 3–1 win away to Morecambe on 29 September. Doyle signed a further contract extension with Luton on 10 November to keep him at the club until the summer of 2018. He struggled with injuries in November and December, firstly sustaining an ankle injury in early November, followed by a knee injury in early December. The latter required a visit to a specialist and a subsequent operation, ruling him out for six weeks. Doyle returned to training in March 2016, but made no further appearances during the season. Doyle suffered an Achilles tendon rupture in his first pre-season training session prior to the 2016–17 season, resulting in a long spell on the sidelines. He left Luton after his contract was cancelled by mutual consent on 31 January 2017.

=== Later career ===
Doyle signed for Northern Counties East League Premier Division club Bridlington Town in May 2018. He signed for East Hull in October 2019.

== Coaching career ==
Doyle was appointed manager of East Hull in 2020. He resigned in December the same year.

== Personal life ==
On 22 September 2010, Derbyshire Police said Doyle had been arrested on suspicion of possessing cocaine. On 28 October, it was confirmed that Doyle would not be charged.

== Career statistics ==
As of match played 4 August 2018

Appearances and goals by club, season and competition
Club	Season	League			FA Cup		League Cup		Other		Total	
Club	Season	Division	Apps	Goals	Apps	Goals	Apps	Goals	Apps	Goals	Apps	Goals
Derby County	2003–04	First Division	2	0	0	0	0	0	—		2	0
Derby County	2004–05	Championship	3	0	1	0	0	0	—		4	0
Derby County	2005–06	Championship	4	0	0	0	0	0	—		4	0
Derby County	Total		9	0	1	0	0	0	—		10	0
Notts County (loan)	2005–06	League Two	12	0	—		—		—		12	0
Bradford City (loan)	2006–07	League One	28	0	3	0	1	0	1 (Note: Appearance in Football League Trophy)	0	33	0
Hull City	2006–07	Championship	1	0	—		—		—		1	0
Hull City	2007–08	Championship	1	0	1	0	1	0	2 (Note: Appearances in Championship play-offs)	1	5	1
Hull City	2008–09	Premier League	3	0	3	0	1	0	—		7	0
Hull City	2009–10	Premier League	0	0	—		1	0	—		1	0
Hull City	Total		5	0	4	0	3	0	2	1	14	1
Barnsley	2009–10	Championship	34	0	0	0	—		—		34	0
Barnsley	2010–11	Championship	43	2	1	0	1	0	—		45	2
Barnsley	2011–12	Championship	21	0	0	0	0	0	—		21	0
Barnsley	Total		98	2	1	0	1	0	—		100	2
Preston North End (loan)	2011–12	League One	5	0	—		—		1	0	6	0
Bradford City	2012–13	League Two	37	2	2	0	7	0	6 (Note: Three appearances in Football League Trophy, three in League Two play-offs)	0	52	2
Bradford City	2013–14	League One	39	0	1	0	1	0	1	0	42	0
Bradford City	Total		76	2	3	0	8	0	7	0	94	2
Luton Town	2014–15	League Two	27	0	3	0	0	0	1	0	31	0
Luton Town	2015–16	League Two	11	0	1	0	1	0	1	0	14	0
Luton Town	2016–17	League Two	0	0	0	0	0	0	0	0	0	0
Luton Town	Total		38	0	4	0	1	0	2	0	45	0
Bridlington Town	2018–19	Northern Counties East League Premier Division	1	0	0	0	—		0	0	1	0
Career total			272	4	16	0	14	0	13	1	315	5

== Honours ==
Hull City

- Football League Championship play-offs: 2008

Bradford City

- Football League Two play-offs: 2013
- Football League Cup runner-up: 2012–13

Individual

- Bradford City Player of the Year: 2006–07
- Luton Town Player of the Season: 2014–15
