= Michael Coulson (footballer) =

English footballer (born 1988)

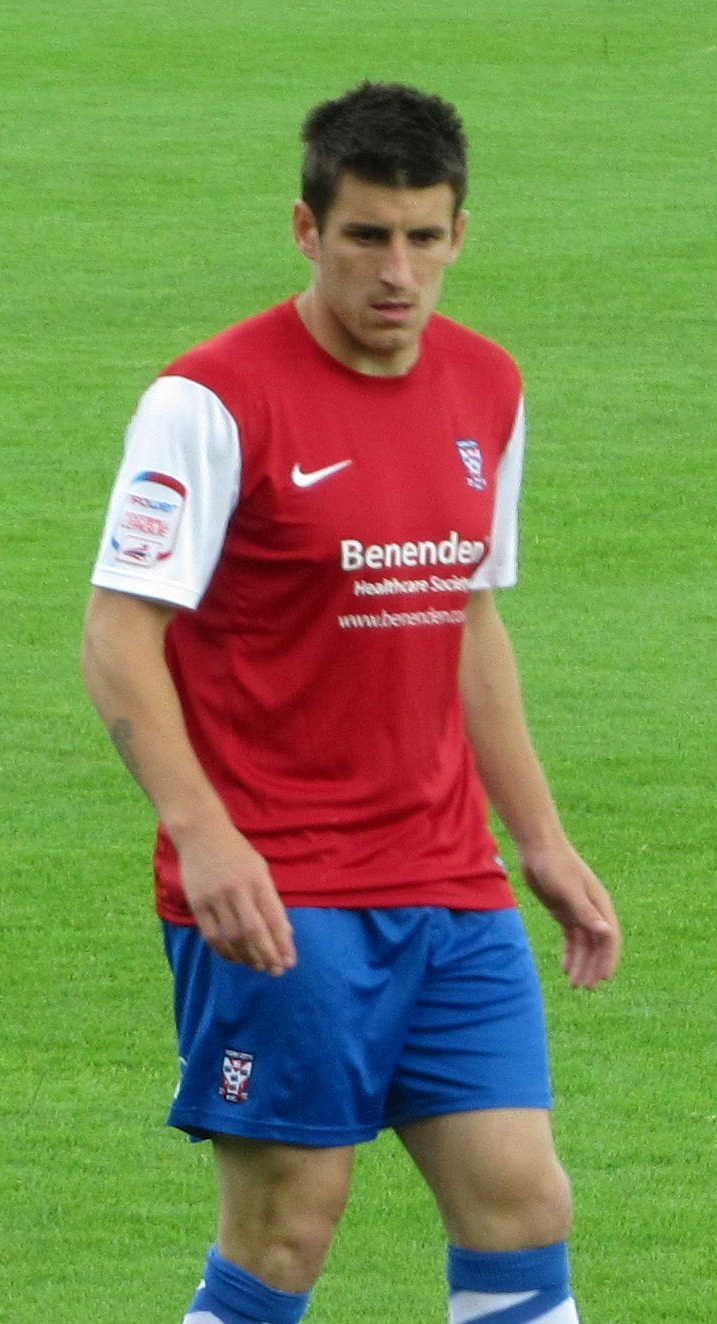
- Coulson playing for York City in 2012

Personal information
- Full name: Michael James Coulson
- Date of birth: 4 April 1988 (age 38)
- Place of birth: Scarborough, England
- Height: 5 ft 10 in (1.78 m)
- Positions: Striker; winger

Team information
- Current team: Bridlington Town (player/manager)

Youth career
- –2004: Scarborough

Senior career*
Years	Team	Apps	(Gls)
2004–2006	Scarborough	44	(9)
2006–2010	Barnsley	16	(0)
2007	→ Northwich Victoria (loan)	6	(2)
2009	→ Chester City (loan)	0	(0)
2009–2010	→ Grimsby Town (loan)	29	(5)
2010–2012	Grimsby Town	72	(16)
2012–2016	York City	117	(20)
2016–2017	St Johnstone	14	(0)
2017–2023	Scarborough Athletic	?	(?)
2023–2024	Farsley Celtic	26	(3)
2024–	Bridlington Town	46	(12)

International career
2012	England C	2	(0)

Managerial career
- 2025–: Bridlington Town
- * Club domestic league appearances and goals as of 12:51, 12 June 2024 (UTC)

Michael James Coulson (born 4 April 1988) is an English professional footballer who plays as a striker or winger for Northern Premier League Division One East club Bridlington Town, where he is also the clubs manager.

He has played in the Football League for Barnsley, Grimsby Town and York City and in the Scottish Premiership for St Johnstone. Coulson started his career with hometown club Scarborough, making his first-team debut in a Conference National match in 2004. His first goal for Scarborough, scored later that year, made him the youngest goalscorer in the club's history. He signed for Championship club Barnsley in 2006, before making a return to Conference Premier football with a loan at Northwich Victoria in 2007. Coulson suffered two cruciate ligament injuries in the space of a year before being loaned to Chester City of the Conference Premier in 2009. Coulson joined League Two club Grimsby Town on loan later that year, signing for the club permanently in 2010 after their relegation to the Conference Premier. He left Grimsby in 2012, signing for League Two club York City. In 2016, after four years with York, Coulson signed for Scottish Premiership club St Johnstone.

== Early and personal life ==
Coulson was born in Scarborough, North Yorkshire and attended Graham School in the town. He supported Scarborough F.C. from a young age, living a short distance from the club's ground, the Athletic Ground.

== Club career ==
=== Scarborough ===
Coulson started his career in the youth system of his hometown club Scarborough at the age of nine. In April 2004, he went on trial with Premier League club Everton, playing in a youth academy match against Liverpool. Coulson captained the Scarborough under-19 team that won the Northern Alliance League title in the 2003–04 season. He made his first-team debut as a 16-year-old after coming on as a 79th-minute substitute at home to Accrington Stanley in a 4–0 Conference National victory on 23 October 2004, making him the second youngest player in Scarborough's history. Coulson became Scarborough's youngest goalscorer after he scored an equalising goal against Tamworth in a 2–2 home draw on 15 March 2005 with 10 minutes of the match remaining. He signed a one-year professional contract with Scarborough on 5 April 2005 and finished 2004–05, his first in senior football, with two goals in 14 appearances.

During pre-season Scarborough manager Nick Henry stated his hope that Coulson, along with fellow youngster Ryan Blott, would fill the gap left by some high-profile departures in the summer. His first goal of 2005–06 came after scoring an 87th-minute equaliser in a 1–1 draw away to Altrincham on 20 September 2005, having entered the match as a second-half substitute. He went on trial with League One club Barnsley in January 2006 and the following month manager Andy Ritchie expressed his desire to sign Coulson in the summer. Despite this, Coulson decided against extending his trial at Barnsley, opting to return to the Scarborough team to help their fight against relegation. He finished the season seven goals from 33 appearances as Scarborough were relegated to the Conference North and was awarded the club's annual Players' Player of the Year and Fans' Player of the Year awards.

=== Barnsley ===
Coulson was signed by Barnsley on a two-year contract on 4 July 2006, following their promotion to the Championship. Ritchie described him as a "good young, raw talent who I am sure will develop into a fine addition to our squad". His debut came in Barnsley's 2–2 draw away to Blackpool in the League Cup on 22 August 2006, which Barnsley went on to win 4–2 in a penalty shoot-out, and was booked during the match for a collision with Blackpool goalkeeper Rhys Evans. He scored his first Barnsley goal with a close range header in the third minute of stoppage time away to Southend United in the FA Cup third round on 6 January 2007, making the score 1–1. He finished 2006–07 with one goal in six appearances.

He joined Conference Premier club Northwich Victoria on a one-month loan on 31 August 2007 to provide cover for the injured Lee Steele. He made his debut on 4 September 2007 in a 2–0 defeat at home to Burton Albion, in which he came close to scoring but goalkeeper Kevin Poole and defender John Brayford blocked his efforts on goal. His first goal for Northwich came with the team's only goal in a 3–1 home defeat to Histon, before being substituted in the 79th minute with calf strain. Coulson returned to Barnsley after the loan expired on 30 September 2007, despite caretaker manager Paul Warhurst having convinced him to stay at Northwich for another month. He finished the loan with two goals in six appearances.

Coulson's return to the Barnsley first team came on 1 January 2008 after entering a 2–2 draw at home to Scunthorpe United as a half-time substitute. Following this appearance, Coulson said: "I really enjoyed that chance and it has been a long time coming". His second Barnsley goal came with the winner in an FA Cup third round 2–1 victory over Blackpool on 5 January 2008, which was his first goal at Oakwell. He made an appearance as an 80th-minute substitute for match winner Kayode Odejayi in the 1–0 home victory over Premier League team Chelsea in the FA Cup quarter-final on 8 March 2008. He suffered a knee injury in training on 21 April 2008, rupturing an anterior cruciate ligament, which was expected to keep him sidelined for seven to nine months. Manager Simon Davey commented: "It's a complete disaster for him. He'd been coming on really well. He was the first name I looked to put on the bench". Some consolation came after being named as Barnsley's Young Player of the Year for 2007–08. He finished the season with 16 appearances and one goal for Barnsley.

Coulson returned to training in early November before making his return to action later that month, scoring in a reserve-team match against Grimsby Town. His first-team return came on 22 November 2008 after entering Barnsley's 2–1 defeat away to Preston North End as a 90th-minute substitute. However, a recurrence of his knee injury in January 2009 ruled him out of action for the rest of 2008–09, which he finished with three appearances. On 16 October 2009, Coulson signed a one-month loan deal with Conference Premier club Chester City, making his debut the following day against Gateshead in a 1–0 home victory. He scored his first goal for Chester on 7 November 2009 in a 3–1 away win over Grays Athletic. After Chester failed in an attempt to extend his loan he returned to Barnsley in November 2009, having scored one goal from five appearances. However, these were later removed from the records after Chester were expelled from the Football Conference the following February as a result of the club breaching five league rules.

=== Grimsby Town ===
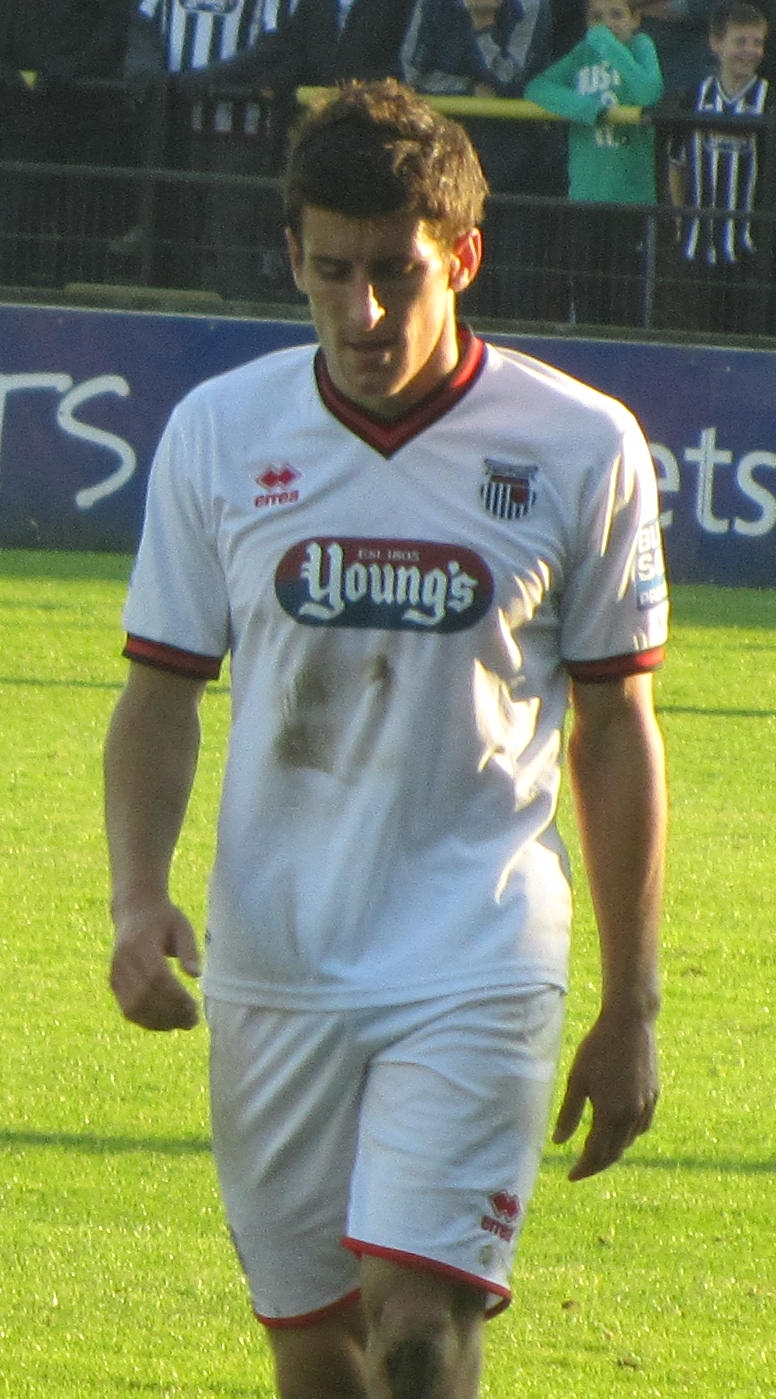
Coulson playing for Grimsby Town in 2011

On 19 November 2009, Coulson signed for League Two club Grimsby Town on an initial one-month loan. He made his debut two days later after starting in a 0–0 draw away to Lincoln City. He scored his first goal for Grimsby on 5 December 2009 in his fourth appearance, a 1–1 home draw with Dagenham & Redbridge, opening the scoring in the 36th minute before Dagenham equalised in the second half. His loan was extended for a second month in December 2009, keeping him at Grimsby until 23 January 2010. Shortly before the loan was due to expire, Coulson's stay at Grimsby was extended until the end of 2009–10 on 19 January 2010. He finished the season with five goals in 29 appearances for Grimsby, with the team being relegated to the Conference Premier.

Coulson was released by Barnsley at the end of the season, leaving him free to join Grimsby permanently, signing a two-year contract on 31 May 2010. In the third match of 2010–11, at home to Hayes & Yeading United on 21 August 2010, he took a kick to his ankle, which was expected to keep him out of the team for a month. He returned on 18 September 2010 after starting in a 2–1 defeat at home to Fleetwood Town, but was substituted at half-time. Coulson made a goalscoring second comeback from his ankle injury in Grimsby's 2–2 home draw with Eastbourne Borough on 30 October 2010. For the first time as a Grimsby player he scored twice in one match in a 2–1 victory at home to AFC Wimbledon on 5 March 2011, with a first-half shot into the bottom left of the goal and a second-half shot into the top-left corner from inside the penalty area. Coulson's first season as a permanent Grimsby player concluded having scored nine goals in 33 appearances.

His first goal of 2011–12 came with the winner in Grimsby's 1–0 away win over Forest Green Rovers on 3 September 2011 after capitalising on a defensive mistake. Coulson was handed a one-match suspension after accumulating five yellow cards, missing the home match against Newport County on 19 November. He made an immediate return to the Grimsby line-up, starting in their 1–0 home win over League Two team Port Vale in the FA Cup first round on 22 November 2011. His first two-goal haul of the season came in a 3–0 victory at home to Darlington in the FA Trophy first round on 10 December 2011, scoring Grimsby's first and third goals. It was announced on 23 April 2012 that Coulson had rejected a new two-year contract on reduced terms with Grimsby, meaning he would leave the club at the end of the season. Having been left out of the squad for Grimsby's final two matches of the season, Coulson spoke that he was saddened by the manner of his departure, saying "It would have been nice to go out on a high". He finished his final season at Grimsby with 52 appearances and 10 goals.

=== York City ===
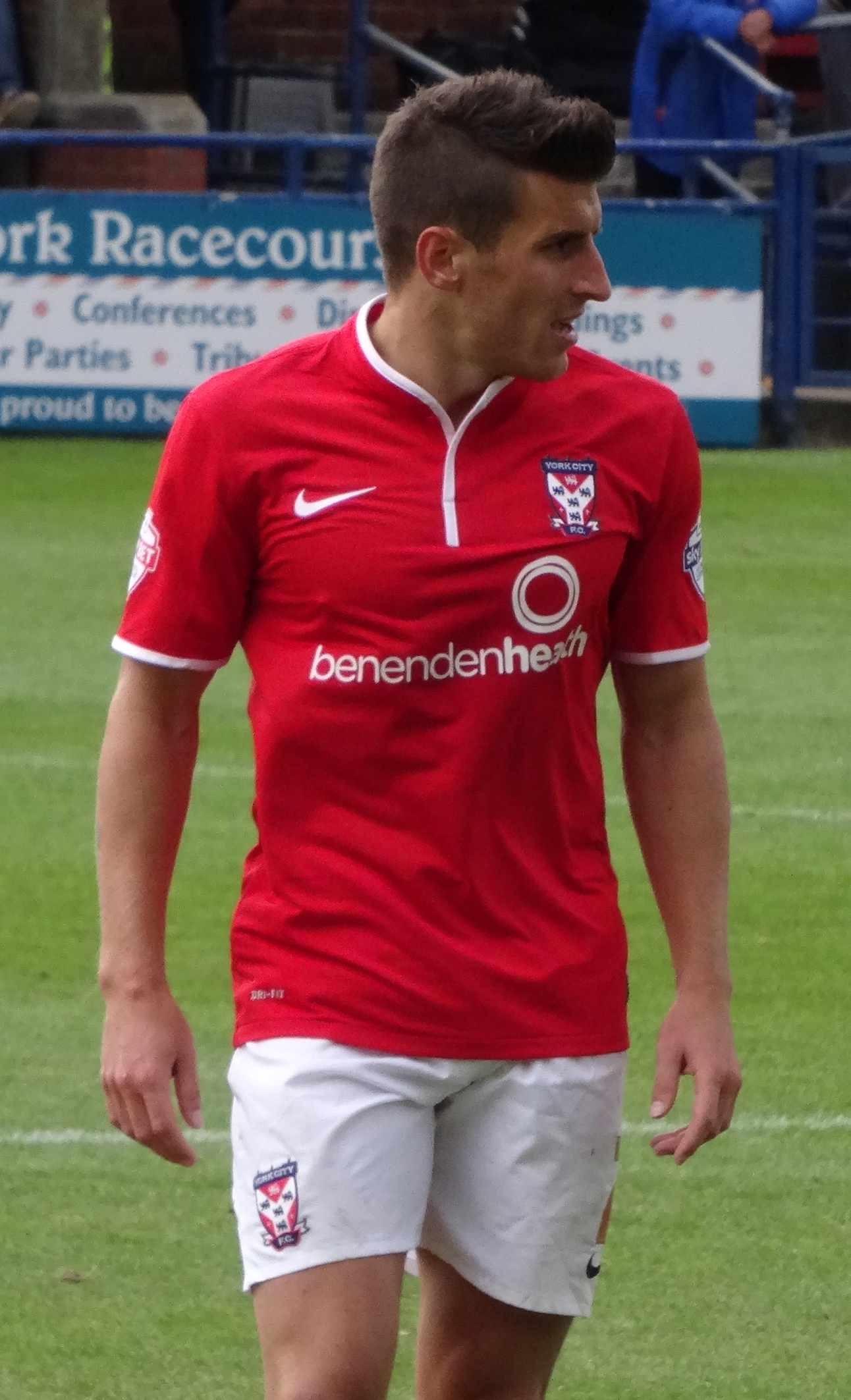
Coulson playing for York City in 2014

Coulson joined newly promoted League Two club York City on a two-year contract on 29 June 2012. He scored on his debut with a long-range strike away to League One team Doncaster Rovers in the League Cup first round to give York a 1–0 lead, with the match finishing 1–1 after extra time. Coulson missed York's first penalty in the ensuing penalty shoot-out, which the team lost 4–2. He then played in York's first Football League fixture since their promotion, a 3–1 defeat at home to Wycombe Wanderers on 18 August 2012. After sustaining a cruciate ligament injury during York's away match against Accrington on 23 October 2012, Coulson was expected to be out for the rest of 2012–13. However, he made his return as a 73rd-minute substitute in York's 0–0 draw away to Bristol Rovers on 30 March 2013. He finished the season with 21 appearances and five goals.

=== St Johnstone ===
In March 2016, Coulson signed a pre-contract deal with Scottish Premiership club St Johnstone, and would join on a two-year contract in the summer.

=== Scarborough Athletic ===
On 25 July 2017, Coulson signed for Northern Premier League Division One North club Scarborough Athletic. In the 2022 Northern Premier League play-off final, Coulson scored the first goal of the game in a 2–1 win against Warrington Town.

On 26 November 2023, Coulson departed the club by mutual consent in order to allow him to find more game time.

=== Farsley Celtic ===
On 1 December 2023, Coulson joined fellow National League North club Farsley Celtic.

=== Bridlington Town ===
In June 2024 Coulson left Farsley Celtic and joined Bridlington Town.

== Managerial career ==
On 20 November 2025, Coulson became player/manager of Bridlington Town.

== International career ==
Coulson was called into the England national C team in September 2010 for a match against Wales, but injury prevented him from making his debut. In February 2012, he received a second call up, being selected in the squad to face Italy in the 2011–2013 International Challenge Trophy on 28 February. Coulson started to make his England C debut, playing the entire match as he and fellow winger Matty Blair played well on the flanks, the match finishing a 1–1 home draw. He finished his England C career with two caps, earned in 2012.

== Style of play ==
He can operate as a striker or as a winger on either flank. He regularly played on the right wing when playing for Grimsby. Grimsby joint-manager Rob Scott noted Coulson's desire and work rate, saying "that isn't always evident in wingers. He does both sides of the game". His ability to set up others has been praised, with Scott describing his assist tally for 2011–12 as "excellent". While in the Scarborough youth team he played as an attacking midfielder.

== Career statistics ==
As of match played 15 April 2023

Appearances and goals by club, season and competition
Club	Season	League			National cup (Note: Includes FA Cup)		League cup (Note: Includes Football League Cup, Scottish League Cup)		Other		Total	
Club	Season	Division	Apps	Goals	Apps	Goals	Apps	Goals	Apps	Goals	Apps	Goals
Scarborough	2004–05	Conference National	11	2	2	0	—		1 (Note: Appearance in Conference League Cup)	0	14	2
Scarborough	2005–06	Conference National	33	7	0	0	—		0	0	33	7
Scarborough	Total		44	9	2	0	—		1	0	47	9
Barnsley	2006–07	Championship	2	0	2	1	2	0	—		6	1
Barnsley	2007–08	Championship	12	0	3	1	1	0	—		16	1
Barnsley	2008–09	Championship	2	0	1	0	0	0	—		3	0
Barnsley	2009–10	Championship	0	0	—		0	0	—		0	0
Barnsley	Total		16	0	6	2	3	0	—		25	2
Northwich Victoria (loan)	2007–08	Conference Premier	6	2	—		—		—		6	2
Grimsby Town (loan)	2009–10	League Two	29	5	—		—		—		29	5
Grimsby Town	2010–11	Conference Premier	29	8	2	0	—		2 (Note: Appearances in FA Trophy)	1	33	9
Grimsby Town	2011–12	Conference Premier	43	8	5	0	—		4	2	52	10
Grimsby Town	Total		101	21	7	0	—		6	3	114	24
York City	2012–13	League Two	19	4	0	0	1	1	1 (Note: Appearance(s) in Football League Trophy)	0	21	5
York City	2013–14	League Two	33	7	0	0	1	0	2 (Note: Appearances in League Two play-offs)	0	36	7
York City	2014–15	League Two	43	4	2	0	1	0	1	0	47	4
York City	2015–16	League Two	22	5	1	1	0	0	2	1	25	7
York City	Total		117	20	3	1	3	1	6	1	129	23
St Johnstone	2016–17	Scottish Premiership	14	0	0	0	4	0	—		18	0
Scarborough Athletic	2022–23	National League North	42	14	0	0	—		1	0	43	14
Career total			340	66	18	3	10	1	14	4	382	74

== Honours ==
Scarborough Athletic

- Northern Premier League play-offs: 2022

Individual

- Scarborough Player of the Year: 2005–06
- Northern Premier League Division One North Player of the Season: 2017–18
