= Sean Davies (footballer) =

English footballer

Sean Graham Davies (born 27 February 1985) is an English semi-professional footballer.

== Career ==
Davies started his footballing career at Middlesbrough, before playing for the Sunderland and Newcastle United School of Excellences. He then signed YTS forms with York City, and while still a YTS he played for their first team. York suffered relegation that season, but Davies was awarded a professional contract, and the following season made 36 appearances for the first team in total.

He was a supporter of then manager Chris Brass before Brass was sacked That season, Davies was allowed to leave York and went on trial at Cambridge United and Burton Albion. The following season, 2006–07, he signed for Scarborough and played 28 games for them that season.

Following this, he returned to the North East winning the Northern League 2 with Crook Town, Newton Aycliffe and Sunderland RCA. He is currently captaining Stokesley SC.
