= Anderson de Silva (footballer, born 1982) =

Brazilian footballer

Personal information
- Full name: Anderson Silva de França
- Date of birth: 28 August 1982 (age 44)
- Place of birth: São Paulo, Brazil
- Height: 6 ft 1 in (1.85 m)
- Position: Midfielder

Senior career*
Years	Team	Apps	(Gls)
2002–2005	Nacional	0	(0)
2003	→ Montevideo Wanderers (loan)	18	(2)
2003–2005	→ Racing de Santander (loan)	38	(2)
2005–2008	Everton	1	(0)
2005–2006	→ Málaga (loan)	15	(0)
2007	→ Barnsley (loan)	9	(0)
2007	→ Barnsley (loan)	7	(0)
2008–2010	Barnsley	67	(5)
2011	Nacional	8	(0)
2013	EC Pelotas	4	(0)
2014–2016	Rentistas	19	(0)
2016	Villa Española	17	(1)
2017	El Tanque Sisley	17	(0)
Total		220	(10)
- * Club domestic league appearances and goals

Anderson Silva de França (born 28 August 1982), known as Anderson de Silva, is a Brazilian former footballer who played as a midfielder.

== Career ==
His loan term at Everton was extended into the 2006–07 season, during which time Málaga were a lower-level Spanish Second Division side – about the equivalent of the Championship in England – in danger of being relegated and Da Silva was not even getting a game for their first team.

Eventually, after 18 months in limbo, he officially joined Everton on 2 January 2007.

He signed for Barnsley on a permanent basis for an undisclosed fee on 31 January 2008.

He played in the club's historic FA Cup win against Liverpool, before rupturing his anterior cruciate ligament in the following away game against Norwich City in late February, an injury which ruled him out for seven months.

He was released by Barnsley after the 2009/10 season.
