= Steven Bennett (footballer) =

English footballer

Personal information
- Full name: Steven Bennett
- Date of birth: 21 November 1991 (age 34)
- Position: Striker

Senior career*
| Years | Team | Apps | (Gls) |
| 2010–2011 | Barnsley | 4 | (0) |
| 2020–2021 | Wombwell Town | 4 | (3) |
- Ossett Town
- Athersley Recreation
- Grimethorpe LLUK
- * Club domestic league appearances and goals as of 21:49, 15 July 2021 (UTC)

Steven Bennett (born 21 November 1991) is an English former footballer who played as a striker in the Football League.

== Career ==
Bennett made his debut for Barnsley on 26 December 2010, in the Football League Championship match against Burnley, coming on as a second-half substitute for Andy Gray. He made three more appearances for Barnsley before being released by the club in May 2011 with four other players.

Following his departure from Barnsley, Bennett played for non-league sides Ossett Town, Athersley Recreation, Grimethorpe LLUK.

He joined Wombwell Town at the start of the 2021–21 season and scored three times in four appearances for the Sheffield & Hallamshire County Senior Football League side.

== Personal life ==
He is the younger brother of former Lincoln City footballer Lee Bennett. The duo played together at Ossett Town, Athersley Recreation and Wombwell Town.

== Later life ==
In 2013 Bennett was jailed for three years for robbery and affray; after his release, he worked in telecoms.

In September 2019, Bennett was driving an HGV on the M56 near Lymm when he caused a chain reaction crash; two people died and five were injured. He was charged in July 2020 with two counts of causing death by dangerous driving. In September 2020, he pleaded guilty to the lesser charge of death by careless driving; the following August, at the start of his scheduled trial on the two charges of causing death by dangerous driving, he changed his plea to guilty. The court heard evidence that he had been distracted by his mobile phone, which he had been plugging and unplugging on its charger while using it as a satnav. On 16 September 2021, Bennett was sentenced to five years in prison and his licence was suspended.
