= Daniel Bogdanović =

Maltese footballer

Personal information
- Full name: Danijel Bogdanović
- Date of birth: 26 March 1980 (age 46)
- Place of birth: Misrata, Libya
- Height: 1.88 m (6 ft 2 in)
- Position: Forward

Senior career*
Years	Team	Apps	(Gls)
2000–2001	Sliema Wanderers	7	(2)
2001	Vasas	1	(0)
2001–2002	Naxxar Lions	18	(11)
2002	Valletta	15	(11)
2003	Cherno More	7	(1)
2003	Sliema Wanderers	10	(1)
2004–2005	Marsaxlokk	21	(14)
2005–2006	Sliema Wanderers	22	(10)
2006–2007	Marsaxlokk	28	(31)
2007–2008	Cisco Roma	16	(4)
2008–2009	Lokomotiv Sofia	14	(2)
2009–2010	Barnsley	45	(16)
2010–2011	Sheffield United	34	(5)
2011–2012	Blackpool	8	(2)
2012	→ Rochdale (loan)	5	(1)
2012	→ Notts County (loan)	8	(2)
2012–2013	Mosta	13	(5)
2013	Valletta	9	(0)
2013	Floriana	4	(1)
2014	Victoria Wanderers		
2014–2019	Xewkija Tigers	14	(25)
2019–2020	Għajnsielem	4	

International career^{‡}
2002–2012	Malta	41	(1)
2010	Gozo	1	(0)
- * Club domestic league appearances and goals as of 28 June 2013 (UTC) ‡ National team caps and goals as of 30 March 2013 (UTC)

Daniel Bogdanović (born 26 March 1980) is a retired footballer who played as a striker. Born in Libya, he represented the Malta national team.

== Club career ==
Bogdanović spent six months with Cherno More during the second half of the 2002–03 season in the A PFG.

In the 2006–07 season, Bogdanović scored 31 goals, winning him the Golden Boot and also the Maltese Player of the Year.

=== Marsaxlokk ===
Bogdanović joined Marsaxlokk for the 2006–07 Maltese season, and Marsaxlokk built a strong title challenge. With Marsaxlokk front-runners and the season drawing to a close, Bogdanović found himself well ahead in the goalscoring charts and scored the final goal in a 4–1 defeat of second-placed Sliema Wanderers. With this win, Marsaxlokk were crowned as league champions for the first time in their history. Bogdanović finished as the league's top goalscorer with 31 goals in 28 appearances, and ended the season one goal short of the record set by Danilo Dončić, who twice hit the 32-goal mark in a single season, first with Valletta during the 1996–97 season and then with Sliema Wanderers in the 2001–02 season.

Following Marsaxlokk's triumph in the Maltese Premier League, and the end of the player's one-year contract, Bogdanović decided not to renew and instead decided to search for a club elsewhere in continental Europe.

=== Cisco Roma ===
Following weeks of various trials, Bogdanović joined Italian side Cisco Roma, just in time to feature for the new season in Italy (during this time Cisco Roma was playing in Lega Pro Seconda Divisione). Bogdanović went on to form a partnership with Paolo Di Canio.

During his time with the club, Bogdanović made sixteen appearances and found the net four times.

=== Lokomotiv Sofia ===
In August 2008, Bogdanović signed a two-year deal with Bulgarian club Lokomotiv Sofia, following a successful trial.

Bogdanović had initially joined Lokomotiv Sofia two weeks prior at a training camp in the Netherlands. He appeared as a second-half substitute in a friendly match against Israeli outfit Maccabi Petah Tikva, a game in which Lokomotiv came out 1–0 winners. Bogdanović was again included in the next friendly match against German Bundesliga team Schalke, and played the full match.

The team's next game was against Turkish side Ankaraspor, in which Bogdanović played no part, but he was back for the final game, against Second Division outfit Sportist Svoge, in which he made a second-half substitute appearance and scored the second goal in his team's 4–2 victory.

Lokomotiv had, earlier on in the season, appointed Danilo Dončić as assistant to manager Dragan Okuka, and it was at the request of the former Floriana coach Dončić that Bogdanović received his trial.

=== Barnsley ===
On 26 January 2009 it was confirmed that Bogdanović had signed for Barnsley for an undisclosed fee, signing a deal until 2010. He received clearance and played in the 1–2 defeat to Ipswich Town, scoring Barnsley's goal on 47 minutes.

Despite having a second successful season at Barnsley, he was released by the club.

=== Sheffield United ===
Bogdanović began talks with Sheffield United, before eventually signing a two–year deal with the club at the start of June 2010. Despite being a relatively high-profile signing he found it difficult to break into the first team and although he made 33 appearances during his first season, the majority were from the bench in the very latter stages of games. He finished the season having scored only five goals as The Blades were relegated to League One. The start of the following season found him still unable to hold down a first team place as he was overlooked by new manager Danny Wilson.

=== Blackpool ===
On 31 August 2011 he signed a one-year deal with the option of a further year with Blackpool, for a fee of £250,000 and was given the number 13 shirt. He made his début for the Tangerines as a second-half substitute in a victory over Ipswich Town at Bloomfield Road on 10 September. He scored his first and what turned out to be only goals for Blackpool when he scored twice in a 5–0 win over Bristol City on 1 October. Despite this Bogdanović was unable to make the breakthrough into the first team and joined Rochdale in a 28-day emergency loan deal on 2 January 2012, citing that the opportunity to link up with Rochdale's assistant caretaker-manager Ryan Kidd, with whom Bogdanović had worked whilst at Barnsley, had been a major factor in making the decision to join the Dale. On his début, the same day, he started the game, scored and was named Man of the Match against Preston North End in a 1–1 draw. He played another four times for Rochdale without further goals, before returning to parent club Blackpool. He was then loaned out to Notts County until the end of the season, where he netted 2 goals in 8 games. With first team opportunities still eluding him Bogdanović was released by Blackpool in May 2012 due to the expiry of his contract.

=== Mosta ===
He returned to Malta with Mosta for the 2012–13 season. In August 2012 he was linked with a return to English football with Portsmouth but the move failed due to failure to agree terms. Later he moved to Valletta F.C. on loan until the end of the season 2012–13.

=== Floriana ===
At the start of a new season 2013–14, Daniel signed for Floriana on a three-year deal. He started the season on a positive note as Floriana won the AME Cup (Summer friendly tournament), the latter then debuted with the Greens against his former club Naxxar Lions; he then scored his first goal with the Green and White shirt of Floriana against Vittoriosa Stars on 15 September 2013 at the Victor Tedesco Stadium, Hamrun in which the game ended 2–1 in favour of the boys in Green.

== International career ==
He made his international début on 9 February 2002 in a friendly against Jordan and he earned a total of 41 caps, scoring 1 goal. His final international was a September 2012 FIFA World Cup qualification match against Italy. He represented his country in 5 FIFA World Cup qualification matches and 18 UEFA European Championship qualifying games.

=== International goals ===
Scores and results list. Malta's goal tally first.

#	Date	Venue	Opponent	Score	Result	Competition
1.	12 February 2003	Ta' Qali Stadium, Ta' Qali	Kazakhstan	1–0	2–2	Friendly

== Personal life ==
He is of Serbian and Slovenian descent.

He was married to Alison Apap, sister of footballer Ferdinando Apap. After their divorce, Bogdanović had a relationship with then-Minister of Education Justyne Caruana.

== Honours ==
Sliema Wanderers

- Maltese Premier League: 1

2004

Marsaxlokk

- Maltese Premier League: 1

2007

Xewkija Tigers

- Gozo Football League First Division: 2

2015, 2017
