= Hugo Colace (footballer) =

Argentine footballer (born 1984)

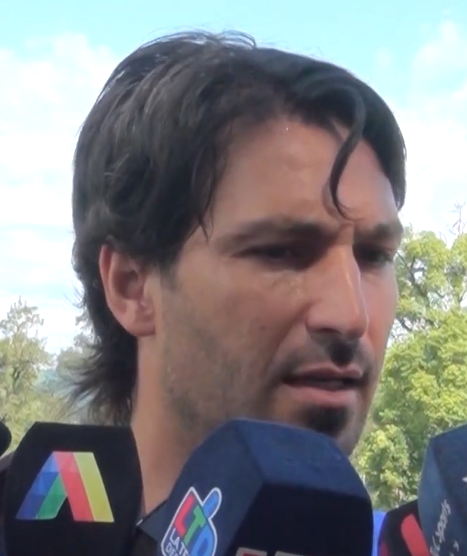
- Colace in 2025

Personal information
- Date of birth: 6 January 1984 (age 42)
- Place of birth: Buenos Aires, Argentina
- Height: 1.78 m (5 ft 10 in)
- Position: Midfielder

Team information
- Current team: Atlético Morelia (manager)

Youth career
- –2001: Argentinos Juniors

Senior career*
Years	Team	Apps	(Gls)
2001–2004	Argentinos Juniors	36	(0)
2005–2008	Newell's Old Boys	32	(1)
2007	→ Estudiantes (loan)	5	(0)
2007–2008	→ Flamengo (loan)	5	(0)
2008–2011	Barnsley	101	(8)
2011–2012	Estudiantes Tecos	21	(1)
2012	Auxerre	3	(0)
2014–2015	All Boys	2	(0)
2015–2016	Olimpo	0	(0)
2016	Deportivo Capiatá	5	(1)
2016–2017	Mons Calpe	20	(5)
2017–2018	Atlético dos Arcos		
2018	Paceco 1976	14	(3)
2018	Città di Siderno		
2018–2019	Orietana		
2019	Mons Calpe	7	(1)
2019–2021	Bangor City		

International career
2001	Argentina U17	5	(2)
2003	Argentina U20	7	(0)

Managerial career
- 2020–2021: Bangor City
- 2022–2023: Santos Laguna (assistant)
- 2023–2024: Necaxa (assistant)
- 2025: Atlético Tucumán (reserves)
- 2025: Atlético Tucumán (caretaker)
- 2025–2026: Atlético Tucumán
- 2026–: Atlético Morelia
- * Club domestic league appearances and goals

Hugo Roberto Colace (born 6 January 1984) is an Argentine football manager and former professional footballer who played as a midfielder. Since August 2026 is the manager of Mexican club Atlético Morelia.

He previously played for French side AJ Auxerre, Série A club Flamengo and Argentine top-level clubs.

He left Barnsley on 30 June 2010. He turned down Crystal Palace to return to Barnsley on 20 July. At the end of the 2010–11 Championship season, he was released from Barnsley.

== Club career ==
Born in Buenos Aires, Colace joined Flamengo on 30 August 2007, and on 23 September 2007, he played his first match as a Flamengo player, a Campeonato Brasileiro match against Juventude at Estádio Alfredo Jaconi, in which he came as a substitute for Cristian Baroni. He joined English club Barnsley F.C. on a three-year deal on 27 June 2008. During the 2009–10 season, Colace scored 8 goals in all competitions. He received Barnsley's player of the season and player's player of the season award on 21 April 2010, but was not keen on signing a new contract. He finally agreed to return to Oakwell on 20 July 2010, signing a two-year contract.

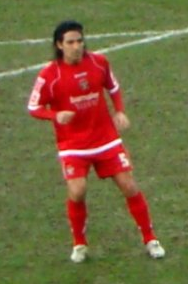
Colace playing for Barnsley in 2010

Listed for loan due to a loss in form with Barnsley, on 31 May 2011, Colace signed with Mexican club Estudiantes Tecos. Tecos was relegated in the 2011–12 season and he joined Ligue 2 side AJ Auxerre in September 2012.

On 6 November 2015, it was announced that Colace would be spending some time on trial at his former club, Barnsley, in the hope of earning a contract.

On 2 January 2020, Colace signed with Welsh club Bangor City F.C. and became player-manager in 2020. In October 2021 his contract with the club was terminated after a club investigation into his conduct and the team's performance in the league that season. He contested the charges made against him by the club in a statement released on social media and highlighted the lack of payment of staff and players by the club's president.

In December 2024, he became the manager of the reserves team for the Argentine club Atlético Tucumán. On 26 October 2025, he was promoted to manage the first team, replacing Lucas Pusineri. On 24 February 2026 Colace was fired due to a poor start to the season.

On 6 August 2026, he was signed by Mexican team Atlético Morelia.

== International career ==
Colace represented the Argentina national under-20 football team in the FIFA World Youth Championship in 2003, when his country finished in the fourth position. He captained the side which included players such as Carlos Tevez, Javier Mascherano and Pablo Zabaleta.

== Honours ==
Individual

- Barnsley Player of the Year: 2009–10
