= Jamil Adam =

English footballer (born 1991)

Personal information
- Full name: Jamil Buba Adam
- Date of birth: 5 June 1991 (age 35)
- Place of birth: Bolton (borough), England
- Height: 5 ft 10 in (1.78 m)
- Position: Forward

Team information
- Current team: Flint Town United

Youth career
- –2007: Manchester City
- 2007–2008: Barnsley

Senior career*
Years	Team	Apps	(Gls)
2008–2011	Barnsley	4	(0)
2011–2012	Baldock Town	17	(10)
2012–2013	Burscough	14	(4)
2013	Buckley Town	15	(9)
2014	Penycae	22	(16)
2014–	Flint Town United	30	(18)

International career
2009–2010	Republic of Ireland U19	3	(2)
2010	Republic of Ireland U21	2	(2)
- * Club domestic league appearances and goals as of 20:10, 18 January 2011 (UTC)

Jamil Buba Adam (born 5 June 1991) is an English footballer of Nigerian and Irish descent who plays as a striker for Flint Town United, having previously played for Championship side Barnsley.

== Career ==
Adam began his youth career with Premiership side Manchester City where he won the club's 2008 Academy Player of the Year. After leaving City, Jamil joined Championship side Barnsley and made his debut in the final game of the 2007–08 season against Cardiff City. Next season, Adam bagged a brace in the first friendly match in the 4–1 win at Buxton and the following day, he scored against Glossop North End for Barnsley.

At the end of the 2009–10 season, Jamil was named Barnsley's Young Player of the Year.

On 12 January 2011, Adam left Barnsley by mutual consent after making one league appearance for The Tykes and also making a brief substitute appearance in the FA Cup against West Ham.

== International career ==
Adam is eligible to play for England, Nigeria, or Ireland. He has previously been called up to Nigeria underage sides but has since made his debut for the Republic of Ireland Under-19 side and played in the UEFA Championship first qualifying stage in San Marino in November 2009 where he scored in a 5–0 victory. He scored his second goal for the U19 side in a 4–2 win over Poland Under-19s.

Jamil also represented the Republic of Under-19 side in the Clarion Hotels U19 Four Nations Tournament where he made two substitute appearances against Turkey Under-19s and Holland Under-19s.

== Honours ==
Barnsley

2010 Young Player of the Year
