= Luke Potter =

English footballer (born 1989)

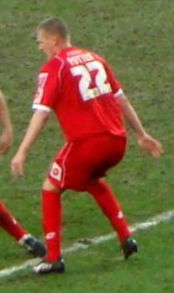
- Potter playing for Barnsley

Personal information
- Full name: Luke Alexander Potter
- Date of birth: 13 July 1989 (age 37)
- Place of birth: Barnsley, England
- Position: Defender

Youth career
- 2005–2007: Barnsley

Senior career*
Years	Team	Apps	(Gls)
2007–2012	Barnsley	28	(0)
2007	→ Stafford Rangers (loan)	12	(0)
2009	→ Kettering Town (loan)	22	(0)
2011	→ Alfreton Town (loan)	2	(0)
Total		64	(0)

Managerial career
- 2017–2019: Athersley Recreation
- 2024–2025: Basford United
- * Club domestic league appearances and goals

Luke Alexander Potter (born 17 July 1989) is an English former professional footballer who played as a defender. He was recently manager of Basford United.

== Career ==
Born in Barnsley, Potter made his league debut in Barnsley's final fixture of the 2006–07 season, in which Barnsley lost 7–0 at West Bromwich Albion.

He has had three loan spells away from Oakwell. In late 2007 he spent two months on loan at Conference National team Stafford Rangers, and on January transfer window deadline day 2009, joined Kettering Town until the end of the 2008–09 season. Potter announced his retirement from football on 3 April 2012, after suffering from a long recurring knee injury.

== Coaching career ==
After retiring, he worked as a coach at the Barnsley academy and was assistant manager at Ossett Albion for four years. In September 2017 he was appointed manager of Athersley Recreation. He resigned from the role in May 2019. In June 2019, he was appointed assistant coach at Matlock Town. Potter left the club on 22 January 2020 together with head coach Steve Kittrick.

On 11 April, Potter became Assistant Manager to Kittrick once again at Guiseley on an interim basis, following the dismissal of Marcus Bignot and Russ O'Neill.

In December 2024, Potter was appointed manager of Northern Premier League Premier Division side Basford United.
