= 2010–11 Football League Championship =

Football League Championship
- Season: 2010–11
- Champions: Queens Park Rangers; 1st Championship title 2nd 2nd tier title
- Promoted: Queens Park Rangers; Norwich City; Swansea City
- Relegated: Preston North End; Scunthorpe United; Sheffield United
- Matches: 552
- Goals: 1,510 (2.74 per match)
- Top goalscorer: Danny Graham (24)
- Biggest home win: Norwich City 6–0 Scunthorpe United (2 April 2011)
- Biggest away win: Doncaster Rovers 0–6 Ipswich Town (15 February 2011)
- Highest scoring: Leeds United 4–6 Preston North End (28 September 2010)
- Longest winning run: 8 games Reading
- Longest unbeaten run: 19 games Queens Park Rangers
- Longest winless run: 14 games Preston North End; Sheffield United
- Longest losing run: 6 games Ipswich Town
- Highest attendance: 33,622; Leeds United 1–0 Sheffield United (25 September 2010)
- Lowest attendance: 4,190; Scunthorpe United 0–3 Preston North End (15 March 2011)
- Average attendance: 17,457

The 2010–11 Football League Championship (known as the npower Championship for sponsorship reasons) was the seventh season of the league under its current name and nineteenth season under its current league division format. It started on 6 August 2010 and concluded on 7 May 2011, with the resultant play-offs concluding with the final on 30 May.

Queens Park Rangers secured the Championship title on 30 April 2011, ending their 15-year hiatus from the Premier League, while Norwich City secured the second automatic promotion spot two days later, ending a six-year absence from the top flight. Swansea City won the play-off final to take the final promotion place.

Preston North End, Scunthorpe United and Sheffield United were relegated to League One.

== Changes from last season ==
=== Team changes ===
==== From Championship ====
Promoted to Premier League:

- Newcastle United
- West Bromwich Albion
- Blackpool

Relegated to League One:

- Peterborough United
- Plymouth Argyle
- Sheffield Wednesday

==== To Championship ====
Relegated from Premier League:

- Burnley
- Hull City
- Portsmouth

Promoted from League One:

- Norwich City
- Leeds United
- Millwall

=== Rule changes ===
==== Off-field rules ====
- New financial reporting rules see transfer embargoes imposed on those clubs which fail to lodge their accounts with the Football League, at the same time they are required by Companies House.
- The Football League's fit and proper person test was renamed the Director's Test to ensure continuity with other football bodies.

=== Sponsorship changes ===
After Coca-Cola's sponsorship contract expired and was not renewed, Npower signed a three-year contract to become the Football League's official partner. The Coca-Cola Player of the Month and Coca-Cola Manager of the Month awards are therefore now known as the Npower Player of the Month and the Npower Manager of the Month award respectively.

== Team overview ==
=== Stadia and locations ===
Locations of teams in the 2010–11 Football League Championship

| Team | Location | Stadium | Capacity |
|---|---|---|---|
| Barnsley | Barnsley | Oakwell | 23,009 |
| Bristol City | Bristol | Ashton Gate | 21,497 |
| Burnley | Burnley | Turf Moor | 22,546 |
| Cardiff City | Cardiff | Cardiff City Stadium | 26,828 |
| Coventry City | Coventry | Ricoh Arena | 32,609 |
| Crystal Palace | London | Selhurst Park | 26,309 |
| Derby County | Derby | Pride Park Stadium | 33,597 |
| Doncaster Rovers | Doncaster | Keepmoat Stadium | 15,231 |
| Hull City | Kingston upon Hull | KC Stadium | 25,404 |
| Ipswich Town | Ipswich | Portman Road | 30,311 |
| Leeds United | Leeds | Elland Road | 39,460 |
| Leicester City | Leicester | King Power Stadium | 32,500 |
| Middlesbrough | Middlesbrough | Riverside Stadium | 34,988 |
| Millwall | London | The Den | 20,146 |
| Norwich City | Norwich | Carrow Road | 27,033 |
| Nottingham Forest | Nottingham | City Ground | 30,576 |
| Portsmouth | Portsmouth | Fratton Park | 20,224 |
| Preston North End | Preston | Deepdale | 23,408 |
| Queens Park Rangers | London | Loftus Road | 18,360 |
| Reading | Reading | Madejski Stadium | 24,224 |
| Scunthorpe United | Scunthorpe | Glanford Park | 9,088 |
| Sheffield United | Sheffield | Bramall Lane | 32,702 |
| Swansea City | Swansea | Liberty Stadium | 20,532 |
| Watford | Watford | Vicarage Road | 23,500 |

=== Personnel and sponsoring ===
| Team | Manager | Chairman | Team captain | Kit maker | Sponsor |
|---|---|---|---|---|---|
| Barnsley | Mark Robins | Patrick Cyrne | Jason Shackell | Lotto | Barnsley Building Society |
| Bristol City | Keith Millen | Steve Lansdown | Louis Carey | adidas | DAS |
| Burnley | Eddie Howe | Barry Kilby | Graham Alexander | Puma | Fun88 |
| Cardiff City | Dave Jones | Chan Tien Ghee | Craig Bellamy | Puma | SBOBET |
| Coventry City | Andy Thorn | Ken Dulieu | Lee Carsley | Puma | City Link |
| Crystal Palace | Dougie Freedman | Steve Parish; Martin Long | Paddy McCarthy | Nike | GAC Logistics |
| Derby County | Nigel Clough | Andrew Appleby | Robbie Savage | adidas | buymobiles.net |
| Doncaster Rovers | Sean O'Driscoll | John Ryan | Brian Stock | Nike | One Call Insurance |
| Hull City | Nigel Pearson | Assem Allam | Andy Dawson | adidas | Totesport.com |
| Ipswich Town | Paul Jewell | Marcus Evans | David Norris | Mitre | Marcus Evans |
| Leeds United | Simon Grayson | Ken Bates | Richard Naylor | Macron | NetFlights.com |
| Leicester City | Sven-Göran Eriksson | Vichai Srivaddhanaprabha | Matt Oakley | BURRDA | King Power |
| Middlesbrough | Tony Mowbray | Steve Gibson | Matthew Bates | Adidas | Sponsors come on a monthly basis^{1} |
| Millwall | Kenny Jackett | John Berylson | Paul Robinson | Macron | CYC |
| Norwich City | Paul Lambert | Alan Bowkett | Grant Holt | Xara | Aviva |
| Nottingham Forest | Billy Davies | Nigel Doughty | Paul McKenna | Umbro | Victor Chandler |
| Portsmouth | Steve Cotterill | Balram Chainrai | Aaron Mokoena | Kappa | Jobsite |
| Preston North End | Phil Brown | Maurice Lindsay | Sean St Ledger | Puma | Tennent's Lager |
| Queens Park Rangers | Neil Warnock | Ishan Saksena | Adel Taarabt | Lotto | Gulf Air |
| Reading | Brian McDermott | John Madejski | Ívar Ingimarsson | Puma | Waitrose |
| Scunthorpe United | Alan Knill | J. Steven Wharton | Cliff Byrne | Nike | Rainham Steel |
| Sheffield United | Micky Adams | Kevin McCabe | Chris Morgan | Macron | VisitMalta.com |
| Swansea City | Brendan Rodgers | Huw Jenkins | Garry Monk | Umbro | 32Red |
| Watford | Malky Mackay | Graham Taylor | John Eustace | BURRDA | BURRDA, Umbria Televisione |

^{1}Middlesbrough's sponsors include: Deepdale Solutions (7 – 30 August), Wiring Services (1–30 September), Ramsdens (1 October – 5 March), Marie Curie Cancer Care (6–8 March)

==== Managerial changes ====
| Team | Outgoing manager | Manner of departure | Date of vacancy | Position in table | Incoming manager | Date of appointment |
|---|---|---|---|---|---|---|
| Crystal Palace | (England) Paul Hart | Contract expired | 2 May 2010 | Pre-season | (Scotland) George Burley | 17 June 2010 |
| Coventry City | (Wales) Chris Coleman | Sacked | 4 May 2010 | Pre-season | (England) Aidy Boothroyd | 20 May 2010 |
| Hull City | (Northern Ireland) Iain Dowie | Contract expired | 9 May 2010 | Pre-season | (England) Nigel Pearson | 29 June 2010 |
| Portsmouth | (Israel) Avram Grant | Resigned | 20 May 2010 | Pre-season | (England) Steve Cotterill | 18 June 2010 |
| Leicester City | (England) Nigel Pearson | Signed by Hull City | 29 June 2010 | Pre-season | (Portugal) Paulo Sousa | 7 July 2010 |
| Swansea City | (Portugal) Paulo Sousa | Signed by Leicester City | 5 July 2010 | Pre-season | (Northern Ireland) Brendan Rodgers | 16 July 2010 |
| Bristol City | (England) Steve Coppell | Resigned | 12 August 2010 | 23rd | (England) Keith Millen | 12 August 2010 |
| Sheffield United | (England) Kevin Blackwell | Mutual consent | 14 August 2010 | 21st | (Wales) Gary Speed | 17 August 2010 |
| Scunthorpe United | (England) Nigel Adkins | Signed By Southampton | 12 September 2010 | 15th | (England) Ian Baraclough | 24 September 2010 |
| Leicester City | (Portugal) Paulo Sousa | Sacked | 1 October 2010 | 24th | (Sweden) Sven-Göran Eriksson | 3 October 2010 |
| Middlesbrough | (Scotland) Gordon Strachan | Resigned | 18 October 2010 | 20th | (England) Tony Mowbray | 26 October 2010 |
| Sheffield United | (Wales) Gary Speed | Signed by Wales | 14 December 2010 | 20th | (England) Micky Adams | 30 December 2010 |
| Burnley | (England) Brian Laws | Sacked | 29 December 2010 | 9th | (England) Eddie Howe | 14 January 2011 |
| Preston North End | (Scotland) Darren Ferguson | Sacked | 29 December 2010 | 24th | (England) Phil Brown | 6 January 2011 |
| Crystal Palace | (Scotland) George Burley | Sacked | 1 January 2011 | 23rd | (Scotland) Dougie Freedman | 12 January 2011 |
| Ipswich Town | (Republic of Ireland) Roy Keane | Sacked | 7 January 2011 | 19th | (England) Paul Jewell | 10 January 2011 |
| Coventry City | (England) Aidy Boothroyd | Sacked | 14 March 2011 | 19th | (England) Andy Thorn | 28 April 2011 |
| Scunthorpe United | (England) Ian Baraclough | Sacked | 16 March 2011 | 22nd | (Wales) Alan Knill | 31 March 2011 |

==== Ownership changes ====
| Club | New owner | Previous owner | Date |
|---|---|---|---|
| Cardiff City | Datuk Chan Tien Ghee | Peter Ridsdale | 27 May 2010 |
| Crystal Palace | Steve Parish; Martin Long | Administrator | 7 June 2010 |
| Preston North End | Trevor Hemmings | Derek Shaw | 3 June 2010 |
| Leicester City | Aiyawatt Raksriaksorn | Milan Mandarić | 12 August 2010 |
| Portsmouth | Balram Chainrai | Administrator | 24 October 2010 |
| Hull City | Assem Allam | Russell Bartlett | 17 December 2010 |

== League table ==
| Pos | Team | Pld | W | D | L | GF | GA | GD | Pts | Promotion, qualification or relegation |
|---|---|---|---|---|---|---|---|---|---|---|
| 1 | Queens Park Rangers (C, P) | 46 | 24 | 16 | 6 | 71 | 32 | +39 | 88 | Promotion to the Premier League |
| 2 | Norwich City (P) | 46 | 23 | 15 | 8 | 83 | 58 | +25 | 84 | Promotion to the Premier League |
| 3 | Swansea City (O, P) | 46 | 24 | 8 | 14 | 69 | 42 | +27 | 80 | Qualification for Championship play-offs |
| 4 | Cardiff City | 46 | 23 | 11 | 12 | 76 | 54 | +22 | 80 | Qualification for Championship play-offs |
| 5 | Reading | 46 | 20 | 17 | 9 | 77 | 51 | +26 | 77 | Qualification for Championship play-offs |
| 6 | Nottingham Forest | 46 | 20 | 15 | 11 | 69 | 50 | +19 | 75 | Qualification for Championship play-offs |
| 7 | Leeds United | 46 | 19 | 15 | 12 | 81 | 70 | +11 | 72 | |
| 8 | Burnley | 46 | 18 | 14 | 14 | 65 | 61 | +4 | 68 | |
| 9 | Millwall | 46 | 18 | 13 | 15 | 62 | 48 | +14 | 67 | |
| 10 | Leicester City | 46 | 19 | 10 | 17 | 76 | 71 | +5 | 67 | |
| 11 | Hull City | 46 | 16 | 17 | 13 | 52 | 51 | +1 | 65 | |
| 12 | Middlesbrough | 46 | 17 | 11 | 18 | 68 | 68 | 0 | 62 | |
| 13 | Ipswich Town | 46 | 18 | 8 | 20 | 62 | 68 | −6 | 62 | |
| 14 | Watford | 46 | 16 | 13 | 17 | 77 | 71 | +6 | 61 | |
| 15 | Bristol City | 46 | 17 | 9 | 20 | 62 | 65 | −3 | 60 | |
| 16 | Portsmouth | 46 | 15 | 13 | 18 | 53 | 60 | −7 | 58 | |
| 17 | Barnsley | 46 | 14 | 14 | 18 | 55 | 66 | −11 | 56 | |
| 18 | Coventry City | 46 | 14 | 13 | 19 | 54 | 58 | −4 | 55 | |
| 19 | Derby County | 46 | 13 | 10 | 23 | 58 | 71 | −13 | 49 | |
| 20 | Crystal Palace | 46 | 12 | 12 | 22 | 44 | 69 | −25 | 48 | |
| 21 | Doncaster Rovers | 46 | 11 | 15 | 20 | 55 | 81 | −26 | 48 | |
| 22 | Preston North End (R) | 46 | 10 | 12 | 24 | 54 | 79 | −25 | 42 | Relegation to Football League One |
| 23 | Sheffield United (R) | 46 | 11 | 9 | 26 | 44 | 79 | −35 | 42 | Relegation to Football League One |
| 24 | Scunthorpe United (R) | 46 | 12 | 6 | 28 | 43 | 87 | −44 | 42 | Relegation to Football League One |

Updated to match(es) played on 7 May 2011. Source: The Football League
Rules for classification: 1) points; 2) goal difference; 3) number of goals scored.
(C) Champions; (O) Play-off winners; (P) Promoted; (R) Relegated

== Play-offs ==
Semi-finals
3 | Swansea City | 0 | 3 | 3
6 | Nottingham Forest | 0 | 1 | 1
4 | Cardiff City | 0 | 0 | 0
5 | Reading | 0 | 3 | 3

Final
3 | Swansea City | 4
5 | Reading | 2

=== Semi-finals ===
12 May 2011
19:45

| Nottingham Forest | 0–0 | Swansea City |
|---|---|---|
| | Report |

City Ground, Nottingham
Attendance: 27,881
Referee: Mike Dean
16 May 2011
19:45

| Swansea City | 3–1 | Nottingham Forest |
|---|---|---|
| Britton 28'; Dobbie 33'; Pratley 90+3' | Report | Earnshaw 80' |

Liberty Stadium, Swansea
Attendance: 19,816
Referee: Andre Marriner

Swansea City won 3 – 1 on aggregate.

13 May 2011
19:45

| Reading | 0–0 | Cardiff City |
|---|---|---|
| | Report |

Madejski Stadium, Reading
Attendance: 21,485
Referee: Mark Halsey
17 May 2011
19:45

| Cardiff City | 0–3 | Reading |
|---|---|---|
| | Report | Long 28', 45' (pen.); McAnuff 84' |

Cardiff City Stadium, Cardiff
Attendance: 24,081
Referee: Howard Webb

Reading won 3 – 0 on aggregate.

=== Final ===
30 May 2011
15:00

| Reading | 2–4 | Swansea City |
|---|---|---|
| Allen 49' (o.g.); Mills 57' | Report | Sinclair 21' (pen.), 22', 80' (pen.); Dobbie 40' |

Wembley Stadium, London
Attendance: 86,581
Referee: Phil Dowd

== Results ==
The fixtures for the Championship were released on 17 June 2010. The season kick-off was announced for 6 August 2010 and it concluded on 7 May 2011.

| Home \ Away | BAR | BRI | BUR | CAR | COV | CRY | DER | DON | HUL | IPS | LEE | LEI | MID | MIL | NWC | NOT | POR | PNE | QPR | REA | SCU | SHU | SWA | WAT |
|---|---|---|---|---|---|---|---|---|---|---|---|---|---|---|---|---|---|---|---|---|---|---|---|---|
| Barnsley | | 4–2 | 1–2 | 1–2 | 2–1 | 1–0 | 1–1 | 2–2 | 1–1 | 1–1 | 5–2 | 0–2 | 2–0 | 1–0 | 0–2 | 3–1 | 1–0 | 2–0 | 0–1 | 0–1 | 2–1 | 1–0 | 1–1 | 0–0 |
| Bristol City | 3–3 | | 2–0 | 3–0 | 1–2 | 1–1 | 2–0 | 1–0 | 3–0 | 0–1 | 0–2 | 2–0 | 0–4 | 0–3 | 0–3 | 2–3 | 2–1 | 1–1 | 1–1 | 1–0 | 2–0 | 3–0 | 0–2 | 0–2 |
| Burnley | 3–0 | 0–0 | | 1–1 | 2–2 | 1–0 | 2–1 | 1–1 | 4–0 | 1–2 | 2–3 | 3–0 | 3–1 | 0–3 | 2–1 | 1–0 | 1–1 | 4–3 | 0–0 | 0–4 | 0–2 | 4–2 | 2–1 | 3–2 |
| Cardiff City | 2–2 | 3–2 | 1–1 | | 2–0 | 0–0 | 4–1 | 4–0 | 2–0 | 0–2 | 2–1 | 2–0 | 0–3 | 2–1 | 3–1 | 0–2 | 3–0 | 1–1 | 2–2 | 2–2 | 1–0 | 1–1 | 0–1 | 4–2 |
| Coventry City | 3–0 | 1–4 | 1–0 | 1–2 | | 2–1 | 2–1 | 2–1 | 0–1 | 1–1 | 2–3 | 1–1 | 1–0 | 2–1 | 1–2 | 1–2 | 2–0 | 1–2 | 0–2 | 0–0 | 1–1 | 0–0 | 0–1 | 2–0 |
| Crystal Palace | 2–1 | 0–0 | 0–0 | 1–0 | 2–0 | | 2–2 | 1–0 | 0–0 | 1–2 | 1–0 | 3–2 | 1–0 | 0–1 | 0–0 | 0–3 | 4–1 | 1–0 | 1–2 | 3–3 | 1–2 | 1–0 | 0–3 | 3–2 |
| Derby County | 0–0 | 0–2 | 2–4 | 1–2 | 2–2 | 5–0 | | 1–3 | 0–1 | 1–2 | 2–1 | 0–2 | 3–1 | 0–0 | 1–2 | 0–1 | 2–0 | 3–0 | 2–2 | 1–2 | 3–2 | 0–1 | 2–1 | 4–1 |
| Doncaster Rovers | 0–2 | 1–1 | 1–0 | 1–3 | 1–1 | 0–0 | 2–3 | | 3–1 | 0–6 | 0–0 | 1–1 | 2–1 | 2–1 | 3–1 | 1–1 | 0–2 | 1–1 | 0–1 | 0–3 | 3–0 | 2–0 | 1–1 | 1–1 |
| Hull City | 2–0 | 2–0 | 0–1 | 0–2 | 0–0 | 1–1 | 2–0 | 3–1 | | 1–0 | 2–2 | 0–1 | 2–4 | 0–1 | 1–1 | 0–0 | 1–2 | 1–0 | 0–0 | 1–1 | 0–1 | 0–1 | 2–0 | 0–0 |
| Ipswich Town | 1–3 | 2–0 | 1–1 | 2–0 | 1–2 | 2–1 | 0–2 | 3–2 | 1–1 | | 2–1 | 3–0 | 3–3 | 2–0 | 1–5 | 0–1 | 0–2 | 2–1 | 0–3 | 1–3 | 2–0 | 3–0 | 1–3 | 0–3 |
| Leeds United | 3–3 | 3–1 | 1–0 | 0–4 | 1–0 | 2–1 | 1–2 | 5–2 | 2–2 | 0–0 | | 1–2 | 1–1 | 3–1 | 2–2 | 4–1 | 3–3 | 4–6 | 2–0 | 0–0 | 4–0 | 1–0 | 2–1 | 2–2 |
| Leicester City | 4–1 | 2–1 | 4–0 | 2–1 | 1–1 | 1–1 | 2–0 | 5–1 | 1–1 | 4–2 | 2–2 | | 0–0 | 4–2 | 2–3 | 1–0 | 0–1 | 1–0 | 0–2 | 1–2 | 3–1 | 2–2 | 2–1 | 4–2 |
| Middlesbrough | 1–1 | 1–2 | 2–1 | 1–0 | 2–1 | 2–1 | 2–1 | 3–0 | 2–2 | 1–3 | 1–2 | 3–3 | | 0–1 | 1–1 | 1–1 | 2–2 | 1–1 | 0–3 | 3–1 | 2–0 | 1–0 | 3–4 | 2–1 |
| Millwall | 2–0 | 0–0 | 1–1 | 3–3 | 3–1 | 3–0 | 2–0 | 1–0 | 4–0 | 2–1 | 3–2 | 2–0 | 2–3 | | 1–1 | 0–0 | 0–1 | 4–0 | 2–0 | 0–0 | 3–0 | 0–1 | 0–2 | 1–6 |
| Norwich City | 2–1 | 3–1 | 2–2 | 1–1 | 2–2 | 1–2 | 3–2 | 1–1 | 0–2 | 4–1 | 1–1 | 4–3 | 1–0 | 2–1 | | 2–1 | 0–2 | 1–1 | 1–0 | 2–1 | 6–0 | 4–2 | 2–0 | 2–3 |
| Nottingham Forest | 2–2 | 1–0 | 2–0 | 2–1 | 2–1 | 3–0 | 5–2 | 0–0 | 0–1 | 2–0 | 1–1 | 3–2 | 1–0 | 1–1 | 1–1 | | 2–1 | 2–2 | 0–0 | 3–4 | 5–1 | 1–1 | 3–1 | 1–0 |
| Portsmouth | 1–0 | 3–1 | 1–2 | 0–2 | 0–3 | 1–0 | 1–1 | 2–3 | 2–3 | 0–0 | 2–2 | 6–1 | 0–0 | 1–1 | 0–1 | 2–1 | | 1–1 | 1–1 | 1–1 | 2–0 | 1–0 | 0–0 | 3–2 |
| Preston North End | 1–2 | 0–4 | 1–2 | 0–1 | 2–1 | 4–3 | 1–2 | 0–2 | 0–2 | 1–0 | 1–2 | 1–1 | 1–3 | 0–0 | 0–1 | 1–2 | 1–0 | | 1–1 | 1–1 | 2–3 | 3–1 | 2–1 | 3–1 |
| Queens Park Rangers | 4–0 | 2–2 | 1–1 | 2–1 | 2–1 | 2–1 | 0–0 | 3–0 | 1–1 | 2–0 | 1–2 | 1–0 | 3–0 | 0–0 | 0–0 | 1–1 | 2–0 | 3–1 | | 3–1 | 2–0 | 3–0 | 4–0 | 1–3 |
| Reading | 3–0 | 4–1 | 2–1 | 1–1 | 0–0 | 3–0 | 2–1 | 4–3 | 1–1 | 1–0 | 0–0 | 3–1 | 5–2 | 2–1 | 3–3 | 1–1 | 2–0 | 2–1 | 0–1 | | 1–2 | 2–3 | 0–1 | 1–1 |
| Scunthorpe United | 0–0 | 0–2 | 0–0 | 2–4 | 0–2 | 3–0 | 0–0 | 1–3 | 1–5 | 1–1 | 1–4 | 0–3 | 0–2 | 1–2 | 0–1 | 1–0 | 1–1 | 0–3 | 4–1 | 0–2 | | 3–2 | 1–0 | 1–2 |
| Sheffield United | 2–2 | 3–2 | 3–3 | 0–2 | 0–1 | 3–2 | 0–1 | 2–2 | 2–3 | 1–2 | 2–0 | 0–1 | 1–2 | 1–1 | 1–2 | 2–1 | 1–0 | 1–0 | 0–3 | 1–1 | 0–4 | | 1–0 | 0–1 |
| Swansea City | 1–0 | 0–1 | 1–0 | 0–1 | 2–1 | 3–0 | 0–0 | 3–0 | 1–1 | 4–1 | 3–0 | 2–0 | 1–0 | 1–1 | 3–0 | 3–2 | 1–2 | 4–0 | 0–0 | 1–0 | 2–0 | 4–0 | | 1–1 |
| Watford | 1–0 | 1–3 | 1–3 | 4–1 | 2–2 | 1–1 | 3–0 | 2–2 | 1–2 | 2–1 | 0–1 | 3–2 | 3–1 | 1–0 | 2–2 | 1–1 | 3–0 | 2–2 | 0–2 | 1–1 | 0–2 | 3–0 | 2–3 | |

Updated to match(es) played on 7 May 2011. Source: The Football League
Legend: Blue = home team win; Yellow = draw; Red = away team win.

== Season statistics ==
=== Top scorers ===
| Rank | Player | Club | Goals |
|---|---|---|---|
| 1 | (England) Danny Graham | Watford | 24 |
| 2 | (England) Grant Holt | Norwich City | 21 |
| 2 | (Republic of Ireland) Shane Long | Reading | 21 |
| 4 | (Argentina) Luciano Becchio | Leeds United | 19 |
| 4 | (Morocco) Adel Taarabt | Queens Park Rangers | 19 |
| 4 | (England) Scott Sinclair | Swansea City | 19 |
| 7 | (England) Jay Bothroyd | Cardiff City | 18 |
| 7 | (Ivory Coast) Max Gradel | Leeds United | 18 |
| 9 | (England) Billy Sharp | Doncaster Rovers | 15 |
| 9 | (Wales) Andy King | Leicester City | 15 |
| 9 | (Wales) Steve Morison | Millwall | 15 |

=== Top assists ===
| Rank | Player | Club | Assists |
|---|---|---|---|
| 1 | (Morocco) Adel Taarabt | Queens Park Rangers | 19 |
| 2 | (England) Grant Holt | Norwich City | 14 |
| 3 | (Scotland) Don Cowie | Watford | 13 |
| 4 | (England) Lewis McGugan | Nottingham Forest | 12 |
| 5 | (Ghana) Albert Adomah | Bristol City | 11 |
| 5 | (Wales) Craig Bellamy | Cardiff City | 11 |
| 7 | (Republic of Ireland) Shane Long | Reading | 10 |
| 7 | (England) Peter Whittingham | Cardiff City | 10 |
| 10 | (Argentina) Luciano Becchio | Leeds United | 9 |
| 10 | (Scotland) Chris Burke | Cardiff City | 9 |
| 10 | (England) James Coppinger | Doncaster Rovers | 9 |
| 10 | (England) Chris Eagles | Burnley | 9 |
| 10 | (England) David Fox | Norwich City | 9 |
| 10 | (England) Danny Graham | Watford | 9 |
| 10 | (England) James Henry | Millwall | 9 |
| 10 | (Republic of Ireland) Wes Hoolahan | Norwich City | 9 |
| 10 | (Republic of Ireland) Keith Treacy | Preston North End | 9 |

=== Hat-tricks ===
| Player | For | Against | Result | Date |
|---|---|---|---|---|
| (Scotland) Chris Iwelumo | Burnley | Preston North End | 4–3 | 11 September 2010 |
| (England) James Vaughan | Crystal Palace | Portsmouth | 4–1 | 14 September 2010 |
| (England) James Coppinger | Doncaster Rovers | Norwich City | 3–1 | 14 September 2010 |
| (England) Jon Parkin | Preston North End | Leeds United | 6–4 | 28 September 2010 |
| (England) Jonny Howson | Leeds United | Scunthorpe United | 4–1 | 30 October 2010 |
| (Argentina) Luciano Becchio | Leeds United | Bristol City | 3–1 | 13 November 2010 |
| (England) Grant Holt | Norwich City | Ipswich Town | 4–1 | 28 November 2010 |
| (Republic of Ireland) Wes Hoolahan | Norwich City | Sheffield United | 4–2 | 28 December 2010 |
| (England) Jason Puncheon | Millwall | Crystal Palace | 3–0 | 1 January 2011 |
| (England) Matty Fryatt | Hull City | Scunthorpe United | 5–1 | 5 February 2011 |
| (England) Connor Wickham | Ipswich Town | Doncaster Rovers | 6–0 | 15 February 2011 |
| (Nigeria) Yakubu | Leicester City | Middlesbrough | 3–3 | 2 April 2011 |
| (England) Grant Holt | Norwich City | Scunthorpe United | 6–0 | 2 April 2011 |
| (Canada) Simeon Jackson | Norwich City | Scunthorpe United | 6–0 | 2 April 2011 |
| (Australia) Scott McDonald | Middlesbrough | Hull City | 4–2 | 23 April 2011 |
| (Canada) Simeon Jackson | Norwich City | Derby County | 3–2 | 25 April 2011 |

=== Scoring ===
- First goal of the season: John Eustace for Watford against Norwich City (6 August 2010)
- Highest scoring game: 10 goals – Leeds United 4–6 Preston North End (28 September 2010)
- Most goals scored in a game by one team: 6 goals
  - Millwall 1–6 Watford (18 September 2010)
  - Portsmouth 6–1 Leicester City (24 September 2010)
  - Leeds United 4–6 Preston North End (28 September 2010)
  - Doncaster Rovers 0–6 Ipswich Town (15 February 2011)
  - Norwich City 6–0 Scunthorpe United (2 April 2011)
- Widest winning margin: 6 goals
  - Doncaster Rovers 0–6 Ipswich Town (15 February 2011)
  - Norwich City 6–0 Scunthorpe United (2 April 2011)
- Fewest games failed to score in: 5 – Norwich City
- Most games failed to score in: 21 – Scunthorpe United

=== Discipline ===
- Most yellow cards (club): 86 – Leeds United
- Most yellow cards (player): 12
  - Robbie Savage (Derby County)
- Most red cards (club): 13 – Sheffield United
- Most red cards (player): 2
  - Matthew Connolly (Queens Park Rangers)
  - Claude Davis (Crystal Palace)
  - Alan Dunne (Millwall)
  - Marlon King (Coventry City)
  - Shane Lowry (Sheffield United)
  - Dean Moxey (Derby County & Crystal Palace)
  - Ricardo Rocha (Portsmouth)
  - Jamie Ward (Sheffield United & Derby County)
  - Lee Williamson (Sheffield United)
- Most fouls (club): 554 – Leeds United
- Most fouls (player): 103 – Grant Holt (Norwich City)

=== Clean sheets ===
- Most clean sheets: 25 – Queens Park Rangers
- Fewest clean sheets: 4 – Preston North End

== Monthly awards ==
| Month | Manager of the Month | | Player of the Month | | Notes |
| Month | Manager | Club | Player | Club | Notes |
|---|---|---|---|---|---|
| August | (England) Neil Warnock | Queens Park Rangers | (Morocco) Adel Taarabt | Queens Park Rangers | |
| September | (England) Neil Warnock | Queens Park Rangers | (Scotland) Jamie Mackie | Queens Park Rangers | |
| October | (England) Dave Jones | Cardiff City | (England) Jay Bothroyd | Cardiff City | |
| November | (England) Keith Millen | Bristol City | (England) James Hayter | Doncaster Rovers | |
| December | (England) Simon Grayson | Leeds United | (England) Danny Graham | Watford | |
| January | (Scotland) Billy Davies | Nottingham Forest | (England) Richie Wellens | Leicester City | |
| February | (Northern Ireland) Brendan Rodgers | Swansea City | (England) Connor Wickham | Ipswich Town | |
| March | (Scotland) Malky Mackay | Watford | (Republic of Ireland) Ian Harte | Reading | |
| April | (England) Brian McDermott | Reading | (Canada) Simeon Jackson | Norwich City | |

== Team of the year ==
| Position | Name | Club |
|---|---|---|
| GK | (Republic of Ireland) Paddy Kenny | Queens Park Rangers |
| RB | (England) Kyle Naughton | Leicester City |
| CB | (England) Wes Morgan | Nottingham Forest |
| CB | (Wales) Ashley Williams | Swansea City |
| LB | (Republic of Ireland) Ian Harte | Reading |
| RM | (Morocco) Adel Taarabt | Queens Park Rangers |
| CM | (Wales) Andy King | Leicester City |
| CM | (Republic of Ireland) Wes Hoolahan | Norwich City |
| LM | (England) Scott Sinclair | Swansea City |
| ST | (England) Grant Holt | Norwich City |
| ST | (England) Danny Graham | Watford |

== Attendances ==
| No. | Club | Average | Change | Highest | Lowest |
|---|---|---|---|---|---|
| 1 | Leeds United | 27,299 | 10.0% | 33,622 | 20,747 |
| 2 | Derby County | 26,023 | -11.0% | 33,010 | 23,159 |
| 3 | Norwich City | 25,386 | 2.9% | 26,532 | 23,852 |
| 4 | Leicester City | 23,666 | -1.2% | 30,919 | 19,611 |
| 5 | Nottingham Forest | 23,275 | -2.3% | 29,490 | 19,411 |
| 6 | Cardiff City | 23,194 | 12.0% | 26,058 | 20,573 |
| 7 | Hull City | 21,169 | -13.2% | 24,110 | 19,714 |
| 8 | Sheffield United | 20,632 | -17.9% | 23,728 | 17,496 |
| 9 | Ipswich Town | 19,615 | -5.9% | 29,258 | 16,728 |
| 10 | Reading | 17,682 | 1.6% | 23,677 | 14,029 |
| 11 | Coventry City | 16,310 | -5.8% | 28,184 | 12,292 |
| 12 | Middlesbrough | 16,269 | -18.4% | 23,550 | 13,712 |
| 13 | Portsmouth | 15,707 | -13.9% | 20,040 | 13,132 |
| 14 | Queens Park Rangers | 15,635 | 17.1% | 18,234 | 12,046 |
| 15 | Swansea City | 15,507 | 0.6% | 19,309 | 12,411 |
| 16 | Crystal Palace | 15,351 | 3.9% | 20,142 | 12,353 |
| 17 | Burnley | 14,931 | -27.7% | 20,453 | 13,655 |
| 18 | Bristol City | 14,605 | 0.0% | 18,308 | 13,376 |
| 19 | Watford | 13,152 | -8.3% | 15,538 | 10,620 |
| 20 | Millwall | 12,439 | 14.8% | 16,724 | 8,937 |
| 21 | Barnsley | 11,856 | -8.6% | 20,309 | 10,250 |
| 22 | Preston North End | 11,768 | -9.0% | 18,417 | 8,994 |
| 23 | Doncaster Rovers | 10,258 | -6.7% | 14,312 | 7,921 |
| 24 | Scunthorpe United | 5,548 | -14.2% | 8,122 | 4,190 |
