= 2011–12 Football League Championship =

Football League Championship
- Season: 2011–12
- Champions: Reading; 2nd Championship title 2nd 2nd tier title
- Promoted: Reading F.C. Southampton F.C. West Ham United F.C.
- Relegated: Doncaster Rovers; Coventry City; Portsmouth
- Matches: 552
- Goals: 1,419 (2.57 per match)
- Top goalscorer: Rickie Lambert (27 goals)
- Biggest home win: Peterborough United 7–1 Ipswich Town; West Ham 6–0 Brighton & Hove Albion
- Biggest away win: Millwall 0–6 Birmingham City
- Highest scoring: Leeds United 3–7 Nottingham Forest (10 goals)
- Longest winning run: 8 games Reading
- Longest unbeaten run: 12 games Southampton; Brighton
- Longest winless run: 11 games Coventry City
- Longest losing run: 7 games Ipswich Town
- Highest attendance: 34,934; West Ham 2–1 Hull City
- Lowest attendance: 6,351; Peterborough United 4–3 Cardiff City
- Average attendance: 17,841

The 2011–12 Football League Championship (known as the npower Championship for sponsorship reasons) was the eighth season of the league under its current title and nineteenth season under its current league division format.

Reading secured the Championship title on 21 April, following second-placed Southampton's 2–1 defeat to Middlesbrough. The result left Southampton four points behind Reading with only one game remaining. Southampton were promoted on the final day of the season, after winning 4–0 at home to Coventry City, who were one of three teams relegated along with Portsmouth (who were deducted ten points midway through the season for entering administration) and Doncaster Rovers. West Ham United occupied the final promotion place as they returned to the Premier League after just one year. West Ham beat Blackpool in the Play-off final at Wembley Stadium, sealing their return to the top division after narrowly missing out on automatic promotion.

== Changes from last season ==
=== Team changes ===
==== From Championship ====
Promoted to Premier League

- Queens Park Rangers
- Norwich City
- Swansea City

Relegated to League One

- Sheffield United
- Scunthorpe United
- Preston North End

==== To Championship ====
Relegated from Premier League

- West Ham United
- Blackpool
- Birmingham City

Promoted from League One

- Brighton & Hove Albion
- Southampton
- Peterborough United

=== Rule changes ===
- The Football Association and the Football Association of Wales will now both decide on disciplinary action for Welsh clubs in the Premier League and the Football League.
- Only five substitutes can be named on match days, reduced from last season's seven named substitutes.

== Team overview ==
=== Stadia and locations ===
Locations of teams in the 2011–12 Football League Championship

| Team | Location | Stadium | Capacity |
|---|---|---|---|
| Barnsley | Barnsley | Oakwell | 23,009 |
| Birmingham City | Birmingham | St Andrew's | 30,079 |
| Blackpool | Blackpool | Bloomfield Road | 16,220 |
| Brighton & Hove Albion | Brighton | Falmer Stadium | 22,374 |
| Bristol City | Bristol | Ashton Gate | 21,497 |
| Burnley | Burnley | Turf Moor | 22,546 |
| Cardiff City | Cardiff | Cardiff City Stadium | 26,828 |
| Coventry City | Coventry | Ricoh Arena | 32,609 |
| Crystal Palace | London | Selhurst Park | 26,309 |
| Derby County | Derby | Pride Park Stadium | 33,597 |
| Doncaster Rovers | Doncaster | Keepmoat Stadium | 15,231 |
| Hull City | Kingston upon Hull | KC Stadium | 25,404 |
| Ipswich Town | Ipswich | Portman Road | 30,311 |
| Leeds United | Leeds | Elland Road | 39,460 |
| Leicester City | Leicester | King Power Stadium | 32,500 |
| Middlesbrough | Middlesbrough | Riverside Stadium | 34,988 |
| Millwall | London | The Den | 20,146 |
| Nottingham Forest | Nottingham | City Ground | 30,576 |
| Peterborough United | Peterborough | London Road Stadium | 15,460 |
| Portsmouth | Portsmouth | Fratton Park | 20,224 |
| Reading | Reading | Madejski Stadium | 24,224 |
| Southampton | Southampton | St Mary's Stadium | 32,689 |
| Watford | Watford | Vicarage Road | 23,500 |
| West Ham United | London | Boleyn Ground | 35,303 |

=== Personnel and sponsoring ===
| Team | Manager | Chairman | Team captain | Kit maker | Sponsor |
|---|---|---|---|---|---|
| Barnsley | Keith Hill | Patrick Cryne | Jacob Butterfield | Nike | C.K. Beckett |
| Birmingham City | Chris Hughton | Vico Hui | Stephen Carr | Xtep | RationalFX |
| Blackpool | Ian Holloway | Karl Oyston | Barry Ferguson | Fila | Wonga.com |
| Brighton & Hove Albion | Gus Poyet | Tony Bloom | Gordon Greer | Errea | BrightonandHoveJobs.com |
| Bristol City | Derek McInnes | Colin Sexstone | Louis Carey | adidas | RSG (Home) & Bristol City Community Trust (Away) |
| Burnley | Eddie Howe | Barry Kilby | Chris McCann | Puma | Fun88 |
| Cardiff City | Malky Mackay | Datuk Chan Tien Ghee | Mark Hudson | Puma | Malaysia |
| Coventry City | Andy Thorn | Vacant | Sammy Clingan | Puma | City Link |
| Crystal Palace | Dougie Freedman | Steve Parish; Martin Long | Paddy McCarthy | Nike | GAC Logistics |
| Derby County | Nigel Clough | Andrew Appleby | Shaun Barker | adidas | buymobiles.net |
| Doncaster Rovers | Dean Saunders | John Ryan | Brian Stock | Nike | One Call Insurance |
| Hull City | Steve Bruce | Assem Allam | Jack Hobbs | adidas | Cash Converters |
| Ipswich Town | Paul Jewell | Marcus Evans | Grant Leadbitter | Mitre | Marcus Evans |
| Leeds United | Neil Warnock | Ken Bates | Robert Snodgrass | Macron | Enterprise Insurance |
| Leicester City | Nigel Pearson | Vichai Raksriaksorn | Matt Mills | BURRDA | King Power (Front), Amazing Thailand (Back) |
| Middlesbrough | Tony Mowbray | Steve Gibson | Matthew Bates | adidas | Ramsdens |
| Millwall | Kenny Jackett | John Berylson | Paul Robinson | Macron | racing+ |
| Nottingham Forest | Sean O'Driscoll | Nigel Doughty; Frank Clark | Dan Harding | Umbro | John Pye & Sons Auctioneers |
| Peterborough United | Darren Ferguson | Darragh MacAnthony | Grant McCann | Nike | Energy Park Peterborough |
| Portsmouth | Michael Appleton | Under Administration | Liam Lawrence | Kappa | Jobsite |
| Reading | Brian McDermott | John Madejski | Jobi McAnuff | Puma | Waitrose |
| Southampton | Nigel Adkins | Nicola Cortese | Dean Hammond | Umbro | aap^{3} |
| Watford | Gianfranco Zola | Gino Pozzo | John Eustace | BURRDA | BURRDA |
| West Ham United | Sam Allardyce | David Sullivan; David Gold | Kevin Nolan | Macron | SBOBET |

==== Managerial changes ====
| Team | Outgoing manager | Manner of departure | Date of vacancy | Position in table | Incoming manager | Date of appointment |
|---|---|---|---|---|---|---|
| Barnsley | (England) Mark Robins | Resigned | 15 May 2011 | Pre-season | (England) Keith Hill | 1 June 2011 |
| West Ham United | (Israel) Avram Grant | Sacked | 15 May 2011 | Pre-season | (England) Sam Allardyce | 1 June 2011 |
| Cardiff City | (England) Dave Jones | Sacked | 30 May 2011 | Pre-season | (Scotland) Malky Mackay | 17 June 2011 |
| Nottingham Forest | (Scotland) Billy Davies | Sacked | 12 June 2011 | Pre-season | (England) Steve McClaren | 13 June 2011 |
| Birmingham City | (Scotland) Alex McLeish | Signed by Aston Villa | 17 June 2011 | Pre-season | (Republic of Ireland) Chris Hughton | 22 June 2011 |
| Watford | (Scotland) Malky Mackay | Signed by Cardiff City | 17 June 2011 | Pre-season | (England) Sean Dyche | 21 June 2011 |
| Doncaster Rovers | (England) Sean O'Driscoll | Sacked | 23 September 2011 | 24th | (Wales) Dean Saunders | 23 September 2011 |
| Nottingham Forest | (England) Steve McClaren | Resigned | 2 October 2011 | 21st | (England) Steve Cotterill | 14 October 2011 |
| Bristol City | (England) Keith Millen | Mutual consent | 3 October 2011 | 24th | (Scotland) Derek McInnes | 19 October 2011 |
| Portsmouth | (England) Steve Cotterill | Signed by Nottingham Forest | 14 October 2011 | 18th | (England) Michael Appleton | 10 November 2011 |
| Leicester City | (Sweden) Sven-Göran Eriksson | Mutual consent | 24 October 2011 | 13th | (England) Nigel Pearson | 15 November 2011 |
| Hull City | (England) Nigel Pearson | Signed by Leicester City | 15 November 2011 | 9th | (England) Nick Barmby | 10 January 2012 |
| Leeds United | (England) Simon Grayson | Sacked | 1 February 2012 | 10th | (England) Neil Warnock | 18 February 2012 |
| Hull City | (England) Nick Barmby | Sacked | 8 May 2012 | Pre-season | (England) Steve Bruce | 8 June 2012 |
| Birmingham City | (Republic of Ireland) Chris Hughton | Signed by Norwich City | 7 June 2012 | Pre-season | (England) Lee Clark | 26 June 2012 |
| Watford | (England) Sean Dyche | Sacked | 2 July 2012 | Pre-season | (Italy) Gianfranco Zola | 7 July 2012 |

=== Ownership changes ===
| Team | New owner | Previous owner | Effective date |
|---|---|---|---|
| Portsmouth | Convers Sport Initiatives | Balram Chainrai | 1 June 2011 |
| Portsmouth | Administration | Convers Sport Initiatives | 29 November 2011 |

== League table ==
| Pos | Team | Pld | W | D | L | GF | GA | GD | Pts | Promotion or relegation |
|---|---|---|---|---|---|---|---|---|---|---|
| 1 | Reading (C, P) | 46 | 27 | 8 | 11 | 69 | 41 | +28 | 89 | Promotion to the Premier League |
| 2 | Southampton (P) | 46 | 26 | 10 | 10 | 85 | 46 | +39 | 88 | Promotion to the Premier League |
| 3 | West Ham United (O, P) | 46 | 24 | 14 | 8 | 81 | 48 | +33 | 86 | Qualification for Championship play-offs |
| 4 | Birmingham City | 46 | 20 | 16 | 10 | 78 | 51 | +27 | 76 | Qualification for Championship play-offs |
| 5 | Blackpool | 46 | 20 | 15 | 11 | 79 | 59 | +20 | 75 | Qualification for Championship play-offs |
| 6 | Cardiff City | 46 | 19 | 18 | 9 | 66 | 53 | +13 | 75 | Qualification for Championship play-offs |
| 7 | Middlesbrough | 46 | 18 | 16 | 12 | 52 | 51 | +1 | 70 | |
| 8 | Hull City | 46 | 19 | 11 | 16 | 47 | 44 | +3 | 68 | |
| 9 | Leicester City | 46 | 18 | 12 | 16 | 66 | 55 | +11 | 66 | |
| 10 | Brighton & Hove Albion | 46 | 17 | 15 | 14 | 52 | 52 | 0 | 66 | |
| 11 | Watford | 46 | 16 | 16 | 14 | 56 | 64 | −8 | 64 | |
| 12 | Derby County | 46 | 18 | 10 | 18 | 50 | 58 | −8 | 64 | |
| 13 | Burnley | 46 | 17 | 11 | 18 | 61 | 58 | +3 | 62 | |
| 14 | Leeds United | 46 | 17 | 10 | 19 | 65 | 68 | −3 | 61 | |
| 15 | Ipswich Town | 46 | 17 | 10 | 19 | 69 | 77 | −8 | 61 | |
| 16 | Millwall | 46 | 15 | 12 | 19 | 55 | 57 | −2 | 57 | |
| 17 | Crystal Palace | 46 | 13 | 17 | 16 | 46 | 51 | −5 | 56 | |
| 18 | Peterborough United | 46 | 13 | 11 | 22 | 67 | 77 | −10 | 50 | |
| 19 | Nottingham Forest | 46 | 14 | 8 | 24 | 48 | 63 | −15 | 50 | |
| 20 | Bristol City | 46 | 12 | 13 | 21 | 44 | 68 | −24 | 49 | |
| 21 | Barnsley | 46 | 13 | 9 | 24 | 49 | 74 | −25 | 48 | |
| 22 | Portsmouth (R) | 46 | 13 | 11 | 22 | 50 | 59 | −9 | 40 (Note: Portsmouth were deducted 10 points for entering administration.) | Relegation to League One |
| 23 | Coventry City (R) | 46 | 9 | 13 | 24 | 41 | 65 | −24 | 40 | Relegation to League One |
| 24 | Doncaster Rovers (R) | 46 | 8 | 12 | 26 | 43 | 80 | −37 | 36 | Relegation to League One |

Updated to match(es) played on 28 April 2012. Source: BBC Sport
Rules for classification: 1) points; 2) goal difference; 3) number of goals scored.
(C) Champions; (O) Play-off winners; (P) Promoted; (R) Relegated

== Play-offs ==
Semi-finals
3 | West Ham United | 2 | 3 | 5
6 | Cardiff City | 0 | 0 | 0
4 | Birmingham City | 0 | 2 | 2
5 | Blackpool | 1 | 2 | 3

Final
3 | West Ham United | 2
5 | Blackpool | 1

== Results ==
The fixtures for the Championship were released on 17 June 2011. The season kicked off on 5 August 2011 and concluded on 28 April 2012.

| Home \ Away | BAR | BIR | BLP | B&HA | BRI | BUR | CAR | COV | CRY | DER | DON | HUL | IPS | LEE | LEI | MID | MIL | NOT | PET | POR | REA | SOU | WAT | WHU |
|---|---|---|---|---|---|---|---|---|---|---|---|---|---|---|---|---|---|---|---|---|---|---|---|---|
| Barnsley | | 1–3 | 1–3 | 0–0 | 1–2 | 2–0 | 0–1 | 2–0 | 2–1 | 3–2 | 2–0 | 2–1 | 3–5 | 4–1 | 1–1 | 1–3 | 1–3 | 1–1 | 1–0 | 2–0 | 0–4 | 0–1 | 1–1 | 0–4 |
| Birmingham City | 1–1 | | 3–0 | 0–0 | 2–2 | 2–1 | 1–1 | 1–0 | 3–1 | 2–2 | 2–1 | 0–0 | 2–1 | 1–0 | 2–0 | 3–0 | 3–0 | 1–2 | 1–1 | 1–0 | 2–0 | 0–0 | 3–0 | 1–1 |
| Blackpool | 1–1 | 2–2 | | 3–1 | 5–0 | 4–0 | 1–1 | 2–1 | 2–1 | 0–1 | 2–1 | 1–1 | 2–0 | 1–0 | 3–3 | 3–0 | 1–0 | 1–2 | 2–1 | 1–1 | 1–0 | 3–0 | 0–0 | 1–4 |
| Brighton & Hove Albion | 2–0 | 1–1 | 2–2 | | 2–0 | 0–1 | 2–2 | 2–1 | 1–3 | 2–0 | 2–1 | 0–0 | 3–0 | 3–3 | 1–0 | 1–1 | 2–2 | 1–0 | 2–0 | 2–0 | 0–1 | 3–0 | 2–2 | 0–1 |
| Bristol City | 2–0 | 0–2 | 1–3 | 0–1 | | 3–1 | 1–2 | 3–1 | 2–2 | 1–1 | 2–1 | 1–1 | 0–3 | 0–3 | 3–2 | 0–1 | 1–0 | 0–0 | 1–2 | 0–0 | 2–3 | 2–0 | 0–2 | 1–1 |
| Burnley | 2–0 | 1–3 | 3–1 | 1–0 | 1–1 | | 1–1 | 1–1 | 1–1 | 0–0 | 3–0 | 1–0 | 4–0 | 1–2 | 1–3 | 0–2 | 1–3 | 5–1 | 1–1 | 0–1 | 0–1 | 1–1 | 2–2 | 2–2 |
| Cardiff City | 5–3 | 1–0 | 1–3 | 1–3 | 3–1 | 0–0 | | 2–2 | 2–0 | 2–0 | 2–0 | 0–3 | 2–2 | 1–1 | 0–0 | 2–3 | 0–0 | 1–0 | 3–1 | 3–2 | 3–1 | 2–1 | 1–1 | 0–2 |
| Coventry City | 1–0 | 1–1 | 2–2 | 2–0 | 1–0 | 1–2 | 1–1 | | 1–1 | 2–0 | 0–2 | 0–1 | 2–3 | 2–1 | 0–1 | 3–1 | 0–1 | 1–0 | 2–2 | 2–0 | 1–1 | 2–4 | 0–0 | 1–2 |
| Crystal Palace | 1–0 | 1–0 | 1–1 | 1–1 | 1–0 | 2–0 | 1–2 | 2–1 | | 1–1 | 1–1 | 0–0 | 1–1 | 1–1 | 1–2 | 0–1 | 0–0 | 0–3 | 1–0 | 0–0 | 0–0 | 0–2 | 4–0 | 2–2 |
| Derby County | 1–1 | 2–1 | 2–1 | 0–1 | 2–1 | 1–2 | 0–3 | 1–0 | 3–2 | | 3–0 | 0–2 | 0–0 | 1–0 | 0–1 | 0–1 | 3–0 | 1–0 | 1–1 | 3–1 | 0–1 | 1–1 | 1–2 | 2–1 |
| Doncaster Rovers | 2–0 | 1–3 | 1–3 | 1–1 | 1–1 | 1–2 | 0–0 | 1–1 | 1–0 | 1–2 | | 1–1 | 2–3 | 0–3 | 2–1 | 1–3 | 0–3 | 0–1 | 1–1 | 3–4 | 1–1 | 1–0 | 0–0 | 0–1 |
| Hull City | 3–1 | 2–1 | 0–1 | 0–0 | 3–0 | 2–3 | 2–1 | 0–2 | 0–1 | 0–1 | 0–0 | | 2–2 | 0–0 | 2–1 | 2–1 | 2–0 | 2–1 | 1–0 | 1–0 | 1–0 | 0–2 | 3–2 | 0–2 |
| Ipswich Town | 1–0 | 1–1 | 2–2 | 3–1 | 3–0 | 1–0 | 3–0 | 3–0 | 0–1 | 1–0 | 2–3 | 0–1 | | 2–1 | 1–2 | 1–1 | 0–3 | 1–3 | 3–2 | 1–0 | 2–3 | 2–5 | 1–2 | 5–1 |
| Leeds United | 1–2 | 1–4 | 0–5 | 1–2 | 2–1 | 2–1 | 1–1 | 1–1 | 3–2 | 0–2 | 3–2 | 4–1 | 3–1 | | 1–2 | 0–1 | 2–0 | 3–7 | 4–1 | 1–0 | 0–1 | 0–1 | 0–2 | 1–1 |
| Leicester City | 1–2 | 3–1 | 2–0 | 1–0 | 1–2 | 0–0 | 2–1 | 2–0 | 3–0 | 4–0 | 4–0 | 2–1 | 1–1 | 0–1 | | 2–2 | 0–3 | 0–0 | 1–1 | 1–1 | 0–2 | 3–2 | 2–0 | 1–2 |
| Middlesbrough | 2–0 | 3–1 | 2–2 | 1–0 | 1–1 | 0–2 | 0–2 | 1–1 | 0–0 | 2–0 | 0–0 | 1–0 | 0–0 | 0–2 | 0–0 | | 1–1 | 2–1 | 1–1 | 2–2 | 0–2 | 2–1 | 1–0 | 0–2 |
| Millwall | 0–0 | 0–6 | 2–2 | 1–1 | 1–2 | 0–1 | 0–0 | 3–0 | 0–1 | 0–0 | 3–2 | 2–0 | 4–1 | 0–1 | 2–1 | 1–3 | | 2–0 | 2–2 | 1–0 | 1–2 | 2–3 | 0–2 | 0–0 |
| Nottingham Forest | 0–0 | 1–3 | 0–0 | 1–1 | 0–1 | 0–2 | 0–1 | 2–0 | 0–1 | 1–2 | 1–2 | 0–1 | 3–2 | 0–4 | 2–2 | 2–0 | 3–1 | | 0–1 | 2–0 | 1–0 | 0–3 | 1–1 | 1–4 |
| Peterborough United | 3–4 | 1–1 | 3–1 | 1–2 | 3–0 | 2–1 | 4–3 | 1–0 | 2–1 | 3–2 | 1–2 | 0–1 | 7–1 | 2–3 | 1–0 | 1–1 | 0–3 | 0–1 | | 0–3 | 3–1 | 1–3 | 2–2 | 0–2 |
| Portsmouth | 2–0 | 4–1 | 1–0 | 0–1 | 0–0 | 1–5 | 1–1 | 2–1 | 2–1 | 1–2 | 3–1 | 2–0 | 0–1 | 0–0 | 1–1 | 1–3 | 0–1 | 3–0 | 2–3 | | 1–0 | 1–1 | 2–0 | 0–1 |
| Reading | 1–2 | 1–0 | 3–1 | 3–0 | 1–0 | 1–0 | 1–2 | 2–0 | 2–2 | 2–2 | 2–0 | 0–1 | 1–0 | 2–0 | 3–1 | 0–0 | 2–2 | 1–0 | 3–2 | 1–0 | | 1–1 | 0–2 | 3–0 |
| Southampton | 2–0 | 4–1 | 2–2 | 3–0 | 0–1 | 2–0 | 1–1 | 4–0 | 2–0 | 4–0 | 2–0 | 2–1 | 1–1 | 3–1 | 0–2 | 3–0 | 1–0 | 3–2 | 2–1 | 2–2 | 1–3 | | 4–0 | 1–0 |
| Watford | 2–1 | 2–2 | 0–2 | 1–0 | 2–2 | 3–2 | 1–1 | 0–0 | 0–2 | 0–1 | 4–1 | 1–1 | 2–1 | 1–1 | 3–2 | 2–1 | 2–1 | 0–1 | 3–2 | 2–0 | 1–2 | 0–3 | | 0–4 |
| West Ham United | 1–0 | 3–3 | 4–0 | 6–0 | 0–0 | 1–2 | 0–1 | 1–0 | 0–0 | 3–1 | 1–1 | 2–1 | 0–1 | 2–2 | 3–2 | 1–1 | 2–1 | 2–1 | 1–0 | 4–3 | 2–4 | 1–1 | 1–1 | |

Updated to match(es) played on 28 April 2012. Source: The Football League
Legend: Blue = home team win; Yellow = draw; Red = away team win.

== Statistics ==
As of 30 April 2012

=== Top goalscorers ===
| Rank | Player | Club | Goals |
|---|---|---|---|
| 1 | (England) Rickie Lambert | Southampton | 27 |
| 2 | (Portugal) Ricardo Vaz Tê | Barnsley/West Ham | 22 |
| 3 | (England) Billy Sharp | Doncaster Rovers/Southampton | 19 |
| 4 | (Scotland) Ross McCormack | Leeds United | 18 |
| 5 | (England) Kevin Phillips | Blackpool | 16 |
| 5 | (England) Charlie Austin | Burnley | 16 |
| 5 | (Jamaica) Marlon King | Birmingham City | 16 |
| 5 | (England) Matty Fryatt | Hull City | 16 |
| 9 | (England) Jay Rodriguez | Burnley | 15 |
| 9 | (England) Darius Henderson | Millwall | 15 |
| 9 | (England) David Nugent | Leicester City | 15 |

=== Top assists ===
| Rank | Player | Club | Assists |
|---|---|---|---|
| 1 | (Scotland) Chris Burke | Birmingham City | 16 |
| 2 | (Scotland) Robert Snodgrass | Leeds United | 15 |
| 3 | (England) Rickie Lambert | Southampton | 14 |
| 4 | (England) Peter Whittingham | Cardiff City | 13 |
| 5 | (Jamaica) Jobi McAnuff | Reading | 11 |
| 5 | (Scotland) Danny Fox | Southampton | 11 |
| 5 | (Scotland) Stephen Crainey | Blackpool | 11 |
| 5 | (Republic of Ireland) Liam Lawrence | Portsmouth/Cardiff City | 11 |
| 5 | (Scotland) George Boyd | Peterborough | 11 |
| 10 | (England) Frazer Richardson | Southampton | 10 |
| 10 | (England) Ben Davies | Derby County | 10 |
| 10 | (England) James Henry | Millwall | 10 |
| 10 | (Mali) Jimmy Kébé | Reading | 10 |
| 10 | (England) Adam Lallana | Southampton | 10 |
| 10 | (England) Gary Taylor-Fletcher | Blackpool | 10 |

=== Hat-tricks ===
| Player | For | Against | Result | Date |
|---|---|---|---|---|
| (England) Lee Tomlin | Peterborough United | Ipswich Town | 7–1 | 20 August 2011 |
| (England) Rickie Lambert | Southampton | Nottingham Forest | 3–2 | 10 September 2011 |
| (New Zealand) Chris Wood | Birmingham City | Millwall | 3–0 | 11 September 2011 |
| (England) Darius Henderson | Millwall | Leicester City | 0–3 | 22 October 2011 |
| (England) Jonjo Shelvey | Blackpool | Leeds United | 0–5 | 2 November 2011 |
| (England) Rickie Lambert | Southampton | Brighton & Hove Albion | 3–0 | 19 November 2011 |
| (Scotland) Matt Phillips | Blackpool | Barnsley | 1–3 | 26 December 2011 |
| (Portugal) Ricardo Vaz Tê | Barnsley | Leeds United | 4–1 | 31 December 2011 |
| (England) Darius Henderson | Millwall | Barnsley | 1–3 | 21 January 2012 |
| (Serbia) Nikola Žigić^{4} | Birmingham City | Leeds United | 1–4 | 31 January 2012 |
| (England) Rickie Lambert | Southampton | Watford | 0–3 | 25 February 2012 |
| (England) Rickie Lambert | Southampton | Millwall | 2–3 | 17 March 2012 |
| (Jamaica) Garath McCleary^{4} | Nottingham Forest | Leeds United | 3–7 | 20 March 2012 |
| (England) Charlie Austin | Burnley | Portsmouth | 1–5 | 31 March 2012 |
| (Poland) Radosław Majewski | Nottingham Forest | Crystal Palace | 0–3 | 31 March 2012 |
| (Portugal) Ricardo Vaz Tê | West Ham United | Brighton & Hove Albion | 6–0 | 14 April 2012 |
| (England) Matty Fryatt | Hull City | Barnsley | 3–1 | 17 April 2012 |

- ^{4} Player scored 4 goals

=== Scoring ===
- First goal of the season: Gary Taylor-Fletcher for Blackpool against Hull City (5 August 2011)
- Fastest goal of the season: 7 seconds – Ricardo Vaz Tê for Barnsley against Crystal Palace (6 December 2011)
- Latest goal of the season: 98 minutes and 49 seconds – Luciano Becchio for Leeds United against Doncaster Rovers (18 February 2012)
- Most goals in a game: 10 goals
  - Leeds United 3–7 Nottingham Forest (20 March 2012)
- Most goals scored in a game by one team: 7 goals – Peterborough United 7–1 Ipswich Town (20 August 2011), Leeds United 3–7 Nottingham Forest (20 March 2012).
- Widest winning margin: 6 goals – Peterborough United 7–1 Ipswich Town (20 August 2011), Millwall 0–6 Birmingham City (14 January 2012), West Ham United 6–0 Brighton & Hove Albion (14 April 2012)
- Widest away winning margin: 6 goals – Millwall 0–6 Birmingham City (14 January 2012)
- Highest scoring draw: 6 goals – Brighton & Hove Albion 3–3 Leeds United (23 September 2011), West Ham United 3–3 Birmingham City (9 April 2012)
- Most games failed to score in: 19 – Nottingham Forest
- Fewest games failed to score in: 6 – Birmingham City

=== Disciplinary record by team ===
As of 8 April 2012 (UTC)

| Rank | Team | Yellow card | Red card |
|---|---|---|---|
| 1 | Cardiff City | 49 | 0 |
| 2 | Blackpool | 48 | 1 |
| 3 | Reading | 51 | 1 |
| 4 | Crystal Palace | 49 | 2 |
| = | Peterborough United | 49 | 2 |
| 6 | Southampton | 46 | 4 |
| 7 | Derby County | 54 | 1 |
| 8 | Barnsley | 55 | 2 |
| = | Coventry City | 55 | 2 |
| 10 | Birmingham City | 54 | 3 |
| = | Watford | 56 | 2 |
| 12 | Ipswich Town | 53 | 5 |
| 13 | Nottingham Forest | 57 | 4 |
| = | Burnley | 61 | 2 |
| 15 | Hull City | 64 | 1 |
| 16 | West Ham United | 60 | 6 |
| 17 | Doncaster Rovers | 67 | 3 |
| 18 | Millwall | 70 | 2 |
| 19 | Leicester City | 60 | 9 |
| 20 | Leeds United | 67 | 11 |
| = | Portsmouth | 73 | 4 |
| 22 | Bristol City | 72 | 5 |
| 23 | Middlesbrough | 71 | 7 |
| 24 | Brighton & Hove Albion | 83 | 8 |

- Most yellow cards (player): 12 – Barry Robson (Middlesbrough)
- Most red cards (player): 2 – Neil Danns (Leicester City), Matt Mills (Leicester City), Matt Sparrow (Brighton & Hove Albion), Kevin Thomson (Middlesbrough)

=== Clean sheets ===
- Most clean sheets: 20 – Reading
- Fewest clean sheets: 4 – Peterborough United

== Monthly awards ==
| Month | Manager of the Month | | Player of the Month | | Notes |
| Month | Manager | Club | Player | Club | Notes |
|---|---|---|---|---|---|
| August | (Uruguay) Gus Poyet | Brighton & Hove Albion | (Netherlands) Marvin Emnes | Middlesbrough | |
| September | (England) Tony Mowbray | Middlesbrough | (England) Matthew Bates | Middlesbrough | |
| October | (Republic of Ireland) Chris Hughton | Birmingham City | (England) Nathaniel Clyne | Crystal Palace | |
| November | (Scotland) Malky Mackay | Cardiff City | (England) Billy Sharp | Doncaster Rovers | |
| December | (England) Tony Mowbray | Middlesbrough | (Republic of Ireland) Alex Pearce | Reading | |
| January | (Republic of Ireland) Chris Hughton | Birmingham City | (Sierra Leone) Curtis Davies | Birmingham City | |
| February | (England) Brian McDermott | Reading | (Australia) Adam Federici | Reading | |
| March | (England) Brian McDermott | Reading | (Jamaica) Garath McCleary | Nottingham Forest | |
| April | (Wales) Kenny Jackett | Millwall | (Portugal) Ricardo Vaz Tê | West Ham United | |

== Events ==
=== Portsmouth administration ===
On 17 February 2012, Portsmouth entered administration for the second time in three years, incurring a 10-point penalty. Trevor Birch of the accountancy firm Pannell Kerr Forster was appointed administrator of the club.

== Attendances ==
| No. | Club | Average | Change | Highest | Lowest |
|---|---|---|---|---|---|
| 1 | West Ham United | 30,923 | -7.7% | 35,000 | 25,680 |
| 2 | Southampton | 26,420 | 19.2% | 32,363 | 21,014 |
| 3 | Derby County | 26,020 | 0.0% | 33,010 | 22,040 |
| 4 | Leeds United | 23,283 | -14.7% | 33,366 | 19,469 |
| 5 | Leicester City | 23,037 | -2.7% | 27,720 | 19,806 |
| 6 | Cardiff City | 22,100 | -4.7% | 25,109 | 20,366 |
| 7 | Nottingham Forest | 21,970 | -5.6% | 27,356 | 18,506 |
| 8 | Brighton & Hove Albion | 20,028 | 172.4% | 20,968 | 18,412 |
| 9 | Reading | 19,219 | 8.7% | 24,026 | 15,124 |
| 10 | Birmingham City | 19,127 | -24.9% | 25,516 | 16,253 |
| 11 | Hull City | 18,790 | -11.2% | 22,676 | 16,604 |
| 12 | Ipswich Town | 18,267 | -6.9% | 24,763 | 15,650 |
| 13 | Middlesbrough | 17,558 | 7.9% | 27,794 | 14,366 |
| 14 | Crystal Palace | 15,219 | -0.9% | 21,002 | 11,853 |
| 15 | Coventry City | 15,119 | -7.3% | 22,240 | 12,054 |
| 16 | Portsmouth | 15,016 | -4.4% | 19,879 | 11,261 |
| 17 | Burnley | 14,048 | -5.9% | 17,226 | 12,355 |
| 18 | Bristol City | 13,846 | -5.2% | 19,003 | 12,017 |
| 19 | Blackpool | 12,764 | -19.1% | 14,141 | 11,414 |
| 20 | Watford | 12,704 | -3.4% | 16,314 | 10,592 |
| 21 | Millwall | 11,484 | -7.7% | 16,085 | 9,062 |
| 22 | Barnsley | 10,332 | -12.9% | 17,499 | 8,900 |
| 23 | Doncaster Rovers | 9,341 | -8.9% | 12,962 | 7,572 |
| 24 | Peterborough United | 9,111 | 41.3% | 13,517 | 6,351 |
