= Deepak Chainrai =

Businessman

Deepak Chainrai is a Hong Kong–based businessman. He partly owns English Championship club Portsmouth F.C.

Chainrai is brother to fellow Portsmouth F.C. part owner Balram Chainrai.

== Portsmouth FC ==
Having finally exited administration on 23 October 2010, Portsmouth F.C. confirmed the sale of the club back to Deepak's brother; Belram. Along with Levi Kushnir and Deepak Chainrai, Balram Chainrai has expressed a wish to stabilize the club, guaranteeing its future, whilst looking to loan substantial sums to the club at exorbitant rates of interest.
