= Gordon Shepherd (football chairman) =

English football chairman

Gordon Shepherd (born 21 December 1935) is the former chairman of Barnsley F.C. He was chairman since 2004 after Peter Ridsdale resigned. He retired at the end of the 2007–08 season.

Business positions
Preceded by Peter Ridsdale	Barnsley F.C. chairman 2004 – 2008	Vacant
