= Ali al-Faraj =

Ali Abdullah Al Faraj
- Born: 1969 (age 56–57); Riyadh
- Other name: Ali Al-Faraj
- Known for: Ex Portsmouth F.C. owner

Ali al-Faraj is a Saudi businessman, and formerly the majority stakeholder in Portsmouth Football Club.

== Portsmouth FC ==
Ali al-Faraj was allegedly introduced to Portsmouth via their then CEO Peter Storrie, through Israeli agent Pini Zahavi when the club was on the brink of financial meltdown. Faraj developed a consortium with other investors and Storrie and bid for the club. Former owner Alexandre Gaydamak dismissed the Saudi's bid and instead sold to Dubai businessman Sulaiman Al-Fahim. Just over 40 days later, al-Faraj purchased a 90% stake in Portsmouth on 5 October 2009 through Falcondrone Ltd from Al-Fahim, who had underestimated the capital required to sustain the business, and faced difficulty attracting inward investment while former owner Alexandre Gaydamak faced accusations of having transferred club assets to family companies at reduced fees, adding to the financial difficulties faced.

At the start of February 2010, it became public that al-Faraj had financed the purchase of the club by means of a £17 million bridging loan from Balram Chainrai's company Portpin Ltd. Within weeks, al-Faraj 'defaulted' on his payments, causing Chainrai to assume possession Falcondrone, and thus the football club.

Weeks later, Chainrai placed Portsmouth into administration.

In October 2010, after High Court battles to agree on a CVA and a last-minute public display of brinkmanship between the club's administrator and former owners, Balram Chainrai purchased the football club from its receivers to bring the club out of administration.

== Controversy ==
It is believed that Al-Faraj does not exist and is actually a pseudonym for Balram Chainrai. Whilst Chainrai has been vocal in his denial of the assertion, he has not been as forthcoming about his previous dealings with Gaydamak. Chainrai successfully sued Gaydamak for damages around the time Al Faraj purchased Portsmouth Football Club. It is currently unclear whether the damages awarded to Chainrai had been paid. Fans therefore speculate that Chainrai's arrival at Portsmouth was intended to seize the club and liquidate its assets by way of remuneration for the court order, with the Gaydamak family consequently extracting as much value from the club as was possible before the club's account was frozen.

== Profile ==
With a holding in petrochemical giant SABIC, Faraj also has business interests in Saudi Uniform Manufacture, AKETIPS'S and Easyway Limited, which owns property in both Saudi Arabia and the UK

== Personal ==
Ali is reported to have seven brothers and two sisters, including Ahmed al-Faraj, who also claims a stake in SABIC. 'He' is also married and has two daughters and one son.
