= 2010–11 Premier League =

Football season in England

Premier League
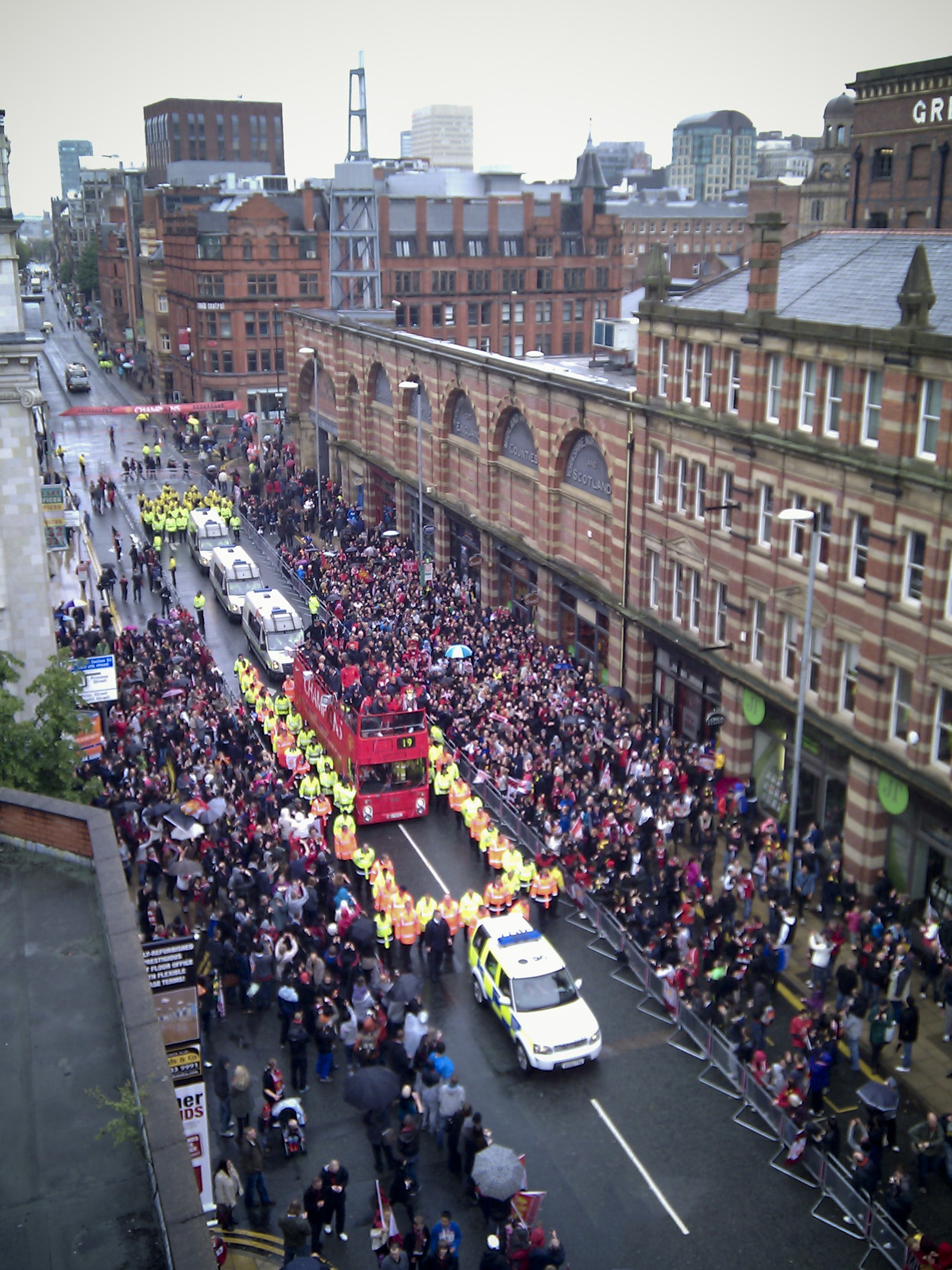
- Season: 2010–11
- Dates: 14 August 2010 – 22 May 2011
- Champions: Manchester United; 12th Premier League title 19th English title
- Relegated: Birmingham City; Blackpool; West Ham United
- Champions League: Manchester United; Chelsea; Manchester City; Arsenal
- Europa League: Tottenham Hotspur; Birmingham City; Stoke City; Fulham (through UEFA Respect Fair Play ranking)
- Matches: 380
- Goals: 1,063 (2.8 per match)
- Top goalscorer: Dimitar Berbatov; Carlos Tevez (20 goals each)
- Best goalkeeper: Joe Hart (18 clean sheets)
- Biggest home win: Chelsea 6–0 West Bromwich Albion (14 August 2010); Arsenal 6–0 Blackpool (21 August 2010); Newcastle United 6–0 Aston Villa (22 August 2010); Manchester United 7–1 Blackburn Rovers (27 November 2010)
- Biggest away win: Wigan Athletic 0–6 Chelsea (21 August 2010)
- Highest scoring: Manchester United 7–1 Blackburn Rovers (27 November 2010); Everton 5–3 Blackpool (5 February 2011); Newcastle United 4–4 Arsenal (5 February 2011)
- Longest winning run: 5 games Chelsea
- Longest unbeaten run: 24 games Manchester United
- Longest winless run: 10 games Blackburn Rovers
- Longest losing run: 5 games Blackpool; Bolton Wanderers; West Bromwich Albion; West Ham United
- Highest attendance: 75,486; Manchester United 1–0 Bolton Wanderers (19 March 2011)
- Lowest attendance: 14,042; Wigan Athletic 2–0; Wolverhampton Wanderers (2 October 2010)
- Total attendance: 13,372,318
- Average attendance: 35,190

The 2010–11 Premier League (known as the Barclays Premier League for sponsorship reasons) was the 19th season of the Premier League since its establishment in 1992 The 2010–11 fixtures were released on 17 June 2010 at 09:00 BST. The season began on 14 August 2010, and ended on 22 May 2011. Chelsea were the defending champions.

Manchester United secured the title with a 1–1 draw away to Blackburn Rovers on 14 May 2011. This was their nineteenth English league title, breaking a tie with Liverpool which had stood since Manchester United won their eighteenth title in 2009. Manchester United, Chelsea, Manchester City and Arsenal all secured a berth for the 2011–12 UEFA Champions League, while Tottenham Hotspur qualified for the 2011–12 UEFA Europa League via league position.

An independent commission later found that Manchester City breached Premier League financial rules during this season, part of a pattern of breaches spanning 2009-2018.

== Relegation ==
On 15 May 2011, West Ham United were the first team to be relegated to the Championship, following a 3–2 defeat away to Wigan Athletic. Two more relegation spots were to be confirmed going into the final day of the season, with five teams (Blackburn Rovers, Wolverhampton Wanderers, Birmingham City, Blackpool, and Wigan Athletic) all at threat of the drop. Blackburn secured their top flight status with a 3–2 away win over Wolves. Blackpool were relegated after losing 4–2 to champions Manchester United at Old Trafford, despite having led at one point. Birmingham City were also down after Roman Pavlyuchenko scored an injury-time winner for Tottenham at White Hart Lane. Both of these results allowed Wolves to avoid the drop by one point, despite their loss to Blackburn, while Wigan, who were in the bottom three prior to kick-off, extended their Premier League stay to seven consecutive seasons after a 1–0 win away at Stoke City.

== Rule changes ==
The Premier League introduced a cap on the number of players in a squad. From this season onwards, clubs had to declare a squad of no more than 25 players when the summer transfer window shuts, and then again at the end of the January transfer window. Players aged 21 and under could be selected without being registered in the 25.

Also being introduced this season was the "home grown players" rule, which aims to encourage the development of young footballers at Premier League clubs. The new rule required clubs to name at least eight players in their squad of 25 players that have been registered domestically for a minimum of three seasons prior to their 21st birthday.

All of the Premier League teams submitted their 25-man squads on 1 September 2010 deadline.

== Teams ==
Twenty teams competed in the league – the top seventeen teams from the previous season and the three teams promoted from the Championship. The promoted teams were Newcastle United, West Bromwich Albion (both teams returning after a season's absence), and Blackpool (returning after a thirty-nine-year absence). This was also Blackpool's first season in the Premier League. They replaced Burnley, Hull City and Portsmouth, who were relegated to the Championship after their top flight spells of one, two and seven years respectively.

=== Stadiums and locations ===
Locations of the 2010–11 Premier League teams
Greater London Premier League football clubs
Greater Manchester Premier League football clubs
West Midlands Premier League football clubs

Note: Table lists in alphabetical order.

Team	Location	Stadium	Capacity^{1}
Arsenal	London (Holloway)	Emirates Stadium	60,361
Aston Villa	Birmingham (Aston)	Villa Park	42,789
Birmingham City	Birmingham (Bordesley)	St Andrew's	30,079
Blackburn Rovers	Blackburn	Ewood Park	31,367
Blackpool	Blackpool	Bloomfield Road	16,220
Bolton Wanderers	Bolton	Reebok Stadium	28,723
Chelsea	London (Fulham)	Stamford Bridge	42,449
Everton	Liverpool (Walton)	Goodison Park	40,157
Fulham	London (Fulham)	Craven Cottage	25,700
Liverpool	Liverpool (Anfield)	Anfield	45,276
Manchester City	Manchester (Bradford)	City of Manchester Stadium	47,405
Manchester United	Manchester (Old Trafford)	Old Trafford	75,797
Newcastle United	Newcastle upon Tyne	St James' Park	52,409
Stoke City	Stoke-on-Trent	Britannia Stadium	27,740
Sunderland	Sunderland	Stadium of Light	49,000
Tottenham Hotspur	London (Tottenham)	White Hart Lane	36,230
West Bromwich Albion	West Bromwich	The Hawthorns	26,484
West Ham United	London (Upton Park)	Boleyn Ground	35,303
Wigan Athletic	Wigan	DW Stadium	25,133
Wolverhampton Wanderers	Wolverhampton	Molineux Stadium	29,195

- ^{1} Correct as of start of 2010–11 Premier League season

=== Personnel and kits ===
Note: Flags indicate national team as has been defined under FIFA eligibility rules. Players and Managers may hold more than one non-FIFA nationality.

Team	Manager	Captain	Kit manufacturer	Shirt sponsor
Arsenal	(France) Arsène Wenger	(Spain) Cesc Fàbregas	Nike	Emirates
Aston Villa	(France) Gérard Houllier	(Bulgaria) Stiliyan Petrov	Nike	FxPro
Birmingham City	(Scotland) Alex McLeish	(Republic of Ireland) Stephen Carr	Xtep	F&C Investments
Blackburn Rovers	(Scotland) Steve Kean	(Republic of the Congo) Christopher Samba	Umbro	Crown Paints
Blackpool	(England) Ian Holloway	(Scotland) Charlie Adam	Carbrini	Wonga.com
Bolton Wanderers	(Republic of Ireland) Owen Coyle	(England) Kevin Davies	Reebok	188BET
Chelsea	(Italy) Carlo Ancelotti	(England) John Terry	Adidas	Samsung
Everton	(Scotland) David Moyes	(England) Phil Neville	Le Coq Sportif	Chang Beer
Fulham	(Wales) Mark Hughes	(England) Danny Murphy	Kappa	FxPro
Liverpool	(Scotland) Kenny Dalglish	(England) Steven Gerrard	Adidas	Standard Chartered
Manchester City	(Italy) Roberto Mancini	(Argentina) Carlos Tevez	Umbro	Etihad Airways
Manchester United	(Scotland) Sir Alex Ferguson	(England) Gary Neville	Nike	Aon
Newcastle United	(England) Alan Pardew	(England) Kevin Nolan	Puma	Northern Rock
Stoke City	(Wales) Tony Pulis	(England) Ryan Shawcross	Adidas	Britannia
Sunderland	(England) Steve Bruce	(England) Lee Cattermole	Umbro	Tombola
Tottenham Hotspur	(England) Harry Redknapp	(England) Michael Dawson	Puma	Autonomy
West Bromwich Albion	(England) Roy Hodgson	(Northern Ireland) Chris Brunt	Umbro	Homeserve
West Ham United	(England) Kevin Keen (caretaker)	(England) Matthew Upson	Macron	SBOBET
Wigan Athletic	(Spain) Roberto Martínez	(Scotland) Gary Caldwell	MiFit	188BET
Wolverhampton Wanderers	(Republic of Ireland) Mick McCarthy	(England) Karl Henry	BURRDA	Sportingbet

Nike produced a new match ball, the Nike Total 90 Tracer, which was electric blue, black and white during the autumn and spring. A high-visibility version in yellow was released for the winter. Additionally, Umbro provided officials with new kits in black, lime green, yellow, red and cyan blue for the season. Tune Ventures, parent company of AirAsia, took over as sponsor of the referee kits for the next three seasons.

=== Managerial changes ===
Team	Outgoing manager	Manner of departure	Date of vacancy	Table	Incoming manager	Date of appointment
West Ham United	(Italy) Gianfranco Zola	Sacked	11 May 2010	Pre-season	(Israel) Avram Grant	3 June 2010
Liverpool	(Spain) Rafael Benítez	Mutual agreement	3 June 2010	Pre-season	(England) Roy Hodgson	1 July 2010
Fulham	(England) Roy Hodgson	Signed by Liverpool	1 July 2010	Pre-season	(Wales) Mark Hughes	29 July 2010
Aston Villa	(Northern Ireland) Martin O'Neill	Resigned	9 August 2010	Pre-season	(France) Gérard Houllier	8 September 2010
Newcastle United	(Republic of Ireland) Chris Hughton	Sacked	6 December 2010	11th	(England) Alan Pardew	9 December 2010
Blackburn Rovers	(England) Sam Allardyce	Sacked	13 December 2010	13th	(Scotland) Steve Kean	22 December 2010
Liverpool	(England) Roy Hodgson	Mutual consent	8 January 2011	12th	(Scotland) Kenny Dalglish	8 January 2011
West Bromwich Albion	(Italy) Roberto Di Matteo	Sacked	6 February 2011	16th	(England) Roy Hodgson	11 February 2011
West Ham United	(Israel) Avram Grant	Sacked	15 May 2011	20th (relegated)	(England) Kevin Keen (caretaker)	15 May 2011

== League table ==
Pos	Team	Pld	W	D	L	GF	GA	GD	Pts	Qualification or relegation
1	Manchester United (C)	38	23	11	4	78	37	+41	80	Qualification for the Champions League group stage
2	Chelsea	38	21	8	9	69	33	+36	71	Qualification for the Champions League group stage
3	Manchester City	38	21	8	9	60	33	+27	71	Qualification for the Champions League group stage
4	Arsenal	38	19	11	8	72	43	+29	68	Qualification for the Champions League play-off round
5	Tottenham Hotspur	38	16	14	8	55	46	+9	62	Qualification for the Europa League play-off round
6	Liverpool	38	17	7	14	59	44	+15	58	
7	Everton	38	13	15	10	51	45	+6	54	
8	Fulham	38	11	16	11	49	43	+6	49	Qualification for the Europa League first qualifying round (Note: Fulham, as the highest-ranked team from the Fair Play table not yet qualified for any European competition, entered the first qualifying round of the Europa League.)
9	Aston Villa	38	12	12	14	48	59	−11	48	
10	Sunderland	38	12	11	15	45	56	−11	47	
11	West Bromwich Albion	38	12	11	15	56	71	−15	47	
12	Newcastle United	38	11	13	14	56	57	−1	46	
13	Stoke City	38	13	7	18	46	48	−2	46	Qualification for the Europa League third qualifying round (Note: Stoke City qualified for the third qualifying round of the Europa League as FA Cup runners-up to Champions League-qualified Manchester City.)
14	Bolton Wanderers	38	12	10	16	52	56	−4	46	
15	Blackburn Rovers	38	11	10	17	46	59	−13	43	
16	Wigan Athletic	38	9	15	14	40	61	−21	42	
17	Wolverhampton Wanderers	38	11	7	20	46	66	−20	40	
18	Birmingham City (R)	38	8	15	15	37	58	−21	39	Qualification for the Europa League play-off round and relegation to Football League Championship (Note: Birmingham City qualified for the play-off round of the Europa League after winning the League Cup, worth a third qualification round spot, and subsequently being moved up a round due to the outcome of the FA Cup final.)
19	Blackpool (R)	38	10	9	19	55	78	−23	39	Relegation to Football League Championship
20	West Ham United (R)	38	7	12	19	43	70	−27	33	Relegation to Football League Championship

Source: Barclays Premier League
Rules for classification: 1) points; 2) goal difference; 3) number of goals scored.
(C) Champions; (R) Relegated

== Results ==
Home \ Away	ARS	AVL	BIR	BLB	BLP	BOL	CHE	EVE	FUL	LIV	MCI	MUN	NEW	STK	SUN	TOT	WBA	WHU	WIG	WOL
Arsenal	—	1–2	2–1	0–0	6–0	4–1	3–1	2–1	2–1	1–1	0–0	1–0	0–1	1–0	0–0	2–3	2–3	1–0	3–0	2–0
Aston Villa	2–4	—	0–0	4–1	3–2	1–1	0–0	1–0	2–2	1–0	1–0	2–2	1–0	1–1	0–1	1–2	2–1	3–0	1–1	0–1
Birmingham City	0–3	1–1	—	2–1	2–0	2–1	1–0	0–2	0–2	0–0	2–2	1–1	0–2	1–0	2–0	1–1	1–3	2–2	0–0	1–1
Blackburn Rovers	1–2	2–0	1–1	—	2–2	1–0	1–2	1–0	1–1	3–1	0–1	1–1	0–0	0–2	0–0	0–1	2–0	1–1	2–1	3–0
Blackpool	1–3	1–1	1–2	1–2	—	4–3	1–3	2–2	2–2	2–1	2–3	2–3	1–1	0–0	1–2	3–1	2–1	1–3	1–3	2–1
Bolton Wanderers	2–1	3–2	2–2	2–1	2–2	—	0–4	2–0	0–0	0–1	0–2	2–2	5–1	2–1	1–2	4–2	2–0	3–0	1–1	1–0
Chelsea	2–0	3–3	3–1	2–0	4–0	1–0	—	1–1	1–0	0–1	2–0	2–1	2–2	2–0	0–3	2–1	6–0	3–0	1–0	2–0
Everton	1–2	2–2	1–1	2–0	5–3	1–1	1–0	—	2–1	2–0	2–1	3–3	0–1	1–0	2–0	2–1	1–4	2–2	0–0	1–1
Fulham	2–2	1–1	1–1	3–2	3–0	3–0	0–0	0–0	—	2–5	1–4	2–2	1–0	2–0	0–0	1–2	3–0	1–3	2–0	2–1
Liverpool	1–1	3–0	5–0	2–1	1–2	2–1	2–0	2–2	1–0	—	3–0	3–1	3–0	2–0	2–2	0–2	1–0	3–0	1–1	0–1
Manchester City	0–3	4–0	0–0	1–1	1–0	1–0	1–0	1–2	1–1	3–0	—	0–0	2–1	3–0	5–0	1–0	3–0	2–1	1–0	4–3
Manchester United	1–0	3–1	5–0	7–1	4–2	1–0	2–1	1–0	2–0	3–2	2–1	—	3–0	2–1	2–0	2–0	2–2	3–0	2–0	2–1
Newcastle United	4–4	6–0	2–1	1–2	0–2	1–1	1–1	1–2	0–0	3–1	1–3	0–0	—	1–2	5–1	1–1	3–3	5–0	2–2	4–1
Stoke City	3–1	2–1	3–2	1–0	0–1	2–0	1–1	2–0	0–2	2–0	1–1	1–2	4–0	—	3–2	1–2	1–1	1–1	0–1	3–0
Sunderland	1–1	1–0	2–2	3–0	0–2	1–0	2–4	2–2	0–3	0–2	1–0	0–0	1–1	2–0	—	1–2	2–3	1–0	4–2	1–3
Tottenham Hotspur	3–3	2–1	2–1	4–2	1–1	2–1	1–1	1–1	1–0	2–1	0–0	0–0	2–0	3–2	1–1	—	2–2	0–0	0–1	3–1
West Bromwich Albion	2–2	2–1	3–1	1–3	3–2	1–1	1–3	1–0	2–1	2–1	0–2	1–2	3–1	0–3	1–0	1–1	—	3–3	2–2	1–1
West Ham United	0–3	1–2	0–1	1–1	0–0	1–3	1–3	1–1	1–1	3–1	1–3	2–4	1–2	3–0	0–3	1–0	2–2	—	3–1	2–0
Wigan Athletic	2–2	1–2	2–1	4–3	0–4	1–1	0–6	1–1	1–1	1–1	0–2	0–4	0–1	2–2	1–1	0–0	1–0	3–2	—	2–0
Wolverhampton Wanderers	0–2	1–2	1–0	2–3	4–0	2–3	1–0	0–3	1–1	0–3	2–1	2–1	1–1	2–1	3–2	3–3	3–1	1–1	1–2	—

Source: Barclays Premier League
Legend: Blue = home team win; Yellow = draw; Red = away team win.

== Season statistics ==
=== Scoring ===
- First goal of the season: Stewart Downing for Aston Villa against West Ham United (14 August 2010)
- Fastest goal of the season: 30 seconds – Maxi Rodríguez for Liverpool against Fulham (9 May 2011)
- Widest winning margin: 6 goals
  - Chelsea 6–0 West Bromwich Albion (14 August 2010)
  - Arsenal 6–0 Blackpool (21 August 2010)
  - Wigan Athletic 0–6 Chelsea (21 August 2010)
  - Newcastle United 6–0 Aston Villa (22 August 2010)
  - Manchester United 7–1 Blackburn Rovers (27 November 2010)
- Highest scoring game: 8 goals
  - Manchester United 7–1 Blackburn Rovers (27 November 2010)
  - Everton 5–3 Blackpool (5 February 2011)
  - Newcastle United 4–4 Arsenal (5 February 2011)
- Most goals scored in a match by a single team: 7 goals – Manchester United 7–1 Blackburn Rovers (27 November 2010)
- Fewest games failed to score in: 5 – Manchester United
- Most games failed to score in: 13
  - Stoke City
  - West Ham United
  - Wigan Athletic

==== Top scorers ====
Rank	Player	Club	Goals
1	(Bulgaria) Dimitar Berbatov	Manchester United	20
1	(Argentina) Carlos Tevez	Manchester City	20
3	(Netherlands) Robin van Persie	Arsenal	18
4	(England) Darren Bent	Sunderland/Aston Villa	17
5	(Nigeria) Peter Odemwingie	West Bromwich Albion	15
6	(England) DJ Campbell	Blackpool	13
6	(England) Andy Carroll	Newcastle/Liverpool	13
6	(Mexico) Javier Hernández	Manchester United	13
6	(Netherlands) Dirk Kuyt	Liverpool	13
6	(France) Florent Malouda	Chelsea	13
6	(Netherlands) Rafael van der Vaart	Tottenham Hotspur	13

==== Hat-tricks ====
Player	For	Against	Result	Date
(Ivory Coast) Didier Drogba	Chelsea	West Bromwich Albion	6–0	14 August 2010
(England) Theo Walcott	Arsenal	Blackpool	6–0	21 August 2010
(England) Andy Carroll	Newcastle United	Aston Villa	6–0	22 August 2010
(Bulgaria) Dimitar Berbatov	Manchester United	Liverpool	3–2	19 September 2010
(England) Kevin Nolan	Newcastle United	Sunderland	5–1	31 October 2010
(Bulgaria) Dimitar Berbatov^{5}	Manchester United	Blackburn Rovers	7–1	27 November 2010
(Italy) Mario Balotelli	Manchester City	Aston Villa	4–0	28 December 2010
(Republic of Ireland) Leon Best	Newcastle United	West Ham United	5–0	5 January 2011
(Bulgaria) Dimitar Berbatov	Manchester United	Birmingham City	5–0	22 January 2011
(Netherlands) Robin van Persie	Arsenal	Wigan Athletic	3–0	22 January 2011
(Argentina) Carlos Tevez	Manchester City	West Bromwich Albion	3–0	5 February 2011
(France) Louis Saha^{4}	Everton	Blackpool	5–3	5 February 2011
(Netherlands) Dirk Kuyt	Liverpool	Manchester United	3–1	6 March 2011
(England) Wayne Rooney	Manchester United	West Ham United	4–2	2 April 2011
(Argentina) Maxi Rodríguez	Liverpool	Birmingham City	5–0	23 April 2011
(Argentina) Maxi Rodríguez	Liverpool	Fulham	5–2	9 May 2011
(Cameroon) Somen Tchoyi	West Bromwich Albion	Newcastle United	3–3	22 May 2011

- ^{4} Player scored four goals
- ^{5} Player scored five goals

=== Clean sheets ===
==== Player ====
Rank	Player	Club	Clean sheets
1	(England) Joe Hart	Manchester City	18
2	(Czech Republic) Petr Čech	Chelsea	15
3	(Spain) Pepe Reina	Liverpool	14
3	(Netherlands) Edwin van der Sar	Manchester United	14
5	(Australia) Mark Schwarzer	Fulham	11
6	(England) Ben Foster	Birmingham City	9
6	(United States) Tim Howard	Everton	9
8	(Bosnia and Herzegovina) Asmir Begovic	Stoke City	8
8	(Belgium) Simon Mignolet	Sunderland	8
8	(England) Paul Robinson	Blackburn Rovers	8

==== Club ====
- Most clean sheets: 18 – Manchester City
- Fewest clean sheets: 2 – West Bromwich Albion

=== Discipline ===
==== Club ====
- Worst overall disciplinary record (1 point per yellow card, 3 points per red card):
  - Manchester City – 89 points (74 yellow & 5 red cards)
- Best overall disciplinary record:
  - Blackpool – 53 points (47 yellow & 2 red cards)
- Most yellow cards: 75 – Newcastle United
- Most red cards: 7 – West Bromwich Albion

==== Player ====
- Most yellow cards: 14 – Cheick Tioté (Newcastle United)
- Most red cards: 2
  - Lee Cattermole (Sunderland)
  - Craig Gardner (Birmingham City)
  - Laurent Koscielny (Arsenal)
  - Youssouf Mulumbu (West Bromwich Albion)
  - Ryan Shawcross (Stoke City)
- Most fouls: 115 – Kevin Davies (Bolton Wanderers)

== Awards ==
=== Monthly awards ===
Month	Manager of the Month		Player of the Month		Reference
Month	Manager	Club	Player	Club	Reference
August	(Italy) Carlo Ancelotti	Chelsea	(England) Paul Scholes	Manchester United	
September	(Italy) Roberto Di Matteo	West Bromwich Albion	(Nigeria) Peter Odemwingie	West Bromwich Albion	
October	(Scotland) David Moyes	Everton	(Netherlands) Rafael van der Vaart	Tottenham Hotspur	
November	(Scotland) Owen Coyle	Bolton Wanderers	(Sweden) Johan Elmander	Bolton Wanderers	
December	(Italy) Roberto Mancini	Manchester City	(France) Samir Nasri	Arsenal	
January	(Scotland) Sir Alex Ferguson	Manchester United	(Bulgaria) Dimitar Berbatov	Manchester United	
February	(France) Arsène Wenger	Arsenal	(England) Scott Parker	West Ham United	
March	(Italy) Carlo Ancelotti	Chelsea	(Brazil) David Luiz	Chelsea	
April	(Italy) Carlo Ancelotti	Chelsea	(Nigeria) Peter Odemwingie	West Bromwich Albion	

=== Annual awards ===
Award	Winner	Club
Premier League Manager of the Season	(Scotland) Sir Alex Ferguson	Manchester United
Premier League Player of the Season	(Serbia) Nemanja Vidić	Manchester United
PFA Players' Player of the Year	(Wales) Gareth Bale	Tottenham Hotspur
PFA Young Player of the Year	(England) Jack Wilshere	Arsenal
FWA Footballer of the Year	(England) Scott Parker	West Ham United
PFA Fans' Player of the Year	(Portugal) Raul Meireles	Liverpool

PFA Team of the Year
Goalkeeper	(Netherlands) Edwin van der Sar (Manchester United)			
Defence	(England) Ashley Cole (Chelsea)	(Belgium) Vincent Kompany (Manchester City)	(Serbia) Nemanja Vidić (Manchester United)	(France) Bacary Sagna (Arsenal)
Midfield	(Portugal) Nani (Manchester United)	(France) Samir Nasri (Arsenal)	(England) Jack Wilshere (Arsenal)	(Wales) Gareth Bale (Tottenham Hotspur)
Attack	(Argentina) Carlos Tevez (Manchester City)		(Bulgaria) Dimitar Berbatov (Manchester United)	

== Attendances ==
#	Football club	Home games	Average attendance
1	Manchester United	19	75,109
2	Arsenal FC	19	60,025
3	Newcastle United	19	47,718
4	Manchester City	19	45,905
5	Liverpool FC	19	42,820
6	Chelsea FC	19	41,435
7	Sunderland AFC	19	40,011
8	Aston Villa	19	37,194
9	Everton FC	19	35,934
10	Tottenham Hotspur	19	35,704
11	West Ham United	19	33,404
12	Wolverhampton Wanderers	19	27,696
13	Stoke City	19	26,858
14	Birmingham City	19	25,462
15	Fulham FC	19	25,043
16	Blackburn Rovers	19	25,000
17	West Bromwich Albion	19	24,683
18	Bolton Wanderers	19	22,870
19	Wigan Athletic	19	16,812
20	Blackpool FC	19	15,780
