= Peter Ridsdale =

English businessman

- Born: 11 March 1952 (age 74); Leeds, England
- Education: Leeds Modern School, Lawnswood, Leeds
- Occupation: Businessman

Peter Ridsdale (born 11 March 1952) is an English businessman who is a director at Preston North End. He was until December 2011 the Chairman of Football Operations at Plymouth Argyle. Ridsdale was previously the chairman of Leeds United, Barnsley and Cardiff City.

== History ==
=== Leeds United ===
Ridsdale became chairman of hometown club Leeds United in 1997 and enjoyed success in the first four years of tenure as Leeds reached the UEFA Cup semi-final in 1999–2000 and the UEFA Champions League semi-finals in 2000–01. During this time he enjoyed a good relationship with the Leeds fans. However, once the full extent of what Ridsdale and his board had done at the club was discovered, his once positive relationship with fans disintegrated. Ridsdale is now deeply unpopular amongst Leeds supporters for his role in the financial and relegation downward spiral of the club, falling from competing in the UEFA Champions League to EFL League One in six seasons.

Under Ridsdale's stewardship the club borrowed £60m against future gate receipts, effectively gambling on Leeds qualifying for the Champions League in successive seasons, which they failed to do. Ridsdale has repeatedly denied any blame with regard to the later situation of the club but has also conflictingly admitted it was a mistake to allow David O'Leary to spend so lavishly on players. Ridsdale also claimed that he would have saved Leeds from subsequent relegations to the third tier of English football and the debt his board had incurred in the name of the club. The fact remained however that by the time Ridsdale stepped down in March 2003, Leeds were £103 million in debt and failing on the field.

After Leeds' relegation to the third tier of the English league system for the first time in their history Ridsdale said he was "deeply saddened" by Leeds's relegation but stated that he did not believe that events during his tenure as Leeds chairman were in any way responsible for the club's current plight.

=== Barnsley ===
He was also the owner of Barnsley for a while, rescuing them from folding after dropping from the Premier League to Division Two and loss of revenue from the ITV Digital collapse. Some saw him as a major mistake at Barnsley as he nearly made the club go into liquidation before Gordon Shepherd and Patrick Cryne took over at Oakwell.

=== Cardiff City ===
He became deputy Chairman of Cardiff City, who had recruited him to help with their new stadium project, which eventually became Cardiff City Stadium. He became chairman in October 2006 after Sam Hammam stepped down. The club's debts were estimated at £35m, and losing £10m each year, according to Ridsdale.

In mid-2007, Ridsdale campaigned to become a member of the Football Association of Wales council and hoped to be elected as one of six south Wales representatives on Welsh football's ruling body. However, when the vote took place in July he finished bottom of the candidates with just fourteen votes. It has been alleged that the former Leeds chairman has flirted with disaster, trying to build a promotion-winning side while, at the same time, the Bluebirds have fought off four winding-up orders. Ridsdale was forced to apologise for "misleading" fans when he conceded money raised during Christmas period 2009 from season ticket renewals for 2011 had to be spent on settling debts rather than reinforcements.

He announced his intention to quit as Cardiff chairman at the end of May 2010, the play-off final loss to Blackpool at Wembley Stadium on 22 May 2010 being his final game. Malaysian Consortium head Dato Chan Tien Ghee took over as part of a £6m deal for an estimated 30% of the club.

=== Plymouth Argyle ===
Ridsdale approached Plymouth Argyle with the intentions of investing in the club, but with a winding-up petition in place Ridsdale was instead appointed as a footballing advisor to the board in December 2010, with an aim of selling "short-term assets", i.e. the playing staff. Craig Noone and Réda Johnson were subsequently sold, and the club survived the winding-up attempt for debts owed to HM Revenue & Customs.

In March 2011, the club were still in financial peril and with staff still unpaid and debts rising as the months passed, Ridsdale proposed that the club needed £5million in investment to complete the football season. The club announced plans to be placed into administration, and were docked 10 points. Brendan Guilfoyle (a Leeds-based insolvency practitioner) was appointed as administrator and retained Ridsdale to run the footballing side of the business. The club were relegated from League One at the end of the season.

In the summer of 2011 Ridsdale continued to act as chairman, assisting Guilfoyle in finding potential buyers, before buying the club himself for the nominal fee of £1 with the intentions of keeping the club afloat until a more permanent owner could be found. Ridsdale fired Peter Reid as manager just one month into the season, replacing him with Carl Fletcher as a caretaker player-manager.

With club staff nearing their tenth month without pay, James Brent arranged deals with the PFA and Plymouth City Council to help clear debts, and took over the club from Ridsdale and the administrators in October 2011.

=== Preston North End ===
Peter Ridsdale became the Preston North End chairman on 6 December 2011. Within eight days of his appointment, Peter Ridsdale sacked the then Preston manager Phil Brown after only one win in eleven. He then left this role and became an advisor to the owner, Mr T Hemmings in 2012. Ridsdale was appointed to the board at Preston North End on 5 July 2021.

== United We Fall ==
In November 2007 Ridsdale released the book United We Fall: Boardroom Truths About the Beautiful Game making claims about incidents which had contributed to the downfall of Leeds United in the mid-2000s.

David O'Leary called Ridsdale's claims "deranged" and suggested that he was 'two faced' with his comments compared to how the pair's relationship had continued since both had left Leeds.

Martin O’Neill also responded to claims regarding him by stating that he had taken part in discussions with Ridsdale and had signed a conditional statement, but that nothing legally-binding was put in place.

== Other business dealings ==
Ridsdale was managing director of Tulchan Holdings, which successfully acquired Sock Shop from the receiver in 1996.

== Disqualification ==
Ridsdale's sports consultancy firm WH Sports Group Limited, which provided advice to football clubs from 2003, failed in 2009 with debts of more than £475,000. Ridsdale was found to have diverted payments by football clubs totalling £347,000, due to the company, into his personal bank account. In October 2012, he was disqualified as a company director until April 2020 after an inquiry by the Insolvency Service. His wife Sophie Ridsdale was likewise banned from acting as a director of any company until 2016.

Responding to the ban, Ridsdale claimed that he was currently only acting as Chairman of Football at Preston North End, not as a director.

Business positions
Preceded by Bill Fotherby	Leeds United F.C. chairman 1997–2003	Succeeded by Professor John McKenzie
Preceded by John Dennis	Barnsley F.C. chairman 2003–2004	Succeeded by Gordon Shepherd
Preceded by Sam Hammam	Cardiff City F.C. chairman 2006–2010	Succeeded by Dato Chan Tien Ghee
Preceded by Sir Roy Gardner	Plymouth Argyle F.C. acting chairman 2011	Succeeded by James Brent
