= Avram Grant =

Israeli association football manager (born 1955)

Avram Grant אברהם "אברם" גרנט
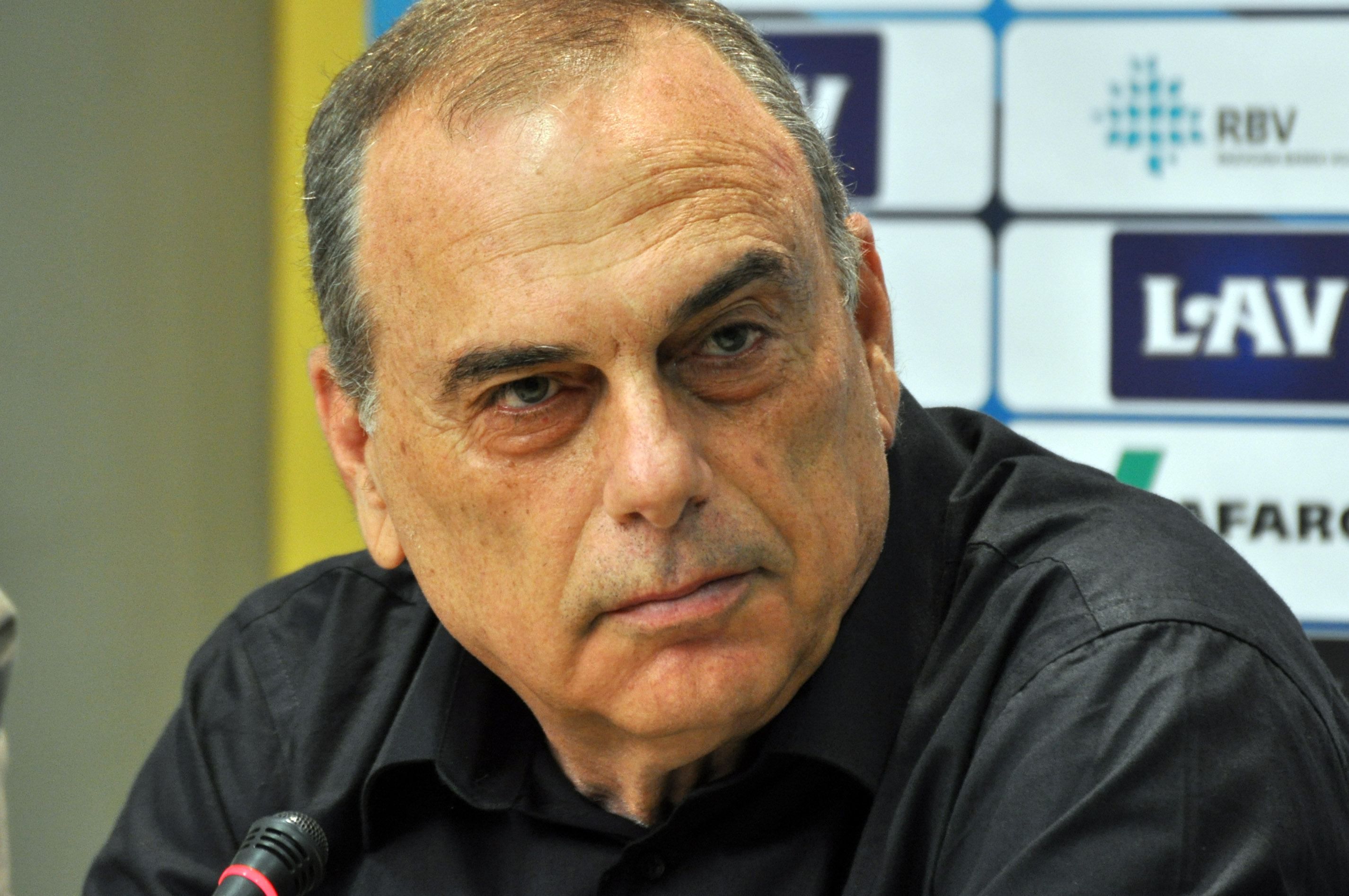
- Grant as FK Partizan coach in 2012

Personal information
- Full name: Avraham Grant
- Birth name: Avraham Granat
- Date of birth: 6 February 1955 (age 71)
- Place of birth: Petah Tikva, Israel

Managerial career
- Years: Team
- 1972–1986: Hapoel Petah Tikva (youth)
- 1986–1991: Hapoel Petah Tikva
- 1991–1995: Maccabi Tel Aviv
- 1995–1996: Hapoel Haifa
- 1996–2000: Maccabi Tel Aviv
- 2000–2002: Maccabi Haifa
- 2002–2006: Israel
- 2007–2008: Chelsea
- 2009–2010: Portsmouth
- 2010–2011: West Ham United
- 2012: Partizan Belgrade
- 2014–2017: Ghana
- 2018: NorthEast United (interim)
- 2022–2025: Zambia
Medal record
Men's football
Representing Ghana (as manager)
Africa Cup of Nations
Runner-up	2015

Avraham "Avram" Grant (Hebrew: אברהם "אברם" גרנט; né Granat; born 6 February 1955) is an Israeli professional football manager who has spent the majority of his career coaching and managing in Israel, winning a number of national league and cup victories with different teams, and also managing the Israel national team for four years.

Grant moved to England in 2006 to become technical director of Portsmouth before being appointed director of football at Chelsea in July 2007. Two months later, in September 2007, following the departure of José Mourinho, Grant was appointed as Chelsea's manager. Despite steering the team into the Champions League and League Cup finals, as well as contesting the Premier League title to the last day, his contract was terminated at the end of the season.

Grant returned to Portsmouth as director of football in October 2009, and was made manager the following month. After the club's relegation to the Football League Championship Grant resigned and, in June 2010, was appointed as manager of West Ham United, a role he held up until May 2011, when he was sacked after the club was relegated to the Football League Championship.

After one championship season managing Partizan Belgrade and one season as the technical director for Thai club BEC Tero Sasana, Grant was appointed coach of the Ghana national football team in 2014. He stepped down from the position after a defeat in the semi-finals of the 2017 Africa Cup of Nations.

In January 2018, Grant moved to India to join the Indian Super League side NorthEast United as a technical advisor, a day after the team head coach João de Deus was sacked due to a poor start.

== Biography ==
Avraham Granat was born in Petah Tikva, Israel. His father, Meir Granat, was born into a devout Orthodox Jewish family in Mława, Poland. Meir's family fled to the Soviet Union in 1941, during the Holocaust; there they were exiled to Kolyma, Siberia, where most of the family died. In a 2008 interview his father recalled burying his grandfather, Avraham Granat—after whom Grant was named—with his own hands. After being repatriated to Poland after the war's end in 1945, Meir emigrated to the British Mandate of Palestine (now Israel) in violation of the policy of that time, and was arrested and detained in Cyprus. He ultimately settled in Petah Tikva, where he and Grant's mother Aliza Nisan, an Iraqi-Jewish immigrant to Israel, met.

Grant shortened his surname from Granat in the late 1980s. He was married to Israeli television personality Tzufit Grant. They have a son and a daughter. The couple have announced they split up in September 2014.

In October 2009, Grant's father died aged 82 from complications following surgery to remove a kidney stone. Grant had flown to Israel and was by his side.

On 20 February 2008, Chelsea Football Club announced that Grant had received anti-Semitic death threats from unknown sources. One of the packages sent to Grant's home was said to have contained a white powder that, after investigation, proved to be harmless.

On 4 February 2010, it was reported that Grant was facing police questioning over an incident on 18 December 2009 at a Thai brothel in Horton Heath, Hampshire.

On 13 June 2016, following extensive research into his father's Polish-Jewish heritage, Grant received his Polish passport from the Polish Embassy in London. His Polish passport has his name written as Abraham Grant.

== Career ==
=== Israel ===
Grant's professional coaching career started at age 18, in 1972, as youth coach of his home-town team, Hapoel Petah Tikva. In 1986, after a 14-year spell in this job, he was promoted to first team coach, leading the club to two Toto Cup victories, in 1990 and 1991, thus bringing Hapoel Petah Tikva back to the top of Israeli football after nearly 25 years. During this era Petah Tikva fought regularly for the championship against Shlomo Scharf's Maccabi Haifa. In his last season in Petah Tikva, Grant lost both the championship and the Israel State Cup within 3 days to Maccabi Haifa, in a chain of events which is commonly known in Israel as "the Double robbery". The next year the club won its first major title in 30 years, by winning its second-ever Israeli Cup.

The following season Grant moved to coach Maccabi Tel Aviv winning Liga Leumit (then the top division) in his first season with them, with a 13-point advantage over the second place team. Maccabi Tel Aviv lost out closely in the final of the Israeli Cup and was thus denied a historic double. The cup was won by Maccabi Tel Aviv under Grant's control, however, in 1994, followed with another championship in 1995.

Following this, Grant moved to Hapoel Haifa for what has been described as a short and unsuccessful spell, finishing fourth in the Israeli championship. Grant returned to Maccabi Tel Aviv between 1997 and 2000, although this period was less successful than his previous one at the club, winning just the Toto Cup in 1999.

Grant moved to Maccabi Haifa in 2000, where he coached until 2002. There, he led the team to great success, winning the Israeli Premier League in 2001 and 2002, as well as the Toto Cup in 2002, whilst narrowly missing out on the Israeli Cup, to miss winning the treble. In 2001 the club participated in the 2nd qualifying round of the UEFA Champions League competition against the Finnish team FC Haka. Despite winning both legs (1–0 and 4–0) with an aggregate score of 5–0 the club did not progress further. The use of Walid Badir as a substitute in the final ten minutes of the second leg while under suspension caused disqualification on the grounds of "culpable negligence" and FC Haka proceeded to the next round against Liverpool.

==== Israeli national team ====
After leaving Haifa in 2002, Grant became the youngest team coach of Israel, replacing the former Denmark coach Richard Møller Nielsen. The team participated in Group 1 of the UEFA Euro 2004 qualifying round but finished third and so did not take part in the finals in Portugal.

Although not qualifying for the 2006 World Cup, Israel finished third in their qualifying group behind winners France and runners-up Switzerland. Israel missed on qualification to the finals, despite remaining undefeated in the group with four wins and six draws.

==== Management style ====
Grant is known in Israel for giving a chance to young players in almost every club he coached, such as Alon Hazan and goalkeeper Raffi Cohen at Petah Tikva, Avi Nimni and Itzik Zohar at Maccabi Tel Aviv, Gal Alberman in the Israeli team, and many more. Grant famously did not include Israeli star Eyal Berkovic in the national squad during 2005, saying he wanted to create "a younger team", but, nonetheless, retaining 34-year-old Avi Nimni. In 2007, Berkovic described the way Grant became Chelsea's manager as "disgusting" and "disrespectful". Another known critic of Grant in Israel is Shlomo Scharf, who was Israel's coach during most of the 1990s.

Grant, as is also the case with another coach from Petah Tikva, past Israel coach Dror Kashtan, is considered one of the most successful Israeli coaches. He has a reputation of a lucky winner in Israel, which caused the invention of the frequently used humorous term 'Hatachat shel Avram'. This means 'Avram's Ass', a reference to the allegedly large amount of luck Grant enjoyed during the 2006 World Cup campaign.

Congolese forward Lomana LuaLua, presently with Blackpool of the English Premier League, stated that it was Grant's encouragement and emotional support that kept him from ending his career after the loss of his son Yoshuha to pneumonia. Grant was director of football at Portsmouth during LuaLua's stint at the club.

=== England ===
In October 2005, Grant announced that he would step down from the national team as his contract was due to expire in June of the following year. Subsequently, he took up the position of Technical Director at Portsmouth in June 2006, overseeing Harry Redknapp's side.

==== Chelsea ====
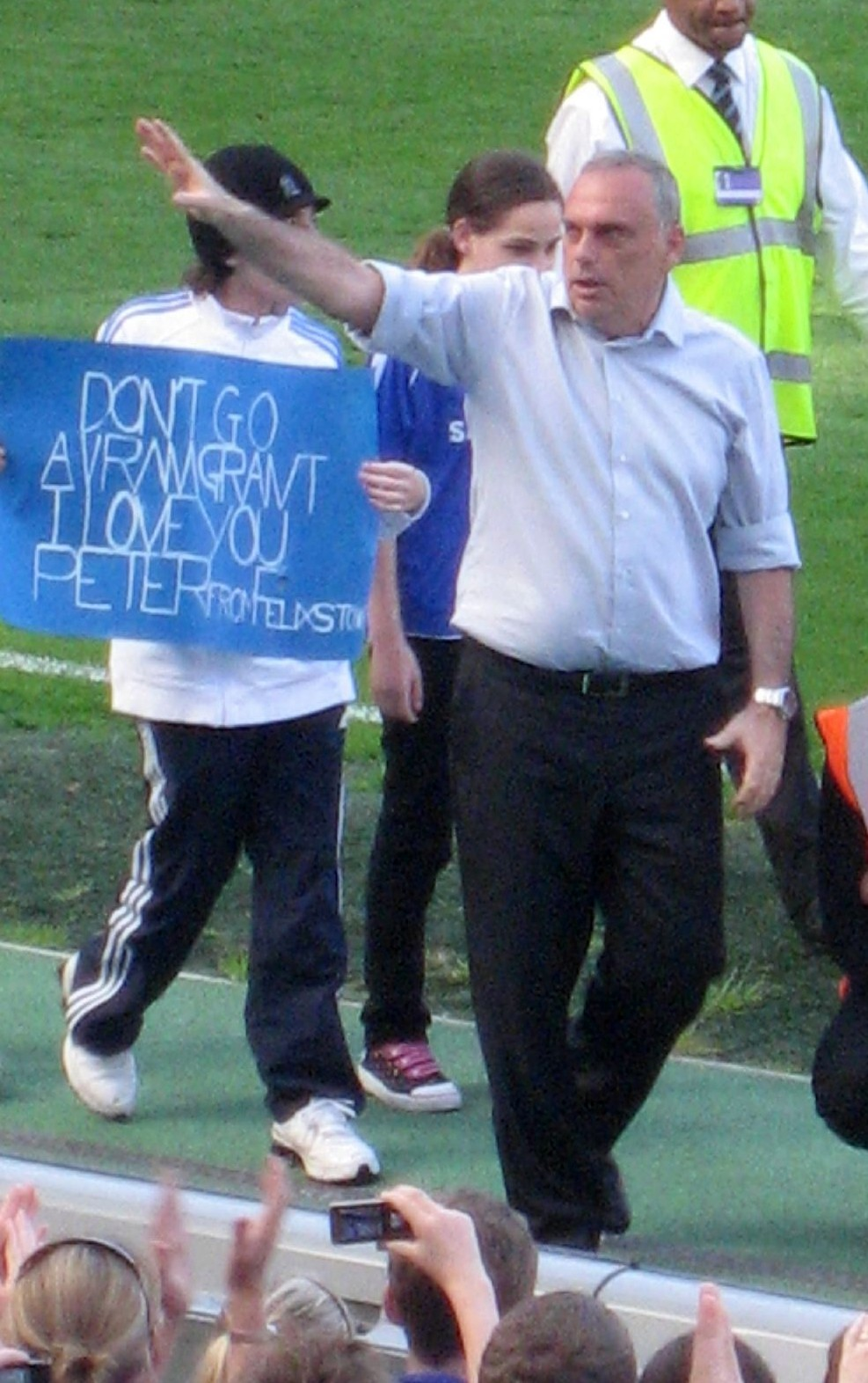
Grant with Chelsea

A personal friend of Roman Abramovich, on 8 July 2007 Avram Grant was appointed Director of Football at Chelsea FC. After the departure of José Mourinho from Chelsea on 20 September 2007, Grant was assigned the manager's role, with Steve Clarke, and later Henk ten Cate (on 11 October 2007) as his assistants, and becoming the first Israeli to manage an English football club.

When he took the helm at Chelsea, Grant did not hold the required top-flight coaching certification from UEFA. In fact, he had never received the lower-level coaching certifications from UEFA for "B" and "A" level coaching in Europe. Many Chelsea fans did not take well to Grant's appointment. They protested Mourinho's departure, holding banners at games, which read "Mourinho – The Special One", and chanting Mourinho's name. Chelsea stated that some of the protests directed towards Grant constituted abuse of a racist nature. Bruce Buck, chairman of Chelsea, claimed they had received points of view which are racist and anti-semitic. Buck stated: "[This] unfairly smears the reputation of the vast majority of the Chelsea fans who rightly do not want to be associated with such activity." . However, many Chelsea fans felt their objections against Grant being appointed as the team's manager are justified, citing his "lack of expertise at the highest levels of football" and Grant's lack of a formal UEFA qualification as manager.

Several unnamed Chelsea players were quoted as saying Grant's methods were "25 years behind the times" and "Chelsea deserve a bigger coach than him. Grant does not have the quality to coach a team like this. When we play big opponents we will suffer because of him." At least one of Grant's staff told friends that they considered leaving the club.

Grant faced his first game only 3 days after taking up the manager's role, losing 2–0 to Manchester United on 24 September. At his first UEFA Champions League match as a coach (with Chelsea and in general) he led Chelsea to a 2–1 away win over Valencia, replicating one of Mourinho's most celebrated wins. Chelsea went on to register a 16-game unbeaten run under Grant, including beating Manchester City 6–0 in one of Chelsea's biggest wins. Subsequently, Grant was offered and signed a four-year contract with Chelsea in December 2007.

In January 2008, Nicolas Anelka from Bolton Wanderers, Branislav Ivanović from Lokomotiv Moscow, and Franco Di Santo from Audax Italiano were added to Grant's Chelsea squad.

In February, Chelsea reached the 2008 League Cup Final, their first competition final under Grant's management. They lost 2–1 to Tottenham Hotspur at Wembley Stadium on 24 February, with an extra time winner from centre-back Jonathan Woodgate. On 8 March, at Barnsley, Chelsea were eliminated from the FA Cup 1–0. On 23 March, Grant secured his first win against one of the other big four clubs when Chelsea came from behind after two substitutions that were ridiculed by Chelsea fans to beat Arsenal 2–1. On 26 April, Grant got his second big win when Chelsea beat Manchester United 2–1, to move Chelsea into second place in the Premier League level on points with first place Manchester United with two games remaining in the season. They eventually finished the season in second place, as the team had done the previous year.

Grant was chosen as Premier League Manager of the Month in April in his first season as Chelsea's manager.

On 30 April 2008, Grant's Chelsea beat Liverpool 3–2 (4–3 on aggregate) to advance to the 2008 UEFA Champions League Final, something they failed to achieve under former manager José Mourinho. Chelsea drew 1–1 with Manchester United in the final, only to lose out on the European Cup in a penalty shootout which United won 6–5. In the heavy rain, John Terry slipped on his team's fifth penalty, clipping the ball off the post and wide. Had he scored, Chelsea would have won the tournament.

Three days later, at around 6 pm on 24 May 2008, Chelsea announced in a statement on its website that Grant's contract had been terminated with immediate effect. Grant later revealed that he turned down the opportunity to return to the club in his former role as director of football. Just as his predecessor José Mourinho had done, Grant completed his period as Chelsea manager without losing a single home game in the Premier League.

==== Portsmouth ====
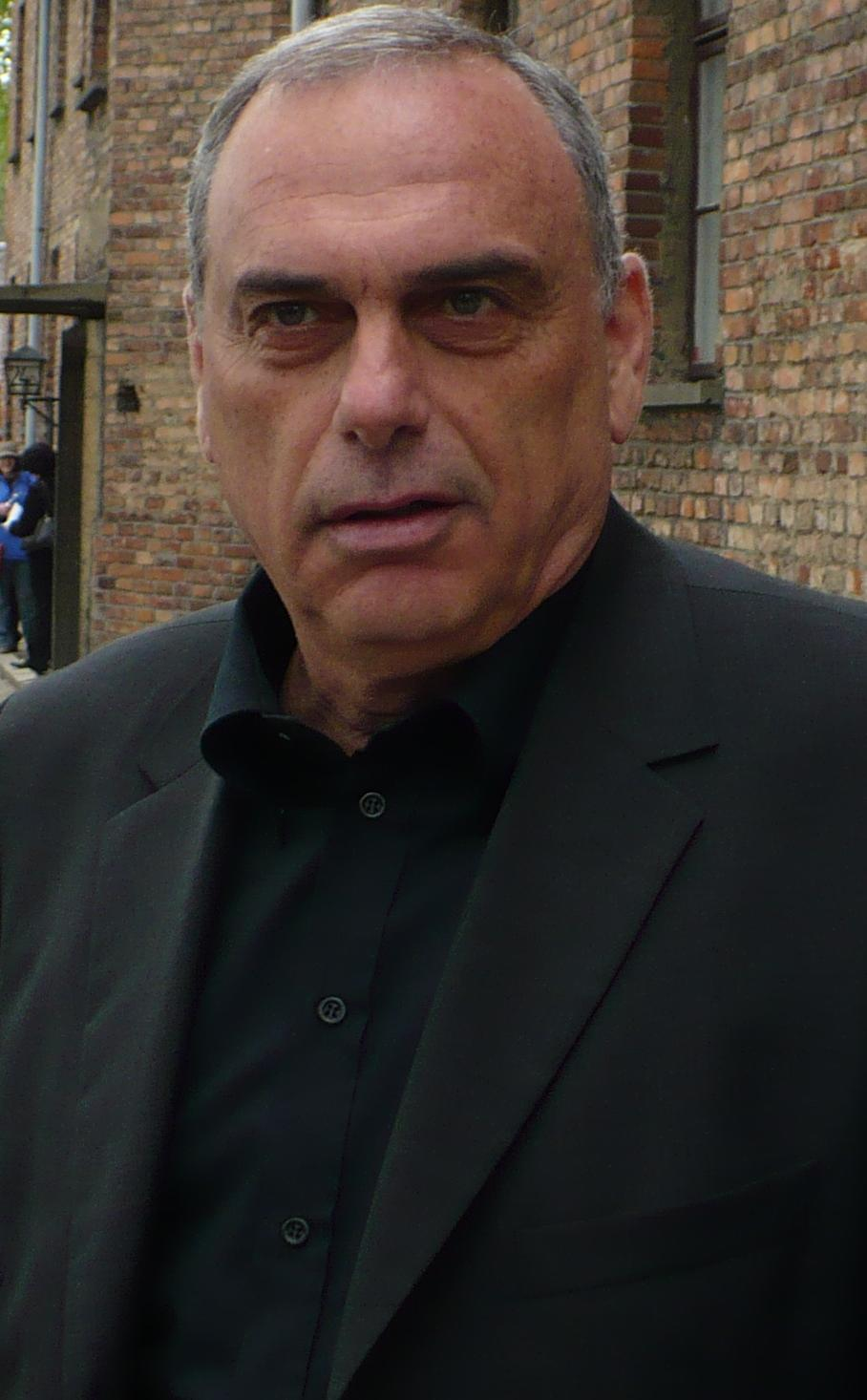
Grant in 2008

On 7 October 2009, Grant returned to Portsmouth as their new Director of football, following the purchase of the club by Ali al-Faraj. On 26 November 2009, following the release of Paul Hart, Grant was confirmed as the new manager of the club. His first game as manager was a 4–1 defeat at home to Manchester United on 28 November 2009. This was followed by a 4–2 home defeat to Aston Villa in the League Cup. His first win with Pompey arrived in the Premier League on 5 December 2009, with a 2–0 win over Burnley Following this he led Portsmouth to a 2–0 win over Liverpool to bring his new side level on points at the foot of the table. Although Portsmouth went into administration in March 2010 and had nine points deducted as a result (contributing to their eventual relegation in bottom place), Grant oversaw a run to the FA Cup final which saw them narrowly beaten by his old club Chelsea at Wembley Stadium. On 20 May 2010, Grant resigned as the manager of Portsmouth. He announced his decision to leave in an open letter to fans on the club's website, stating that "it was the hardest decision I have ever had to make". He went on to say that Portsmouth's fans had brought tears to his eyes with their loyalty, devotion and passion for the club.

==== West Ham United ====
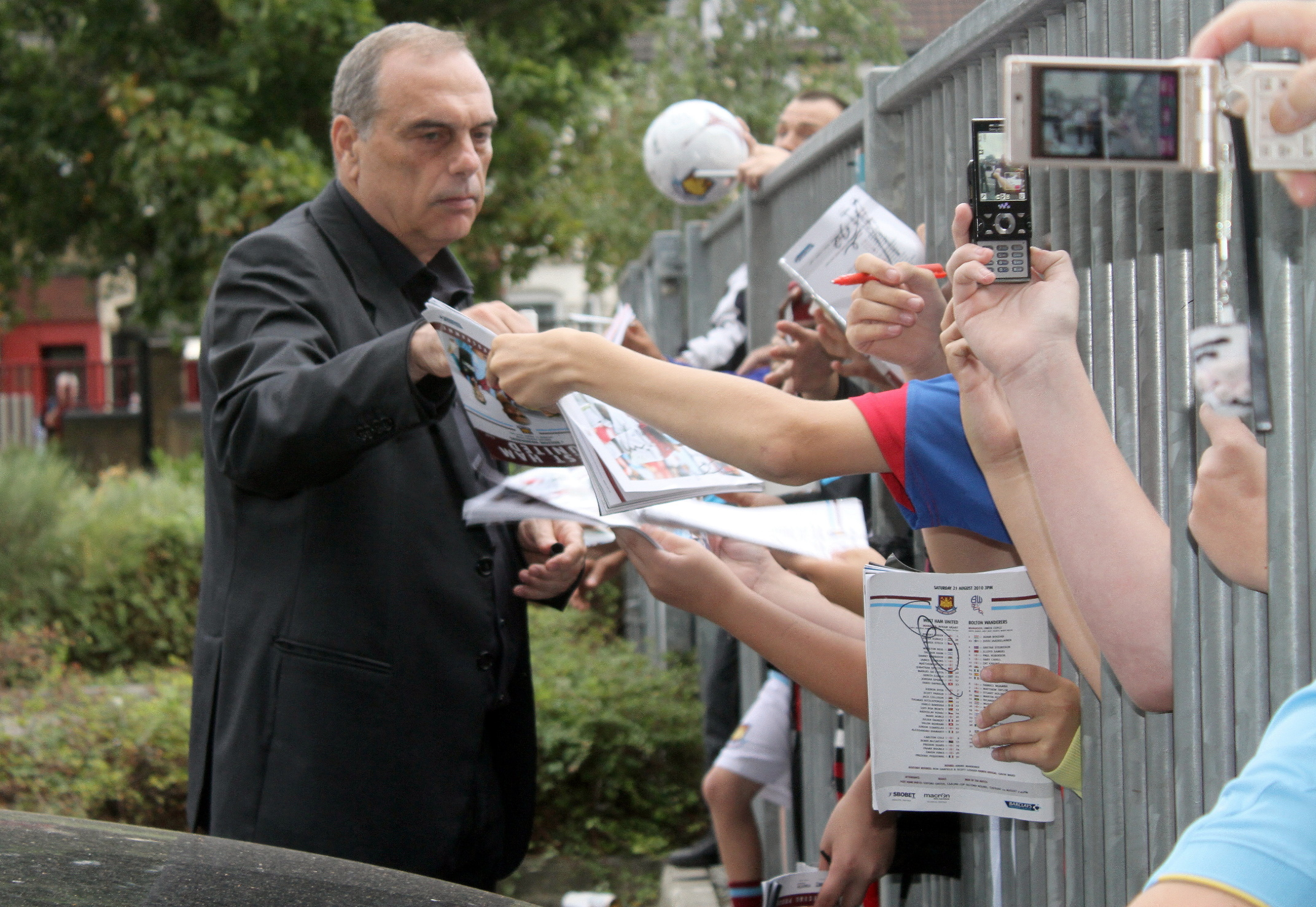
Grant signing autographs post match West Ham United v Bolton Wanderers 21 August 2010

On 3 June 2010, Grant signed a four-year deal with West Ham subject to a work permit which was secured on 8 June. Grant said: "I am proud and honoured to be the manager of West Ham. It will be an exciting challenge and I'm ready to do my best". On 5 June 2010, Thomas Hitzlsperger became Grant's first signing at the club on a free transfer. At the beginning of the 2010–11 season, Grant led West Ham to its worst-ever start in the Premier League. Their first point being gained on 18 September with Grant unable to take charge of the team for a game at Stoke City in respect to his Jewish holy day, Yom Kippur and assistant coach Paul Groves, Kevin Keen and assistant manager Željko Petrović taking charge of the game.

A dismal start to the 2010–11 season saw Grant come under fire after the Hammers had won just two Premier League games by the end of November and stood bottom of the table. However, there was some much needed cause for celebration on 30 November 2010 when his side beat Manchester United 4–0 in the Football League Cup quarter-final. West Ham became the first side to beat Alex Ferguson's team in any competition this season, and were semi-finalists in the competition for the first time since the 1989–90 season.

However, the dismissal of Blackburn Rovers manager Sam Allardyce on 13 December 2010 was followed by media reports that West Ham were on the verge of dismissing Grant and offering Allardyce his job. Indeed, it was reported Grant was handed an unusual ultimatum: win one of the next three games or face losing his job.

A 3–1 win at Fulham on Boxing Day—West Ham's first away win of the season—appeared to ease the pressure on Grant, as did a 2–0 home win over fellow strugglers Wolverhampton Wanderers on New Year's Day, which lifted the Hammers out of the relegation zone. However, a 5–0 defeat at Newcastle United on 5 January put Grant's position in further doubt as the Hammers slid back to the bottom of the table. The pressure became intense with another defeat on 15 January, as many media sources reported that Martin O'Neill would replace him as manager, only to later find that O'Neill ruled himself out of the job.

West Ham won only seven Premier League games, under Grant, from 37 played in a season where they won more cup games than league fixtures. During an away game to Wigan Athletic on 15 May 2011 (a match which West Ham had to win to have any chance of avoiding relegation) a plane flew over the ground trailing a banner reading "Avram Grant – Millwall legend", a sarcastic reference to West Ham's fierce local rivalry with Millwall. West Ham lost 3–2 ensuring their relegation from the Premier League. Grant was sacked that day, hours after the end of the match.

=== Partizan Belgrade ===
On 13 January 2012, Partizan Belgrade's board of directors announced in an official statement to the public that Avram Grant was named the new manager of the club. As Grant was set to have his first match as manager of Partizan in a friendly match against Sepahan Isfahan, the friendly match was cancelled because Grant is Israeli. This was due to the fact that the Iranian government does not recognise Israel as a country and refers to its government as the 'Zionist regime'. Grant's response was:

I never mixed politics with sports, I had worked with many (Muslims) while I was in England, and I made friends with many of them.

After guiding Partizan to their fifth consecutive Serbian championship, Grant resigned on 14 May 2012, making use of the release clause in his 18-month contract.

=== Ghana ===
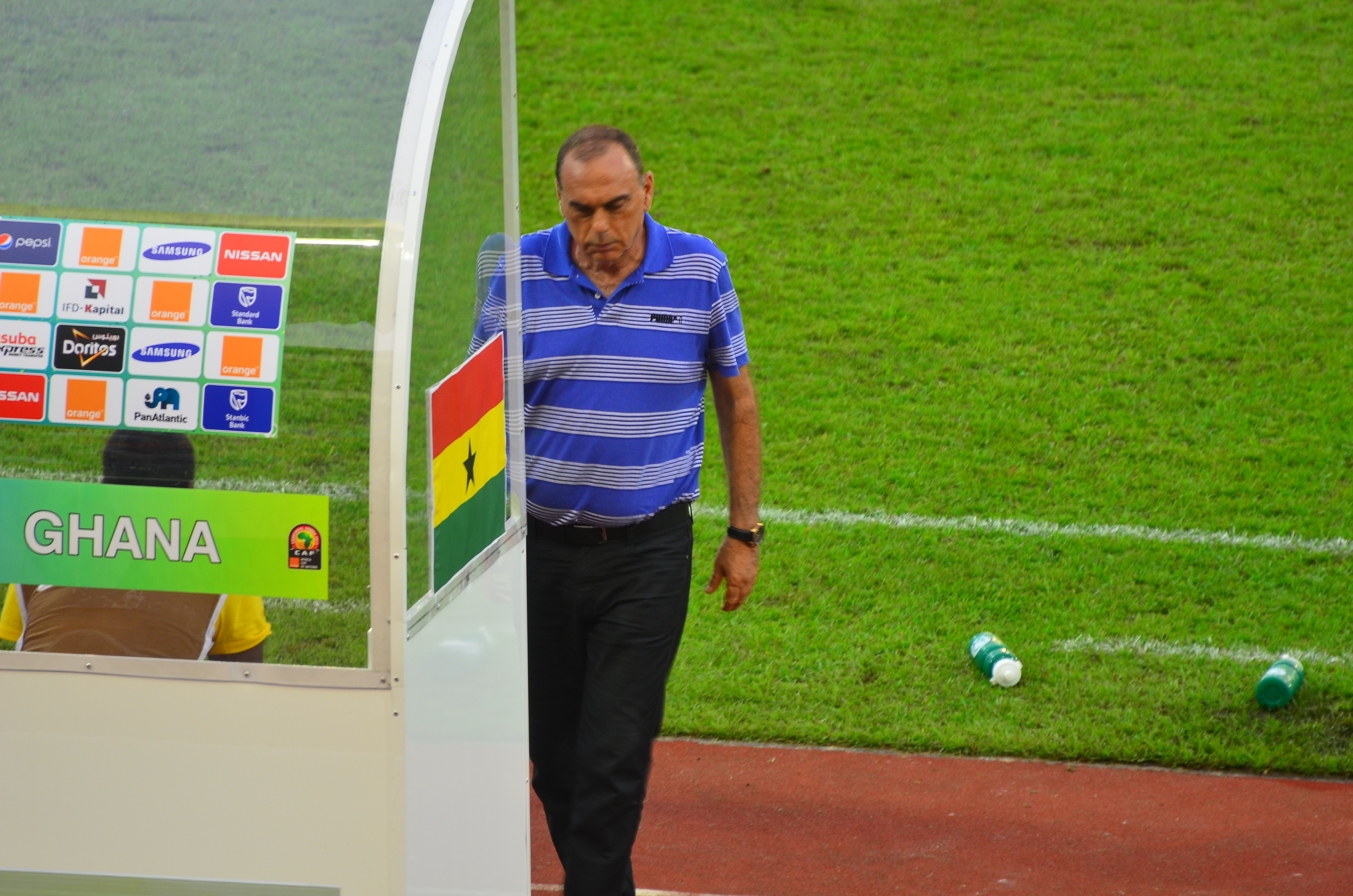
Grant as a coach of Ghana

On 27 November 2014, Grant was appointed as coach of the Ghana national football team. At the 2015 Africa Cup of Nations, he led Ghana to the final, where they were beaten on a penalty shoot-out by Ivory Coast, ending the tournament as runners-up.

On 2 February 2017, Grant resigned as the coach of Ghana after finishing fourth in the 2017 Africa Cup of Nations, losing against Cameroon in the semi-final and Burkina Faso in the third place play-off.

=== NorthEast United ===
Grant joined Indian Super League side NorthEast United FC as a technical advisor on 4 January 2018. He was later promoted to Head Coach on 12 January 2018. The team won 2 out of the first 3 games under Grant, and Seiminlen Doungel scored the club's first ever hat-trick, but the team failed to win a single match after that, ending the season at the bottom of the league points table. Grant was the first head coach from an Asian country in the Indian Super League.

=== Zambia ===
On 22 December 2022, Grant was unveiled as the new manager of the Zambia national football team after signing a two-year deal. On 29 October 2025, Grant parted ways with Zambia on mutual agreement after a series of poor performance and failure to qualify for the 2026 FIFA World Cup.

== Managerial statistics ==
As of match played 12 October 2025

Team	Nat	From	To	Record				
Team	Nat	From	To	G	W	D	L	Win %
Hapoel Petah Tikva	(Israel)	1986	1991	158	72	52	34	45.57
Maccabi Tel Aviv	(Israel)	1991	1995	193	125	31	37	64.77
Hapoel Haifa	(Israel)	1995	1996	30	19	7	4	63.33
Maccabi Tel Aviv	(Israel)	1996	2000	172	87	29	56	50.58
Maccabi Haifa	(Israel)	2000	2002	77	48	21	8	62.34
Israel	(Israel)	2002	2005	33	14	13	6	42.42
Chelsea	(England)	20 September 2007	24 May 2008	54	36	12	6	66.67
Portsmouth	(England)	26 November 2009	21 May 2010	33	10	7	16	30.30
West Ham United	(England)	3 June 2010	16 May 2011	47	15	12	20	31.91
Partizan	(Serbia)	13 January 2012	14 May 2012	16	11	2	3	68.75
Ghana	(Ghana)	27 November 2014	6 February 2017	27	12	8	7	44.44
NorthEast United	(India)	4 January 2018	17 March 2018	17	2	1	14	11.76
Zambia	(Zambia)	22 December 2022	29 October 2025	43	17	7	19	39.53
Total				900	468	202	230	52.00

== Honours ==
Hapoel Petah Tikva

- Toto Cup Leumit: 1989–90, 1990–91

Maccabi Tel Aviv

- Liga Leumit: 1991–92, 1994–95
- Israel State Cup: 1993–94
- Toto Cup Leumit: 1992–93, 1998–99

Maccabi Haifa

- Israeli Premier League: 2000–01, 2001–02
- Toto Cup Al: 2001–02

Chelsea

- Football League Cup runner-up: 2007–08
- UEFA Champions League runner-up: 2007–08

Portsmouth

- FA Cup runner-up: 2009–10

Partizan Belgrade

- Serbian SuperLiga: 2011–12

Individual

- Premier League Manager of the Month: April 2008

== See also ==
- List of Jews in sports (non-players)
- Sports in Israel
