= Chan Tien Ghee =

Malaysian businessman

- 曾长义
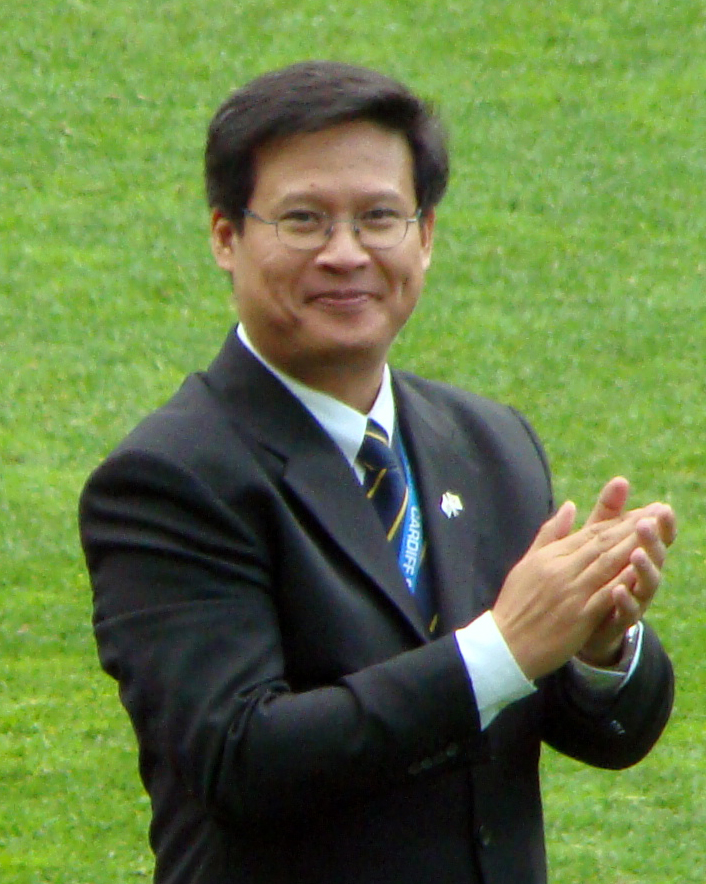
- Occupations: Businessman, Fmr Chairman of Cardiff City
- Children: Nicholas Chan

Dato Chan Tien Ghee (simplified Chinese: 曾长义; traditional Chinese: 曾長義; pinyin: Zēng Cháng Yì; Jyutping: Zang1 Coeng4 Ji6; Pe̍h-ōe-jī: Chan Tióng-gī), more commonly known as TG, is a Malaysian businessman, who was the chairman of Cardiff City Football Club from May 2010 to March 2013.

== Cardiff City ==
Chan Tien Ghee became chairman on 27 May 2010. His aim was to get Cardiff into the Premier League and stated that Dave Jones would carry on being manager, whilst also hiring Gethin Jenkins from Newport Gwent Dragons to become Chief Executive of the club. However, Cardiff failed to get promoted at the end of his first season as chairman. He resigned the position as chairman in March 2013, to pursue other business opportunities.

== Personal life ==
Tien Ghee is the father of the Malaysian footballer that was playing for Kelantan FA in 2011 season, Nicholas Chan.

Business positions
| Preceded by Peter Ridsdale | Cardiff City F.C. chairman 2010–2013 | Succeeded by Mehmet Dalman |
