= John Ryan (businessman) =

English entrepreneur (born 1950)

Personal information
- Date of birth: 1 May 1950 (age 76)
- Place of birth: Doncaster, England
- Position: Striker

Senior career*
Years	Team	Apps	(Gls)
2003	Doncaster Rovers	1	(0)
- * Club domestic league appearances and goals

John Ryan (born 1 May 1950) is a British entrepreneur involved in the cosmetic surgery industry, and the former chairman of his hometown club Doncaster Rovers.

== Career ==
After expanding a cosmetic surgery company, which he sold in 2002, he created his own MYA (Make Yourself Amazing) line of surgical clinics in 2007. Ryan has written an autobiography, Dare To Dream, which has been on sale since February 2010.

Ryan entered The Guinness Book of Records as the oldest footballer to appear for a professional British club when he came on as a substitute in the 89th minute for Doncaster Rovers against Hereford United in a Conference National match on 26 April 2003, at the age of 52 years and 11 months. He was allocated the number 28.
