= Balram Chainrai =

Nepali-British businessman

- बलराम चैनराई
- Born: October 1958; Okhaldhunga District, Nepal
- Other name: Balu Chainrai
- Occupation: Businessman
- Known for: Former owner of Portsmouth F.C.
- Children: Karan Chainrai
- Parent: P. G. Chainrai
- Website: www.chainrai.com

Balram Chainrai (Nepali: बलराम चैनराई; born October 1958) is a British businessman of Nepali Sindhi origin. He is the son of P. G. Chainrai, a former soldier in the British Gorkha Army. Chainrai was born in Okhaldhunga District, Nepal, and later moved to Hong Kong, where he established a career in business. He is fluent in Cantonese, English, and Sindhi.

== Early life and education ==
Balram Chainrai was born in October 1958 in Okhaldhunga District, Nepal. His family relocated to Hong Kong at an early stage in his life, where he received his education. Growing up in a multicultural environment, Chainrai developed proficiency in multiple languages, which later facilitated his international business ventures.

== Business career ==
Chainrai began his business career in Hong Kong, where he established Hornington Enterprises Limited in 1984. The company initially focused on the manufacture and trade of electronic goods, home appliances, and toys, later expanding into the distribution of computers and related accessories. The company also engaged in trade finance activities.

Over time, Hornington Enterprises expanded its operations into various markets, including Asia, the Middle East, and Europe. Chainrai later diversified his business interests into sectors such as real estate development, hospitality, entertainment, and renewable energy, with a particular focus on solar power projects.

== Philanthropy and social contributions ==
Chainrai has been involved in philanthropic efforts, supporting various charitable initiatives. He has been a member of Rotary International and has participated in business and trade organizations. From 2001 to 2006, he served as the vice chairman of the Indian Chamber of Commerce in Hong Kong, later becoming its president in 2007. In this role, he contributed to trade delegations and business collaborations involving Hong Kong government officials and business leaders.

He is also associated with "The One," a charitable organization that recognizes individuals for their contributions to social causes. His philanthropic focus includes education, healthcare, and community development.

== Involvement in football ==
Balram Chainrai became widely known for his involvement with Portsmouth F.C., an English football club that was facing financial difficulties. He acquired a controlling interest in the club in 2009 through his company, Portpin. His tenure as owner was marked by efforts to stabilize the club’s financial situation, but he later relinquished ownership.

== Personal life ==
Balram Chainrai is married and has a son, Karan Chainrai, who has been involved in the family's business ventures. Karan is recently married to Shania Ratnani. The Chainrai family maintains ties with both Hong Kong and Nepal.
