= 1985–86 Cardiff City F.C. season =

Welsh football club season

Cardiff City
1985–86 season
- Chairman: Jack Leonard
- Manager: Alan Durban
- Football League Third Division: 22nd
- FA Cup: 1st round
- League Cup: 1st round
- Welsh Cup: Semi-finals
- Freight Rover Trophy: Preliminary round
- Top goalscorer: League: Nigel Vaughan (12); All: Nigel Vaughan (17)
- Highest home attendance: 9,375 (v Swansea, 26 December 1985)
- Lowest home attendance: 1,777 (v Walsall, 5 April 1986)
- Average home league attendance: 3,433

The 1985–86 season was Cardiff City F.C.'s 59th season in the Football League. They competed in the 24-team Division Three, then the third tier of English football, finishing twenty-second, suffering relegation to Division Four.

At the end of the season manager Alan Durban was sacked as manager. It ended a disastrous spell in charge as the team suffered two relegations in two years.

== Players ==
First team squad. Note: Flags indicate national team as defined under FIFA eligibility rules; some limited exceptions apply. Players may hold more than one non-FIFA nationality.

Pos.	Nation	Player
GK	WAL	Mel Rees
GK	WAL	Chris Sander
GK	ENG	Lee Smelt
DF	ENG	Phil Brignull
DF	ENG	John Carver
DF	ENG	David Corner
DF	WAL	Wayne Curtis
DF	ENG	Mike Ford
DF	SCO	Jake King
DF	ENG	Carleton Leonard
DF	ENG	Jimmy Mullen
DF	WAL	Allen Price
DF	ENG	Andy Spring
DF	WAL	Nigel Stevenson
MF	ENG	Derrick Christie
MF	WAL	Richard Evans

Pos.	Nation	Player
MF	WAL	Brian Flynn
MF	ENG	Roger Gibbins
MF	WAL	David Giles
MF	WAL	Jason Gummer
MF	WAL	Chris Marustik
MF	ENG	Paul McLoughlin
MF	WAL	Tarki Micallef
MF	WAL	Tim O'Connor
MF	ENG	David Tong
MF	WAL	Nigel Vaughan
MF	ENG	Paul Wheeler
FW	ENG	Mark Farrington
FW	ENG	Will Foley
FW	ENG	Kevin Meacock
FW	WAL	Gerry Nardiello
FW	ENG	Robbie Turner
FW	ENG	Graham Withey

== League standings ==
Pos	Team	Pld	W	D	L	GF	GA	GD	Pts	Promotion or relegation
20	Bury	46	12	13	21	63	67	−4	49	
21	Lincoln City (R)	46	10	16	20	55	77	−22	46	Relegation to the Fourth Division
22	Cardiff City (R)	46	12	9	25	53	83	−30	45	Relegation to the Fourth Division
23	Wolverhampton Wanderers (R)	46	11	10	25	57	98	−41	43	Relegation to the Fourth Division
24	Swansea City (R)	46	11	10	25	43	87	−44	43	Relegation to the Fourth Division

(R) Relegated

=== Results by round ===
Round	1	2	3	4	5	6	7	8	9	10	11	12	13	14	15	16	17	18	19	20	21	22	23	24	25	26	27	28	29	30	31	32	33	34	35	36	37	38	39	40	41	42	43	44	45	46
Ground	A	H	A	H	A	H	H	A	H	A	H	A	H	A	H	A	A	H	A	H	A	A	H	H	A	H	A	H	A	H	H	A	H	A	A	H	A	H	H	A	H	A	A	H	A	H
Result	W	L	W	L	D	L	D	L	L	L	L	L	W	L	L	L	L	L	L	D	W	W	W	D	D	W	D	L	L	W	L	L	W	L	D	D	L	L	L	L	D	L	W	W	L	W
Position		11	8	11	12	16	15	18	21	21	21	22	21	21	22	23	24	24	24	24	24	21	21	21	21	19	19	19	20	17	19	20	19	19	19	21	22	22	22	23	24	24	22	21	23	22
Points	3	3	6	6	7	7	8	8	8	8	8	8	11	11	11	11	11	11	11	12	15	18	21	22	23	26	27	27	27	30	30	30	33	33	34	35	35	35	35	35	36	36	39	42	42	45

A = Away; H = Home; W = Win; D = Draw; L = Loss

== Fixtures and results ==
=== Third Division ===
17 August 1985 1	Notts County	1–4	Cardiff City	Nottingham
15:00	Alan Young 47'		8' Paul McLoughlin; 31' Mark Farrington; 58' (pen.) Jimmy Mullen; 37' Nigel Vaughan	Stadium: Meadow Lane; Attendance: 3,856

24 August 1985 2	Cardiff City	0–2	Chesterfield	Cardiff
15:00	Brian Flynn (red card)		21' Phil Brown; 89' Ernie Moss	Stadium: Ninian Park; Attendance: 3,601; Referee: Ron Groves (Weston)

26 August 1985 3	Newport County	1–2	Cardiff City	Newport
11:00	Roy Carter		(pen.) Jimmy Mullen; Nigel Vaughan	Stadium: Somerton Park; Attendance: 5,027

31 August 1985 4	Cardiff City	1–3	Reading	Cardiff
15:00	Paul McLoughlin 60'		6' Trevor Senior; Trevor Senior; Trevor Senior	Stadium: Ninian Park; Attendance: 3,539; Referee: Paul Vanes (West Midlands)

7 September 1985 5	York City	1–1	Cardiff City	York
15:00	Chris Evans 86'		39' Mike Ford	Stadium: Bootham Crescent; Attendance: 3,760; Referee: Alan Robinson (Fareham)

14 September 1985 6	Cardiff City	1–3	Bristol City	Cardiff
15:00	Graham Withey		Alan Walsh; Alan Walsh; Howard Pritchard	Stadium: Ninian Park; Attendance: 4,412

17 September 1985 7	Cardiff City	0–0	Bury	Cardiff
19:45				Stadium: Ninian Park; Attendance: 2,011

21 September 1985 8	Blackpool	3–0	Cardiff City	Blackpool
15:00	Mike Davies 57'; Eamon O'Keefe 82'; John Deary 88'			Stadium: Bloomfield Road; Attendance: 3,783

28 September 1985 9	Cardiff City	0–2	Derby County	Cardiff
15:00			(pen.) Ross MacLaren; 49' Trevor Christie	Stadium: Ninian Park; Attendance: 3,435

1 October 1985 10	Rotherham United	3–0	Cardiff City	Rotherham
19:30	Mick Gooding; Mick Gooding; Tony Simmons			Stadium: Millmoor; Attendance: 2,906

5 October 1985 11	Cardiff City	0–1	Bournemouth	Cardiff
15:00			8' Chris Shaw	Stadium: Ninian Park; Attendance: 2,156

12 October 1985 12	Gillingham	2–0	Cardiff City	Gillingham
15:00	Keith Oakes 23'; Mark Weatherly 29'	Gillingham report		Stadium: Priestfield Stadium; Attendance: 3,367; Referee: Allan Gunn (Burgess Hill)

19 October 1985 13	Cardiff City	3–1	Wigan Athletic	Cardiff
15:00	Chris Marustik 40'; Robbie Turner 78'; Nigel Vaughan 87'		46' Ian Griffiths	Stadium: Ninian Park; Attendance: 2,020; Referee: Brian Stevens (Stonehouse)

22 October 1985 14	Darlington	4–1	Cardiff City	Darlington
19:30	David McLean; David McLean (pen.); Carl Airey; Carl Airey		Paul McLoughlin	Attendance: 2,446

26 October 1985 15	Cardiff City	0–1	Bolton Wanderers	Cardiff
15:00			Graham Bell	Stadium: Ninian Park; Attendance: 2,502; Referee: Malcolm Cotton (Camberley, Surrey)

2 November 1985 16	Brentford	3–0	Cardiff City	London
15:00	Terry Hurlock; Robbie Cooke; Tony Lynch			Stadium: Griffin Park; Attendance: 3,934

5 November 1985 17	Walsall	6–3	Cardiff City	Walsall
19:30	Craig Shakespeare (?) (?); Steve Elliott (?) (?) (?); Nicky Cross		(pen.) Jimmy Mullen; Derrick Christie; Nigel Vaughan	Stadium: Fellows Park; Attendance: 3,282

8 November 1985 18	Cardiff City	0–1	Doncaster Rovers	Cardiff
19:45	Robbie Turner (red card)		Brian Caswell	Stadium: Ninian Park; Attendance: 2,015; Referee: Keren Barratt (Coventry)

23 November 1985 19	Bristol Rovers	2–1	Cardiff City	Bristol
15:00	Mark O'Connor 1'; Gary Penrice		2' (pen.) Jimmy Mullen	Stadium: Eastville; Attendance: 4,563; Referee: Keith Miller (Harlow)

30 November 1985 20	Cardiff City	1–1	Wolverhampton Wanderers	Cardiff
15:00	Wayne Curtis		61' Andy King	Stadium: Ninian Park; Attendance: 2,453; Referee: Colin Downey (Hounslow)

14 December 1985 21	Lincoln City	0–4	Cardiff City	Lincoln
15:00			50' Nigel Vaughan; Robbie Turner (pen.) Jimmy Mullen; Mark Farrington	Stadium: Sincil Bank; Attendance: 2,127; Referee: Howard Taylor (Oadby, Leicestershire)

20 December 1985 22	Chesterfield	3–4	Cardiff City	Chesterfield
19:30	Steve Spooner; Les Hunter; Mick Henderson		Robbie Turner; Derrick Christie; Nigel Vaughan; Mark Farrington	Stadium: Saltergate; Attendance: 1,773

26 December 1985 23	Cardiff City	1–0	Swansea City	Cardiff
11:00	Nigel Vaughan 88'			Stadium: Ninian Park; Attendance: 9,375; Referee: Ray Lewis (Great Bookham, Surrey)

28 December 1985 24	Cardiff City	1–1	Newport County	Cardiff
15:00	Mike Ford		Gordon Staniforth	Stadium: Ninian Park; Attendance: 7,450; Referee: Gilbert Napthine (Loughborough)

1 January 1986 25	Plymouth Argyle	4–4	Cardiff City	Plymouth
11:00	Garry Nelson; Kevin Summerfield; John Clayton; Kevin Hodges		Robbie Turner; Mike Ford; Nigel Vaughan (pen.) Jimmy Mullen	Stadium: Home Park; Attendance: 8,920; Referee: Les Hamer (Chorley)

4 January 1986 26	Cardiff City	1–0	Brentford	Cardiff
15:00	Nigel Vaughan			Stadium: Ninian Park; Attendance: 3,398; Referee: Alan Seville (Birmingham)

11 January 1986 27	Reading	1–1	Cardiff City	Reading
15:00	Kevin Bremner 80'		51' Mike Ford	Stadium: Elm Park; Attendance: 6,784; Referee: Mike Reed (Birmingham)

18 January 1986 28	Cardiff City	1–3	Notts County	Cardiff
15:00	Jimmy Mullen 45' (pen.)		22' Mick Waitt (o.g.) Jimmy Mullen; 86' Ian McParland	Stadium: Ninian Park; Attendance: 2,410; Referee: Lester Shapter (Paignton)

25 January 1986 29	Bristol City	2–1	Cardiff City	Bristol
15:00	Steve Neville 23'; Gary Marshall 37'		34' Paul Wheeler	Stadium: Ashton Gate; Attendance: 7,541; Referee: Terry Holbrook (Wolverhampton)

31 January 1986 30	Cardiff City	2–1	York City	Cardiff
19:45	Nigel Vaughan 71'; Paul Wheeler 80'		8' Keith Walwyn	Stadium: Ninian Park; Attendance: 2,051; Referee: Ken Baker (Rugby)

4 February 1986 31	Cardiff City	0–1	Darlington	Cardiff
19:45			Garry MacDonald	Stadium: Ninian Park; Attendance: 2,222; Referee: Ron Groves (Weston)

8 February 1986 32	Wigan Athletic	2–0	Cardiff City	Wigan
15:00	Warren Aspinall 71'; David Lowe 82'			Stadium: Springfield Park (Wigan); Attendance: 3,428; Referee: Ron Bridges (Deeside_

22 February 1986 33	Cardiff City	1–0	Blackpool	Cardiff
15:00	Wayne Curtis 60'			Stadium: Ninian Park; Attendance: 2,430; Referee: Tony Ward (London)

1 March 1986 34	Derby County	2–1	Cardiff City	Derby
	John Gregory 70'; Ross MacLaren 89'		57' Nigel Vaughan	Stadium: Baseball Ground; Attendance: 11,014; Referee: DT Phillips (Barnsley)

8 March 1986 35	Bournemouth	1–1	Cardiff City	Bournemouth
15:00	Colin Clarke 21'		78' Robbie Turner	Stadium: Dean Court; Attendance: 2,707; Referee: NS Butler

15 March 1986 36	Cardiff City	1–1	Gillingham	Cardiff
15:00	Jason Gummer 33'	Gillingham report	23' Tony Cascarino	Stadium: Ninian Park; Attendance: 2,505; Referee: Gerald Ashby (Worcester)

22 March 1986 37	Bolton Wanderers	5–0	Cardiff City	Bolton
15:00	Phil Neal 45'; Mark Came 46'; Warren Joyce 56'; Tony Caldwell 62'; George Oghani 80'			Stadium: Burnden Park; Attendance: 4,114; Referee: Colin Seel (Carlisle)

25 March 1986 38	Cardiff City	2–3	Rotherham United	Cardiff
19:45	Paul McLoughlin 7'; Jimmy Mullen 89' (pen.)		31' Alan Birch; 75' Tony Simmons; 88' Tony Simmons	Stadium: Ninian Park; Attendance: 1,863; Referee: Roger Milford (Bristol)

28 March 1986 39	Cardiff City	1–2	Plymouth Argyle	Cardiff
19:45	Gerry Nardiello 49'		14' Kevin Hodges; 32' John Matthews	Stadium: Ninian Park; Attendance: 3,834; Referee: Mike Dimblebee (Stevenage)

31 March 1986 40	Swansea City	2–0	Cardiff City	Swansea
15:00	David Hough 52'; Phil Williams 63'			Stadium: Vetch Field; Attendance: 6,643; Referee: Jeff Bray (Hinckley)

5 April 1986 41	Cardiff City	1–1	Walsall	Cardiff
15:00	Will Foley 3'		24' (o.g.) Phil Brignull	Stadium: Ninian Park; Attendance: 1,777; Referee: R Guy

8 April 1986 42	Bury	3–0	Cardiff City	Bury
19:30	Lee Dixon 52'; Carl Harris 55'; Andy Hill 77'			Stadium: Gigg Lane; Attendance: 1,720

12 April 1986 43	Doncaster Rovers	0–2	Cardiff City	Doncaster
15:00			12' Gerry Nardiello; 25' Gerry Nardiello	Stadium: Belle Vue; Attendance: 2,051

19 April 1986 44	Cardiff City	2–0	Bristol Rovers	Cardiff
15:00	Nick Tanner (o.g.); Nigel Vaughan			Stadium: Ninian Park; Attendance: 2,735

26 April 1986 45	Wolverhampton Wanderers	3–1	Cardiff City	Wolverhampton
	Keith Lockhart 13'; Andy Mutch 18'; Micky Holmes		52' Gerry Nardiello	Stadium: Molineux; Attendance: 3,353; Referee: T Simpson

3 May 1986 46	Cardiff City	2–1	Lincoln City	Cardiff
15:00	Robbie Turner 31'; Robbie Turner 40'		45' Kevin Kilmore	Stadium: Ninian Park; Attendance: 1,904

=== Milk Cup ===
20 August 1985 Round 1 (First Leg)	Cardiff City	2–1	Swansea City	Cardiff
19:45	Brian Flynn 20', 48'		Chris Marustik	Stadium: Ninian Park; Attendance: 4,218; Referee: Alan Seville (Birmingham)

3 September 1985 Round 1 (Second Leg)	Swansea City	3–1 (4–3 agg.)	Cardiff City	Swansea
19:30	Colin Randell 45'; Colin Randell; Colin Pascoe 55'		40' Mark Farrington	Stadium: Vetch Field; Attendance: 4,621

=== FA Cup ===
16 November 1985 Round 1	Exeter City	2–1	Cardiff City	Exeter
15:00	Darren Gale; Darren Gale		Nigel Stevenson	Stadium: St James's Park; Attendance: 2,772; Referee: Bob Hamer (Brislington, Bristol)

=== Welsh Cup ===
26 November 1985 Round 3	Caerleon	2–3	Cardiff City	Caerleon
14:00	Rowberry 13'; Sims 63' (pen.)		Nigel Vaughan; Nigel Vaughan; 85' Chris Marustik	Stadium: Cold Bath Road; Attendance: 500

8 January 1986 Round 4	Cardiff City	4–1	Mold Alexandra	Cardiff
19:45	Robbie Turner 28'; Jeff Hemmerman 43'; Nigel Vaughan 83', 90'		Goal	Stadium: Ninian Park; Attendance: 604; Referee: Colin Jones (Porth)

11 March 1986 Round 5	Cardiff City	0–0	Barry Town	Cardiff
19:45				Stadium: Ninian Park; Attendance: 2,053; Referee: Roger Gifford (Ystrad Mynach)

13 March 1986 Round 5 (Replay)	Barry Town	0–2	Cardiff City	Barry
14:30			Jeff Hemmerman; David Giles	Stadium: Jenner Park; Attendance: 1,750

15 April 1986 Semi Final (First Leg)	Wrexham	4–1	Cardiff City	Wrexham
19:30	Andy Edwards 6', 65'; Barry Horne 81'; Jim Steel 90'	Wrexham report	15' Nigel Vaughan	Stadium: The Racecourse; Attendance: 1,639; Referee: Ron Bridges (Deeside)

22 April 1986 Semi Final (Second Leg)	Cardiff City	1–2 (2–6 agg.)	Wrexham	Cardiff
19:45	Chris Marustik 29'	Wrexham report	25' Jim Steel; 53' Andy Edwards	Stadium: Ninian Park; Attendance: 1,255; Referee: John Deakin (Llantwit Major)

=== Freight Rover Trophy ===
21 January 1986 Round 1 (Group)	Newport County	1–0	Cardiff City	Newport
19:30	Steve Mardenborough			Stadium: Somerton Park; Attendance: 1,863; Referee: E Scales

28 January 1986 Round 1 (Group)	Cardiff City	0–2	Swansea City	Cardiff
19:45			Sean McCarthy; Sean McCarthy	Stadium: Ninian Park; Attendance: 1,006; Referee: Roger Gifford (Ystrad Mynach)

== See also ==
- List of Cardiff City F.C. seasons
