= 1986–87 Cardiff City F.C. season =

Welsh football club season

Cardiff City
1986–87 season
- Chairman: Tony Clemo
- Manager: Frank Burrows
- Football League Fourth Division: 13th
- FA Cup: 4th round
- League Cup: 4th round
- Welsh Cup: 4th round
- Freight Rover Trophy: Preliminary round
- Top goalscorer: League: Paul Wimbleton (8); All: Paul Wimbleton (11)
- Highest home attendance: 11,505 (v Swansea, 26 December 1986)
- Lowest home attendance: 1,510 (v Hartlepool, 7 May 1987)
- Average home league attendance: 3,128

The 1986–87 season was Cardiff City F.C.'s 60th season in the Football League. They competed in the 24-team Division Four, then the fourth tier of English football, finishing fifteenth.

== Players ==
First team squad. Note: Flags indicate national team as defined under FIFA eligibility rules; some limited exceptions apply. Players may hold more than one non-FIFA nationality.

Pos.	Nation	Player
GK	ENG	Graham Moseley
GK	WAL	Mel Rees
DF	WAL	Terry Boyle
DF	ENG	Phil Brignull
DF	ENG	Mike Ford
DF	ENG	Andy Kerr
DF	WAL	Jason Perry
DF	ENG	Nick Platnauer
DF	ENG	Steve Sherlock
MF	WAL	Gareth Davies
MF	WAL	Brian Flynn
MF	WAL	David Giles
MF	WAL	Jason Gummer
MF	ENG	Steve Mardenborough

Pos.	Nation	Player
MF	WAL	Chris Marustik
MF	ENG	Paul McLoughlin
MF	WAL	Tarki Micallef
MF	ENG	Alan Rogers
MF	WAL	Nigel Vaughan
MF	ENG	Paul Wheeler
MF	ENG	Paul Wimbleton
FW	ENG	Kevin Bartlett
FW	WAL	Alan Curtis
FW	ENG	Dean Horrix
FW	WAL	Chris Pike
FW	ENG	Tony Simmons
FW	ENG	Robbie Turner

== League standings ==
Pos	Team	Pld	W	D	L	GF	GA	GD	Pts
11	Cambridge United	46	17	11	18	60	62	−2	62
12	Swansea City	46	17	11	18	56	61	−5	62
13	Cardiff City	46	15	16	15	48	50	−2	61
14	Exeter City	46	11	23	12	53	49	+4	56
15	Halifax Town	46	15	10	21	59	74	−15	55

=== Results by round ===
Round	1	2	3	4	5	6	7	8	9	10	11	12	13	14	15	16	17	18	19	20	21	22	23	24	25	26	27	28	29	30	31	32	33	34	35	36	37	38	39	40	41	42	43	44	45	46
Ground	A	H	A	H	H	A	H	A	H	A	A	H	A	A	H	A	H	H	A	H	A	H	H	A	A	A	H	H	A	A	H	A	H	H	A	H	A	H	H	A	H	A	A	H	H	A
Result	D	D	W	L	D	D	W	W	D	L	L	D	D	W	L	L	W	W	W	D	L	D	L	W	W	L	L	D	W	D	L	L	D	D	W	D	L	D	W	L	W	L	L	D	W	W
Position	~	~	8	12	14	16	10	5	9	12	16	16	15	13	14	18	14	10	9	10	11	12	16	16	13	13	17	16	13	13	14	14	14	14	13	13	13	13	13	14	14	14	14	14	14	13
Points	1	2	5	5	6	7	10	13	14	14	14	15	16	19	19	19	22	25	28	29	29	30	30	33	36	36	36	37	40	41	41	41	42	43	46	47	47	48	51	51	54	54	54	55	58	61

A = Away; H = Home; W = Win; D = Draw; L = Loss

== Fixtures and results ==
=== Fourth Division ===
23 August 1986 1	Hartlepool United	1–1	Cardiff City	Hartlepool
15:00tor	Tony Smith		83' Robbie Turner	Stadium: Victoria Park; Attendance: 2,800

30 August 1986 2	Cardiff City	0–0	Rochdale	Cardiff
15:00				Stadium: Ninian Park; Attendance: 3,546; Referee: Noel Butler (Surrey)

6 September 1986 3	Wolverhampton Wanderers	0–1	Cardiff City	Wolverhampton
15:00			89' Paul Wimbleton	Stadium: Molineux; Attendance: 5,740; Referee: Roger Wiseman (Borehamwood)

13 September 1986 4	Cardiff City	0–2	Tranmere Rovers	Cardiff
15:00			John Morrissey; 45' John Morrissey	Stadium: Ninian Park; Attendance: 2,868

16 September 1986 5	Cardiff City	1–1	Lincoln City	Cardiff
19:45	Alan Rogers		Tony Simmons	Stadium: Ninian Park; Attendance: 2,402

20 September 1986 6	Exeter City	0–0	Cardiff City	Exeter
15:00				Stadium: St James's Park; Attendance: 3,066; Referee: Paul Vanes (Warley)

27 September 1986 7	Cardiff City	4–1	Hereford United	Cardiff
15:00	Paul Wheeler 8'; Nigel Vaughan 27'; Paul Wimbleton 55' (pen.); Alan Curtis 65'		75' John Delve	Stadium: Ninian Park; Attendance: 3,353; Referee: David Vickers

1 October 1986 8	Peterborough United	1–2	Cardiff City	Peterborough
19:30	Les Lawrence 4'		Nigel Vaughan; 65' Paul Wheeler	Attendance: 2,600; Referee: D Shaw

4 October 1986 9	Cardiff City	1–1	Crewe Alexandra	Cardiff
15:00	Nigel Vaughan 42'		60' Geoff Thomas	Stadium: Ninian Park; Attendance: 3,570; Referee: IS Hemley

11 October 1986 10	Wrexham	5–1	Cardiff City	Wrexham
15:00	Jim Steel 6'; Steve Charles 24' (pen.); Barry Horne 41', 49'; Steve Massey 67'	Wrexham report	88' Nigel Vaughan; (red card) 63' Chris Marustik	Stadium: The Racecourse; Attendance: 2,926; Referee: MP Scott

17 October 1986 11	Colchester United	3–1	Cardiff City	Colchester
19:30	John Reeves 18'; Tony English 55'; Simon Burman 81'		83' Paul Wheeler	Stadium: Layer Road; Attendance: 3,169; Referee: Alf Buksh (London)

25 October 1986 12	Cardiff City	1–1	Scunthorpe United	Cardiff
15:00	Terry Boyle 72'		81' Steve Johnson	Stadium: Ninian Park; Attendance: 2,145; Referee: ML James

31 October 1986 13	Halifax Town	1–1	Cardiff City	Halifax
19:30	Phil Brown (pen.)		33' Nick Platnauer	Stadium: The Shay; Attendance: 1,640

4 November 1986 14	Preston North End	0–1	Cardiff City	Preston
19:30			53' Mike Ford	Stadium: Deepdale; Attendance: 6,614

8 November 1986 15	Cardiff City	0–2	Southend United	Cardiff
15:00			15' Roy McDonough; Richard Cadette	Stadium: Ninian Park; Attendance: 3,025; Referee: Ron Groves (Weston)

22 November 1986 16	Stockport County	2–0	Cardiff City	Stockport
15:00	Vernon Allatt 13'; Levi Edwards 86'			Stadium: Edgeley Park; Attendance: 1,674

29 November 1986 17	Cardiff City	3–0	Cambridge United	Cardiff
15:00	Kevin Bartlett 9'; Kevin Bartlett 78'; Paul Wimbleton 25' (pen.)			Stadium: Ninian Park; Attendance: 2,071

13 December 1986 18	Cardiff City	2–0	Aldershot	Cardiff
15:00	Nick Platnauer 9'; Nigel Vaughan 78'			Stadium: Ninian Park; Attendance: 2,443

19 December 1986 19	Burnley	1–3	Cardiff City	Burnley
19:30	Ashley Hoskin 65'		57' Nigel Vaughan; 58' Chris Pike; 79' Paul Wimbleton	Stadium: Turf Moor; Attendance: 1,702; Referee: John Lovatt (Crewe)

26 December 1986 20	Cardiff City	0–0	Swansea Town	Cardiff
11:00				Stadium: Ninian Park; Attendance: 11,505; Referee: Howard King (Merthyr Tydfil)

28 December 1986 21	Northampton Town	4–1	Cardiff City	Northampton
15:00	Ian Benjamin; Dave Gilbert (pen.); Trevor Morley; Richard Hill		Chris Pike	Stadium: County Ground; Attendance: 11,138; Referee: Malcolm Cotton (Camberley, Surrey)

3 January 1987 22	Cardiff City	1–1	Stockport County	Cardiff
15:00	Paul Wheeler 29'		20' Vernon Allatt	Stadium: Ninian Park; Attendance: 3,038

24 January 1987 23	Cardiff City	0–2	Wolverhampton Wanderers	Cardiff
15:00			39' (pen.) Andy Thompson; 42' Steve Bull	Stadium: Ninian Park; Attendance: 3,331; Referee: NJ Ashley (Nantwich)

7 February 1987 24	Lincoln City	0–1	Cardiff City	Lincoln
15:00			48' (pen.) Paul Wimbleton	Stadium: Sincil Bank; Attendance: 1,954; Referee: K Redfern

21 February 1987 25	Hereford United	0–2	Cardiff City	Hereford
			48' (o.g.) Wayne Cegielski; 70' Dean Horrix	Stadium: Edgar Street; Attendance: 3,969

24 February 1987 26	Tranmere Rovers	2–1	Cardiff City	Birkenhead
19:30	Stephen Vickers; Andy Muir		Tony Simmons	Stadium: Prenton Park; Attendance: 1,456; Referee: David Allison (Lancaster)

28 February 1987 27	Cardiff City	0–1	Peterborough United	Cardiff
15:00			83' Noel Luke	Stadium: Ninian Park; Attendance: 2,620; Referee: AW Ward

3 March 1987 28	Cardiff City	0–0	Halifax Town	Cardiff
19:45				Stadium: Ninian Park; Attendance: 1,784; Referee: RL Hamer

7 March 1987 29	Scunthorpe United	1–3	Cardiff City	Scunthorpe
15:00	Brian Smith 22'		19' Andy Kerr; 24', 81' Dean Horrix	Stadium: Old Show Ground; Attendance: 1,935; Referee: Ken Baker (Rugby)

10 March 1987 30	Rochdale	0–0	Cardiff City	Rochdale
19:30				Stadium: Spotland Stadium; Attendance: 1,114; Referee: Colin Seel (Carlisle)

14 March 1987 31	Cardiff City	0–2	Colchester United	Cardiff
15:00			49' Simon Lowe; 51' Simon Lowe	Stadium: Ninian Park; Attendance: 2,222; Referee: Vic Callow (Solihull)

17 March 1987 32	Orient	2–0	Cardiff City	Orient
19:30	Alan Comfort 3'; Alan Comfort 38'			Stadium: Brisbane Road; Attendance: 2,401; Referee: Gerald Ashby (Worcester)

21 March 1987 33	Cardiff City	0–0	Wrexham	Cardiff
15:00		Wrexham report		Stadium: Ninian Park; Attendance: 1,805; Referee: Brian Stevens (Stonehouse)

24 March 1987 34	Cardiff City	1–1	Orient	Cardiff
19:45	Nick Platnauer 89'		3' Andy Sussex	Stadium: Ninian Park; Attendance: 1,562; Referee: Roger Milford (Bristol)

28 March 1987 35	Crewe Alexandra	1–2	Cardiff City	Crewe
15:00	Geoff Thomas 48'		Paul Wheeler; 78' Paul Wheeler	Stadium: Gresty Road; Attendance: 1,762

31 March 1987 36	Cardiff City	0–0	Exeter City	Cardiff
19:45				Stadium: Ninian Park; Attendance: 1,825; Referee: Kevin Breen (Liverpool)

3 April 1987 37	Southend United	2–0	Cardiff City	Southend
19:30	Derek Hall 3'; Richard Cadette 17'			Stadium: Roots Hall; Attendance: 3,917

11 April 1987 38	Cardiff City	1–1	Preston North End	Cardiff
15:00	Paul Wimbleton 90'		John Thomas	Stadium: Ninian Park; Attendance: 2,528

18 April 1987 39	Cardiff City	3–1	Torquay United	Cardiff
15:00	Steve Mardenborough 38'; Alan Curtis 59'; Paul Wheeler 61'		16' Mark Loram	Stadium: Ninian Park; Attendance: 1,840; Referee: Terry Holbrook

20 April 1987 40	Swansea Town	2–0	Cardiff City	Swansea
11:30	Paul Atkinson 26'; Terry Boyle 77' (o.g.)			Stadium: Vetch Field; Attendance: 6,653

25 April 1987 41	Cardiff City	1–0	Burnley	Cardiff
15:00	Paul Wimbleton 64' (pen.)			Stadium: Ninian Park; Attendance: 2,003; Referee: Paul Vanes (West Midlands)

28 April 1987 42	Torquay United	1–0	Cardiff City	Torquay
19:30	Mark Gardiner			Stadium: Plainmoor; Attendance: 1,365; Referee: Bob Hamer

1 May 1987 43	Cambridge United	2–1	Cardiff City	Cambridge
19:45	Mark Schiavi; David Crown		Jason Gummer	Stadium: Abbey Stadium; Attendance: 1,563

4 May 1987 44	Cardiff City	1–1	Northampton Town	Cardiff
15:00	Alan Curtis 47'		Ian Benjamin	Stadium: Ninian Park; Attendance: 2,682; Referee: Malcolm Heath (Stoke)

7 May 1987 45	Cardiff City	4–0	Hartlepool United	Cardiff
15:00	Alan Curtis 20'; Jason Gummer 32'; Kevin Bartlett; Paul Wimbleton 86'			Stadium: Ninian Park; Attendance: 1,510

9 May 1987 46	Aldershot	1–2	Cardiff City	Aldershot
19:45	Bobby Barnes 49'		41' Jason Gummer; Kevin Bartlett	Stadium: Recreation Ground; Attendance: 3,680

=== Littlewoods Cup ===
26 August 1986 Round 1 (First Leg)	Cardiff City	5–4	Plymouth Argyle	Cardiff
19:45	Nigel Vaughan 29', 56'; Terry Boyle 70'; Robbie Turner 54'; Paul Wheeler 83'		4' John Matthews; 18', 38' Russell Coughlin; 44' Kevin Summerfield	Stadium: Ninian Park; Attendance: 2,503; Referee: GR Ashby

2 September 1986 Round 1 (Second Leg)	Plymouth Argyle	0–1 (4–6 agg.)	Cardiff City	Plymouth
19:30			David Giles	Stadium: Home Park; Attendance: 5,829

28 October 1986 Round 3	Cardiff City	2–1	Chelsea	Cardiff
19:45	Nick Platnauer 48'; Nick Platnauer 75'		47' (pen.) Keith Jones	Stadium: Ninian Park; Attendance: 8,018; Referee: Vic Callow (Solihull)

18 November 1986 Round 4	Shrewsbury Town	1–0	Cardiff City	Shrewsbury
19:30	Bernard McNally 87'			Stadium: Gay Meadow; Attendance: 4,634; Referee: Jim Ashworth (Luffenham)

=== FA Cup ===
15 November 1986 Round 1	Ton Pentre	1–4	Cardiff City	Ton Pentre
14:30	Gareth Bees 45'		42', 71' Chris Marustik; 38' Paul Wimbleton; 89' Paul Wheeler	Stadium: Ynys Park; Attendance: 2,700; Referee: Rodger Gifford (Llanbradach)

9 December 1986 Round 2	Cardiff City	2–0	Brentford	Cardiff
19:45	Paul Wimbleton 1'; Kevin Bartlett			Stadium: Ninian Park; Attendance: 2,531; Referee: Paul Vanes (West Midlands)

10 January 1987 Round 3	Millwall	0–0	Cardiff City	Millwall
15:00				Stadium: The Den; Attendance: 5,615; Referee: John Moules (Kent)

20 January 1987 Round 3 (Replay)	Cardiff City	2–2 (a.e.t.)	Millwall	Cardiff
19:45	Nigel Vaughan 33'; Chris Marustik 73'		2' John Leslie; 84' Darren Morgan	Stadium: Ninian Park; Attendance: 4,585; Referee: John Moules (Kent)

26 January 1987 Round 3 (2nd Replay)	Cardiff City	1–0	Millwall	Cardiff
19:45	Chris Pike 47'			Stadium: Ninian Park; Attendance: 5,012; Referee: Ron Groves (Weston)

31 January 1987 Round 4	Stoke City	2–1	Cardiff City	Stoke
15:00	Carl Saunders 33'; Phil Heath 70'		Paul Wimbleton	Stadium: Victoria Ground; Attendance: 20,423; Referee: Keith Hackett (Sheffield)

=== Welsh Cup ===
25 November 1986 Round 3	Cardiff City	4–0	Taff's Well	Cardiff
19:45	Kevin Bartlett 12'; Kevin Bartlett 62'; Paul Wheeler 77'; Terry Boyle 84'			Stadium: Ninian Park; Attendance: 581

3 February 1987 Round 4	Wrexham	1–0	Cardiff City	Wrexham
19:30	Steve Buxton 25'	Wrexham report		Stadium: The Racecourse; Attendance: 1,915; Referee: F Roberts (Prestatyn)

=== Freight Rover Trophy ===
2 December 1986 Round 1 (Group)	Cardiff City	0–1	Wolverhampton Wanderers	Cardiff
19:45			75' Steve Bull	Stadium: Ninian Park; Attendance: 1,201; Referee: Lester Shapter (Paignton)

6 January 1987 Round 1 (Group)	Bournemouth	1–0	Cardiff City	Bournemouth
19:30	Sean O'Driscoll 83'			Stadium: Dean Court; Attendance: 1,482; Referee: Danny Vickers (Essex)

== See also ==
- List of Cardiff City F.C. seasons

== Bibliography ==
- Hayes, Dean (2006). The Who's Who of Cardiff City. Breedon Books. ISBN 1-85983-462-0.
- Crooks, John (1986). Cardiff City Chronology 1920-86. John Crooks. ISBN 0-9511984-0-8.
- Shepherd, Richard (2002). The Definitive Cardiff City F.C. Tony Brown. ISBN 1-899-46817-X.
- Crooks, John (1992). Cardiff City Football Club: Official History of the Bluebirds. Yore Publications. ISBN 0-9513321-8-X.
- Dunk, Peter, ed. (1987). Rothmans Football Yearbook 1987-88. Queen Anne Press. ISBN 0-356-14354-6.
- "Football Club History Database – Cardiff City". Archived from the original on 30 December 2008.
- Welsh Football Data Archive
