= 2005–06 Barnsley F.C. season =

Barnsley
2005–2006 season
- Manager: Andy Ritchie
- Stadium: Oakwell
- League One: 5th (qualified for play-offs)
- Play-offs: Winners
- FA Cup: Third round (eliminated by Walsall)
- League Cup: Second round (eliminated by Burnley)
- Football League Trophy: First round (eliminated by Doncaster Rovers)
- Biggest win: 4–0 vs Oldham Athletic (1 October 2005)

The 2005–06 season was the 97th season in the Football League played by Barnsley F.C., a professional football club based in Barnsley, South Yorkshire, England.

== Season summary ==
Having appointed Andy Ritchie as manager after a successful spell as caretaker manager, the Reds started the season in mixed form, picking up 14 points in their first 11 games. A run of 10 games unbeaten followed, as Barnsley found themselves in 4th place and 3 points off the promotion places. Barnsley continued their strong form into the second half of the season, finishing fifth in the league, on 72 points. This meant Barnsley would face Yorkshire rivals Huddersfield Town in a play-off semi-final.

After losing the first leg at home 1–0 it appeared that Barnsley were resigned to another season in League One. However, Barnsley took the lead in the away leg, with Paul Hayes scoring a penalty after being fouled by Danny Schofield. Huddersfield went on to equalise but goals from captain Paul Reid and a 77th-minute winner from Daniel Nardiello meant Barnsley would be playing in the play-off final against Swansea City who had beaten third placed Brentford. This was also the first time in the history of the playoffs in all three divisions that a side had overturned a first leg deficit after losing the first leg at home.

The final was played at the Millennium Stadium, Cardiff on 27 May 2006 in front of a crowd of 55,419. Barnsley took the lead through a Paul Hayes opener but Swansea replied with goals from ex-Red Rory Fallon and Andy Robinson following a blunder by keeper Nick Colgan. A Barnsley equaliser came from a Daniel Nardiello free kick, but neither team could find a winner in either normal time or extra time, despite Swansea's Lee Trundle coming close late on.

As the match was tied 2–2, it was decided on penalties, with Nick Colgan redeeming himself for his earlier mistake and saving Swansea's final penalty from Alan Tate, to give the Reds a 4–3 shootout victory and a place in the Championship.

== Competitions ==
=== League One ===
==== Table ====
Pos	Team	Pld	W	D	L	GF	GA	GD	Pts	Qualification or relegation
3	Brentford	46	20	16	10	72	52	+20	76	Qualification for the League One play-offs
4	Huddersfield Town	46	19	16	11	72	59	+13	73	Qualification for the League One play-offs
5	Barnsley (O, P)	46	18	18	10	62	44	+18	72	Qualification for the League One play-offs
6	Swansea City	46	18	17	11	78	55	+23	71	Qualification for the League One play-offs
7	Nottingham Forest	46	19	12	15	67	52	+15	69	

Rules for classification: 1) Points; 2) Goal difference; 3) Goals scored
(O) Play-off winners; (P) Promoted

==== Match details ====
League One match details
Date	Opponents	Venue	Result	Score F–A	Scorers	Attendance	Ref.
6 August 2005	Swindon Town	H	W	2–0	Hayes 11', Shuker 47'	9,358	
9 August 2005	Scunthorpe United	A	L	1–2	Hayes 16'	7,152	
13 August 2005	Colchester United	A	L	0–1		2,721	
20 August 2005	Yeovil Town	H	W	1–0	Williams 79' (pen.)	8,153	
27 August 2005	Brentford	H	D	1–1	Turner 24' (o.g.)	7,462	
29 August 2005	Swansea City	A	L	1–3	Burns 35'	12,554	
10 September 2005	Nottingham Forest	H	W	2–0	Conlon 41', Shuker 45'	10,080	
13 September 2005	Gillingham	A	W	3–0	Shuker 40', Hayes 43', Nardiello 85'	5,283	
17 September 2005	Milton Keynes Dons	A	D	0–0		4,620	
24 September 2005	Doncaster Rovers	H	L	0–2		12,002	
27 September 2005	Bristol City	A	L	0–3		10,771	
1 October 2005	Oldham Athletic	H	W	4–0	Nardiello 8', Devaney 12', Shuker 14', 54'	8,077	
15 October 2005	Blackpool	H	D	2–2	Richards 81', Howard 84'	7,945	
22 October 2005	Southend United	A	D	1–1	Richards 61'	6,986	
25 October 2005	Rotherham United	A	W	1–0	Devaney 73'	5,401	
29 October 2005	Walsall	H	W	2–1	Hayes 13', Howard 66'	8,145	
12 November 2005	Bradford City	A	D	0–0		9,486	
19 November 2005	Rotherham United	H	D	1–1	Watt 90'	9,894	
26 November 2005	Swindon Town	A	W	3–0	Devaney 8', Shuker 51', 69'	5,422	
6 December 2005	Tranmere Rovers	H	W	2–1	Devaney 58', Richards 77' (pen.)	6,996	
10 December 2005	Scunthorpe United	H	W	5–2	Devaney 2', Hassell 7', Richards 33', Shuker 71', Hayes 90'	8,197	
17 December 2005	Yeovil Town	A	L	1–2	Williams 15'	5,620	
26 December 2005	Hartlepool United	H	D	1–1	Richards 28' (pen.)	9,715	
31 December 2005	Huddersfield Town	H	D	2–2	Burns 42', Nardiello 81'	13,063	
2 January 2006	Chesterfield	A	D	0–0		6,046	
10 January 2006	Gillingham	H	W	1–0	Shuker 15'	7,090	
14 January 2006	Port Vale	A	L	2–3	Burns 56', Carbon 67'	4,468	
21 January 2006	Milton Keynes Dons	H	W	2–0	Richards 77', Hassell 79'	7,588	
27 January 2006	Nottingham Forest	A	W	2–0	Richards 15', 31'	16,237	
4 February 2006	Bristol City	H	W	2–0	Richards 27', 81' (pen.)	8,092	
11 February 2006	Doncaster Rovers	A	L	0–2		8,144	
14 February 2006	Port Vale	H	D	1–1	Hayes 56'	7,709	
18 February 2006	Tranmere Rovers	A	W	1–0	Heckingbottom 16'	6,802	
25 February 2006	Colchester United	H	W	1–0	Howard 72'	9,411	
28 February 2006	Bournemouth	A	D	1–1	McPhail 21'	5,191	
4 March 2006	Swansea City	H	D	2–2	Nardiello 56', Richards 61' (pen.)	9,743	
11 March 2006	Brentford	A	L	1–3	Wright 68'	7,352	
18 March 2006	Hartlepool United	A	D	1–1	Kay 36'	5,122	
25 March 2006	Bournemouth	H	D	0–0		9,180	
1 April 2006	Huddersfield Town	A	L	0–1		19,052	
8 April 2006	Chesterfield	H	D	1–1	Howard 31'	8,303	
15 April 2006	Oldham Athletic	A	W	3–0	Shuker 49', McPhail 62', Devaney 79'	7,772	
17 April 2006	Southend United	H	D	2–2	Hunt 18' (o.g.), Maher 45' (o.g.)	10,663	
22 April 2006	Blackpool	A	D	1–1	Howard 53'	6,912	
29 April 2006	Bradford City	H	D	0–0		11,178	
6 May 2006	Walsall	A	W	2–1	Richards 31', Nardiello 83' (pen.)	7,195	

===== Play-offs =====
League One play-offs match details
Round	Date	Opponents	Venue	Result	Score F–A	Scorers	Attendance	Ref.
Semi-final first leg	11 May 2006	Huddersfield Town	H	L	0–1		16,127	
Semi-final second leg	15 May 2006	Huddersfield Town	A	W	3–1	Hayes 58' (pen.), Reid 71', Nardiello 78'	19,223	
final	27 May 2006	Swansea City	N	D	2–2 (a.e.t.); 4–3 pens.	Hayes 19', Nardiello 62'	55,419	

=== FA Cup ===
FA Cup match details
Round	Date	Opponents	Venue	Result	Score F–A	Scorers	Attendance	Ref.
First round	5 November 2005	Darlington	H	W	1–0	Hayes 5'	6,059	
Second round	3 December 2005	Bradford City	H	D	1–1	Hayes 43'	7,051	
Second round replay	13 December 2005	Bradford City	A	W	5–3 (a.e.t.)	Hayes 51', 78', Reid 59', Devaney 96', 109'	4,738	
Third round	7 January 2006	Walsall	H	D	1–1	Hayes 77'	6,884	
Third round replay	17 January 2006	Walsall	A	L	0–2		4,074	

=== League Cup ===
League Cup match details
Round	Date	Opponents	Venue	Result	Score F–A	Scorers	Attendance	Ref.
First round	23 August 2005	Preston North End	A	D	2–2 (a.e.t.); 5–4 pens.	Burns 81', 108'	3,137	
Second round	20 September 2005	Burnley	A	L	0–3		4,501	

=== Football League Trophy ===
Football League Trophy match details
Round	Date	Opponents	Venue	Result	Score F–A	Scorers	Attendance	Ref.
First round – northern section	18 October 2005	Doncaster Rovers	H	L	2–5	Foster 6' (o.g.), Nardiello 90'	4,095	

== Players ==
No.	Name	Date of birth	Signed from	Nat	Place of birth	Note
Goalkeepers
1	Nick Colgan	19 September 1973	Hibernian	(Republic of Ireland)	Drogheda	
22	Scott Flinders	12 June 1986	none	(England)	Rotherham	
30	David Scarsella	12 October 1982		(Australia)	Adelaide	On loan at Tooting & Mitcham United
Defenders
2	Bobby Hassell	4 June 1980	Mansfield Town	(England)	Derby	
3	Steven Watt	1 May 1985	Chelsea	(Scotland)	Aberdeen	On loan from Chelsea
3	Paul Heckingbottom	17 July 1977	Sheffield Wednesday	(England)	Barnsley	Signed from Sheffield Wednesday
4	Paul Reid	18 February 1982	Northampton Town	(England)	Carlisle	
5	Matt Carbon	8 June 1975	Walsall	(England)	Nottingham	
6	Tony Vaughan	11 October 1975	Mansfield Town	(England)	Manchester	On loan at Stockport County
14	Neil Austin	26 April 1983	none	(England)	Barnsley	
15	Antony Kay	21 October 1982	none	(England)	Barnsley	
20	Robbie Williams	2 October 1984	none	(England)	Pontefract	
31	Rob Atkinson	29 April 1987	none	(England)	Barnsley	
32	Ryan Laight	16 November 1985	none	(England)	Barnsley	
33	Thomas Harban	12 November 1985	none	(England)	Barnsley	
Midfielders
7	Jacob Burns	21 April 1978	Leeds United	(Australia)	Sydney	Signed for Wisla Krakow
10	Stephen McPhail	9 December 1979	Leeds United	(Republic of Ireland)	Westminster	
11	Brian Howard	23 January 1983	Swindon Town	(England)	Winchester	
12	Anthony McParland	20 September 1982	Celtic	(Scotland)	Rutherglen	
16	Richard Kell	15 September 1979	Scunthorpe United	(England)	Bishop Auckland	
17	Nicky Wroe	28 September 1985	none	(England)	Sheffield	
19	Dale Tonge	7 May 1985	none	(England)	Barnsley	
25	Martin Devaney	1 June 1980	Watford	(England)	Cheltenham	
26	Simon Heslop	1 May 1987	none	(England)	York	
34	Kyle Nix	21 January 1986	Sheffield United	(England)	Sydney	On loan from Sheffield United
Forwards
8	Paul Hayes	20 September 1983	Scunthorpe United	(England)	Dagenham	
9	Barry Conlon	1 October 1978	Darlington	(Republic of Ireland)	Drogheda	
18	Chris Shuker	9 May 1982	Manchester City	(England)	Huyton	
21	Marc Richards	8 July 1982	Northampton Town	(England)	Wolverhampton	
23	Daniel Nardiello	22 October 1982	Manchester United	(Wales)	Coventry	
27	Nathan Jarman	19 September 1986	none	(England)	Scunthorpe	
28	Nathan Joynes	7 August 1985	none	(England)	Barnsley	
29	Tommy Wright	28 September 1984	Leicester City	(England)	Kirby Muxloe	
