= Nardiello =

Nardiello is a surname. Notable people with the surname include:

- Daniel Nardiello (born 1982), Welsh footballer
- Donato Nardiello (born 1957), Welsh footballer, father of Daniel and brother of Gerry
- Gerry Nardiello (born 1966), English footballer
- Vincenzo Nardiello (born 1966), Italian boxer
