= Laight =

Laight is a surname. Notable people with the surname include:

- Barry Laight (1920–2012), British aerospace engineer
- Kristian Laight (born 1980), British boxer
- Lily Laight (born 2001), English actress, singer and dancer
- Ryan Laight (born 1985), British football player
