= Les Hunter =

Les Hunter is the name of:

== People ==
- Les Hunter (basketball) (1942–2020), American basketball player
- Les Hunter (footballer) (born 1958), English footballer
- Les Hunter (politician) (1927–2012), New Zealand politician

== Fictional characters ==
- Les Hunter (Hollyoaks), TV soap character

== See also ==
- Leslie Hunter (1877–1931), Scottish painter
- Leslie Hunter (bishop) (1890–1983), Bishop of Sheffield
