= David Moyes =

Scottish football manager and player (born 1963)

David Moyes OBE
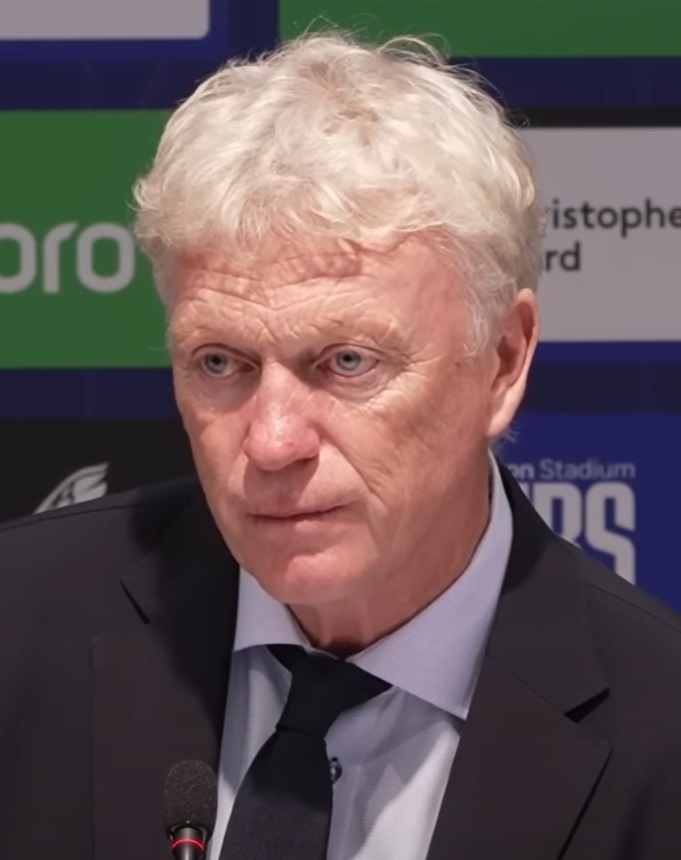
- Moyes in 2025

Personal information
- Full name: David William Moyes
- Date of birth: 25 April 1963 (age 63)
- Place of birth: Glasgow, Scotland
- Height: 6 ft 1 in (1.85 m)
- Position: Centre-back

Team information
- Current team: Everton (manager)

Youth career
- 1978: ÍBV
- 1978–1980: Drumchapel Amateurs

Senior career*
Years	Team	Apps	(Gls)
1980–1983	Celtic	24	(0)
1983–1985	Cambridge United	79	(1)
1985–1987	Bristol City	83	(3)
1987–1990	Shrewsbury Town	96	(11)
1990–1993	Dunfermline Athletic	105	(13)
1993	Hamilton Academical	5	(0)
1993–1998	Preston North End	143	(15)
Total		535	(43)

International career
1980	Scotland U18		

Managerial career
- 1998–2002: Preston North End
- 2002–2013: Everton
- 2013–2014: Manchester United
- 2014–2015: Real Sociedad
- 2016–2017: Sunderland
- 2017–2018: West Ham United
- 2019–2024: West Ham United
- 2025–: Everton
- * Club domestic league appearances and goals

David William Moyes (born 25 April 1963) is a Scottish professional football manager and former player who is the manager of Premier League club Everton. He was the 2003, 2005 and 2009 League Managers Association Manager of the Year.

Moyes made over 540 league appearances as a centre-back in a playing career that began with Celtic, where he won a championship medal. He then played for Cambridge United, Bristol City, Shrewsbury Town, and Dunfermline Athletic, ending his playing career with Preston North End. He became a coach at Preston, working his way up before taking over as manager in 1998, his first managerial position. Moyes led Preston to the Division Two title in 1999–2000 and the Division One play-off final the following season.

Moyes became manager of Everton in 2002. The club managed a fourth-place finish in the league in 2004–05, their highest since 1988, and played in the qualifying rounds for the UEFA Champions League the following season, the first time since 1970–71. Moyes led Everton to a runners-up finish in the 2008–09 FA Cup, their best performance in the competition since winning in 1995. Everton consistently finished between fifth and eighth in the league under Moyes, and at the time of his departure, was the longest-serving manager in the league behind Sir Alex Ferguson and Arsène Wenger, at 11 years and 3 months.

Moyes succeeded Ferguson as manager of Manchester United in June 2013, but with the club 7th in the league in April 2014 and unable to qualify for European competition, he was dismissed. Moyes was appointed head coach of Spanish club Real Sociedad in November 2014, but was dismissed after a year in charge. In 2016, he replaced Sam Allardyce as manager of Sunderland, but resigned at the end of the 2016–17 season after the club was relegated to the EFL Championship.

Moyes was appointed manager of West Ham in November 2017 and led the club out of the relegation zone to a 13th-place finish, but left at the end of the season when his contract was not renewed. He was appointed at West Ham for a second time in December 2019, following the dismissal of Manuel Pellegrini. During his second stint, West Ham achieved two consecutive top-seven finishes in the Premier League, before victory in the 2022–23 UEFA Europa Conference League, defeating Fiorentina in the final to achieve the club's first major silverware in 43 years. Moyes left West Ham in 2024, and returned to Everton the following year.

== Playing career ==
=== Club career ===
Moyes started his career at Icelandic club ÍBV, playing half a season with the youth team in 1978. Moyes enjoyed a career that encompassed playing at a number of clubs, usually as a centre-back, beginning at Celtic, where he won a championship medal and made 24 league appearances, and ending with Preston North End.

As a player with Cambridge United, Moyes received abuse from teammate Roy McDonough for his religious beliefs; Moyes is a practising Christian. McDonough felt that religion was distracting them from focusing on playing; speaking of Moyes, Alan Comfort and Graham Daniels, he said: "The three of them sat in the changing room with a little black book, discussing their faith, when they should have been getting psyched up for a relegation scrap." Following a 3–3 draw with Wigan Athletic on 9 March 1985, McDonough, who was 26 years old at the time, states that he "battered" Moyes for not putting sufficient effort into the game.

While playing for Shrewsbury Town in 1987, Moyes began coaching at the nearby private school, Concord College, on the recommendation of Jake King as a way to supplement his wages. Moyes later made over one hundred appearances for Dunfermline Athletic between 1990 and 1993, including a starting appearance in the 1991 Scottish League Cup final.

Moyes made over 530 league appearances in his career before becoming a coach at Preston, working his way up to assistant manager before eventually taking over as manager in 1998.

=== International career ===
Moyes captained Scotland at under-18 age group level. He played under former UEFA Technical Director Andy Roxburgh in 1980.

== Managerial career ==
=== Preston North End ===
Moyes took over as Preston North End manager in January 1998, replacing Gary Peters as the club struggled in Division Two and were in danger of relegation. He had spent much of his playing career preparing for management, taking coaching badges at just 22 years of age and compiling notes on managers he had played under, their techniques and tactics. Preston avoided relegation at the end of the 1997–98 season and reached the Division Two play-offs the following season, where they were beaten by Gillingham at the semi-final stage.

The following season, Moyes guided Preston to the Division Two title and a promotion to Division One. An even greater achievement perhaps was to steer Preston into the Division One play-offs the season after that, with largely the same squad. Preston lost 3–0 to Bolton Wanderers in the 2001 Football League First Division play-off final, missing out on promotion to the Premier League. One month later, Moyes signed a new five-year contract with the club. In 2001, whilst studying for his UEFA Pro License, Moyes shadowed Roy Hodgson at Udinese during Hodgson's six month spell at the club. Towards the end of the following season, he left for Everton, to take over from fellow Scotsman Walter Smith in March 2002. Moyes took charge of Preston for 234 matches, of which his team won 113, drew 58 and lost 63.

=== Everton ===
==== 2002–2004 ====
Moyes joined Everton on 14 March 2002 and at his unveiling press conference, declared that Everton were 'The People's Club' on Merseyside. He said:

I am from a city (Glasgow) that is not unlike Liverpool. I am joining the people's football club. The majority of people you meet on the street are Everton fans. It is a fantastic opportunity, something you dream about. I said 'yes' right away as it is such a big club.

His first game in charge was two days later, against Fulham at Goodison Park. Everton won the game 2–1, with David Unsworth scoring after just 30 seconds.

Everton managed to sustain a good run of form and avoided relegation, which was a genuine threat when he was originally appointed. Despite having a history and list of honours only surpassed in English football by Liverpool, Arsenal and Manchester United, the past decade had not been a successful time for the Toffees, with an FA Cup win in 1995 and a sixth-place finish in 1996 being the only bright spots for the club post-1990.

Moyes prepared for his first full season in charge at Everton by signing Chinese international Li Tie, Nigerian defender Joseph Yobo and goalkeeper Richard Wright and released older players such as Jesper Blomqvist and David Ginola. On 12 April 2003, Moyes was sent to the stands during a game against West Bromwich Albion by referee Steve Bennett for using foul and abusive language and for improper behaviour. Everton were edged out of qualification for the following season's UEFA Cup on the last day of the season by Blackburn Rovers, following a defeat by Manchester United, and finished seventh in the league. Moyes was awarded LMA Manager of the Year for the first time, to go with the Premier League Manager of the Month award for November 2002, when the Toffees had been in the Champions League places.

For the 2003–04 season, Moyes signed Kevin Kilbane from Sunderland, James McFadden from Motherwell, Nigel Martyn from Leeds United and Francis Jeffers returned on loan from Arsenal. Poor results followed though and Everton did not win a game in 2004 until 28 February. A confrontation between Moyes and Duncan Ferguson at Everton's training ground was said to be symptomatic of the problems at the club. Everton finished 17th with 39 points, the lowest total in the club's history until 2022–23, (although survival had been confirmed some time earlier), just avoiding relegation.

==== 2004–2009 ====
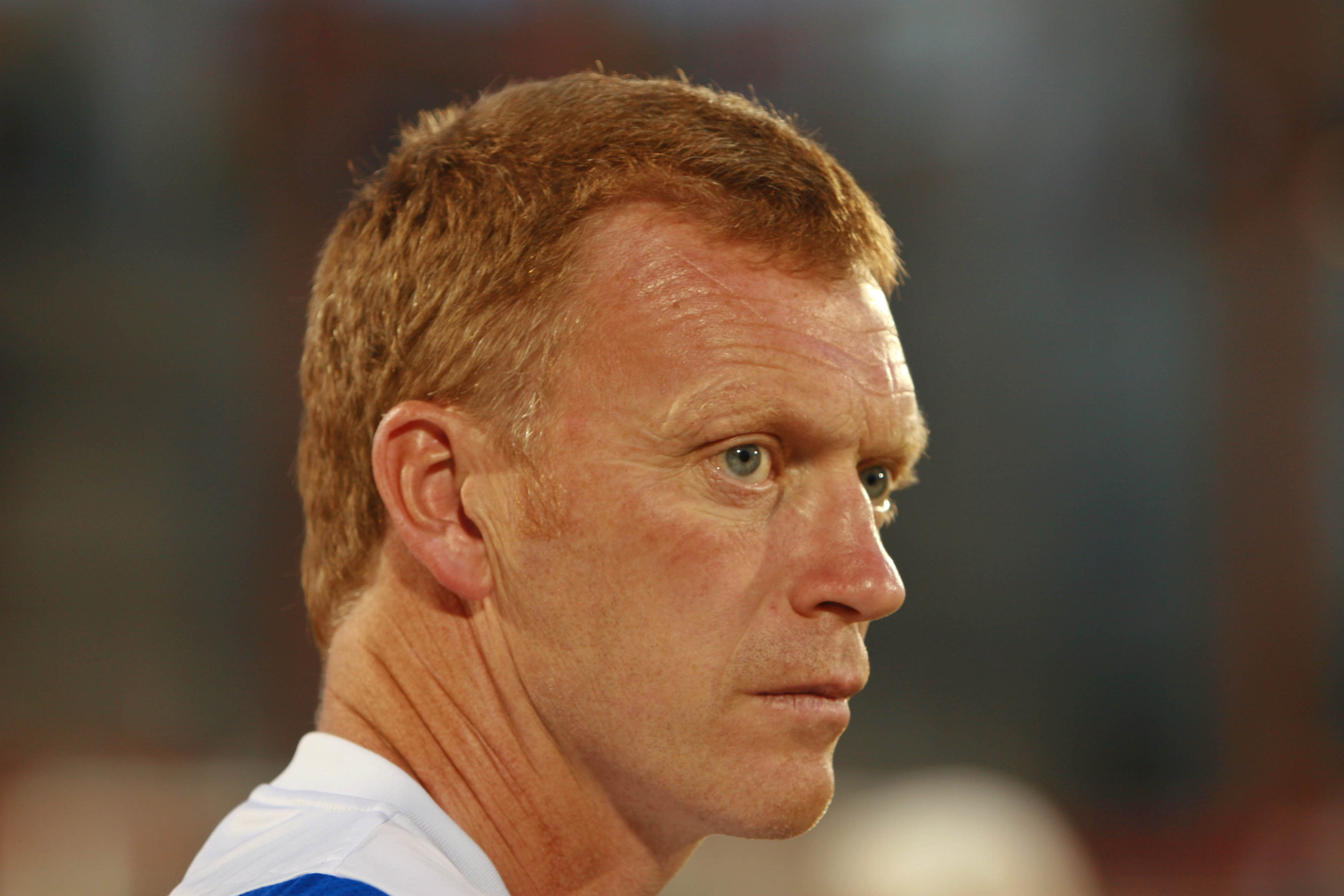
Moyes in 2006

During the summer of 2004, despite the turmoil surrounding the club's recent form, Moyes managed to bring in Tim Cahill and Marcus Bent. To this day, Cahill is considered to be one of Moyes' best signings, scoring 15 goals in his first season playing for Everton. Those who left the club were Tomasz Radzinski, Tobias Linderoth, David Unsworth and, most significantly Wayne Rooney, who joined Manchester United for a reported £25.6 million. Later, the Daily Mail published extracts from Rooney's autobiography, claiming that Moyes had forced Rooney out of the club and then leaked the details to the press. Moyes went on to sue for libel before settling out of court when Rooney apologised and agreed to pay for damages. Moyes donated the undisclosed damages from the suit to the Everton Former Players' Foundation.

During the 2004–05 season, Everton went on to surpass all expectations by finishing fourth in the league and securing a place in the following season's third qualification round for the UEFA Champions League, Moyes again being awarded the LMA Manager of the Year award. Moyes then broke Everton's transfer record to bring in striker James Beattie in January and, as influential midfielder Thomas Gravesen left, Mikel Arteta came in on loan.

At the beginning of the 2005–06 season, Everton struggled again and were battling relegation. Their bid to play in the Champions League ended with a loss to Villarreal in the qualifying round, and the club were defeated 5–1 at FC Dinamo București in the first round of the UEFA Cup. Moyes signed Nuno Valente, Andy van der Meyde, Simon Davies, Per Krøldrup, and Phil Neville; signed Matteo Ferrari on loan; and made Arteta a permanent signing. They climbed from bottom place in late October to a secure 11th-place finish at the end of the season.

Moyes broke the club transfer record for a second time at the start of the 2006–07 season with the £8.6 million acquisition of Andrew Johnson. Joleon Lescott was also signed from Wolverhampton Wanderers while goalkeeper Tim Howard arrived from Manchester United on a loan deal, which was later made permanent. All of these players would prove to be successful signings, further enhancing Moyes' reputation as a team builder. Whilst Everton's league form flourished again, their record in the FA Cup under Moyes did not improve: in the third round they crashed out 4–1 to Blackburn Rovers. An improved league position of sixth was secured along with UEFA Cup football for the next season.

It was the 2007–08 season that Everton displayed the most consistency and stability since Moyes arrived at the club, finally ending the cycle of alternating between the top and bottom halves of the league. In his sixth full season in charge, Moyes secured fifth place in the league and reached the semi-final of the Football League Cup as well as the last 16 of the UEFA Cup, eventually being beaten on penalties by Fiorentina. Moyes also signed four more players who went on to become very important players for Everton: Yakubu was signed for another record fee of £11.25 million, Steven Pienaar for £2.05 million after an initial loan, Phil Jagielka was brought in for £4 million, and Leighton Baines was signed for a fee that could rise to £6 million. All of this gave Everton and its fans cause for optimism as a string of strong performances broke the pattern inconsistency which saw league finishes of 15th, 7th, 17th, 4th and 11th under Moyes. His reputation as a disciplinarian could be seen to manifest in Everton's yellow card count. They received just 27 yellow cards all season – the lowest in the league and six fewer than their nearest rival Liverpool.

Moyes recruited Steve Round as his assistant manager for the 2008–09 season to replace Alan Irvine, who had taken over as Preston North End manager the previous winter. Everton's first new player of the season, Lars Jacobsen, was brought in two games into the season. This was shortly followed by the signings of Segundo Castillo and Louis Saha. On deadline day, Moyes secured the services of goalkeeper Carlo Nash on a free transfer, and Marouane Fellaini for a club record £15 million. On 14 September, Moyes was sent to the stands by referee Alan Wiley during a game against Stoke City. He was later fined £5,000 by The Football Association for improper conduct and warned about his future behaviour.

At the end of the transfer window January 2009, Moyes brought in Brazilian international striker Jô on loan from Manchester City. On 14 October 2008, Moyes agreed to extend his Goodison Park stay by a further five years. On 19 April 2009, Moyes led his team to an FA Cup semi-final victory over Manchester United, after a penalty shoot-out, to reach the final for the first time since 1995. In what would be Everton's only appearance in a final during Moyes' time at the club, Everton were beaten 2–1 by Chelsea despite taking a lead through Louis Saha in the opening minute.

==== 2009–2013 ====
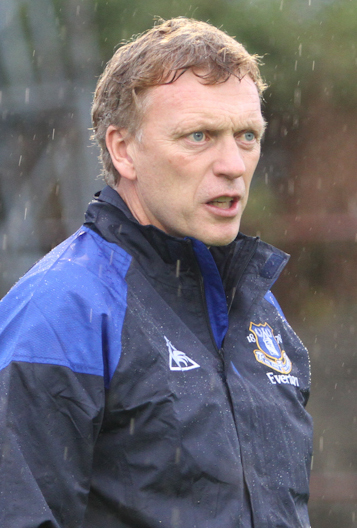
Moyes managing Everton in 2011

In the summer of 2009, Moyes sold Joleon Lescott to Manchester City for £22 million, after a saga that lasted for the entire transfer window. With the money from the Lescott sale, Moyes brought in Johnny Heitinga, Sylvain Distin and Diniyar Bilyaletdinov. He also re-signed Jô on a season-long loan and Lucas Neill on a free transfer. Moyes was named as Premier League Manager of the Month for January 2010 after three wins and a draw. Moyes took charge of his 600th match as a manager on 6 February 2010 in the Merseyside Derby against Liverpool which resulted in a 1–0 defeat. Everton ended the season in eighth place, failing to qualify for Europe for the first time in four years despite a run of only two defeats in their last 24 league games.

On 14 May 2010, Moyes revealed he would be interested in taking up the Celtic job in the future; that job did indeed become vacant at the end of the 2009–10 season with the departure of Tony Mowbray, but Moyes did not put his name forward for the vacancy and Neil Lennon was appointed instead. In August 2010, Moyes dismissed speculation linking him with the manager's job at Aston Villa left vacant by the resignation of Martin O'Neill.

In September 2010, Moyes admitted an improper conduct charge in relation to his behaviour towards referee Martin Atkinson following a 3–3 draw with Manchester United. He was fined £8,000 with his assistant Steve Round also admitting to the same charge. In January 2012, Moyes became the fourth manager, after Alex Ferguson, Arsène Wenger and Harry Redknapp, to record 150 wins in the Premier League. He celebrated his 400th Premier League game in November 2012 with a 2–1 win against Sunderland.

Upon reaching his 10th anniversary at the club Moyes received praise from many fellow managers including Sir Alex Ferguson, Arsène Wenger and Kenny Dalglish for his achievements at Everton. His service to Everton was also praised in Parliament by Steve Rotheram MP.

On 9 May 2013, following Ferguson's retirement at Manchester United and with his own contract expiring at the end of the season, Moyes informed Everton that he would leave the club to succeed Ferguson. Three days after being named as Ferguson's successor at Manchester United, Moyes took charge of his last game with Everton at Goodison. He received a guard of honour by his own players prior to the post-match lap of appreciation, and Everton fans held banners with messages such as "Goodbye and Good luck", and "Thanks for the memories". On his reception, Moyes stated, "It was really emotional. All the stewards were standing clapping me when I came in and I didn't know what to do. I am gobsmacked and thankful and humbled for what the people of Everton have shown me today".

Some fans at Everton dubbed Moyes "Dithering Dave", criticising what they saw as indecisive management, particularly regarding transfers. Another criticism of his eleven years at Everton was his away record against the "Big Four" (the four best Premier League teams of the last decade), Manchester United, Chelsea, Arsenal and Liverpool. In 43 matches at Old Trafford, Stamford Bridge, Highbury/Emirates Stadium and Anfield, his Everton team failed to win a single game.

=== Manchester United ===
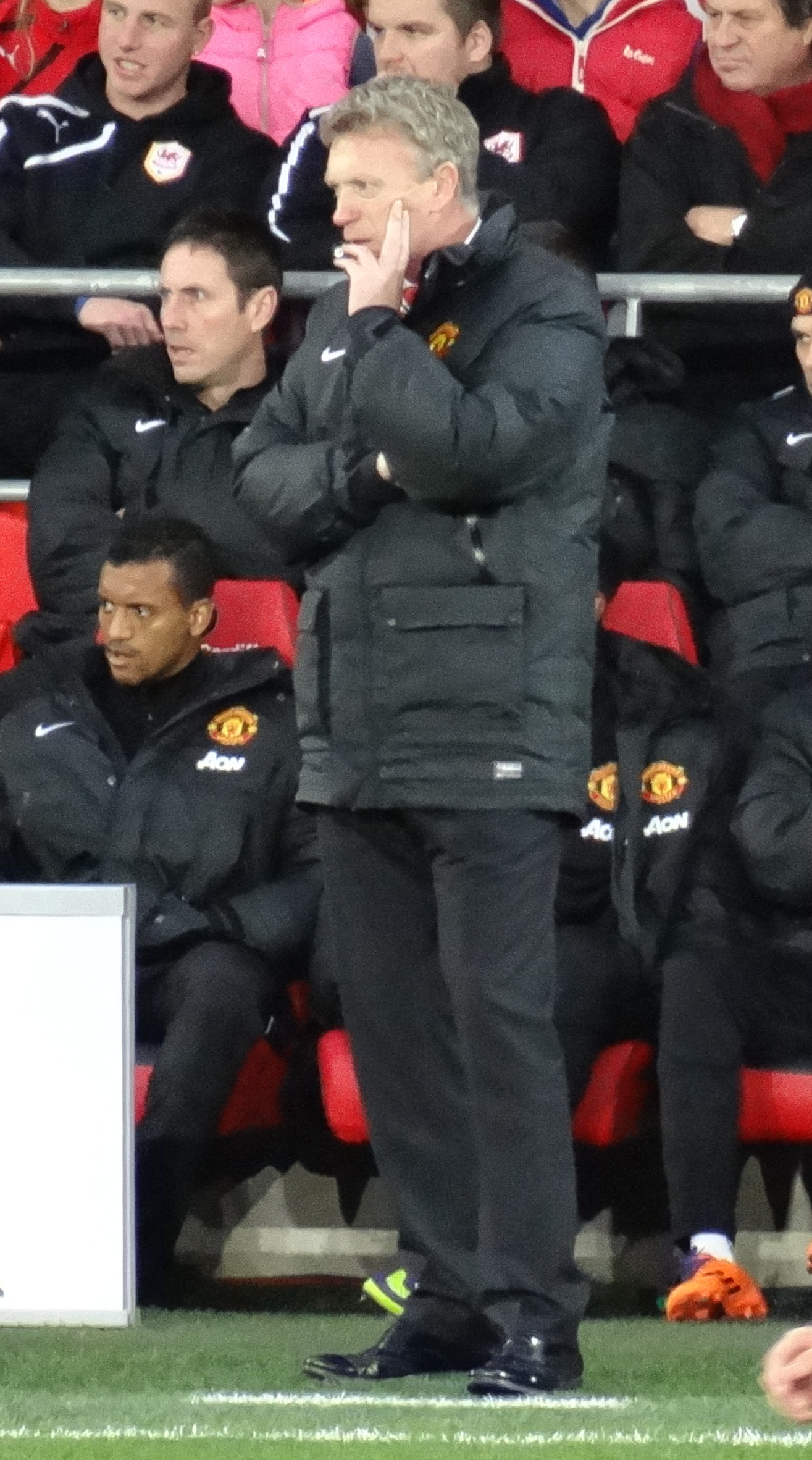
Moyes replaced Sir Alex Ferguson as manager of Manchester United in 2013

Moyes signed a six-year contract with Manchester United, and officially took up his managerial position on 1 July 2013. Moyes had been hand-picked as manager by Sir Alex Ferguson and after his appointment a banner reading "The Chosen One" was displayed at Old Trafford. His first unofficial game as United manager ended in defeat as Teeratep Winothai scored the only goal for Singha All Stars in Bangkok on 13 July 2013. On 11 August 2013, he won his only trophy with Manchester United in his first official game, a 2–0 win over Wigan Athletic in the FA Community Shield. It meant he became the first United manager in history to win a trophy outright in his first season in charge. Less than a week later, he won his first league game in charge of the club, opening the season with a 4–1 victory against Swansea City, but after that, United suffered their worst ever start to a Premier League season, leading the start of his reign to be described as "calamitous" following a 1–0 defeat at Liverpool, a 4–1 defeat at Manchester City and a 2–1 home defeat by West Bromwich Albion (United's first defeat to West Brom at home since 1978), with several journalists stating the pressure was now on despite it being early in his reign. On 2 September 2013, Moyes signed Marouane Fellaini on a four-year contract, with the option of extension of another season, reuniting with his former player in a £27.5 million deadline day deal.

In December, Manchester United lost Premier League matches at home to Everton and Newcastle United in the space of four days (United's first defeat at home to Everton in 21 years, and first at home to Newcastle in 41 years), suffering back-to-back league defeats at Old Trafford for the first time since the 2001–02 season. United were ninth in the table after 15 games, 13 points behind leaders Arsenal. Moyes said that he took "complete responsibility" for United's defeats but said he was confident his team would improve. Moyes did however have a positive start to his first Champions League campaign with the club. United finished top of their group after winning four of their six group stage matches.

In January 2014, United were knocked out of the FA Cup in the third round by Swansea City, losing 2–1 at home (Swansea's first ever win at Old Trafford), and lost in the semi-final of the Football League Cup, with Sunderland winning a penalty shoot-out. In February, United lost 2–1 at Stoke (Stoke's first win over United in 30 years). Following consecutive 0–3 home defeats against Liverpool and Manchester City, a flypast was staged by United fans with the banner displaying "Wrong One – Moyes Out" in seven-foot high lettering during a home match against Aston Villa in March. After the match, which United won 4–1, Moyes said the majority of fans had been "very supportive" of him. The club reached the quarter-final stage of the Champions League, after beating Olympiacos, but were defeated 4–2 on aggregate by Bayern Munich.

On 20 April 2014, United lost 2–0 at Everton (the first time Everton had defeated United home and away in 44 years). Two days later, United announced that they had dismissed Moyes. Moyes was in charge of United for 10 months, the third-shortest managerial stint in United history and the shortest in 82 years, despite calls from several respected ex-Manchester United players such as Denis Law and David Beckham calling for Moyes to be given more time at the club. At the time of his sacking, United were seventh in the Premier League table, 13 points behind fourth-placed Arsenal with four matches remaining, ensuring United would fail to qualify for the Champions League for the first time since 1995 and finish outside of the top three for the first time in Premier League history. Moyes had won 5 points from a possible 24 against Liverpool, Chelsea, Manchester City, and Arsenal (the top four at the time of his dismissal). He was replaced in the interim by long-serving player Ryan Giggs and permanently by Louis van Gaal. Moyes was awarded £5 million in compensation following the dismissal.

Moyes was critiqued for his perceived defeatist attitude while at United. He had referred to their rivals Liverpool as the "favourites" ahead of their trip to Old Trafford (Liverpool manager Brendan Rodgers responded "I would never say that at Liverpool – even if I was bottom of the league"), and on Man United, the defending champions, Moyes stated their city rivals Manchester City were "at the sort of level we are aspiring to". Calling the appointment of Moyes Ferguson's second biggest mistake as Man United manager, the Manchester Evening News stated, "Moyes never sounded or managed like a United manager. United got an Everton manager, Everton coaches, an Everton player and achieved an Everton finish; seventh".

=== Real Sociedad ===
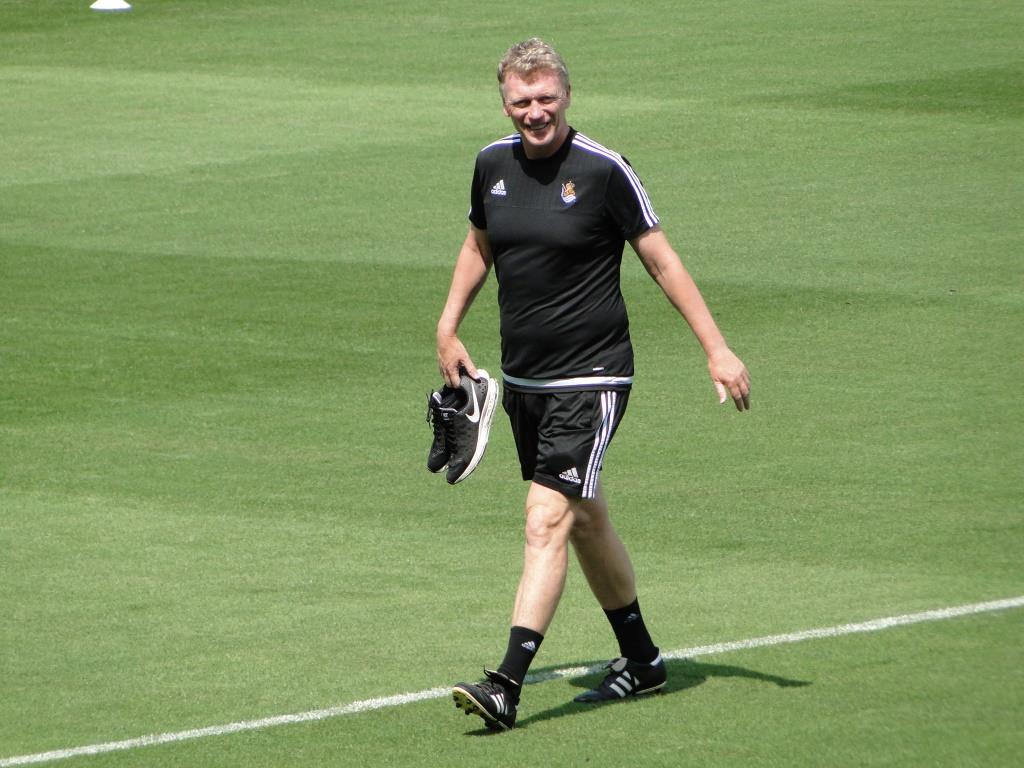
Moyes as manager of Real Sociedad in 2015

On 10 November 2014, Moyes was appointed as the new head coach of La Liga club Real Sociedad on an 18-month deal after the dismissal of Jagoba Arrasate, with the team lying in 15th on the table. His managerial debut was an away league match against Deportivo La Coruña on 22 November, which ended in a goalless draw. Six days later, in his first home match at Anoeta, he earned his first victory as the club's coach, Carlos Vela scoring a hat-trick in a 3–0 win over Elche. On 4 January 2015, Moyes led Sociedad to a 1–0 win over Barcelona, a result which journalists compared to his management of Everton and contrasted with his results at Manchester United. Ten days later, in a 2–2 home draw against Villarreal which eliminated his team from the Copa del Rey, Moyes was sent to the stand and later given a two-match touchline ban for arguing over an offside decision.

He was dismissed on 9 November 2015 after coming under increasing pressure due to a poor start to the season.

=== Sunderland ===
On 23 July 2016, Moyes was appointed as the replacement for Sam Allardyce as manager of Sunderland, returning to the Premier League for the first time since his sacking as United boss in April 2014.

On 3 April 2017, it was revealed that Moyes had made a controversial remark after a post-match interview after Sunderland's goalless draw with Burnley on 18 March. After the interview with the BBC's Vicki Sparks, while the microphone was still audible, Moyes, said: "It was getting a wee bit naughty at the end there so just watch yourself. You still might get a slap even though you're a woman. Careful the next time you come in". Moyes apologised for the incident. The FA wrote to Moyes to ask for his observations on the incident. In June that year, he was fined £30,000 for the comments, a decision that was upheld by an independent panel the following month.

Sunderland were confirmed to be relegated to the EFL Championship for the first time in ten years on 29 April 2017, after a 1–0 loss to Bournemouth, marking the first relegation of Moyes' career. After the match, he stated that he would like to remain as manager. However, on 22 May, one day after the end of the Premier League season, Moyes resigned.

=== West Ham United ===
==== Initial stint (2017–2018) ====
Moyes was appointed manager of West Ham United on 7 November 2017, with the team in the relegation zone. Moyes marked his first game in charge of West Ham, and his 500th Premier League game, with a 2–0 loss away to Watford on 19 November. On 9 December, he won as Hammers manager for the first time, Marko Arnautović scoring the only goal of a win over reigning champions Chelsea at the London Stadium. On 13 January 2018, West Ham registered a 4–1 win away to Huddersfield, which became Moyes' 200th victory as a Premier League manager, he became only the fourth to reach this milestone, after Sir Alex Ferguson, Arsène Wenger and Harry Redknapp. Following a 2–0 win at Leicester City on 5 May 2018 and with two games remaining of the season, Moyes managed West Ham to Premier League survival for the 2017–18 season. His six-month deal with West Ham expired on 13 May 2018 and he left the club shortly after.

==== Second stint (2019–2024) ====
Moyes with West Ham United in Prague in 2023

On 30 December 2019, Moyes returned to his previous position as the manager of West Ham United on an 18-month contract. He replaced Manuel Pellegrini, who had left them in 17th in the Premier League table, one point above the relegation zone. Speaking about his return to West Ham, Moyes said, "I think there's only two or three managers with a better Premier League win record. That's what I do, I win. I'm here to get West Ham wins and get them away from the bottom three."

His first game on return resulted in a 4–0 win, against Bournemouth, in the Premier League on 1 January 2020. West Ham finished in 16th place in the Premier League with 39 points, their lowest points tally since 2010–11 when they gained 33 points and finished bottom. Moyes' 19 games in charge produced 20 points, one more than the previous 19 games managed by Manuel Pellegrini.

In the 2020–21 season, Moyes guided West Ham to a record Premier League points total of 65, finishing in sixth place and qualifying for the 2021–22 UEFA Europa League. The team won 19 Premier League games, including nine away, both records for the club. Owing to these strong performances, some West Ham supporters affectionately given the manager the moniker "Moyesiah". In June 2021, Moyes signed a new three-year contract with West Ham.

In the 2021–22 season, Moyes guided West Ham to a top-seven finish and a Europa League semi-final, where they lost 3–1 on aggregate to Eintracht Frankfurt. It was the first time in club history that the club finished in the top seven in back-to-back seasons.

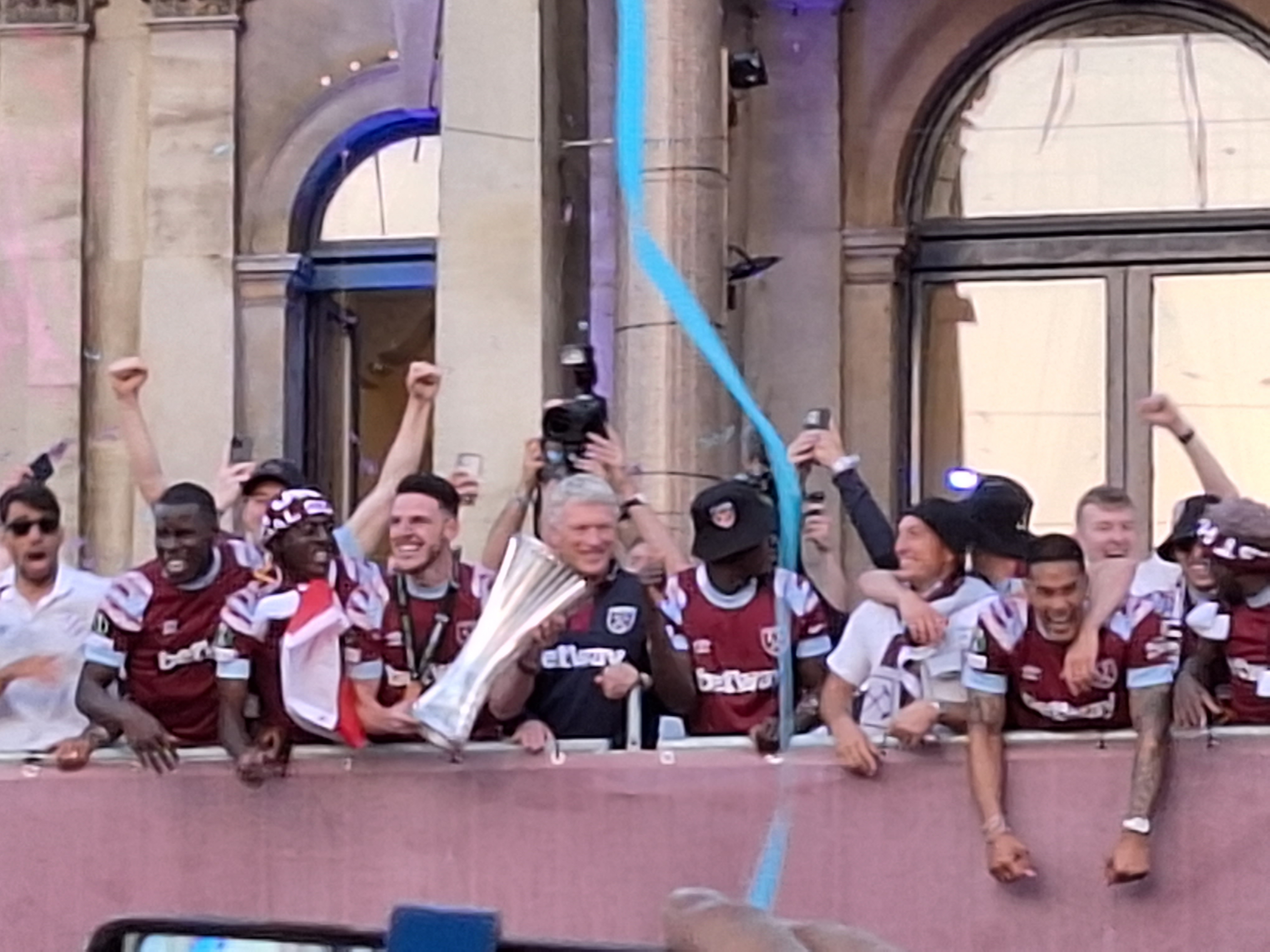
Moyes celebrating with West Ham United players after winning the 2023 UEFA Europa Conference League final

In the 2022–23 season, Moyes led the club to victory in the 2023 UEFA Europa Conference League final against Fiorentina to finish undefeated in the tournament play, winning 12 games and drawing one. West Ham finished the Premier League season in 14th place, the lowest table position any team winning a European trophy has ever finished at the time.

In February 2024, with some supporters calling for him to be replaced, Moyes said he had been offered another contract but would wait until the end of the season before deciding if he should sign it. In April 2024, after Moyes had received criticism from some fans for his perceived negative style of play, a spokesperson for West Ham said they would be waiting until the end of the season before deciding on any future contract. On 6 May 2024, West Ham confirmed that Moyes would leave the club at the end of his current contract, at the end of the 2023–24 season.

=== Return to Everton ===
On 11 January 2025, Moyes returned to Everton on a two-and-a-half-year contract, replacing previous manager Sean Dyche, who had left the club 16th in the league, one point above the relegation zone. On 19 January 2025, Moyes guided Everton to their first win in six matches in the Premier League, winning 3–2 at home against Tottenham Hotspur. On 14 March 2025, he was awarded the Premier League Manager of the Month award after Everton remained unbeaten throughout the entire month of February. Everton would remain undefeated in the league until a 1–0 loss to rivals Liverpool on 2 April 2025.

== Commentary work ==
During the 2010 FIFA World Cup in South Africa, Moyes provided some commentary for selected matches for BBC Radio 5 Live. In May 2024, Talksport announced Moyes as one of their broadcast team covering Euro 2024 in June and July 2024. He was also part of the BBC team at Euro 2024.

== Personal life ==
Moyes was born and raised in the Thornwood area of Glasgow, before his family moved to the nearby town of Bearsden. Moyes' father, David Sr, was a scout at Everton and previously a coach at Drumchapel Amateurs, where Moyes began his career. His full-time occupation was as a pattern-maker and later a lecturer at Anniesland College in North Glasgow. Moyes' mother, Joan, hailed from Portrush in Northern Ireland and worked in clothes stores in Glasgow. His cousin, Dessie Brown, is secretary of Coleraine Football Club. Moyes' nephew is former Livingston player Ewan Moyes.

Moyes is a devout Christian who would often discuss religion with Alan Comfort and Graham Daniels, although he is often reluctant to talk about his faith in interviews.

Moyes is a supporter of the Labour Party and in 2010 backed Andy Burnham to be leader in the Labour Party leadership election. During the 2014 Scottish independence referendum he was a supporter of the Better Together campaign against Scottish independence.

In 2005, Moyes received an honorary fellowship from Myerscough College near Preston. In December 2017, Moyes received another honorary fellowship from the University of Central Lancashire.

Moyes co-owns the racehorse Desert Cry, which was trained by Ginger McCain.

In April 2020, during the COVID-19 pandemic, Moyes accepted a 30% cut to his salary as West Ham looked to retain jobs allowing them to pay 100% of non-playing staff salaries. He left London during the pandemic and worked in his home village in Lancashire delivering fruit and vegetables to those in need. On 22 September 2020, shortly before an EFL Cup fixture against Hull City, Moyes and players Josh Cullen and Issa Diop tested positive for COVID-19 and left the ground before the game. His place was taken by Alan Irvine as West Ham won 5–1. He then returned a second positive test three days later.

In April 2021, Moyes spoke in favour of merging the English and Scottish football league pyramids and expanding the Premier League into two divisions.

Moyes was appointed an Officer of the Order of the British Empire (OBE) in the 2025 New Year Honours for services to football.

== Managerial statistics ==
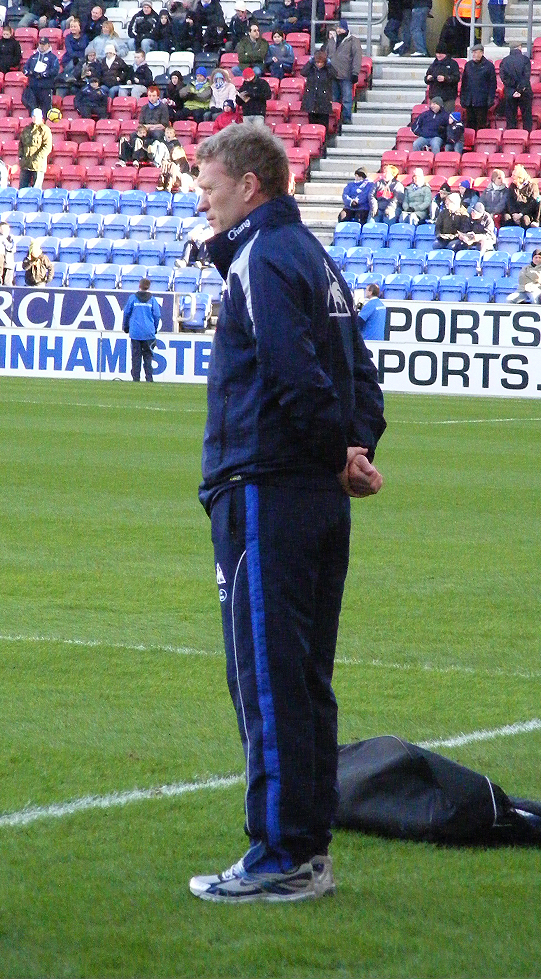
Moyes managing Everton against Wigan Athletic in January 2010

As of match played 6 November 2026

Managerial record by team and tenure
Team	From	To	Record					Ref.
Team	From	To	P	W	D	L	Win %	Ref.
Preston North End	12 January 1998	14 March 2002	234	113	58	63	48.3	
Everton	14 March 2002	5 June 2013	518	218	139	161	42.1	
Manchester United	1 July 2013	22 April 2014	51	27	9	15	52.9	
Real Sociedad	10 November 2014	9 November 2015	42	12	15	15	28.6	
Sunderland	23 July 2016	22 May 2017	43	8	7	28	18.6	
West Ham United	7 November 2017	13 May 2018	31	9	10	12	29.0	
West Ham United	30 December 2019	19 May 2024	231	103	45	83	44.6	
Everton	11 January 2025	Present	74	29	22	23	39.2	
Total			1,224	519	305	400	42.4	

== Honours ==
=== Player ===
Celtic

- Scottish Premier Division: 1981–82

Bristol City

- Associate Members' Cup: 1985–86; runner-up: 1986–87

Dunfermline Athletic

- Scottish League Cup runner-up: 1991–92

Preston North End

- Football League Third Division: 1995–96

=== Manager ===
Preston North End

- Football League Second Division: 1999–2000

Everton

- FA Cup runner-up: 2008–09

Manchester United

- FA Community Shield: 2013

West Ham United

- UEFA Europa Conference League: 2022–23

Individual

- LMA Manager of the Year: 2002–03, 2004–05, 2008–09
- Premier League Manager of the Month: November 2002, September 2004, January 2006, February 2008, February 2009, January 2010, March 2010, October 2010, September 2012, March 2013, February 2025
- London Football Awards Manager of the Year: 2021, 2022

=== Orders ===
- Officer of the Order of the British Empire: 2025

== See also ==
- List of football managers with the most matches
