= Meacock =

Meacock is a surname. Notable people with the surname include:

- Bob Meacock (1910 – after 1946), English footballer
- Kevin Meacock (born 1963), English footballer
- Lucy Meacock (born 20th century), English TV presenter and journalist
