= Carleton Leonard =

English footballer

Personal information
- Full name: Carleton Craig Leonard
- Date of birth: 3 February 1958 (age 68)
- Place of birth: Oswestry, England
- Position: Defender

Carleton Craig Leonard (born 3 February 1958) is an English former footballer who played 298 games as a defender for Shrewsbury Town between 1975 and 1983.

== Early life ==
Carelton was born in 1958, the seventh of thirteen children to Peter Leonard (1927 - 2010), a baker and Barbara née Garside (1918 - 2007). He was educated at the Oswestry Boys High School, in his home town.

== Football career ==
Carleton played for the Shropshire Schools U19s from the age of 16, and was subsequently signed by Shrewsbury Town, making his debut in 1975. The highlight of his time with The Shrews was helping them lift the old Division Three title in the 78-79 season. In his 227 league games, Leonard scored one goal against Swindon Town on 19 March 1977. After playing 298 games for Shrewsbury, he joined Hereford United in June 1983. He later went on to play for Cardiff City, with whom he was suffered relegation to the Fourth Division in the 85-86 season.

== Later life ==
After leaving football Carleton has had numerous coaching roles, including for Ellesmere Rangers, Shrewsbury Town Youth Team.

Carleton is the manager of Oswestry's only nightclub, Gibsons; in which capacity he is an advocate of liberal alcohol laws. In 2009 this establishment won the Shropshire Best Bar None award, for best night club in Shropshire.

He is also a publican, having operated Oswestry's The Bell, The Oak and The Pedigree.

He has a son Nathan, who has played for Ellesmere Rangers and Guilsfield F.C.
