= Graham Daniels =

Welsh footballer (born 1962)

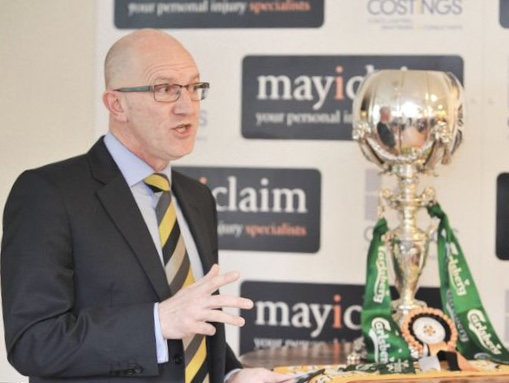

Personal information
- Full name: David Graham Daniels
- Date of birth: 9 April 1962 (age 64)
- Place of birth: Farnborough Hampshire
- Position: Left midfielder

Senior career*
| Years | Team | Apps | (Gls) |
| 1979–1982 | Cardiff City | 0 | (0) |
| 1983–1985 | Cambridge United | 42 | (4) |
| 1985–1991 | Cambridge City | 199 | (48) |

Managerial career
- 1992—1995: Sudbury Town
- 1995—1996: Histon
- 1996—1998: Cambridge City
- * Club domestic league appearances and goals

Dr Graham Daniels is a former professional footballer, now the General Director of Christians in Sport and a director of Cambridge United Football Club.

He also holds associate positions at St Andrew the Great church and Ridley Hall Theological College both in Cambridge, and is a member of the Trustee Board of the Fellowship of Christian Athletes.

== Early life ==
Daniels grew up in Llanelli, South Wales, and attended Llanelli Boys' Grammar School, where he played rugby and cricket. He was signed by Cardiff City when playing for Wales Schools under 18s.

== Playing career ==
Daniels joined Cardiff City as a schoolboy, then continued playing for the youth and reserve teams alongside studying philosophy at Cardiff University from 1980 to 1983.

After graduating, Daniels rejected contract offers from Cardiff and Bristol Rovers to sign for Cambridge United. During two seasons at the Abbey Stadium, Daniels' team-mates included David Moyes, Andy Sinton and Alan Comfort.

He left United in 1985 to join neighbours Cambridge City, and stayed with the Lilywhites until 1991.

== Managerial roles ==
At the age of 30 in July 1992, Daniels took up the role of player-coach at Sudbury Town in the Southern League. He became the manager of Histon in the Eastern Counties League in 1995, before returning to manage Cambridge City in 1996, where he remained until December 1998.

After leaving City, Daniels joined Cambridgeshire FA in 2000 as head youth coach and was involved in helping manage local league teams until 2012. He was a member of the Cambridgeshire FA Council between 2013 and 2018.

== Football Director ==
Daniels returned to Cambridge United to inaugurate and chair the Cambridge United Community Trust in 2010. The Trust has had a significant impact on the city and has earned recognition at local and national level, in particular in relation to mental health issues. Daniels was presented with the Outstanding Contribution Award in 2023 for his work for the Cambridge United Foundation, which is the new name for the Trust, and he stepped down as chair of the Foundation after 12 years in the role in 2025.

Daniels joined the club's main board in September 2013. When Paul Barry purchased the club, he seconded Daniels to become Director of Football from 2017 to 2020. Daniels helped guide the club through a turbulent time on and off the pitch, and worked alongside Ben Strang, who was appointed Head of Football, to develop a long-term leadership and management strategy.

During this period, Cambridge United went through a rebuilding phase, strengthening its board and building a structure on the playing side which led to Mark Bonner becoming head coach in 2020. At that point, Strang was promoted to Sporting Director and Daniels stepped back from the Director of Football role to return to his previous, non-executive role on the board as the U's went on to win promotion to League One in 2021.

When Cambridge United created a women's team board in 2022, Daniels became an inaugural member

== Christians in Sport ==
Daniels became a Christian during his playing career at Cambridge United and moved to Cambridge City in order to combine his football career with theological studies at the University of London and Tyndale House (Cambridge) between 1985 and 1989.

On completing his training for Christian ministry, Daniels joined the staff of Christians in Sport in 1989 and was appointed General Director in April 2002.

In light of his experience in combining the Christian faith with professional football, Daniels has published popular books explaining the relationship between Christianity and Sport, including Born to Play and The Sports Stadium

The growing cultural interest in mental health led Daniels to explore the relationship between Christian faith and athletic well-being. Daniels gained a PhD for his thesis entitled 'Identity Formation in Christian Professional Footballers' from the University of Gloucestershire in 2022 and was appointed Associate of Ridley Hall Theological College, Cambridge.

== Publications ==
=== Books ===
- Spiritual Game Plan: Competing with Joy and Godliness (with Jonny Reid)
- Racing for Glory: Eric Liddell's 1924 Olympic story (with Jonny Reid)
- My Mate's Gone Mad

=== Academic work ===
- Jones, L.; Parker, A.; Daniels, G. Sports Chaplaincy, Theology and Social Theory: Disrupting Performance-Based Identity in Elite Sporting Contexts (2020).
- Daniels, G., & Parker, A. (2023). Christianity, Identity, and Professional Football.
- Parker, A., & Daniels, G. (2025). Religion and the Rise of Sport in England.
- Daniels, G., & Parker, A. (2026). Identity Formation in Elite Sport: Christianity, Professional Soccer and Personal Integrity

== Outreach ==
=== Speaking engagements ===
Daniels has given a number of major public lectures, which has included the Prom Praise 24 at the Royal Albert Hall, and the Keswick Lecture 2024, on the subject of Eric Liddell: Safe to Serve.

He has given addresses at major academic gatherings, such as the Reformation Research Consortium (REFORC) Conference at the Old University of Wittenberg in Germany on the subject Performance-Based Identity in the Reformation and Today, the Clark Lecture 2025 at Scots College in Sydney on The Identity Game, and at the Fourth Global Congress on Sport and Christianity at Baylor University in Texas.

Daniels has been a regular speaker at St Andrew the Great Church, Cambridge since October 2000 and frequently hosts the Christians in Sport podcast.

=== Broadcasting ===
Daniels contributes regularly to BBC Radio 2's "Pause for Thought" segment.. He has spoken widely about the themes of faith and sport on mainstream media channels including Sky Sports, Talksport, the BBC, and in podcast interviews.

== Personal life ==
Daniels is married to Michelle. They have three children and six grandchildren.
