= Brian Smith (footballer, born 1966) =

English footballer

Personal information
- Date of birth: 27 October 1966 (age 60)
- Place of birth: Sheffield, England
- Height: 5 ft 9 in (1.75 m)
- Position: Defender

Youth career
- 1983–1984: Sheffield United

Senior career*
Years	Team	Apps	(Gls)
1984–1989	Sheffield United	84	(0)
1987	→ Scunthorpe United (loan)		
- * Club domestic league appearances and goals

Brian Smith (born 27 October 1966) is a former footballer who played as a defender. Born in Sheffield, England, he spent all but a short loan spell with his home town club Sheffield United.

== Career ==
Smith initially signed with Sheffield United as a YTS trainee in 1983 before turning professional in 1984. Smith made semi-regular appearances for United from that point on, initially deployed as a right-back but later as a midfielder and then more regularly as a left-back. Following a brief loan spell with Scunthorpe United in 1987, Smith had established himself in United's first team by the 1988–89 season as they were promoted to Division Two, but he broke his leg just prior to the end of the season during a home game against Preston North End. Having been hit by a serious injury, his leg broken in three places, Smith struggled to regain fitness and succumbed to a further stress fracture when he recommenced training and then a number of infections and complications, and he was eventually forced to retire without ever playing for the United first team again.

== Personal life ==
Born in Sheffield, England, Smith was the younger brother of fellow footballer Paul Smith, who played alongside him for Sheffield United.
