= Daniel Nardiello =

Footballer (born 1982)

Personal information
- Full name: Daniel Antony Nardiello
- Date of birth: 22 October 1982 (age 44)
- Place of birth: Coventry, England
- Height: 5 ft 11 in (1.80 m)
- Position: Forward

Youth career
- 1998–1999: Wolverhampton Wanderers
- 1999–2001: Manchester United

Senior career*
Years	Team	Apps	(Gls)
2001–2005	Manchester United	0	(0)
2003	→ Swansea City (loan)	4	(0)
2004	→ Barnsley (loan)	16	(7)
2004–2005	→ Barnsley (loan)	28	(7)
2005–2007	Barnsley	67	(16)
2007–2008	Queens Park Rangers	8	(0)
2008	→ Barnsley (loan)	11	(1)
2008–2010	Blackpool	7	(0)
2009	→ Hartlepool United (loan)	12	(3)
2009	→ Bury (loan)	6	(4)
2010	→ Oldham Athletic (loan)	2	(0)
2010–2012	Exeter City	66	(19)
2012–2014	Rotherham United	45	(23)
2013–2014	→ Bury (loan)	11	(5)
2014–2016	Bury	49	(16)
2016	→ Plymouth Argyle (loan)	4	(0)
2016–2017	Bangor City	32	(13)
Total		368	(123)

International career
2007–2008	Wales	3	(0)
- * Club domestic league appearances and goals

Daniel Antony Nardiello (born 22 October 1982) is a former professional footballer who played as a forward.

He began his career with Manchester United and made several first team appearances in the EFL Cup and UEFA Champions League. He went on to have an established career in the Football League for Swansea City, Barnsley, Queens Park Rangers, Blackpool, Hartlepool United, Bury, Oldham Athletic, Exeter City, Rotherham United and Plymouth Argyle. He retired in 2017 following a spell with Bangor City.

Born in England, Nardiello represented Wales and was capped three times between 2007 and 2008.

== Club career ==
=== Manchester United ===
Born in Coventry, West Midlands, Nardiello was a product of the academy of Wolverhampton Wanderers, but signed trainee terms for Manchester United in 1999. They were ordered by the Football League Appeals Committee to pay £200,000 as compensation. He progressed quickly through the club's under-17 and under-19 teams, turning professional on 22 October 1999. He made his debut for them on 5 November 2001 in a 4–0 League Cup defeat to Arsenal. In the 2002–03 season, he played in a UEFA Champions League match against Maccabi Haifa.

After scoring 12 goals for the Manchester United reserves, he was sent on a one-month loan to Swansea City on 24 October 2003 where he scored one goal in a EFL Trophy defeat to Southend United.

Nardiello spent the second half of the 2003–04 season on loan to Barnsley. He made his debut for the Tykes on 27 January 2004, scoring two goals as they beat Blackpool 3–0 at home. He scored seven goals in 16 games during his loan spell at the club before returning to Old Trafford. Having become a firm favourite with the Barnsley fans, he returned again to Oakwell on a season-long loan for the 2004–05 season. Dogged with injuries, Nardiello still managed to play in 30 games, scoring seven goals.

=== Barnsley ===
In July 2005, Nardiello signed a two-year permanent contract with Barnsley after being released by Manchester United. He scored two vital goals in Barnsley's League One play-off games. The first was the winning goal against Huddersfield Town in the second leg of the play-off semi-finals on 15 May 2006. The second was the equaliser that forced a penalty shoot-out at the Millennium Stadium in Cardiff against the club where he had previously been on loan, Swansea City, which Barnsley won 4–3 on 27 May 2006.

=== Queens Park Rangers ===
In June 2007, Nardiello turned down a new contract at Barnsley, and shunned interest from Norwich City to sign a two-year contract with fellow Championship side Queens Park Rangers, in a move that was criticised by Barnsley's then-chairman Gordon Shepherd.

In January 2008, Nardiello returned to Barnsley on loan, signing until the end of the 2007–08 season. After scoring just one goal in 13 appearances, he returned to QPR in May 2008.

=== Blackpool ===
Back at Loftus Road, Nardiello was linked with a move in July 2008 to fellow Championship side Blackpool, after struggling to make an impact at QPR. It was believed that QPR offered Nardiello's teammate Zesh Rehman on loan, £250,000 as well as Nardiello himself in return for highly rated Blackpool defender Kaspars Gorkšs. The move was completed on 30 July when Nardiello signed a two-year contract with the Seasiders.

After being injured shortly after coming on in a pre-season friendly at Tranmere Rovers, Nardiello made his league debut for the club on 13 September, when he came on as a second-half substitute as Blackpool beat his former club, Barnsley, 1–0 at Bloomfield Road. He finally made his full debut for the Seasiders on 9 January 2009, again after recovering from injury, in their 1–0 FA Cup defeat to Conference National club Torquay United.

After missing most of the Seasiders' campaign through injury, on 29 January 2009 he joined League One club Hartlepool United on loan until the end of the season. Despite scoring three goals in eight starts he returned to his parent club at the end of the loan period.

Nardiello scored his first goal for the Seasiders in a 2–1 win over Crewe Alexandra in the first round of the 2009–10 League Cup on 11 August 2009. Four days later, he made his first league appearance for Blackpool since 16 September 2008, as a second-half substitute in a 1–1 draw with Cardiff City at Bloomfield Road.

He then underwent an operation to cure a hip problem and did not play first-team football again until he joined League Two side Bury on a one-month loan on 13 November. He scored on his debut the following day in a 3–3 draw with Notts County at Gigg Lane. He was denied a second goal when his shot stuck in a puddle, inches from the goal line, allowing County goalkeeper Kasper Schmeichel to retrieve the ball. He scored again in his second game, a 1–1 draw with Shrewsbury Town at the New Meadow on 21 November. His third goal came in his fifth match on 5 December, a 2–0 home win over Barnet. After scoring four goals in six league games, Nardiello was recalled by Blackpool on 14 December to cover for injuries.

On his return to Blackpool, Nardiello was an unused substitute in a number of games, before making his second league appearance of the season on 9 January 2010 as a 77th-minute substitute in a 1–1 draw with Cardiff City at the Cardiff City Stadium. He made a late substitute appearance in the 2–2 home draw with Queens Park Rangers on 16 January, then three days later he made his first league start for Blackpool – over 17 months after he signed for the club – in the 2–1 defeat at home to Sheffield Wednesday.

On 4 March, he joined League One side Oldham Athletic on loan until the end of the season. Two days later, he made his debut in the 1–1 draw with Exeter City at St James Park. Three days later, on his home debut at Boundary Park against Leyton Orient, Nardiello tore his hamstring early in the second half and was stretchered off the pitch.

Nardiello was allowed to leave Blackpool at the end of the 2009–10 season.

=== Exeter City ===
On 5 July 2010, it was announced that Nardiello had signed for League One side Exeter City. He scored his first league goal for the club on 21 August 2010 at home to Bristol Rovers. He scored a last-minute winner against arch-rivals Plymouth Argyle in a EFL Trophy match on 9 November. Nardiello signed a new contract at Exeter City in June 2011.

=== Rotherham United ===
On 10 May 2012, Nardiello joined Rotherham United on a two-year deal. His first goal for the club was on his league debut, a penalty in the fourth minute, in a 3–0 opening day victory over Burton Albion. He helped fire the Millers to promotion by scoring 18 goals in 36 matches, becoming the club's top scorer, as they finished second.

Despite being the club's top scorer in 2012–13, he started 2013–14 on the bench behind Kieran Agard, Alex Revell and new loan signing Matt Tubbs. Nevertheless, he scored on his first appearance of the season, the equaliser in a 2–2 draw with Shrewsbury Town after being on the pitch for only three minutes, only to get sent off in the fifth minute of stoppage time. On his first start of the season against Oldham Athletic on 14 September, he scored a hat-trick, the first of his professional career, in a 3–2 win.

=== Bury ===
On 15 November 2013, he rejoined League Two side Bury on loan until January 2014. He scored the first goal of his return on 26 November 2013 with the only goal in a 1–0 win over Hartlepool. On 29 January 2014, Nardiello chose to stay on at Bury, signing an 18-month contract.

=== Bangor City ===
On 8 August 2016, Nardiello joined Welsh Premier League side Bangor City. Nardiello made his debut on 12 August 2016 in a 2–1 victory against Cefn Druids, scoring his first goal for the club. He was released by the club on 5 October 2017.

== International career ==
Because of his mixed heritage, Nardiello could have played international football for Wales (his father's birthplace), England (his own birthplace) or Italy (his grandparents' birthplace). He played at under-15 and under-16 levels for England. However, in the end he decided to follow in the footsteps of his father, Donato, who played twice for Wales in the early 1980s. He made his first appearance for Wales in a friendly against New Zealand on 26 May 2007, coming on as a 65th-minute substitute for Robert Earnshaw. He made one more appearance that year, as a substitute against Bulgaria in August 2007, before making his final appearance, again as a substitute, against Luxembourg in March 2008.

== Personal life ==
Born in England, he is the son of former Wales international Donato Nardiello, and made three appearances for the Wales national team between 2007 and 2008. His brother Michael also played professional football, as did his uncle Gerry Nardiello and cousin Reis Ashraf.

== Career statistics ==
=== Club ===
Appearances and goals by club, season and competition
Club	Season	League			National cup (Note: Includes FA Cup and Welsh Cup)		League cup (Note: Includes Football League Cup and Welsh League Cup)		Other		Total	
Club	Season	Division	Apps	Goals	Apps	Goals	Apps	Goals	Apps	Goals	Apps	Goals
Manchester United	2001–02	Premier League	0	0	0	0	1	0	0	0	1	0
Manchester United	2002–03	Premier League	0	0	0	0	1	0	1 (Note: Appearance(s) in UEFA Champions League)	0	2	0
Manchester United	2003–04	Premier League	0	0	0	0	1	0	0	0	1	0
Manchester United	2004–05	Premier League	0	0	0	0	0	0	0	0	0	0
Manchester United	Total		0	0	0	0	3	0	1	0	4	0
Swansea City (loan)	2003–04	Third Division	4	0	0	0	0	0	1 (Note: Appearance(s) in Football League Trophy)	0	5	0
Barnsley (loan)	2003–04	Second Division	16	7	—		—		—		16	7
Barnsley (loan)	2004–05	League One	28	7	0	0	2	0	1	0	31	7
Barnsley	2005–06	League One	37	7	3	0	1	0	1	1	42	8
Barnsley	2006–07	Championship	30	9	2	0	0	0	—		32	9
Barnsley	Total		67	16	5	0	1	0	1	1	74	17
QPR	2007–08	Championship	8	0	0	0	0	0	—		8	0
Barnsley (loan)	2007–08	Championship	11	1	2	0	—		—		13	1
Blackpool	2008–09	Championship	2	0	1	0	0	0	—		3	0
Blackpool	2009–10	Championship	5	0	0	0	1	1	—		6	1
Blackpool	Total		7	0	1	0	1	1	—		9	1
Hartlepool United (loan)	2008–09	League One	12	3	—		—		—		12	3
Bury (loan)	2009–10	League Two	6	4	—		—		—		6	4
Oldham Athletic (loan)	2009–10	League One	2	0	—		—		—		2	0
Exeter City	2010–11	League One	30	10	1	0	1	0	5	3	37	13
Exeter City	2011–12	League One	36	9	1	0	1	1	2	1	40	11
Exeter City	Total		66	19	2	0	2	1	7	4	77	24
Rotherham United	2012–13	League Two	36	18	3	1	1	0	1	0	41	19
Rotherham United	2013–14	League One	9	5	0	0	0	0	1	0	10	5
Rotherham United	Total		45	23	3	1	1	0	2	0	51	24
Bury (loan)	2013–14	League Two	11	5	0	0	—		—		11	5
Bury	2013–14	League Two	16	6	—		—		—		16	6
Bury	2014–15	League Two	32	10	3	2	1	0	2	2	38	14
Bury	2015–16	League One	1	0	0	0	0	0	0	0	1	0
Bury	Total		49	16	3	2	1	0	2	2	55	20
Plymouth Argyle (loan)	2015–16	League Two	4	0	—		—		0	0	4	0
Bangor City	2016–17	Welsh Premier League	30	14	1	0	0	0	—		31	14
Bangor City	2017–18	Welsh Premier League	4	0	0	0	0	0	1 (Note: Appearance(s) in UEFA Europa League)	0	5	0
Bangor City	Total		34	14	1	0	0	0	1	0	36	14
Career total			370	115	17	3	11	2	16	7	414	127

== Honours ==
Barnsley

- Football League One play-offs: 2006

Blackpool

- Football League Championship play-offs: 2010
