= Allen Price =

Welsh footballer

Personal information
- Full name: Allen Douglas Price
- Date of birth: 24 March 1968 (age 58)
- Place of birth: Gelligaer, Wales
- Position: Full-back

Youth career
- –1985: Newport County

Senior career*
Years	Team	Apps	(Gls)
1985–?	Cardiff City	2	(0)

International career
- Wales Youth
- * Club domestic league appearances and goals

Allen Douglas Price (born 24 March 1968) is a Welsh former footballer who played as a full-back in the Football League for Cardiff City.

Born in Gelligaer, Price played junior football with Newport County and was a youth international for Wales. He joined Cardiff City in August 1985, where he made two appearances.
