= Andy Edwards (footballer, born 1965) =

Welsh footballer

Personal information
- Full name: Andrew John Edwards
- Date of birth: 28 March 1965 (age 61)
- Place of birth: Wrexham, Wales
- Position: Winger

Youth career
- Wrexham

Senior career*
Years	Team	Apps	(Gls)
1982–1986	Wrexham	114	(27)
- Morecambe
- * Club domestic league appearances and goals

Andrew John Edwards (born 28 March 1965) is a Welsh former professional footballer who played as a winger. Known as The Eagle for his impressive ability in the air. He made over 100 appearances in the English Football League for Wrexham, winning their Young Player of the Season award in the 1984–85 season.

He also went on to play for Morecambe in non-league football.
