= Alan Rogers (footballer, born 1954) =

English footballer

Personal information
- Full name: Alan James Rogers
- Date of birth: 6 July 1954 (age 72)
- Place of birth: Plymouth, England
- Height: 5 ft 10 in (1.78 m)
- Position: Winger

Senior career*
Years	Team	Apps	(Gls)
1973–1979	Plymouth Argyle	117	(5)
1979–1984	Portsmouth	161	(15)
1984–1986	Southend United	87	(4)
1986–1987	Cardiff City	27	(1)
Total		392	(25)
- * Club domestic league appearances and goals

Alan James Rogers (born 6 July 1954) is an English former footballer who played as a winger.

A left-footed player, Rogers joined Plymouth Argyle as an apprentice in 1970. He made his debut three years later, and played his part in the team that reached the semi-finals of the League Cup in 1974. The club won promotion back to the Football League Second Division one year later, but Rogers only made one league appearance due to injury. He joined Portsmouth in 1979, and helped the club win two promotions in three years between 1980 and 1983. He went on to play for Southend United and Cardiff City prior to retiring from the professional game. He played a total of 454 league and cup games during his football career.

Rogers played non-league football for Falmouth Town and Saltash United, before returning to Plymouth where he owned and ran the Swinton Hotel.

Rogers was inducted into the Portsmouth F.C. Hall of Fame in March 2018.

== Honours ==
Portsmouth

- Football League Third Division: 1982–83
