= Gareth Davies (footballer, born 1959) =

Welsh footballer

Personal information
- Full name: Gareth Robert Davies
- Date of birth: 6 October 1959 (age 67)
- Place of birth: Cardiff, Wales
- Position: Midfielder

Senior career*
Years	Team	Apps	(Gls)
1986–1987	Cardiff City	2	(0)
- * Club domestic league appearances and goals

Gareth Robert Davies (born 6 October 1959) is a Welsh former professional footballer.

== Career ==
Born in Cardiff, Davies began his career with his hometown side Cardiff City in November 1982, joining from non-league side Sully. He made his debut in a 2–0 defeat against Stockport County during the 1986–87 season, but he went on to make just one more league appearance for the club before returning to non-league football.
