= Donato Nardiello =

Welsh footballer

Personal information
- Date of birth: 9 April 1957 (age 69)
- Place of birth: Cardigan, Wales
- Position: Striker

Senior career*
Years	Team	Apps	(Gls)
1977–1981	Coventry City	33	(1)
1980	Detroit Express	29	(7)
1981	Washington Diplomats	18	(0)
1981–1982	Telford United		
1982	Nuneaton Borough	12	(4)

International career
1977	Wales	2	(0)
- * Club domestic league appearances and goals

Donato Nardiello (born 9 April 1957) is a Welsh former international footballer.

He began his career as an apprentice with Coventry City, and signed a professional contract in 1977. The 1978-79 saw Donato playing in a Coventry's side containing Tommy Hutchison, Mick Ferguson, Ian Wallace, Terry Yorath, Graham Oakey, Bobby MacDonald and Jim Blyth. During his first season with the Sky Blues, he played twice for the Welsh international side.

Nardiello later played in the North American Soccer League between 1980 and 1981 for the Detroit Express and the Washington Diplomats.

== Personal ==
He is the father of Daniel Nardiello who plays for Bangor City, the brother of Gerry Nardiello, and also an uncle of Reis Ashraf, an English-born footballer representing the Pakistan national football team.
