= Nathan Joynes =

English footballer

Personal information
- Date of birth: 7 September 1985 (age 41)
- Place of birth: Barnsley, England

Team information
- Current team: Handsworth Parramore F.C.

Nathan Joynes (born 7 August 1985) is an English footballer who plays as a forward for Handsworth Parramore F.C.

== Career ==
Joynes came through the youth ranks with his hometown side Barnsley. His first team debut came on 23 April 2005 against Port Vale while still a trainee, Joynes replacing Simon Johnson as a second-half substitute in 5–0 away defeat for Barnsley. Joynes was given his first professional contract in September 2005.

Joynes joined FC Halifax Town on loan in November 2006, scoring three times in the Conference National before being recalled by Barnsley in January 2007. Later that month he joined Boston United on loan, and was a regular in their struggling side until returning to Barnsley with four games remaining and Boston deep in both financial trouble and a relegation battle. In July 2007 Joynes joined recently relegated League Two side Bradford City on loan until 1 January 2008. He played two league games before he returned to Barnsley. Two days after his return to Barnsley, Joynes and his teammate Thomas Harban, who was also on loan at Bradford, joined FC Halifax Town on a free transfer.

He moved to Stalybridge Celtic for the 2008–09 season before moving back to FC Halifax Town in March 2009 for his third spell with the club.

In August 2009 a move to Guiseley followed, before in November 2009 he signed with Matlock Town.

In October 2012 he joined Stocksbridge Park Steels. In 2015, he joined Handsworth Parramore F.C.

Senior career statistics
Club	Season(s)	League	Apps	Goals
Barnsley	2002–2008	Championship	1	0
→ Halifax Town (loan)	2006–2007	Conference National	7	3
→ Boston United (loan)	2007	Conference National	10	1
→ Bradford City (loan)	2007	League Two	2	0
FC Halifax Town	2008	Northern Premier League Premier Division	5	1
Stalybridge Celtic	2008–2009	—	—	—
Farsley Celtic	2009	—	—	—
Guiseley	2009	—	—	—
Matlock Town	2009–2012	—	—	—
Stocksbridge Park Steels	2012–2015	—	—	—
Handsworth Parramore F.C.	2015–	—	—	—
Total			25	5
