= Kevin Meacock =

English footballer

Personal information
- Full name: Kevin Michael Meacock
- Date of birth: 16 September 1963 (age 63)
- Place of birth: Bristol, England
- Position: Forward

Senior career*
Years	Team	Apps	(Gls)
1982–1983	Bristol City	0	(0)
1984	Gisborne City		
1984	Devizes Town		
1984–1986	Cardiff City	25	(3)
1986	Newcastle Austral		
1986	St George	1	(0)
1987	Gisborne City		
1990–1992	Brisbane Croatia		
1993	North Brisbane		
1993–1994	Brisbane Strikers	7	(5)
- * Club domestic league appearances and goals

Kevin Michael Meacock (born 16 September 1963) is an English former professional footballer who played as a forward. He made 25 appearances in the Football League for Cardiff City and played for several clubs on Australia and New Zealand. He is now a coach at Annerley FC in Annerley, Brisbane.

== Career ==
Born in Bristol, Meacock began his career with his hometown club Bristol City. In his only season with the first team, the club won promotion to the Third Division although Meacock made no appearances for the side. Following his release, Meacock moved to New Zealand where he played for Gisborne City, helping the club win the New Zealand National Soccer League and reach the final of the Chatham Cup where they suffered a 2–1 defeat to Manurewa.

He returned to Britain soon after and, after a brief spell with non-league Devizes Town, he signed for Cardiff City along with his former Gisborne teammate Paul McLoughlin. He made his professional debut on 15 December 1984 as a substitute during a 3–1 defeat to Wimbledon before scoring his first goals with a brace during a 2–1 victory over Middlesbrough two months later. However, he scored only one further goal during the remainder of the season and the following year he was released after losing his place in the first team.

He later moved to Australia playing for several clubs in the National Soccer League and the Queensland State League as well as returning for a second spell with Gisborne City.

Meacock currently owns and operates a football academy based in Brisbane, Australia called Respect Football. The academy is based around inclusion within sport no matter your story or background. Being a strong believer in developing kids skills at a young age, the academy aims to work with kids from the age of 5 and up.

== Later life ==
Meacock moved to Brisbane where he began coaching youth football.

== Honours ==
Gisborne City

- New Zealand National Soccer League winner: 1984
- Chatham Cup runner-up: 1984
