= Mark Farrington =

English footballer

Personal information
- Full name: Mark Anthony Farrington
- Date of birth: 15 June 1965 (age 61)
- Place of birth: Liverpool, England
- Position: Striker

Youth career
- –1983: Everton

Senior career*
Years	Team	Apps	(Gls)
1983–1985	Norwich City	18	(3)
1985	→ Cambridge United (loan)	10	(1)
1985–1986	Cardiff City	31	(3)
1986–1988	Willem II	61	(26)
1988–1989	RC Genk	17	(5)
1989–1990	Fortuna Sittard	30	(10)
1990–1991	Hertha BSC	9	(0)
1991	Feyenoord	5	(1)
1991–1994	Brighton & Hove Albion	28	(4)
1994	Hereford United	1	(0)
1994–1995	Frankwell		
1995	→ Åndalsnes (loan)		
- * Club domestic league appearances and goals

Mark Anthony Farrington (born 15 June 1965) is an English former professional footballer who played as a striker.

== Career ==
Farrington began his career as a youth player with Everton, for whom he played in the 1983 FA Youth Cup final. He failed to secure a professional contract with the Toffees and was released several weeks after the final and instead joined the side that defeated Everton in the final, Norwich City, after impressing manager Ken Brown. He made his debut for Norwich at the end of the 1983–84 season in a match against Coventry City in May 1984 and made a further 17 appearances in all competitions with the club. After struggling to establish himself in the first-team, he spent time on loan at Cambridge United in 1985 before completing a permanent transfer to Cardiff City in July 1985.

He made his debut for Cardiff on the opening day of the 1985–86 season, scoring once during a 4–1 victory over Notts County on 17 August 1985. However, the side struggled in Division Three and Farrington scored just two more league goals during the season, in victories over Lincoln City and Chesterfield, before his contract was terminated by manager Alan Durban after a breach of club discipline.

He instead moved abroad, playing in Germany, the Netherlands and Belgium before returning to England with Brighton & Hove Albion.

In late June 1995 he joined Norwegian First Division side Åndalsnes IF on loan, in order to help the team who struggled against relegation.
