= Thomas Harban =

English footballer

Personal information
- Full name: Thomas John Harban
- Date of birth: 12 November 1985 (age 41)
- Place of birth: Barnsley, England
- Height: 6 ft 0 in (1.83 m)
- Position: Defender

Team information
- Current team: Athersley rec

Youth career
- 2003–2004: Barnsley

Senior career*
Years	Team	Apps	(Gls)
2004–2008	Barnsley	0	(0)
2006–2007	→ Tamworth (loan)	4	(0)
2007	→ Bradford City (loan)	6	(0)
2008	Halifax Town	6	(0)
2008–2010	FC Halifax Town	0	(0)
- * Club domestic league appearances and goals as of 13:12, 15 August 2008 (UTC)

Thomas John Harban (born 12 November 1985) is an English footballer, who is currently without a club after being released from FC Halifax Town. He plays in defence.

== Career ==
Harban has come through the youth ranks with Barnsley he has yet to make his first team debut.

On 3 October 2006, Thomas and fellow Barnsley teammate Ryan Laight joined Conference National side Tamworth on loan. Both Harban and Laight made their first appearance for Tamworth again Aldershot Town.

Harban joined Bradford City on loan on 25 July 2007, which expired at the end of the year. He played six league games for Bradford. After his loan deal was completed, Harban and his teammate Nathan Joynes, who was also on loan at Bradford, joined Halifax Town on a free transfer.
