= Andy Kerr (footballer, born 1966) =

English footballer

Personal information
- Full name: Andrew Alphonso Kerr
- Date of birth: 7 April 1966 (age 60)
- Place of birth: West Bromwich, England
- Height: 6 ft 0 in (1.83 m)
- Position: Defender

Youth career
- West Bromwich Albion

Senior career*
Years	Team	Apps	(Gls)
1984–1986	Shrewsbury Town	10	(0)
1986–1987	Cardiff City	31	(1)
1987–1988	Telford United		
1988–1994	Wycombe Wanderers	179	(20)
- * Club domestic league appearances and goals

Andrew Alphonso Kerr (born 7 April 1966) is an English former professional footballer. He began his professional career with Shrewsbury Town before joining Cardiff City in 1986. After dropping into non-League football, Kerr helped Wycombe Wanderers win back-to-back promotions to reach the Second Division.

== Career ==
Born in West Bromwich, Kerr played for his hometown club West Bromwich Albion as a youth player but was released without making an appearance for the first team. He attracted attention from Luton Town but, when Luton eventually pulled out of offering him a permanent contract, Kerr instead signed for Shrewsbury Town in 1984. He made his professional debut two years later, making ten appearances for the side, before being released in 1986.

He joined Cardiff City and enjoyed an extended run in the first team, playing 31 league matches during the 1986–87 season and scoring his first senior goal in a 3–1 victory over Scunthorpe United. However, at the end of the season, he was again released and signed for non-League side Telford United.

In 1988, Wycombe Wanderers manager Jim Kelman paid £3,000 to sign him from Telford as a replacement for the injured Matt Crossley. He remained with Wycombe until 1993, helping the club win promotion back to the Football League and the FA Trophy, scoring one of his side's goals in a 4–1 victory over Runcorn in the final, to secure a non-League double in 1993. The club achieved back-to-back promotions into the Second Division before Kerr left the club.

== After football ==
Following his retirement, Kerr moved to the Far East where he worked as a financial advisor.

== Honours ==
Wycombe Wanderers

- Football Conference: 1992–93
- FA Trophy: 1990–91, 1992–93
