= Wayne Curtis (footballer, born 1967) =

Welsh footballer

Personal information
- Full name: Mark Wayne Curtis
- Date of birth: 22 February 1967 (age 59)
- Place of birth: Neath, Wales
- Height: 5 ft 5 in (1.65 m)
- Position: Defender

Youth career
- Swansea City

Senior career*
Years	Team	Apps	(Gls)
1984–1987	Cardiff City	27	(2)
- * Club domestic league appearances and goals

Mark Wayne Curtis (born 22 February 1967) is a Welsh former professional footballer who played in the Football League for Cardiff City.

Born in Neath, Curtis began his career with Swansea City but was released by the club without making a first-team appearance. He later attended a trial with their South Wales rivals Cardiff City and joined the club on non-contract terms. He made his debut for the Bluebirds on 21 September 1985 in a 3–0 defeat to Blackpool and his performances saw manager Alan Durban offer Curtis a full-time contract with the club. However, after making over 30 appearances in his first season, he dropped out of favour at the club under new manager Frank Burrows and made just one appearance in the following two seasons before being released at the end of the 1986–87.
