= Colin Randell =

Welsh footballer

Personal information
- Date of birth: 12 December 1952 (age 73)
- Place of birth: Neath, Wales
- Height: 5 ft 8 in (1.73 m)
- Positions: Defender; midfielder

Senior career*
| Years | Team | Apps | (Gls) |
| 1970–1973 | Coventry City | 0 | (0) |
| 1973–1977 | Plymouth Argyle | 139 | (9) |
| 1977–1979 | Exeter City | 78 | (4) |
| 1979–1982 | Plymouth Argyle | 110 | (8) |
| 1982–1985 | Blackburn Rovers | 73 | (7) |
| 1983–1984 | → Newport County (loan) | 15 | (0) |
| 1985–1987 | Swansea City | 22 | (1) |
| Total | | 437 | (29) |
- * Club domestic league appearances and goals

Colin Randell (born 12 December 1952) is a Welsh retired footballer who began his career with Coventry City and went on to play in the Football League for Plymouth Argyle, Exeter City, Blackburn Rovers, Newport County and Swansea City.

A versatile player, Randell began his career with Coventry City before joining Plymouth Argyle in 1973. He spent the next four years with the Pilgrims, helping the club reach the semi-finals of the League Cup in 1974 and promotion to the Football League Second Division the following year, before falling out of favour when Mike Kelly replaced Tony Waiters as the club's manager.

He joined former teammate Bobby Saxton at Exeter City in 1979, but returned to Plymouth Argyle when Saxton was appointed as the club's manager two years later. He was signed by Saxton again in the summer of 1982 after he became the manager of Blackburn Rovers. Randell returned to his native Wales on loan with Newport County during the 1983–84 season, and returned permanently in 1985 with Swansea City.

He went on to manage Briton Ferry Athletic and Barry Town in the Welsh football league system.
