= Gerry Nardiello =

English footballer

Personal information
- Full name: Gerardo Nardiello
- Date of birth: 5 May 1966 (age 60)
- Place of birth: Warley, England
- Height: 5 ft 10 in (1.78 m)
- Position: Forward

Senior career*
| Years | Team | Apps | (Gls) |
| 1984–1986 | Shrewsbury Town | 38 | (11) |
| 1986 | → Cardiff City (loan) | 7 | (4) |
| 1986–1988 | Torquay United | 37 | (11) |
- Barnstaple Town

International career
| 1984 | England Youth | 2 | (0) |
- * Club domestic league appearances and goals

Gerardo Nardiello (born 5 May 1966) is an English former professional footballer who played as a forward. He made over 80 appearances in the Football League during spells with Shrewsbury Town, Cardiff City and Torquay United.

== Career ==
Nardiello began his career with Shrewsbury Town, working for the club's ground staff and representing England at youth level. He made his professional debut for the club but struggled to establish himself in the first team and was eventually allowed to join Cardiff City on loan in March 1985. He scored four times in seven appearances for the club as they were relegated. After returning to Shrewsbury at the end of the season, he was sold to Torquay United where he finished his professional career. He later played for Barnstaple Town.

== Personal life ==
Several of Nardiello's relatives were also professional footballers. His brother Donato played for Coventry City and won two caps at international level for Wales. Donato's son Daniel played for several teams in the Football League and also represented Wales. Gerry's son Michael played for the youth academies at Manchester United, Liverpool and West Bromwich Albion but was released by the latter after being diagnosed with a severe case of osteitis pubis.
