= Chris Marustik =

Welsh footballer

Personal information
- Full name: Christopher Marustik
- Date of birth: 10 August 1961
- Place of birth: Swansea, Wales
- Date of death: 12 August 2015 (aged 54)
- Place of death: Morriston, Swansea, Wales
- Height: 5 ft 8 in (1.73 m)
- Position: Midfielder

Senior career*
Years	Team	Apps	(Gls)
1978–1985	Swansea City	152	(11)
1985–1987	Cardiff City	43	(1)
1987–1988	Barry Town		
1988–1989	Newport County		

International career
1982	Wales	6	(0)
- * Club domestic league appearances and goals

Christopher Marustik (10 August 1961 – 12 August 2015) was a Welsh professional footballer and Wales international.

== Club career ==
The son of a Czech immigrant, Marustik began his career at his hometown side Swansea City, making his way through the club's youth system. He made his professional debut for the club in August 1978 at the age of 17 in a 2–2 draw with Tottenham Hotspur in the second round of the League Cup.

He was forced to wait seven months before he made his league debut against Peterborough United. Marustik went on to become a regular in the Swansea lineup before leaving the club in October 1985 in a swap deal with Swansea's local rivals Cardiff City which saw Roger Gibbins move in the opposite direction. He made his debut against Gillingham before scoring his first, and what would later turn out to be his only, goal for the club on his home debut in a 3–2 win over Wigan Athletic. His time at Ninian Park was hampered by injuries and, after two years at the club, he left to play non-league football for Barry Town and Newport County before moving to Australia.

== International career ==
Marustik made his debut for Wales on 24 March 1982 in a 1–1 draw with Spain and went on to play in the next five matches for Wales, making his final appearance on 22 September of the same year in a 1–0 win over Norway.

== Personal life and death ==
In December 2008, Marustik was arrested for drunk driving after testing nearly four times over the legal limit. During the court hearing he admitted to suffering from alcohol addiction. He was later banned from driving for three years. He has three daughters: Danielle, Isobelle and Natasha.

Marustik died on 12 August 2015, aged 54, following a short illness
