= Robbie Turner =

English footballer

Personal information
- Full name: Robert Peter Turner
- Date of birth: 18 September 1966 (age 60)
- Place of birth: Easington, England
- Height: 6 ft 3 in (1.91 m)
- Position: Striker

Senior career*
| Years | Team | Apps | (Gls) |
| 1984–1985 | Huddersfield Town | 2 | (0) |
| 1985–1986 | Cardiff City | 39 | (8) |
| 1986 | → Hartlepool United (loan) | 7 | (1) |
| 1986–1987 | Bristol Rovers | 26 | (2) |
| 1987–1988 | Wimbledon | 10 | (0) |
| 1988–1990 | Bristol City | 52 | (12) |
| 1990–1992 | Plymouth Argyle | 66 | (17) |
| 1992–1993 | Notts County | 8 | (1) |
| 1993 | → Shrewsbury Town (loan) | 9 | (0) |
| 1993–1996 | Exeter City | 45 | (7) |
| 1996–1997 | Cambridge United | 17 | (4) |
| 1997 | → Hull City (loan) | 5 | (2) |
| – | Taunton Town | | |
| 2006 | Newton Abbot | | |
- * Club domestic league appearances and goals

Robert Peter Turner (born 18 September 1966) is an English former professional footballer, born in Easington, County Durham, who played as a striker for Huddersfield Town, Cardiff City, Hartlepool United, Bristol Rovers, Wimbledon, Bristol City, Plymouth Argyle, Notts County, Shrewsbury Town, Exeter City, Cambridge United and Hull City in the Football League, and for Taunton Town and Newton Abbot in non-league football. He is the younger brother of goalkeeper John Turner.
