= Ryan Laight =

English footballer

Personal information
- Full name: Ryan Laight
- Date of birth: 16 November 1985 (age 40)
- Place of birth: Barnsley, England
- Position: Centre back

Team information
- Current team: Ossett Town

Youth career
- 2003–2004: Barnsley

Senior career*
Years	Team	Apps	(Gls)
2004–2007	Barnsley	1	(0)
2006–2007	→Tamworth (loan)	13	(0)
2007	→Alfreton Town (loan)	?	(?)
2007–?	Matlock Town	?	(?)
?	Wakefield	?	(?)
2011–	Ossett Town	9	(0)
- * Club domestic league appearances and goals as of 03:52, 29 March 2012 (UTC)

Ryan Laight (born 16 November 1985 in Barnsley, England) who plays for Ossett Town. He plays in defence.

Ryan has come through the youth ranks with Barnsley, he made his debut on 4 February 2004 against Bristol City.

On 3 October 2006, Ryan and fellow Barnsley teammate Thomas Harban joined Conference National side Tamworth on loan. Both Laight and Harban made their first appearance for Tamworth against Aldershot Town.
