= Les Hunter (footballer) =

English former professional footballer

Personal information
- Full name: Leslie Hunter
- Date of birth: 5 January 1958 (age 68)
- Place of birth: Middlesbrough, England
- Height: 6 ft 2 in (1.88 m)
- Position: Centre-back

Senior career*
Years	Team	Apps	(Gls)
1975–1982	Chesterfield	165	(8)
1982–1984	Scunthorpe United	61	(8)
1984–1986	Chesterfield	99	(9)
1986–1987	Scunthorpe United	49	(5)
1987	Lincoln City		
1987–1989	Chesterfield	31	(3)
1989–1991	Matlock Town		
1991–1993	Buxton		
Total		405	(33)
- * Club domestic league appearances and goals

Leslie Hunter (born 5 January 1958) is an English former professional footballer who played as a centre-back.

== Career ==
Born in Middlesbrough, Hunter played for Chesterfield, Scunthorpe United, Lincoln City and Matlock Town.

Hunter's 15 year association with Chesterfield ended on 3 February 1989 when he agreed a lump sum settlement to end his contract with the club. He immediately joined Matlock Town, making his Northern Premier League debut for the club in the 2-1 home victory over Rhyl the following day. In August 1991 he joined Buxton, and made his debut in the club's opening day 3–1 home defeat to Morecambe in the Northern Premier League on 24 August 1991. In March 1993 he was confirmed as having been accepted into the Derbyshire Constabulary, and whilst he remained on Buxton's books, the career change meant that he would no longer play regularly.

== Honours ==
Chesterfield

- Football League Fourth Division: 1984–85
