= Alan Comfort =

English footballer (born 1964)

Personal information
- Full name: Alan Comfort
- Date of birth: 8 December 1964 (age 61)
- Place of birth: Aldershot, England
- Height: 5 ft 7 in (1.70 m)
- Position: Winger

Youth career
- –: Queens Park Rangers

Senior career*
Years	Team	Apps	(Gls)
1980–1984	Queens Park Rangers	0	(0)
1984–1986	Cambridge United	63	(5)
1986–1989	Leyton Orient	150	(46)
1989	Middlesbrough	15	(2)
Total		228	(53)

International career
1982	England U17	4	(0)
1982	England Youth	1	(0)
- * Club domestic league appearances and goals

Alan Comfort (born 8 December 1964) is an English former professional footballer who played as a winger. Active between 1980 and 1989 before his career was cut short by injury, Comfort played for four teams, scoring 53 goals in 228 games in the Football League. After retiring from football, Comfort became an Anglican vicar in the Church of England.

== Football career ==
Born in Aldershot in Hampshire, England, Comfort began his career at Queens Park Rangers, turning professional in 1980. After spending four years at Queens Park Rangers without making an appearance in the Football League, Comfort signed for Cambridge United in 1984. In two seasons with Cambridge, Comfort scored five goals in 63 games, before moving to Leyton Orient in early 1986. Comfort spent three-and-a-half seasons with Orient, scoring 46 goals in 150 appearances.

After moving to Middlesbrough in 1989, where he scored 2 goals in 15 games, Comfort's career was cut short by a knee injury at the age of 25. After playing in the 1989 Football League Fourth Division play-off final, Comfort took a helicopter to Heathrow Airport in order to catch a flight to Ireland for his wedding later that day.

== Later career ==
After retiring from football, Comfort became a radio commentator for Teesside radio station TFM for a short time.

Comfort, who had grown up in a "Christian-free zone", got to know Graham Daniels while at Cambridge, who Comfort later said was the first real Christian he had met and inspired to him go to church for the first time. In the mid-1990s, Comfort became a Church of England priest and served as chaplain to Leyton Orient for 21 years, leaving the role in 2014.

== Honours ==
Leyton Orient

- Football League Fourth Division play-offs: 1989
