= Paul McLoughlin (English footballer) =

English footballer

Personal information
- Full name: Paul McLoughlin
- Date of birth: 23 December 1963 (age 62)
- Position: Forward

Senior career*
Years	Team	Apps	(Gls)
1984	Gisborne City		
1984–1986	Cardiff City	49	(4)
1986–1987	Östers IF		
1987–1989	Hereford United	74	(14)
1989–1991	Wolverhampton Wanderers	28	(4)
1991	→ Walsall (loan)	9	(4)
1991	York City	1	(0)
1991–1994	Mansfield Town	61	(9)
1994	Bath City	16	(3)
- Weston-super-Mare
- Forest Green Rovers
- Clevedon Town

Managerial career
- 2014–2016: Clevedon Town
- * Club domestic league appearances and goals

Paul McLoughlin (born 23 December 1963) is an English former footballer. He was formerly manager of Clevedon Town.
