= 2005–06 Blackpool F.C. season =

English football club season

Blackpool F.C.
2005–06 season
- Owner: Owen Oyston
- Chairman: Karl Oyston
- Manager: Colin Hendry (until 10 November); Simon Grayson (caretaker; from 10 November)
- League One: 19th
- FA Cup: First round
- League Cup: Second round
- League Trophy: Second round
- Top goalscorer: League: Keigan Parker (12); All: Keigan Parker (13)
- Highest home attendance: 8,541 vs Gillingham, League One, 6 May 2006
- Lowest home attendance: 3,239 vs Wrexham, League Cup, 18 October 2005
- Average home league attendance: 5,820

The 2005–06 season was Blackpool F.C.'s 98th season (95th consecutive) in the Football League. It was also their fifth consecutive season in the third tier of English football. They finished in nineteenth place.

Colin Hendry was succeeded by Simon Grayson as caretaker manager in November 2005.

Keigan Parker was the club's top scorer, with thirteen goals (twelve in the league and one in the League Cup).

== Competitions ==
=== Overall record ===
Competition	First match	Last match	Starting round	Final position	Record							
Competition	First match	Last match	Starting round	Final position	Pld	W	D	L	GF	GA	GD	Win %
League One	6 August 2005	6 May 2006	Matchday 1	19th	46	12	17	17	56	64	−8	26.09
FA Cup	6 January 2006	6 January 2006	First Round	First Round	1	0	0	1	1	4	−3	0.00
League Cup	23 August 2005	20 September 2005	First Round	Second Round	2	1	0	1	3	3	+0	50.00
League Trophy	18 October 2005	22 November 2005	First Round	Second Round	2	1	0	1	5	5	+0	50.00
Total					51	14	17	20	65	76	−11	27.45

Source: Competitions

=== Football League One ===
==== League table ====
Pos	Team	Pld	W	D	L	GF	GA	GD	Pts	Qualification or relegation
17	Bournemouth	46	12	19	15	49	53	−4	55	
18	Tranmere Rovers	46	13	15	18	50	52	−2	54	
19	Blackpool	46	12	17	17	56	64	−8	53	
20	Rotherham United	46	12	16	18	52	62	−10	52	
21	Hartlepool United (R)	46	11	17	18	44	59	−15	50	Relegation to League Two

Rules for classification: 1) Points; 2) Goal difference; 3) Goals scored
(R) Relegated

==== Results ====
===== In summary =====
Overall								Home						Away					
Pld	W	D	L	GF	GA	GD	Pts	W	D	L	GF	GA	GD	W	D	L	GF	GA	GD
46	12	17	17	56	64	−8	53	9	8	6	33	27	+6	3	9	11	23	37	−14

Source: Sky

===== By matchday =====
Matchday	1	2	3	4	5	6	7	8	9	10	11	12	13	14	15	16	17	18	19	20	21	22	23	24	25	26	27	28	29	30	31	32	33	34	35	36	37	38	39	40	41	42	43	44	45	46
Ground	H	A	A	H	A	H	A	H	A	H	A	A	H	A	H	A	H	A	A	H	H	A	A	A	H	H	A	H	H	A	H	A	H	A	H	H	H	A	A	H	A	H	A	H	A	H
Result	L	D	D	D	L	W	W	L	D	W	D	L	L	D	D	L	W	L	D	L	D	D	W	L	L	W	L	D	W	W	D	L	L	D	W	D	W	L	L	W	L	W	D	D	L	D
Position	20	20	21	21	23	19	13	18	17	17	16	19	19	19	20	21	18	22	20	21	21	21	19	22	22	21	21	21	20	16	18	19	22	21	17	19	17	18	19	18	19	18	18	17	19	19

Updated to match(es) played on 05 May 2006. Source: 11v11
A = Away; H = Home; W = Win; D = Draw; L = Loss

===== In detail =====
6 August 2005 1	Blackpool	1–3	Chesterfield	Blackpool
15:00 BST	Parker 5'; Southern (yellow card) 26'	Report	Allison 23'; Bailey (yellow card) 38'; De Bolla 39'; Blatherwick 67'	Stadium: Bloomfield Road; Attendance: 6,469; Referee: Scott Mathieson

9 August 2005 2	Tranmere Rovers	2–2	Blackpool	Birkenhead
19:45 BST	Linwood (yellow card) 33'; Hume 38'; Greenacre 45'; Sharps (yellow card) 73'	Report	Doolan (yellow card) 17'; Southern (yellow card) 41'; Vernon 45'; Parker (yellow card) 39'; Murphy 69'	Stadium: Prenton Park; Attendance: 7,509; Referee: Mick Fletcher

13 August 2005 3	Yeovil Town	1–1	Blackpool	Yeovil
15:00 BST	Gall (yellow card) 19'; Amankwaah 45'	Report	Murphy 15'; Parker (yellow card) 17'; Coid (yellow card) 72'; Clarke (yellow card) 76'	Stadium: Huish Park; Attendance: 5,698; Referee: Trevor Kettle

20 August 2005 4	Blackpool	0–0	Swindon Town	Blackpool
15:00 BST	Parker (yellow card) 35'; Coid (yellow card) 90'	Report	Ifil (yellow card) 68'; Jenkins (yellow card) 72'	Stadium: Bloomfield Road; Attendance: 4,661; Referee: Nigel Miller

27 August 2005 5	Rotherham United	4–0	Blackpool	Rotherham
15:00 BST	Mullin 40'; Burton 58' (pen.), 59', 86'	Report	Coid (yellow card) 44'	Stadium: Millmoor; Attendance: 4,384; Referee: Grant Hegley

29 August 2005 6	Blackpool	1–0	Bradford City	Blackpool
15:00 BST	Edwards (yellow card) 19' (yellow-red card) 37'; Coid (yellow card) 55'; Grayson (yellow card) 58'; Wiles 84', (yellow card) 85'	Report	Wetherall (yellow card) 83'	Stadium: Bloomfield Road; Attendance: 6,468; Referee: Lee Mason

2 September 2005 7	Doncaster Rovers	0–1	Blackpool	Doncaster
19:45 BST	Ryan (yellow card) 70'	Report	Donnelly 67'	Stadium: Earth Stadium; Attendance: 5,484; Referee: Kevin Wright

10 September 2005 8	Blackpool	1–2	Hartlepool United	Blackpool
15:00 BST	Southern (yellow card) 26'; Wright 70'	Report	Humphreys (yellow card) 31'; Nelson (yellow card) 36'; Sweeney 86'; Istead 90'	Stadium: Bloomfield Road; Attendance: 5,494; Referee: Paul Robinson

17 September 2005 9	Bristol City	1–1	Blackpool	Bristol
15:00 BST	Stewart (yellow card) 24'; Gillespie (yellow card) 30'; Murray (yellow card) 37'; Cotterill 85'	Report	Clarke (yellow card) 33'; Wright (yellow card) 39'; Butler (yellow card) 50'; Blinkhorn 90'	Stadium: Ashton Gate; Attendance: 9,576; Referee: Paul Melin

24 September 2005 10	Blackpool	3–2	Milton Keynes Dons	Blackpool
15:00 BST	Clarke 17'; Mills 50' (o.g.); Burns 68'	Report	Rizzo 19' (pen.); Small 34'	Stadium: Bloomfield Road; Attendance: 4,723; Referee: Andy Penn

27 September 2005 11	Nottingham Forest	1–1	Blackpool	West Bridgford
19:45 BST	Friio (yellow card) 22'; Breckin 79'; Taylor (yellow card) 79'	Report	Parker 24', (yellow card) 45'; McGregor (yellow card) 63'	Stadium: The City Ground; Attendance: 17,071; Referee: Mike Thorpe

1 October 2005 12	Swansea City	3–2	Blackpool	Swansea
15:00 BST	Trundle 22'; Iriekpen (yellow card) 30'; Akinfenwa 44', (yellow card) 86'; Ricketts (yellow card) 74'; Britton 81'	Report	Morris (yellow card) 29'; Parker 36'; Donnelly 70', (yellow card) 80'	Stadium: New Stadium Swansea; Attendance: 13,911; Referee: Ray Olivier

9 October 2005 13	Blackpool	1–2	Colchester United	Blackpool
15:00 BST	Wright (yellow card) 20', (goal) 90'; Burns (yellow card) 33'; McGregor (yellow card) 44'	Report	Halford 16', 90'	Stadium: Bloomfield Road; Attendance: 4,793; Referee: Chris Foy

15 October 2005 14	Barnsley	2–2	Blackpool	Barnsley
15:00 BST	Richards 81'; Howard 84'	Report	Wiles 29'; Wright 68'	Stadium: Oakwell; Attendance: 7,945; Referee: Colin Webster

22 October 2005 15	Blackpool	0–0	Brentford	Blackpool
15:00 BST	Wright (yellow card) 27' (yellow-red card) 34'; Clarke (yellow card) 35'; Prendergast (yellow card) 36'; Edwards (yellow card) 78'	Report	Pratley (yellow card) 51'; Tabb (yellow card) 90'	Stadium: Bloomfield Road; Attendance: 5,041; Referee: Andy Woolmer

29 October 2005 16	Gillingham	2–1	Blackpool	Gillingham
15:00 BST	Hope 49'; Harris 65'; Williams (yellow card) 90'	Report	Edwards (yellow card) 10'; Parker 23', (red card) 77'	Stadium: Priestfield Stadium; Attendance: 6,300; Referee: Paul Armstrong

13 November 2005 17	Blackpool	5–2	Scunthorpe United	Blackpool
16:00 GMT	Doolan (yellow card) 12'; Morris 18', 90', (yellow card) 66'; Clarke (yellow card) 35'; Wright 45', (yellow card) 48'; Murphy 84'	Report	Sharp 3', 35' (pen.); Crosby (red card) 20'	Stadium: Bloomfield Road; Attendance: 6,016; Referee: Michael Jones

19 November 2005 18	Colchester United	3–2	Blackpool	Colchester
15:00 GMT	Iwelumo 34', 54' (pen.); Halford 81'	Report	Wright (yellow card) 56', (goal) 90'; Murphy 67'; Southern (yellow card) 84'; Doolan (yellow card) 89'	Stadium: Layer Road; Attendance: 3,031; Referee: Grant Hegley

26 November 2005 19	Chesterfield	1–1	Blackpool	Chesterfield
15:00 GMT	Clingan 8', (red card) 13'; Bailey (yellow card) 62'	Report	Donnelly (red card) 13'; Harkins 58'	Stadium: Saltergate; Attendance: 4,585; Referee: Gary Sutton

6 December 2005 20	Blackpool	1–3	AFC Bournemouth	Blackpool
19:45 GMT	Wright 5'; Edwards (yellow card) 67'; Clarke (yellow card) 89'	Report	Hayter 26', 27', 68' (pen.); Hart (yellow card) 78'	Stadium: Bloomfield Road; Attendance: 4,326; Referee: Andy Penn

10 December 2005 21	Blackpool	1–1	Tranmere Rovers	Blackpool
15:00 GMT	Morris (yellow card) 87'; Clarke 90+2'	Report	Wilson (yellow card) 68'; Facey 81'	Stadium: Bloomfield Road; Attendance: 5,069; Referee: Tony Bates

17 December 2005 22	Swindon Town	0–0	Blackpool	Swindon
15:00 GMT	Smith (yellow card) 39'; Holgate (yellow card) 84'	Report	Doolan (yellow card) 84'	Stadium: County Ground; Attendance: 5,766; Referee: Trevor Parkes

26 December 2005 23	Port Vale	1–2	Blackpool	Stoke-on-Trent
15:00 GMT	Birchall (yellow card) 57'; Fortune 58'	Report	Wiles 52'; Parker 54'; Wilcox (yellow card) 57'; McGregor (yellow card) 64'; Wright (yellow card) 90+2'	Stadium: Vale Park; Attendance: 5,666; Referee: Mike Russell

31 December 2005 24	Walsall	2–0	Blackpool	Walsall
13:30 GMT	Taylor (yellow card) 42'; Constable 46', 52'	Report	Parker (yellow card) 43'	Stadium: Bescot Stadium; Attendance: 5,046; Referee: Steve Dorr

2 January 2006 25	Blackpool	1–2	Southend United	Blackpool
15:00 GMT	Southern (yellow card) 64'; Parker 75', (yellow card) 85'	Report	Bentley 39'; Eastwood 89'	Stadium: Bloomfield Road; Attendance: 5,271; Referee: Matt Messias

10 January 2006 26	Blackpool	1–0	Oldham Athletic	Blackpool
19:45 GMT	Southern (yellow card) 18'; Gobern 48', (yellow card) 86'	Report	Hughes (yellow card) 35'; Wellens (yellow card) 86'	Stadium: Bloomfield Road; Attendance: 5,977; Referee: Phil Dowd

14 January 2006 27	Huddersfield Town	2–0	Blackpool	Huddersfield
15:00 GMT	Clarke 9'; Abbott (yellow card) 60'; Schofield (yellow card) 73'	Report	Joseph (yellow card) 50'; Donnelly (yellow card) 59'; Clarke (yellow card) 65'	Stadium: Galpharm Stadium; Attendance: 11,977; Referee: Clive Oliver

21 January 2006 28	Blackpool	1–1	Bristol City	Blackpool
15:00 GMT	Murphy 5'; Parker (yellow card) 45'; Fox (yellow card) 90'	Report	Brooker 26'; Noble (yellow card) 45'	Stadium: Bloomfield Road; Attendance: 4,842; Referee: Michael Jones

24 January 2006 29	Blackpool	4–2	Doncaster Rovers	Blackpool
19:45 GMT	Wilcox (yellow card) 5'; Butler 16'; Morris 42'; Parker 44'; Clarke 54'	Report	Guy (yellow card) 15'; McIndoe 26' (pen.); McCormack 90'	Stadium: Bloomfield Road; Attendance: 4,836; Referee: Phil Joslin

28 January 2006 30	Hartlepool United	0–3	Blackpool	Hartlepool
15:00 GMT	Pittman (yellow card) 25'; Barron (red card) 27'; Nelson (yellow card) 73'	Report	Wood (red card) 10'; Clarke 28' (pen.), 74' (pen.); Parker (yellow card) 47', (goal) 82'; Butler (yellow card) 72'	Stadium: Victoria Park; Attendance: 4,421; Referee: Carl Boyeson

4 February 2006 31	Blackpool	2–2	Nottingham Forest	Blackpool
15:00 GMT	Bean 16'; Morris (yellow card) 35'; Fox 47'; Prendergast (yellow card) 60'	Report	Morgan (yellow card) 17' (yellow-red card) 67'; Breckin 45'; Bennett 90'	Stadium: Bloomfield Road; Attendance: 8,399; Referee: Dermot Gallagher

11 February 2006 32	Milton Keynes Dons	3–0	Blackpool	Milton Keynes
15:00 GMT	McLeod 26', 87'; Taylor 51'	Report	Butler (yellow card) 14' (yellow-red card) 54'; Taylor (yellow card) 77'	Stadium: National Hockey Stadium; Attendance: 5,691; Referee: Kevin Friend

14 February 2006 33	Blackpool	0–1	Huddersfield Town	Blackpool
19:45 GMT	Wilcox (red card) 42'; Blinkhorn (yellow card) 48'; Southern (yellow card) 62'	Report	Brandon 43' (pen.); Taylor-Fletcher (yellow card) 67'	Stadium: Bloomfield Road; Attendance: 6,004; Referee: Trevor Parkes

18 February 2006 34	AFC Bournemouth	1–1	Blackpool	Bournemouth
15:00 GMT	Pitman 4'	Report	Murphy 61'; Bean (yellow card) 86'	Stadium: Fitness First Stadium; Attendance: 5,349; Referee: Iain Williamson

25 February 2006 35	Blackpool	2–0	Yeovil Town	Blackpool
15:00 GMT	Bean (yellow card) 38'; Lindegaard 51' (o.g.); Murphy 54'	Report		Stadium: Bloomfield Road; Attendance: 5,747; Referee: Paul Robinson

11 March 2006 36	Blackpool	0–0	Rotherham United	Blackpool
15:00 GMT		Report	Butler (red card) 43'; Robertson (yellow card) 66'; Hurst (yellow card) 71'	Stadium: Bloomfield Road; Attendance: 5,934; Referee: Peter Walton

18 March 2006 37	Blackpool	1–0	Port Vale	Blackpool
15:00 GMT	Williams 66'	Report	James (yellow card) 20'	Stadium: Bloomfield Road; Attendance: 5,494; Referee: Michael Jones

21 March 2006 38	Bradford City	1–0	Blackpool	Bradford
19:45 GMT	Brown (yellow card) 52', (goal) 90'	Report		Stadium: Bradford and Bingley Stadium; Attendance: 7,192; Referee: Ray Olivier

25 March 2006 39	Oldham Athletic	3–1	Blackpool	Oldham
15:00 GMT	Beckett 45', 55', 86' (pen.)	Report	Southern 42', (yellow card) 43'; Joseph (yellow card) 67'; Prendergast (yellow card) 82'	Stadium: Boundary Park; Attendance: 6,480; Referee: Andy Hall

1 April 2006 40	Blackpool	2–0	Walsall	Blackpool
15:00 BST	Williams 49'; Southern 57'	Report	Roper (yellow card) 47'; Gerrard (yellow card) 66'	Stadium: Bloomfield Road; Attendance: 6,129; Referee: Richard Beeby

8 April 2006 41	Southend United	2–1	Blackpool	Southend
15:00 BST	Eastwood 60'; Guttridge 86'	Report	Williams 32'	Stadium: Roots Hall; Attendance: 8,180; Referee: Andy Woolmer

15 April 2006 42	Blackpool	1–0	Swansea City	Blackpool
15:00 BST	Joseph (yellow card) 56'; Parker 59'; Stockley (yellow card) 81'; Blinkhorn (yellow card) 90'	Report	Trundle (yellow card) 9'; Martinez (yellow card) 22'	Stadium: Bloomfield Road; Attendance: 6,709; Referee: Tony Bates

17 April 2006 43	Brentford	1–1	Blackpool	Brentford
15:00 BST	Owusu 54' (pen.); Newman (yellow card) 87'; Tabb (yellow card) 90'	Report	Edwards (yellow card) 53'; Prendergast (yellow card) 75'; Southern (yellow card) 81'; Clarke 89'	Stadium: Griffin Park; Attendance: 7,339; Referee: Clive Penton

22 April 2006 44	Blackpool	1–1	Barnsley	Blackpool
15:00 BST	Parker 21', (yellow card) 81'	Report	Nardiello (yellow card) 28'; Howard 53'; Reid (yellow card) 81' (yellow-red card); Kay (yellow card) 83'; Hayes (yellow card) 89'; McPhail (yellow card) 90'	Stadium: Bloomfield Road; Attendance: 6,912; Referee: Colin Webster

17 April 2006 45	Scunthorpe United	1–0	Blackpool	Scunthorpe
15:00 BST	Sharp 90', (yellow card) 90'	Report	Donnelly (yellow card) 66'	Stadium: Glanford Park; Attendance: 5,917; Referee: Jonathan Moss

6 May 2006 46	Blackpool	3–3	Gillingham	Blackpool
13:00 BST	Blinkhorn 13'; Parker 56', 69'	Report	Byfield 28', 52'; Jarvis (yellow card) 45'; Jackman (yellow card) 80'; Flynn 86'	Stadium: Bloomfield Road; Attendance: 8,541; Referee: Steve Tanner

=== FA Cup ===
6 January 2006 First Round	Doncaster Rovers	4–1	Blackpool	Doncaster
15:00 GMT	Heffernan 18', 72'; Offiong (yellow card) 30'; McIndoe 53' (pen.), 56' (pen.); Coulson 81'; Odejayi (yellow card) 82'	Report	Edwards (yellow card) 57'; Doolan (yellow card) 70'; Clarke 90+2' (pen.)	Stadium: Earth Stadium; Attendance: 4,332; Referee: Nigel Miller

=== Football League Cup ===
23 August 2005 First Round	Blackpool	2–1	Hull City	Blackpool
19:45 BST	Clarke 29' (pen.); Grayson 39'	Report	Price 4'; Wiseman (yellow card) 86'	Stadium: Bloomfield Road; Attendance: 3,819; Referee: Eddie Ilderton

20 September 2005 Second Round	Leicester City	2–1	Blackpool	Leicester
19:45 BST	de Vries 17', 79'	Report	McGregor (yellow card) 38'; Parker 68'; Clarke (yellow card) 89'	Stadium: Walkers Stadium; Attendance: 7,386; Referee: Clive Penton

=== Football League Trophy ===
18 October 2005 First Round	Blackpool	4–3 (a.e.t.)	Wrexham	Blackpool
19:45 BST	Blinkhorn 2'; Wright (yellow card) 37'; Doolan (yellow card) 62'; McGregor 84'; Southern (yellow card) 87', (goal) 99'; Vernon 104'	Report	Bayliss (yellow card) 37'; Jones 77', 78'; Ferguson 96'	Stadium: Bloomfield Road; Attendance: 3,239; Referee: Clive Oliver

22 November 2005 Second Round	Carlisle United	2–1	Blackpool	Carlisle
19:45 GMT	Hawley 63'; Holmes 67'	Report	Harkins 62'	Stadium: Brunton Park; Attendance: 2,987; Referee: Eddie Ilderton

== Squad statistics ==
=== Appearances and goals ===
No.	Pos.	Nat.	Name	League One		FA Cup		League Cup		League Trophy		Total	
No.	Pos.	Nat.	Name	Apps	Goals	Apps	Goals	Apps	Goals	Apps	Goals	Apps	Goals
1	GK	(Wales)	Lee Jones	31	0	0	0	0	0	0	0	31	0
2	DF	(England)	Mark McGregor	21	0	1	0	2	0	1	1	25	1
2	DF	(England)	Sam Stockley	7	0	0	0	0	0	0	0	7	0
3	MF	(England)	Gareth Evans	0	0	0	0	0	0	0	0	0	0
4	MF	(England)	Keith Southern	42	2	1	0	1	0	2	1	46	3
5	DF	(England)	Tony Butler	24	1	0	0	1	0	1	0	26	1
6	DF	(England)	Peter Clarke	46	6	1	1	2	1	1	0	50	8
7	FW	(Scotland)	Keigan Parker	40	12	0	0	2	1	1	0	43	13
8	MF	(England)	John Doolan	19	0	1	0	2	0	2	0	24	0
8	MF	(Wales)	Gareth Williams	9	3	0	0	0	0	0	0	9	3
9	FW	(England)	John Murphy	34	8	1	0	1	0	1	0	37	8
10	FW	(England)	Scott Vernon	17	1	1	0	1	0	1	1	20	2
11	MF	(England)	Rory Prendergast	24	0	1	0	2	0	1	0	28	0
12	MF	(England)	Danny Coid	13	0	0	0	1	0	2	0	16	0
14	FW	(England)	Matthew Blinkhorn	16	2	1	0	1	0	1	1	19	3
15	MF	(England)	Ciaran Donnelly	24	2	0	0	2	0	1	0	27	2
16	MF	(England)	Jamie Burns	6	1	0	0	1	0	1	0	8	1
17	MF	(England)	Simon Wiles	28	3	1	0	1	0	2	0	32	3
18	DF	(Wales)	Rob Edwards	32	0	1	0	1	0	1	0	35	0
19	MF	(England)	Phil Doughty	0	0	0	0	0	0	0	0	0	0
20	DF	(England)	Simon Grayson	12	0	1	0	2	1	1	0	16	1
21	MF	(Scotland)	Stuart Anderson	0	0	0	0	1	0	0	0	1	0
22	FW	(England)	Matt Shaw	0	0	0	0	0	0	0	0	0	0
23	GK	(England)	Lewis Edge	1	0	0	0	0	0	0	0	1	0
24	MF	(Scotland)	Sean Paterson	0	0	0	0	0	0	0	0	0	0
25	GK	(Australia)	Les Pogliacomi	15	0	1	0	2	0	2	0	20	0
26	MF	(England)	David Fox	7	1	0	0	0	0	0	0	7	1
26	FW	(England)	Tommy Wright	13	6	0	0	0	0	2	0	15	6
27	DF	(England)	Danny Warrender	15	0	1	0	0	0	1	0	17	0
28	MF	(Republic of Ireland)	Ian Morris	30	3	0	0	0	0	1	0	31	3
29	MF	(Scotland)	Gary Harkins	4	1	0	0	0	0	1	1	5	2
29	MF	(Scotland)	Keith Lasley	8	0	0	0	0	0	0	0	8	0
30	DF	(England)	Chris Armstrong	5	0	0	0	0	0	1	0	6	0
30	MF	(England)	Lewis Gobern	8	1	0	0	0	0	0	0	8	1
31	MF	(England)	Jason Wilcox	26	0	0	0	0	0	0	0	26	0
32	MF	(England)	Matty Kay	1	0	0	0	0	0	0	0	1	0
33	DF	(Antigua and Barbuda)	Marc Joseph	16	0	0	0	0	0	0	0	16	0
34	DF	(England)	Dean Gordon	1	0	0	0	0	0	0	0	1	0
34	DF	(England)	Andy Taylor	3	0	0	0	0	0	0	0	3	0
35	FW	(England)	Neil Wood	7	0	0	0	0	0	0	0	7	0
36	FW	(Finland)	Njazi Kuqi	4	0	0	0	0	0	0	0	4	0
37	DF	(England)	Sean Taylor	4	0	0	0	0	0	0	0	4	0
38	MF	(Jamaica)	Marcus Bean	17	1	0	0	0	0	0	0	0	0

- Players used: 38
- Goals scored: 64 (including 2 own goals)

=== Goalscorers ===
Rank	Pos.	Player	League One	FA Cup	League Cup	League Trophy	Total
1	FW	(Scotland) Keigan Parker	12	0	1	0	13
2	DF	(England) Peter Clarke	6	1	1	0	8
2	FW	(England) John Murphy	8	0	0	0	8
3	FW	(England) Tommy Wright	6	0	0	0	6
4	MF	(England) Keith Southern	2	0	0	1	3
4	MF	(England) Simon Wiles	3	0	0	0	3
4	MF	(Republic of Ireland) Ian Morris	3	0	0	0	3
4	FW	(England) Matthew Blinkhorn	2	0	0	1	3
4	MF	(Wales) Gareth Williams	3	0	0	0	3
5	MF	(England) Ciaran Donnelly	2	0	0	0	2
5	FW	(England) Scott Vernon	1	0	0	1	2
5	MF	(Scotland) Gary Harkins	1	0	0	1	2
6	DF	(England) Tony Butler	1	0	0	0	1
6	DF	(England) Mark McGregor	0	0	0	1	1
6	DF	(England) Simon Grayson	0	0	1	0	1
6	MF	(England) Jamie Burns	1	0	0	0	1
6	MF	(England) Lewis Gobern	1	0	0	0	1
6	MF	(England) David Fox	1	0	0	0	1
Own Goals			2	0	0	0	2
Total			55	1	3	5	64

=== Clean sheets ===
Rank	Pos.	Player	League One	FA Cup	League Cup	League Trophy	Total
1	GK	(Wales) Lee Jones	8	0	0	0	8
2	GK	(Australia) Les Pogliacomi	4	0	0	0	4
Total			12	0	0	0	12

=== Disciplinary record ===
No.	Pos.	Player	League One		FA Cup		League Cup		League Trophy		Totals		
No.	Pos.	Player	Yellow card	Red card	Yellow card	Red card	Yellow card	Red card	Yellow card	Red card	Yellow card	Red card	Pts.
7	FW	(Scotland) Keigan Parker	9	1	0	0	0	0	0	0	9	1	12
4	MF	(England) Keith Southern	9	0	0	0	0	0	1	0	10	0	10
26	FW	(England) Tommy Wright	5	1	0	0	0	0	1	0	6	1	9
18	DF	(Wales) Rob Edwards	4	1	1	0	0	0	0	0	5	1	8
6	DF	(England) Peter Clarke	6	0	0	0	1	0	0	0	7	0	7
8	MF	(England) John Doolan	4	0	1	0	0	0	1	0	6	0	6
15	MF	(England) Ciaran Donnelly	3	1	0	0	0	0	0	0	3	1	6
5	DF	(England) Tony Butler	2	1	0	0	0	0	0	0	2	1	5
31	MF	(England) Jason Wilcox	2	1	0	0	0	0	0	0	2	1	5
12	MF	(England) Danny Coid	4	0	0	0	0	0	0	0	4	0	4
2	DF	(England) Mark McGregor	3	0	0	0	1	0	0	0	4	0	4
28	MF	(Republic of Ireland) Ian Morris	4	0	0	0	0	0	0	0	4	0	4
11	MF	(England) Rory Prendergast	4	0	0	0	0	0	0	0	4	0	4
33	MF	(Antigua and Barbuda) Marc Joseph	3	0	0	0	0	0	0	0	3	0	3
38	MF	(Barbados) Marcus Bean	2	0	0	0	0	0	0	0	2	0	2
14	FW	(England) Matthew Blinkhorn	2	0	0	0	0	0	0	0	2	0	2
16	MF	(England) Jamie Burns	1	0	0	0	0	0	0	0	1	0	1
26	MF	(England) David Fox	1	0	0	0	0	0	0	0	1	0	1
30	MF	(England) Lewis Gobern	1	0	0	0	0	0	0	0	1	0	1
20	DF	(England) Simon Grayson	1	0	0	0	0	0	0	0	1	0	1
2	DF	(England) Sam Stockley	1	0	0	0	0	0	0	0	1	0	1
37	DF	(England) Sean Taylor	1	0	0	0	0	0	0	0	1	0	1
17	MF	(England) Simon Wiles	1	0	0	0	0	0	0	0	1	0	1
Total			73	6	2	0	2	0	3	0	80	6	98

== Transfers ==
=== Transfers in ===
Date	Pos.	Nat.	Name	From	Fee	Ref.
3 June 2005	CM	(England)	John Doolan	Doncaster Rovers	Free	
8 June 2005	CF	(England)	Scott Vernon	Oldham Athletic	Part-exchange deal with Richie Wellens	
22 July 2005	CM	(England)	Rory Prendergast	Accrington Stanley	Free	
20 August 2005	GK	(Australia)	Les Pogliacomi	Oldham Athletic	Free	
9 January 2006	LB	(England)	Dean Gordon	Free agency	Free	
11 January 2006	CB	(Antigua and Barbuda)	Marc Joseph	Hull City	Free	
20 January 2006	CM	(England)	David Fox	Manchester United	Free	
23 January 2006	CM	(Jamaica)	Marcus Bean	Queens Park Rangers	Free	
23 January 2006	RB	(England)	Danny Warrender	Manchester City	Free	
28 January 2006	LW	(England)	Jason Wilcox	Leicester City	Free	
31 January 2006	CM	(England)	Neil Wood	Manchester United	Free	

=== Loans in ===
Date	Pos.	Nat.	Name	From	Until	Ref.
31 August 2005	CF	(England)	Tommy Wright	Leicester City	31 December 2005	
23 September 2005	CM	(Republic of Ireland)	Ian Morris	Leeds United	31 May 2005	
13 October 2005	LB	(England)	Chris Armstrong	Sheffield United	13 November 2005	
16 November 2005	AM	(Scotland)	Gary Harkins	Blackburn Rovers	18 December 2005	
24 November 2005	RW	(England)	Lewis Gobern	Wolverhampton Wanderers	25 January 2006	
20 January 2006	CM	(England)	Neil Wood	Manchester United	30 January 2006	
23 January 2006	CF	(Finland)	Njazi Kuqi	Birmingham City	23 February 2006	
25 January 2006	CM	(England)	Sean Taylor	Sunderland	7 May 2006	
10 February 2006	DM	(Scotland)	Keith Lasley	Plymouth Argyle	7 May 2006	
16 February 2006	CF	(England)	Andy Taylor	Blackburn Rovers	7 May 2006	
17 March 2006	CF	(Wales)	Gareth Williams	Colchester United	7 May 2006	

=== Transfers out ===
Date	Pos.	Nat.	Name	To	Fee	Ref.
7 May 2006	LB	(England)	Gareth Evans	Free agency	Retired	
7 May 2006	RW	(Suriname)	Dean Gorré	Free agency	Retired	
7 May 2006	CM	(England)	Simon Grayson	Free agency	Retired	
10 May 2005	CF	(Serbia and Montenegro)	Žarko Grabovač	Fortuna Sittard	Released	
10 May 2005	CF	(England)	Andy Mangan	Accrington Stanley	Released	
10 May 2005	LB	(England)	Leam Richardson	Accrington Stanley	Released	
19 May 2005	DM	(England)	Martin Bullock	Macclesfield Town	Released	
28 May 2005	LB	(England)	Paul Edwards	Oldham Athletic	Free	
4 July 2005	CM	(England)	Richie Wellens	Oldham Athletic	Part-exchange deal with Scott Vernon	
19 January 2006	CB	(England)	Mark McGregor	Port Vale	Free	

=== Loans out ===
Date	Pos.	Nat.	Name	To	Until	Ref.
31 January 2006	CM	(Scotland)	Stuart Anderson	Ross County	7 May 2006	
17 March 2006	CF	(England)	Scott Vernon	Colchester United	7 May 2006	
23 March 2006	CM	(England)	Jamie Burns	Bury	7 May 2006	
