= 2023–24 EFL League One =

20th season of EFL League One

EFL League One
- Season: 2023–24
- Dates: 5 August 2023 – 27 April 2024
- Champions: Portsmouth; 1st League One title 4th 3rd tier title
- Promoted: Portsmouth; Derby County; Oxford United
- Relegated: Cheltenham Town; Fleetwood Town; Port Vale; Carlisle United
- Matches: 462
- Goals: 1,177 (2.55 per match)
- Top goalscorer: Alfie May (23 goals)
- Biggest home win: Barnsley 7–0 Port Vale (5 August 2023); Bolton Wanderers 7–0 Exeter City (25 November 2023)
- Biggest away win: Leyton Orient 0–4 Portsmouth (12 August 2023); Bolton Wanderers 0–4 Wigan Athletic (19 August 2023); Cambridge United 0–4 Barnsley (3 October 2023); Portsmouth 0–4 Blackpool (25 November 2023); Carlisle 0–4 Cambridge United (17 February 2024); Barnsley 1–5 Lincoln City (9 March 2024); Burton 0–4 Oxford United (6 April 2024)
- Highest scoring: Barnsley 7–0 Port Vale (5 August 2023); Bolton Wanderers 7–0 Exeter City (25 November 2023); Wycombe Wanderers 5–2 Peterborough United (10 February 2024); Leyton Orient 4–3 Northampton Town (13 February 2024); Bolton Wanderers 5–2 Reading (1 April 2024)
- Longest winning run: Bolton Wanderers (6 games)
- Longest unbeaten run: Portsmouth (17 games)
- Longest winless run: Charlton Athletic (16 games)
- Longest losing run: Carlisle United (8 games)
- Highest attendance: 32,583; Derby County vs Bolton Wanderers (16 March 2024)
- Lowest attendance: 2,247; Burton Albion vs Carlisle United (27 February 2024)
- Total attendance: 4,406,968
- Average attendance: 9,539
- All statistics correct as of 12 March 2024.

The 2023–24 EFL League One (referred to as the Sky Bet League One for sponsorship purposes) was the 20th season of the EFL League One under its current title and the 32nd season under its current league division format. The season began on 5 August 2023 and ended on 27 April 2024.

== Team changes ==
The following teams have changed division since the 2022–23 season:

=== To League One ===
Promoted from League Two

- Leyton Orient
- Stevenage
- Northampton Town
- Carlisle United

Relegated from the Championship

- Reading
- Blackpool
- Wigan Athletic

=== From League One ===
Promoted to the Championship

- Plymouth Argyle
- Ipswich Town
- Sheffield Wednesday

Relegated to League Two

- Forest Green Rovers
- Accrington Stanley
- Milton Keynes Dons
- Morecambe

== Stadiums ==
Locations of the 2023–24 EFL League One teams

| Team | Location | Stadium | Capacity |
|---|---|---|---|
| Barnsley | Barnsley | Oakwell | 23,287 |
| Blackpool | Blackpool | Bloomfield Road | 16,616 |
| Bolton Wanderers | Horwich | Toughsheet Community Stadium | 28,723 |
| Bristol Rovers | Bristol | Memorial Stadium | 9,832 |
| Burton Albion | Burton upon Trent | Pirelli Stadium | 6,912 |
| Cambridge United | Cambridge | Abbey Stadium | 8,127 |
| Carlisle United | Carlisle | Brunton Park | 17,949 |
| Charlton Athletic | London (Charlton) | The Valley | 27,111 |
| Cheltenham Town | Cheltenham | Whaddon Road | 7,066 |
| Derby County | Derby | Pride Park Stadium | 32,956 |
| Exeter City | Exeter | St. James Park | 8,720 |
| Fleetwood Town | Fleetwood | Highbury Stadium | 5,327 |
| Leyton Orient | London (Leyton) | Brisbane Road | 9,271 |
| Lincoln City | Lincoln | Sincil Bank | 10,669 |
| Northampton Town | Northampton | Sixfields Stadium | 7,798 |
| Oxford United | Oxford | Kassam Stadium | 12,500 |
| Peterborough United | Peterborough | London Road | 13,511 |
| Portsmouth | Portsmouth | Fratton Park | 20,899 |
| Port Vale | Burslem | Vale Park | 15,036 |
| Reading | Reading | Madejski Stadium | 24,161 |
| Shrewsbury Town | Shrewsbury | New Meadow | 9,875 |
| Stevenage | Stevenage | Broadhall Way | 7,300 |
| Wigan Athletic | Wigan | DW Stadium | 25,138 |
| Wycombe Wanderers | High Wycombe | Adams Park | 10,137 |

== Personnel and sponsoring ==
| Team | Manager | Captain | Kit manufacturer | Sponsor |
|---|---|---|---|---|
| Barnsley | (Republic of Ireland) Martin Devaney (interim) | (England) Jordan Williams | (Germany) Puma | US Mobile |
| Blackpool | (England) Neil Critchley | (Grenada) Oliver Norburn | (Germany) Puma | LeoVegas |
| Bolton Wanderers | (England) Ian Evatt | (Portugal) Ricardo Santos | (Italy) Macron | Victorian Plumbing |
| Bristol Rovers | (England) Matt Taylor | (England) Sam Finley | (Italy) Macron | Utilita |
| Burton Albion | (Northern Ireland) Martin Paterson | (England) John Brayford | (England) TAG | Prestec UK Ltd |
| Cambridge United | (England) Garry Monk | (England) Michael Morrison | (England) Umbro | Brewboard |
| Carlisle United | (England) Paul Simpson | (England) Paul Huntington | (England) Umbro | Bimson Haulage |
| Charlton Athletic | (Wales) Nathan Jones | (England) George Dobson | (England) Castore | RSK Group (Home & Third); University of Greenwich (Away) |
| Cheltenham Town | (England) Darrell Clarke | (Republic of Ireland) Sean Long | (Italy) Erreà | Mira Showers |
| Derby County | (England) Paul Warne | (Republic of Ireland) Conor Hourihane | (England) Umbro | Host & Stay |
| Exeter City | (Scotland) Gary Caldwell | (England) Will Aimson | (Germany) Adidas | Hel Performance (Home & Away); Exeter City Supporters' Trust (Third) |
| Fleetwood Town | (Scotland) Charlie Adam | (England) Brendan Wiredu | (Germany) Puma | BES Utilities |
| Leyton Orient | (England) Richie Wellens | (England) Darren Pratley | (Germany) Puma | Eastdil Secured |
| Lincoln City | (England) Michael Skubala | (Republic of Ireland) Paudie O'Connor | (England) Oxen | Branston (Home); University of Lincoln (Away & Third) |
| Northampton Town | (Australia) Jon Brady | (England) Jon Guthrie | (Germany) Puma | University of Northampton |
| Oxford United | (England) Des Buckingham | (England) Elliott Moore | (Italy) Macron | Bangkok Glass |
| Peterborough United | (Scotland) Darren Ferguson | (England) Harrison Burrows | (Germany) Puma | Mick George Group |
| Portsmouth | (England) John Mousinho | (England) Marlon Pack | (United States) Nike | University of Portsmouth |
| Port Vale | (Jamaica) Darren Moore | (England) Nathan Smith | (Germany) Puma | Synectics Solutions |
| Reading | (Spain) Rubén Sellés | (Ghana) Andy Yiadom | (Italy) Macron | Select Car Leasing |
| Shrewsbury Town | (England) Paul Hurst | (Jamaica) Chey Dunkley | (England) Umbro | Morris Property (Home); Shropshire Homes (Away) |
| Stevenage | (England) Alex Revell (interim) | (England) Carl Piergianni | (Italy) Macron | GRILLA |
| Wigan Athletic | (Scotland) Shaun Maloney | (Northern Ireland) Josh Magennis | (Germany) Puma | Smurfit Kappa Group |
| Wycombe Wanderers | (England) Matt Bloomfield | (Wales) Joe Jacobson | (Denmark) Hummel | Origin Doors & Windows |

== Managerial changes ==
| Team | Outgoing manager | Manner of departure | Date of vacancy | Position in the table | Incoming manager | Date of appointment |
|---|---|---|---|---|---|---|
| Blackpool | (Scotland) Stephen Dobbie | End of interim spell | 8 May 2023 | Pre-season | (England) Neil Critchley | 23 May 2023 |
| Reading | (Republic of Ireland) Noel Hunt | End of interim spell | 8 May 2023 | Pre-season | (Spain) Rubén Sellés | 26 June 2023 |
| Shrewsbury Town | (England) Steve Cotterill | Resigned | 6 June 2023 | Pre-season | (England) Matt Taylor | 26 June 2023 |
| Barnsley | (Northern Ireland) Michael Duff | Signed by Swansea City | 22 June 2023 | Pre-season | (Scotland) Neill Collins | 6 July 2023 |
| Charlton Athletic | (England) Dean Holden | Sacked | 27 August 2023 | 19th | (England) Michael Appleton | 8 September 2023 |
| Fleetwood Town | (Scotland) Scott Brown | Sacked | 3 September 2023 | 23rd | (England) Lee Johnson | 10 September 2023 |
| Cheltenham Town | (England) Wade Elliott | Mutual consent | 20 September 2023 | 24th | (England) Darrell Clarke | 29 September 2023 |
| Lincoln City | (Republic of Ireland) Mark Kennedy | Sacked | 18 October 2023 | 16th | (England) Michael Skubala | 13 November 2023 |
| Bristol Rovers | (England) Joey Barton | Sacked | 26 October 2023 | 16th | (England) Matt Taylor | 1 December 2023 |
| Oxford United | (England) Liam Manning | Signed by Bristol City | 7 November 2023 | 2nd | (England) Des Buckingham | 16 November 2023 |
| Cambridge United | (England) Mark Bonner | Sacked | 29 November 2023 | 18th | (England) Neil Harris | 6 December 2023 |
| Burton Albion | (Tunisia) Dino Maamria | Sacked | 9 December 2023 | 19th | (Northern Ireland) Martin Paterson | 11 January 2024 |
| Fleetwood Town | (England) Lee Johnson | Sacked | 30 December 2023 | 23rd | (Scotland) Charlie Adam | 31 December 2023 |
| Shrewsbury Town | (England) Matt Taylor | Sacked | 21 January 2024 | 19th | (England) Paul Hurst | 24 January 2024 |
| Charlton Athletic | (England) Michael Appleton | Sacked | 23 January 2024 | 16th | (Wales) Nathan Jones | 4 February 2024 |
| Port Vale | (England) Andy Crosby | Sacked | 5 February 2024 | 20th | (Jamaica) Darren Moore | 13 February 2024 |
| Cambridge United | (England) Neil Harris | Signed by Millwall | 21 February 2024 | 17th | (England) Garry Monk | 4 March 2024 |
| Stevenage | (Scotland) Steve Evans | Signed by Rotherham United | 17 April 2024 | 9th | (England) Alex Revell (interim) | 17 April 2024 |
| Barnsley | (Scotland) Neill Collins | Sacked | 22 April 2024 | 5th | (Republic of Ireland) Martin Devaney (interim) | 22 April 2024 |

== League table ==
| Pos | Team | Pld | W | D | L | GF | GA | GD | Pts | Promotion, qualification or relegation |
|---|---|---|---|---|---|---|---|---|---|---|
| 1 | Portsmouth (C, P) | 46 | 28 | 13 | 5 | 78 | 41 | +37 | 97 | Promotion to EFL Championship |
| 2 | Derby County (P) | 46 | 28 | 8 | 10 | 78 | 37 | +41 | 92 | Promotion to EFL Championship |
| 3 | Bolton Wanderers | 46 | 25 | 12 | 9 | 86 | 51 | +35 | 87 | Qualification for League One play-offs |
| 4 | Peterborough United | 46 | 25 | 9 | 12 | 89 | 61 | +28 | 84 | Qualification for League One play-offs |
| 5 | Oxford United (O, P) | 46 | 22 | 11 | 13 | 79 | 56 | +23 | 77 | Qualification for League One play-offs |
| 6 | Barnsley | 46 | 21 | 13 | 12 | 82 | 64 | +18 | 76 | Qualification for League One play-offs |
| 7 | Lincoln City | 46 | 20 | 14 | 12 | 65 | 40 | +25 | 74 | |
| 8 | Blackpool | 46 | 21 | 10 | 15 | 65 | 48 | +17 | 73 | |
| 9 | Stevenage | 46 | 19 | 14 | 13 | 57 | 46 | +11 | 71 | |
| 10 | Wycombe Wanderers | 46 | 17 | 14 | 15 | 60 | 55 | +5 | 65 | |
| 11 | Leyton Orient | 46 | 18 | 11 | 17 | 53 | 55 | −2 | 65 | |
| 12 | Wigan Athletic | 46 | 20 | 10 | 16 | 63 | 56 | +7 | 62 (Note: On 19 May 2023, Wigan Athletic were deducted four points for failing to pay players and staff on time following previous EFL rules breaches in the 2022–23 season. Another four-point deduction was applied on 26 May, after the club's owners missed a deadline to deposit an amount equalling 125% of its monthly wage bill.) | |
| 13 | Exeter City | 46 | 17 | 10 | 19 | 46 | 61 | −15 | 61 | |
| 14 | Northampton Town | 46 | 17 | 9 | 20 | 57 | 66 | −9 | 60 | |
| 15 | Bristol Rovers | 46 | 16 | 9 | 21 | 52 | 68 | −16 | 57 | |
| 16 | Charlton Athletic | 46 | 11 | 20 | 15 | 64 | 65 | −1 | 53 | |
| 17 | Reading | 46 | 16 | 11 | 19 | 68 | 70 | −2 | 53 (Note: On 16 August 2023, Reading were deducted one point for failing to pay players on time and in full on three occasions in the 2022–23 season. Another 3-point deduction was applied on 13 September, for failing to deposit wages on time. Another 2-point deduction was applied on 27 February, due to late HMRC payments.) | |
| 18 | Cambridge United | 46 | 12 | 12 | 22 | 39 | 61 | −22 | 48 | |
| 19 | Shrewsbury Town | 46 | 13 | 9 | 24 | 35 | 67 | −32 | 48 | |
| 20 | Burton Albion | 46 | 12 | 10 | 24 | 39 | 67 | −28 | 46 | |
| 21 | Cheltenham Town (R) | 46 | 12 | 8 | 26 | 41 | 65 | −24 | 44 | Relegation to EFL League Two |
| 22 | Fleetwood Town (R) | 46 | 10 | 13 | 23 | 49 | 72 | −23 | 43 | Relegation to EFL League Two |
| 23 | Port Vale (R) | 46 | 10 | 11 | 25 | 41 | 74 | −33 | 41 | Relegation to EFL League Two |
| 24 | Carlisle United (R) | 46 | 7 | 9 | 30 | 41 | 81 | −40 | 30 | Relegation to EFL League Two |

Source: EFL Official Website
Rules for classification: 1) Points; 2) Goal difference; 3) Number of goals scored; 4) Head-to-head results; 5) Wins; 6) Away goals; 7) Penalty points (sec 9.5); 8) 12-point sending off offences
(C) Champions; (O) Play-off winners; (P) Promoted; (R) Relegated

== Play-offs ==
Semi-finals
6 | Barnsley | 1 | 3 | 4
3 | Bolton Wanderers | 3 | 2 | 5
5 | Oxford United | 1 | 1 | 2
4 | Peterborough United | 0 | 1 | 1

Final
3 | Bolton Wanderers | 0
5 | Oxford United | 2

First leg

3 May 2024
19:30

| Barnsley | 1–3 | Bolton Wanderers |
|---|---|---|
| Cosgrove 76' | Report | Charles 23', 53' (pen.); Williams 90+4' |

Oakwell, Barnsley
Attendance: 13,846
Referee: Will Finnie
4 May 2024
19:45

| Oxford United | 1–0 | Peterborough United |
|---|---|---|
| Moore 53' | Report |

Kassam Stadium, Oxford
Attendance: 11,125
Referee: Lewis Smith

Second leg

7 May 2024
20:00

| Bolton Wanderers | 2–3 | Barnsley |
|---|---|---|
| Collins 43'; Toal 45+1' | Report | Cosgrove 36', 76'; Phillips 64' |

Toughsheet Community Stadium, Horwich
Attendance: 24,518
Referee: Oliver Langford

Bolton Wanderers won 5–4 on aggregate.

8 May 2024
20:00

| Peterborough United | 1–1 | Oxford United |
|---|---|---|
| Knight 41' | Report | Brannagan 45+3' (pen.) |

London Road, Peterborough
Attendance: 12,420
Referee: Andrew Kitchen

Oxford United won 2–1 on aggregate.

=== Final ===
18 May 2024
16:15 BST

| Bolton Wanderers | 0–2 | Oxford United |
|---|---|---|
| | Report | Murphy 31', 42' |

Wembley Stadium, London
Attendance: 70,472
Referee: Sam Barrott

== Results ==
| Home \ Away | BAR | BLA | BOL | BRI | BRT | CAM | CAR | CHA | CHE | DER | EXE | FLE | LEY | LIN | NOR | OXF | PET | POR | PVL | REA | SHR | STE | WIG | WYC |
|---|---|---|---|---|---|---|---|---|---|---|---|---|---|---|---|---|---|---|---|---|---|---|---|---|
| Barnsley | — | 0–1 | 2–2 | 2–1 | 2–0 | 0–2 | 2–1 | 1–1 | 0–0 | 2–1 | 1–2 | 2–2 | 2–1 | 1–5 | 1–1 | 1–3 | 1–3 | 2–3 | 7–0 | 2–2 | 3–0 | 2–1 | 1–1 | 1–0 |
| Blackpool | 3–2 | — | 4–1 | 3–1 | 2–0 | 1–0 | 3–0 | 1–1 | 3–2 | 1–3 | 2–0 | 1–0 | 0–0 | 2–0 | 1–2 | 1–1 | 2–4 | 0–0 | 0–0 | 4–1 | 4–0 | 3–0 | 2–1 | 0–0 |
| Bolton Wanderers | 1–1 | 1–0 | — | 1–2 | 1–0 | 2–0 | 1–3 | 3–3 | 1–0 | 2–1 | 7–0 | 3–1 | 3–2 | 3–0 | 2–1 | 5–0 | 1–1 | 1–1 | 2–0 | 5–2 | 2–2 | 3–2 | 0–4 | 2–1 |
| Bristol Rovers | 1–1 | 1–2 | 0–2 | — | 1–2 | 1–0 | 2–1 | 2–1 | 1–1 | 0–3 | 0–1 | 0–2 | 1–1 | 1–1 | 2–1 | 3–1 | 0–2 | 2–1 | 3–0 | 0–2 | 0–0 | 1–1 | 4–1 | 1–2 |
| Burton Albion | 1–3 | 1–0 | 1–1 | 4–1 | — | 2–1 | 0–1 | 2–0 | 1–2 | 0–3 | 0–1 | 1–1 | 0–0 | 0–1 | 0–2 | 0–4 | 1–3 | 0–2 | 0–1 | 3–2 | 1–0 | 1–2 | 2–1 | 1–1 |
| Cambridge United | 0–4 | 2–1 | 1–2 | 2–0 | 0–0 | — | 1–0 | 1–1 | 0–1 | 0–1 | 2–0 | 2–1 | 0–2 | 0–3 | 1–1 | 2–0 | 0–1 | 0–0 | 1–1 | 1–0 | 1–1 | 1–2 | 3–1 | 1–1 |
| Carlisle United | 2–3 | 0–1 | 1–4 | 0–1 | 2–1 | 0–4 | — | 1–1 | 0–1 | 0–2 | 0–2 | 1–1 | 0–1 | 1–3 | 2–2 | 1–3 | 1–1 | 0–1 | 2–1 | 1–3 | 2–0 | 2–2 | 1–1 | 1–3 |
| Charlton Athletic | 2–1 | 2–2 | 0–2 | 1–2 | 1–1 | 2–2 | 3–2 | — | 2–1 | 0–1 | 4–1 | 2–1 | 1–0 | 1–1 | 2–3 | 1–2 | 1–2 | 0–0 | 2–3 | 4–0 | 1–1 | 0–0 | 2–2 | 3–1 |
| Cheltenham Town | 0–2 | 2–0 | 0–3 | 1–3 | 0–0 | 1–0 | 0–1 | 1–3 | — | 1–1 | 1–2 | 0–2 | 1–2 | 1–2 | 0–1 | 2–0 | 2–0 | 2–1 | 3–2 | 2–2 | 2–0 | 0–3 | 1–1 | 1–3 |
| Derby County | 3–0 | 1–0 | 1–0 | 2–1 | 3–2 | 0–0 | 2–0 | 1–2 | 2–1 | — | 2–0 | 1–0 | 3–0 | 3–1 | 4–0 | 1–2 | 2–3 | 1–1 | 3–0 | 2–1 | 1–1 | 1–0 | 1–2 | 1–1 |
| Exeter City | 0–1 | 0–0 | 2–2 | 0–1 | 1–0 | 0–0 | 2–1 | 1–1 | 1–0 | 0–3 | — | 1–1 | 1–2 | 1–1 | 0–2 | 1–2 | 2–1 | 0–0 | 0–1 | 2–1 | 0–0 | 1–0 | 0–2 | 1–0 |
| Fleetwood Town | 1–2 | 3–3 | 0–2 | 0–0 | 3–0 | 0–2 | 1–1 | 1–1 | 1–2 | 1–3 | 3–0 | — | 1–0 | 0–1 | 2–0 | 0–3 | 0–1 | 0–1 | 3–0 | 1–1 | 0–1 | 0–3 | 4–2 | 1–4 |
| Leyton Orient | 1–1 | 1–0 | 1–0 | 0–1 | 1–2 | 2–0 | 3–2 | 1–0 | 3–1 | 0–3 | 2–2 | 0–1 | — | 0–1 (Note: On 3 October, the original fixture was abandoned in the 84th minute, due to a fatality in the crowd. On 16 October, the EFL announced that the game will be replayed in full) | 4–3 | 2–3 | 1–2 | 0–4 | 0–0 | 2–1 | 1–0 | 0–3 | 1–1 | 0–0 |
| Lincoln City | 2–2 | 3–0 | 0–1 | 5–0 | 0–1 | 6–0 | 1–1 | 3–1 | 2–0 | 0–0 | 1–0 | 2–1 | 1–0 | — | 1–2 | 0–2 | 0–0 | 0–2 | 1–1 | 1–1 | 3–0 | 0–0 | 1–2 | 3–0 |
| Northampton Town | 1–2 | 0–1 | 1–1 | 3–1 | 2–0 | 2–1 | 2–0 | 1–1 | 1–0 | 1–0 | 1–2 | 3–0 | 2–2 | 2–2 | — | 2–1 | 1–0 | 0–3 | 2–0 | 3–1 | 0–2 | 0–1 | 1–1 | 0–1 |
| Oxford United | 0–1 | 1–1 | 0–0 | 2–1 | 3–0 | 2–1 | 1–0 | 2–1 | 2–1 | 2–3 | 3–0 | 4–0 | 1–2 | 0–1 | 2–2 | — | 5–0 | 2–2 | 1–2 | 1–1 | 3–0 | 1–1 | 4–2 | 2–2 |
| Peterborough United | 2–2 | 1–2 | 3–3 | 2–0 | 4–0 | 5–0 | 1–3 | 1–0 | 3–0 | 2–4 | 2–1 | 4–1 | 1–1 | 2–0 | 5–1 | 3–0 | — | 0–1 | 3–0 | 2–2 | 2–1 | 3–1 | 2–3 | 2–2 |
| Portsmouth | 3–2 | 0–4 | 2–0 | 1–1 | 2–1 | 3–1 | 1–0 | 2–2 | 0–0 | 2–2 | 1–0 | 1–1 | 0–3 | 2–1 | 4–1 | 2–1 | 3–1 | — | 2–0 | 4–1 | 3–1 | 2–1 | 1–2 | 2–1 |
| Port Vale | 2–3 | 3–0 | 0–1 | 2–0 | 2–3 | 0–0 | 1–0 | 3–3 | 1–2 | 0–1 | 2–4 | 2–2 | 0–1 | 0–2 | 1–0 | 0–2 | 0–1 | 0–1 | — | 1–0 | 1–2 | 2–2 | 3–2 | 1–2 |
| Reading | 1–3 | 3–2 | 2–1 | 1–1 | 0–0 | 4–0 | 5–1 | 2–0 | 1–0 | 1–0 | 3–2 | 1–2 | 1–1 | 1–1 | 1–0 | 1–1 | 0–1 | 2–3 | 2–0 | — | 2–3 | 2–0 | 2–0 | 1–2 |
| Shrewsbury Town | 1–1 | 0–2 | 0–2 | 0–2 | 2–1 | 1–2 | 1–0 | 0–0 | 1–0 | 1–0 | 0–3 | 3–1 | 1–3 | 0–1 | 1–0 | 1–1 | 1–2 | 0–3 | 2–1 | 3–2 | — | 0–1 | 0–1 | 0–2 |
| Stevenage | 2–1 | 1–0 | 0–0 | 2–3 | 1–2 | 1–0 | 2–2 | 1–1 | 2–1 | 3–1 | 1–1 | 0–0 | 0–1 | 1–0 | 3–0 | 1–3 | 2–2 | 0–0 | 0–0 | 0–1 | 2–0 | — | 1–0 | 1–0 |
| Wigan Athletic | 0–2 | 1–0 | 1–0 | 2–0 | 1–1 | 2–1 | 2–0 | 2–3 | 1–1 | 0–1 | 1–2 | 3–0 | 1–0 | 0–0 | 2–1 | 2–0 | 2–1 | 1–2 | 0–0 | 1–0 | 2–0 | 2–3 | — | 1–0 |
| Wycombe Wanderers | 2–4 | 2–0 | 2–4 | 3–2 | 0–0 | 0–0 | 2–0 | 1–0 | 2–0 | 0–0 | 0–3 | 2–2 | 3–2 | 1–1 | 2–0 | 0–0 | 5–2 | 1–3 | 1–1 | 1–2 | 0–1 | 0–1 | 1–0 | — |

Legend: Blue = home team win; Yellow = draw; Red = away team win.
For upcoming matches, an "a" indicates there is an article about the rivalry between the two participants.

== Season statistics ==
As of 27 April 2024

=== Top scorers ===
| Rank | Player | Club | Goals |
|---|---|---|---|
| 1 | (England) Alfie May | Charlton Athletic | 23 |
| 2 | (England) Colby Bishop | Portsmouth | 21 |
| 3 | (England) Devante Cole | Barnsley | 18 |
| 3 | (Northern Ireland) Jamie Reid | Stevenage | 18 |
| 5 | (Scotland) Chris Martin | Bristol Rovers | 16 |
| 6 | (England) Sam Hoskins | Northampton Town | 15 |
| 6 | (England) Sam Smith | Reading | 15 |
| 6 | (Wales) Mark Harris | Oxford United | 15 |
| 6 | (Scotland) Jordan Rhodes | Blackpool | 15 |
| 10 | (Northern Ireland) Dion Charles | Bolton Wanderers | 14 |
| 10 | (Republic of Ireland) James Collins | Derby County | 14 |
| 10 | (Jamaica) Ephron Mason-Clark | Peterborough United | 14 |

=== Hat-tricks ===
| Player | For | Against | Score | Date | Ref |
|---|---|---|---|---|---|
| (England) Devante Cole | Barnsley | Port Vale | 7–0 | 5 August 2023 | |
| (Nigeria) Victor Adeboyejo | Bolton Wanderers | Fleetwood Town | 3–1 | 15 August 2023 | |
| (England) Martyn Waghorn | Derby County | Peterborough United | 4–2 | 26 August 2023 | |
| (Scotland) Jordan Rhodes | Blackpool | Reading | 4–1 | 23 September 2023 | |
| (England) Jordan Gibson | Carlisle United | Bolton Wanderers | 3–1 | 7 October 2023 | |
| (South Africa) Ethan Chislett | Port Vale | Wigan Athletic | 3–2 | 16 December 2023 | |
| (Wales) Joe Taylor | Lincoln City | Bristol Rovers | 5–0 | 16 March 2024 | |
| (England) Jon Mellish | Carlisle United | Peterborough United | 1–3 | 29 March 2024 | |
| (Wales) Aaron Collins | Bolton Wanderers | Reading | 5–2 | 1 April 2024 | |

== Discipline ==
=== Yellow cards ===
- Most yellow cards: 14
  - (England) George Thomason (Bolton Wanderers)
  - (England) Josh Vela (Carlisle United/Fleetwood Town)

=== Red cards ===
- Most red cards: 3
  - (England) Steve Seddon (Burton Albion)

=== Club ===
- Most yellow cards: 125
  (Wigan Athletic)
- Fewest yellow cards: 63
  (Peterborough United)
- Most red cards: 9
  (Fleetwood Town)
- Fewest red cards: 1
  (Charlton Athletic, Northampton Town, Peterborough United)

== Awards ==
=== Monthly ===
| Month | Manager of the Month | | Player of the Month | | Reference |
|---|---|---|---|---|---|
| August | (England) Liam Manning | Oxford United | (England) Charlie Wyke | Wigan Athletic | |
| September | (England) John Mousinho | Portsmouth | (Jamaica) Greg Leigh | Oxford United | |
| October | (England) Ian Evatt | Bolton Wanderers | (England) Alfie May | Charlton Athletic | |
| November | (England) Ian Evatt | Bolton Wanderers | (England) Sam Hoskins | Northampton Town | |
| December | (England) Paul Warne | Derby County | (England) Herbie Kane | Barnsley | |
| January | (England) Richie Wellens | Leyton Orient | (Scotland) Chris Martin | Bristol Rovers | |
| February | (England) John Mousinho | Portsmouth | (England) Adam Phillips | Barnsley | |
| March | (England) Paul Warne | Derby County | (Wales) Joe Taylor | Lincoln City | |
| April | (England) Matt Bloomfield | Wycombe Wanderers | (Wales) Mark Harris | Oxford United | |

== Attendances ==
Derby County drew the highest average home attendance in the 2023–24 edition of the EFL League One.

| # | Football club | Home games | Average attendance |
|---|---|---|---|
| 1 | Derby County | 23 | 27,278 |
| 2 | Bolton Wanderers | 23 | 21,036 |
| 3 | Portsmouth FC | 23 | 18,953 |
| 4 | Charlton Athletic | 23 | 13,481 |
| 5 | Reading FC | 23 | 13,115 |
| 6 | Barnsley FC | 23 | 12,680 |
| 7 | Blackpool FC | 23 | 10,667 |
| 8 | Wigan Athletic | 23 | 10,442 |
| 9 | Oxford United | 23 | 9,021 |
| 10 | Peterborough United | 23 | 8,845 |
| 11 | Lincoln City | 23 | 8,424 |
| 12 | Bristol Rovers | 23 | 8,190 |
| 13 | Leyton Orient | 23 | 8,162 |
| 14 | Carlisle United | 23 | 8,000 |
| 15 | Northampton Town | 23 | 6,842 |
| 16 | Exeter City | 23 | 6,800 |
| 17 | Cambridge United | 23 | 6,679 |
| 18 | Port Vale | 23 | 6,600 |
| 19 | Shrewsbury Town | 23 | 6,361 |
| 20 | Wycombe Wanderers | 23 | 4,980 |
| 21 | Stevenage FC | 23 | 4,835 |
| 22 | Cheltenham Town | 23 | 4,609 |
| 23 | Fleetwood Town | 23 | 3,430 |
| 24 | Burton Albion | 23 | 3,419 |
