= Fylde Coast derby =

Football rivalry in Lancashire, England

- Location: The Fylde
- Teams: Blackpool FC; Fleetwood Town
- First meeting: Blackpool 4–0 Fleetwood; 22 November 1980; FA Cup
- Latest meeting: Blackpool 1–0 Fleetwood; 9 April 2024; League One
- Next meeting: TBC
- Stadiums: Bloomfield Road (Blackpool); Highbury Stadium (Fleetwood Town)

Statistics
- Total meetings: 15
- Top scorer: Matt Phillips (3 goals)
- All-time record: Blackpool: 8 Draw: 6 Fleetwood: 1

The Fylde Coast derby is the name given to the regional football rivalry between the two Football League clubs situated in the Fylde Coast area of Lancashire – Blackpool and Fleetwood Town, first contested in 1980. Blackpool play at Bloomfield Road while Fleetwood play at Highbury Stadium, the two grounds separated by 8.5 miles (13.7 km).

The rivalry between Blackpool and Fleetwood Town started very recently, dating back to 2015–16 Football League One, after Blackpool were relegated from 2014–15 Football League Championship. As of the end of the 2023-2024 season, the two clubs have met a total of 15 times in all competitions, with Blackpool winning eight games compared to Fleetwood's solitary victory.

== All-time results ==
=== League ===
Date	Venue	Score	Competition	Attendance
28 November 2015	Bloomfield Road	1–0	EFL League One	7,755
23 April 2016	Highbury Stadium	0–0	EFL League One	5,123
25 November 2017	Highbury Stadium	0–0	EFL League One	5,035
18 April 2018	Bloomfield Road	2–1	EFL League One	7,371
27 October 2018	Highbury Stadium	3–2	EFL League One	5,035
22 April 2019	Bloomfield Road	2–1	EFL League One	11,713
7 December 2019	Bloomfield Road	3–1	EFL League One	10,355
7 March 2020	Highbury Stadium	0–0	EFL League One	4,884
5 December 2020	Highbury Stadium	0–1	EFL League One	N/A
14 March 2021	Bloomfield Road	0–0	EFL League One	N/A
1 November 2023	Highbury Stadium	3–3	EFL League One	4,852
9 April 2024	Bloomfield Road	1-0	EFL League One	10,845

=== Cups ===
Date	Venue	Score	Competition	Attendance
22 November 1980	Bloomfield Road	4–0	FA Cup	10,897
7 January 2012	Highbury Stadium	1–5	FA Cup	5,092
8 December 2020	Highbury Stadium	0–0	EFL Trophy	N/A

== Crossing the Divide ==
The following players have played for both clubs in the EFL and/or affiliated Cup competitions such as the FA Cup, Football League Cup or EFL Trophy.

Played for Both

- Tom Barkhuizen
- Peter Clarke
- Phil Clarkson
- Callum Connolly
- Stephen Crainey
- Stephen Dobbie
- Ashley Eastham
- Rob Edwards
- Ryan Edwards
- Barry Ferguson MBE
- Matt Gilks
- Bobby Grant
- Bob Harris
- Ben Heneghan
- Luke Higham
- James Husband
- Chris Long
- Andy Mangan
- Jamille Matt
- Chris Maxwell
- Jamie Milligan
- Martin Paterson
- Jimmy Ryan
- Keith Southern
- Nathan Tyson
- Kyle Vassell

Other Connections

The following players have either managed both, played for one or managed the other or been on the coaching staff of one or both clubs.

- Charlie Adam
- Phil Clarkson
- Ciaran Donnelly
- Simon Grayson
- John Hills
- Andy Lyons
- Craig Madden
- Micky Mellon
- Simon Wiles
