= Ciaran Donnelly =

Ciaran Donnelly may refer to:

- Ciaran Donnelly (footballer)
- Ciarán Donnelly (director)
