= 2008–09 Reading F.C. season =

Reading F.C.
2008–09 season
- Chairman: John Madejski
- Manager: Steve Coppell
- Championship: 4th (play off Semi-Finals)
- FA Cup: Third round vs Cardiff City
- League Cup: Third round vs Stoke City
- Top goalscorer: League: Kevin Doyle 18; All: Kevin Doyle 18
- Highest home attendance: 23,121 vs Southampton (22 November 2008)
- Lowest home attendance: 16,514 vs Blackpool (9 December 2008)
Home colours	Away colours	Third colours

Reading Football Club played the 2008–09 season in the Football League Championship, having been relegated on the final day of the 2007–08 Premier League season. Despite a strong start to the season, especially at home, Reading were unable to secure promotion at the first attempt; a poor run of form in 2009 saw Reading win just 5 of their last 17 league games, the Royals finishing 4th in the league. Reading were defeated 3–0 on aggregate by Burnley in the play-off semi-finals.

== Review and events ==
=== Pre-season ===
Reading opened their pre-season with an away game against Didcot Town, winning 9–0, with nine different scorers, including a fan who won the opportunity to play at a charity auction. After further away wins at Forest Green Rovers (2–0), Havant & Waterlooville (1–0) and MK Dons (2–1), Reading went on a three-game friendly tour of Sweden, winning their three games against FC Trollhättan (4–1) in which Leroy Lita scored all four, against Lerkils IF (1–0) and against Halmstads BK (3–1) in which new signing Noel Hunt scored for the first time, ultimately scoring two. Reading's last friendly, and only home friendly, was against Aston Villa, and finished 1–1. It was Reading's only pre-season game that they did not win.

=== August ===
Reading's league campaign began with a 0–0 draw at promoted Nottingham Forest. In a game of few chances, Kevin Doyle came closest for the Royals, glancing a header goalwards from a Stephen Hunt cross, that Forest goalkeeper Paul Smith did well to tip on to the crossbar.

Two days later, the Royals enjoyed their first victory of the season, as a late Noel Hunt goal, on his competitive debut for Reading, secured a 2–1 victory at Dagenham and Redbridge in the 1st round of the League Cup. James Henry had opened the scoring for Reading in the first half, with his first goal for the club, tapping home after Shane Long had beaten the Dagenham goalkeeper to a cross.

Reading's first home league match followed on 16 August, a game the Royals deservedly won 2–0, Ibrahima Sonko crashing home two headers, one in each half, both from Stephen Hunt corners.

A week later, the Royals lost a thrilling game 2–4 against Charlton Athletic. Matt Holland and Andy Gray's penalty gave the Addicks a 2–0 lead but Ibrahima Sonko kept up his scoring form with a thumping header before half-time. Stephen Hunt's retaken penalty completed the comeback for Reading, but further goals for Luke Varney and Hamer Bouazza gave Charlton all three points.

The Royals returned to the Madesjki on 26 August with a thumping 5–1 victory over Luton Town in the League Cup 2nd Round. Noel Hunt opened the scoring after nodding in brother Stephen Hunt's cross. Soon later it was the other way around, Noel Hunt sliding in a cross and Stephen Hunt slotted home. Alex Pearce, Jem Karacan and James Henry all got their first goals for the club. A consolation for Luton was scored by Ryan Charles.

=== September ===
The month started at Portman Road, Ipswich. Reading's bad away form continued as The Royals lost 2–0 to the hands of Ipswich Town. The game was followed up by the biggest win of the season, so far, as Reading forced six passed Sheffield Wednesday. The Royals were 2–0 up within 10 minutes, Kevin Doyle scoring them both. André Bikey got the third on the half hour mark. Noel Hunt got the fourth on the fiftieth minute. Doyle scored his third of the game and two minutes later Reading were 6–0 up. It stayed that way until the end of the match.

Watford. Reading came to Watford sitting fourth in the Championship. Reading took the lead on the 13th minute. The goal was scored by no-one! The goal was not claimed for by any Reading player. Watford soon went 2–1 up and an 89th minute spot kick was turned in by S. Hunt.

Reading played a cup side in the League Cup as the Royals headed to Stoke to play the Premier League side Stoke City. Reading battled hard only losing to the Premier League side on spot kicks, 4–3, after a 2–2 draw.

Reading played Swansea City and a 4–0 win set up a game with Wolverhampton Wanderers. The Royals went 1–0 up when an own goal by Wolverhampton Wanderers started off a hammering for Wolves. André Bikey made it 2–0 and Kalifa Cissé made a Reading win a game to forget for Wolverhampton Wanderers.

=== October ===
Burnley came to Reading. Reading won the game 3–1. The Hunt Brothers scored two and Shane Long made it 3–0. Burnley scored a goal, but it was too little to late. Away days. Reading lost to the hands of Preston North End 2–1. Mix ups saw a loss come to Reading's hands.

A home game to Doncaster Rovers followed. The Royals only won 2–1. This happened after Reading going 1–0 up, then Doncaster scored. One minute later the Royals scored to win the match.

A draw to Queens Park Rangers in front of the Sky Sports cameras at home, 0–0, and a loss, 1–0, away to Burnley rounded off a bad month for the Royals, home and away.

=== November ===
Reading returned to winning ways at Ashton Gate as the Royals opened November with a 4–1 win away to Bristol City. Kevin Doyle (twice) and Noel Hunt scored from close range, before Kalifa Cissé added Reading's fourth, smashing the ball into the top right-hand corner of the goal from outside of the penalty area. Reading's excellent home form continued the following weekend, Doyle (2) and Noel Hunt again got on the scoresheet in a 3–0 victory over Derby County.

The Royals secured a third successive victory at Bramall Lane the following weekend, Kalifa Cissé opening the scoring in the 5th minute, before a Kevin Doyle header, just before half-time, completed a 2–0 win at Sheffield United. Reading then lost to Southampton at home 2–1. The Royals' 1st home defeat of the season so-far. Kébé scored his 1st Reading goal. The Royals then headed off to Wales to play Cardiff City. Reading went 1–0 and 2–1 down. At 1–1, Reading were down to 10 men as André Bikey got sent off. Reading's scores were Kevin Doyle and Brynjar Gunnarsson in a 2–2 draw.

=== December ===
Reading were playing Coventry City at home in front of the Sky Sports Cameras. The Royals went 1–0 down, but came back to win 3–1. Reading won 1–0 at Barnsley and at home to Blackpool. A late rally by Reading help them win 2–0 at home to Norwich City. Reading moved into 2nd as Reading won 3–1 at then 2nd place Birmingham City.

Reading then had a home draw, 1–1, to Cardiff City. The Welsh side went 1–0 in the 89th minute, but Reading's keeper Adam Federici scored in the 6th minute of injury time. Reading then drew 1–1 at Southampton.

=== January ===
Reading met Cardiff City for the third time in six weeks in the FA Cup third round, and a largely second-string side were defeated 2–0 at Ninian Park, to end the Royals' eight-match unbeaten run. The Royals returned to the Madejski Stadium for the first league match of the calendar year, completing a 4–0 victory over Watford. Chris Armstrong opened the scoring with his first ever goal for Reading, before Kevin Doyle, Noel Hunt and Leroy Lita, back from Norwich, added to the tally. A 2–0 defeat at Welsh side Swansea City followed, to end a run of 9 league matches unbeaten for Reading, before league leaders Wolves were beaten 1–0 at the Madejski Stadium, the game decided by a second-minute own-goal scored by Wolves' Neill Collins. The result closed the gap between Wolves and Reading, in 2nd place, to two points. January ended with a goalless draw at Loftus Road, as Reading and Q.P.R. drew 0–0 for the second time this season.

=== February ===
On the 6th of the month it was revealed that Bobby Convey had left the club by mutual consent. A second consecutive 0–0 draw followed, as the Royals were held at home by Preston. On 13 February it was revealed that Ivar Ingimarsson would be out injured for the rest of the season, scheduled for surgery on a knee cartilage problem. Reading's goal drought continued two weeks later, at home to Bristol City, as the Royals lost 2–0, a second home defeat of the season. Nottingham Forest visited the Madejski Stadium on 28 February, as the Royals slumped to a second straight home defeat, and a sixth consecutive game without scoring.

=== March ===
Reading secured a first win in five games under floodlights at Hillsborough, defeating Sheffield Wednesday 2–1, Kevin Doyle heading home from a corner, and Shane Long scoring the winner with nine minutes left.

The Royals headed to Home Park, Plymouth to play Plymouth Argyle. Reading went 1–0 down, but Alex Pearce scored two minutes later. Argyle went 2–1 up and in the 80th minute, Jimmy Kebe scored, through the keepers legs.

Reading played Charlton Athletic, at home, next. Reading drew 2–2 with two goals from young Irish striker Shane Long. However the Royals were denied victory by a last gasp equaliser. Reading next lost to Ipswich Town 1–0. The Royals went 1–0 down just 1 minute after the break. That meant the Royals went into a three match winless run with renewed purpose.

However, that was forgotten in midweek as they won 1–0 at Doncaster Rovers, thanks to a late Dave Kitson winner eight minutes from time. Kitson had returned to the club on loan, as did Glen Little.

The Royals ended the month with successive goalless draws, against Crystal Palace, eventually dropping into 4th place after Sheffield United's win over Barnsley.

=== April ===
The first game of April was away to Coventry City which ended in bore draw of 0–0. Both teams creating very little in another disappointing performance from the Royals.

On 10 April 2009, Sheffield United travelled to the Madjeski for an evening game in a real six-pointer with both teams needing the win to help secure that valuable play-off place. It ended in Reading losing 1–0 with Brian Howard scoring a scrappy goal on the hour mark.

On 13 April 2009, the Royals travelled to Bloomfield Road to face Blackpool and after taking a 2–0 lead, eventually drew 2–2. Jem Karacan scored his first goal of the season and league goal for the Royals.

A goalless draw with Barnsley at home meant Reading had now gone 7 home games without a win. However, the Royals showed a return to form on the following Tuesday night with a 2–0 win at Derby County, Dave Kitson and Shane Long the goalscorers.

With results having gone their way at the weekend, Reading went into their Monday night game with Norwich City knowing that only a win would keep their hopes of automatic promotion alive. Shane Long inspired Reading to a 2–0 win with both goals, both of them headers from Jimmy Kebe crosses. Reading, 4th, needed to win going into a clash with Birmingham City, 2nd. Reading lost 2–1 and Birmingham went up. Reading need to win to go up to the Premier League at the first attempt, and Sheffield United didn't win against Crystal Palace. United drew 0–0. If the Royals had won they would have gone up on Goal-Difference.

=== May ===
André Bikey was sent off as Reading lost the first leg of their play-off semi-final at Burnley by a single goal. Bikey was sent off for a stamp on Robbie Blake, minutes after pulling back Burnley striker Steve Thompson to gift the Clarets the winning penalty, scored by Graham Alexander. Burnley advanced to the final at Wembley three days later as Reading lost the second leg 2–0, goals from Martin Paterson, and Thompson, sealing Burnley's win. Hours after Burnley winning the game Steve Coppell resigned as Manager of the club.

== Squad ==
As of match played 12 May 2009

No.	Name	Nationality	Position	Date of birth (age)	Signed from	Signed in	Contract ends	Apps.	Goals
Goalkeepers
1	Marcus Hahnemann	(United States)	GK	15 June 1972 (aged 36)	Fulham	2002		301	0
32	Adam Federici	(Australia)	GK	31 January 1985 (aged 24)	Torres	2005		18	1
36	Mikkel Andersen	(Denmark)	GK	17 December 1988 (aged 20)	AB	2007	2009	0	0
49	Alex McCarthy	(England)	GK	3 December 1989 (aged 19)	Academy	2007		0	0
Defenders
2	Graeme Murty	(Scotland) (Note: Graeme Murty was born in Saltburn-by-the-Sea, North Yorkshire, England, but qualified to represent Scotland internationally through his parents, making his international debut for Scotland in 2004.)	DF	13 November 1974 (aged 34)	York City	1998		339	2
3	Chris Armstrong	(Scotland) (Note: Chris Armstrong was born in Newcastle upon Tyne, England, but qualified to represent Scotland internationally through his grandmother, making his international debut for Scotland B in 2007.)	DF	5 August 1982 (aged 26)	Sheffield United	2008		41	1
16	Ívar Ingimarsson	(Iceland)	DF	20 August 1977 (aged 31)	Wolverhampton Wanderers	2003		235	12
18	Sam Sodje	(Nigeria) (Note: Sam Sodje was born in Greenwich, England, but also qualified to represent Nigeria internationally through his parents and made his international debut for Nigeria in 2004.)	DF	9 April 1981 (aged 28)	Brentford	2006		8	1
19	Liam Rosenior	(England)	DF	9 July 1984 (aged 24)	Fulham	2007	2010	63	1
22	André Bikey	(Cameroon)	DF	8 January 1985 (aged 24)	Lokomotiv Moscow	2007	2010	73	7
25	Alan Bennett	(Republic of Ireland)	DF	4 October 1981 (aged 27)	Cork City	2007		0	0
26	Alex Pearce	(Scotland) (Note: Alex Pearce was born in Wallingford, England, but also qualified to represent Scotland and the Republic of Ireland internationally through his parents and has represented Scotland at youth and U-21 level. He would, however, later be called up and make his full international debut for the Republic of Ireland in September 2012.)	DF	9 November 1988 (aged 20)	Academy	2006		25	2
29	Michael Duberry	(England)	DF	14 October 1975 (aged 33)	Stoke City	2007	2008	54	0
31	Dan Harding	(England)	DF	23 December 1983 (aged 25)	on loan from Ipswich Town	2009	2009	5	0
33	Scott Golbourne	(England)	DF	29 February 1988 (aged 21)	Bristol City	2006		6	0
42	Julian Kelly	(England)	DF	6 September 1989 (aged 19)	Academy	2008		11	0
43	Daniel Spence	(England)	DF	22 October 1989 (aged 19)	Academy	2007		0	0
Midfielders
4	Kalifa Cissé	(Mali) (Note: Kalifa Cissé was born in Dreux, France, but qualified to represent Mali internationally and made his international debut for Mali in March 2008, having previously represented them at U-20 level.)	MF	9 January 1984 (aged 25)	Boavista	2007	2010	64	6
6	Brynjar Gunnarsson	(Iceland)	MF	16 October 1975 (aged 33)	Watford	2005		111	10
7	Marek Matějovský	(Czech Republic)	MF	20 December 1981 (aged 27)	Mladá Boleslav	2008	2011	39	2
10	Stephen Hunt	(Republic of Ireland)	MF	1 August 1981 (aged 27)	Brentford	2005		173	20
14	Jimmy Kébé	(Mali) (Note: Jimmy Kébé was born in Vitry-sur-Seine, France, but qualified to represent Mali internationally and made his international debut for Mali in 2004.)	MF	19 January 1984 (aged 25)	Lens	2008	2010	49	2
15	James Harper	(England)	MF	9 November 1980 (aged 28)	Arsenal	2001		356	23
19	Hal Robson-Kanu	(England) (Note: Hal Robson-Kanu was born in Ealing, England, and represented England at U-19 and U-20 level, but also qualified to represent Wales through his grandmother and made his international debut for the Welsh U-21 side in May 2010 before making his full international debut for Wales five days later.)	MF	21 May 1989 (aged 19)	Academy	2007		0	0
21	Jem Karacan	(Turkey) (Note: Jem Karacan was born in Lewisham, England, but also qualifies to represent Turkey internationally through his father and has represented Turkey at every youth level.)	MF	21 February 1989 (aged 20)	Academy	2007		17	2
27	James Henry	(England) (Note: James Henry was born in Reading, England, but also qualified to represent Scotland internationally through his parents and has represented Scotland at youth level. However, he would later represent England at youth level.)	MF	9 July 1987 (aged 21)	Academy	2004		12	4
28	Michail Antonio	(England) (Note: Michail Antonio was born in Wandsworth, England, but also qualified to represent Jamaica internationally, going on to make his debut for Jamaica in 2021.)	MF	8 January 1989 (aged 20)	Tooting & Mitcham United	2008	2010	0	0
30	Oliver Bozanic	(Australia)	MF	8 January 1989 (aged 20)	Central Coast Mariners	2007	2009	0	0
34	Gylfi Sigurðsson	(Iceland)	MF	8 September 1989 (aged 19)	Academy	2008		3	0
37	Jay Tabb	(Republic of Ireland) (Note: Jay Tabb was born in Tooting, England, but also qualified to represent the Republic of Ireland internationally, and represented Ireland at U-21 level in 2005.)	MF	21 February 1984 (aged 25)	Coventry City	2009	2011	11	0
40	Tom Hateley	(England)	MF	12 September 1989 (aged 19)	Academy	2006		0	0
52	Glen Little	(England)	MF	15 October 1975 (aged 33)	on loan from Portsmouth	2009	2009	123	6
Forwards
8	Leroy Lita	(England) (Note: Leroy Lita was born in Kinshasa, DR Congo, but qualified to represent England, representing England at U-21 level.)	FW	28 December 1984 (aged 24)	Bristol City	2005		100	32
9	Kevin Doyle	(Republic of Ireland)	FW	18 September 1983 (aged 25)	Cork City	2005		163	56
11	Noel Hunt	(Republic of Ireland)	FW	26 December 1982 (aged 26)	Dundee United	2008	2011	39	13
12	Dave Mooney	(Republic of Ireland)	FW	30 October 1984 (aged 24)	Cork City	2008	2011	2	0
17	Dave Kitson	(England)	FW	21 January 1980 (aged 29)	loan from Stoke City	2009	2009	159	62
24	Shane Long	(Republic of Ireland)	FW	22 January 1987 (aged 22)	Cork City	2005		115	18
35	Simon Church	(Wales) (Note: Simon Church was born in High Wycombe, England, but also qualifies to represent Wales through his grandparents and made his international debut for the Welsh U-21 side in August 2007 before making his full international debut for Wales in May 2009.)	FW	10 December 1988 (aged 20)	Academy	2007		2	0
39	Nicholas Bignall	(England)	FW	11 July 1990 (aged 18)	Academy	2008		0	0
Out on loan
38	Scott Davies	(Republic of Ireland) (Note: Scott Davies was born in Aylesbury, England, but also qualified to represent the Republic of Ireland internationally and has represented them at youth and U-21 level.)	MF	9 July 1987 (aged 21)	Academy	2004		0	0
41	Ben Hamer	(England)	GK	20 November 1987 (aged 21)	Academy	2006		0	0
Left during the season
3	Nicky Shorey	(England)	DF	19 February 1981 (aged 28)	Leyton Orient	2001		296	12
17	Bobby Convey	(United States)	MF	27 May 1983 (aged 25)	D.C. United	2004		112	8
20	Emerse Faé	(Ivory Coast) (Note: Emerse Faé was born in Nantes, France and represented them at U-17 and U-21 level, but also qualified to represent the Ivory Coast internationally and made his international debut for Ivory Coast in March 2005.)	MF	24 January 1984 (aged 25)	Nantes	2007	2010 (+1)	11	0
31	Ibrahima Sonko	(Senegal)	DF	22 January 1981 (aged 28)	Brentford	2004		136	8
43	Viktor Illugason	(Iceland)	FW	25 January 1990 (aged 19)	Breiðablik	2007		0	0

=== Out on loan ===
Note: Flags indicate national team as defined under FIFA eligibility rules; some limited exceptions apply. Players may hold more than one non-FIFA nationality.

No. / Pos. / Nation / Player; 38 / MF / IRL / Scott Davies (at Aldershot Town until end of the season)	No. / Pos. / Nation / Player; 41 / GK / ENG / Ben Hamer (at Brentford until end of the season)

=== Left club during season ===
Note: Flags indicate national team as defined under FIFA eligibility rules; some limited exceptions apply. Players may hold more than one non-FIFA nationality.

No.	Pos.	Nation	Player
3	DF	ENG	Nicky Shorey (to Aston Villa)
17	MF	USA	Bobby Convey
20	MF	CIV	Emerse Fae (to OGC Nice)

No.	Pos.	Nation	Player
31	DF	SEN	Ibrahima Sonko (to Stoke City)
37	FW	ISL	Viktor Illugason (to Valur)

== Transfers ==
=== In ===
Date	Position	Nationality	Name	From	Fee	Ref.
23 July 2008	FW	(Republic of Ireland)	Noel Hunt	Dundee United	Undisclosed	
21 August 2008	FW	(Republic of Ireland)	Dave Mooney	Cork City	Undisclosed	
26 August 2008	DF	(Scotland)	Chris Armstrong	Sheffield United	£500,000	
28 October 2008	MF	(England)	Michail Antonio	Tooting & Mitcham	Undisclosed	
19 January 2009	MF	(Republic of Ireland)	Jay Tabb	Coventry City	Undisclosed	

=== Loans in ===
Start date	Position	Nationality	Name	From	End date	Ref.
29 January 2009	DF	(England)	Dan Harding	Ipswich Town	End of season	
8 March 2009	MF	(England)	Glen Little	Portsmouth	End of season	
10 March 2009	FW	(England)	Dave Kitson	Stoke City	End of season	

=== Out ===
Date	Position	Nationality	Name	To	Fee	Ref.
18 July 2008	FW	(England)	Dave Kitson	Stoke City	£5,500,000	
7 August 2008	DF	(England)	Nicky Shorey	Aston Villa	Undisclosed	
29 August 2008	DF	(Senegal)	Ibrahima Sonko	Stoke City	£2,000,000	
29 January 2009	MF	(Ivory Coast)	Emerse Fae	Nice	Undisclosed	

=== Loans out ===
Start date	Position	Nationality	Name	To	End date	Ref.
10 June 2008	MF	(France)	Emerse Faé	Nice	six-month loan	
17 June 2008	GK	(England)	Ben Hamer	Brentford	Season long	
23 July 2008	MF	(Republic of Ireland)	Scott Davies	Aldershot Town	Season long	
21 August 2008	MF	(England)	Hal Robson-Kanu	Southend United	Three months	
27 August 2008	FW	(Wales)	Simon Church	Wycombe Wanderers	One month	

=== Released ===
Date	Position	Nationality	Name	Joined	Date	Ref
6 February 2009	MF	(United States)	Bobby Convey	San Jose Earthquakes	10 February 2009	
15 May 2009	DF	(Republic of Ireland)	Alan Bennett	Brentford	30 July 2009	
15 May 2009	DF	(England)	Michael Duberry	Wycombe Wanderers	10 July 2009	
15 May 2009	DF	(England)	Scott Golbourne	Exeter City	2 July 2009	
15 May 2009	GK	(United States)	Marcus Hahnemann	Wolverhampton Wanderers	17 June 2009	
15 May 2009	MF	(England)	Tom Hateley	Motherwell	13 August 2009	
15 May 2009	FW	(England)	Leroy Lita	Middlesbrough	3 August 2009	
15 May 2009	DF	(Scotland)	Graeme Murty	Southampton	5 August 2009	
15 May 2009	DF	(England)	Daniel Spence			
28 May 2009	DF	(Nigeria)	Sam Sodje	Charlton Athletic		

== Competitions ==
=== Overview ===
Competition	First match	Last match	Starting round	Final position	Record							
Competition	First match	Last match	Starting round	Final position	Pld	W	D	L	GF	GA	GD	Win %
Championship	10 August 2008	3 May 2009	Matchday 1	4th	46	21	14	11	72	40	+32	45.65
Championship Play-offs	9 May 2009	12 May 2009	Semifinal	Semifinal	2	0	0	2	0	3	−3	0.00
FA Cup	3 January 2009	3 January 2009	Third round	Third round	1	0	0	1	0	2	−2	0.00
League Cup	12 August 2008	23 September 2008	First round	Third round	3	2	0	1	9	4	+5	66.67
Total					52	23	14	15	81	49	+32	44.23

Last updated: 12 May 2009
Source: Competitions

=== Championship ===
==== Results summary ====
Overall								Home						Away					
Pld	W	D	L	GF	GA	GD	Pts	W	D	L	GF	GA	GD	W	D	L	GF	GA	GD
46	21	14	11	72	40	+32	77	12	5	6	40	17	+23	9	9	5	32	23	+9

Last updated: 8 April 2011.
Source: Reading FC

==== Results by round ====
Round	1	2	3	4	5	6	7	8	9	10	11	12	13	14	15	16	17	18	19	20	21	22	23	24	25	26	27	28	29	30	31	32	33	34	35	36	37	38	39	40	41	42	43	44	45	46
Ground	A	H	A	H	A	H	A	H	A	H	A	H	H	A	A	H	A	H	A	H	A	H	H	A	H	A	H	A	H	A	H	H	H	A	A	H	H	A	A	A	H	A	H	A	A	H
Result	D	W	L	W	L	W	D	W	W	W	L	W	D	L	W	W	W	L	D	W	W	W	W	W	D	D	W	L	W	D	D	L	L	W	D	D	L	W	D	D	L	D	D	W	W	L
Position	14	5	10	6	8	4	6	3	3	3	3	3	3	4	3	3	3	3	3	3	3	3	3	2	2	2	2	2	2	2	2	3	3	2	3	3	3	3	3	4	5	5	5	4	4	4

Source: BBC Sport
A = Away; H = Home; W = Win; D = Draw; L = Loss

==== Fixtures and results ====
10 August 2008 1	Nottingham Forest	0–0	Reading	City Ground
13:15 BST (UTC+1)		Report		Attendance: 21,571; Referee: Stuart Attwell

16 August 2008 2	Reading	2–0	Plymouth Argyle	Madejski Stadium
15:00 BST (UTC+1)	Sonko 13', 49'	Report		Attendance: 19,202; Referee: Richard Beeby

23 August 2008 3	Charlton Athletic	4–2	Reading	The Valley
12:45 BST (UTC+1)	Holland 25'; Gray 41' (pen.); Varney 68'; Bouazza 71'	Report	Sonko 45'; S Hunt 53' (pen.); Sonko (red card) 84'	Attendance: 20,020; Referee: Lee Mason

30 August 2008 4	Reading	4–2	Crystal Palace	Madejski Stadium
15:00 BST (UTC+1)	Harper 18'; Doyle 65', 67', 89'	Report	Carle 38' (pen.); Soares 64'	Attendance: 20,441; Referee: Clive Penton

13 September 2008 5	Ipswich Town	2–0	Reading	Portman Road
15:00 BST (UTC+1)	Stead 63'; Walters 84'	Report		Attendance: 21,366; Referee: Keith Hill

16 September 2008 6	Reading	6–0	Sheffield Wednesday	Madejski Stadium
20:00 BST (UTC+1)	Doyle 5', 9', 62'; Bikey 30'; N Hunt 50', 64'	Report		Attendance: 18,159; Referee: Andy Woolmer

20 September 2008 7	Watford	2–2	Reading	Vicarage Road
15:00 BST (UTC+1)	Smith 57'; O'Toole 64'	Report	Eustace 13' (o.g.); S Hunt 87' (pen.)	Attendance: 14,761; Referee: Stuart Attwell
Note: In Reading's match at Watford, John Eustace apparently scored an own goal for Reading, giving Reading the lead. However, replays show that the ball passed the line, but didn't go in between the posts. It was given by referee Stuart Attwell on the say so of his assistant Nigel Bannister who flagged for the goal.

27 September 2008 8	Reading	4–0	Swansea City	Madejski Stadium
15:00 BST (UTC+1)	N Hunt 19'; Doyle 26', 90'; S Hunt 40'	Report		Attendance: 20,093; Referee: Scott Mathieson

30 September 2008 9	Wolverhampton Wanderers	0–3	Reading	Molineux Stadium
19:45 BST (UTC+1)		Report	Hennessey 4' (o.g.); Bikey 71'; Cissé 89'	Attendance: 24,302; Referee: Rob Shoebridge

4 October 2008 10	Reading	3–1	Burnley	Madejski Stadium
15:00 BST (UTC+1)	N Hunt 4'; S Hunt 52'; Long 64'	Report	McCann 89'	Attendance: 18,621; Referee: Kevin Friend

18 October 2008 11	Preston North End	2–1	Reading	Deepdale
15:00 BST (UTC+1)	Ingimarsson 54' (o.g.); Elliott 81'	Report	S Hunt 27' (pen.)	Attendance: 12,316; Referee: Nigel Miller

21 October 2008 12	Reading	2–1	Doncaster Rovers	Madejski Stadium
20:00 BST (UTC+1)	Bikey 18'; Doyle 76'	Report	Van Nieuwstadt 74'	Attendance: 17,924; Referee: Darren Deadman

25 October 2008 13	Reading	0–0	Queens Park Rangers	Madejski Stadium
15:00 BST (UTC+1)		Report		Attendance: 20,571; Referee: Chris Foy

28 October 2008 14	Burnley	1–0	Reading	Turf Moor
19:45 GMT	Blake 81'	Report		Attendance: 11,538; Referee: Martin Haywood

1 November 2008 15	Bristol City	1–4	Reading	Ashton Gate
15:00 GMT	John 90+3'	Report	Doyle 14', 47'; N Hunt 16'; Cissé 54'	Attendance: 18,296; Referee: Jonathan Moss

8 November 2008 16	Reading	3–0	Derby County	Madejski Stadium
15:00 GMT	N Hunt 20'; Doyle 68', 75'	Report		Attendance: 18,724; Referee: Scott Mathieson

15 November 2008 17	Sheffield United	0–2	Reading	Bramall Lane
15:00 GMT		Report	Cissé 5'; Doyle 44'	Attendance: 25,065; Referee: Michael Oliver

22 November 2008 18	Reading	1–2	Southampton	Madejski Stadium
15:00 GMT	Kébé 57'	Report	Wright-Phillips 14', 49'	Attendance: 23,121; Referee: Lee Probert

25 November 2008 19	Cardiff City	2–2	Reading	Ninian Park
19:45 GMT	Routledge 10'; McCormack 41' (pen.)	Report	Doyle 16' Bikey (red card) 30'; Gunnarsson 50'	Attendance: 17,154; Referee: Peter Walton

1 December 2008 20	Reading	3–1	Coventry City	Madejski Stadium
20:00 GMT	N Hunt 32', 62' Cissé 37'	Report	Fox 26'	Attendance: 16,803; Referee: Kevin Wright

6 December 2008 21	Barnsley	0–1	Reading	Oakwell
15:15^{2} GMT		Report	Kebe (red card) 36'; Gunnarsson 63'	Attendance: 11,938; Referee: Clive Oliver
Note: The game was delayed by 15 minutes after the Reading team bus broke down on the M1.

9 December 2008 22	Reading	1–0	Blackpool	Madejski Stadium
20:00 GMT	Ingimarsson 27'	Report	Hendrie (red card) 30'	Attendance: 16,514; Referee: Jarnail Singh

13 December 2008 23	Reading	2–0	Norwich City	Madejski Stadium
15:00 GMT	S Hunt 84' (pen.) Long 86'	Report		Attendance: 19,382; Referee: Trevor Kettle

20 December 2008 24	Birmingham City	1–3	Reading	St Andrews
12:45 GMT	Phillips 60'	Report	N Hunt 12'; Doyle 65'; Cissé 81'	Attendance: 19,695; Referee: Mike Dean

26 December 2008 25	Reading	1–1	Cardiff City	Madejski Stadium
15:00 GMT	Federici 90+6'	Report	Chopra 89'	Attendance: 22,770; Referee: Andy Hall

28 December 2008 26	Southampton	1–1	Reading	St Mary's Stadium
15:00 GMT	McGoldrick 74'	Report	Long 84'	Attendance: 20,142; Referee: Phil Crossley

10 January 2009 27	Reading	4–0	Watford	Madejski Stadium
12:45 GMT	Armstrong 38'; N Hunt 66'; Doyle 67'; Lita 88'	Report		Attendance: 18,072; Referee: Andy D'Urso

17 January 2009 28	Swansea City	2–0	Reading	Liberty Stadium
15:00 GMT	Scotland 44'; Orlandi 89'	Report	Rosenior (yellow card) 75' (yellow-red card) 80'	Attendance: 15,197; Referee: F Graham

27 January 2009 29	Reading	1–0	Wolverhampton Wanderers	Madejski Stadium
20:00 GMT	Collins 2' (o.g.)	Report	Collins (red card) 90+3'	Attendance: 23,009; Referee: John Booth

31 January 2009 30	Queens Park Rangers	0–0	Reading	Loftus Road
15:00 GMT		Report		Attendance: 17,120; Referee: John Moss

7 February 2009 31	Reading	0–0	Preston North End	Madejski Stadium
15:00 GMT		Report		Attendance: 19,570; Referee: Mike Jones

21 February 2009 32	Reading	0–2	Bristol City	Madejski Stadium
15:00 GMT		Report	Adebola 26'; Rosenior 48' (o.g.)	Attendance: 22,462; Referee: Andy Penn

28 February 33	Reading	0–1	Nottingham Forest	Madejski Stadium
15:00 GMT		Report	McGugan 61'	Attendance: 21,196; Referee: Neil Swarbrick

3 March 2009 34	Sheffield Wednesday	1–2	Reading	Hillsborough Stadium
19:45 GMT	McAllister 44'	Report	Doyle 56'; Long 81'	Attendance: 19,268; Referee: Andy Hall

7 March 2009 35	Plymouth Argyle	2–2	Reading	Home Park
15:00 GMT	Gallagher 20'; Mackie 56'	Report	Pearce 22'; Kebe 80'	Attendance: 14,014; Referee: Anthony Bates

9 March 2009 36	Reading	2–2	Charlton Athletic	Madejski Stadium
20:00 GMT	Long 46' (pen.), 66'	Report	Bailey 16'; Hudson 85'	Attendance: 17,875; Referee: Anthony Taylor

14 March 2009 37	Reading	0–1	Ipswich Town	Madejski Stadium
15:00 GMT		Report	Stead 47'	Attendance: 20,592; Referee: Michael Oliver

17 March 2009 38	Doncaster Rovers	0–1	Reading	Keepmoat Stadium
19:45 GMT		Report	Kitson 82'	Attendance: 10,393; Referee: Paul Taylor

21 March 2009 39	Crystal Palace	0–0	Reading	Selhurst Park
17:20 GMT		Report	Rosenior (yellow card) 35' (yellow-red card) 71'	Attendance: 14,567; Referee: Andy D'Urso

4 April 2009 40	Coventry City	0–0	Reading	Ricoh Arena
15:00 BST (UTC+1)		Report		Attendance: 17,281; Referee: Tim Kettle

10 April 2009 41	Reading	0–1	Sheffield United	Madejski Stadium
17:30 BST (UTC+1)		Report	Howard 59'	Attendance: 20,756; Referee: Keith Friend

13 April 2009 42	Blackpool	2–2	Reading	Bloomfield Road
15:00 BST (UTC+1)	Southern 31'; Campbell 66'	Report	N Hunt 10'; Karacan 24'	Attendance: 7,722; Referee: Tim Kettle

18 April 2009 43	Reading	0–0	Barnsley	Madjeski Stadium
15:00 BST (UTC+1)		Report		Attendance: 19,240; Referee: R. Beeby

21 April 2009 44	Derby County	0–2	Reading	Pride Park Stadium
19:45 BST (UTC+1)		Report	Kitson 56'; Long 73'	Attendance: 31,345; Referee: C. Webster

27 April 2009 45	Norwich City	0–2	Reading	Carrow Road
19:45 BST (UTC+1)		Report	Long 68', 78'	Attendance: 25,041; Referee: C. Oliver

3 May 2009 46	Reading	1–2	Birmingham City	Madejski Stadium
13:15 BST (UTC+1)	Matejovsky 61'	Report	Fahey 19'; Phillips 60'	Attendance: 23,879; Referee: Howard Webb

==== Playoffs ====
===== Semi-finals =====
9 May 2009 1st Leg	Burnley	1–0	Reading	Turf Moor
17:20 BST (UTC+1)	Alexander 84' (pen.)	Report	Bikey (red card) 90+4'	Attendance: 18,005; Referee: Martin Atkinson

12 May 2009 2nd Leg	Reading	0–2 (0–3 agg.)	Burnley	Madjeski Stadium
19:45 BST (UTC+1)		Report	Paterson 51'; Thompson 58'	Attendance: 19,909; Referee: Mike Riley

==== League table ====
Pos	Team	Pld	W	D	L	GF	GA	GD	Pts	Promotion, qualification or relegation
2	Birmingham City (P)	46	23	14	9	54	37	+17	83	Promotion to the Premier League
3	Sheffield United	46	22	14	10	64	39	+25	80	Qualification for Championship play-offs
4	Reading	46	21	14	11	72	40	+32	77	Qualification for Championship play-offs
5	Burnley (O, P)	46	21	13	12	72	60	+12	76	Qualification for Championship play-offs
6	Preston North End	46	21	11	14	66	54	+12	74	Qualification for Championship play-offs

Updated to match(es) played on 3 May 2009. Source: The Football League
Rules for classification: 1) points; 2) goal difference; 3) number of goals scored.
(O) Play-off winners; (P) Promoted

=== FA Cup ===
3 January 2009 Third round	Cardiff City	2–0	Reading	Ninian Park
15:00 GMT	McCormack 58'; Ledley 83'	Report		Attendance: 12,448; Referee: Anthony Taylor

=== Football League Cup ===
12 August 2008 First round	Dagenham & Redbridge	1–2	Reading	Victoria Road
19:45 BST (UTC+1)	Taiwo 66'	Report	Henry 25'; N Hunt 89'	Attendance: 2,360; Referee: Andy Penn

26 August 2008 Second round	Reading	5–1	Luton Town	Madejski Stadium
20:00 BST (UTC+1)	N Hunt 11'; S Hunt 15'; Pearce 54'; Karacan 55'; Henry 76'	Report	Charles 80'	Attendance: 7,498; Referee: Dean Whitestone

23 September 2008 Third round	Stoke City	2–2 (a.e.t.) (4–3 p)	Reading	Britannia Stadium
19:45 BST (UTC+1)	Pericard 8'; Sidibe 49'	Report	Henry 45+1' (pen.), 75'	Attendance: 9,141; Referee: Lee Mason
	Penalties
	Fuller (penalty scored); Lawrence (penalty scored); Whelan (penalty scored); Buxton (penalty missed); Pericard (penalty scored)		(penalty scored) Bikey; (penalty missed) Henry; (penalty scored) Sigurðsson; (penalty scored) Long; (penalty missed) Lita

== Player details ==
As of match played 12 May 2009

=== Appearances ===
No.	Pos	Nat	Player	Total		Championship		FA Cup		League Cup		Play-offs	
No.	Pos	Nat	Player	Apps	Goals	Apps	Goals	Apps	Goals	Apps	Goals	Apps	Goals
1	GK	(United States) USA	Marcus Hahnemann	35	0	32	0	0	0	1	0	2	0
2	DF	(Scotland) SCO	Graeme Murty	1	0	0	0	1	0	0	0	0	0
3	DF	(Scotland) SCO	Chris Armstrong	41	1	40	1	0	0	1	0	0	0
4	MF	(Mali) MLI	Kalifa Cissé	39	5	24+12	5	0	0	2	0	0+1	0
6	MF	(Iceland) ISL	Brynjar Gunnarsson	30	2	13+14	2	0	0	1	0	2	0
7	MF	(Czech Republic) CZE	Marek Matějovský	25	1	11+11	1	1	0	0	0	2	0
8	FW	(England) ENG	Leroy Lita	12	1	6+4	1	1	0	1	0	0	0
9	FW	(Republic of Ireland) IRL	Kevin Doyle	42	18	39+2	18	0	0	0	0	1	0
10	MF	(Republic of Ireland) IRL	Stephen Hunt	49	7	41+5	6	0	0	2	1	0+1	0
11	FW	(Republic of Ireland) IRL	Noel Hunt	39	13	27+10	11	0	0	2	2	0	0
12	FW	(Republic of Ireland) IRL	Dave Mooney	2	0	0	0	0	0	0+2	0	0	0
14	MF	(Mali) MLI	Jimmy Kébé	44	2	38+3	2	0+1	0	0	0	2	0
15	MF	(England) ENG	James Harper	36	1	28+6	1	0	0	2	0	0	0
16	DF	(Iceland) ISL	Ívar Ingimarsson	29	1	26	1	0	0	2+1	0	0	0
17	FW	(England) ENG	Dave Kitson	12	2	9+1	2	0	0	0	0	0+2	0
19	DF	(England) ENG	Liam Rosenior	44	0	42	0	0	0	0	0	2	0
21	MF	(Turkey) TUR	Jem Karacan	17	2	15	1	1	0	1	1	0	0
22	DF	(Cameroon) CMR	André Bikey	28	3	23+2	3	1	0	1	0	1	0
24	FW	(Republic of Ireland) IRL	Shane Long	43	9	11+26	9	1	0	3	0	2	0
26	DF	(Scotland) SCO	Alex Pearce	21	2	13+3	1	1	0	2+1	1	1	0
27	MF	(England) ENG	James Henry	11	4	3+4	0	1	0	3	4	0	0
29	DF	(England) ENG	Michael Duberry	30	0	27	0	0	0	1	0	2	0
31	DF	(England) ENG	Dan Harding	5	0	3	0	0	0	0	0	2	0
32	GK	(Australia) AUS	Adam Federici	18	1	14+1	1	1	0	2	0	0	0
33	DF	(England) ENG	Scott Golbourne	2	0	0	0	0	0	2	0	0	0
34	MF	(Iceland) ISL	Gylfi Sigurðsson	3	0	0	0	0+1	0	0+2	0	0	0
35	FW	(Wales) WAL	Simon Church	2	0	0	0	0+1	0	0	0	1	0
37	MF	(Republic of Ireland) IRL	Jay Tabb	11	0	6+3	0	0	0	0	0	2	0
42	DF	(Republic of Ireland) IRL	Julian Kelly	11	0	4+3	0	1	0	3	0	0	0
52	MF	(England) ENG	Glen Little	9	0	5+3	0	0	0	0	0	0+1	0
Players who appeared for Reading no longer at the club:
17	MF	(United States) USA	Bobby Convey	9	0	3+3	0	1	0	2	0	0	0
31	DF	(Senegal) SEN	Ibrahima Sonko	3	3	3	3	0	0	0	0	0	0

=== Goal scorers ===
Place	Position	Nation	Number	Name	Championship	FA Cup	League Cup	Total
1	FW	(Republic of Ireland)	19	Kevin Doyle	18	0	0	18
2	FW	(Republic of Ireland)	11	Noel Hunt	11	0	2	13
3	FW	(Republic of Ireland)	24	Shane Long	9	0	0	9
4	MF	(Republic of Ireland)	10	Stephen Hunt	6	0	1	7
5	MF	(Mali)	4	Kalifa Cissé	5	0	0	5
6	MF	(England)	27	James Henry	0	0	4	4
7	DF	(Senegal)	31	Ibrahima Sonko	3	0	0	3
7	DF	(Cameroon)	22	André Bikey	3	0	0	3
7				Own goal	3	0	0	3
10	FW	(England)	17	Dave Kitson	2	0	0	2
10	MF	(Mali)	14	Jimmy Kébé	2	0	0	2
10	MF	(Iceland)	6	Brynjar Gunnarsson	2	0	0	2
10	DF	(Scotland)	26	Alex Pearce	1	0	1	2
10	DF	(Turkey)	21	Jem Karacan	1	0	1	2
15	GK	(Australia)	32	Adam Federici	1	0	0	1
15	DF	(Iceland)	16	Ívar Ingimarsson	1	0	0	1
15	MF	(England)	15	James Harper	1	0	0	1
15	FW	(England)	8	Leroy Lita	1	0	0	1
15	MF	(Czech Republic)	7	Marek Matějovský	1	0	0	1
15	DF	(Scotland)	3	Chris Armstrong	1	0	0	1
				TOTALS	72	0	9	81

=== Disciplinary record ===
Number	Nation	Position	Name	Championship		FA Cup		League Cup		Total	
Number	Nation	Position	Name	Yellow card	Red card	Yellow card	Red card	Yellow card	Red card	Yellow card	Red card
19	(England)	DF	Liam Rosenior	8	2	0	0	0	0	8	2
22	(Cameroon)	DF	André Bikey	4	1	1	0	1	0	6	1
10	(Republic of Ireland)	MF	Stephen Hunt	6	0	0	0	0	0	6	0
3	(Scotland)	DF	Chris Armstrong	6	0	0	0	0	0	6	0
7	(Czech Republic)	MF	Marek Matějovský	5	0	0	0	0	0	5	0
11	(Republic of Ireland)	FW	Noel Hunt	4	0	0	0	1	0	5	0
21	(Turkey)	MF	Jem Karacan	4	0	0	0	0	0	4	0
9	(Republic of Ireland)	FW	Kevin Doyle	4	0	0	0	0	0	4	0
6	(Iceland)	MF	Brynjar Gunnarsson	3	0	0	0	0	0	3	0
15	(England)	MF	James Harper	3	0	0	0	0	0	3	0
4	(Mali)	MF	Kalifa Cissé	2	0	0	0	1	0	3	0
29	(England)	DF	Michael Duberry	3	0	0	0	0	0	3	0
24	(Republic of Ireland)	FW	Shane Long	3	0	0	0	0	0	3	0
14	(Mali)	MF	Jimmy Kébé	2	1	0	0	0	0	2	1
26	(Scotland)	DF	Alex Pearce	1	0	0	0	0	0	1	0
37	(Republic of Ireland)	MF	Jay Tabb	1	0	0	0	0	0	1	0
16	(Iceland)	DF	Ívar Ingimarsson	1	0	0	0	0	0	1	0
27	(England)	MF	James Henry	0	0	0	0	1	0	1	0
			TOTALS	60	4	1	0	4	0	65	4
