= Gobern =

Gobern is a surname. Notable people with the surname include:

- Oscar Gobern (born 1991), English footballer, brother of Lewis
- Lewis Gobern (born 1985), English footballer
