= Matthew Shaw =

Matthew or Matt Shaw may refer to

- Matt Shaw (Australian rules footballer) (born 1992), played from 2011–2018
- Matt Shaw (baseball) (born 2001), American baseball player
- Matthew Shaw (English footballer) (born 1984), played from 2004–2007

== See also ==
- Mat and Savanna Shaw, American father/daughter duo from Utah
