= Danny Warrender =

English footballer

Personal information
- Date of birth: 28 April 1986 (age 40)
- Place of birth: Manchester, England
- Height: 1.78 m (5 ft 10 in)
- Position: Defender

Team information
- Current team: Ramsbottom United

Youth career
- Manchester City

Senior career*
Years	Team	Apps	(Gls)
2005–2006	Manchester City	0	(0)
2005–2006	→ Blackpool (loan)	12	(0)
2006	Blackpool	3	(0)
2006–2007	Rossendale United		
2007	San Francisco Seals	11	(0)
2008–2009	FC United of Manchester	38	(1)
2010–2011	Ramsbottom United		
2012	FC United of Manchester	2	(0)
2012–2014	Ramsbottom United	73	(6)
2014	Salford City		
2014	Ramsbottom United	3	(0)
- * Club domestic league appearances and goals as of 23:59, 13 September 2014 (UTC)

Daniel Warrender (born 28 April 1986) is an English footballer whose last known club was Ramsbottom United in the Northern Premier League Premier Division.

Warrender has previously played for Manchester City, in his hometown, and Blackpool. He also had a spell in America with San Francisco Seals.

On 13 September 2008, he made his first appearance for F.C. United of Manchester, in a goalless FA Cup first round qualifying match against Nantwich Town. He then played for the club for two seasons. He appeared 47 times for the club before leaving in December 2009 to take a break from football due to a hip injury.

He subsequently played for Ramsbottom United for a season between 2010 and 2011. He rejoined FC United in February 2012. In March 2012 he rejoined Ramsbottom United.

In the summer of 2014 he moved to Salford City. before quickly moving back to Ramsbottom United after the beginning of the season.
