= Martin Haywood =

Australian cricketer (born 1969)

Personal information
- Born: 7 October 1969 (age 57); Tamworth, New South Wales, Australia
- Source: ESPNcricinfo, 31 December 2016

Martin Haywood (born 7 October 1969) is an Australian former cricketer. He played thirteen first-class and ten List A matches for New South Wales between 1991/92 and 1996/97.

== See also ==
- List of New South Wales representative cricketers
