= Sean Taylor (footballer) =

English footballer

Personal information
- Date of birth: 9 December 1985 (age 40)
- Place of birth: Wansbeck, England
- Position: Midfielder

Team information
- Current team: Morpeth Town

Youth career
- –: Sunderland

Senior career*
Years	Team	Apps	(Gls)
2003–2006	Sunderland	0	(0)
2006	→ Blackpool (loan)	15	(0)
2007–2007	Ashington	0	(0)
2007–2009	Amble United	54	(50)
2012–?	Morpeth Town	168	(75)
- * Club domestic league appearances and goals

Sean Taylor (born 9 December 1985) is an English former footballer. He played as a midfielder in the Football League for Blackpool, while on loan from Sunderland, for whom he did not make a first-team appearance. He moved into non-League football with Ashington in January 2007.
