= Marc Joseph =

English footballer

Personal information
- Full name: Marc Ellis Joseph
- Date of birth: 10 November 1976 (age 49)
- Place of birth: Leicester, England
- Position: Defender

Senior career*
Years	Team	Apps	(Gls)
1995–2001	Cambridge United	153	(0)
1995	→ Cambridge City (loan)	4	(0)
1996	→ Coventry City (loan)	0	(0)
2001–2002	Peterborough United	61	(2)
2002–2006	Hull City	89	(1)
2005–2006	→ Bristol City (loan)	3	(0)
2006	→ Blackpool (loan)	1	(0)
2006–2007	Blackpool	23	(0)
2007–2010	Rotherham United	76	(4)
2010–2011	Altrincham	40	(4)
2011–2013	Kendal Town	53	(5)
2013	Witton Albion	9	(1)
2013–2014	Northwich Victoria	9	(1)
Total		527	(18)

International career
2008–2012	Antigua and Barbuda	12	(1)
- * Club domestic league appearances and goals

Marc Ellis Joseph (born 10 November 1976) is an English former professional footballer who played as a defender. He earned twelve caps for the Antigua and Barbuda national team.

== Club career ==
Born in Leicester, East Midlands, Joseph previously played for a number of clubs, including Hull City and Blackpool. Joseph played 86 games for Hull, including playing a part in back-to-back promotions from Division Three (which became League Two) and League One to the Championship, scoring his only goal for the club against Macclesfield. In January 2006 he joined Blackpool, initially on loan from Hull, before making the deal permanent. He was not involved in the club's League One play-off winning campaign in 2006–07, not starting a first-team game between a 4–4 League Trophy draw with Accrington Stanley on 31 October 2006, and his release by the club on 31 May 2007.

He signed for newly relegated League Two side Rotherham United in June 2007. Marc Joseph scored his first Rotherham goal on 29 December 2007 with a fine shot from 25 yards which became the winning goal against Notts County, giving Rotherham their first league win against them after 50 years. Joseph joined Altrincham on 6 August 2010.

In the summer of 2011, Joseph joined Kendal Town on a free transfer, becoming the club captain.

In March 2013 Joseph joined Northern Premier League side Witton Albion. He made his debut on 1 April, making nine appearances and scoring one goal, against his former club Kendal Town.

== International career ==
Joseph played for Antigua and Barbuda in non-FIFA regulated friendlies in June 2008 and made his debut against Saint Kitts and Nevis in a friendly before playing both legs of Antigua's World Cup qualifiers against Cuba.

=== International goals ===
Scores and results list Antigua and Barbuda's goal tally first.

Goal	Date	Venue	Opponent	Score	Result	Competition
1.	2 September 2011	Sir Vivian Richards Stadium, North Sound, Antigua and Barbuda	Curaçao	1–1	5–2	2011 FIFA World Cup qualification

== Post-football career ==
Joseph now works for Blackpool FC Community Trust.

== Honours ==
EFL League two runner up – Cambridge Utd

EFL League two runner up – Hull City

EFL League One runner up – Hull city

Blackpool

- League One play-offs: 2006–07
