= Jamie Burns =

English footballer

Personal information
- Full name: Jamie Daniel Burns
- Date of birth: 6 March 1984 (age 42)
- Place of birth: Blackpool, England
- Position: Midfielder

Senior career*
Years	Team	Apps	(Gls)
2001–2006	Blackpool	47	(1)
2006	→ Bury (loan)	1	(0)
2006–2007	→ Morecambe (loan)	14	(0)
2007—2009	Morecambe	7	(0)
- * Club domestic league appearances and goals

Jamie Daniel Burns (born 6 March 1984 in Blackpool, Lancashire) is an English professional footballer who played in midfield for Morecambe, whom he joined from Blackpool on 1 July 2007. He had been on loan from his hometown club since November 2006. At Blackpool, Burns scored four goals with strikes against Boreham Wood in the FA Cup, MK Dons in the league and a brace against Huddersfield Town in the Football League Trophy. After making his move to Morecambe permanent he scored once for the club in a 1–0 win over Tranmere Rovers in the Football League Trophy.
