= Alex Bailey (footballer) =

English footballer

Personal information
- Date of birth: 21 September 1983 (age 43)
- Place of birth: Newham, London, England
- Position: Right back

Senior career*
Years	Team	Apps	(Gls)
2001–2004	Arsenal	0	(0)
2004–2007	Chesterfield	93	(1)
2007–2008	Halifax Town	4	(0)
2008–2010	St Albans City	35	(0)
Total		129	(1)

International career^{‡}
1999	England U16	6	(0)
- * Club domestic league appearances and goals as of 09:50, 15 July 2008 (UTC) ‡ National team caps and goals as of 14:05, 27 June 2011 (UTC)

Alex Bailey (born 21 September 1983) is a professional footballer. A right-back, Bailey began as an Arsenal trainee, winning the FA Youth Cup in 2001, but was released by the Gunners and signed by Chesterfield prior to the start of the 2004–05 season. He remained at Saltergate for three years scoring one goal before moving on to Halifax Town and then St Albans City before being released at the end of the 2009/10 season after only making 15 appearances

== Early career ==
Bailey attended St Bonaventure's RC School from age 11 to 14. Alex played for the scholar football team and captained while he attended St Bons. Alex attended St Bonaventures alongside other notable footballers such as Jermain Defoe of Tottenham Hotspur and Clayton Fortune, who formally played for Aldershot Town. Alex was spotted and subsequently taken in as an Arsenal trainee thereafter.

== Honours ==
Arsenal

- FA Youth Cup: 2000–01
