= Rory Prendergast =

English footballer (born 1978)

Personal information
- Date of birth: 6 April 1978 (age 48)
- Place of birth: Pontefract, England
- Height: 5 ft 8 in (1.73 m)
- Position: Midfielder

Team information
- Current team: Clevedon Town

Youth career
- Frickley Athletic
- 1994–1995: Rochdale

Senior career*
Years	Team	Apps	(Gls)
1995–1998	Barnsley	0	(0)
1998–1999	York City	3	(0)
1999	Oldham Athletic	0	(0)
1999	Northwich Victoria	7	(0)
2000	Nuneaton Borough	6	(0)
2001–2002	Frickley Athletic	-	(-)
2002	Bradford Park Avenue	-	(-)
2002–2005	Accrington Stanley	70	(11)
2005–2007	Blackpool	31	(0)
2005–2006	→ Halifax Town (loan)	6	(0)
2007	Rochdale	19	(2)
2007	→ Darlington (loan)	8	(0)
2008–2009	Farsley Celtic	17	(0)
2009–2009	Eastwood Town	??	
2009–2009	Bradford Park Avenue	1	(0)
2009	Goole	1	(1)
2011–2012	Tiverton Town	1	
2012–	Clevedon Town		
- * Club domestic league appearances and goals as of 18:55 23 February 2013

Rory Prendergast (born 6 April 1978 in Pontefract, West Yorkshire) is an English footballer who began his career at Frickley Athletic and played in the Football League for York City, Blackpool, Rochdale and Darlington.
