= Simon Wiles =

English footballer (born 1985)

Personal information
- Full name: Simon Peter Wiles
- Date of birth: 22 April 1985 (age 41)
- Place of birth: Preston, England
- Position: Midfielder

Senior career*
Years	Team	Apps	(Gls)
2003–2008	Blackpool	31	(3)
2006–2007	→ Macclesfield Town (loan)	7	(0)
2007–2008	→ Macclesfield Town (loan)	17	(0)
2008–2009	Dunfermline Athletic	8	(0)
2010–2013	Barrow	28	(4)
2013–2014	Chorley	?	(?)
2014	Salford City	4	(0)
2014–2018	Bamber Bridge	?	(?)

Managerial career
- 2021: Fleetwood Town (interim)
- 2023–2024: Salford City (caretaker)
- 2025–: Liverpool U18
- * Club domestic league appearances and goals

Simon Peter Wiles (born 22 April 1985) is an English football coach and former player who is currently head coach of Liverpool Under 18s.

== Career ==
Wiles signed for Blackpool in 2003 as a trainee. In October 2006, he joined Macclesfield Town under then manager, Paul Ince, on a month's loan, following teammate John Murphy who had also joined the club on loan a few days earlier. On 31 January 2007 his loan was extended until the end of the 2006–07 season.

After his loan spell expired he returned to Blackpool, but went out on loan to Macclesfield again on 17 July 2007, and he remained at Moss Rose until January 2008. In May 2008 he was offered a new contract by Blackpool.

In July 2008, Wiles had a trial at League Two club Morecambe, playing in two pre-season games, with manager Sammy McIlroy trying to arrange a deal with Blackpool. In August 2008 he moved to Scottish First Division side Dunfermline Athletic on a one-year contract but was later to suffer a serious knee injury which sidelined him for the rest of the season.

In January 2010, Wiles joined Conference team Barrow on non-contract terms. He later signed a contract in July 2010 after a successful pre-season campaign but suffered another serious knee injury in a match against Altrincham on 21 September 2010 which put him out of action for the rest of the 2010–11 season.

In June 2013, he became under-10s coach at Blackpool. Wiles signed for Chorley in 2013 after a successful trial and played a part in the club winning the Northern League Premier Division title.

=== Salford City ===
In the summer of 2014 he moved to Salford City. He made his club debut in the opening league match of the season on 16 August as Salford beat Scarborough 4–1. He left the club in early November 2014.

=== Bamber Bridge ===
On 4 November 2014, Simon signed for local rivals Bamber Bridge.

== Coaching career ==
In 2015, Wiles was named first-team coach at Bamber Bridge. He was promoted to the role of assistant manager in December 2016.

In May 2018, Wiles joined League One club Fleetwood Town in a coaching role with the club's under-18s team. In January 2021, Wiles was appointed first-team interim manager following the sacking of Joey Barton.

In July 2022, Wiles departed Fleetwood Town, joining Salford City as first-team coach. Following the sacking of Neil Wood, he was appointed caretaker manager in December 2023. On 27 September 2024, the club announced that Wiles had departed in order to join an unnamed Premier League club. It was later confirmed that Wiles joined Manchester United as lead coach of the U14 academy team. In August 2025 Wiles was appointed head coach for Liverpool U18s.

== Honours ==
Barrow

- FA Trophy: 2009–10
