= Matthew Shaw (English footballer) =

English footballer

Personal information
- Full name: Matthew Alan Shaw
- Date of birth: 7 May 1984 (age 42)
- Place of birth: Blackpool, England
- Height: 6 ft 2 in (1.88 m)
- Position: Forward

Youth career
- Sheffield Wednesday

Senior career*
Years	Team	Apps	(Gls)
2004	Wrexham	1	(0)
2004–2006	Blackpool	10	(0)
2006–2007	Morecambe	4	(0)
2007	Northwich Victoria	9	(120)
- * Club domestic league appearances and goals as of 06:15, 23 March 2018 (UTC)

Matthew Alan Shaw (born 7 May 1984) is an English former footballer. During his career, he has played in the English Football League for Wrexham and Blackpool.

== Career ==
Originally a Sheffield Wednesday youngster, he was released by the club in 2004 before he would join League One Wrexham on non-contract terms. He would make one appearance for the Welsh club, coming on as a 90th minute substitute in a 2–1 win against Colchester United.

After leaving Wrexham, Shaw would join home-town club Blackpool originally on non-contract terms, however, after one appearance in the FA Cup, he would sign a long-term deal with the club.

Shaw would leave Blackpool in 2006, joining Morecambe where he would stay for half a season during the season Morecambe won the Conference National play-offs.

His last club was Morcambe's conference rivals Northwich Victoria, who he played for in the second half of the 2006–07 season.
