= Neil Wood =

English footballer

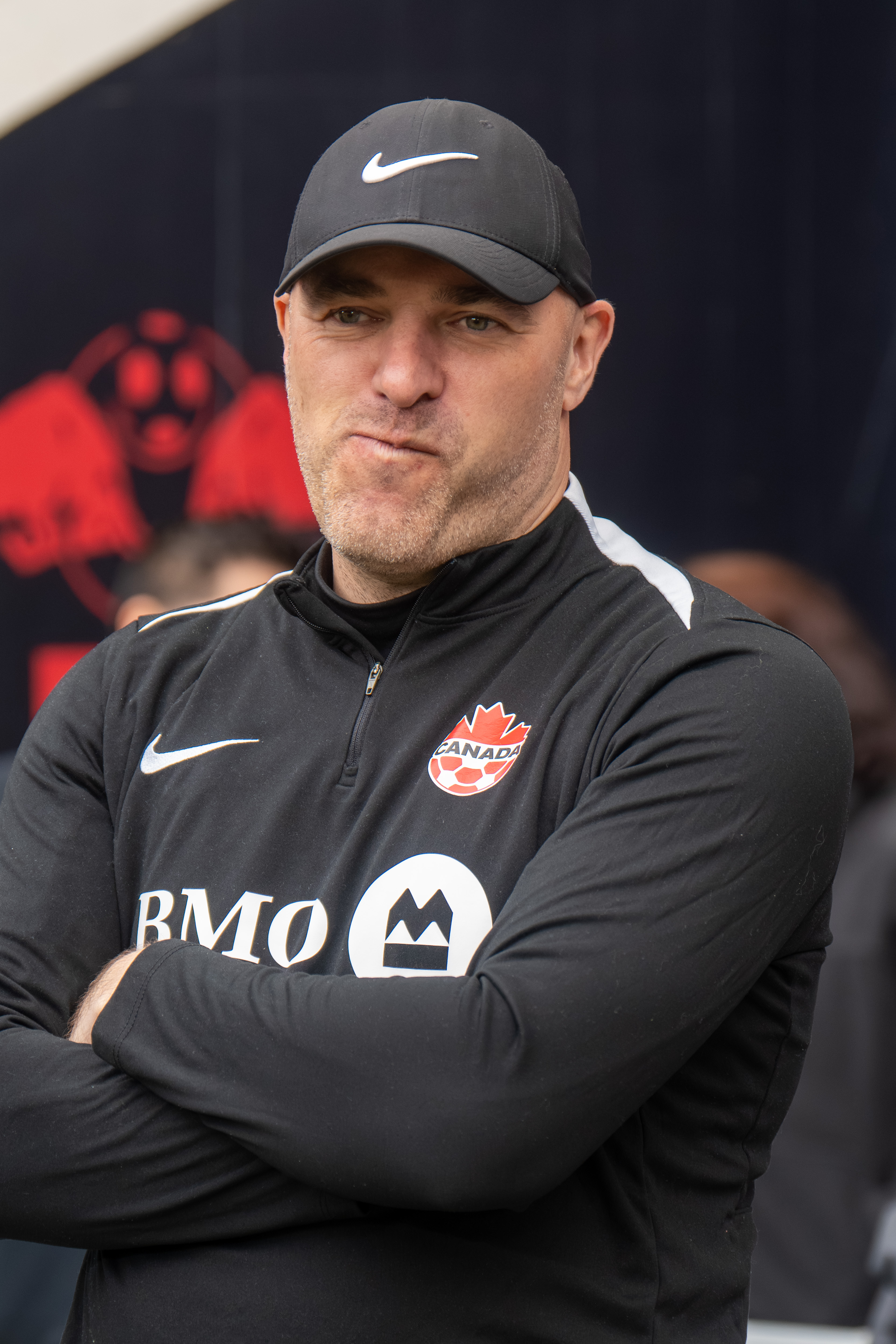
- Wood in 2026

Personal information
- Full name: Neil Anthony Wood
- Date of birth: 4 January 1983 (age 43)
- Place of birth: Stretford, Greater Manchester, England
- Height: 5 ft 10 in (1.78 m)
- Position: Midfielder

Youth career
- 1991–2001: Manchester United

Senior career*
Years	Team	Apps	(Gls)
2001–2004	Manchester United	0	(0)
2001–2002	→ Royal Antwerp (loan)	3	(0)
2003	→ Peterborough United (loan)	3	(1)
2004	→ Burnley (loan)	10	(1)
2004–2006	Coventry City	17	(0)
2006	→ Blackpool (loan)	3	(0)
2006	Blackpool	4	(0)
2006–2007	Oldham Athletic	5	(0)
2008	Željezničar	16	(0)
2010	Atherstone Town		
Total		61	(2)

International career
1998	England U16	1	(2)

Managerial career
- 2022–2023: Salford City
- * Club domestic league appearances and goals

Neil Anthony Wood (born 4 January 1983) is an English football manager and former player. He was most recently the manager of EFL League Two club Salford City.

As a player, Wood played as a midfielder. He began his playing career in the academy of Manchester United, though he never appeared for the first team due to several injuries. He was sent out on loan several times, first to Belgian club Royal Antwerp where he made his professional début in 2001, and later to Peterborough United and Burnley, before departing the club in 2004 for Coventry City. Wood struggled for regular appearances and after 18 months was loaned to Blackpool, who signed him permanently shortly after. Wood then moved first to Oldham Athletic and then to Bosnian team Željezničar. He returned to England in 2009, spending time with amateur side Atherstone Town before retiring in 2010.

Upon his retirement Wood began coaching, beginning with Aston Villa in their academy before moving back to United, where he rose through the ranks to become U23 manager in 2019. After three years in the role, Wood was appointed manager of Salford City, his first role in senior football. In 2023, Wood was sacked by Salford with the club 21st in the league.

== Playing career ==
=== Manchester United: injuries and loans ===
Having joined the club aged eight, Wood began his career as a trainee with Manchester United in 1999, and turned professional the following year. He was a member of the reserve team and scored on his debut, playing as a striker alongside David Healy under the tutelage of Jimmy Ryan. Around this time he also played for the England U16 team, scoring two goals on his debut in the Victory Shield. He eventually received a first-team squad number but never made a senior team appearance, suffering with various injuries including a blood clot in his thigh, a fractured skull, and articular cartilage damage, keeping him out of action for 18 months. The emerging talents of players such as Darren Fletcher and David Jones meant he was overtaken in the youth pecking order in his absence.

In December 2001, Wood was loaned out to Belgian club Royal Antwerp of the First Division alongside teammate Alan Tate, and to Peterborough United of the Football League Second Division on a one-month loan in September 2003, rejecting a move to Third Division team Swansea City in the process; neither loan proved to be successful for Wood. During his time at Peterborough, he scored his first goal in English football, scoring in a 2–1 defeat against Colchester United, described by BBC Sport as "a stunning 25-yard free kick".

In January 2004, he was loaned out to First Division team Burnley, who were struggling in the season, and which was then extended the following month for a further two months; manager Stan Ternent expressed his gratitude to United manager Alex Ferguson for allowing Wood to remain with the club. During his time at Burnley, he scored once against Norwich City in a 5–3 defeat, opening the scoring at Turf Moor with a free-kick from just outside the penalty area. In April, he admitted to the Lancashire Telegraph that he had struggled to adapt to the style of football in the lower leagues, but played through a knee injury to try and keep Burnley in the division.

=== Coventry City, Blackpool and Oldham Athletic ===
Wood departed United in the summer of 2004 after 13 years at the club, signing for Coventry City on a two-year contract. Upon signing, manager Peter Reid told the Coventry Telegraph that Wood reminded him of former Everton teammate Kevin Sheedy, also a left-footed midfielder. He made his début in a 4–1 League Cup first round win against Torquay United, but appearances at his new club were rare, and he struggled to avoid picking up injuries and maintaining his fitness. Having made just five appearances in the 2005–06 season, Wood departed the club initially on loan to Blackpool in January 2006, and in the same month the move was made permanent on a contract until the end of the season. Wood received a red card for a dangerous tackle on Gavin Strachan in a fixture against Hartlepool United on 28 January.

Later in the same year, he again moved club, signing a two-year contract with Oldham Athletic following a successful trial period. Upon signing, he criticised Blackpool for offering him a new deal only after pre-season had begun, as well as saying their contract offer was "rubbish". After several appearances, Wood suffered a season-ending knee injury in training, requiring surgery on his anterior cruciate ligament. The injury led to his release from the team. Remembering his experience of lower league football in a 2019 interview with The Athletic, he said that he struggled to adapt and was "sick of the style of player. I wanted to get out", while in a 2020 interview with the same publication, he recalled how Oldham manager John Sheridan had told him that he was "too good to play in a three but couldn't play in a central two", as Sheridan didn't want him to "get on the ball and play", one of his primary attributes, leaving him disillusioned with English football.

=== Željezničar, departure and retirement ===
I just felt I needed a challenge to go to a country where it was more technical and it was really good. It was the first time I'd gone from the normal 4–4–2 tactics in the lower leagues in England to 4–2–3–1 and 4–3–3 so it was a new experience for me... It was quite far away and doesn't have that exposure but, football-wise, it was one of my most enjoyable times after I left United.

— Wood discussing his move to Bosnia and Herzegovina

In February 2008, Wood signed with Premier League of Bosnia and Herzegovina club Željezničar, where he was managed by Simo Krunić, and experienced tactics-based football for the first time since departing United. Wood was released in the summer after only a few appearances, requiring a double hernia operation. He was well accepted by the players and fans, and became the first Englishman in the league.

Following his release from Željezničar, Wood returned to England and settled down in the Tamworth area, where he began training with Southern Football League Division One Central side Atherstone Town. In December, Wood signed a deal with the club and was awaiting international clearance before he could make an appearance. After several attempts made to contact Željezničar failed, in January 2010 Wood and the club turned to FIFA for assistance with the matter. In November of that year and having made his debut, Wood scored an equalising goal in a 1–1 draw against Rugby Town.

== Management career ==
=== Academy coaching ===
Following his retirement, Wood began observing coaching sessions with Aston Villa, advancing to taking on coaching responsibilities at various youth levels in their academy. Wood initially undertook the role without a wage, taking his coaching badges simultaneously. Villa offered him part-time and full-time roles, but he eventually returned to his hometown of Manchester in 2014, where he worked at the Manchester United academy from under-15 through to under-23 level. He was promoted by the club to the position of under-23 manager in 2019, with former United player Quinton Fortune assisting him in the role, and in his first year in the role, Wood guided the team to promotion back to the Premier League 2. In the 2021–22 season of the UEFA Youth League, Wood guided United to the last 16, where they were defeated on penalties by Borussia Dortmund. In his time as lead coach of the under-23s at Old Trafford, 17 academy players have made first-team debuts for the club.

=== Salford City ===
In May 2022 he was appointed as manager of Salford City, replacing Gary Bowyer, and made his first signing the following month, bringing in Scottish striker Callum Hendry on a free transfer following his release by Scottish Premiership team St Johnstone. Wood guided Salford to a 2–0 win against Mansfield Town in his first game in charge on the opening day of the 2022–23 season. At the conclusion of the league season, Wood led Salford to the EFL play-offs for the first time, drawing 2–2 on aggregate with Stockport County before losing 3–1 in the resulting penalty shootout.

At the beginning of the 2023–24 season, Salford and Wood endured five league defeats in a row, a record for the club since promotion to the EFL in 2019. On 27 December 2023, Wood was sacked by Salford following a 5–1 home defeat to Tranmere Rovers the previous day, which extended their winless run in the league to eight games and left Salford in 21st place in League Two. Wood was replaced by Karl Robinson.

== Managerial statistics ==
As of match played 26 December 2023

Team	From	To	Record				
Team	From	To	P	W	D	L	Win %
Salford City	20 May 2022	27 December 2023	88	33	21	34	37.5
Total			88	33	21	34	37.5
