= Lewis Gobern =

English footballer

Personal information
- Full name: Lewis Thomas Gobern
- Date of birth: 28 January 1985 (age 41)
- Place of birth: Birmingham, England
- Position: Winger

Youth career
- Wolverhampton Wanderers

Senior career*
Years	Team	Apps	(Gls)
2004–2009	Wolverhampton Wanderers	13	(2)
2004	→ Hartlepool United (loan)	1	(0)
2005–2006	→ Blackpool (loan)	8	(1)
2006	→ Bury (loan)	7	(1)
2009	→ Colchester United (loan)	12	(0)
2009–2010	Milton Keynes Dons	19	(0)
2010–2011	Grimsby Town	9	(0)
2011	Notts County	4	(0)
Total		73	(4)

International career
2000	England U16	1	
2002-2003	England U18	3	
2003	England U19	1	
- * Club domestic league appearances and goals

Lewis Thomas Gobern (born 28 January 1985) is an English former professional footballer who played as a winger between 2004 and 2011.

He played for Wolverhampton Wanderers, Hartlepool United, Blackpool, Bury, Colchester United, Milton Keynes Dons, Grimsby Town and Notts County.

== Career ==
=== Wolverhampton Wanderers ===
Gobern, born in Birmingham, is a product of Wolves' youth academy. He gained his first professional experience on loan at Hartlepool United during the 2004–05 season, where he made his senior debut on 2 November 2004 in a 1–0 win over Carlisle United in the Football League Trophy. He later had spells on loan at Blackpool and Bury, respectively, during the 2005–06 season.

He made his Wolves debut on 5 November 2005, coming on as a substitute in a 2–0 win against Norwich City. However, he was not used again by Glenn Hoddle and only appeared again nine months later, as a substitute in a 1–1 draw at Plymouth Argyle, the first game of Mick McCarthy's reign. He progressed to being a first-team starter over Autumn 2006, and marked these appearances with two goals in successive games, against Crystal Palace and Leicester City.

However, his debut season was cut short by two separate hamstring injuries that kept him out of action after Christmas. He signed a new two-year contract in June 2007, but spent the whole of the 2007–08 season on the sidelines after suffering a knee injury in training.

He returned to reserve team football in August 2008 and, in January 2009, joined Colchester United on a month's loan. He returned to his parent club at the conclusion of the season but was not offered a new contract and was released.

=== Milton Keynes Dons ===
Following his release from Wolves, he signed a one-year contract with a one-year option with League One side Milton Keynes Dons. This reunited him with his former Wolves teammate Paul Ince who had since gone into management. Gobern made 26 appearances for the Dons during the season, but departed at its conclusion after Ince resigned.

=== Grimsby Town ===
On 1 June 2010 it was announced that Gobern had joined Conference National newcomers Grimsby Town on a one-year deal. Gobern made his debut for The Mariners on 24 August 2010 in a 1–0 away victory over Darlington.

Gobern struggled to find his feet in Grimsby and fell out of contention in the squad where he was often looked over in preference of Michael Coulson. On 26 November 2010 Gobern was involved in a training ground bust-up with Lee Ridley in which he suffered a broken nose. On 7 January 2011 his contract canceled by mutual consent.

=== Notts County ===
Gobern found another club days later when he was again signed by Paul Ince, now in charge of League One Notts County. This deal expired at the end of the season and he was released after making just four appearances for the Magpies.

== Personal life ==
Gobern is the brother of fellow professional footballer Oscar Gobern.
