= Ciaran Donnelly (footballer) =

English footballer (born 1984)

Personal information
- Date of birth: 2 April 1984 (age 42)
- Place of birth: Blackpool, England
- Position: Midfielder

Team information
- Current team: Blackpool (Academy Director)

Youth career
- Blackpool
- Blackburn Rovers

Senior career*
Years	Team	Apps	(Gls)
2002–2005	Blackburn Rovers	0	(0)
2004	→ Blackpool (loan)	9	(0)
2005–2007	Blackpool	32	(2)
2006–2007	→ Southport (loan)	11	(1)
2007	→ Macclesfield Town (loan)		
2007–2008	Fleetwood Town		
2008	Glenavon	7	(0)
2009	AFC Blackpool		
2010–2011	Barrow	16	(0)
2011–?	Kendal Town		

International career
2000	England U16		
2002	England U18		
2002–2003	England U19	9	(7)
- * Club domestic league appearances and goals

Ciaran Donnelly (born 2 April 1984) is an English former professional footballer. He is now the Academy Director at Blackpool.

He has played for England at Under-16, Under-18 and Under-19 levels.

== Early life ==
Born in Blackpool, Lancashire, Donnelly attended Claremont Primary School and Warbreck Hill High School in North Shore, Blackpool. He joined the Centre of Excellence at his hometown club, where he stayed until he was fourteen years old, when he joined the Academy at Premier League club Blackburn Rovers.

== Club career ==
Donnelly started out in the youth team and then as a trainee at Blackburn Rovers in 2002. After being an ever-present in the club's reserve team in the 2003–04 season, on 25 March 2004 he was sent on loan to Blackpool who were then in League One. He played nine league matches before the loan spell ran out on 9 May. However, he did not make any first-team appearances for Blackburn Rovers and he signed for his hometown club on a free transfer on 16 March 2005 initially until the end of the season, with an option for a further year. On 2 September 2005, Donelly scored the winning goal as Blackpool beat Doncaster Rovers 1–0 at Belle Vue in League One.

On 23 November 2006, Blackpool sent him on loan to Southport, who were then in the Conference National, where he played eleven league games, scoring one goal. Then, after he returned from Southport, he was sent on loan to League Two club Macclesfield Town on 22 March 2007 until the end of the season.

After making one appearance, in the Football League Trophy, in 2006–07 for Blackpool, and failing to break into the first-team squad as the club was promoted to the Championship, he was released at the end of the season. He signed a two-year contract with Fleetwood Town, who were then in the Northern Premier League Premier Division for the start of the 2007–08 season, scoring just three minutes into his debut on 18 August 2007 in a 1–0 away win at Ossett Town.

He moved to Northern Ireland in January 2008 to play for IFA Premiership club Glenavon. His only goal for the club came in a 6–3 defeat to Loughall in the Mid-Ulster Cup. He left Glenavon at the end of the 2007–08 season.

Without a club, Donnelly returned home to Blackpool, where he played Sunday League football in the Blackpool & Fylde Sunday League Alliance. In the 2009–10 season, he played part-time with local club AFC Blackpool in the North West Counties Football League First Division.

After impressing during a series of trials in the summer of 2010, Donnelly signed for Barrow in July 2010. Donnelly left the club on 31 January 2011 after the club decided not to extend his contract.

== International career ==
Donnelly has played for his country at under-16, under-18 and under-19 level.

On 1 July 2000, he scored England's under-16s goal as they lost 2–1 to Brazil at the Stadium of Light in Sunderland. and in September 2000 he played in the under-16 team that beat their Republic of Ireland counterparts 3–1 at the Bescot Stadium in Walsall.

In June 2002 he played for the under-18 side at the Under 18s International Tournament in Lisbon, Portugal.

He helped England under-19s qualify for the finals of the 2003 UEFA European Under-19 Football Championship. He played in all three group games in the first qualifying round, as England played in a mini-group tournament. And in the final game, Donnelly scored all four of England's goals as they beat Romania under-19s 4–0. In the second qualifying round, he scored the winning goal as England beat the Republic of Ireland 1–0 at Tolka Park in Dublin and followed that up two days later with two goals against Slovenia as England won 3–0 at Dalymount Park in Dublin. and then played in the final group game against Switzerland at United Park in Drogheda which England won 1–0 to qualify for the finals.

He was in the England squad for the finals which were held in Liechtenstein in July 2003, and he played in all three of England's games as they went out of the competition at the group stage.

== Coaching career ==
After retiring from playing in 2011, Donnelly began working with Blackpool F.C.'s Community Trust, headed by former Northern Ireland international Derek Spence.

He later became Academy Manager at Blackpool, before leaving to coach at nearby Fleetwood Town between 2017 and 2020. He returned to Blackpool as Academy Director on 10 August 2020.

== Honours ==
Blackpool

- League One play-off final: 2006–07
