= List of English football transfers winter 2007–08 =

This is a list of English football transfers for the 2007–08 winter transfer window. Only moves featuring at least one Premier League or Championship club are listed.

The winter transfer window opened on 1 January 2008, although a few transfers took place prior to that date; the first non-free non-loan move went through on 12 December 2007. The window closed at midnight on 31 January. Players without a club could join one, either during or in between transfer windows. Clubs below Premier League level could also sign players on loan at any time. If need be, clubs could sign a goalkeeper on an emergency loan, if all others were unavailable.

== Transfers ==
Date	Name	Moving from	Moving to	Fee
4 September 2007	Jay-Jay Okocha	Unattached	Hull City	Free
4 September 2007	Salomon Olembé	Unattached	Wigan Athletic	Free
5 September 2007	Phil Marsh	Unattached	Blackpool	Free
7 September 2007	Aaron Goode	Queens Park Rangers	Kingstonian	Loan
14 September 2007	Cédric Avinel	Watford	Stafford Rangers	Loan
14 September 2007	Adam Johnson	Middlesbrough	Watford	Loan
14 September 2007	Ryan Shotton	Stoke City	Altrincham	Loan
16 September 2007	Zac Jones	Blackburn Rovers	Stockport County	Loan
17 September 2007	Scott Loach	Watford	Stafford Rangers	Loan
18 September 2007	Will Hoskins	Watford	Millwall	Loan
19 September 2007	Jack Pelter	Unattached	Sunderland	Free
19 September 2007	Gary Cahill	Aston Villa	Sheffield United	Loan
20 September 2007	Joe Anyinsah	Preston North End	Carlisle United	Loan
20 September 2007	Michael Johnson	Derby County	Sheffield Wednesday	Loan
20 September 2007	Scott Laird	Plymouth Argyle	Torquay United	Loan
21 September 2007	Christian Dailly	West Ham United	Southampton	Loan
21 September 2007	Mark Ellis	Bolton Wanderers	Torquay United	Loan
21 September 2007	Simon Gillett	Southampton	Yeovil Town	Loan
21 September 2007	Graham Kavanagh	Sunderland	Sheffield Wednesday	Loan
21 September 2007	Romain Larrieu	Plymouth Argyle	Yeovil Town	Loan
21 September 2007	Russell Saunders	Wigan Athletic	Altrincham	Loan
21 September 2007	Marc Wilson	Portsmouth	AFC Bournemouth	Loan
22 September 2007	Ryan Cresswell	Sheffield United	Rotherham	Loan
25 September 2007	Alex Cisak	Leicester City	Oxford United	Loan
26 September 2007	Lucien Mettomo	Unattached	Southampton	Free
27 September 2007	Ben Alnwick	Tottenham Hotspur	Luton Town	Loan
27 September 2007	Robbie Garrett	Stoke City	Wrexham	Loan
28 September 2007	Sam Collins	Hull City	Swindon Town	Loan
28 September 2007	Frank Fielding	Blackburn Rovers	Wycombe Wanderers	Loan
28 September 2007	Philip Ifil	Tottenham Hotspur	Southampton	Loan
28 September 2007	Przemysław Kazimierczak	Bolton Wanderers	Wycombe Wanderers	Loan
28 September 2007	Dwayne Mattis	Barnsley	Walsall	Loan
28 September 2007	Ben May	Millwall	Scunthorpe United	Loan
28 September 2007	Ronnie Wallwork	West Bromwich Albion	Huddersfield Town	Loan
1 October 2007	Wayne Andrews	Coventry City	Leeds United	Loan
1 October 2007	Felix Bastians	Nottingham Forest	Chesterfield	Loan
1 October 2007	Hamza Bencherif	Nottingham Forest	Lincoln City	Loan
1 October 2007	Adam Legzdins	Birmingham City	Halifax Town	Loan
1 October 2007	Mark de Vries	Leicester City	Leeds United	Loan
2 October 2007	Corrin Brooks-Meade	Fulham	Darlington	Loan
2 October 2007	Jason Jarrett	Preston North End	Queens Park Rangers	Loan
2 October 2007	Rowan Vine	Birmingham City	Queens Park Rangers	Loan
5 October 2007	Kevin Betsy	Bristol City	Yeovil Town	Loan
5 October 2007	Rhys Evans	Blackpool	Bradford City	Loan
5 October 2007	Nicky Law	Sheffield United	Bradford City	Loan
5 October 2007	Daniel McBreen	Scunthorpe United	York City	Loan
5 October 2007	Dean Sinclair	Charlton Athletic	Cheltenham Town	Loan
5 October 2007	Leslie Thompson	Bolton Wanderers	Stockport County	Loan
8 October 2007	Martin Cranie	Portsmouth	Queens Park Rangers	Loan
9 October 2007	Andrew Davies	Middlesbrough	Southampton	Loan
9 October 2007	Adam Lallana	Southampton	AFC Bournemouth	Loan
9 October 2007	Dean Oliver	Sheffield United	Halifax Town	Loan
10 October 2007	Jordan Rhodes	Ipswich Town	Oxford United	Loan
11 October 2007	Stefan Bailey	Queens Park Rangers	Oxford United	Loan
11 October 2007	Shaleum Logan	Manchester City	Grimsby Town	Loan
12 October 2007	Will Atkinson	Hull City	Port Vale	Loan
12 October 2007	Adam Eckersley	Manchester United	Port Vale	Loan
12 October 2007	John Hartson	West Bromwich Albion	Norwich City	Loan
12 October 2007	Johann Smith	Bolton Wanderers	Darlington	Loan
15 October 2007	Phil Bardsley	Manchester United	Sheffield United	Loan
15 October 2007	Michael Bridges	Hull City	Sydney FC	Loan
16 October 2007	Simon Heslop	Barnsley	Halifax Town	Loan
18 October 2007	Fraizer Campbell	Manchester United	Hull City	Loan
22 October 2007	Tommy Doherty	Queens Park Rangers	Wycombe Wanderers	Loan
22 October 2007	Ian Joyce	Unattached	Watford	Free
23 October 2007	Rab Douglas	Leicester City	Wycombe Wanderers	Loan
23 October 2007	Radostin Kishishev	Leicester City	Leeds United	Loan
23 October 2007	Collins John	Fulham	Leicester City	Loan
25 October 2007	Elliott Bennett	Wolverhampton Wanderers	Crewe Alexandra	Loan
25 October 2007	Kevin Cooper	Cardiff City	Tranmere Rovers	Loan
25 October 2007	Luke Potter	Barnsley	Stafford Rangers	Loan
25 October 2007	Kasper Schmeichel	Manchester City	Cardiff	Loan
29 October 2007	Franck Songo'o	Portsmouth	Crystal Palace	Loan
29 October 2007	Kieron St Aimie	Queens Park Rangers	Oxford United	Loan
30 October 2007	Akos Buzsaky	Plymouth Argyle	Queens Park Rangers	Loan
31 October 2007	Robbie Threlfall	Liverpool	Hereford United	Loan
1 November 2007	Danny Coles	Hull City	Bristol Rovers	Loan
1 November 2007	Ryan Cresswell	Sheffield United	Morecambe	Loan
1 November 2007	John Halls	Reading	Preston North End	Loan
1 November 2007	Craig Lindfield	Liverpool	Notts County	Loan
1 November 2007	Jon Macken	Derby County	Barnsley	Loan
1 November 2007	Danny Pugh	Preston North End	Stoke City	Loan
1 November 2007	Martin Taylor	Birmingham City	Norwich City	Loan
2 November 2007	Leon Cort	Crystal Palace	Stoke City	Loan
2 November 2007	James Henry	Reading	AFC Bournemouth	Loan
2 November 2007	Bryan Hodge	Blackburn Rovers	Millwall	Loan
2 November 2007	Alex Pearce	Reading	AFC Bournemouth	Loan
6 November 2007	Scott Golbourne	Reading	AFC Bournemouth	Loan
6 November 2007	Ian Ross	Sheffield United	Rotherham United	Loan
6 November 2007	Scott Sinclair	Chelsea	Queens Park Rangers	Loan
7 November 2007	Phil Doughty	Blackpool	Macclesfield Town	Loan
8 November 2007	Marc Laird	Manchester City	Port Vale	Loan
8 November 2007	Krystian Pearce	Birmingham City	Notts County	Loan
9 November 2007	Marcus Bignot	Queens Park Rangers	Millwall	Loan
9 November 2007	Shaleum Logan	Manchester City	Scunthorpe United	Loan
9 November 2007	Adam Nowland	Preston North End	Stockport County	Loan
12 November 2007	Mark de Vries	Leicester City	Leeds United	Loan
13 November 2007	Lee Hales	West Ham United	Rushden & Diamonds	Loan
14 November 2007	Lee Collins	Wolverhampton Wanderers	Hereford United	Loan
15 November 2007	Tomi Ameobi	Leeds United	Scunthorpe United	Loan
15 November 2007	Matty Pattison	Newcastle United	Norwich City	Loan
15 November 2007	Marc Wilson	Portsmouth	Luton Town	Loan
16 November 2007	Cedric Baseya	Southampton	Crewe Alexandra	Loan
16 November 2007	Anthony Grant	Chelsea	Luton Town	Loan
16 November 2007	Andy Taylor	Blackburn Rovers	Tranmere Rovers	Loan
19 November 2007	Shaun Derry	Leeds United	Crystal Palace	Loan
20 November 2007	Adam Bygrave	Reading	Gillingham	Loan
20 November 2007	Mohammed Camara	Derby County	Norwich City	Loan
20 November 2007	Bartosz Ślusarski	West Bromwich Albion	Blackpool	Loan
21 November 2007	Andy Barcham	Tottenham Hotspur	Leyton Orient	Loan
21 November 2007	Ched Evans	Manchester City	Norwich City	Loan
21 November 2007	Richard Keogh	Bristol City	Carlisle United	Loan
22 November 2007	Lionel Ainsworth	Hereford United	Watford	Loan
22 November 2007	Anderson de Silva	Everton	Barnsley	Loan
22 November 2007	Shabazz Baidoo	Queens Park Rangers	Gillingham	Loan
22 November 2007	Ashley Barnes	Plymouth Argyle	Oxford United	Loan
22 November 2007	Dean Bowditch	Ipswich Town	Northampton Town	Loan
22 November 2007	Michael D'Agostino	Blackpool	Cheltenham Town	Loan
22 November 2007	Billy Dennehy	Sunderland	Accrington Stanley	Loan
22 November 2007	Ryan Flynn	Liverpool	Hereford United	Loan
22 November 2007	David Gray	Manchester United	Crewe Alexandra	Loan
22 November 2007	Matt Green	Cardiff City	Oxford United	Loan
22 November 2007	Jeff Hughes	Crystal Palace	Peterborough United	Loan
22 November 2007	Phil Jevons	Bristol City	Huddersfield Town	Loan
22 November 2007	Jennison Myrie-Williams	Bristol City	Tranmere Rovers	Loan
22 November 2007	Eddie Nolan	Blackburn Rovers	Hartlepool United	Loan
22 November 2007	Mark Salmon	Wolverhampton Wanderers	Port Vale	Loan
22 November 2007	Dominic Shimmin	Queens Park Rangers	AFC Bournemouth	Loan
22 November 2007	Zoltán Stieber	Aston Villa	Yeovil Town	Loan
22 November 2007	Tony Stokes	West Ham United	Stevenage Borough	Loan
22 November 2007	Peter Sweeney	Stoke City	Walsall	Loan
22 November 2007	John White	Colchester United	Stevenage Borough	Loan
30 November 2007	Alex Campana	Watford	Wealdstone	Loan
6 December 2007	Curtis Aspden	Hull City	Boston United	Loan
10 December 2007	Salif Diao	Unattached	Stoke City	Free
11 December 2007	Chris Arthur	Queens Park Rangers	Hayes & Yeading United	Work experience
11 December 2007	Reece Crowther	Queens Park Rangers	Wealdstone	Work experience
12 December 2007	Radoslav Vasilev	Slavia Sofia	Reading	Undisclosed
14 December 2007	Anthony Mason	Plymouth Argyle	Bridgwater Town	Loan
21 December 2008	Manucho	Petro Atletico	Manchester United	Undisclosed
27 December 2007	Alex Cooper	Ross County	Liverpool	£100k
27 December 2007	James Smith	Liverpool	Stockport County	Loan
1 January 2008	Tamir Cohen	Maccabi Netanya	Bolton Wanderers	Undisclosed
1 January 2008	Franco Di Santo	Audax Italiano	Chelsea	£3.4m
1 January 2008	Adam Eckersley	Manchester United	Port Vale	Free
1 January 2008	Chris Gunter	Cardiff City	Tottenham Hotspur	Undisclosed
1 January 2008	Barry Hayles	Plymouth Argyle	Leicester City	Undisclosed
1 January 2008	Lukas Jutkiewicz	Everton	Plymouth Argyle	Loan
1 January 2008	Scott Laird	Plymouth Argyle	Stevenage Borough	Loan
1 January 2008	Kieran Lee	Manchester United	Queens Park Rangers	Loan
1 January 2008	Scott Loach	Watford	Morecambe	Loan
1 January 2008	Gavin Mahon	Watford	Queens Park Rangers	Loan
1 January 2008	Nery Castillo	Shakhtar Donetsk	Manchester City	Loan
1 January 2008	Mamadou Seck	Sheffield United	Scunthorpe United	Loan
1 January 2008	Gary Speed	Bolton Wanderers	Sheffield United	Loan
1 January 2008	John Welsh	Hull City	Chester City	Loan
2 January 2008	Akos Buzsaky	Plymouth Argyle	Queens Park Rangers	Undisclosed
2 January 2008	Matthew Connolly	Arsenal	Queens Park Rangers	Undisclosed
2 January 2008	Hogan Ephraim	West Ham United	Queens Park Rangers	Undisclosed
2 January 2008	Thomas Harban	Barnsley	Halifax Town	Free
2 January 2008	Nathan Joynes	Barnsley	Halifax Town	Free
2 January 2008	Eric Odhiambo	Leicester City	Dundee United	Loan
3 January 2008	Patrick Agyemang	Preston North End	Queens Park Rangers	£350k
3 January 2008	Michael Barnes	Manchester United	Chesterfield	Loan
3 January 2008	Danny Pugh	Preston North End	Stoke City	£500k
3 January 2008	Leslie Thompson	Bolton Wanderers	Torquay United	Loan
4 January 2008	Ryan Bertrand	Chelsea	Norwich City	Loan
4 January 2008	Mohammed Camara	Derby County	Norwich City	Loan
4 January 2008	Nick Carle	Gençlerbirliği	Bristol City	Undisclosed
4 January 2008	Jermaine Easter	Wycombe Wanderers	Plymouth Argyle	Undisclosed
4 January 2008	Jonny Evans	Manchester United	Sunderland	Loan
4 January 2008	Adrian Forbes	Blackpool	Millwall	Undisclosed
4 January 2008	Fitz Hall	Wigan Athletic	Queens Park Rangers	Undisclosed
4 January 2008	Neil Kilkenny	Birmingham City	Leeds United	Loan
4 January 2008	Sherjill MacDonald	AGOVV Apeldoorn	West Bromwich Albion	£200k
4 January 2008	Shelton Martis	West Bromwich Albion	Scunthorpe United	Loan
4 January 2008	Danny Mills	Manchester City	Derby County	Loan
4 January 2008	Matty Pattison	Newcastle United	Norwich City	Undisclosed
4 January 2008	Emanuel Villa	Tecos UAG	Derby County	£2m
4 January 2008	Stanislav Varga	Sunderland	Burnley	Loan
4 January 2008	Laczko Zsolt	Olympiacos	Leicester City	Loan
5 January 2008	Lionel Ainsworth	Hereford United	Watford	Undisclosed
7 January 2008	Ben Alnwick	Tottenham Hotspur	Leicester City	Loan
7 January 2008	Jonny Hayes	Leicester City	Northampton Town	Loan
7 January 2008	Stephen McPhee	Hull City	Blackpool	Undisclosed
7 January 2008	Michael Poke	Southampton	Torquay United	Loan
7 January 2008	Danijel Subotić	Basel	Portsmouth	Undisclosed
7 January 2008	Ben Tozer	Swindon Town	Newcastle United	Undisclosed
8 January 2008	Gábor Bori	MTK Hungária	Leicester City	Loan
8 January 2008	Danny Coles	Hull City	Bristol Rovers	Undisclosed
8 January 2008	Paul Heckingbottom	Barnsley	Bradford City	Free
8 January 2008	Kevin Horlock	Doncaster Rovers	Scunthorpe United	Free
8 January 2008	Joe Lewis	Norwich City	Peterborough United	£400k
8 January 2008	Richard O'Donnell	Sheffield Wednesday	Rotherham United	Loan
8 January 2008	Scott Spencer	Everton	Yeovil Town	Loan
8 January 2008	Rowan Vine	Birmingham City	Queens Park Rangers	£1m
9 January 2008	Jason Byrne	Cardiff City	Bohemians	Free
9 January 2008	Richard Chaplow	West Bromwich Albion	Preston North End	£800k
9 January 2008	John Halls	Reading	Crystal Palace	Loan
9 January 2008	Chris Herd	Aston Villa	Port Vale	Loan
9 January 2008	Marc Laird	Manchester City	Millwall	Free
9 January 2008	Diego León	Grasshopper Zürich	Barnsley	Free
9 January 2008	Fran Mérida	Arsenal	Real Sociedad	Loan
9 January 2008	Dave Mulligan	Scunthorpe United	Port Vale	Loan
9 January 2008	Robbie Savage	Blackburn Rovers	Derby County	£1.5m
10 January 2008	Chris Brown	Norwich City	Preston North End	Undisclosed
10 January 2008	David Button	Tottenham Hotspur	Grays Athletic	Loan
10 January 2008	Alex Cisak	Leicester City	Tamworth	Loan
10 January 2008	Chris Coyne	Luton Town	Colchester United	£350k
10 January 2008	Andrew Davies	Middlesbrough	Southampton	Undisclosed
10 January 2008	Peter Enckelman	Blackburn Rovers	Cardiff City	Loan
10 January 2008	Ryan Hall	Crystal Palace	Dagenham & Redbridge	Loan
10 January 2008	Phil Ifil	Tottenham Hotspur	Colchester United	Undisclosed
10 January 2008	Darren Kenton	Leicester City	Leeds United	Loan
10 January 2008	Mark Little	Wolverhampton Wanderers	Northampton Town	Loan
10 January 2008	Lee Martin	Manchester United	Sheffield United	Loan
10 January 2008	Peter Sweeney	Stoke City	Leeds United	Free
11 January 2008	Nicolas Anelka	Bolton Wanderers	Chelsea	£15m
11 January 2008	Steve Brooker	Bristol City	Cheltenham Town	Loan
11 January 2008	Ryan Dickson	Plymouth Argyle	Brentford	Undisclosed
11 January 2008	Sylvan Ebanks-Blake	Plymouth Argyle	Wolverhampton Wanderers	£1.5m
11 January 2008	Manuel Fernandes	Valencia	Everton	Loan
11 January 2008	Yoann Folly	Sheffield Wednesday	Plymouth Argyle	Undisclosed
11 January 2008	Hossam Ghaly	Tottenham Hotspur	Derby County	Loan
11 January 2008	Max Gradel	Leicester City	AFC Bournemouth	Loan
11 January 2008	Lee Holmes	Derby County	Walsall	Loan
11 January 2008	Mark King	Blackburn Rovers	Accrington Stanley	Free
11 January 2008	Ian Miller	Ipswich Town	Darlington	Free
11 January 2008	Matthew Mills	Manchester City	Doncaster Rovers	Loan
11 January 2008	Bondz Ngala	West Ham United	Weymouth	Loan
11 January 2008	Matt Oakley	Derby County	Leicester City	£500k
11 January 2008	Wilson Palacios	Club Deportivo Olimpia	Wigan Athletic	Undisclosed
11 January 2008	Laurent Robert	Unattached	Derby County	Free
11 January 2008	Alex Russell	Bristol City	Cheltenham Town	Loan
11 January 2008	Martin Škrtel	Zenit St Petersburg	Liverpool	Undisclosed
11 January 2008	Ronnie Wallwork	West Bromwich Albion	Sheffield Wednesday	Free
14 January 2008	Gérald Cid	Bolton Wanderers	Nice	Undisclosed
14 January 2008	Leon Cort	Crystal Palace	Stoke City	£1.2m
14 January 2008	David Edwards	Luton Town	Wolverhampton Wanderers	£675k
14 January 2008	Tininho	West Bromwich Albion	Barnsley	Loan
14 January 2008	James Walker	Charlton Athletic	Southend United	£200k
15 January 2008	Dan Gosling	Plymouth Argyle	Everton	£2m
15 January 2008	Evan Horwood	Sheffield United	Carlisle United	Free
15 January 2008	Jean-Yves Mvoto	Paris Saint-Germain	Sunderland	Undisclosed
15 January 2008	Danny Pugh	Preston North End	Stoke City	£500k
16 January 2008	Chris Clark	Aberdeen	Plymouth Argyle	£200k
16 January 2008	Asa Hall	Birmingham City	Shrewsbury Town	Loan
16 January 2008	Clint Hill	Stoke City	Crystal Palace	Undisclosed
16 January 2008	Branislav Ivanović	Lokomotiv Moscow	Chelsea	Undisclosed
16 January 2008	David Murphy	Hibernian	Birmingham City	£1.5m
16 January 2008	Stephen O'Halloran	Aston Villa	Southampton	Loan
16 January 2008	Grétar Steinsson	AZ Alkmaar	Bolton Wanderers	£3.5m
17 January 2008	Shabazz Baidoo	Queens Park Rangers	Dagenham & Redbridge	Free
17 January 2008	Febian Brandy	Manchester United	Swansea City	Loan
17 January 2008	Damien Delaney	Hull City	Queens Park Rangers	Undisclosed
17 January 2008	Lassana Diarra	Arsenal	Portsmouth	Undisclosed
17 January 2008	Maynor Figueroa	Deportivo Olimpia	Wigan Athletic	Loan
17 January 2008	Tobias Mikaelsson	Aston Villa	Port Vale	Loan
17 January 2008	Stuart Nicholson	West Bromwich Albion	Wrexham	Loan
17 January 2008	Jordan Parkes	Watford	Brentford	Loan
17 January 2008	Matt Richards	Ipswich Town	Brighton & Hove Albion	Loan
17 January 2008	Matty Taylor	Portsmouth	Bolton Wanderers	Undisclosed
18 January 2008	Moses Ashikodi	Watford	Swindon Town	Loan
18 January 2008	Calum Davenport	West Ham United	Watford	Loan
18 January 2008	Phil Doughty	Blackpool	Accrington Stanley	Loan
18 January 2008	Ugo Ehiogu	Rangers	Sheffield United	Free
18 January 2008	Brede Hangeland	FC Copenhagen	Fulham	Undisclosed
18 January 2008	Craig Lindfield	Liverpool	Chester City	Loan
18 January 2008	Steve MacLean	Cardiff City	Plymouth Argyle	£500k
18 January 2008	James McFadden	Everton	Birmingham City	£5m
18 January 2008	Anthony McNamee	Watford	Swindon Town	Undisclosed
18 January 2008	Ryan Shawcross	Manchester United	Stoke City	£1m
18 January 2008	Andy Taylor	Blackburn Rovers	Tranmere Rovers	Undisclosed
18 January 2008	Djimi Traoré	Portsmouth	Rennes	Loan
18 January 2008	Antonio Valencia	Villarreal	Wigan Athletic	Undisclosed
19 January 2008	Andy Gray	Burnley	Charlton Athletic	Loan
19 January 2008	Alan Quinn	Sheffield United	Ipswich Town	Loan
21 January 2008	Patrick Boyle	Everton	Crewe Alexandra	Loan
21 January 2008	Martin Donnelly	Sheffield United	Rochdale	Loan
21 January 2008	Lewis Grabban	Crystal Palace	Millwall	£150k
21 January 2008	Rob Page	Coventry City	Huddersfield Town	Free
21 January 2008	Osei Sankofa	Charlton Athletic	Brentford	Loan
21 January 2008	Ben Starosta	Sheffield United	Bradford City	Loan
21 January 2008	Mauro Zárate	Al-Sadd	Birmingham City	Loan
22 January 2008	Leon Andreasen	Werder Bremen	Fulham	Undisclosed
22 January 2008	Phil Bardsley	Manchester United	Sunderland	£2m
22 January 2008	Neil Danns	Birmingham City	Crystal Palace	£600k
22 January 2008	Shaun Derry	Leeds United	Crystal Palace	Undisclosed
22 January 2008	Rhys Evans	Blackpool	Millwall	Loan
22 January 2008	Jonathan Flynn	Ballymena United	Blackburn Rovers	Undisclosed
23 January 2008	Rolando Bianchi	Manchester City	Lazio	Loan
23 January 2008	Erik Edman	Rennes	Wigan Athletic	Undisclosed
23 January 2008	David Howland	Birmingham City	Port Vale	Loan
23 January 2008	Eddie Johnson	Major League Soccer (Kansas City Wizards)	Fulham	Undisclosed
23 January 2008	Rade Prica	Aalborg BK	Sunderland	£2m
23 January 2008	Mile Sterjovski	Gençlerbirliği	Derby County	Undisclosed
24 January 2008	Jamie Mackie	Exeter City	Plymouth Argyle	£145k
24 January 2008	György Sándor	Újpest	Plymouth Argyle	Loan
25 January 2008	Lee Barnard	Tottenham Hotspur	Southend United	Loan
25 January 2008	Paul Gerrard	Sheffield United	Blackpool	Loan
25 January 2008	Andy Gray	Burnley	Charlton Athletic	£1.5m
25 January 2008	Matt Green	Cardiff City	Oxford United	Loan
25 January 2008	Jack Hobbs	Liverpool	Scunthorpe United	Loan
25 January 2008	Collins John	Fulham	Watford	Loan
25 January 2008	Marlon King	Watford	Wigan Athletic	Undisclosed
25 January 2008	John Paul Kissock	Everton	Gretna	Loan
25 January 2008	Denny Landzaat	Wigan Athletic	Feyenoord	£1m
27 January 2008	Milan Baroš	Lyon	Portsmouth	Loan
28 January 2008	Will Atkinson	Hull City	Mansfield Town	Loan
28 January 2008	Daniel Fox	Walsall	Coventry City	Undisclosed
28 January 2008	Jimmy Kébé	Lens	Reading	Undisclosed
28 January 2008	Scott Loach	Watford	Bradford City	Loan
28 January 2008	Jon Macken	Derby County	Barnsley	Undisclosed
28 January 2008	Sammy Moore	Ipswich Town	Stevenage Borough	Free
28 January 2008	Jonathan Woodgate	Middlesbrough	Tottenham	Undisclosed
29 January 2008	Simon Church	Reading	Yeovil Town	Loan
29 January 2008	Andrew Cole	Sunderland	Burnley	Loan
29 January 2008	Jason Jarrett	Preston North End	Oldham Athletic	Loan
29 January 2008	Georgios Samaras	Manchester City	Celtic	Loan
29 January 2008	Mohamed Sissoko	Liverpool	Juventus	£8.2m
29 January 2008	Josh Walker	Middlesbrough	Aberdeen	Loan
29 January 2008	Simon Walton	Queens Park Rangers	Hull City	Loan
29 January 2008	Ben Wilkinson	Hull City	Gretna	Loan
30 January 2008	Neil Alexander	Ipswich Town	Rangers	Undisclosed
30 January 2008	Gary Cahill	Aston Villa	Bolton Wanderers	Undisclosed
30 January 2008	Christian Dailly	West Ham United	Rangers	Free
30 January 2008	Luke Freeman	Gillingham	Arsenal	£200k
30 January 2008	Michael Hart	Aberdeen	Preston North End	Undisclosed
30 January 2008	Alan Hutton	Rangers	Tottenham Hotspur	£9m
30 January 2008	Kevin Kyle	Coventry City	Wolverhampton Wanderers	Loan
30 January 2008	TJ Moncur	Fulham	Bradford City	Loan
30 January 2008	Carl Pentney	Leicester City	Ilkeston Town	Loan
30 January 2008	Adrian Pettigrew	Chelsea	Rotherham United	Loan
30 January 2008	Jaime Peters	Ipswich Town	Yeovil Town	Loan
30 January 2008	Alex Revell	Brighton & Hove Albion	Southend United	£150k
30 January 2008	Hal Robson-Kanu	Reading	Southend United	Loan
30 January 2008	Neal Trotman	Oldham Athletic	Preston North End	£500k
31 January 2008	Afonso Alves	Heerenveen	Middlesbrough	Undisclosed
31 January 2008	Anderson de Silva	Everton	Barnsley	Undisclosed
31 January 2008	Curtis Aspden	Hull City	Farsley Celtic	Undisclosed
31 January 2008	Matt Bailey	Wolverhampton Wanderers	Kidderminster Harriers	Loan
31 January 2008	Matthew Bates	Middlesbrough	Norwich City	Loan
31 January 2008	Elliott Bennett	Wolverhampton Wanderers	Bury	Loan
31 January 2008	Kevin Betsy	Bristol City	Walsall	Loan
31 January 2008	Leigh Bromby	Sheffield United	Watford	£600k
31 January 2008	Stephen Bywater	Derby County	Ipswich Town	Loan
31 January 2008	Felipe Caicedo	FC Basel	Manchester City	Undisclosed
31 January 2008	Roy Carroll	Rangers	Derby County	Free
31 January 2008	Jamie Clapham	Wolverhampton Wanderers	Leicester City	Free
31 January 2008	Billy Clarke	Ipswich Town	Falkirk	Loan
31 January 2008	Nick Colgan	Barnsley	Ipswich Town	Free
31 January 2008	Sam Collins	Hull City	Hartlepool United	Undisclosed
31 January 2008	Lee Cook	Fulham	Charlton Athletic	Loan
31 January 2008	Simon Cox	Reading	Swindon Town	Undisclosed
31 January 2008	Ousmane Dabo	Manchester City	Lazio	Undisclosed
31 January 2008	Michal Daněk	Viktoria Plzeň	West Bromwich Albion	Loan
31 January 2008	Scott Dann	Walsall	Coventry City	Undisclosed
31 January 2008	Steven Davis	Fulham	Rangers	Loan
31 January 2008	Jermain Defoe	Tottenham Hotspur	Portsmouth	Loan
31 January 2008	Stuart Elliott	Hull City	Doncaster Rovers	Loan
31 January 2008	George Elokobi	Colchester United	Wolverhampton Wanderers	Undisclosed
31 January 2008	John Eustace	Stoke City	Watford	£250k
31 January 2008	Paul Gallagher	Blackburn Rovers	Stoke City	Loan
31 January 2008	Anthony Gardner	Tottenham Hotspur	Everton	Loan
31 January 2008	Kieran Gibbs	Arsenal	Norwich City	Loan
31 January 2008	Gilberto	Hertha Berlin	Tottenham Hotspur	Undisclosed
31 January 2008	Anthony Grant	Chelsea	Southend United	Loan
31 January 2008	Rostyn Griffiths	Blackburn Rovers	Gretna	Loan
31 January 2008	Erik Hagen	Zenit St Petersburg	Wigan Athletic	Loan
31 January 2008	Greg Halford	Sunderland	Charlton Athletic	Loan
31 January 2008	Dean Hammond	Brighton & Hove Albion	Colchester United	£250k
31 January 2008	James Henry	Reading	Norwich City	Loan
31 January 2008	Geoff Horsfield	Sheffield United	Scunthorpe United	Loan
31 January 2008	Ben Hutchinson	Middlesbrough	Celtic	Undisclosed
31 January 2008	Besian Idrizaj	Liverpool	Oldham Athletic	Loan
31 January 2008	Ryan Jarvis	Norwich City	Notts County	Loan
31 January 2008	Toni Kallio	Young Boys	Fulham	Undisclosed
31 January 2008	Graham Kavanagh	Sunderland	Sheffield Wednesday	Loan
31 January 2008	Przemysław Kazimierczak	Bolton Wanderers	Hartlepool United	Undisclosed
31 January 2008	Darren Kenton	Leicester City	Leeds United	Undisclosed
31 January 2008	Artur Krysak	Birmingham City	Gretna	Loan
31 January 2008	Scott Laird	Plymouth Argyle	Stevenage Borough	Undisclosed
31 January 2008	Simon Lappin	Norwich City	Motherwell	Loan
31 January 2008	Jari Litmanen	Malmö	Fulham	Free
31 January 2008	David Livermore	Hull City	Oldham Athletic	Loan
31 January 2008	Manucho	Manchester United	Panathinaikos	Loan
31 January 2008	Dave Martin	Crystal Palace	Millwall	£50k
31 January 2008	Alan Maybury	Leicester City	Aberdeen	Loan
31 January 2008	Billy McKay	Leicester City	Hinckley United	Loan
31 January 2008	Rhys Meynell	Gretna	Barnsley	Loan
31 January 2008	Ľubomír Michalík	Bolton Wanderers	Leeds United	Undisclosed
31 January 2008	Ishmael Miller	Manchester City	West Bromwich Albion	£900k
31 January 2008	Charlie Mulgrew	Wolverhampton Wanderers	Southend United	Loan
31 January 2008	David Norris	Plymouth Argyle	Ipswich Town	Undisclosed
31 January 2008	Lewin Nyatanga	Derby County	Barnsley	Loan
31 January 2008	Jim Paterson	Motherwell	Plymouth Argyle	Undisclosed
31 January 2008	Alex Pearce	Reading	Norwich City	Loan
31 January 2008	Krystian Pearce	Birmingham City	Port Vale	Loan
31 January 2008	Lee Peltier	Liverpool	Yeovil Town	Undisclosed
31 January 2008	Mark Randall	Arsenal	Burnley	Loan
31 January 2008	Grzegorz Rasiak	Southampton	Bolton Wanderers	Loan
31 January 2008	Andy Reid	Charlton Athletic	Sunderland	£4m
31 January 2008	David Rozehnal	Newcastle United	Lazio	Loan
31 January 2008	Alan Sheehan	Leicester City	Leeds United	Loan
31 January 2008	Enoch Showunmi	Bristol City	Sheffield Wednesday	Loan
31 January 2008	Rudi Skácel	Southampton	Hertha Berlin	Loan
31 January 2008	Paul Stalteri	Tottenham Hotspur	Fulham	Loan
31 January 2008	Alan Stubbs	Everton	Derby County	Free
31 January 2008	Shane Supple	Ipswich Town	Falkirk	Loan
31 January 2008	Cleveland Taylor	Scunthorpe United	Carlisle United	£50k
31 January 2008	Aswad Thomas	Charlton Athletic	Accrington Stanley	Loan
31 January 2008	Tony Warner	Fulham	Barnsley	Loan
31 January 2008	Glenn Whelan	Sheffield Wednesday	Stoke City	£500k

== See also ==
- List of English football transfers Summer 2007
- List of English football transfers Summer 2008

== Notes and references ==
- "Transfers – September 2007". BBC Sport. 29 September 2007.
- "Transfers – October 2007". BBC Sport. 31 October 2007.
- "Transfers – November 2007". BBC Sport. 30 November 2007.
- "Transfers – December 2007". BBC Sport. 31 December 2007.
- "Transfers – January 2008". BBC Sport. 1 February 2008.
