= 2007–08 Blackpool F.C. season =

English football club season

Blackpool F.C.
2007–08 season
- Owner: Owen Oyston
- Chairman: Karl Oyston
- Manager: Simon Grayson
- Ground: Bloomfield Road
- Championship: 19th
- FA Cup: Third round
- League Cup: Fourth round
- Top goalscorer: League: Ben Burgess (9); All: Ben Burgess (10)
- Highest home attendance: 9,640 vs Watford, Championship, 4 May 2008
- Lowest home attendance: 6,648 vs Cardiff City, Championship, 11 December 2007
- Average home league attendance: 8,861
- Biggest win: 4–0 v Coventry City, Championship, 22 December 2007
- Biggest defeat: 1–4 v Charlton Athletic, Championship, 12 January 2008; 0–3 v Plymouth Argyle, Championship, 26 April 2008

The 2007–08 season was Blackpool F.C.'s 100th season (97th consecutive) in the Football League. It was their first season back in the second tier of English football in 29 years. They finished nineteenth, the club's highest-placed finish in the Football League in 30 years.

Ben Burgess was the club's top scorer, with ten goals overall.

Blackpool set a new club record of twelve consecutive victories, carrying over from the end of the previous season, with 0–1 and 1–0 results over Leicester City and Huddersfield Town, respectively.

At the end of the season, manager Simon Grayson released eleven players, most of whom had not featured in the first team this season, and on 30 May he confirmed that he wanted to sign at least six new players. He went on to sign twelve (including three on loan) before the start of the 2008–09 season.

== First-team squad ==
Squad No.	Name	Position(s)	Nationality	Place of birth	Date of Birth	Apps	Goals	Signed from	Date signed	Fee
Goalkeepers
1	Paul Rachubka	GK	(United States) (England)	San Luis Obispo	21 May 1981 (aged 26)	11	0	(England) Huddersfield Town	5 June 2007 (Note: Player had a previous loan spell at the club. Date of signing refers to the date of the player's first permanent spell at the club.)	Free
13	Kyle Clancy	GK	(England)	Barking	16 November 1989 (aged 17)	0	0	(England) Blackpool F.C. Academy	July 2006	Free
21	Rhys Evans	GK	(England)	Swindon	27 January 1982 (aged 25)	39	0	(England) Swindon Town	1 July 2006	Free
21	Pāvels Šteinbors	GK	(Latvia)	Riga	21 September 1985 (aged 21)	0	0	(Latvia) FK Jūrmala	1 January 2008	Loan
23	Lewis Edge	GK	(England)	Morecambe	12 January 1987 (aged 20)	6	0	(England) Blackpool F.C. Academy	November 2003	Free
36	Paul Gerrard	GK	(England)	Heywood	22 January 1973 (aged 34)	0	0	(England) Sheffield United	24 January 2008	Loan
38	Scott Flinders	GK	(England)	Rotherham	12 June 1986 (aged 20)	0	0	(England) Crystal Palace	27 March 2008	Loan
Defenders
2	Danny Coid	RB/LB/CM	(England)	Liverpool	3 October 1981 (aged 25)	280	14	(England) Blackpool F.C. Academy	1 August 1998	Free
3	Stephen Crainey	LB	(Scotland)	Glasgow	22 June 1981 (aged 25)	0	0	(England) Leeds United	9 July 2007	Free
5	Michael Jackson	CB	(England)	Chester	4 December 1973 (aged 33)	52	2	(England) Tranmere Rovers	23 June 2006	Free
6	Ian Evatt	CB	(England)	Coventry	19 November 1981 (aged 25)	54	1	(England) Queens Park Rangers	5 January 2007	Free
15	John Hills	CB	(England)	St Annes	21 April 1978 (aged 29)	192	20	(England) Sheffield Wednesday	5 July 2007 (Note: Player had three previous spells at the club including one on loan. Date of signing refers to the player's fourth spell at the club.)	Free
17	Kaspars Gorkšs	CB	(Latvia)	Riga	6 November 1981 (aged 25)	13	0	(Latvia) FK Ventspils	1 January 2007	Free
18	Paul Tierney	LB	(England)	Salford	15 September 1982 (aged 24)	13	0	(Scotland) Livingston	2 June 2006	Free
19	Phil Doughty	CB	(England)	Blackpool	6 September 1986 (aged 20)	4	0	(England) Blackpool F.C. Academy	1 December 2002	Free
24	Matt Jackson	RB	(England)	Leeds	19 October 1971 (aged 35)	0	0	(England) Watford	1 October 2007	Loan
24	Tony McMahon	RB	(England)	Bishop Auckland	24 March 1986 (aged 21)	0	0	(England) Middlesbrough	10 November 2007	Loan
25	Shaun Barker	RB/CB	(England)	Trowell	19 September 1982 (aged 24)	55	6	(England) Rotherham United	2 August 2006	Free
31	Joe Martin	LB/LM	(England)	Dagenham	29 November 1988 (aged 18)	0	0	(England) Tottenham Hotspur	27 March 2008	Loan
Midfielders
4	Keith Southern	DM/CM	(England)	Gateshead	24 April 1984 (aged 23)	204	22	(England) Everton	8 November 2002	Undisclosed
8	Adrian Forbes	RM	(England)	Greenford	23 January 1979 (aged 28)	43	1	(England) Swansea City	1 July 2006	Free
10	Stuart Green	CM	(England)	Whitehaven	15 June 1981 (aged 25)	0	0	(England) Crystal Palace	31 January 2008	Free
11	Wes Hoolahan	LM/RM	(Republic of Ireland)	Dublin	10 August 1983 (aged 23)	49	10	(Scotland) Livingston	10 August 2007	£75,000
14	David Fox	CM/DM	(England)	Leek	13 November 1983 (aged 23)	52	5	(England) Manchester United	January 2006	Free
16	Claus Jørgensen	CM/AM	(Faroe Islands) (Denmark)	Holstebro	27 April 1979 (aged 28)	39	2	(England) Coventry City	8 September 2006	Free
20	Andy Welsh	LM	(Scotland)	Manchester	24 November 1983 (aged 23)	0	0	(Canada) Toronto FC	31 August 2007	Free
22	Marcus Bean	CM	(Jamaica)	Bournemouth	2 November 1984 (aged 22)	27	1	(England) Queens Park Rangers	24 January 2006	Free
26	Simon Wiles	CM	(England)	Preston	22 April 1985 (aged 22)	48	3	(England) Blackpool F.C. Academy	14 October 2003	Free
28	Michael Flynn	CM	(Wales)	Newport	17 October 1980 (aged 26)	7	0	(England) Gillingham	5 July 2007	Free
29	Matty Kay	CM	(England)	Blackpool	12 October 1989 (aged 17)	1	0	(England) Blackpool F.C. Academy	13 November 2005	Free
30	Matt Lawlor	CM	(England)		20 August 1988 (aged 18)	0	0	Blackpool F.C. Academy	1 July 2007	Free
33	Michael D'Agostino	RM	(Canada)	Vancouver	7 January 1987 (aged 20)	0	0	Free agency	September 2007	Free
Forwards
7	Keigan Parker	ST	(Scotland)	Livingston	8 June 1982 (aged 24)	140	41	(Scotland) St Johnstone	25 June 2004	Free
8	Stephen McPhee	ST	(Scotland)	Glasgow	5 June 1981 (aged 25)	0	0	(England) Hull City	7 January 2008	£215,000
9	Andy Morrell	ST	(England)	Doncaster	28 September 1974 (aged 32)	48	20	(England) Coventry City	15 August 2006	Free
10	Scott Vernon	ST	(England)	Manchester	13 December 1983 (aged 23)	68	19	(England) Oldham Athletic	9 June 2005	Part-exchange
12	Gary Taylor-Fletcher	ST/RW/LW	(England)	Widnes	4 June 1981 (aged 25)	0	0	(England) Huddersfield Town	9 July 2007	Undisclosed
24	Grant Holt	ST	(England)	Carlisle	12 April 1981 (aged 26)	0	0	(England) Nottingham Forest	21 March 2008	Loan
27	Ben Burgess	ST	(Republic of Ireland) (England)	Buxton	9 November 1981 (aged 25)	32	5	(England) Hull City	31 August 2006	£100,000
32	Phil Marsh	ST	(England)	St Helens	15 November 1986 (aged 20)	0	0	(England) Manchester United	5 September 2007	Free
34	Bartosz Ślusarski	ST	(Poland)	Szamocin	11 December 1981 (aged 25)	0	0	(England) West Bromwich Albion	20 November 2007	Loan
35	Danny Mitchley	ST	(England)	Liverpool	7 October 1989 (aged 17)	0	0	(England) Blackpool F.C. Academy	4 March 2008	Free
37	Paul Dickov	ST	(Scotland)	Livingston	1 November 1972 (aged 34)	0	0	(England) Manchester City	31 January 2008	Loan

== Pre-season ==
25 July 2007 Friendly	Blackpool	1–2	Wigan Athletic	Blackpool, England
19:45 BST		Report		Stadium: Bloomfield Road

28 July 2007 Friendly	Livingston	1–1	Blackpool	Livingston, Scotland
15:00 BST		Report		Stadium: Almondvale Stadium

31 July 2007 Friendly	Bradford City	1–2	Blackpool	Bradford, England
19:45 BST		Report		Stadium: Valley Parade

3 August 2007 Friendly	Carlisle United	1–2	Blackpool	Carlisle, England
15:00 BST		Report		Stadium: Brunton Park

== Season proper ==
=== Football League Championship ===
==== League table ====
Pos	Team	Pld	W	D	L	GF	GA	GD	Pts
17	Norwich City	46	15	10	21	49	59	−10	55
18	Barnsley	46	14	13	19	52	65	−13	55
19	Blackpool	46	12	18	16	59	64	−5	54
20	Southampton	46	13	15	18	56	72	−16	54
21	Coventry City	46	14	11	21	52	64	−12	53

Updated to match(es) played on 4 May 2008. Source: The Football League
Rules for classification: 1) points; 2) goal difference; 3) number of goals scored.

==== Results ====
===== In summary =====
Overall								Home						Away					
Pld	W	D	L	GF	GA	GD	Pts	W	D	L	GF	GA	GD	W	D	L	GF	GA	GD
46	12	18	16	59	64	−5	54	8	11	4	35	27	+8	4	7	12	24	37	−13

Source: Sky

===== By matchday =====
Matchday	1	2	3	4	5	6	7	8	9	10	11	12	13	14	15	16	17	18	19	20	21	22	23	24	25	26	27	28	29	30	31	32	33	34	35	36	37	38	39	40	41	42	43	44	45	46
Ground	A	H	A	H	A	H	H	A	A	H	H	A	A	A	H	A	H	H	A	A	H	H	H	A	A	H	A	H	A	H	A	H	A	H	A	H	H	A	H	A	A	H	A	H	A	H
Result	W	D	L	W	D	D	D	D	L	D	D	L	L	L	W	L	L	W	D	W	L	L	W	D	W	W	L	D	L	W	D	D	L	W	W	D	D	L	D	D	D	L	L	W	L	D
Position	7	8	14	8	6	9	9	10	13	16	15	18	20	22	19	21	21	21	21	18	18	18	17	17	17	14	16	15	15	15	16	15	15	14	12	12	12	13	15	16	16	17	18	16	18	19

Updated to match(es) played on 04 May 2008. Source: 11v11
A = Away; H = Home; W = Win; D = Draw; L = Loss

===== In detail =====
11 August 2007 1	Leicester City	0–1	Blackpool	Leicester
15:00 BST		Report	Southern 63'	Stadium: Walkers Stadium; Attendance: 26,650; Referee: Andy D'Urso

18 August 2007 2	Blackpool	1–1	Bristol City	Blackpool
15:00 BST	Morrell 52'; Jackson (yellow card) 76'	Report	Murray 75'	Stadium: Bloomfield Road; Attendance: 8,983; Referee: Colin Webster

25 August 2007 3	Wolverhampton Wanderers	2–1	Blackpool	Wolverhampton
15:00 BST	Potter (yellow card) 30'; Olofinjana (yellow card) 53'; Eastwood 69', 78'	Report	Taylor-Fletcher 51'; Southern (yellow card) 62'; Barker (yellow card) 75'	Stadium: Molineux; Attendance: 24,294; Referee: Trevor Kettle

3 September 2007 4	Blackpool	2–1	Hull City	Blackpool
19:45 BST	Jackson (yellow card) 43'; Taylor-Fletcher 47'; Gorkšs (yellow card) 66'; Burgess 90', (yellow card) 90'	Report	Garcia (yellow card) 41'; Ashbee 50'	Stadium: Bloomfield Road; Attendance: 7,902; Referee: Kevin Friend

15 September 2007 5	Burnley	2–2	Blackpool	Burnley
15:00 BST	Jones 52'; Akinbiyi 86'; Hoolahan 73' (pen.); Morrell 90'	Report	Garcia (yellow card) 41'; Ashbee 50'	Stadium: Turf Moor; Attendance: 16,834; Referee: Mike Dean

18 September 2007 6	Blackpool	2–2	Sheffield United	Blackpool
19:45 BST	Crainey 45'; Burgess 87'	Report	Beattie 13', 88'	Stadium: Bloomfield Road; Attendance: 9,512; Referee: Mark Halsey

22 September 2007 7	Blackpool	2–2	Colchester United	Blackpool
15:00 BST	Morrell 54'; Barker 84'	Report	Yeates 63', 86'; Elokobi (yellow card) 45'	Stadium: Bloomfield Road; Attendance: 7,959; Referee: Scott Mathieson

29 September 2007 8	Watford	1–1	Blackpool	Watford
15:00 BST	Johnson (yellow card) 13', (goal) 41'	Report	Hoolahan 73' (pen.)	Stadium: Vicarage Road; Attendance: 16,580; Referee: Richard Beeby

2 October 2007 9	Coventry City	3–1	Blackpool	Coventry
19:45 BST	Ward (yellow card) 36'; Doyle 44' (pen.); Best (yellow card) 45'; Simpson (yellow card) 62', (goal) 86'; Hughes (yellow card) 63'; Mifsud 69'	Report	Morrell 32'; Gorkšs (yellow card) 45' (yellow-red card) 81'; Taylor-Fletcher (yellow card) 59'	Stadium: Ricoh Arena; Attendance: 15,803; Referee: Mike Thorpe

6 October 2007 10	Blackpool	0–0	Plymouth Argyle	Blackpool
15:00 BST	Hoolahan (yellow card) 63'; Welsh (yellow card) 87'	Report	Nalis (yellow card) 67'	Stadium: Bloomfield Road; Attendance: 8,784; Referee: Jonathan Moss

20 October 2007 11	Blackpool	1–1	Crystal Palace	Blackpool
15:00 BST	Barker (yellow card) 27'; Fox 69'	Report	Craig (yellow card) 48'; Soares 59', (red card) 88'	Stadium: Bloomfield Road; Attendance: 9,037; Referee: Graham Laws

23 October 2007 12	West Bromwich Albion	2–1	Blackpool	West Bromwich
19:45 BST	Miller 22'; Robinson (yellow card) 26'; Morrison 79'	Report	Vernon 31'; Parker (yellow card) 35'	Stadium: The Hawthorns; Attendance: 22,030; Referee: Mike Pike

27 October 2007 13	Sheffield Wednesday	2–1	Blackpool	Sheffield
15:00 BST	Whelan (yellow card) 65'; Tudgay 66'; Hinds 71'	Report	Southern (yellow card) 14'; Hoolahan 37'; Barker (yellow card) 62'	Stadium: Hillsborough; Attendance: 19,238; Referee: Graeme Atkins

5 November 2007 14	Barnsley	2–1	Blackpool	Barnsley
19:45 GMT	Howard 21' (pen.); Taylor-Fletcher 70' (o.g.)	Report	Jackson (yellow card) 36' (yellow-red card) 52'; Southern 72'	Stadium: Oakwell; Attendance: 8,531; Referee: Paul Taylor

10 November 2007 15	Blackpool	1–0	Scunthorpe United	Blackpool
15:00 GMT	Barker (yellow card) 61'; Parker (yellow card) 67'; Gorkšs 73'	Report		Stadium: Bloomfield Road; Attendance: 8,051; Referee: Andy Hall

24 November 2007 16	Southampton	1–0	Blackpool	Southampton
15:00 GMT	John 35'	Report		Stadium: St Mary's Stadium; Attendance: 21,075; Referee: Iain Williamson

27 November 2007 17	Blackpool	1–3	Norwich City	Blackpool
19:45 GMT	Slusarski 38'	Report	Dublin 30', 90', (yellow card) 35'; Taylor 74'; Fotheringham (yellow card) 80'; Otsemobor (yellow card) 81'	Stadium: Bloomfield Road; Attendance: 7,759; Referee: Mark Haywood

1 December 2007 18	Blackpool	1–0	Queens Park Rangers	Blackpool
15:00 GMT	Burgess 90'	Report	Buzsaky (yellow card) 75'; Rowlands (yellow card) 80'	Stadium: Bloomfield Road; Attendance: 8,527; Referee: Clive Oliver

3 December 2007 19	Scunthorpe United	1–1	Blackpool	Scunthorpe
20:00 GMT	Butler 19'; Youga (red card) 71'; Sparrow (yellow card) 90'	Report	Flynn 88'	Stadium: Glanford Park; Attendance: 4,407; Referee: Andy D'Urso

8 December 2007 20	Preston North End	0–1	Blackpool	Preston
12:30 GMT	Mawene (yellow card) 67'; Sedgwick (yellow card) 69'; Jones (yellow card) 83'; McKenna (yellow card) 89'	Report	Hoolahan 68' (pen.); Gorkšs (yellow card) 86'; Evatt (yellow card) 90'	Stadium: Deepdale; Attendance: 17,807; Referee: Mark Clattenburg

11 December 2007 21	Blackpool	0–1	Cardiff City	Blackpool
19:45 GMT		Report	Thompson 14'; Loovens (yellow card) 64'	Stadium: Bloomfield Road; Attendance: 7,214; Referee: Eddie Ilderton

15 December 2007 22	Blackpool	2–3	Stoke City	Blackpool
15:00 GMT	Flynn 13'; Burgess (yellow card) 79'; Barker 89'	Report	Lawrence (yellow card) 15'; Fuller 37', 61'; Cort 41'; Shawcross (yellow card) 79'	Stadium: Bloomfield Road; Attendance: 9,123; Referee: Eddie Ilderton

22 December 2007 23	Blackpool	4–0	Coventry City	Blackpool
15:00 GMT	Hoolahan 28' (pen.); Jørgensen (yellow card) 39'; Flynn 65'; Gorkšs 72'; Vernon 88'	Report	Kyle (red card) 31'; Doyle (yellow card) 34'; McNamee (yellow card) 41'; Best (yellow card) 74'; Tabb (yellow card) 90'	Stadium: Bloomfield Road; Attendance: 8,690; Referee: Anthony Taylor

26 December 2007 24	Sheffield United	1–1	Blackpool	Sheffield
15:00 GMT	Beattie 23'; Naysmith (yellow card) 55'; Lucketti (yellow card) 68'; Tonge (yellow card) 82'	Report	Evatt (red card) 8'; Jørgensen 69'	Stadium: Bramall Lane; Attendance: 26,409; Referee: Stuart Attwell

29 December 2007 25	Colchester United	0–2	Blackpool	Colchester
15:00 GMT	Virgo (yellow card) 45'	Report	Vernon 26', 36'; Morrell (yellow card) 80'; Barker (yellow card) 90'	Stadium: Layer Road; Attendance: 5,160; Referee: Paul Armstrong

1 January 2008 26	Blackpool	3–0	Burnley	Blackpool
15:00 GMT	Gorkšs 23', (yellow card) 67'; Burgess 59'; Jørgensen 63'	Report	Lafferty (yellow card) 20'; McCann (yellow card) 27'	Stadium: Bloomfield Road; Attendance: 9,599; Referee: Andre Marriner

12 January 2008 27	Charlton Athletic	4–1	Blackpool	Charlton
15:00 GMT	Bougherra 6'; Varney 10'; Zhi 24', 52'	Report	Burgess 12'; Hoolahan (yellow card) 32'	Stadium: The Valley; Attendance: 21,412; Referee: Jarnail Singh

19 January 2008 28	Blackpool	1–1	Ipswich Town	Blackpool
15:00 GMT	Jørgensen 39'	Report	Sito (red card) 63'; Walters 65'	Stadium: Bloomfield Road; Attendance: 9,154; Referee: Mike Pike

26 January 2008 29	Bristol City	1–0	Blackpool	Bristol
15:00 GMT	Elliott 20'; Skuse (yellow card) 78'	Report		Stadium: Ashton Gate; Attendance: 15,465; Referee: Roger East

2 February 2008 30	Blackpool	2–1	Leicester City	Blackpool
15:00 GMT	Taylor-Fletcher 3'; Dickov 90'	Report	Laczko (yellow card) 23'; Howard 62'; Stearman (yellow card) 65'	Stadium: Bloomfield Road; Attendance: 9,298; Referee: Graham Laws

9 February 2008 31	Hull City	2–2	Blackpool	Kingston upon Hull
15:00 GMT	Barmby (yellow card) 45'; Folan 60'; Windass 70'	Report	Burgess (yellow card) 32'; Dickov 39', 50'; Gorkšs (yellow card) 45' (yellow-red card) 83'; Taylor-Fletcher (yellow card) 48'; Jørgensen (yellow card) 84'	Stadium: KC Stadium; Attendance: 18,407; Referee: Jonathan Moss

12 February 2008 32	Blackpool	0–0	Wolverhampton Wanderers	Blackpool
19:45 GMT	Taylor-Fletcher (yellow card) 69'; Evatt (yellow card) 75'	Report	Keogh (yellow card) 63'; Ward (yellow card) 90'	Stadium: Bloomfield Road; Attendance: 9,413; Referee: Lee Mason

16 February 2008 33	Ipswich Town	2–1	Blackpool	Ipswich
15:00 GMT	Sumulikoski 50'; Walters 58'	Report	Dickov 89'	Stadium: Portman Road; Attendance: 21,059; Referee: Fred Graham

23 February 2008 34	Blackpool	5–3	Charlton Athletic	Blackpool
15:00 GMT	McPhee 16'; Gorkšs 26'; Taylor-Fletcher 59', 69'; Dickov 62'	Report	Ambrose 29', 30'; Fortune (yellow card) 37', (goal) 74'	Stadium: Bloomfield Road; Attendance: 9,134; Referee: Colin Webster

1 March 2008 35	Norwich City	1–2	Blackpool	Norwich
15:00 GMT	Cureton 65' (pen.)	Report	McPhee 15', 39'; Morrell (yellow card) 20'	Stadium: Carrow Road; Attendance: 24,531; Referee: Rob Shoebridge

4 March 2008 36	Blackpool	1–1	Barnsley	Blackpool
19:45 GMT	Taylor-Fletcher 20'	Report	Macken (yellow card) 36'; Campbell-Ryce 45'	Stadium: Bloomfield Road; Attendance: 8,080; Referee: Karl Evans

8 March 2008 37	Blackpool	2–2	Southampton	Blackpool
15:00 GMT	Southern 49'; Gorkšs 55'; Taylor-Fletcher (yellow card) 75'	Report	Vignal 31' (pen.); John 63'	Stadium: Bloomfield Road; Attendance: 9,050; Referee: Dave Foster

11 March 2008 38	Queens Park Rangers	3–2	Blackpool	White City
20:00 GMT	Buzsaky 11'; Vine 40'; Rowlands 47'	Report	Taylor-Fletcher (yellow card) 29'; Burgess 60'; Gorkšs 73'; Hoolahan (yellow card) 90'	Stadium: Loftus Road; Attendance: 11,538; Referee: Keith Hill

15 March 2008 39	Blackpool	0–0	Preston North End	Blackpool
12:30 GMT	Evatt (yellow card) 39'	Report	Mawene (yellow card) 28'; McKenna (yellow card) 35'; Jones (yellow card) 42'	Stadium: Bloomfield Road; Attendance: 9,629; Referee: Lee Probert

22 March 2008 40	Stoke City	1–1	Blackpool	Stoke-on-Trent
15:00 GMT	Cort 47'	Report	Burgess 37'; Claus Bech Jørgensen (yellow card) 40'	Stadium: Britannia Stadium; Attendance: 20,019; Referee: Mike Pike

29 March 2008 41	Crystal Palace	0–0	Blackpool	Selhurst
15:00 BST	Sinclair (yellow card) 39'; Soares (yellow card) 40'; Derry (yellow card) 60'; Butterfield (yellow card) 77'	Report	Evatt (yellow card) 40'	Stadium: Selhurst Park; Attendance: 16,028; Referee: Anthony Taylor

8 April 2008 42	Blackpool	1–3	West Bromwich Albion	Blackpool
19:45 BST	Burgess 35'; Dickov (yellow card) 85'	Report	Miller (yellow card) 45', (goal) 87'; Phillips 81' (pen.); Moore (yellow card) 86'	Stadium: Bloomfield Road; Attendance: 9,628; Referee: Jonathan Moss

12 April 2008 43	Cardiff City	3–1	Blackpool	Cardiff
15:00 BST	McPhail 7'; Sinclair 50'; Whittingham 58'	Report	Morrell 73'	Stadium: Ninian Park; Attendance: 14,715; Referee: Tony Bates

19 April 2008 44	Blackpool	2–1	Sheffield Wednesday	Blackpool
15:00 BST	Jørgensen 6'; Dickov 30', (yellow card) 53'; McPhee (yellow card) 44'	Report	Wood 12'; Gilbert (red card) 51'	Stadium: Bloomfield Road; Attendance: 9,633; Referee: Nigel Miller

26 April 2008 45	Plymouth Argyle	3–0	Blackpool	Plymouth
15:00 BST	Easter 4'; Fallon 25', 55'; Smith (yellow card) 90'	Report	Jackson (yellow card) 7'; Hoolahan (yellow card) 32'	Stadium: Home Park; Attendance: 12,911; Referee: Kevin Wright

4 May 2008 46	Blackpool	1–1	Watford	Blackpool
14:00 BST	Burgess 2'	Report	Henderson (yellow card) 6' (yellow-red card) 60'; Smith 62'	Stadium: Bloomfield Road; Attendance: 9,640; Referee: Graham Laws

=== FA Cup ===
5 January 2008 Third Round	Barnsley	2–1	Blackpool	Barnsley
15:00 GMT	Campbell-Ryce (yellow card) 67'; Mossto (yellow card) 72'; Foster 78'; Coulson 81'; Odejayi (yellow card) 82'	Report	Fox 32'; Jørgensen (yellow card) 72'; Crainey (yellow card) 90'	Stadium: Oakwell; Attendance: 8,276; Referee: Michael Jones

=== Football League Cup ===
7 August 2007 First Round	Blackpool	1–0	Huddersfield Town	Blackpool
19:45 BST	Burgess 75'	Report		Stadium: Bloomfield Road; Attendance: 6,395; Referee: Eddie Ilderton

28 August 2007 Second Round	Derby County	2–2 (a.e.t.) (6–7 p)	Blackpool	Derby
19:45 BST	Beardsley (yellow card) 21'; Camara 63'; Fagan 101'	Report	Gorkšs 86', 120'	Stadium: Pride Park; Attendance: 8,658; Referee: Nigel Miller
	Penalties
	Howard (penalty missed); Fagan (penalty scored); Malcolm (penalty missed); Teale (penalty scored); McEveley (penalty scored); Pearson (penalty scored); Bywater (penalty scored); Todd (penalty scored); Moore (penalty missed)		(penalty scored) Fox; (penalty missed) Hoolahan; (penalty missed) Southern; (penalty scored) Evatt; (penalty scored) Parker; (penalty scored) Morrell; (penalty scored) Forbes; (penalty scored) Barker; (penalty scored) Jackson

25 September 2007 Third Round	Blackpool	2–1 (a.e.t.)	Southend United	Blackpool
19:45 BST	Evans (yellow card) 6'; Hills (yellow card) 42'; Hoolahan 81'; Flynn (yellow card) 83'; Jackson 118'	Report	Harrold 7' (pen.), (yellow card) 53'; Black (yellow card) 66'; McCormack (yellow card) 90'	Stadium: Bloomfield Road; Attendance: 5.022; Referee: Michael Jones

31 October 2007 Fourth Round	Tottenham Hotspur	2–0	Blackpool	Tottenham
20:00 GMT	Keane 18'; Kaboul (yellow card) 49'; Chimbonda 58'; Tainio (yellow card) 84'	Report		Stadium: White Hart Lane; Attendance: 32,196; Referee: Chris Foy

== Squad statistics ==
No.	Pos.	Name	League		FA Cup		League Cup		League Trophy		Total		Discipline	
No.	Pos.	Name	Apps	Goals	Apps	Goals	Apps	Goals	Apps	Goals	Apps	Goals	Yellow card	Red card
1	GK	(United States) Paul Rachubka	46	0	1	0	2	0	0	0	49	0	0	0
2	MF	(England) Danny Coid	13	0	0	0	2	0	0	0	15	0	0	0
3	DF	(Scotland) Stephen Crainey	40	1	1	0	2	0	0	0	43	1	1	0
4	MF	(England) Keith Southern	30	3	0	0	2	0	0	0	32	3	2	0
5	DF	(England) Michael Jackson	23	0	1	0	4	1	0	0	28	1	3	1
6	DF	(England) Ian Evatt	29	0	1	0	2	0	0	0	32	0	4	1
7	FW	(England) Keigan Parker	21	0	0	0	4	0	0	0	25	0	2	0
8	MF	(England) Adrian Forbes	2	0	0	0	1	0	0	0	3	0	0	0
8	FW	(Scotland) Stephen McPhee	19	3	0	0	0	0	0	0	19	3	1	0
9	FW	(England) Andy Morrell	28	5	1	0	4	0	0	0	33	5	2	0
10	MF	(England) Stuart Green	6	0	0	0	0	0	0	0	6	0	0	0
10	FW	(England) Scott Vernon	15	4	1	0	3	0	0	0	19	4	0	0
11	MF	(Republic of Ireland) Wes Hoolahan	45	5	1	0	4	1	0	0	50	6	4	0
12	FW	(England) Gary Taylor-Fletcher	42	6	1	0	3	0	0	0	46	6	5	0
13	GK	(England) Kyle Clancy	0	0	0	0	0	0	0	0	0	0	0	0
14	MF	(England) David Fox	28	1	1	1	4	0	0	0	33	2	0	0
15	DF	(England) John Hills	4	0	1	0	3	0	0	0	8	0	1	0
16	MF	(Faroe Islands) Claus Jørgensen	37	4	1	0	0	0	0	0	38	4	4	0
17	DF	(Latvia) Kaspars Gorkšs	40	6	0	0	4	2	0	0	44	8	4	2
18	DF	(Republic of Ireland) Paul Tierney	0	0	0	0	0	0	0	0	0	0	0	0
19	DF	(England) Phil Doughty	0	0	0	0	0	0	0	0	0	0	0	0
20	MF	(Scotland) Andy Welsh	21	0	1	0	2	0	0	0	24	0	1	0
21	GK	(England) Rhys Evans	0	0	0	0	2	0	0	0	2	0	1	0
21	GK	(Latvia) Pāvels Šteinbors	0	0	0	0	0	0	0	0	0	0	0	0
22	MF	(Jamaica) Marcus Bean	0	0	0	0	0	0	0	0	0	0	0	0
23	GK	(England) Lewis Edge	0	0	0	0	0	0	0	0	0	0	0	0
24	FW	(England) Grant Holt	4	0	0	0	0	0	0	0	4	0	0	0
24	DF	(England) Matt Jackson	5	0	0	0	0	0	0	0	5	0	0	0
24	DF	(England) Tony McMahon	2	0	0	0	0	0	0	0	2	0	0	0
25	DF	(England) Shaun Barker	46	2	0	0	4	0	0	0	50	2	5	0
26	MF	(England) Simon Wiles	0	0	0	0	0	0	0	0	0	0	0	0
27	FW	(Republic of Ireland) Ben Burgess	35	9	1	0	1	1	0	0	37	10	3	0
28	MF	(Wales) Michael Flynn	32	3	1	0	3	0	0	0	36	3	1	0
29	MF	(England) Matty Kay	0	0	0	0	0	0	0	0	0	0	0	0
30	MF	(England) Matt Lawlor	0	0	0	0	0	0	0	0	0	0	0	0
31	MF	(England) Joe Martin	1	0	0	0	0	0	0	0	1	0	0	0
32	FW	(England) Phil Marsh	0	0	0	0	0	0	0	0	0	0	0	0
33	MF	(Canada) Michael D'Agostino	0	0	0	0	0	0	0	0	0	0	0	0
34	FW	(Poland) Bartosz Slusarski	6	1	0	0	0	0	0	0	6	1	0	0
36	GK	(England) Paul Gerrard	0	0	0	0	0	0	0	0	0	0	0	0
37	FW	(Scotland) Paul Dickov	11	6	0	0	0	0	0	0	11	6	2	0
38	GK	(England) Scott Flinders	0	0	0	0	0	0	0	0	0	0	0	0
—	FW	(England) Danny Mitchley	0	0	0	0	0	0	0	0	0	0	0	0
Discipline totals													46	4

- Players used: 29
- Goals scored: 65

== Transfers ==
=== Transfers in ===
Date	Pos.	Nat.	Name	From	Fee	Ref.
5 June 2007	GK	(United States)	Paul Rachubka	Free agency	—	
5 July 2007	CM	(Wales)	Michael Flynn	Free agency	—	
5 July 2007	LB	(England)	John Hills	Free agency	—	
9 July 2007	LB	(Scotland)	Stephen Crainey	Free agency	—	
9 July 2007	RW	(England)	Gary Taylor-Fletcher	Huddersfield Town	Undisclosed	
10 August 2007	LM	(Republic of Ireland)	Wes Hoolahan	Livingston	£75,000	
31 August 2007	LM	(Scotland)	Andy Welsh	Toronto	—	
5 September 2007	CF	(England)	Phil Marsh	Free agency	—	
7 January 2008	CF	(Scotland)	Stephen McPhee	Hull City	£300,000	
31 January 2008	RW	(England)	Stuart Green	Crystal Palace	—	

=== Loans in ===
Date	Pos.	Nat.	Name	From	Until	Ref.
1 October 2007	RB	(England)	Matt Jackson	Watford	5 November 2007	
10 November 2007	RB	(England)	Tony McMahon	Middlesbrough	10 December 2007	
20 November 2007	CF	(Poland)	Bartosz Ślusarski	West Bromwich Albion	1 January 2008	
24 January 2008	GK	(England)	Paul Gerrard	Sheffield United	31 May 2008	
20 March 2008	CF	(England)	Grant Holt	Nottingham Forest	31 May 2008	
27 March 2008	GK	(England)	Scott Flinders	Crystal Palace	31 May 2008	
27 March 2008	LB	(England)	Joe Martin	Tottenham Hotspur	31 May 2008	
31 January 2008	CF	(Scotland)	Paul Dickov	Manchester City	31 May 2008	
31 January 2008	GK	(Latvia)	Pāvels Šteinbors	FK Jūrmala	31 May 2008	

=== Transfers out ===
Date	Pos.	Nat.	Name	To	Fee	Ref.
31 May 2007	CM	(England)	Ciaran Donnelly	Free agency	—	
31 May 2007	CB	(England)	Marc Joseph	Free agency	—	
31 May 2007	CM	(England)	Sean Paterson	Free agency	—	
3 January 2008	CF	(England)	Adrian Forbes	Millwall	—	
22 January 2008	GK	(England)	Rhys Evans	Millwall	—	
31 January 2008	CF	(England)	Scott Vernon	Colchester United	—	

=== Loans out ===
Date	Pos.	Nat.	Name	To	Until	Ref.
17 July 2007	LB	(Republic of Ireland)	Paul Tierney	Stockport County	17 January 2008	
17 July 2007	RM	(Wales)	Simon Wiles	Macclesfield Town	1 January 2008	
9 August 2007	CDM	(England)	Marcus Bean	Rotherham United	31 October 2007	
5 October 2007	GK	(England)	Rhys Evans	Bradford City	30 October 2007	
7 November 2007	CB	(England)	Phil Doughty	Macclesfield Town	17 January 2008	
22 November 2007	RB	(Canada)	Michael D'Agostino	Cheltenham Town	1 January 2008	
1 January 2008	CB	(England)	Phil Doughty	Accrington Stanley	21 February 2008	
7 January 2008	CM	(England)	Matt Lawlor	Farsley Celtic	7 February 2008	
25 January 2008	GK	(England)	Lewis Edge	Northwich Victoria	25 February 2008	
