= Joe Martin (English footballer) =

English footballer (born 1988)

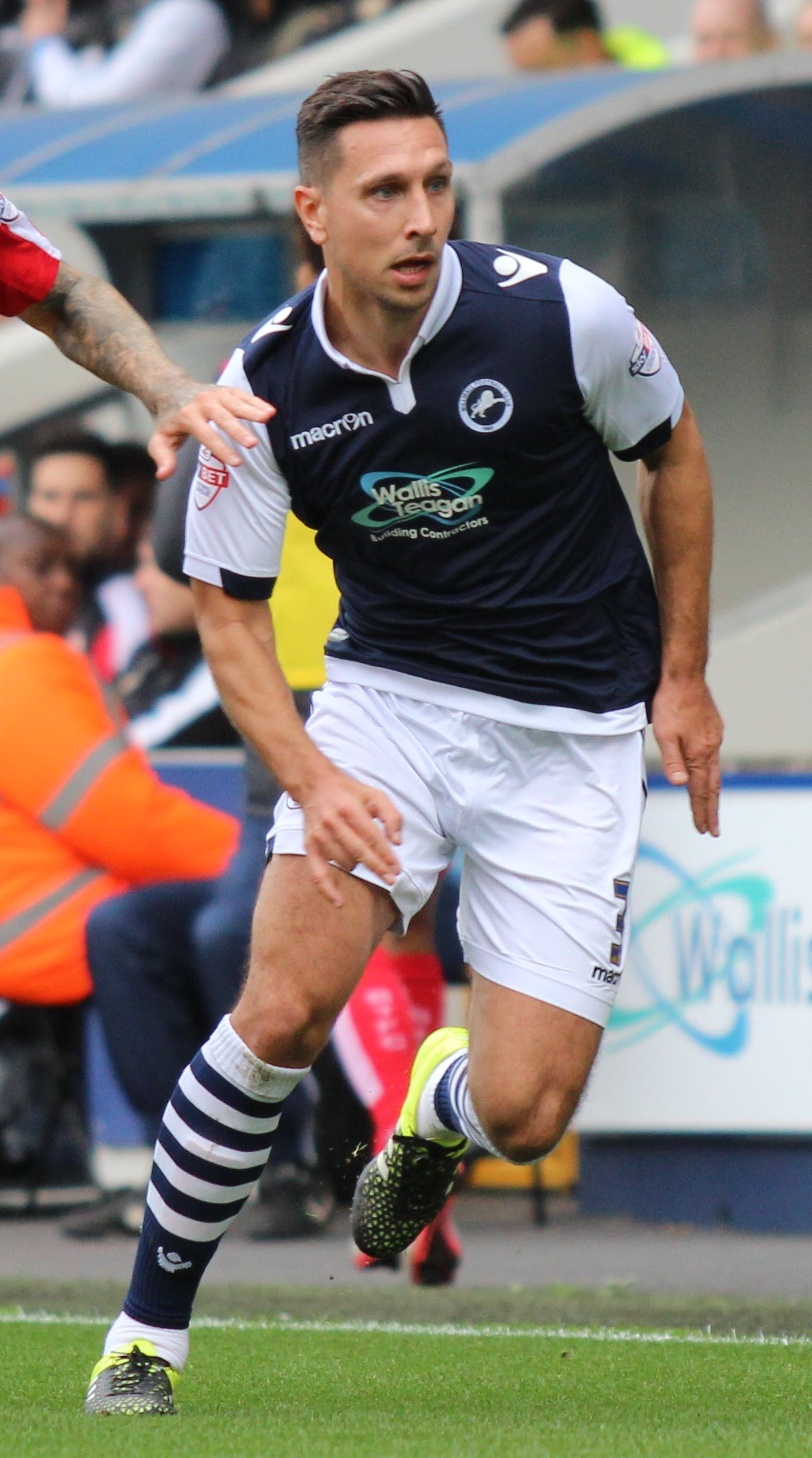

Personal information
- Full name: Joseph John Martin
- Date of birth: 29 November 1988 (age 37)
- Place of birth: Dagenham, England
- Height: 1.83 m (6 ft 0 in)
- Position: Defender

Youth career
- –2005: West Ham United
- 2005–2006: Tottenham Hotspur

Senior career*
Years	Team	Apps	(Gls)
2006–2008	Tottenham Hotspur	0	(0)
2008	→ Blackpool (loan)	1	(0)
2008–2010	Blackpool	23	(0)
2010–2015	Gillingham	161	(8)
2015–2017	Millwall	52	(3)
2017–2019	Stevenage	44	(3)
2018–2019	→ Bristol Rovers (loan)	10	(1)
2019–2021	Northampton Town	23	(0)
2021	Stevenage	14	(0)
2021–2024	Ebbsfleet United	58	(1)

International career
2003–2004	England U16	8	(0)
2004	England U17	2	(0)
- * Club domestic league appearances and goals as of 11:43, 27 April 2024 (UTC)

Joseph John Martin (born 29 November 1988) is an English professional footballer. He most recently played for Ebbsfleet United.

He is a left-sided defender, who can also play as a midfielder. He represented England at under-16 and under-17 levels. He is the son of former West Ham United and England national team player Alvin Martin and the younger brother of professional footballer David Martin.

== Club career ==
=== West Ham United and Tottenham Hotspur Academies ===
Born in Dagenham, east London, Martin was at West Ham United's Academy until 2005 when he moved to Tottenham Hotspur's Academy. He signed his first professional contract with Spurs on 1 July 2007.

==== Loan move to Blackpool ====
On transfer deadline day, 27 March 2008, he signed for Blackpool on loan until the end of the 2007–08 season; however, a calf injury meant he did not make an immediate debut and he was an unused substitute in the Seasiders away match at Plymouth Argyle on 26 April.

Blackpool manager Simon Grayson gave Martin his debut in the final match of the 2007–08 season, at home to Watford on 4 May 2008, a match which the Seasiders had to avoid defeat to avoid relegation to League One. Blackpool drew the match 1–1, with Martin playing on the left wing. Martin returned to Spurs at the end of the season; however, on 13 May 2008, he confirmed that he wanted to return to Blackpool for the 2008–09 season, saying, "That last game against Watford was brilliant and something I'll remember for the rest of my life." And adding "To make your debut in a match like that, when there was a sell-out crowd and so much riding on the outcome, was terrific. The manager seemed pretty pleased with how I did and hopefully I can come back here next year and help the club stay up, if not better. It's up to Tottenham whether I come back. They hold all the cards. But if there is a possibility of it happening then I would love to return to Blackpool. I am really glad that Blackpool stayed up because they are a brilliant club." Later that month Martin was linked, along with his brother, David, with a season-long loan move to Blackpool.

=== Blackpool ===
On 1 July 2008, it was confirmed that Tottenham Hotspur had accepted a bid for Martin from Blackpool and that the player was discussing personal terms. On 2 July, he signed a two-year contract with an option for a further year with Blackpool for an undisclosed fee. "[Spurs] offered me a new deal, but I wasn't really too keen on staying there. The first-team opportunities at White Hart Lane are limited and I want to get some experience and play regularly in the first team, so it was a bit of a no-brainer for me." Blackpool manager Simon Grayson added: "I think Joe looked at the situation and probably realised he wasn't going to be a first-team player there and the next best thing after that is Championship football. We are delighted to have got him and he's delighted to be here."

His first appearance for Blackpool since he signed permanently came on 12 August 2008 when he played in the Seasiders' 2–0 defeat to Macclesfield Town in the League Cup first round at Moss Rose. He then suffered a hip injury and his first league appearance came over one month later when he was a 70th-minute substitute in a 2–0 league defeat to Burnley at Turf Moor on 16 September. However, a leg injury again curtailed his season and his next appearance was not to come for another month when he was a second-half substitute in a 3–2 league win over Derby County at Bloomfield Road.

After playing in two League Cup games, Martin made his first league appearance of the 2009–10 season as a 46th-minute substitute in the 1–2 defeat to Reading at the Madejski Stadium on 21 November 2009. His first start in the league came on 9 January 2010, in a 1–1 draw with Cardiff City at the Cardiff City Stadium.

=== Gillingham ===
On 30 June 2010, Martin was released by Blackpool manager Ian Holloway, he then spent several months on trial at Gillingham of League Two before being signed up. He made his Gillingham debut on 11 December 2010 in a 4–2 away win over Macclesfield Town. He played for the club for over five years, being an integral part of the side that won the 2012–13 Football League Two championship and earning a place in the PFA League Two Team of the Year, but was ultimately released at the end of the 2014–15 season after being deemed surplus to requirements.

=== Millwall ===
On 23 June 2015, Martin joined League One club Millwall on a one-year contract.

=== Stevenage ===
In June 2017, Martin joined Stevenage.

He was released by Stevenage at the end of the 2018–19 season.

=== Northampton Town ===
Martin joined Northampton Town in July 2019. He made his debut on the opening day of the season as Northampton suffered a 1–0 home defeat to Walsall. Martin came off of the bench in the 86th minute of a 3–0 victory at Cheltenham Town in the play-off semi-final second leg as Northampton overturned a 2–0 first leg defeat to secure a place in the final at Wembley Stadium. Although Martin did not feature, Northampton beat Exeter City 4–0 to gain promotion.

=== Stevenage ===
On 29 January 2021, Martin returned to Stevenage. On 15 May 2021 it was announced that he would leave Stevenage at the end of the season, following the expiry of his contract.

=== Ebbsfleet United ===
In June 2021, Martin joined National League South side Ebbsfleet United.

He was released by the club at the end of the 2023–24 season.

== International career ==
Martin played for England at under-16 and under-17 levels.

== Career statistics ==
As of end of 2023–24 season

Appearances and goals by club, season and competition
Club	Season	League			FA Cup		League Cup		Other		Total	
Club	Season	Division	Apps	Goals	Apps	Goals	Apps	Goals	Apps	Goals	Apps	Goals
Blackpool (loan)	2007–08	Championship	1	0	0	0	0	0	–		1	0
Blackpool	2008–09	Championship	15	0	0	0	1	0	–		16	0
Blackpool	2009–10	Championship	6	0	1	0	2	0	–		9	0
Blackpool	Total		21	0	1	0	3	0	–		25	0
Gillingham	2010–11	League Two	17	1	0	0	0	0	0	0	17	1
Gillingham	2011–12	League Two	35	1	3	0	1	0	0	0	39	1
Gillingham	2012–13	League Two	38	2	1	0	1	0	1 (Note: Appearance(s) in Football League Trophy)	0	41	2
Gillingham	2013–14	League One	46	2	2	0	1	0	1	0	50	2
Gillingham	2014–15	League One	25	2	1	0	1	0	5	0	32	2
Gillingham	Total		161	8	7	0	4	0	7	0	179	8
Millwall	2015–16	League One	29	2	2	0	0	0	8 (Note: Five appearances in Football League Trophy, three appearances and one goal in League One play-offs)	1	39	3
Millwall	2016–17	League One	23	1	1	0	1	0	3 (Note: Appearance(s) in EFL Trophy)	0	28	1
Millwall	Total		52	3	3	0	1	0	11	1	67	4
Stevenage	2017–18	League Two	39	2	4	0	1	0	1	0	45	2
Stevenage	2018–19	League Two	5	1	0	0	0	0	0	0	5	1
Stevenage	Total		44	3	4	0	1	0	1	0	50	3
Bristol Rovers (loan)	2018–19	League One	10	1	0	0	0	0	1	0	11	1
Northampton Town	2019–20	League Two	17	0	1	0	0	0	3 (Note: Two appearances in EFL Trophy, one appearance in League Two play-offs)	0	21	0
Northampton Town	2020–21	League One	6	0	1	0	1	0	3	0	11	0
Northampton Town	Total		23	0	2	0	1	0	6	0	32	3
Stevenage	2020–21	League Two	14	0	0	0	0	0	0	0	14	0
Ebbsfleet United	2021–22	National League South	27	1	3	0	—		0	0	30	1
Ebbsfleet United	2022–23	National League South	20	0	2	0	—		1 (Note: Appearance(s) in FA Trophy)	0	23	0
Ebbsfleet United	2023–24	National League	11	0	0	0	—		0	0	11	0
Ebbsfleet United	Total		58	1	5	0	0	0	1	0	64	1
Career total			384	16	22	0	10	0	27	1	443	17

== Honours ==
Gillingham

- Football League Two: 2012–13

Northampton Town

- EFL League Two play-offs: 2020

Ebbsfleet United

- National League South: 2022–23

Individual

- PFA Team of the Year: 2012–13 League Two
