= List of English football transfers summer 2007 =

This is a list of English football transfers for the 2007 summer transfer window. Only moves featuring at least one Premier League or Championship club are listed.

The summer transfer window opened on 1 July 2007, although a few transfers took place prior to that date; the first prominent move went through on 17 April. The window closed on 31 August. Players without a club could join one, either during or in between transfer windows. Clubs below Premier League level could also sign players on loan at any time. If need be, clubs could sign a goalkeeper on an emergency loan, if all others were unavailable.

== Transfers ==
Date	Name	Moving from	Moving to	Fee
17 April 2007	Juan Pablo Ángel	Aston Villa	Major League Soccer (New York Red Bulls)	Free
24 April 2007	André Bikey	Lokomotiv Moscow	Reading	£1m
26 April 2007	Jonathan Woodgate	Real Madrid	Middlesbrough	£7m
4 May 2007	Florent Sinama Pongolle	Liverpool	Recreativo de Huelva	£2.7m
7 May 2007	Chris Howarth	Bolton Wanderers	Carlisle United	Free
11 May 2007	Nuno Morais	Chelsea	APOEL Nicosia	Undisclosed
11 May 2007	Fabrice Muamba	Arsenal	Birmingham City	£4m
14 May 2007	Frank Sinclair	Burnley	Huddersfield Town	Free
14 May 2007	Abel Xavier	Middlesbrough	Major League Soccer (Los Angeles Galaxy)	Free
15 May 2007	Stephen Foster	Scunthorpe United	Darlington	Free
15 May 2007	Ben Gill	Watford	Cheltenham Town	Free
16 May 2007	Kalifa Cissé	Boavista	Reading	£1m
16 May 2007	Péter Halmosi	Debrecen	Plymouth Argyle	£400k
17 May 2007	Zoltán Harsányi	Senec	Bolton Wanderers	Undisclosed
18 May 2007	Jackie McNamara	Wolverhampton Wanderers	Aberdeen	Free
18 May 2007	Krisztián Timár	Ferencváros	Plymouth Argyle	£75k
21 May 2007	Dominic Blizzard	Watford	Milton Keynes Dons	Free
21 May 2007	Chris Iwelumo	Colchester United	Charlton Athletic	Free
21 May 2007	Luke Varney	Crewe Alexandra	Charlton Athletic	£2m
22 May 2007	Arran Lee-Barrett	Coventry City	Hartlepool United	Free
22 May 2007	Douglas Rinaldi	Veranópolis	Watford	£250k
23 May 2007	Sylvain Distin	Manchester City	Portsmouth	Free
23 May 2007	Neil MacKenzie	Scunthorpe United	Notts County	Free
24 May 2007	Matt Jackson	Wigan Athletic	Watford	Free
24 May 2007	Charlie Lee	Tottenham Hotspur	Peterborough United	Free
24 May 2007	Scott Wiseman	Hull City	Darlington	Free
25 May 2007	Gareth Bale	Southampton	Tottenham Hotspur	£5m
25 May 2007	Hermann Hreiðarsson	Charlton Athletic	Portsmouth	Free
25 May 2007	Dale Tonge	Barnsley	Rotherham United	Free
26 May 2007	Mart Poom	Arsenal	Watford	Undisclosed
28 May 2007	Krisztián Németh	MTK Hungária	Liverpool	Undisclosed
28 May 2007	András Simon	MTK Hungária	Liverpool	Undisclosed
30 May 2007	Gábor Király	Crystal Palace	Burnley	Free
30 May 2007	Sulley Muntari	Udinese	Portsmouth	Undisclosed
31 May 2007	Kayode Odejayi	Cheltenham Town	Barnsley	£200k
4 June 2007	Titus Bramble	Newcastle United	Wigan Athletic	Free
4 June 2007	Jacob Mellis	Sheffield United	Chelsea	Undisclosed
4 June 2007	Bruno Ngotty	Birmingham City	Leicester City	Free
4 June 2007	Jimmy Nielsen	Aalborg BK	Leicester City	Undisclosed
4 June 2007	Antoine Sibierski	Newcastle United	Wigan Athletic	Free
5 June 2007	Chris Barker	Cardiff City	Queens Park Rangers	Free
5 June 2007	Feliciano Condesso	Southampton	Villarreal	£34k
5 June 2007	Jobi McAnuff	Crystal Palace	Watford	£1.75m
6 June 2007	Danny Graham	Middlesbrough	Carlisle United	Free
6 June 2007	Paddy McCarthy	Leicester City	Charlton Athletic	£650k
6 June 2007	Scott Parker	Newcastle United	West Ham United	£7m
6 June 2007	Ricky Sappleton	Queens Park Rangers	Leicester City	Free
7 June 2007	Mark Viduka	Middlesbrough	Newcastle United	Free
8 June 2007	Yuri Berchiche	Athletic Bilbao	Tottenham Hotspur	Undisclosed
8 June 2007	Carl Cort	Wolverhampton Wanderers	Leicester City	Free
8 June 2007	Adel Taarabt	RC Lens	Tottenham Hotspur	Undisclosed
11 June 2007	Greg Halford	Reading	Sunderland	£2.5m
11 June 2007	David Hibbert	Preston North End	Shrewsbury Town	Nominal
12 June 2007	Gavin McCann	Aston Villa	Bolton Wanderers	£1m
13 June 2007	Paul Hayes	Barnsley	Scunthorpe United	Tribunal
13 June 2007	Danny O'Donnell	Liverpool	Crewe Alexandra	£100k
14 June 2007	Joey Barton	Manchester City	Newcastle United	£5.8m
14 June 2007	Tal Ben Haim	Bolton Wanderers	Chelsea	Free
14 June 2007	Mark Crossley	Fulham	Oldham Athletic	Free
14 June 2007	Karl Hawley	Carlisle United	Preston North End	Free
15 June 2007	Colin Kazim-Richards	Sheffield United	Fenerbahçe	Undisclosed
15 June 2007	Mario Melchiot	Rennes	Wigan Athletic	Free
18 June 2007	Elliott Benyon	Bristol City	Torquay United	Free
19 June 2007	Andreas Granqvist	Helsingborg	Wigan Athletic	Undisclosed
19 June 2007	Sergio Hellings	AGOVV Apeldoorn	Leicester City	Free
19 June 2007	Izzy Iriekpen	Swansea City	Scunthorpe United	Free
19 June 2007	Radostin Kishishev	Charlton Athletic	Leicester City	Undisclosed
19 June 2007	Ádám Vass	Stoke City	Brescia	Free
19 June 2007	Dean Windass	Bradford City	Hull City	£150k
20 June 2007	Chris Adamson	Sheffield Wednesday	Stockport County	Free
20 June 2007	Matthew Jarvis	Gillingham	Wolverhampton Wanderers	Undisclosed
20 June 2007	Yassin Moutaouakil	Châteauroux	Charlton Athletic	£400k
20 June 2007	Jon Parkin	Hull City	Stoke City	£250k
20 June 2007	Chris Robertson	Sheffield United	Torquay United	Free
21 June 2007	Hasney Aljofree	Plymouth Argyle	Swindon Town	Undisclosed
22 June 2007	Steven MacLean	Sheffield Wednesday	Cardiff City	Free
22 June 2007	Gavin Rae	Rangers	Cardiff City	Free
25 June 2007	Nicky Forster	Hull City	Brighton	£75k
25 June 2007	Thierry Henry	Arsenal	Barcelona	£16.1m
25 June 2007	José Semedo	Sporting	Charlton Athletic	Free
26 June 2007	Błażej Augustyn	Bolton Wanderers	Legia Warsaw	Free
26 June 2007	Scott Barron	Ipswich Town	Millwall	Free
26 June 2007	Martin Cranie	Southampton	Portsmouth	Tribunal
27 June 2007	Russell Anderson	Aberdeen	Sunderland	£1m
27 June 2007	Tony Craig	Millwall	Crystal Palace	Undisclosed
27 June 2007	Aaron Hughes	Aston Villa	Fulham	£1m
27 June 2007	Nikolay Mihaylov	Levski Sofia	Liverpool	Undisclosed
27 June 2007	Daniel Nardiello	Barnsley	Queens Park Rangers	Undisclosed
27 June 2007	Carlo Nash	Preston North End	Wigan Athletic	£300k
27 June 2007	Ivan Sproule	Hibernian	Bristol City	Undisclosed
28 June 2007	Matthew Blinkhorn	Blackpool	Morecambe	Tribunal
28 June 2007	Jonas Elmer	Chelsea	FC Aarau	Undisclosed
28 June 2007	Ian Henderson	Norwich City	Northampton Town	Free
28 June 2007	Mark Howard	Cardiff City	St Mirren	Free
28 June 2007	Garry O'Connor	Lokomotiv Moscow	Birmingham City	£2.7m
28 June 2007	Marek Saganowski	Troyes	Southampton	Undisclosed
29 June 2007	Godwin Antwi	Liverpool	Hartlepool United	Loan
29 June 2007	Jamie Cureton	Colchester United	Norwich City	Undisclosed
29 June 2007	Robert Earnshaw	Norwich City	Derby County	£3.5m
29 June 2007	Bryan Hughes	Charlton Athletic	Hull City	Free
29 June 2007	Olivier Kapo	Juventus	Birmingham City	£3m
29 June 2007	Antony Kay	Barnsley	Tranmere Rovers	Free
29 June 2007	David Rozehnal	Paris Saint-Germain	Newcastle United	£2.9m
30 June 2007	Ellery Cairo	Hertha Berlin	Coventry City	Free
30 June 2007	John Curtis	Nottingham Forest	Queens Park Rangers	Free
30 June 2007	Arjan de Zeeuw	Wigan Athletic	Coventry City	Free
1 July 2007	Jérémie Aliadière	Arsenal	Middlesbrough	£2m
1 July 2007	Neil Austin	Barnsley	Darlington	Free
1 July 2007	Darren Bent	Charlton Athletic	Tottenham Hotspur	£16.5m
1 July 2007	Marciano Bruma	Sparta Rotterdam	Barnsley	Free
1 July 2007	Tony Capaldi	Plymouth Argyle	Cardiff City	Free
1 July 2007	Gérald Cid	Bordeaux	Bolton Wanderers	Free
1 July 2007	Matty Collins	Fulham	Swansea City	Free
1 July 2007	Blerim Džemaili	FC Zürich	Bolton Wanderers	Free
1 July 2007	Łukasz Fabiański	Legia Warsaw	Arsenal	Undisclosed
1 July 2007	Julien Faubert	Bordeaux	West Ham United	£6.1m
1 July 2007	Willo Flood	Cardiff City	Dundee United	Loan
1 July 2007	Matthew Gilks	Rochdale	Norwich City	Free
1 July 2007	Owen Hargreaves	Bayern Munich	Manchester United	Undisclosed
1 July 2007	Stephen Henderson	Aston Villa	Bristol City	Free
1 July 2007	Andy Johnson	Leicester City	Barnsley	Free
1 July 2007	Billy Jones	Crewe Alexandra	Preston North End	£500k (Tribunal)
1 July 2007	Dimitrios Konstantopoulos	Hartlepool United	Coventry City	Free
1 July 2007	James Krause	Ipswich Town	Rushden & Diamonds	Free
1 July 2007	Arran Lee-Barrett	Coventry City	Hartlepool United	Free
1 July 2007	Keith Lowe	Wolverhampton Wanderers	Port Vale	Loan
1 July 2007	Arturo Lupoli	Arsenal	Fiorentina	Free
1 July 2007	Yves Ma-Kalambay	Chelsea	Hibernian	Free
1 July 2007	Miguel Mostto	Cienciano	Barnsley	Undisclosed
1 July 2007	Alan O'Brien	Newcastle United	Hibernian	Undisclosed
1 July 2007	Bobby Olejnik	Aston Villa	Falkirk	Free
1 July 2007	Jon Otsemobor	Crewe Alexandra	Norwich City	Free
1 July 2007	Stuart Parnaby	Middlesbrough	Birmingham City	Free
1 July 2007	Danny Philliskirk	Oldham Athletic	Chelsea	Undisclosed
1 July 2007	Claudio Pizarro	Bayern Munich	Chelsea	Free
1 July 2007	Paul Rachubka	Huddersfield Town	Blackpool	Free
1 July 2007	Jlloyd Samuel	Aston Villa	Bolton Wanderers	Free
1 July 2007	Tim Sandercombe	Plymouth Argyle	Notts County	Free
1 July 2007	Steve Sidwell	Reading	Chelsea	Free
1 July 2007	Andriy Voronin	Bayer Leverkusen	Liverpool	Free
1 July 2007	Andy Whing	Coventry City	Brighton & Hove Albion	Free
1 July 2007	Craig Woodman	Bristol City	Wycombe Wanderers	Free
2 July 2007	Anderson	F.C. Porto	Manchester United	Undisclosed (£30m combined with Nani)
2 July 2007	Tommy Black	Crystal Palace	Southend United	Free
2 July 2007	Robert Burch	Tottenham Hotspur	Sheffield Wednesday	Free
2 July 2007	Darren Currie	Ipswich Town	Luton Town	Free
2 July 2007	Eduardo da Silva	Dinamo Zagreb	Arsenal	Undisclosed
2 July 2007	Richard Garcia	Colchester United	Hull City	Free
2 July 2007	Lee Grant	Derby County	Sheffield Wednesday	Free
2 July 2007	Richard Hinds	Scunthorpe United	Sheffield Wednesday	Free
2 July 2007	Tomasz Kuszczak	West Bromwich Albion	Manchester United	Undisclosed
2 July 2007	Shelton Martis	Hibernian	West Bromwich Albion	£50k
2 July 2007	Nani	Sporting	Manchester United	Undisclosed (£30m combined with Anderson)
2 July 2007	Gunnar Nielsen	BK Frem	Blackburn Rovers	Undisclosed
2 July 2007	Maceo Rigters	NAC Breda	Blackburn Rovers	Undisclosed
2 July 2007	Peter Thorne	Norwich City	Bradford City	Free
3 July 2007	Craig Beattie	Celtic	West Bromwich Albion	£1.25m
3 July 2007	Julien Brellier	Hearts	Norwich City	Free
3 July 2007	Danny Coyne	Burnley	Tranmere Rovers	Free
3 July 2007	Geremi	Chelsea	Newcastle United	Free
3 July 2007	Danny Guthrie	Liverpool	Bolton Wanderers	Loan
3 July 2007	Richard Kingston	Hammarby	Birmingham City	Free
3 July 2007	Rob Kozluk	Sheffield United	Barnsley	Free
3 July 2007	Luis García	Liverpool	Atlético Madrid	£4m
3 July 2007	Håvard Nordtveit	FK Haugesund	Arsenal	Undisclosed
3 July 2007	Clive Platt	Milton Keynes Dons	Colchester United	£300k
3 July 2007	Chris Powell	Watford	Charlton Athletic	Free
3 July 2007	Daniël de Ridder	Celta Vigo	Birmingham City	Free
3 July 2007	Lee Ridley	Scunthorpe United	Cheltenham Town	Free
3 July 2007	Darren Ward	Crystal Palace	Wolverhampton Wanderers	Undisclosed
3 July 2007	Dominik Werling	Sakaryaspor	Barnsley	Free
3 July 2007	Mark Yeates	Tottenham Hotspur	Colchester United	Undisclosed
3 July 2007	Reto Ziegler	Tottenham Hotspur	Sampdoria	Undisclosed
4 July 2007	Jonathan Forte	Sheffield United	Scunthorpe United	Free
4 July 2007	Jonny Hayes	Reading	Leicester City	Free
4 July 2007	Jeff Hughes	Lincoln City	Crystal Palace	Undisclosed
4 July 2007	Phil Jagielka	Sheffield United	Everton	£4m
4 July 2007	David Marshall	Celtic	Norwich City	Undisclosed
4 July 2007	Tyrone Mears	West Ham United	Derby County	£1m
4 July 2007	Martin Paterson	Stoke City	Scunthorpe United	Tribunal
4 July 2007	Billy Sharp	Scunthorpe United	Sheffield United	Undisclosed
4 July 2007	Teddy Sheringham	West Ham United	Colchester United	Free
4 July 2007	Svetoslav Todorov	Portsmouth	Charlton Athletic	Free
4 July 2007	Fernando Torres	Atlético Madrid	Liverpool	Undisclosed
4 July 2007	Tuncay	Fenerbahçe	Middlesbrough	Free
4 July 2007	Nicky Weaver	Manchester City	Charlton Athletic	Free
4 July 2007	Myles Weston	Charlton Athletic	Notts County	Free
4 July 2007	Richard Wright	Everton	West Ham United	Free
5 July 2007	Paris Cowan-Hall	Rushden & Diamonds	Portsmouth	Undisclosed
5 July 2007	Steven Davis	Aston Villa	Fulham	Undisclosed
5 July 2007	Michael Flynn	Gillingham	Blackpool	Free
5 July 2007	Luke Guttridge	Leyton Orient	Colchester United	Free
5 July 2007	John Hills	Sheffield Wednesday	Blackpool	Free
5 July 2007	Joe Jacobson	Cardiff City	Bristol Rovers	Free
5 July 2007	Younes Kaboul	Auxerre	Tottenham Hotspur	Undisclosed
5 July 2007	Hossein Ka'abi	Persepolis	Leicester City	Undisclosed
5 July 2007	Arnold Mvuemba	Rennes	Portsmouth	Undisclosed
5 July 2007	Gary Naysmith	Everton	Sheffield United	£1m
5 July 2007	Kevin Nicholls	Leeds United	Preston North End	Undisclosed
5 July 2007	Curtis Osano	Reading	Rushden & Diamonds	Work experience
5 July 2007	Nigel Reo-Coker	West Ham United	Aston Villa	£8.5m
5 July 2007	Callum Reynolds	Rushden & Diamonds	Portsmouth	Undisclosed
5 July 2007	Ryan Smith	Derby County	Millwall	£150k
6 July 2007	Leon Best	Southampton	Coventry City	Tribunal
6 July 2007	Gary Borrowdale	Crystal Palace	Coventry City	Tribunal
6 July 2007	Freddy Eastwood	Southend United	Wolverhampton Wanderers	£1.5m
6 July 2007	Michael Hughes	Crystal Palace	Coventry City	Free
6 July 2007	Shaun Newton	West Ham United	Leicester City	Free
6 July 2007	Rafael Schmitz	Lille	Birmingham City	Loan
6 July 2007	Boudewijn Zenden	Liverpool	Marseille	Free
7 July 2007	Roy Carroll	West Ham United	Rangers	Free
7 July 2007	Djibril Cissé	Liverpool	Marseille	£6m
7 July 2007	Jerahl Hughes	Crystal Palace	Yeovil Town	Free
7 July 2007	Michael Oakes	Wolverhampton Wanderers	Cardiff City	Free
9 July 2007	Matthew Connolly	Arsenal	Colchester United	Loan
9 July 2007	Ryan Crowther	Stockport County	Liverpool	Undisclosed
9 July 2007	Danny Granville	Crystal Palace	Colchester United	Free
9 July 2007	Diomansy Kamara	West Bromwich Albion	Fulham	£6m
9 July 2007	Kelly Youga	Charlton Athletic	Scunthorpe United	Loan
10 July 2007	Mikel Alonso	Real Sociedad	Bolton Wanderers	Loan
10 July 2007	Craig Bellamy	Liverpool	West Ham United	£7.5m
10 July 2007	Marc Bircham	Queens Park Rangers	Yeovil Town	Free
10 July 2007	Stephen Crainey	Leeds United	Blackpool	Free
10 July 2007	Julian Gray	Birmingham City	Coventry City	Free
10 July 2007	Ben Hinchliffe	Preston North End	Derby County	Free
10 July 2007	Jason Koumas	West Bromwich Albion	Wigan Athletic	£5.3m
10 July 2007	Florent Malouda	Lyon	Chelsea	£13.5m
10 July 2007	Michael Ricketts	Preston North End	Oldham Athletic	Free
10 July 2007	Trevor Sinclair	Manchester City	Cardiff City	Free
10 July 2007	Gary Taylor-Fletcher	Huddersfield Town	Blackpool	Undisclosed
10 July 2007	Andy Todd	Blackburn Rovers	Derby County	£750k
10 July 2007	Steve Watson	West Bromwich Albion	Sheffield Wednesday	Free
11 July 2007	Graham Branch	Burnley	Accrington Stanley	Free
11 July 2007	Harry Forrester	Watford	Aston Villa	Undisclosed
11 July 2007	Emil Hallfreðsson	Tottenham Hotspur	Lyn-Oslo	Undisclosed
11 July 2007	Lee McCulloch	Wigan Athletic	Rangers	£2.25m
11 July 2007	David Nugent	Preston North End	Portsmouth	Undisclosed
11 July 2007	David Střihavka	Baník Ostrava	Norwich City	Undisclosed
11 July 2007	John Utaka	Rennes	Portsmouth	Undisclosed
12 July 2007	Chris Baird	Southampton	Fulham	£3.025m
12 July 2007	Yossi Benayoun	West Ham United	Liverpool	Undisclosed
12 July 2007	Khalid Boulahrouz	Chelsea	Sevilla	Loan
12 July 2007	Adam Hammill	Liverpool	Southampton	Loan
12 July 2007	Michael McIndoe	Wolverhampton Wanderers	Bristol City	Undisclosed
12 July 2007	Simon Royce	Queens Park Rangers	Gillingham	Free
12 July 2007	Bacary Sagna	Auxerre	Arsenal	Undisclosed
13 July 2007	Ryan Babel	Ajax	Liverpool	£11.5m
13 July 2007	Rolando Bianchi	Reggina	Manchester City	£8.8m
13 July 2007	Michael Chopra	Cardiff City	Sunderland	£5m
13 July 2007	Stephen Clemence	Birmingham City	Leicester City	£1m
13 July 2007	Graham Coughlan	Sheffield Wednesday	Rotherham United	Free
13 July 2007	Pablo Couñago	Málaga	Ipswich Town	Free
13 July 2007	David Healy	Leeds United	Fulham	£1.5m
13 July 2007	Paul Konchesky	West Ham United	Fulham	£3.25m
14 July 2007	Wayne Brown	Colchester United	Hull City	£450k
14 July 2007	Gelson Fernandes	FC Sion	Manchester City	Undisclosed
15 July 2007	Aaron Ledgister	Bristol City	Cheltenham Town	Free
16 July 2007	Neil Alexander	Cardiff City	Ipswich Town	Free
16 July 2007	Paul Heckingbottom	Barnsley	Bradford City	Loan
16 July 2007	Stephen Jordan	Manchester City	Burnley	Free
16 July 2007	Paul Peschisolido	Derby County	Luton Town	Free
16 July 2007	Kieran Richardson	Manchester United	Sunderland	Undisclosed
16 July 2007	Rohan Ricketts	Wolverhampton Wanderers	Barnsley	Free
16 July 2007	Kelvin Wilson	Preston North End	Nottingham Forest	£300k
17 July 2007	Dickson Etuhu	Norwich City	Sunderland	£1.5m
17 July 2007	Geovanni	Cruzeiro	Manchester City	Free
17 July 2007	Marlon Harewood	West Ham United	Aston Villa	Undisclosed
17 July 2007	Arnau Riera	Sunderland	Falkirk	Loan
17 July 2007	Filipe Teixeira	Académica de Coimbra	West Bromwich Albion	£600k
18 July 2007	Grant Basey	Charlton Athletic	Brentford	Loan
18 July 2007	Paul Tierney	Blackpool	Stockport County	Loan
18 July 2007	Simon Wiles	Blackpool	Macclesfield Town	Loan
19 July 2007	Lee Cook	Queens Park Rangers	Fulham	Undisclosed
19 July 2007	Stephen Elliott	Sunderland	Wolverhampton Wanderers	Undisclosed
19 July 2007	Lee Hendrie	Aston Villa	Sheffield United	Free
19 July 2007	Tommy Miller	Sunderland	Ipswich Town	Free
19 July 2007	Jimmy Smith	Chelsea	Norwich City	Loan
20 July 2007	DJ Campbell	Birmingham City	Leicester City	£2.1m
20 July 2007	Jerzy Dudek	Liverpool	Real Madrid	Free
20 July 2007	Michael Mancienne	Chelsea	Queens Park Rangers	Loan
20 July 2007	Dennis Rommedahl	Charlton Athletic	Ajax	£680k
23 July 2007	Heiðar Helguson	Fulham	Bolton Wanderers	Undisclosed
23 July 2007	Freddie Ljungberg	Arsenal	West Ham United	£3m
24 July 2007	Scott Davies	Reading	Aldershot Town	Loan
24 July 2007	Robbie Fowler	Liverpool	Cardiff City	Free
24 July 2007	Scott Phelan	Everton	Bradford City	Free
24 July 2007	Steven Pienaar	Borussia Dortmund	Everton	Loan
25 July 2007	Claude Davis	Sheffield United	Derby County	£3m
25 July 2007	Michael Gray	Blackburn Rovers	Wolverhampton Wanderers	Free
25 July 2007	Thomas Harban	Barnsley	Bradford City	Loan
25 July 2007	Sammy Moore	Ipswich Town	Brentford	Loan
25 July 2007	Danny Rose	Leeds United	Tottenham Hotspur	Undisclosed
26 July 2007	Leon Barnett	Luton Town	West Bromwich Albion	£2.5m
26 July 2007	Don Hutchison	Coventry City	Luton Town	Free
26 July 2007	Lucas	Grêmio	Liverpool	Undisclosed
26 July 2007	Paul McShane	West Bromwich Albion	Sunderland	£2.5m
26 July 2007	Martin Petrov	Atlético Madrid	Manchester City	£4.7m
26 July 2007	Ben Sahar	Chelsea	Queens Park Rangers	Loan
26 July 2007	Ross Turnbull	Middlesbrough	Cardiff City	Loan
26 July 2007	Luke Young	Charlton Athletic	Middlesbrough	£2.5m
27 July 2007	Paul Boertien	Derby County	Walsall	Free
27 July 2007	Lee Camp	Derby County	Queens Park Rangers	£300k
27 July 2007	Nathan Joynes	Barnsley	Bradford City	Loan
27 July 2007	Lewin Nyatanga	Derby County	Barnsley	Loan
27 July 2007	Lewis Price	Ipswich Town	Derby County	Undisclosed
27 July 2007	Tininho	Beira-Mar	West Bromwich Albion	£230k
27 July 2007	Grégory Vignal	Lens	Southampton	Loan
27 July 2007	Simon Walton	Charlton Athletic	Queens Park Rangers	£200k
27 July 2007	Christian Wilhelmsson	Nantes	Bolton Wanderers	Loan
28 July 2007	Lee Peltier	Liverpool	Yeovil Town	Loan
30 July 2007	Jurgen Colin	Norwich City	Ajax	£67.5k
30 July 2007	Kerrea Gilbert	Arsenal	Southend United	Loan
30 July 2007	Neil Kilkenny	Birmingham City	Oldham Athletic	Loan
30 July 2007	Ian Miller	Ipswich Town	Darlington	Loan
30 July 2007	José Antonio Reyes	Arsenal	Atlético Madrid	Undisclosed
30 July 2007	Darel Russell	Stoke City	Norwich City	Undisclosed
31 July 2007	Alan Bennett	Reading	Southampton	Loan
31 July 2007	Kevin-Prince Boateng	Hertha Berlin	Tottenham Hotspur	Undisclosed
31 July 2007	Michael Brown	Fulham	Wigan Athletic	Undisclosed
31 July 2007	Steven Cann	Derby County	Rotherham United	Free
31 July 2007	José Fonte	Benfica	Crystal Palace	Loan
31 July 2007	Giuseppe Rossi	Manchester United	Villarreal	Undisclosed
1 August 2007	Colin Cameron	Coventry City	Milton Keynes Dons	Free
1 August 2007	Andy Griffin	Portsmouth	Derby County	Free
1 August 2007	Eric Lichaj	Unattached	Aston Villa	Free
1 August 2007	Roque Santa Cruz	Bayern Munich	Blackburn Rovers	Undisclosed
1 August 2007	Dennis Souza	Unattached	Barnsley	Free
2 August 2007	Béla Balogh	MTK Hungária	Colchester United	Loan
2 August 2007	Boštjan Cesar	Marseille	West Bromwich Albion	Loan
2 August 2007	Vedran Ćorluka	Dinamo Zagreb	Manchester City	Undisclosed
2 August 2007	Richard Cresswell	Leeds United	Stoke City	Undisclosed
2 August 2007	Elano	Shakhtar Donetsk	Manchester City	£8m
2 August 2007	Emerse Faé	Nantes	Reading	£2.5m
2 August 2007	Javier Garrido	Real Sociedad	Manchester City	£1.5m
2 August 2007	Youssef Safri	Norwich City	Southampton	Undisclosed
2 August 2007	Tamás Vaskó	Újpest	Bristol City	Loan
3 August 2007	Lionel Ainsworth	Derby County	Hereford United	Free
3 August 2007	Valeri Bojinov	Fiorentina	Manchester City	Undisclosed
3 August 2007	Daniel Braaten	Rosenborg	Bolton Wanderers	Undisclosed
3 August 2007	Caçapa	Lyon	Newcastle United	Free
3 August 2007	Stephen Connor	Everton	Partick Thistle	Loan
3 August 2007	Kevin Lisbie	Charlton Athletic	Colchester United	Free
3 August 2007	Franck Queudrue	Fulham	Birmingham City	£2m
3 August 2007	Liam Ridgewell	Aston Villa	Birmingham City	£2m
3 August 2007	Alan Smith	Manchester United	Newcastle United	£6m
3 August 2007	Carlos Tevez	West Ham United	West Ham United	£2m
3 August 2007	Stephen Wright	Sunderland	Stoke City	Loan
4 August 2007	Frankie Artus	Bristol City	Exeter City	Loan
4 August 2007	James Beattie	Everton	Sheffield United	£4m
4 August 2007	David Carney	Sydney FC	Sheffield United	Undisclosed
4 August 2007	Adrian Leijer	Melbourne Victory	Fulham	Undisclosed
4 August 2007	Collins Mbesuma	Portsmouth	Bursaspor	Undisclosed
4 August 2007	Garry Richards	Colchester United	Southend United	Undisclosed
6 August 2007	Steve Adams	Sheffield Wednesday	Swindon Town	Free
6 August 2007	Ryan Garry	Arsenal	AFC Bournemouth	Free
6 August 2007	José Enrique Sánchez	Villarreal	Newcastle United	£6.3m
7 August 2007	Leighton Baines	Wigan Athletic	Everton	Undisclosed
7 August 2007	David Graham	Sheffield Wednesday	Gillingham	Free
7 August 2007	Carl Hoefkens	Stoke City	West Bromwich Albion	£750k
7 August 2007	James Morrison	Middlesbrough	West Bromwich Albion	£1.5m
8 August 2007	Hamer Bouazza	Watford	Fulham	Undisclosed
8 August 2007	Souleymane Diawara	Charlton Athletic	Bordeaux	Undisclosed
8 August 2007	Craig Gordon	Hearts	Sunderland	£9m
8 August 2007	Richard Jackson	Derby County	Luton Town	Free
8 August 2007	Joe Lewis	Norwich City	Morecambe	Loan
8 August 2007	James Russell	Chelsea	Stevenage Borough	Free
9 August 2007	Marcus Bean	Blackpool	Rotherham United	Loan
9 August 2007	Darren Carter	West Bromwich Albion	Preston North End	£1.25m
9 August 2007	Benny Feilhaber	Hamburg	Derby County	£1m
9 August 2007	Max Gradel	Leicester City	AFC Bournemouth	Loan
9 August 2007	Charles Itandje	RC Lens	Liverpool	Undisclosed
9 August 2007	Francis Jeffers	Blackburn Rovers	Sheffield Wednesday	Undisclosed
9 August 2007	Izale McLeod	Milton Keynes Dons	Charlton Athletic	£1.1m
9 August 2007	Heinz Müller	Lillestrøm	Barnsley	Free
9 August 2007	Roy O'Donovan	Cork City	Sunderland	Undisclosed
9 August 2007	Jason Pearce	Portsmouth	AFC Bournemouth	Free
9 August 2007	Pedro Pelé	Southampton	West Bromwich Albion	£1m
9 August 2007	Ryan Shawcross	Manchester United	Stoke City	Loan
9 August 2007	Graham Stack	Reading	Wolverhampton Wanderers	Loan
9 August 2007	Mark Staunton	Charlton Athletic	Falkirk	Free
9 August 2007	Zheng Zhi	Shandong Luneng	Charlton Athletic	£2m
10 August 2007	Alex	PSV Eindhoven	Chelsea	Free
10 August 2007	Asmir Begović	Portsmouth	AFC Bournemouth	Loan
10 August 2007	Martin Brittain	Ipswich Town	Carlisle United	Free
10 August 2007	Scott Carson	Liverpool	Aston Villa	Loan
10 August 2007	Jean-François Christophe	Portsmouth	AFC Bournemouth	Loan
10 August 2007	Toumani Diagouraga	Watford	Hereford United	Loan
10 August 2007	Johan Djourou	Arsenal	Birmingham City	Loan
10 August 2007	Hogan Ephraim	West Ham United	Queens Park Rangers	Loan
10 August 2007	Joe Garner	Blackburn Rovers	Carlisle United	£140k
10 August 2007	Stuart Giddings	Coventry City	Oldham Athletic	Loan
10 August 2007	Ben Hamer	Reading	Brentford	Loan
10 August 2007	Richard Martin	Unattached	Manchester City	Free
10 August 2007	Garreth O'Connor	Burnley	AFC Bournemouth	Loan
10 August 2007	Carl Pentney	Leicester City	York City	Loan
10 August 2007	Adrian Pettigrew	Chelsea	Brentford	Loan
10 August 2007	Theo Robinson	Watford	Hereford United	Loan
10 August 2007	Carlos Tevez	MSI	Manchester United	Loan
12 August 2007	Lomana LuaLua	Portsmouth	Olympiacos	Undisclosed
13 August 2007	Andy O'Brien	Portsmouth	Bolton Wanderers	Undisclosed
13 August 2007	Henrik Pedersen	Unattached	Hull City	Free
13 August 2007	Jimmy Ryan	Liverpool	Shrewsbury Town	Loan
13 August 2007	Phil Starkey	Crystal Palace	Ebbsfleet United	Free
13 August 2007	David Unsworth	Unattached	Burnley	Free
14 August 2007	Sambégou Bangoura	Stoke City	Boavista	£270k
14 August 2007	Andy Carroll	Newcastle United	Preston North End	Loan
14 August 2007	Kevin Foley	Luton Town	Wolverhampton Wanderers	Undisclosed
15 August 2007	Chris Brunt	Sheffield Wednesday	West Bromwich Albion	£3m
15 August 2007	Kim Christensen	OB	Barnsley	Undisclosed
15 August 2007	Ritchie Jones	Manchester United	Yeovil Town	Loan
15 August 2007	Ishmael Miller	Manchester City	West Bromwich Albion	Loan
16 August 2007	Clarke Carlisle	Watford	Burnley	£200k
16 August 2007	Clive Clarke	Sunderland	Leicester City	Loan
16 August 2007	Chris Dickson	Charlton Athletic	Crewe Alexandra	Loan
16 August 2007	Kieron Dyer	Newcastle United	West Ham United	£6m
16 August 2007	Márton Fülöp	Sunderland	Leicester City	Loan
16 August 2007	Jimmy Floyd Hasselbaink	Unattached	Cardiff City	Free
16 August 2007	Mido	Tottenham Hotspur	Middlesbrough	£6m
16 August 2007	Stuart Nicholson	West Bromwich Albion	Shrewsbury Town	Loan
16 August 2007	Wayne Thomas	Burnley	Southampton	£1m
16 August 2007	Nicky Travis	Sheffield United	Chesterfield	Loan
18 August 2007	Jody Craddock	Wolverhampton Wanderers	Stoke City	Loan
18 August 2007	Ritchie De Laet	Royal Antwerp	Stoke City	£100k
20 August 2007	Jimmy Abdou	Unattached	Plymouth Argyle	Free
20 August 2007	Jamie Clapham	Wolverhampton Wanderers	Leeds United	Loan
20 August 2007	Paul Gallacher	Norwich City	Dunfermline	Loan
20 August 2007	Eddie Lewis	Leeds United	Derby County	Undisclosed
21 August 2007	Ryan Bertrand	Chelsea	Oldham Athletic	Loan
21 August 2007	Chris McGrail	Preston North End	Accrington Stanley	Loan
21 August 2007	Matthew Mills	Manchester City	Doncaster Rovers	Loan
21 August 2007	Stefan Wessels	Köln	Everton	Free
23 August 2007	Anderson Silva	Everton	Barnsley	Loan
23 August 2007	Juliano Belletti	FC Barcelona	Chelsea	Undisclosed
23 August 2007	Peter Gulacsi	MTK Hungária	Liverpool	Loan
23 August 2007	Gabriel Heinze	Manchester United	Real Madrid	Undisclosed
23 August 2007	Kasey Keller	Borussia Mönchengladbach	Fulham	Free
23 August 2007	Nikolay Mihaylov	Liverpool	FC Twente	Loan
23 August 2007	Arjen Robben	Chelsea	Real Madrid	Undisclosed
23 August 2007	Miki Roque	Liverpool	Xerez	Loan
23 August 2007	Mikel San José	Athletic Bilbao	Liverpool	Free
24 August 2007	Andrew Cole	Unattached	Sunderland	Free
24 August 2007	David Forde	Cardiff City	Luton Town	Loan
24 August 2007	Ian Murray	Rangers	Norwich City	Free
24 August 2007	Joe O'Cearuill	Arsenal	Barnet	Loan
24 August 2007	Jamie O'Hara	Tottenham Hotspur	Millwall	Loan
24 August 2007	Bartosz Ślusarski	Dyskobolia Grodzisk Wielkopolski	West Bromwich Albion	£680k
24 August 2007	Sean Thomas	Queens Park Rangers	Wealdstone	Loan
24 August 2007	Robbie Williams	Barnsley	Huddersfield Town	Undisclosed
25 August 2007	Stephen Foster	Burnley	Barnsley	£100k
26 August 2007	Gabriel Paletta	Liverpool	Boca Juniors	Undisclosed
28 August 2007	Sam Oji	Birmingham City	Leyton Orient	Loan
29 August 2007	Darren Byfield	Millwall	Bristol City	Undisclosed
29 August 2007	Nathan Ellington	West Bromwich Albion	Watford	£3.25m
29 August 2007	Etiënne Esajas	Vitesse Arnhem	Sheffield Wednesday	Undisclosed
29 August 2007	Ian Harte	Levante	Sunderland	Free
29 August 2007	Danny Higginbotham	Stoke City	Sunderland	£2.5m
29 August 2007	Stern John	Sunderland	Southampton	Free
29 August 2007	Kenwyne Jones	Southampton	Sunderland	£6m
29 August 2007	Zat Knight	Fulham	Aston Villa	£3.5m
29 August 2007	Akpo Sodje	Port Vale	Sheffield Wednesday	Undisclosed
29 August 2007	Yakubu	Middlesbrough	Everton	£11.25m
30 August 2007	Nathan Ashton	Unattached	Fulham	Free
30 August 2007	Lee Barnard	Tottenham Hotspur	Crewe Alexandra	Loan
30 August 2007	Rachid Bouaouzan	Sparta Rotterdam	Wigan Athletic	Undisclosed
30 August 2007	Thomas Gravesen	Celtic	Everton	Loan
30 August 2007	Besian Idrizaj	Liverpool	Crystal Palace	Loan
30 August 2007	Dave Mulligan	Scunthorpe United	Grimsby Town	Loan
30 August 2007	Josh Wright	Charlton Athletic	Barnet	Loan
31 August 2007	Graham Alexander	Preston North End	Burnley	£200k
31 August 2007	Santiago Aloi	River Plate	Watford	Loan
31 August 2007	Sone Aluko	Birmingham City	Aberdeen	Loan
31 August 2007	Roman Bednář	Heart of Midlothian	West Bromwich Albion	Loan
31 August 2007	Marcus Bent	Charlton Athletic	Wigan Athletic	Loan
31 August 2007	Habib Beye	Olympique Marseille	Newcastle United	Undisclosed
31 August 2007	Chris Birchall	Coventry City	St Mirren	Loan
31 August 2007	Henri Camara	Wigan Athletic	West Ham United	Loan
31 August 2007	Jamal Campbell-Ryce	Southend United	Barnsley	Undisclosed
31 August 2007	Leon Clarke	Sheffield Wednesday	Southend United	Loan
31 August 2007	Bernardo Corradi	Manchester City	Parma	Loan
31 August 2007	Michael Coulson	Barnsley	Northwich Victoria	Loan
31 August 2007	Simon Cox	Reading	Swindon Town	Loan
31 August 2007	Curtis Davies	West Bromwich Albion	Aston Villa	Loan
31 August 2007	Abdoulaye Faye	Bolton Wanderers	Newcastle United	Undisclosed
31 August 2007	Lassana Diarra	Chelsea	Arsenal	Undisclosed
31 August 2007	Paul Dickov	Manchester City	Crystal Palace	Loan
31 August 2007	Papa Bouba Diop	Fulham	Portsmouth	Undisclosed
31 August 2007	Jason Euell	Middlesbrough	Southampton	Free
31 August 2007	Amdy Faye	Charlton Athletic	Rangers	Loan
31 August 2007	Warren Feeney	Cardiff City	Swansea City	Loan
31 August 2007	Marco Ferreira	Benfica	Leicester City	Loan
31 August 2007	Jarosław Fojut	Bolton Wanderers	Luton Town	Loan
31 August 2007	Caleb Folan	Wigan Athletic	Hull City	£1m
31 August 2007	Paul Gallagher	Blackburn Rovers	Preston North End	Loan
31 August 2007	Andy Gooding	Coventry City	Burton Albion	Loan
31 August 2007	Lewis Grabban	Crystal Palace	Motherwell	Loan
31 August 2007	Stephen Henderson	Bristol City	York City	Loan
31 August 2007	Evan Horwood	Sheffield United	Gretna	Loan
31 August 2007	Stephen Hughes	Leicester City	Motherwell	Undisclosed
31 August 2007	Paul Huntington	Newcastle United	Leeds United	Undisclosed
31 August 2007	Glen Johnson	Chelsea	Portsmouth	Undisclosed
31 August 2007	Jemal Johnson	Wolverhampton Wanderers	Milton Keynes Dons	Undisclosed
31 August 2007	Richard Keogh	Bristol City	Huddersfield Town	Loan
31 August 2007	David Knight	Middlesbrough	Swansea City	Free
31 August 2007	Shefki Kuqi	Crystal Palace	Fulham	Loan
31 August 2007	Mikele Leigertwood	Sheffield United	Queens Park Rangers	£900k
31 August 2007	Anthony Le Tallec	Liverpool	Le Mans	Loan
31 August 2007	Larrys Mabiala	Paris Saint-Germain	Plymouth Argyle	Loan
31 August 2007	David McGoldrick	Southampton	Port Vale	Loan
31 August 2007	Kenny Miller	Celtic	Derby County	£3m
31 August 2007	Danny Mills	Manchester City	Charlton Athletic	Loan
31 August 2007	Danny Murphy	Tottenham Hotspur	Fulham	Loan
31 August 2007	Christian Nadé	Sheffield United	Heart of Midlothian	Undisclosed
31 August 2007	George O'Callaghan	Ipswich Town	Brighton & Hove Albion	Loan
31 August 2007	Gary O'Neil	Portsmouth	Middlesbrough	Undisclosed
31 August 2007	Eric Odhiambo	Leicester City	Southend United	Loan
31 August 2007	Borja Oubiña	Celta Vigo	Birmingham City	Loan
31 August 2007	Wilson Palacios	Olimpia	Birmingham City	Loan
31 August 2007	Demar Phillips	Waterhouse	Stoke City	Undisclosed
31 August 2007	Damien Plessis	Lyon	Liverpool	Undisclosed
31 August 2007	Reuben Reid	Plymouth Argyle	Wycombe Wanderers	Loan
31 August 2007	Adam Rooney	Stoke City	Chesterfield	Loan
31 August 2007	Liam Rosenior	Fulham	Reading	Undisclosed
31 August 2007	Alex Russell	Bristol City	Northampton Town	Loan
31 August 2007	Moustapha Salifou	FC Wil	Aston Villa	Undisclosed
31 August 2007	Seol Ki-Hyeon	Reading	Fulham	Undisclosed
31 August 2007	Mohamed Shawky	Al Ahly	Middlesbrough	£650k
31 August 2007	Jay Simpson	Arsenal	Millwall	Loan
31 August 2007	Sam Sodje	Reading	Charlton Athletic	Loan
31 August 2007	Nolberto Solano	Newcastle United	West Ham United	Free
31 August 2007	Dejan Stefanović	Portsmouth	Fulham	£1m
31 August 2007	Andy Welsh	Toronto	Blackpool	Free
31 August 2007	Harry Worley	Chelsea	Carlisle United	Loan

== See also ==
- List of English football transfers Winter 2007-08

== Notes and references ==
- "Transfers - April 2007". BBC Sport. 26 April 2007.
- "Transfers - May 2007". BBC Sport. 31 May 2007.
- "Transfers - June 2007". BBC Sport. 1 July 2007.
- "Transfers - July 2007". BBC Sport. 31 July 2007.
- "Transfers - August 2007". BBC Sport. 1 September 2007.
