= Phil Marsh =

English footballer (born 1986)

- Marsh playing for Stalybridge Celtic in 2012

Personal information
- Full name: Philip Marsh
- Date of birth: 15 November 1986 (age 39)
- Place of birth: St Helens, England
- Position: Striker

Team information
- Current team: Pilkington

Youth career
- 2003–2006: Manchester United

Senior career*
Years	Team	Apps	(Gls)
2006–2007	Manchester United	0	(0)
2007–2008	Blackpool	0	(0)
2008	Northwich Victoria	2	(0)
2008	Hyde United	5	(0)
2008–2009	Leigh Genesis	17	(5)
2009–2010	FC United of Manchester	43	(11)
2010–2012	Stalybridge Celtic	75	(40)
2012–2013	Forest Green Rovers	5	(0)
2012	→ Hereford United (loan)	7	(1)
2013–2014	Guiseley	21	(1)
2013–2014	→ Stalybridge Celtic (loan)	11	(4)
2014	→ Barrow (loan)	4	(1)
2014	Salford City	3	(0)
2014	Ashton United	9	(1)
2014–2015	Cefn Druids	13	(3)
2016	Bala Town	0	(0)
2016	Altrincham	4	(0)
2017	Runcorn Town		
2017	Pilkington		
2017–2018	Rhyl		
2018–2019	Droylsden		
2019	Clitheroe		
2019–	Pilkington		
- * Club domestic league appearances and goals as of 09:21, 13 July 2017 (UTC)

Philip Marsh (born 15 November 1986) is an English footballer who plays for Pilkington as a striker.

He started his career at Manchester United where he played one game in the League Cup against Crewe Alexandra, before moving down the ladder to join Blackpool. He later moved into non-league football, joining Northwich Victoria in 2008. Later that year he had a short spell with Conference North side Hyde United before leaving after only making five appearances, joining Leigh Genesis where he stayed until March 2009 before being released and subsequently joining FC United of Manchester where he spent a season before moving back to Tameside to join Stalybridge Celtic at the start of the 2010–11 season, finishing his first year at Stalybridge as the club's top goalscorer. In the summer of 2012, Marsh signed for Forest Green Rovers.

== Career ==
=== Early career ===
Born in St Helens, Merseyside, Marsh started his football career at Manchester United. In October 2006, Marsh made his Manchester United debut when he played in Manchester United's 2–1 away win against Crewe Alexandra in the League Cup. He started up front with Alan Smith in the match and was given the squad number 41. He was substituted for Michael Barnes at half-time. Marsh was released from the club in June 2007. In July, he joined Scottish Premier League club Inverness Caledonian Thistle on trial.

On 5 September 2007, Marsh signed for English Championship side Blackpool after a successful six-week trial. On 7 May 2008, he was released by Blackpool without making a first-team appearance. On 7 July, Marsh had a trial at Bury, scoring in each of the teams pre-season friendlies at Stockport County, Radcliffe Borough and at home to Huddersfield. Marsh was signed on non-contract terms by Conference National side Northwich Victoria in September 2008, making his first appearance in the 90th minute against Torquay United on 7 September 2008. He left Northwich in September 2008, and was signed by Hyde United.

Marsh scores for Stalybridge in a game against Droylsden

On 22 December 2008, he made his first appearance for Leigh Genesis, scoring one goal in their 3–2 away loss in the Lancashire FA Challenge Trophy second round against Radcliffe Borough. He also made 17 league appearances, scoring five goals, and one appearance in the Northern Challenge Cup, scoring one goal, before joining FC United of Manchester on 19 March 2009, also of the Northern Premier League Premier Division. On 9 July 2010, it was announced that Marsh had left the club.

=== Stalybridge Celtic ===
After his release from FC United of Manchester he joined Conference North side Stalybridge Celtic. He made his debut for the club on 14 August 2010, scoring in a 2–0 win over Redditch United. On 6 November 2010, he scored 4 goals in one match as part of a 5–0 away win over Workington. On 16 November 2010 he netted another two goals in a 4–0 derby win over Droylsden, Marsh capitalising on Droylsden's poor performance. On 21 February 2011, he scored for Stalybridge in their local derby against his former club Hyde. Marsh finished the 2010–11 season as Stalybridge's top goalscorer with 24 goals in all competitions. Marsh started his second season with Stalybridge well, scoring his first hat-trick of the season against Vauxhall Motors in August, meaning Marsh would finish the first month of the season with ten goals already to his name.

=== Forest Green Rovers and Hereford United ===
On 10 May 2012, Marsh joined Forest Green Rovers on a free transfer, signing a two-year contract with the Conference National club. He made his debut on 14 August 2012 in an away win against AFC Telford United.

After finding his first-team opportunities limited at Forest Green Rovers, he joined Hereford United on a one-month loan deal on 5 October 2012.

On 31 January 2013, Marsh and Forest Green came to a mutual agreement to terminate his contract early and he left the club.

=== Guiseley, Stalybridge Celtic and Barrow ===
Marsh rejoined Guiseley in the summer of 2013. In January 2014, he joined Barrow on loan.

=== Salford City, Ashton United and Wales ===
He signed with Northern Premier League Division One North club Salford City in August 2014. He made his club debut in the opening league match of the season on 16 August as Salford beat Scarborough 4–1.

The following month he joined Ashton United, afterwards signing for Cefn Druids in December 2014. He joined Bala Town of the Welsh Premier League in August 2016.

In September 2016 he joined Altrincham. He was released in December, and in January 2017 he joined North West Counties Football League side Runcorn Town. He joined Rhyl of the Welsh Cymru Alliance in October 2017, from Pilkington of the Cheshire Football League.

Marsh was released by Rhyl, via text message, in May 2018.

On 29 September 2018, he scored the winning goal in his Droylsden debut, as they qualified for the FA Trophy on behalf of Widnes. He finished the season at Clitheroe since March 2019, helping them retain their Northern Premier League status.

Marsh returned to Pilkington for the 2019–20 campaign of the North West Counties League Division One North.
