= Phil Doughty =

English footballer

Personal information
- Full name: Philip Michael Doughty
- Date of birth: 6 September 1986 (age 40)
- Place of birth: Kirkham, England
- Height: 6 ft 2 in (1.88 m)
- Position: Defender

Youth career
- –2002: Blackpool

Senior career*
Years	Team	Apps	(Gls)
2002–2008	Blackpool	0	(0)
2005	→ Leigh RMI (loan)	0	(0)
2007	→ Barrow (loan)	5	(0)
2007–2008	→ Macclesfield Town (loan)	6	(0)
2008	→ Accrington Stanley (loan)	3	(0)
2008–2010	Fleetwood Town		
2009	→ Welshpool Town (loan)	18	(0)
2009–2010	→ AFC Fylde (loan)		
2010–2013	AFC Fylde		
2012	→ Bamber Bridge (loan)		
2013–2015	Bamber Bridge		
2015	Nelson	7	(0)
- * Club domestic league appearances and goals as of 20:16, 15 July 2015 (UTC)

Philip Michael Doughty (born 6 September 1986 in Kirkham, Lancashire) is an English professional footballer.

A defender, Doughty started his career at Blackpool in 2002 before moving up the Fylde coast to join Fleetwood Town in 2008.

== Career ==
=== Blackpool ===
Born in Kirkham, Doughty signed as a trainee with Blackpool on 1 December 2002. Only six days later he became the youngest player to represent Blackpool in the FA Cup, when aged 16 years and 93 days he came on as a last-minute substitute against Torquay United in a second-round match whilst he was still at school locally in Kirkham and still too young to train with the Blackpool team, and he had to receive special permission to play from his headmaster at Carr Hill School.

On 3 May 2003, Doughty again needed his headmaster's permission to feature for Blackpool, this time as an unused substitute for Blackpool's final league game of the 2002-03 season against Chesterfield, when then Blackpool manager Steve McMahon named five youth team players in the matchday squad. In the summer of 2003 Doughty joined the club's youth team.

Doughty signed a two-year professional contract on 17 November 2004, with an option for a further two years at Blackpool after impressing as captain of the club's reserve team and also as an unused substitute as part of the first-team squad. Since then Doughty has played for the club in competitions such as the Football League Trophy, but not in the league.

On 14 January 2005, Doughty signed on loan with Leigh RMI, who were then in the Conference National where he was due to stay until 25 April. However, on 11 February, then Blackpool manager, Colin Hendry cancelled the loan deal after Doughty had played in just one game out of a possible four. In October, Doughty broke two bones in his leg in a youth-team match and was told he would be out of action for between nine and twelve months.

After finally recovering from a fractured tibia and fibula, Doughty became a regular in the Blackpool reserve team, and on 29 March 2007, he was loaned out to Conference North club Barrow until the end of the 2006-07 season. In July 2007, Blackpool extended his contract by one year with an option for further twelve months.

Although a regular in the Blackpool reserve team, and despite being seen earlier in his career as one of the club's brightest prospects, Doughty had not played a first-team game for Blackpool for three years when, on 7 November 2007, he joined Football League Two club Macclesfield Town on a one-month loan deal in order to get some first-team football, and to try and earn a new contract with Blackpool, where his contract is due to finish at the end of the 2007-08 season. Doughty was offered a permanent deal to sign for Macclesfield when his loan spell with the club ended on 17 January 2008, with manager Ian Brightwell keen to sign Doughty. However, he turned down the move and instead the following day went out on a one-month loan again, this time to fellow League Two club Accrington Stanley after talks with manager John Coleman, with a view to a possible permanent move. However, after his loan spell, he returned to Blackpool on 21 February as defensive cover for the club due to injuries. On 7 May 2008, he was released by Blackpool.

=== Fleetwood Town ===
Doughty had trials at Hereford United and Huddersfield Town before signing for Fleetwood Town, newly promoted to the Conference North, with club manager, Tony Greenwood saying, "Phil is an ambitious young lad who has been looking for a Football League club and we have given him the shop window to achieve that". After struggling to maintain a first team place, Doughty joined Welsh Premier League side Welshpool Town on loan for the remainder of the 2008–09 season. He returned to Fleetwood at the end of the season.

=== AFC Fylde ===
Doughty signed a season-long loan deal with AFC Fylde on 17 June 2009. before joining them permanently.

=== Nelson ===
In June 2015, Doughty signed for North West Counties Football League Premier Division side Nelson from Bamber Bridge.

== Career statistics ==
As of match played 16 February 2008.

Club statistics
Club	Season	League			FA Cup		League Cup		Other		Total	
Club	Season	Division	Apps	Goals	Apps	Goals	Apps	Goals	Apps	Goals	Apps	Goals
Blackpool	2002–03	Second Division	0	0	1	0	0	0	0	0	1	0
Blackpool	2004–05	League One	0	0	0	0	0	0	3 (Note: Appearances in Football League Trophy)	0	3	0
Blackpool	Total		0	0	1	0	0	0	3	0	4	0
Leigh RMI (loan)	2004–05	Conference National	0	0	—		—		1 (Note: Appearances in FA Trophy)	0	1	0
Barrow (loan)	2006–07	Conference North	5	0	—		—		—		5	0
Macclesfield Town (loan)	2007–08	League Two	6	0	—		—		—		6	0
Accrington Stanley (loan)	2007–08	League Two	3	0	—		—		—		3	0
Career total			14	0	1	0	0	0	4	0	19	0
