= Michael D'Agostino =

Canadian soccer coach and former player

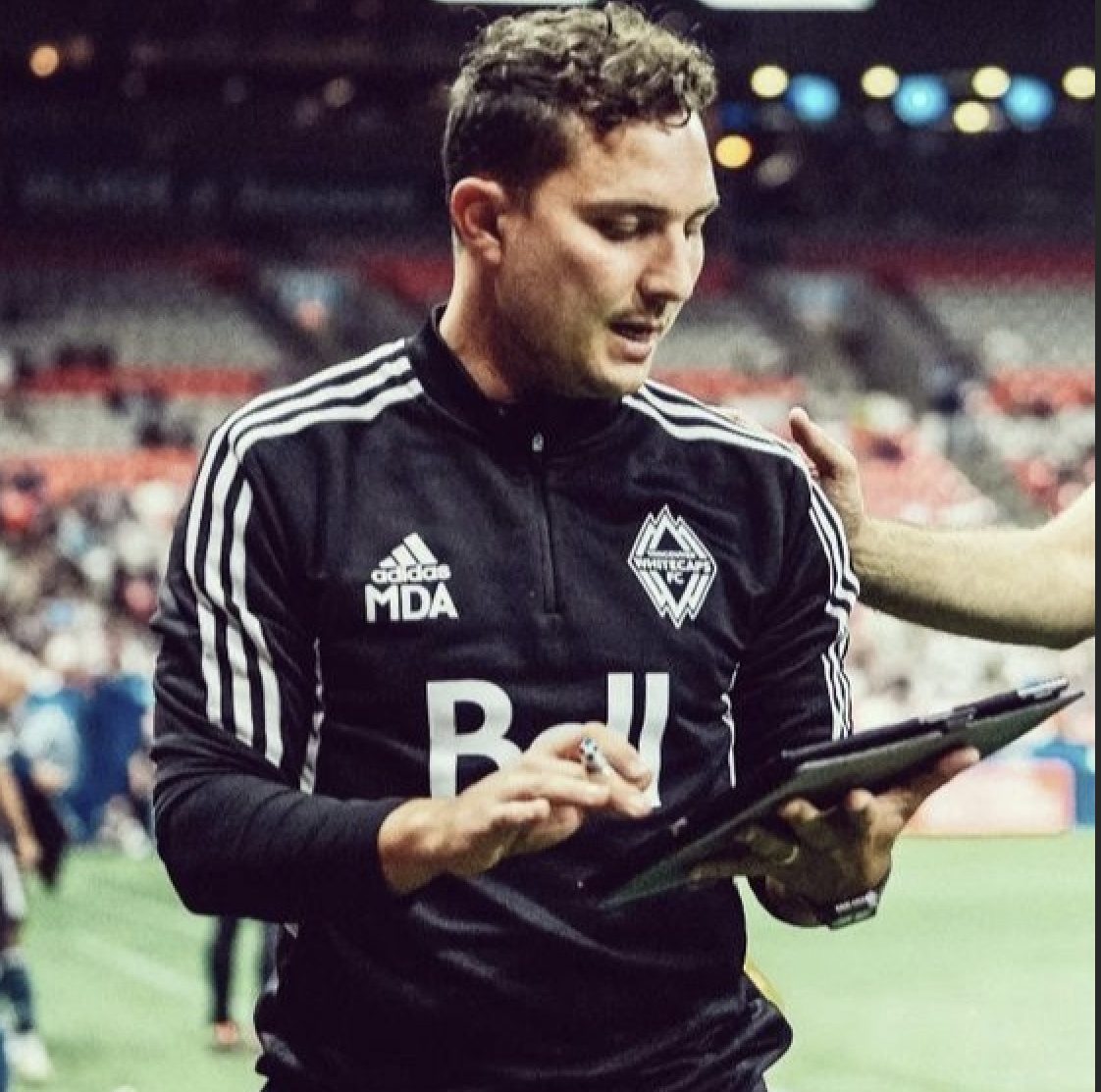

Personal information
- Full name: Michael D'Agostino
- Date of birth: 7 January 1987 (age 39)
- Place of birth: Vancouver, British Columbia, Canada
- Height: 1.75 m (5 ft 9 in)
- Position: Midfielder

College career
Years	Team	Apps	(Gls)
2005	Kentucky Wildcats		

Senior career*
Years	Team	Apps	(Gls)
2006	Whitecaps FC Reserves	?	(?)
2007–2008	Blackpool	7	(0)
2007–2008	→ Cheltenham Town (loan)	25	(0)
2009	Hereford United	11	(0)
2011	Sportfreunde Siegen	17	(0)

International career^{‡}
2005–2007	Canada U20	19	(0)
- * Club domestic league appearances and goals as of 19 March 2012 ‡ National team caps and goals as of 15 August 2011

Michael D'Agostino (born 7 January 1987) is a Canadian former soccer player who is currently the assistant coach for the Vancouver Whitecaps of Major League Soccer.

== Background ==
D'Agostino was born in Vancouver, British Columbia, and attended Langley Secondary School. After highschool, he was offered a full scholarship to the University of Kentucky. In 2005, he was the Wildcats' leading scorer with three goals and eleven assists.

== Club career ==
=== Early career ===
In 2006 D'Agostino played in the Pacific Coast Soccer League for Whitecaps FC Reserves with whom he won the championship.

=== Blackpool ===
After having trials in Italy with Reggina and Messina, he had trials in England with Leeds United and then Blackpool where he played in a Reserves match. D'Agostino signed a one-year contract in September 2007 with Blackpool with an option for an additional year. On 4 October 2007, Blackpool received international clearance for him to play for the club.

=== Loan move to Cheltenham Town ===
After playing a few games for the Blackpool reserves team, Blackpool sent D'Agostino on loan to Football League One club Cheltenham Town on 22 November until 1 January 2008. Blackpool manager, Simon Grayson said of the move, "This is a great opportunity for the lad to go and play some first team matches and we will be monitoring his progress closely."

D'Agostino went straight into the Cheltenham squad for their home match against Leeds United on 25 November. He was an unused substitute in the match, which Cheltenham won 1–0. Following three substitute appearances, D'Agostino made his full debut for the club on 29 December in a 1–0 away defeat to Tranmere Rovers. On 31 December his loan deal was extended by a further four weeks. On 2 January 2008 he made his home debut for the club in a 1–0 win against Port Vale. D'Agostino combined with Steven Gillespie to set up Paul Connor to score Cheltenham's goal. He received praise from the club's manager, Keith Downing, who said he had a "terrific home debut", D'Agostino won the "Man of the Match" award. The club's fans nicknamed him "Daggers" and his loan spell was due to end following the 1–0 home defeat to Millwall on 29 January. However, Cheltenham had already confirmed that they would try and extend the loan period further, and Blackpool manager Simon Grayson confirmed that the club were willing to extend the loan period by a further four weeks. His loan deal was extended by a further four weeks. Then on 31 January Blackpool agreed to extend the loan period until the end of the season, when he would return to Bloomfield Road and Blackpool expected to activate the one-year contract extension. Keith Downing said of the deal, "Hopefully they (Blackpool) are pleased with the progress Michael has made with us as we are helping him develop as a player as well." Simon Grayson added "Michael has done well. We will keep a regular check on his progress and next season I would imagine he will be in and around our squad."

=== Return to Blackpool ===
After returning to Blackpool, on 7 May 2008 Blackpool activated an option to extend his contract with the club by one year.

On 16 December 2008 he was released by Blackpool.

=== Hereford United ===
On 20 February 2009, after a short trial, D'Agostino joined League One club Hereford United on an initial one-month contract. D'Agostino never played a competitive match for Hereford, featuring as an unused substitute five times.

=== ICSF INTER ===
It was reported that Michael returned to Canada from England and signed with ICSF Inter of the VMSL for the 2010 season.

== International career ==
In 2003, D'Agostino played for the Canadian under-15 team in a tour of Germany. He was a member of the Canada U-20s that competed in the FIFA U-20 World Cup in 2007 which took place in Canada. Canada lost all three of its matches in the group stage, to Austria, Congo and Chile. D'Agostino played in just the one match against Austria. He has fourteen caps for the Canadian Under 20 team.

== Honours ==
- Whitecaps FC Reserves
  - Pacific Coast Soccer League champion (1): 2006
