= 2006–07 Blackpool F.C. season =

English football club season

Blackpool F.C.
2006–07 season
- Owner: Owen Oyston
- Chairman: Karl Oyston
- Manager: Simon Grayson
- Stadium: Bloomfield Road
- League One: 3rd
- Play-offs: Winners (promoted)
- FA Cup: Fourth round
- League Cup: First round
- League Trophy: Second round
- Top goalscorer: League: Andy Morrell (16); All: Andy Morrell (20)
- Highest home attendance: 9,491 vs Norwich City, FA Cup, 27 January 2007
- Lowest home attendance: 3,938 vs Barnsley, League Cup, 22 August 2006
- Average home league attendance: 6,877

The 2006–07 season was Blackpool F.C.'s 99th season (96th consecutive) in the Football League. It was also their fifth consecutive season in the third tier of English football. They finished third, and were promoted via the play-offs to The Championship.

Andy Morrell was the club's top scorer, with twenty goals (sixteen in the league, three in the FA Cup and one in the League Trophy).

It was Simon Grayson's first full season as manager.

== Season review ==
=== 2006 ===
Blackpool's league season began on 5 August 2006, with a long trip to Brentford. Olafur Ingi Skulason's 74th-minute strike — what turned out to be his only goal of the season — gave all three points to the hosts.

Three days later, Blackpool faced Nottingham Forest in an evening game at Bloomfield Road. A double from Forest's Jack Lester, one in either half, sealed a win for the visitors.

Another home game followed on 12 August, against Rotherham United. A single goal, scored by Will Hoskins in the 78th minute, gave the U's the points, and left Blackpool without a point from a possible nine.

Blackpool's second away game, at Bristol City on 19 August, provided them with their first win. Goals from Scott Vernon (27'), Michael Jackson (50'), Keigan Parker (77') and Danny Graham (89') gave the Tangerines a 4–2 victory.

League Cup duties began on 22 August, and Barnsley travelled to the Fylde Coast for what turned out to be a long affair. The score was tied 1–1 at the end of normal time, Scott Vernon's 70th-minute goal cancelling out Robbie Williams' earlier penalty. The match went to extra time, during which each side scored one more goal — Vernon, in the final minute, again equalising proceedings. To penalties it went, and Barnsley came out on top 4–2.

Focus returned to the league, and on 26 August Gillingham were the visitors to Bloomfield Road. The Gills took the lead after just three minutes, through Guylain Ndumbu-Nsungu. Scott Vernon again came to the Seasiders' rescue with a goal, scored ten minutes before the break, and 1–1 was how the scoreline remained.

Into September, and Blackpool travelled to the New Den to face Millwall on the second of the month and returned with another point in a goalless draw.

Another away game a week later saw the Tangerines return empty-handed from Port Vale. Keith Southern's last-minute goal halving Vale's lead established by Leon Constantine and Akpo Sodje.

Blackpool welcomed Chesterfield to town on 12 September. Simon Gillett, who arrived at the club the previous month on a three-month loan from Southampton, opened the scoring after 33 minutes; however, Kevan Hurst equalised on the hour-mark, and the game finished 1–1.

Oldham were the next visitors to Bloomfield Road, on 16 September, and held Blackpool to their fourth stalemate in five games. Scott Vernon opened the scoring four minutes before half time. The score was brought level twenty minutes after the interval by former Blackpool midfielder Richie Wellens. Oldham then took the lead on 72 minutes through Chris Porter, but substitute Andy Morrell saved the home side's blushes with an equaliser in injury time.

For their tenth league game, on 23 September, Blackpool returned to the road and travelled to South Yorkshire to face Doncaster Rovers. They kept a clean sheet in a goalless draw.

Played	Won	Drawn	Lost	For	Against
10	1	5	4	9	12

The Seasiders travelled north to Carlisle United the following midweek. Goals from former Blackpool loanee Chris Lumsdon and Karl Hawley gave the Cumbrians victory.

On 30 September, Blackpool faced Leyton Orient at Bloomfield Road. Andy Morrell opened the scoring after 21 minutes, and that's how matters remained for the next hour. On 81 minutes, Orient were reduced to ten men when Adam Tann was sent off. Wes Hoolahan converted the resulting penalty, and Keigan Parker found the net four minutes later for Blackpool's third and final goal.

Blackpool travelled to the south coast on 8 October to face Brighton & Hove Albion, and recorded their second successive win, again by a 3–0 margin. Keith Southern scored his second goal of the season after seventeen minutes, and a double by Scott Vernon (61' and 87'), either side of Alexandre Frutos's dismissal for the home side, sealed the three points for the visitors.

Six days later, Blackpool hosted Yeovil Town. Scott Vernon's 56th-minute opener was equalised by Marcus Stewart four minutes from time.

Crewe Alexandra were the opponents the following weekend, and Blackpool returned to Lancashire the victors after a 2–1 victory over Dario Gradi's men. Andy Morrell's third-minute strike was cancelled out by Nicky Maynard after 67 minutes. Shaun Barker scored the winner in injury time for Blackpool, who had Simon Gillett dismissed ten minutes earlier.

On 28 October, Bradford City were the visitors to Bloomfield Road. David Fox scored the game's first goal after 38 minutes. Wes Hoolahan doubled the lead on the stroke of half-time from the penalty spot. Twenty minutes into the second half, Keigan Parker made it three without reply, and added another six minutes later. The Bantams scored what proved to be a consolation goal six minutes from time, before having Joe Brown sent off in injury time.

Cup action intervened on 31 October, this time the League Trophy, and Blackpool travelled to Accrington Stanley. Simon Gillett opened the scoring just after the half-hour mark, only to see Ian Craney bring Stanley level a minute before the break. Shaun Barker restored the Seasiders' lead on 54 minutes, but this was again cancelled out by Andy Todd five minutes later. The hosts took the lead for the first time, through Paul Mullin, after 64 minutes, but Ben Burgess restored parity with his first goal of the season fifteen minutes from time. Burgess doubled his tally ten minutes later, and Robbie Williams tied the game at 4–4 in injury time. The game went to a penalty shootout, which Stanley won 4–2.

Back in the league, Blackpool travelled to Northampton Town on 4 November. Andy Morrell put the Tangerines ahead after twenty minutes. Blackpool maintained their lead until just after the hour mark, when Eoin Jess pulled the scores level. The match ended 1–1, Blackpool's seventh draw of the league season.

Blackpool's FA Cup campaign began in Huddersfield on 11 November. Wes Hoolahan's 70th-minute penalty was enough to see the Seasiders through to the second round.

Blackpool and Huddersfield met again, this time in the league, seven days later at Bloomfield Road. Keigan Parker (20') and Keith Southern (30') put the hosts 2–0 up, before future 'Pool player Gary Taylor-Fletcher pulled one back for Town on the stroke of half-time. Andy Morrell put the game out of reach for Blackpool on the hour mark. Goalkeeper Paul Rachubka, who was on Huddersfield's bench for both games, joined Blackpool on loan in January.

On 24 November, Simon Grayson's men made the short trip down the coast to face Tranmere Rovers. Former Blackpool loan player Chris Greenacre put Rovers ahead inside two minutes. Steve Davies extended the lead on 67 minutes, and Blackpool's seven-game unbeaten league run was ended.

The FA Cup intervened again on 2 December, and Blackpool travelled to face MK Dons for their second-round tie. Keigan Parker put Blackpool ahead after half an hour, and Andy Morrell doubled their lead just after the break. Blackpool progressed to the third round.

Cheltenham Town were the visitors to Bloomfield Road for a league game on 5 December. Damian Spencer gave Town the lead after thirteen minutes, but Andy Morrell (29') and Wes Hoolahan (80') combined to give the Tangerines all three points.

Played	Won	Drawn	Lost	For	Against
20	7	7	6	28	22

Four days later, Swansea City travelled to the seaside. Carl Dickinson's 21st-minute own goal gave the Swans the lead. Scott Vernon levelled proceedings with just seven minutes left on the referee's watch.

Blackpool travelled to Scunthorpe United on 15 December, and recorded their second victory in three games. Andy Morrell put Blackpool in the lead just before the half-hour mark; Wes Hoolahan doubled the scoreline from the penalty spot on 58 minutes (fifteen minutes before he was sent off); and Keigan Parker made it three on 88 minutes. Ian Baraclough pulled one back for the Iron in injury time.

The following week saw Blackpool visiting the south coast again, this time to face AFC Bournemouth. After a scoreless first half, Keigan Parker put Blackpool ahead two minutes after the restart. He scored his and the Seasiders' second five minutes later. Bournemouth were reduced to ten men on 69 minutes when Darren Anderton was dismissed. Simon Gillett, who had been on loan to Blackpool the previous month, pulled one back for the home side, but David Fox restored Blackpool's two-goal lead two minutes from time.

Blackpool began the second half of the league season with a Boxing Day home game against Carlisle. An own goal by the visitors' Peter Murphy after five minutes gave the Seasiders the lead. Keigan Parker added a second on 29 minutes. Karl Hawley scored a consolation goal for Carlisle seventeen minutes from time.

2006 was closed out with a home game against Doncaster Rovers on 30 December. Scott Vernon (77') put the hosts ahead ten minutes after coming on as a substitute, and his goal was followed in quick succession by Shaun Barker ('81) and one more from himself ('83). Paul Heffernan pulled one back for Rovers in injury time.

Simon Grayson was named League One Manager of the Month for December.

=== 2007 ===
The calendar was turned with a trip to Chesterfield on New Year's Day. A 2–0 defeat ensued, Blackpool's first loss in seven games.

Focus turned to the FA Cup again on 6 January, with Aldershot visiting Bloomfield Road for the first time in fifteen years. Scott Vernon found the net after just four minutes. This was followed three minutes later by an Andy Morrell strike. John Grant netted for Aldershot just before the half-hour mark, and the score remained 2–1 at half-time. Morrell scored his second and Blackpool's third on 73 minutes, and Ben Burgess made it four with ten minutes remaining. Mark Pritchard scored a second for the visitors, but the game ended 4–2, and Blackpool had made it to the fourth round for the first time in seventeen years.

Back in League One, Port Vale were the Seasiders' opposition at Bloomfield Road on 13 January. All three goals in the game came in the final eighteen minutes. Andy Morrell put the Tangerines in front after 72 minutes, and David Fox followed his lead four minutes later. Akpo Sodje halved Vale's deficit from the penalty spot in injury time, but the visitors couldn't muster an equaliser and Blackpool bagged the points.

Blackpool travelled to London seven days later to face Leyton Orient. Keith Southern's 85th-minute goal gave the Seasiders the victory.

On 27 January, Norwich City were Blackpool's opponents in the fourth round of the FA Cup. A full house at Bloomfield Road looked on as Darren Huckerby put the Canaries ahead in the dying seconds of the first half. Ian Evatt levelled the score seven minutes after the interval. Norwich had Chris Brown sent off eight minutes from time, but they held on for a replay at Carrow Road.

For their sixth home date in eight games, Blackpool faced Brentford on 3 February. The Bees went three goals ahead in the first half hour, and Blackpool did not reply until Scott Vernon's injury-time strike.

For their FA Cup fourth-round replay ten days later, 'Pool travelled to Norwich. Michael Jackson put the visitors ahead with just under ten minutes of the first half remaining. That goal separated the teams for the next forty minutes, until Darren Huckerby evened things up. The score remained 1–1 at full-time, and the match went into extra time. Five minutes into extra time, Huckerby scored his second goal of the game and the third of the tie. Shaun Barker levelled matters again just over ten minutes later, but Chris Martin hit what proved to be the winner with eight minutes remaining, putting Norwich through to face Chelsea in the next round.

With just the league to focus on, Blackpool met Bristol City at Bloomfield Road on 17 February, and Wayne Andrews' strike ten minutes into the second half was enough to give the Robins the points.

Played	Won	Drawn	Lost	For	Against
30	13	8	9	44	34

On 20 February, Blackpool travelled to Nottingham Forest. Junior Agogo put Colin Calderwood's men ahead after sixteen minutes, and that's how it remained until Wes Hoolahan, Blackpool's resident penalty-taker, equalised with an injury-time spot-kick.

Millwall made a trip to the seaside on 24 February, and they returned to London with all three points thanks to Dave Brammer's strike just shy of the thirty-minute mark.

Oldham hosted Blackpool on 27 February, with three former Seasiders players in their team (Les Pogliacomi, Richie Wellens and Paul Edwards). A single goal, scored by Andy Morrell after 67 minutes, resulted in a Blackpool victory.

Into March, Blackpool travelled to Gillingham on the third of the month. Dean McDonald put the home side ahead inside the first ten minutes, only to see Ben Burgess level the score three minutes later. Andrew Crofts (34') struck to put the Gills ahead at the interval. David Fox scored the game's fourth goal just under twenty minutes into the second half, and the game ended 2–2.

AFC Bournemouth made the long midweek trip to Lancashire on 6 March. Adrian Forbes opened his league account with a goal on 36 minutes. This was doubled ten minutes into the second half by Ben Burgess, with his second goal in as many games.

Another south-coast club, this time Brighton & Hove Albion, were the visitors to Bloomfield Road four days later, and they returned to East Sussex with a point after a goalless draw.

On 17 March, Blackpool faced Yeovil Town at Huish Park. Andy Morrell put Blackpool ahead after 56 minutes, and they held on for the win despite having Shaun Barker sent off two minutes later.

Bradford City were the Seasiders' opponents on 24 March. Robbie Williams, who joined Blackpool on loan from Barnsley two days earlier, opened the scoring on six minutes. A second goal did not arrive until the 77th minute, and it was Andy Morrell who doubled Blackpool's lead. Omar Daley pulled one back for the Bantams, but they were reduced to ten men when Steven Schumacher was dismissed eight minutes later. Scott Vernon sealed the game for Blackpool with a third goal, in injury time.

Rotherham United, then bottom of the table, hosted the Tangerines on 27 March, and Chris O'Grady's strike on the hour mark was enough to seal the points for the Millers.

On 31 March, Blackpool welcomed Crewe Alexandra to Bloomfield Road. Wes Hoolahan put the home side ahead after fourteen minutes. Robbie Williams added a second just short of an hour. Shaun Miller scored an injury-time consolation for the Railwaymen.

Played	Won	Drawn	Lost	For	Against
40	18	11	11	56	41

Tranmere Rovers made the short trip up the coast from the Wirral on 7 April. Keigan Parker put the Tangerines ahead after eight minutes, a lead which lasted twenty minutes — Calvin Zola scoring; however, Wes Hoolahan restored Blackpool's lead nine minutes before half-time. Zola equalised for a second time one minute after the break, but Andy Morrell scored what proved to be the winner on 73 minutes. Rovers had John Mullin and Jason McAteer dismissed on 52 and 53 minutes, respectively.

Blackpool met Huddersfield Town for the third time this season, at the Galpharm Stadium on 9 April. Claus Bech Jørgensen scored his first league goal of the season after 28 minutes to put Blackpool ahead. Robbie Williams doubled the lead after 58 minutes, and the game finished 2–0.

On 14 April, Blackpool faced Northampton Town at Bloomfield Road. Simon Cox gave the visitors the lead at half-time with a strike on 42 minutes. Chris Brandon, who joined Blackpool on loan from Huddersfield the previous month, equalised four minutes after coming on as a half-time substitute. A Wes Hoolahan penalty on 55 minutes put the Seasiders ahead for the first time, and seven minutes later Brandon scored his second and Blackpool's third. A Sean Dyche own goal six minutes from time sealed a 4–1 victory for the hosts.

Blackpool travelled to Cheltenham seven days later. Robbie Williams scored his fourth goal in seven games to give the Seasiders the lead six minutes before half-time. John Finnigan equalised from the penalty spot on 51 minutes, but Keith Southern scored his fifth goal of the season with five minutes remaining to give Blackpool all three points. Blackpool's victory guaranteed them at least a place in the play-offs.

On 28 April, Blackpool hosted Scunthorpe United at Bloomfield Road. Claus Bech Jørgensen opened the scoring after seven minutes in front of a crowd of over 9,000. Keigan Parker scored a second on 26 minutes, and twelve minutes later Chris Brandon was sent off. Billy Sharp halved Scunthorpe's deficit four minutes before half-time. Shaun Barker made it 3–1 on 56 minutes, and ten-man Blackpool held on for the win and moved just two points behind the second automatic-promotion position. Scunthorpe, despite their defeat, were crowned champions.

Simon Grayson was named League One Manager of the Month for April, his second such accolade of the season.

The final game of the regular season occurred on 5 May, with Blackpool's visiting Swansea City. Izzy Iriekpen put the Welsh club ahead on 14 minutes. The lead lasted only eleven minutes, however — Andy Morrell scoring the equaliser. Keigan Parker completed the turnaround just after the half-hour mark, and Blackpool led 2–1 at half-time. Two minutes into the second period, Lee Trundle put the Swans back on level terms. Iriekpen put the home side back in the lead on 55 minutes. Andy Morrell evened matters up again two minutes later, and then put Blackpool ahead on 61 minutes, completing his hat-trick in the process. He scored his fourth and Blackpool's fifth on 78 minutes, and Keigan Parker completed the rout with his second in the final minute. Blackpool won 6–3, and cemented their place in the play-offs with a third-placed finish in the table. The result also ended Swansea's play-off hopes and meant Blackpool finished as the division's top scorers.

Blackpool and Oldham Athletic met in the two-legged semi-finals of the play-offs. Blackpool won both legs — 2–1 at Boundary Park on 13 May and 3–1 at Bloomfield Road six days later.

On 27 May, Blackpool met Yeovil Town in the final at the new Wembley Stadium, taking 28,600 fans to their first appearance at England's national stadium in fifteen years. Blackpool won 2–0, a club-record tenth-consecutive victory, and were promoted to The Championship.

== First-team squad ==
Squad No.	Name	Position(s)	Nationality	Place of birth	Date of Birth	Apps	Goals	Signed from	Date signed	Fee
Goalkeepers
1	Lee Jones	GK	(Wales)	Pontypridd	9 August 1970 (aged 35)	93	0	(England) Stockport County	27 August 2003 (Note: Player had a previous loan spell at the club. Date of signing refers to the date of the player's first permanent spell at the club.)	Free
1	Paul Rachubka	GK	(United States) (England)	San Luis Obispo	21 May 1981 (aged 25)	0	0	(England) Huddersfield Town	31 January 2007	Loan
13	Kyle Clancy	GK	(England)	Barking	16 November 1989 (aged 16)	0	0	(England) Blackpool F.C. Academy	July 2006	Free
21	Rhys Evans	GK	(England)	Swindon	27 January 1982 (aged 24)	0	0	(England) Swindon Town	1 July 2006	Free
23	Lewis Edge	GK	(England)	Morecambe	12 January 1987 (aged 19)	6	0	(England) Blackpool F.C. Academy	November 2003	Free
31	Joe Hart	GK	(England)	Shrewsbury	19 April 1987 (aged 19)	0	0	(England) Manchester City	8 April 2007	Loan
Defenders
2	Danny Coid	RB/LB/CM	(England)	Liverpool	3 October 1981 (aged 24)	259	14	(England) Blackpool F.C. Academy	1 August 1998	Free
3	Paul Tierney	LB	(England)	Salford	15 September 1982 (aged 23)	0	0	(Scotland) Livingston	2 June 2006	Free
5	Michael Jackson	CB	(England)	Chester	4 December 1973 (aged 32)	0	0	(England) Tranmere Rovers	23 June 2006	Free
6	Andy Wilkinson	CB	(England)	Yarnfield	6 August 1984 (aged 21)	0	0	(England) Stoke City	20 October 2006	Loan
6	Robbie Williams	LB	(England)	Pontefract	2 January 1984 (aged 22)	0	0	(England) Barnsley	22 March 2007	Loan
12	Marc Joseph	CB	(England) (Antigua and Barbuda)	Leicester	10 November 1976 (aged 29)	16	0	(England) Hull City	11 January 2006	Free
19	Phil Doughty	CB	(England)	Blackpool	6 September 1986 (aged 19)	4	0	(England) Blackpool F.C. Academy	1 December 2002	Free
25	Shaun Barker	RB/CB	(England)	Trowell	19 September 1982 (aged 23)	0	0	(England) Rotherham United	2 August 2006	Free
29	Ian Evatt	CB	(England)	Coventry	19 November 1981 (aged 24)	0	0	(England) Queens Park Rangers	3 August 2006	Loan
30	Vincent Fernandez	CB	(France)	Marseille	19 September 1986 (aged 19)	0	0	(England) Nottingham Forest	23 November 2006	Loan
31	Carl Dickinson	LB	(England)	Swadlingcote	31 March 1987 (aged 19)	0	0	(England) Stoke City	20 October 2006	Loan
33	Kaspars Gorkšs	CB	(Latvia)	Riga	6 November 1981 (aged 24)	0	0	(Latvia) FK Ventspils	1 January 2007	Free
Midfielders
4	Keith Southern	DM/CM	(England)	Gateshead	24 April 1984 (aged 22)	156	16	(England) Everton	8 November 2002	Undisclosed
8	Adrian Forbes	RM	(England)	Greenford	23 January 1979 (aged 27)	0	0	(England) Swansea City	1 July 2006	Free
11	Chris Brandon	CM	(England)	Bradford	7 April 1976 (aged 30)	0	0	(England) Huddersfield Town	21 March 2007	Loan
11	Rory Prendergast	CM	(England)	Pontefract	6 April 1976 (aged 30)	28	0	(England) Accrington Stanley	22 July 2005	Free
15	Ciaran Donnelly	CM	(England)	Blackpool	2 April 1984 (aged 22)	44	2	(England) Blackburn Rovers	16 March 2005	Free
16	Jamie Burns	CM	(England)	Blackpool	6 March 1984 (aged 22)	60	4	(England) Blackpool F.C. Academy	1 July 2003	Free
17	Simon Wiles	CM	(England)	Preston	22 April 1985 (aged 21)	48	3	(England) Blackpool F.C. Academy	14 October 2003	Free
20	David Fox	CM/DM	(England)	Leek	13 November 1983 (aged 22)	7	1	(England) Manchester United	January 2006	Free
22	Marcus Bean	CM	(Jamaica)	Bournemouth	2 November 1984 (aged 21)	17	1	(England) Queens Park Rangers	24 January 2006	Free
24	Sean Paterson	CM	(Scotland)	Greenock	26 March 1987 (aged 19)	2	0	(England) Blackpool F.C. Academy	2004	Free
26	Claus Jørgensen	CM/AM	(Faroe Islands) (Denmark)	Holstebro	27 April 1979 (aged 27)	0	0	(England) Coventry City	8 September 2006	Free
30	Simon Gillett	CM	(England)	Oxford	6 November 1985 (aged 20)	0	0	(England) Southampton	9 August 2006	Loan
32	Matty Kay	CM	(England)	Blackpool	12 October 1989 (aged 16)	1	0	(England) Blackpool F.C. Academy	13 November 2005	Free
34	Gareth Farrelly	CM	(Republic of Ireland)	Dublin	28 August 1975 (aged 30)	0	0	(Republic of Ireland) Bohemians	17 November 2006	Free
Forwards
7	Keigan Parker	ST	(Scotland)	Livingston	8 June 1982 (aged 23)	86	25	(Scotland) St Johnstone	25 June 2004	Free
9	John Murphy	ST	(England)	St Helens	18 October 1976 (aged 29)	298	104	(England) Chester City	6 August 1999	Free
10	Scott Vernon	ST	(England)	Manchester	13 December 1983 (aged 22)	24	5	(England) Oldham Athletic	9 June 2005	Part-exchange
14	Matthew Blinkhorn	ST	(England)	Blackpool	2 March 1985 (aged 21)	54	10	(England) Blackpool F.C. Academy	28 June 2003	Free
18	Andy Morrell	ST	(England)	Doncaster	28 September 1974 (aged 31)	0	0	(England) Coventry City	15 August 2006	Free
28	Ben Burgess	ST	(Republic of Ireland) (England)	Buxton	9 November 1981 (aged 24)	0	0	(England) Hull City	31 August 2006	£100,000
28	Danny Graham	ST	(England)	Gateshead	12 August 1985 (aged 20)	0	0	(England) Middlesbrough	2 August 2006	Loan

== Competitions ==
=== Football League One ===
==== League table ====
Pos	Team	Pld	W	D	L	GF	GA	GD	Pts	Promotion, qualification or relegation
1	Scunthorpe United (C, P)	46	26	13	7	73	35	+38	91	Promotion to Football League Championship
2	Bristol City (P)	46	25	10	11	63	39	+24	85	Promotion to Football League Championship
3	Blackpool (O, P)	46	24	11	11	76	49	+27	83	Qualification for League One play-offs
4	Nottingham Forest	46	23	13	10	65	41	+24	82	Qualification for League One play-offs
5	Yeovil Town	46	23	10	13	55	39	+16	79	Qualification for League One play-offs

Rules for classification: In the Football League goals scored (GF) takes precedence over goal difference (GD).
(C) Champions; (O) Play-off winners; (P) Promoted

==== Results ====
===== In summary =====
Overall								Home						Away					
Pld	W	D	L	GF	GA	GD	Pts	W	D	L	GF	GA	GD	W	D	L	GF	GA	GD
46	24	11	11	76	49	+27	83	12	6	5	40	25	+15	12	5	6	36	24	+12

Source: Sky

===== By matchday =====
Matchday	1	2	3	4	5	6	7	8	9	10	11	12	13	14	15	16	17	18	19	20	21	22	23	24	25	26	27	28	29	30	31	32	33	34	35	36	37	38	39	40	41	42	43	44	45	46
Ground	A	H	H	A	H	A	A	H	H	A	A	H	A	H	A	H	A	H	A	H	H	A	A	H	H	A	H	A	H	H	A	H	A	A	H	H	A	A	A	H	H	A	H	A	H	A
Result	L	L	L	W	D	D	L	D	D	D	L	W	W	D	W	W	D	W	L	W	D	W	W	W	W	L	W	W	L	L	D	L	W	D	W	D	W	W	L	W	W	W	W	W	W	W
Position	17	23	23	18	17	20	22	22	21	21	21	21	19	20	14	12	14	10	10	9	11	7	7	6	5	7	6	6	7	8	8	10	8	8	7	6	6	6	6	6	5	4	4	4	4	3

Updated to match(es) played on 05 May 2007. Source: 11v11
A = Away; H = Home; W = Win; D = Draw; L = Loss

===== In detail =====
5 August 2006 1	Brentford	1–0	Blackpool	Brentford
15:00 BST	Charles (yellow card) 41'; Brooker (yellow card) 58'; Skúlason 74'	Report	Prendergast (yellow card) 44'; Fox (yellow card) 48'	Stadium: Griffin Park; Attendance: 6,048; Referee: Phil Joslin

5 August 2006 2	Blackpool	0–2	Nottingham Forest	Blackpool
19:45 BST		Report	Lester 45'; Holt 73'; Bennett (yellow card) 76'	Stadium: Bloomfield Road; Attendance: 7,635; Referee: Clive Oliver

12 August 2006 3	Blackpool	0–1	Rotherham United	Blackpool
15:00 BST	Gillett (yellow card) 76'	Report	Hoskins 78'	Stadium: Bloomfield Road; Attendance: 5,677; Referee: Kevin Friend

19 August 2006 4	Bristol City	2–4	Blackpool	Bristol
15:00 BST	Showunmi 43', 64' (pen.)	Report	Vernon 27'; Jackson 50'; Parker 77'; Graham 89'	Stadium: Ashton Gate; Attendance: 10,630; Referee: Mike Russell

26 August 2006 5	Blackpool	1–1	Gillingham	Blackpool
15:00 BST	Vernon 35'; Parker (yellow card) 73'	Report	Ndumbu-Nsungu 3'; Flynn (yellow card) 14'	Stadium: Bloomfield Road; Attendance: 5,056; Referee: Mike Pike

2 September 2006 6	Millwall	0–0	Blackpool	Millwall
15:00 BST	Whitbread (yellow card) 40'	Report	Evatt (yellow card) 13'; Bean (yellow card) 73'	Stadium: The Den; Attendance: 7,692; Referee: Kevin Wright

9 September 2006 7	Port Vale	2–1	Blackpool	Burslem
15:00 BST	McGregor (yellow card) 27'; Constantine 45'; Sodje 68'	Report	Joseph (yellow card) 26'; Southern 90'	Stadium: Vale Park; Attendance: 5,171; Referee: Phil Joslin

12 September 2006 8	Blackpool	1–1	Chesterfield	Blackpool
19:45 BST	Gillett 33'; Hoolahan (yellow card) 75'; Morrell (yellow card) 90'	Report	Allott (yellow card) 52'; Hurst 60'	Stadium: Bloomfield Road; Attendance: 4,600; Referee: Colin Webster

16 September 2006 9	Blackpool	2–2	Oldham Athletic	Blackpool
15:00 BST	Vernon 41'; Southern (yellow card) 54'; Gillett (yellow card) 57'; Morrell 90', (yellow card) 90'; Evatt (yellow card) 90'	Report	Wellens (yellow card) 57', (goal) 63'; Porter 72', (yellow card) 80'	Stadium: Bloomfield Road; Attendance: 6,794; Referee: Michael Jones

23 September 2006 10	Doncaster Rovers	0–0	Blackpool	Doncaster
15:00 BST	Lee (yellow card) 63'	Report	Parker (yellow card) 84'; Evatt (yellow card) 90+2'	Stadium: Earth Stadium; Attendance: 5,424; Referee: Grant Hegley

26 September 2006 11	Carlisle United	2–0	Blackpool	Carlisle
19:45 BST	Lumsdon 18'; Hawley 88'	Report		Stadium: Brunton Park; Attendance: 8,401; Referee: Eddie Ilderton

30 September 2006 12	Blackpool	3–0	Leyton Orient	Blackpool
15:00 BST	Morrell 21'; Hoolahan 82' (pen.); Parker 86'	Report	Tann (red card) 81'; Ibehre (yellow card) 90+2'	Stadium: Bloomfield Road; Attendance: 5,298; Referee: Martin Atkinson

7 October 2006 13	Brighton and Hove Albion	0–3	Blackpool	Brighton
13:30 BST	Frutos (red card) 72'	Report	Southern 17'; Vernon 61', 87'; Barker (yellow card) 64'	Stadium: Withdean Stadium; Attendance: 5,146; Referee: Paul Armstrong

14 October 2006 14	Blackpool	1–1	Yeovil Town	Blackpool
15:00 BST	Vernon 56'; Hoolahan (yellow card) 90+4'	Report	Jones (yellow card) 60'; Stewart 86'	Stadium: Bloomfield Road; Attendance: 6,812; Referee: Nigel Miller

21 October 2006 15	Crewe Alexandra	1–2	Blackpool	Crewe
15:00 BST	Maynard 67'; Higdon (yellow card) 81'	Report	Morrell 3'; Southern (yellow card) 24'; Gillett (yellow card) 61' (yellow-red card) 79'; Barker 90'	Stadium: Gresty Road; Attendance: 5,765; Referee: Carl Boyeson

28 October 2006 16	Blackpool	4–1	Bradford City	Blackpool
15:00 BST	Fox 39'; Hoolahan 45' (pen.), (yellow card) 74'; Parker 64', 70'	Report	Parker (yellow card) 22'; Johnson 84'; Schumacher (yellow card) 89'; Windass (yellow card) 90'; Brown (red card) 90'	Stadium: Bloomfield Road; Attendance: 7,937; Referee: Rob Shoebridge

4 November 2006 17	Northampton Town	1–1	Blackpool	Northampton
15:00 GMT	Jess 62'	Report	Morrell 20'; Hoolahan (yellow card) 55'; Fox (yellow card) 74'	Stadium: Sixfields Stadium; Attendance: 5,762; Referee: Keith Hill

18 November 2006 18	Blackpool	3–1	Huddersfield Town	Blackpool
15:00 GMT	Dickinson (yellow card) 18'; Parker 26'; Morrell (yellow card) 29', (goal) 60'; Southern 30'; Fox (yellow card) 70'	Report	Young (yellow card) 21'; Taylor-Fletcher 45'; Schofield (yellow card) 66'	Stadium: Bloomfield Road; Attendance: 7,414; Referee: Tony Bates

24 November 2006 19	Tranmere Rovers	2–0	Blackpool	Birkenhead
19:45 GMT	Greenacre 2'; McLaren (yellow card) 9'; Davies (yellow card) 25', (goal) 67'; Goodison (yellow card) 59'	Report	Hoolahan (yellow card) 45'	Stadium: Prenton Park; Attendance: 8,247; Referee: Darren Drysdale

5 December 2006 20	Blackpool	2–1	Cheltenham Town	Blackpool
19:45 GMT	Morrell 29'; Hoolahan 80'; Jackson (yellow card) 85'	Report	Spencer 14', (yellow card) 90'; O'Leary (yellow card) 60'; Melligan (yellow card) 85'	Stadium: Bloomfield Road; Attendance: 4,851; Referee: Rob Shoebridge

9 December 2006 21	Blackpool	1–1	Swansea City	Blackpool
19:45 GMT	Vernon 83'; Dickinson 21' (o.g.)	Report	Craney (yellow card) 43'; Gueret (yellow card) 48'	Stadium: Bloomfield Road; Attendance: 6,216; Referee: Scott Mathieson

15 December 2006 22	Scunthorpe United	1–3	Blackpool	Scunthorpe
19:45 GMT	Murphy (yellow card) 57'; Foster (yellow card) 65'; Baraclough 90'	Report	Morrell 27'; Hoolahan 58' (pen.), (yellow card) 58' (yellow-red card) 73'; Parker 88'	Stadium: Glanford Park; Attendance: 4,527; Referee: Eddie Ilderton

23 December 2006 23	AFC Bournemouth	1–3	Blackpool	Bournemouth
15:00 GMT	Fletcher (yellow card) 44'; Hayter (yellow card) 54'; Anderton (yellow card) 55' (yellow-red card) 69'; Young (yellow card) 70'; Gillett 82'	Report	Parker (yellow card) 45', (goal) 47', 52'; Forbes (yellow card) 87'; Fox 88'	Stadium: Fitness First Stadium; Attendance: 5,758; Referee: Eddie Ilderton

26 December 2006 24	Blackpool	2–1	Carlisle United	Blackpool
13:00 GMT	Murphy 5' (o.g.); Parker 29'; Barker (yellow card) 30'; Evans (yellow card) 74'	Report	Lumsdon (yellow card) 45+1'; McDermott (yellow card) 49'; Hawley 73'; Raven (yellow card) 82'	Stadium: Bloomfield Road; Attendance: 9,473; Referee: Graham Laws

30 December 2006 25	Blackpool	3–1	Doncaster Rovers	Blackpool
15:00 GMT	Vernon 77', 83'; Jørgensen (yellow card) 79'; Barker 81'	Report	O'Connor (yellow card) 74'; Heffernan 90+2'	Stadium: Bloomfield Road; Attendance: 7,952; Referee: Kevin Wright

1 January 2007 26	Chesterfield	2–0	Blackpool	Chesterfield
15:00 GMT	Hurst 13'; Folan 42'; Allott (yellow card) 72'	Report	Jackson (yellow card) 78'; Evatt (yellow card) 90'	Stadium: Saltergate; Attendance: 4,351; Referee: Ray Olivier

13 January 2007 27	Blackpool	2–1	Port Vale	Blackpool
15:00 GMT	Morrell 72'; Fox 76'	Report	Sodje 90+2' (pen.)	Stadium: Bloomfield Road; Attendance: 6,661; Referee: Mark Haywood

20 January 2007 28	Leyton Orient	0–1	Blackpool	Leyton
15:00 GMT	Easton (yellow card) 84'	Report	Hoolahan (yellow card) 36'; Southern 85'	Stadium: Matchroom Stadium; Attendance: 5,217; Referee: Rob Lewis

3 February 2007 29	Blackpool	1–3	Brentford	Blackpool
15:00 GMT	Morrell (yellow card) 64'; Vernon 90'	Report	Frampton 13'; Kuffour 29', 30'; Pinault (yellow card) 87'	Stadium: Bloomfield Road; Attendance: 6,086; Referee: Pat Miller

17 February 2007 30	Blackpool	0–1	Bristol City	Blackpool
15:00 GMT		Report	Fontaine (yellow card) 45'; Andrews 53'; Murray (yellow card) 89'	Stadium: Bloomfield Road; Attendance: 6,696; Referee: Clive Oliver

20 February 2007 31	Nottingham Forest	1–1	Blackpool	West Bridgford
19:45 GMT	Agogo 16'; Perch (yellow card) 21'; Prutton (yellow card) 89'; Bennett (yellow card) 90'	Report	Hoolahan (yellow card) 36', (goal) 90' (pen.)	Stadium: City Ground; Attendance: 16,849; Referee: Gary Sutton

24 February 2007 32	Blackpool	0–1	Millwall	Blackpool
15:00 GMT		Report	Brammer 29'	Stadium: Bloomfield Road; Attendance: 6,547; Referee: Andy Woolmer

27 February 2007 33	Oldham Athletic	0–1	Blackpool	Oldham
19:45 GMT	Haining (yellow card) 88'	Report	Morrell 67'; Hoolahan (yellow card) 73'; Parker (yellow card) 82'	Stadium: Boundary Park; Attendance: 6,956; Referee: Andy Penn

3 March 2007 34	Gillingham	2–2	Blackpool	Gillingham
15:00 GMT	McDonald 9'; Crofts 34'; Jackman (yellow card) 81'	Report	Burgess 12'; Gillett (yellow card) 41'; Coid (yellow card) 59'; Fox 64'	Stadium: Priestfield Stadium; Attendance: 5,949; Referee: Darren Deadman

6 March 2007 35	Blackpool	2–0	AFC Bournemouth	Blackpool
19:45 GMT	Forbes 36'; Burgess 54'; Fox (yellow card) 74'; Morrell (yellow card) 78'	Report	McGoldrick (yellow card) 88'; Cummings (yellow card) 89'	Stadium: Bloomfield Road; Attendance: 6,184; Referee: Dean Whitestone

10 March 2007 36	Blackpool	0–0	Brighton and Hove Albion	Blackpool
15:00 GMT		Report		Stadium: Bloomfield Road; Attendance: 8,164; Referee: Anthony Taylor

17 March 2007 37	Yeovil Town	0–1	Blackpool	Yeovil
15:00 GMT	Gray (yellow card) 7'; Forbes (yellow card) 67'	Report	Barker (yellow card) 37' (yellow-red card) 59'; Morrell 57'	Stadium: Huish Park; Attendance: 6,012; Referee: Paul Armstrong

24 March 2007 38	Bradford City	1–3	Blackpool	Bradford
15:00 GMT	Schumacher (yellow card) 53' (yellow-red card) 69'; Daley 61'; Ashikodi (yellow card) 70'; Colbeck (yellow card) 80'	Report	Williams 6', (yellow card) 45'; Jørgensen (yellow card) 62'; Forbes (yellow card) 63'; Fox (yellow card) 68'; Morrell 77'; Vernon 90'; Parker (yellow card) 90'	Stadium: Intersonic Stadium; Attendance: 8,984; Referee: Steve Bratt

27 March 2007 39	Rotherham United	1–0	Blackpool	Rotherham
19:45 BST	O'Grady 60'; Cutler (yellow card) 85'	Report	Jackson (yellow card) 19'; Jørgensen (yellow card) 30'; Forbes (yellow card) 57'	Stadium: Millmoor; Attendance: 4,025; Referee: Dave Foster

31 March 2007 40	Blackpool	2–1	Crewe Alexandra	Blackpool
15:00 BST	Hoolahan 15'; Williams 57'	Report	Lowe (yellow card) 63'; Baudet (yellow card) 68'; Miller 90'	Stadium: Bloomfield Road; Attendance: 7,203; Referee: Keith Hill

7 April 2007 41	Blackpool	3–2	Tranmere Rovers	Blackpool
15:00 BST	Parker 9'; Hoolahan 36'; Morrell 73'; Brandon (yellow card) 83'	Report	Zola 29', 46'; Taylor (yellow card) 37'; Mullin (red card) 52'; McAteer (red card) 53'; Schuker (yellow card) 54'	Stadium: Bloomfield Road; Attendance: 8,091; Referee: Ray Olivier

9 April 2007 42	Huddersfield Town	0–2	Blackpool	Huddersfield
15:00 BST	Worthington (yellow card) 47'	Report	Williams (yellow card) 7', (goal) 59'; Jørgensen 29'; Parker (yellow card) 66'	Stadium: Galpharm Stadium; Attendance: 11,432; Referee: Mark Clattenburg

14 April 2007 43	Blackpool	4–1	Northampton Town	Blackpool
15:00 BST	Brandon 49', 62'; Hoolahan 55' (pen.); Dyche 84' (o.g.)	Report	Hunt (yellow card) 37'; Cox 42'; Bunn (yellow card) 53'; Hughes (yellow card) 56'; Aiston (yellow card) 64'; Gilligan (yellow card) 89'	Stadium: Bloomfield Road; Attendance: 7,334; Referee: Mike Russell

21 April 2007 44	Cheltenham Town	1–2	Blackpool	Cheltenham
15:00 BST	Finnigan 51' (pen.), (yellow card) 90'; Melligan (yellow card) 68'	Report	Williams 39'; Jackson (yellow card) 62'; Southern 85'	Stadium: Whaddon Road; Attendance: 5,093; Referee: Pat Miller

28 April 2007 45	Blackpool	3–1	Scunthorpe United	Blackpool
15:00 BST	Jørgensen 8'; Parker 26'; Brandon (red card) 38'; Morrell (yellow card) 45'; Barker 56'; Gillett (yellow card) 81'	Report	Sharp (yellow card) 33', (goal) 41'; Sparrow (yellow card) 45'; Goodwin (yellow card) 74'	Stadium: Bloomfield Road; Attendance: 9,482; Referee: Jonathan Moss

5 May 2007 46	Swansea City	3–6	Blackpool	Swansea
15:00 BST	Iriekpen 14', 55'; Trundle 47'	Report	Morrell 25', 57', 61', 78'; Parker 32', 89'	Stadium: Liberty Stadium; Attendance: 18,903; Referee: Andre Marriner

=== Football League One play-offs ===
==== Semi-finals ====
13 May 2007 First leg	Oldham Athletic	1–2	Blackpool	Oldham
17:30 BST	Gregan (yellow card) 20'; Wellens (yellow card) 27'; Liddell 75' (pen.); Edwards (yellow card) 90'	Report	Jørgensen (yellow card) 28'; Forbes (yellow card) 44'; Barker 52'; Parker (yellow card) 83'; Williams (yellow card) 86'; Hoolahan 87'	Stadium: Boundary Park; Attendance: 12,154; Referee: Iain Williamson

19 May 2007 Second leg	Blackpool	3–1	Oldham Athletic	Blackpool
12:00 BST	Southern 28', (yellow card) 38'; Parker (yellow card) 65', (goal) 90'; Morrell 75'	Report	Wellens (yellow card) 17'; Wolfenden 83'	Stadium: Bloomfield Road; Attendance: 9,453; Referee: Lee Probert

==== Final ====
27 May 2007 final	Yeovil Town	0–2	Blackpool	Wembley
15:00 BST	Barry (yellow card) 45'; Morris (yellow card) 50'	Report	Williams 43'; Barker (yellow card) 45'; Parker 52'	Stadium: Wembley Stadium; Attendance: 59,313; Referee: Andy D'Urso

=== FA Cup ===
11 November 2006 First Round	Huddersfield Town	1–2	Blackpool	Huddersfield
15:00 GMT	Collins (yellow card) 11'; Holdsworth (yellow card) 45'; Worthington (yellow card) 57'	Report	Hoolahan 70' (pen.); Southern (yellow card) 45'	Stadium: Galpharm Stadium; Attendance: 6,597; Referee: Andy Hall

2 December 2006 Second Round	Milton Keynes Dons	0–2	Blackpool	Milton Keynes
15:00 GMT	O'Hanlon (yellow card) 67'; Wilbraham (yellow card) 73'	Report	Parker 31'; Morrell 48'	Stadium: National Hockey Stadium; Attendance: 3,837; Referee: Grant Hegley

6 January 2007 Third Round	Blackpool	4–2	Aldershot Town	Blackpool
15:00 GMT	Vernon 4'; Morrell 7', 73'; Burgess 80' (pen.)	Report	Barnard (yellow card) 14'; Grant 27'; Newman 79'; Pritchard 88'	Stadium: Bloomfield Road; Attendance: 6,355; Referee: Clive Oliver

27 January 2007 Fourth Round	Blackpool	1–1	Norwich City	Blackpool
15:00 GMT	Hoolahan (yellow card) 45'; Evatt 52'; Southern 72'; Jackson (yellow card) 83'	Report	Huckerby 45', (yellow card) 86'; Colin (yellow card) 45'; Brown (yellow card) 45' (yellow-red card) 82'	Stadium: Bloomfield Road; Attendance: 9,491; Referee: Chris Foy

13 February 2007 Fourth Round replay	Norwich City	3–2	Blackpool	Norwich
19:45 GMT	Huckerby (yellow card) 8', (goal) 78', 95'; Etuhu (yellow card) 18'; Safri (yellow card) 52'; Marshall (yellow card) 90'; Martin 112'	Report	Jackson 37'; Southern (yellow card) 64'; Barker (yellow card) 104', (goal) 108'	Stadium: Carrow Road; Attendance: 19,120; Referee: Andre Marriner

=== Football League Cup ===
22 August 2006 First Round	Blackpool	2–2 (a.e.t.) (2–4 p)	Barnsley	Blackpool
19:45 BST	Tierney (yellow card) 50'; Vernon 70', 120'; Southern (yellow card) 90'	Report	Coulson (yellow card) 5'; Williams 53' (pen.), (yellow card) 116'; Devaney 117'	Stadium: Bloomfield Road; Attendance: 3,938; Referee: Graham Laws
	Penalties
	Vernon (penalty scored); Jackson (penalty missed); Southern (penalty scored); Parker (penalty missed)		(penalty scored) McIndoe; (penalty scored) Devaney; (penalty scored) Hayes; (penalty scored) Hassell

=== Football League Trophy ===
31 October 2006 Second Round	Accrington Stanley	4–4 (a.e.t.) (4–2 p)	Blackpool	Accrington
19:45 GMT	Harris (yellow card) 11'; Craney 44'; Todd 59'; Mullin 65'; Richardson (yellow card) 75'; Williams 90'	Report	Gillett 31'; Barker 54'; Burgess 75' (pen.), 85'	Stadium: Fraser Eagle Stadium; Attendance: 1,344; Referee: Paul Robinson
	Penalties
	Craney (penalty scored); Brown (penalty scored); Todd (penalty scored); Procter (penalty scored)		(penalty scored) Gillett; (penalty missed) Burgess; (penalty scored) Dickinson; (penalty missed) Parker

== Player statistics ==
=== Appearances ===
Name	League	FA Cup	League Cup	Other	Total
Shaun Barker	45	5	1	4	55
Ian Evatt	44	5	1	4	54
Keigan Parker	45	4	1	4	54
Michael Jackson	43	5	1	3	52
Wes Hoolahan	42	3	1	3	49
Andy Morrell	40	4	1	3	48
Keith Southern	39	5	1	3	48
David Fox	37	5	1	2	45
Scott Vernon	38	4	1	1	44
Adrian Forbes	34	5	0	4	43
Rhys Evans	32	5	1	1	39
Claus Bech Jørgensen	31	4	0	4	39
Simon Gillett	31	0	0	3	34
Ben Burgess	27	3	0	2	32
Danny Coid	18	0	1	0	19
Kaspars Gorkšs	10	3	0	0	13
Paul Tierney	10	2	1	0	13
Robbie Williams	9	0	0	3	12
Paul Rachubka	8	0	0	3	11
Marcus Bean	6	2	1	1	10
Carl Dickinson	7	2	0	1	10
Marc Joseph	8	0	0	1	9
Andy Wilkinson	7	0	0	0	7
Rory Prendergast	5	0	1	0	6
Chris Brandon	5	0	0	0	5
Joe Hart	5	0	0	0	5
Danny Graham	4	0	0	0	4
Matthew Blinkhorn	2	0	0	1	3
Gareth Farrelly	1	1	0	0	2
Vincent Fernandez	1	1	0	0	2
Jamie Burns	0	0	0	0	0
Kyle Clancy	0	0	0	0	0
Ciaran Donnelly	0	0	0	1	1
Lewis Edge	1	0	0	0	1
Lee Jones	0	0	0	0	0
Matty Kay	0	0	0	0	0

Players used: 36

=== Goals ===
Name	League	FA Cup	League Cup	Other	Total
Andy Morrell	16	3	0	1	20
Keigan Parker	13	1	0	2	16
Scott Vernon	11	1	2	0	14
Wes Hoolahan	8	1	0	1	10
Shaun Barker	3	1	0	2	6
Keith Southern	5	0	0	1	6
Ben Burgess	2	1	0	2	5
Robbie Williams	4	0	0	1	5
David Fox	4	0	0	0	4
Chris Brandon	2	0	0	0	2
Simon Gillett	1	0	0	1	2
Michael Jackson	1	1	0	0	2
Claus Bech Jørgensen	2	0	0	0	2
Ian Evatt	0	1	0	0	1
Adrian Forbes	1	0	0	0	1
Danny Graham	1	0	0	0	1

Total goals scored: 97

== Transfers ==
=== In ===
Date	Player	From	Fee
21 July 2006	Wes Hoolahan	Livingston	Season-long loan
1 August 2006	Ian Evatt	Q.P.R.	Season-long loan
2 August 2006	Danny Graham	Middlesbrough	One-month loan
2 August 2006	Shaun Barker	Rotherham United	Unknown
9 August 2006	Simon Gillett	Southampton	Three-month loan
15 August 2006	Andy Morrell	Coventry City	Unknown
31 August 2006	Ben Burgess	Hull City	Unknown
20 October 2006	Carl Dickinson	Stoke City	Two-month loan
23 November 2006	Andy Wilkinson	Stoke City	Two-month loan
23 November 2006	Vincent Fernandez	Nottingham Forest	Two-month loan
1 January 2007	Kaspars Gorkšs	Ventspils	Unknown
30 January 2007	Simon Gillett	Southampton	Four-month loan
31 January 2007	Paul Rachubka	Huddersfield Town	Four-month loan
21 March 2007	Chris Brandon	Huddersfield Town	Two-month loan
22 March 2007	Robbie Williams	Barnsley	Two-month loan
8 April 2007	Joe Hart	Manchester City	One-month loan
1 June 2007	Ian Evatt	Q.P.R.	Free
3 June 2007	Paul Rachubka	Huddersfield Town	Free
5 July 2007	Michael Flynn	Gillingham	Free
5 July 2007	John Hills	Sheffield Wednesday	Free

=== Out ===
Date	Player	To	Fee
7 July 2006	Tony Butler	Forest Green	Free
27 July 2006	Neil Wood	Oldham Athletic	Free
1 August 2006	Peter Clarke	Southend United	Unknown
1 August 2006	Matt Shaw	Morecambe	Free
2 August 2006	Lewis Edge	Rochdale	One-month loan
13 October 2006	Lewis Edge	Bury	One-month loan
19 October 2006	Sean Paterson	Southport	One-month loan
27 October 2006	John Murphy	Macclesfield Town	Three-month loan
31 October 2006	Simon Wiles	Macclesfield Town	Five-month loan
22 November 2006	Matthew Blinkhorn	Macclesfield Town	Three-month loan
23 November 2006	Jamie Burns	Morecambe	Five-month loan
23 November 2006	Ciaran Donnelly	Southport	Five-month loan
8 December 2006	Lee Jones	Bury	One-month loan
6 January 2007	Sean Paterson	Southport	Three-month loan
8 January 2007	Lee Jones	Darlington	Free
16 January 2007	John Murphy	Macclesfield Town	Free
22 January 2007	Rory Prendergast	Rochdale	Free
31 January 2007	Lewis Edge	Rochdale	Three-month loan
16 February 2007	Dean Gordon	Torquay United	Unknown
2 March 2007	Matthew Blinkhorn	Morecambe	Two-month loan
22 March 2007	Stuart Anderson	Livingston	Free
31 May 2007	Sean Paterson		Released
31 May 2007	Ciaran Donnelly		Released
31 May 2007	Gareth Farrelly		Released
31 May 2007	Kyle Clancy		Released
21 June 2007	Marc Joseph	Rotherham United	Free
28 June 2007	Matthew Blinkhorn	Morecambe	Free
