= Ian Evatt =

English footballer (born 1981)

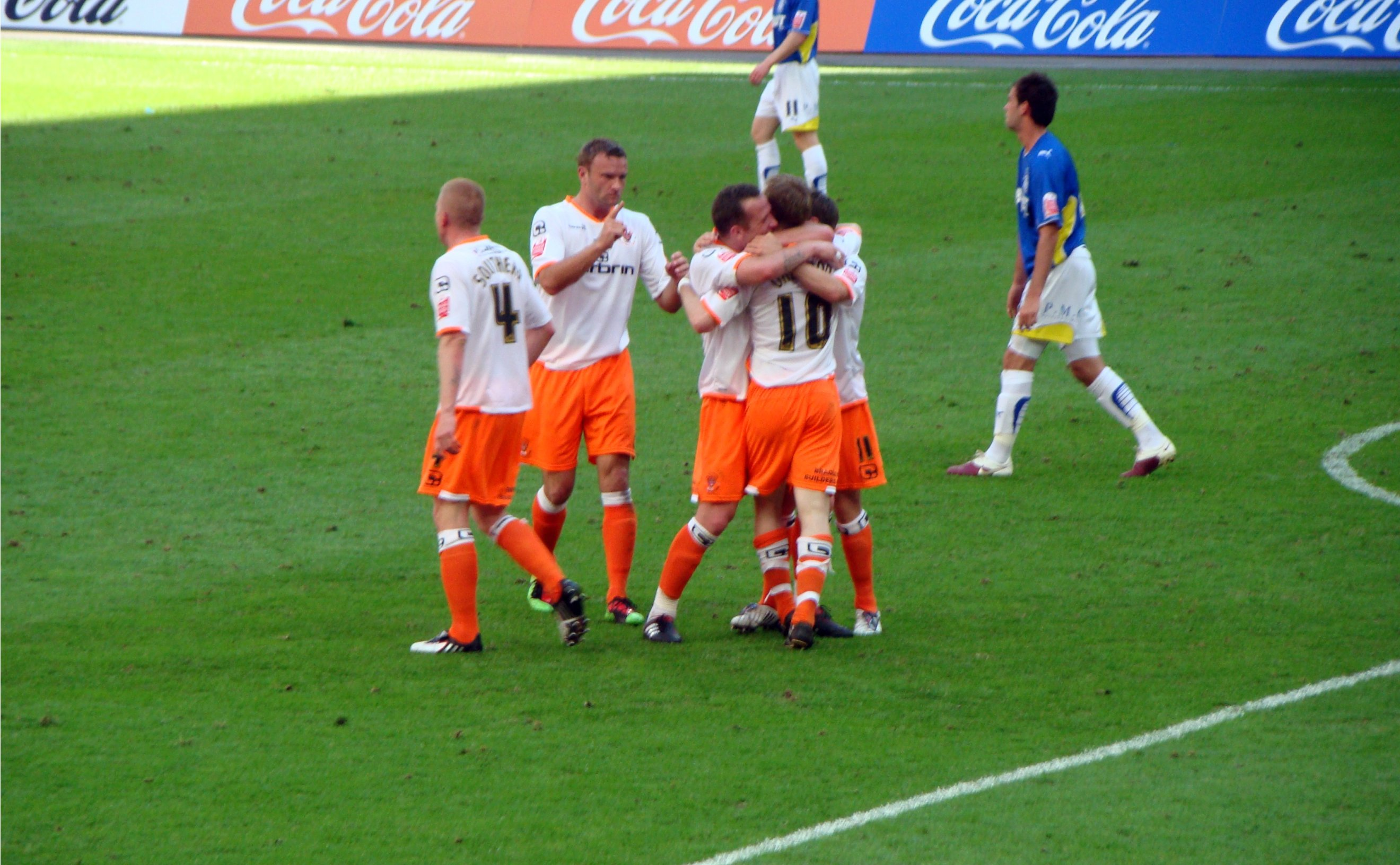
- Evatt (facing the camera) in 2010

Personal information
- Full name: Ian Ross Evatt
- Date of birth: 19 November 1981 (age 45)
- Place of birth: Coventry, England
- Height: 6 ft 3 in (1.91 m)
- Position: Centre-back

Youth career
- Derby County

Senior career*
Years	Team	Apps	(Gls)
1999–2003	Derby County	34	(0)
2001	→ Northampton Town (loan)	11	(0)
2003–2005	Chesterfield	84	(9)
2005–2007	Queens Park Rangers	27	(0)
2006–2007	→ Blackpool (loan)	25	(0)
2007–2013	Blackpool	205	(9)
2013–2018	Chesterfield	148	(4)
Total		534	(22)

Managerial career
- 2018: Chesterfield (caretaker)
- 2018–2020: Barrow
- 2020–2025: Bolton Wanderers
- 2025–2026: Blackpool
- * Club domestic league appearances and goals

Ian Ross Evatt (born 19 November 1981) is an English professional football manager and former player who was most recently the head coach of EFL League One club Blackpool.

Evatt began his career as a central midfielder, but was later converted to a centre-back.

He began his professional career in 1999 at Derby County, and he also played for Northampton Town (on loan), Chesterfield (in two spells), Queens Park Rangers and Blackpool.

As a player, he twice gained promotion with Blackpool (from the third tier of English football to its second tier in 2006–07, and from the second tier to the top flight in 2009–10) and once with Chesterfield (from the fourth tier to third tier, as champions, in 2013–14). As a manager, he won promotion with Barrow from the National League to League Two in 2019–20 and with Bolton from League Two to League One in 2020–21, as well as winning the EFL Trophy.

== Early life ==
Evatt was born in Coventry, West Midlands. As a child, he supported hometown club Coventry City. He attended Caludon Castle School for his secondary education.

== Playing career ==
=== Derby County ===
When he was ten years old, Evatt played for the district side in his hometown and was scouted by Derby County. He started with them from the age of 11. He signed his first professional contract on his 17th birthday in 1998. His first appearance in the Derby team came in the last match of the 2000–01 season, on 19 May 2001 at Pride Park, when he replaced Þórður Guðjónsson in the 78th minute. In the 2001–02 season, he spent two months on loan with Division Two club Northampton Town, from 10 August to 10 October 2001, playing in eleven Football League games. His next appearance for Derby came in April 2002, when he came on for Rob Lee against Newcastle United, then on the last day of the 2001–02 Premier League season he made his full debut against Sunderland, playing the full 90 minutes of a 1–1 draw at the Stadium of Light. Derby were relegated and the following season, under new manager John Gregory; Evatt was a regular starter in the side.

On 9 September 2002, Evatt scored The Rams' third goal as they beat Division Two club Mansfield Town 3–1 in the League Cup. In the following round against Oldham Athletic, Evatt found himself having to play in goal when Mart Poom was sent off.

Evatt started out as a central midfielder, before being moved to central defence. He said of the move: "I started off my career in midfield. I played a few games in the Premier League and, as I got bigger, I moved backwards but I enjoyed it. They saw the potential for me to be a better centre-half." Evatt suffered an injury in March 2003. Then, just before George Burley was appointed as manager to replace Gregory, who had been sacked in March, Evatt had to have a double hernia operation and he did not feature much for Derby afterwards.

He made a total of 34 league appearances for The Rams, including some in the Premier League, but was released by Burley at the end of the 2002–03 season.

=== Chesterfield ===
Evatt signed for Division Two club Chesterfield in July 2003, with manager Roy McFarland saying that Evatt was his number-one target to take to the club. Initially he played in midfield, where he struggled, before being moved by McFarland into central defence, where his performances improved. He went on to become the club captain and he won the Player of the Season award for the 2003–04 season. However, in the summer he needed a further hernia operation as the operation the previous year while he was with Derby did not fix the problem.

On 26 August 2004, Evatt signed a contract extension with the club to the summer of 2007, saying that it took him just five minutes to make the decision to sign, as he felt the club were "going in the right direction". In February 2005, Chesterfield turned down an offer for Evatt from Bristol City. He was also attracting interest from other clubs, including Leicester City.

At the end of the 2004–05 season, Evatt won the SIFA Player of the Season award and was runner-up in the CFSS Player of the Season Award. He made 84 league appearances for Chesterfield, scoring nine goals.

=== Queens Park Rangers ===
On 2 June 2005, Evatt signed a three-year contract with Championship club Queens Park Rangers for a fee of £150,000, under a clause in his contract at Chesterfield that allowed him to move if a six-figure bid was made. On 3 December 2005, during an away match against Stoke City at the Britannia Stadium, Evatt was assaulted by a Stoke fan. When a Stoke City player was sent off, resulting in a penalty being awarded to QPR, a young home fan ran onto the pitch and jumped at Evatt from behind, knocking him to the ground, where he was also alleged to have punched Evatt. The youth was arrested and subsequently charged with assault. He was banned from attending football matches for three years and at trial pleaded guilty to assault.

Evatt made 27 league appearances for QPR. On 1 August 2006 he was sent on a six-month loan to Blackpool, who were then in League One. He made 26 appearances for the Bloomfield Road club.

=== Blackpool ===
QPR terminated Evatt's contract, enabling him to join Blackpool on a permanent basis on 5 January 2007, during the transfer window. He signed an 18-month contract, with the League One club having an option for a further year.

Evatt scored his first goal for Blackpool in the fourth round of the FA Cup against Norwich City on 27 January 2007. His equaliser took the tie to a replay at Carrow Road.

On 19 March 2007, Evatt was named in the Press Association's League One "Team of the Week". In May 2007, he was part of the Blackpool team that won promotion to the Championship in the 2007 play-off final at Wembley Stadium.

After 2 1/2 months out with a medial knee ligament injury, Evatt returned to action on 8 December 2007, as a 65th-minute substitute for Michael Jackson in the West Lancashire derby against Preston North End. However, he was out of action again in early 2008 when he suffered back and hamstring injuries.

Evatt scored his first League goal for Blackpool on 25 October 2008 at Bloomfield Road when he headed their second equaliser in a 2–2 draw with Crystal Palace.

He made his 100th Football League appearance for Blackpool on 24 January 2009, in a 2–0 victory over Birmingham City at Bloomfield Road. On 2 April 2009, Evatt signed a new two-year contract with Blackpool, with an option for a further year.

Evatt scored his second League goal for Blackpool on 15 August 2009 in their first home game of the 2009–10 season, a 1–1 draw at Bloomfield Road against Cardiff City. His 300th career appearance was as a 36th-minute substitute in a 0–0 draw with Swansea City at the Liberty Stadium on 24 October. He was named in The Championship "Team of the Week" following his performance and goal in Blackpool's 4–1 home win over Scunthorpe United on 7 November.

After Blackpool's promotion to the Premier League, he was sent off half an hour into their second fixture, a 6–0 defeat at Arsenal on 21 August 2010.

Evatt was named in the "Team of the Week" for week fourteen of the campaign, sharing the centre-back role with Aston Villa's Ciaran Clark.

Evatt was Blackpool's only ever-present player in their 38 Premier League matches during the 2010–11 season. This included one substitute appearance against Aston Villa at Villa Park on 10 November 2010.

After the departure of Keith Southern to Huddersfield Town in July 2012, Evatt inherited the accolade of being Blackpool's longest-serving current player.

=== Return to Chesterfield ===
After his release from Blackpool in June 2013, Evatt re-joined Chesterfield on a two-year contract on 30 July 2013, and was made the club's captain. He scored his first goal in his second spell for the club against Fleetwood Town in the Football League Trophy Northern Area final on 4 February 2014.

He was released by Chesterfield at the end of the 2017–18 season.

== Managerial career ==
=== Caretaker spell at Chesterfield ===
On 23 April 2018, following the departure of Jack Lester, Evatt was appointed caretaker manager for the remainder of the season, which ended in Chesterfield's relegation to the National League.

=== Barrow ===
On 15 June 2018, Evatt was unveiled as the new manager of National League side Barrow.

Evatt officially retired from playing after coming on as a forward late in a friendly at home to his former club Blackpool on 20 July 2019. The appearance was prompted by Barrow's social-media manager, who announced that, should their tweet be retweeted one thousand times, Evatt would come on for the last few minutes.

In his second season in charge, Evatt guided Barrow back to the Football League for the first time in 48 years as champions of the National League. The season was curtailed due to the COVID-19 pandemic, with standings based on a points-per-game basis.

=== Bolton Wanderers ===
On 24 June 2020, Bolton Wanderers made an official approach to Barrow for Evatt to become their head coach, and Barrow demanded £250,000 compensation should he make the move. Two days later, Barrow rejected Bolton's bid for his services, stating it was below the £250,000 they had asked for. On 29 June, Bolton and Barrow agreed on compensation and Bolton began discussing personal terms with Evatt. Evatt's appointment at Bolton was confirmed on 1 July 2020. His first action as Bolton head coach was to give a new contract to recently released Ali Crawford, and his first signing was the leading goalscorer of the 2019–20 EFL League Two season, Eoin Doyle. His first competitive match as head coach came on 5 September, a 2–1 home defeat against Bradford in the first round of the EFL Cup. Evatt lost his first four competitive matches in charge, the first time this has happened to a Bolton manager/head coach. This had Bolton in their lowest-ever league position in their history, 21st in the fourth tier. After losing the first five matches of the season, his first win came on 3 October against Harrogate Town. Bolton's form soon turned around and after winning five matches in a row, Evatt was named EFL League Two Manager of the Month for November 2020. After the departure of director of football Tobias Phoenix on 11 December, Evatt's role was changed from head coach to manager. After five wins and one draw in February 2021, Evatt was named Manager of the Month again for the second time that season. This was followed up the following month with five wins and one draw, which saw him win March's Manager of the Month award as well. Bolton finished the season in third place after a 4–1 win against Crawley Town on the final day of the season, which was enough to secure automatic promotion to League One.

On 28 May 2021, Evatt signed a new three-year contract with the club. On 14 November 2021, during a charity match in which the Bolton first-team played a match against a team of Bolton legends—the match helping to raise money for the mother of Bolton player Gethin Jones, who had been diagnosed with motor neuron disease—substitute Evatt brought himself on after half-time and played as a striker for the first-team. The first-team won 7–4, with Evatt scoring a hat-trick. In Bolton's first season back in League One, Evatt led them to a ninth-placed finish with 73 points.

On 2 February 2023, it was revealed that Evatt had been given shares in Football Ventures (Whites) Ltd, the company that own Bolton Wanderers, making him one of minority owners of the club itself. On 2 April 2023, Evatt managed Bolton to 4–0 win against Plymouth Argyle in the 2023 EFL Trophy final. A month later, he signed a new three-year contract. His third season in charge saw Bolton qualify for the play-offs. They were defeated by Barnsley 2-1 on aggregate in the semi-finals.

After four league wins in October 2023, Evatt was named EFL League One Manager of the Month. This was followed up with three league wins—one of which was a 7–0 win against Exeter City—and a draw in November to win the award for a second-consecutive month. Bolton missed out on automatic promotion at the end of the season, finishing third. In the play-off final, Bolton lost 2–0 to Oxford United.

On 22 January 2025, the club announced that Evatt had left the club by mutual consent following a string of poor results, with Bolton ninth in the table.

After leaving Bolton, Evatt worked for various clubs as a loan adviser, with multiple clubs wanting his advice after he helped to develop loan players such as James Trafford and Conor Bradley during his time at Bolton. By January 2026, he no longer held any shares in the club.

=== Blackpool ===
On 21 October 2025, twelve years after leaving Blackpool as a player, Evatt returned to Bloomfield Road as head coach on a three-year contract. On 19 November 2026, his 45th birthday, Evatt was sacked as Blackpool head coach following a run of three wins in their opening 13 league games which left the club 20th in the League One table.

== Managerial style ==
Evatt prefers to play attacking possession-based football, with his Barrow team nicknamed "Barrowcelona" due to the attacking football they played. At Barrow he played a 3-4-1-2 formation and used the same system at Bolton Wanderers. He changed to a 4-2-3-1 formation, with Bolton going from 20th to third and achieving promotion to League One. Evatt frequently decides against naming a substitute goalkeeper on the bench, preferring to have more attacking options and has had outfield players do goalkeeping training, just in case. Evatt will sometimes bring on attacking players when winning matches rather than defensive players, preferring to score more goals than defend a lead.

== Playing statistics ==
Appearances and goals by club, season and competition
Club	Season	League			FA Cup		League Cup		Other		Total	
Club	Season	Division	Apps	Goals	Apps	Goals	Apps	Goals	Apps	Goals	Apps	Goals
Derby County	2000–01	Premier League	1	0	0	0	0	0	–		1	0
Derby County	2001–02	Premier League	3	0	–		–		–		3	0
Derby County	2002–03	First Division	30	0	1	0	2	1	0	0	33	1
Derby County	Total		34	0	1	0	2	1	0	0	37	1
Northampton Town (loan)	2001–02	Second Division	11	0	–		2	0	0	0	13	0
Chesterfield	2003–04	Second Division	43	5	1	1	1	0	2	0	47	6
Chesterfield	2004–05	Second Division	41	4	1	0	1	0	0	0	43	4
Chesterfield	Total		84	9	2	1	2	0	2	0	90	10
Queens Park Rangers	2005–06	Championship	27	0			1	0	0	0	28	0
Blackpool	2006–07	League One	44	0	5	1	1	0	4 (Note: 3 Appearances in League One play-offs and 1 appearance in EFL Trophy)	0	54	1
Blackpool	2007–08	Championship	29	0	1	0	2	0	0	0	32	0
Blackpool	2008–09	Championship	33	1	1	0	1	0	0	0	35	1
Blackpool	2009–10	Championship	36	4	1	0	1	0	3 (Note: Appearances in Championship play-offs)	0	41	4
Blackpool	2010–11	Premier League	38	1	0	0	0	0	–		38	1
Blackpool	2011–12	Championship	39	3	0	0	0	0	3	0	42	3
Blackpool	2012–13	Championship	11	0	0	0	1	0	0	0	12	0
Blackpool	Total		230	9	8	1	6	0	10	0	254	10
Chesterfield	2013–14	League Two	34	1	2	0	0	0	6 (Note: Appearances in Football League Trophy)	1	42	2
Chesterfield	2014–15	League One	39	1	1	0	1	0	2	0	43	1
Chesterfield	2015–16	League One	23	1	3	0	1	0	0	0	27	1
Chesterfield	2016–17	League One	31	1	2	0	1	0	5 (Note: Appearances in EFL Trophy)	0	39	1
Chesterfield	2017–18	League Two	21	0	1	0	0	0	2	0	24	0
Chesterfield	Total		148	4	9	0	3	0	15	1	175	5
Career total			534	22	20	2	16	1	23	1	594	26

== Managerial statistics ==
As of match played 14 November 2026

Managerial record by team and tenure
Team	From	To	Record					Ref.
Team	From	To	P	W	D	L	Win %	Ref.
Chesterfield (caretaker)	23 April 2018	15 May 2018	3	1	0	2	33.3	
Barrow	15 June 2018	1 July 2020	90	40	21	29	44.4	
Bolton Wanderers	1 July 2020	22 January 2025	261	130	58	73	49.8	
Blackpool	21 October 2025	19 November 2026	57	23	10	24	40.4	
Total			411	194	89	128	47.2	

== Honours ==
=== Player ===
Blackpool

- Football League Championship play-offs: 2010
- Football League One play-offs: 2007

Chesterfield

- Football League Two: 2013–14
- Football League Trophy runner-up: 2013–14

Individual

- Blackpool Player of the Season: 2010–11
- PFA Team of the Year: 2013–14 League Two

=== Manager ===
Barrow

- National League: 2019–20

Bolton Wanderers

- EFL League Two third-place promotion: 2020–21
- EFL Trophy: 2022–23

Individual

- National League Manager of the Month: December 2018
- National League Manager of the Year: 2019–20
- EFL League Two Manager of the Month: November 2020, February 2021, March 2021
- EFL League One Manager of the Month: October 2023, November 2023
