= Rhys Evans =

English footballer and coach

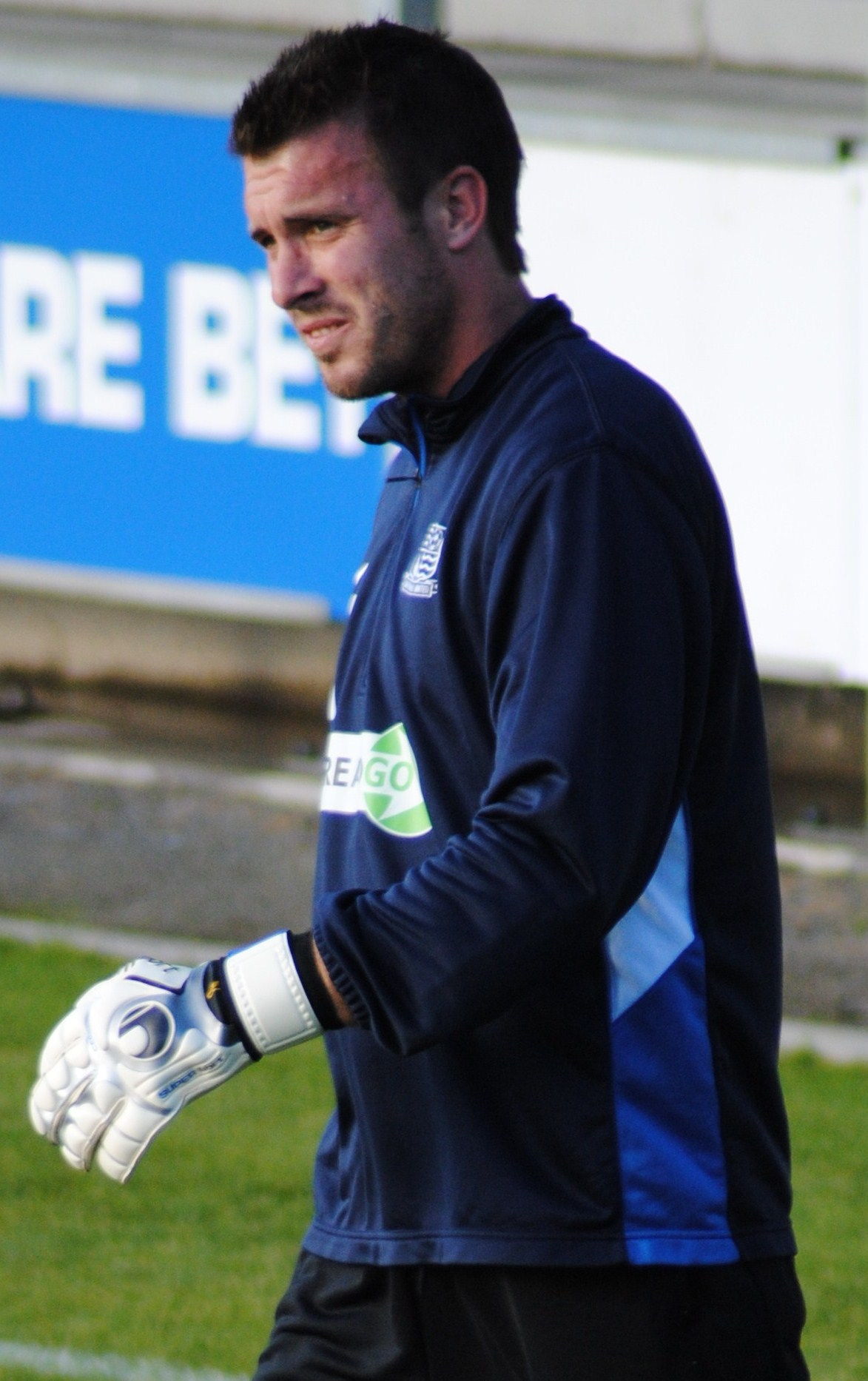
- Evans warming up for Southend United in 2010

Personal information
- Full name: Rhys Karl Evans
- Date of birth: 27 January 1982 (age 44)
- Place of birth: Swindon, England
- Position: Goalkeeper

Senior career*
Years	Team	Apps	(Gls)
1998–2003	Chelsea	0	(0)
2000	→ Bristol Rovers (loan)	4	(0)
2001–2002	→ Queens Park Rangers (loan)	11	(0)
2002	→ Leyton Orient (loan)	7	(0)
2003–2006	Swindon Town	118	(0)
2006–2008	Blackpool	32	(0)
2007	→ Bradford City (loan)	4	(0)
2008	Millwall	21	(0)
2008–2009	Bradford City	45	(0)
2009–2010	Bristol Rovers	3	(0)
2010–2011	Southend United	13	(0)
2011–2012	Staines Town	11	(0)
2012–2013	Exeter City	5	(0)
2013–2014	Hereford United	20	(0)
2017–2018	Wimborne Town	1	(0)
2018	Hereford	0	(0)
2019	Royal Wootton Bassett Town		
Total		295	(0)

International career
2003	England U21	2	(0)

Managerial career
- 2015–2018: Hereford (goalkeeping coach)
- 2019–2020: Swindon Supermarine (goalkeeping coach)
- 2020: Barnet (goalkeeping coach)
- * Club domestic league appearances and goals

Rhys Karl Evans (born 27 January 1982) is an English former professional footballer and goalkeeper coach. He played as a goalkeeper, who won two England under-21 caps.

Born in Swindon, Wiltshire, he began his career with Chelsea, where he stayed five years without playing a game, but had loan spells at three other clubs. In 2003, he moved to his hometown club Swindon Town, where he ended up playing more than 100 games in three seasons. In his final season at Swindon, he won all the club's player of the season awards, but following their relegation to Football League Two, he turned down a new contract offer and instead signed for Blackpool. However, he fell out of favour after less than a year with Blackpool, and initially moved to Bradford City on loan, before he returned to London, with Millwall on a short-term contract. After his contract was not extended, he returned to Bradford City. Despite keeping 17 clean sheets, he left at the end of his first season and moved on to Bristol Rovers and Southend United.

== Club career ==
=== Chelsea ===
Evans started his career in 1998 at Chelsea, with whom he stayed until he was released 2003, having never played a single game. During his time at the club he was sent out on loan to Bristol Rovers in February 2000, with whom he played four games; Queens Park Rangers from November 2001 to April 2002, making eleven appearances; and Leyton Orient from August to November 2002, playing seven games. He also had a spell on trial with AFC Bournemouth before the start of the 2002–03 season, where he impressed, but instead opted to join Leyton Orient.

=== Swindon Town ===
In August 2003, Evans attracted interest from another Premier League club Bolton Wanderers, but instead joined his local club, Swindon Town, on a free transfer. He made his debut for the club on 12 August 2003, in a League Cup match at Southend United, which Swindon won 3–2. His league debut came on 30 August 2003, in a 2–2 draw against Blackpool. He remained the club's first-choice goalkeeper for the rest of the 2003–04 season, missing just one match with a back injury. The following season, 2004–05, Evans remained the club's first-choice goalkeeper until April 2005 when he was dropped for the first time after a match against Luton Town, although he was installed back in the team after just one match out. With his contract running out at the end of the season he turned down a move to Leeds United and instead signed a one-year contract extension with Swindon.

The 2005–06 season began for Evans with a knee injury, when he was forced to play early matches in pain as the club had no back-up goalkeeper available. When Swindon signed Tom Heaton on loan from Manchester United until 2 January 2006, it allowed Evans to have exploratory surgery on the knee. He also spent time at Lilleshall rehabilitation centre before his comeback to the first team in late 2005, when he again established himself. The season ended in relegation for Swindon Town to Football League Two, and Evans won a clean sweep of all the club's "player of the season" awards.

=== Blackpool ===
With his contract again up at the end of the season, new Swindon manager Dennis Wise, offered Evans a one-year contract, which Evans turned down as he wished to play at a higher level than League Two. On 1 July 2006, he signed a two-year contract with Blackpool on a free transfer.

Evans made 39 consecutive appearances in the 2006–07 league season. On 27 February 2006, he was dropped by Blackpool manager Simon Grayson in favour of then on-loan Paul Rachubka for a match at Oldham Athletic, in which Rachubka kept a clean sheet in a 1–0 win. In April 2007, Evans picked up a hernia injury that required surgery. This kept him out of the side until May. Both the on-loan Rachubka and Blackpool's third-choice keeper, Lewis Edge, also suffered concurrent injuries, which led to Blackpool bringing in Manchester City's Joe Hart on loan as an emergency stand-in.

Following promotion to the Football League championship, Rachubka, who by then had signed permanently for the club, remained the first-choice goalkeeper. Evans's only appearances in the first part of the 2007–08 season came in the League Cup against Premier League club Derby County on 28 August 2007, which Blackpool won on penalties after the game ended 2–2 in extra time, and then in the next round of the same competition against Southend United which Blackpool won 2–1 after extra time.

On 5 October 2007, Blackpool sent Evans on a month's loan to League Two club Bradford City in order to help him resurrect his career. He made his debut for Bradford against Milton Keynes Dons, his first start in the league since February. However, after just four games, he returned to Blackpool following an injury to his left shoulder, sustained in a 1–1 draw with Grimsby Town on 27 October 2007. While he was at Bradford, Evans had created controversy after publicly criticising the Blackpool fans in an interview with the Telegraph & Argus. He was warned by Blackpool manager Simon Grayson that he would have to accept "whatever comes his way" when he returned to Blackpool.

=== Millwall ===
On 22 January 2008, Evans signed for Millwall on a free transfer until the end of the 2007–08 season. He conceded two late goals on his Millwall debut as they lost a two-goal lead to draw 2–2 with Nottingham Forest. Evans played 21 league games and one FA Cup game for Millwall during the season, and although Millwall eventually avoided relegation, manager Kenny Jackett decided not to extend Evans's contract beyond the 2007–08 season.

=== Bradford City ===
In July 2008, he was given another chance to shine at Bradford City when he was offered a trial by manager Stuart McCall. He played several pre-season friendlies, before he signed a one-year contract on 1 August 2008 ahead of the 2008–09 season. Evans made his debut in the opening game of the season as City won 2–1 against Notts County when he pulled off a number of saves to ensure victory. He was a regular in the City side ahead of understudy Jonathan McLaughlin and earned praise from his manager McCall for one save against Rotherham United, which earned comparison to one made by former England international David Seaman. At the turn of the year, Evans kept four consecutive clean sheets—one short of a club record—before he conceded a deflected free-kick against Accrington Stanley. The run of form prompted Evans to seek a longer contract with the club. The 2008–09 season also saw Evans break his personal record for clean sheets in a season. Evans was an ever-present in the City team during league and cup and was expected to miss his first game in February after he injured his thigh in a game against Darlington. However, after reserve keeper Jonathan McLaughlin suffered concussion in a reserve game, Evans continued to play with a thigh strain. He was released from his contract on 6 May 2009 after the club had to lower the wage budget

=== Bristol Rovers ===
Evans had a trial with Bristol Rovers, eventually signing a short-term contract. This is his second spell at Rovers, having featured in 2000 on loan from Chelsea. He made his second debut against Aldershot Town in the first round of the League Cup. He let in one from a penalty, although he also made several vital saves to secure Rovers' passage through. He played because Steve Phillips was in Turkey discussing a move there but rejected a contract and Newcastle would not let Fraser Forster play as he is on loan from the Magpies. He also played in the following round's tie at Cardiff City, as Forster was cup-tied and Steve Phillips has been put on the transfer list, a 2–1 league defeat at Wycombe and a JPT defeat at Hereford.

On the 2009 transfer deadline day, he signed a new one-year deal,

Evans made eight appearances in total for Rovers, including four cup outings, before being released along with 14 other players at the end of the 2009/10 season.

=== Southend United ===
On 22 July 2010, Evans signed a one-year contract with Southend United. At the start of the season, Evans found himself second choice behind Glenn Morris. He made his debut in the Football League Trophy game against Gillingham on 31 August 2010. Evans had to wait until 1 January 2011, to make his league debut for the club in a 2–0 victory over Oxford United.

Evans was told that he would not receive a further deal at Southend in May 2011, one of five players to be released by the club.

=== Staines Town ===
Evans spent part of the 2011–12 campaign following his release training with Conference National side Forest Green Rovers. He then joined Conference South outfit Staines Town and remained at the club until the end of the 2011–12 season.

=== Exeter City ===
On 18 June 2012, Exeter City announced Evans had signed for the club on a one-year contract. On 30 April 2013, he was released by the Exeter due to the expiry of his contract.

=== Hereford United ===
Evans agreed to join Hereford United on 1 August 2013 following a successful trial.

=== Coaching career ===
On 21 May 2015, The Hereford Times reported that Evans had agreed to join Hereford as a coach, taking coaching sessions once a week. During his time with the Bulls he played for Wimborne Town alongside his coaching responsibilities. Evans was registered as a player at Edgar Street in March 2018. He left the club in October 2018, shortly after the departure of Peter Beadle.

In February 2019, Evans signed for Hellenic Football League side Royal Wootton Bassett Town. In June 2019, he joined Swindon Supermarine as goalkeeping coach. He has also coached at Salisbury.

On 1 October 2020, Evans joined Barnet as goalkeeping coach, once again linking up with Peter Beadle and Steve Jenkins. He left in December 2020 following Beadle's departure.

== International career ==
Evans represented England at Under 18 and Under 20 level, before he made his debut for the England Under 21 team in 2003 against Serbia and Montenegro but was stretchered off with a back injury to be replaced by Stephen Bywater. In September 2003, he declined a second chance to play for the Under 21s preferring to work on establishing himself as Swindon Town first-choice goalkeeper.

== Honours ==
Blackpool

- League One play-off final winner: 2006–07
