= Lewis Edge =

English footballer (born 1987)

Personal information
- Full name: Lewis John Spencer Edge
- Date of birth: 12 January 1987 (age 39)
- Place of birth: Lancaster, England
- Position: Goalkeeper

Youth career
- Dolphinholme

Senior career*
| Years | Team | Apps | (Gls) |
| 2003–2008 | Blackpool | 11 | (0) |
| 2006 | → Worksop Town (loan) | 1 | (0) |
| 2006 | → Rochdale (loan) | 5 | (0) |
| 2006 | → Bury (loan) | 5 | (0) |
| 2007 | → Rochdale (loan) | 3 | (0) |
| 2008 | → Northwich Victoria | 4 | (0) |
| 2008–2009 | Morecambe | 0 | (0) |
| 2009–2012 | AFC Fylde | 109 | (0) |
- * Club domestic league appearances and goals

Lewis John Spencer Edge (born 12 January 1987) is an English professional footballer who last played as a goalkeeper for AFC Fylde in the NPL Division One North league.

== Cricket ==
Prior to his football career, Edge played cricket for Morecambe Cricket Club. After numerous match-saving performances, he was recruited by Cumberland County Cricket Club, and played a part in their victory over Lancashire County Cricket Club. Edge was awarded the man-of-the-match award in the victory over Lancashire. Before joining the world of football, Edge was rated as one of the best young wicket keepers/batsmen in the country.

His father, David Edge, was a wicket keeper/batsman and goalkeeper.

== Football career ==
=== Blackpool ===
When he made his debut as a 16-year-old for Blackpool's reserve team on 21 August 2003, he was still playing cricket for Morecambe, and he made his first-team debut for Blackpool on 8 May 2004, whilst still a member of Blackpool's youth team, against Bristol City. Although Blackpool lost the match, Edge denied Lee Peacock three times and he won the man-of-the-match award. Since then, Edge has had to wait in the reserve team, with the odd appearance for the first team. On 18 January 2005, Edge, who was still a member of the club's youth team, made his debut in the FA Cup against Leicester City when Brad Jones, on loan from Middlesbrough, was cup-tied and both Kevin Stuhr Ellegaard and Lee Jones were unfit. It was also his first appearance for the first team at Bloomfield Road.

On 17 February 2006, Edge went on loan to Conference North club, Worksop Town, on work experience with his due to continue training with Blackpool but play for Worksop. However, after just one match he returned to Blackpool on 22 February after Worksop received clearance for Andy Jeffery to play.

In March 2006 Edge received his first professional contract when he was one of four youth-squad players offered one-year contracts with an option for a further year. He went on loan to Rochdale in July 2006, initially until January 2007, but he was recalled on 18 August after an injury to Blackpool's Lee Jones. He also had a short loan spell at Bury whom he signed for on loan on 14 October 2006. He was recalled after just over two weeks, on 31 October.

He then returned on loan to Rochdale on 31 January 2007, until the end of the season, but he was recalled again on 29 March.

In April 2007, Edge suffered ligament damage that prevented him from getting some first-team games under his belt after concurrent injuries to Blackpool's other goalkeepers, Rhys Evans and then on-loan Paul Rachubka. Blackpool manager Simon Grayson brought in Manchester City's Joe Hart on loan as an emergency stand-in. On 29 May he received the club's "Young Player of the Year" award at Blackpool's annual presentation night held at Bloomfield Road. On 25 January 2008, he signed a one-month loan deal with Conference National club Northwich Victoria. On 7 May he was released by Blackpool.

=== Morecambe ===
On 21 October 2008 Edge signed for League Two club Morecambe on a two-month contract, joining his father at the club. He was an unused substitute later that day as the Shrimps lost 3–1 to Brentford at Griffin Park.

=== AFC Fylde ===
Edge was released by Morecambe in May 2009 and signed for AFC Fylde in the NPL Division One North league in October 2009.

== Honours ==
Blackpool

- League One play-off final winner: 2006–07
