= Keigan Parker =

Scottish footballer

Personal information
- Full name: Keigan Parker
- Date of birth: 8 June 1982 (age 44)
- Place of birth: Livingston, Scotland
- Position: Forward

Team information
- Current team: Thorniewood United

Youth career
- Hutchison Vale Boys Club

Senior career*
Years	Team	Apps	(Gls)
1998–2004	St Johnstone	101	(20)
2004–2008	Blackpool	141	(34)
2008–2009	Huddersfield Town	20	(2)
2009	→ Hartlepool United (loan)	9	(0)
2009–2010	Oldham Athletic	27	(2)
2010	→ Bury (loan)	2	(0)
2010–2011	Mansfield Town	20	(5)
2011	→ Fleetwood Town (loan)	13	(2)
2011	Stockport County	1	(0)
2011	A.F.C. Blackpool	0	(0)
2011–2012	AFC Fylde	28	(13)
2012	Ayr United	16	(5)
2012	Cork City	9	(2)
2012–2013	Irvine Meadow		
2013	Shettleston	1	(0)
2014–2015	Airdrieonians	35	(6)
2015	Clyde	10	(1)
2016	Wyre Villa	12	(5)
2017	Thorniewood United	1	(0)

International career^{‡}
2001	Scotland U21	1	(0)
- * Club domestic league appearances and goals as of 22:00, 5 May 2015 (UTC) ‡ National team caps and goals as of 31 October 2012

Keigan Parker (born 8 June 1982) is a Scottish former footballer who played as a forward.

He began his career with St Johnstone in 1998, making over 100 league appearances for the club. In 2004, he joined Blackpool, where he spent four years, winning the 2006–07 League One play-off final. He went on to play have short spells at several clubs, including Huddersfield Town, Oldham Athletic, Mansfield Town and AFC Fylde. He retired from playing in 2017, after a season with Thorniewood United.

Parker received one international cap, for Scotland's under-21 team in 2001.

== Early life ==
Born in Livingston, West Lothian, Parker attended Boghall Primary School. His father helped out with the training for the school's football team, and Parker undertook extra training to improve his basic skills.

== Career ==
Parker was a "relatively late starter" in the game, beginning at around the age of 14. A year or so later, he began playing for Muirieston United in Livingston. He then joined Hutchison Vale Boys Club.

=== St Johnstone ===
Parker, a striker, began his career at age 15 with Scottish club St Johnstone, then managed by Paul Sturrock, where he made a promising start to his career (making his debut against Motherwell aged 16). Sturrock moved on to Dundee United, and was replaced as manager by Sandy Clark. Both Parker and Clark lived in Bathgate, and Clark occasionally gave Parker, then at Youth Training Scheme (YTS) level, a ride into training.

While at St Johnstone, Parker gained one cap for the Scotland U-21 team. Unable to impress enough at McDiarmid Park, and after being out for six months with a foot injury, in 2004, after six years in Perth, he joined Blackpool on a free transfer.

=== Blackpool ===
Parker was the first signing made by then Blackpool manager Colin Hendry in June 2004. He made his début for the club on 7 August 2004 as a substitute in a 2–0 defeat at Doncaster Rovers and made his starting début three days later in a 2–1 defeat at home to Sheffield Wednesday. His first goal came on 29 September in a 2–0 win over York City. In December 2004, he scored a second-half hat-trick at Bloomfield Road against Torquay United.

With Blackpool, Parker found some consistency while the club were in League One but failed to hold down a place in the side when they were promoted to The Championship in the 2007–08 season. He made his 100th league appearance for Blackpool on 30 December 2006, in a 3–1 win over Doncaster Rovers at Bloomfield Road.

On 27 May 2007, Parker scored Blackpool's second goal in their 2–0 win against Yeovil Town in the League One play-off final at Wembley, a result that promoted Blackpool to The Championship. "It's the best day of my career," he said afterwards. "I've scored against Celtic and Rangers before, but to win at Wembley is something I'll treasure for the rest of my life." It was also his last goal for the club.

Parker finished the 2006–07 season as the club's second-top scorer with sixteen goals in all competitions. He failed to secure a regular place in the starting line-up in the 2007–08 season and in the January 2008 transfer window, he rejected a move to Barnsley. His last appearance for the club came on 15 March 2008 against local rivals Preston North End and on 7 May, he was released by Blackpool. He had not featured in the first team during the final two months of the 2007–08 season and had made just 17 appearances for the club throughout the season, failing to score a goal. "The last three months have been a bit of a nightmare," he explained at the time. "I've had four great years and last season was fantastic, especially at Wembley, but I'll be moving on in the summer." On 15 May 2008, Parker stated that he was not released by Blackpool, that he had turned down the offer of a new contract earlier in the season and had then allowed his existing deal to run out after being offered only around £500 a week more than his existing contract. He was linked with moves to Huddersfield Town, Swansea City, Scottish Premier League club Aberdeen and Southampton, with Parker saying, "There are five or six clubs who are interested. It depends on a few issues but I should know more in the next couple of weeks." A planned move to Nottingham Forest, with Grant Holt moving the other way, fell through because Karl Oyston demanded a £300,000 transfer fee.

=== English career after leaving Blackpool ===
On 27 May 2008, Parker agreed to join Huddersfield Town on a two-year contract, subject to a medical. His first appearance for Town came in their 4–0 win against Bradford City on 12 August 2008, when he played the final ten minutes of the match. His first league appearance was again as a substitute in a 3–1 defeat to Milton Keynes Dons on 23 August. His first league goal came on 1 November, to give Huddersfield a 3–2 victory over Crewe Alexandra at the Galpharm Stadium. He was sent off in added time for two yellow cards. His first away goal for the club came in the 4–2 defeat by Leicester City on 24 January 2009.

On 2 March 2009, Parker joined fellow Football League One side Hartlepool United on loan after being locked out of the Town side by new loan signing Lukas Jutkiewicz and Danny Cadamarteri amongst others. He made his debut the following day in the 2–1 win against Tranmere Rovers at Victoria Park but failed to score in nine starts and returned to Huddersfield.

On 21 July 2009, Parker agreed a one-year deal at Oldham Athletic, which was completed the following day. On 18 March 2010, Parker was loaned for a month-long to Football League Two club Bury. After returning to Oldham Athletic after his loan spell, Parker was released from his contract in line with close-season streamlining at the club.

After being released by Oldham Athletic, Parker signed for Mansfield Town on 20 July 2010 and was unveiled to the Mansfield fans before their pre-season friendly match against local rivals Nottingham Forest. He then went on loan to Fleetwood Town and scored on his debut against Grimsby Town.

In August 2011, he joined Stockport County but was released on 25 August. Following his release from Stockport, Parker joined North West Counties League Premier Division club AFC Blackpool in September 2011. Parker joined Northern Premier League Division One North club AFC Fylde in September 2011 just days after signing for AFC Blackpool, scoring 13 goals in 28 games for the Coasters.

=== Ayr United ===
On 1 February 2012, Parker joined Scottish First Division side Ayr United on a free transfer from Fylde. Parker made his début for Ayr United on 11 February 2012 in a Scottish First Division match against Queen of the South. Parker scored his first goal for the Honest Men against Partick Thistle at Firhill, United lost 4–2. On 28 April, Parker scored two goals in a 3–2 victory for Ayr over high-flying Dundee. His second goal of that game, an overhead kick, was voted goal of the season across the three divisions of the SFL.

=== Cork City ===
Parker signed for Cork City in July 2012. He made his League of Ireland home debut against Shelbourne on 27 July 2012, coming on as a 70th-minute substitute, only to get a straight red card 15 minutes later.

=== Later career ===
Parker signed for Junior side Irvine Meadow in late October 2012 and was released on 28 February 2013. Parker then signed for Junior side Shettleston on 1 March 2013. Parker signed for Airdrie on 2 January 2014 after appearing as a trialist and scoring the winning goal against Arbroath. He was released by the club in February 2015.

On 2 February 2015, Parker signed for Clyde on a six-month contract, after being released by Airdrieonians earlier the same day. Parker made his debut alongside Scott McLaughlin in a 2–0 win over Albion Rovers at Cliftonhill assisting the second goal. Parker was released from Clyde in May 2015 after failing to earn a new contract.

Parker signed for West Lancashire League club Wyre Villa in 2016. He scored two goals on his debut, a 4–1 win over Dalton United. On 19 January 2017, Parker signed for Scottish Junior Club Thorniewood United until the end of the season.

As of April 2021, he had also been working in sales for several years.

== Coaching career ==
In October 2024, Parker began a coaching role at West Calder United.

== Honours ==
Blackpool

- Football League One play-offs: 2007
