= Shaun Barker =

English footballer

Personal information
- Full name: Shaun Barker
- Date of birth: 19 September 1982 (age 44)
- Place of birth: Trowell, England
- Position: Defender

Youth career
- ?–2000: Rotherham United

Senior career*
Years	Team	Apps	(Gls)
2000–2006	Rotherham United	123	(7)
2006–2009	Blackpool	134	(5)
2009–2015	Derby County	98	(6)
2016–2018	Burton Albion	6	(0)
Total		361	(18)
- * Club domestic league appearances and goals

Shaun Barker (born 19 September 1982) is an English former professional footballer who played as a defender.

== Career ==
=== Rotherham United ===
Born in Trowell, Nottinghamshire, Barker started his career at Rotherham as a junior making his debut in March 2003 against Brighton & Hove Albion. On 7 May 2003 he was named as the club's "Young Player of the Year". In July 2003 he signed a two-year extension to his contract, keeping him at the club until the end of the 2005–06 season. He went on to make 132 appearances in total for The Millers. In the 2005–06 season he topped the club's appearance list with 42 league games and one as a substitute. On 7 February 2006 he was named in the Football League's "Team of the Week" for League One following his performance in a match against Hartlepool United on 4 February.

=== Blackpool ===
Barker joined Blackpool on 2 August 2006 on a free transfer, after turning down two offers of a new contract from Rotherham. He signed a two-year contract with an option for a further year. Although he was signed originally as a centre-half, he was used as a right-back.

His first goal for Blackpool was a last-minute winner against Dario Gradi's Crewe Alexandra on 21 October 2006, ten minutes after The Seasiders had been reduced to ten men through Simon Gillett's dismissal. He captained the side for the first time on 6 March 2007, in a 2–0 home win against AFC Bournemouth. Barker was one of two ever-present players during Blackpool's 2007–08 league season, the other being Paul Rachubka. He was also the vice-captain for the season.

For the 2008–09 season, Rob Edwards was named as the "on-field" captain, with Barker as vice-captain and club captain. On 1 September 2008, Barker was named in the Press Association's Championship "Team of the Week" following his performance in the club's match at Southampton on 30 August. On 18 October 2008 he made his 100th league appearance for The Seasiders, in their 0–0 draw against Doncaster Rovers at the Keepmoat Stadium.

In the second half of the 2008–09 season, when Tony Parkes took over as caretaker manager, Barker was moved to his usual centre-back role and cemented his place in that position. His performances led to his being linked with a move to Derby County, which Blackpool chairman Karl Oyston angrily dismissed, saying that "we've not had an offer from Derby... so unless anything changes drastically between now and August then he [Barker] will be starting here next season". It was later revealed that Derby had submitted a formal bid for Barker, believed to be in the region of £400,000, which was rejected.

=== Derby County ===
Barker joined Derby County on 15 July 2009, for an undisclosed fee, believed to be around £900,000, signing a three-year contract. Barker made his Derby début as an 89th-minute substitute in a 3–2 defeat to Scunthorpe United on 15 August, his start to the season being delayed by a slight hamstring strain. He made his first start for Derby in a 1–0 defeat to Sheffield United on 12 September, going on to make thirteen consecutive appearances and scoring his first goal for the club in a 3–2 defeat to Barnsley on 15 September. However, having been playing through a thigh injury, a scan after Derby's 2–1 win over Reading on 28 November revealed that the tear in his thigh muscle had gotten worse, ruling him out for several weeks. Barker made his return from injury with a substitute appearance in Derby's FA Cup win over Millwall on 12 January 2010 and started the next game, a 3–0 win over Peterborough on 16 January. From this point Barker shrugged off the injury problems that had curtailed the earlier part of his season and finished the season with a run of 23 consecutive appearances, scoring twice (the third in a 3–0 win over Newcastle United and the equaliser in a 1–1 draw away to Q.P.R.) to take his tally for the season to five. Barker enjoyed a successful first season with Derby and, although the side struggled in the league, only achieving safety in the 44th fixture, he was awarded The Jack Stamps Trophy before the final game of the season against Cardiff City, his second successive Player of the Year award after winning Blackpool's 2008/09 award. Whilst Derby finished midtable in 2009/10, Barker's former club Blackpool earned promotion to the Premier League leading some observers to suggest he might regret the decision to move to a supposed bigger club. Of this Barker said,

"I'd make the same choice. It's funny how things work out. Obviously I made the move with a long-term view to getting in the Premier League. I looked at the reality, everything was right. A bigger club, more money – and I don't care what some say, that's a big thing. I had an offer to improve my life, move back to my family and do the right thing for my two-year-old daughter. People go on about how much footballers earn but it's a short career and outside the top level you need to be careful and do right for your family. I was looking at one day playing in the Premier League and everything at Derby seemed right. "I was delighted for (Blackpool) but there is bound to be that little thought of 'What if?' What Ian Holloway has done there is beyond comprehension."

Barker was named Derby's Vice Captain ahead of the 2010/11 campaign and started the season as first choice centrehalf alongside Dean Leacock. His first goal of the season came in the ninth match, as he netted a crucial equaliser against Middlesbrough in first half stoppage time that spurred The Rams onto a 3–1 win. On 14 December 2010, it was also announced he had signed a new 3 1/2 deal with the club, taking him through until July 2014. Although Derby once again struggled, Barker featured in every game bar one – which he missed due to suspension – throughout the campaign up until safety was assured on Easter Monday 2011. With safety assured, he had surgery on a knee problem which had been an issue throughout most of his two years at Derby and had prevented him from training for the majority of the end of the 2010–11 season.

As a result, Barker missed the first 16 games of the following season, returning to action in a reserve fixture against Sheffield United on 15 November 2011. He made his first team return as a late substitute in a 2–0 defeat against Hull City on 19 November 2011, making his first start in a 3–1 defeat at West Ham United on 26 November. Barker retained his place in the side where he partnered Jason Shackell in central defence, starting 21 games together, with Derby winning 8, drawing 4, losing 9 games and conceding 23 goals. On 13 March, in a game against Nottingham Forest Barker was involved in a collision and after a 6-minute break in the game was substituted and rushed off to hospital with a suspected broken leg. A day after the game, Barker was ruled out for the remainder of the season with a dislocated kneecap. However, on 22 March 2012 after further scans in hospital, Barker was facing a 16-month recovery from his injury, (ruling him out of the entire 2012–13 season) after rupturing his medial, anterior cruciate and posterior cruciate ligaments. Barker also had a 3 1/2 hour operation to remove damage to the patellar ligament, Barker will also wear a brace to the first 8 weeks to help protect the dislocated knee. Barker remains optimistic for a full recovery. Surgeon Dr Andrew Williams said in April 2012 that he was happy with the progress Barker had made in his injury recovery after his first check-up, with Barker expected to be in a leg brace and crutches for at least 12 weeks. Barker has also spent 6 hours a day in a Kneehab XP, which Barker calls a "machine of death" the machine helps rebuild quadriceps muscles through set spells of contraction and relaxation. Barker has also spent time in an ice machine.

Because he would miss the 2012–13 season due to his injury, Barker was not given a squad number, with Nigel Clough allocating his no.5 shirt to Jake Buxton. Despite this, Clough stated that Barker will play an "important part" in the season as club captain despite being on the sidelines all season. Clough said; "Shaun is going to be as important as ever; he is a great leader. He will be around the place and it will be a case of us supporting him, then him supporting us as well. We will help get Shaun through the next 12 months or so, but we feel as though he can be a major positive on the first team squad. He won't be moping around, he won't be sulking, he will be his usual positive self around the place and he is good to have around." Clough also said he saw similarities between Barker and club captain Richard Keogh, who joined the club as a replacement for the sold Jason Shackell. Despite this injury, Barker signed a one-year extension to his contract in September 2012, which extended his stay at the club until the summer of 2015. In February 2013. eleven months after his injury, it was reported that Barker had undergone three further operations and his rehab was stepped up by taking part in swimming sessions, Barker stated his relief at being able to exercise and step his recovery outside of Derby's training facility at Moor Farm and was again hopeful for a return to the Derby County team.

Barker was unable to return to fitness from pre-season ahead of the 2013–14 season, with an exact timeframe of a return unsure. Barker didn't make any appearances for Derby during the season, as he continued his rehabilitation work throughout the season, notably in Düsseldorf, Germany and Philadelphia, America. The 2014–15 season, however, began on a far more promising note for Barker. On 14 August 2014, he was able to return to light training with the Derby Under 21 side. On this experience he commented: "I did a full hour session which involved a long warm up, two different 'keep ball' games and finished with a small 8 vs 8 game. To complete that was indescribable. I've had two years and four months of football stolen from my life and finally I got to enjoy 60 minutes of the game I love so much."

In early March 2015, it was reported that Barker was undergoing a trial with former manager Nigel Clough at Sheffield United, having been out of the game for almost three years.

On 6 May 2015, he left Derby County after not being included on the club's retained list for the new season.

=== Burton Albion ===
On 26 August 2016, Barker signed for Championship side Burton Albion, reuniting him with Nigel Clough. He made his debut later that day, coming on as a last minute substitute in Burton's 1–0 win against Barker's former club Derby County, his first competitive game in over four years.

=== Retirement ===
During the 2017–2018 season, Barker made only one appearance for Burton Albion, as a late substitute in a 3–1 win over Derby County on 14 April 2018. He announced his retirement as a player at the end of the season.

== Career statistics ==
Appearances and goals by club, season and competition
Club	Season	League			FA Cup		League Cup		Other^{[A]}		Total	
Club	Season	Division	Apps	Goals	Apps	Goals	Apps	Goals	Apps	Goals	Apps	Goals
Rotherham United	2002–03	First Division	11	0	0	0	0	0	0	0	11	0
Rotherham United	2003–04	First Division	36	2	2	0	3	0	0	0	41	2
Rotherham United	2004–05	Championship	33	2	0	0	1	0	0	0	34	2
Rotherham United	2005–06	League One	43	3	1	0	2	0	1	0	47	3
Rotherham United	Total		123	7	3	0	6	0	1	0	133	7
Blackpool	2006–07	League One	45	3	5	1	1	0	4	2	55	6
Blackpool	2007–08	Championship	46	2	0	0	4	0	0	0	50	2
Blackpool	2008–09	Championship	43	0	1	0	0	0	0	0	44	0
Blackpool	Total		134	5	6	1	5	0	4	2	149	6
Derby County	2009–10	Championship	35	5	3	0	0	0	0	0	38	5
Derby County	2010–11	Championship	43	1	1	0	1	0	0	0	45	1
Derby County	2011–12	Championship	20	0	2	0	0	0	0	0	22	0
Derby County	2012–13	Championship	0	0	0	0	0	0	0	0	0	0
Derby County	2013–14	Championship	0	0	0	0	0	0	0	0	0	0
Derby County	2014–15	Championship	0	0	0	0	0	0	0	0	0	0
Derby County	Total		98	6	6	0	1	0	0	0	105	6
Burton Albion	2016–17	Championship	5	0	0	0	0	0	0	0	5	0
Burton Albion	2017–18	Championship	1	0	0	0	0	0	0	0	1	0
Burton Albion	Total		6	0	0	0	0	0	0	0	6	0
Career total			361	18	15	1	12	0	5	2	393	21

A. The "Other" column constitutes appearances and goals (including those as a substitute) in the Football League Trophy and the play-offs.

== Honours ==
Blackpool

- Football League One play-offs: 2007

Individual

- Rotherham United Young Player of the Year: 2002–03
- Blackpool Player of the Year: 2006–07
- Blackpool Players' Player of the Year: 2006–07
- Derby County Supporters' Player of the Year: 2009–10
