= Robbie Williams (footballer, born 1984) =

English footballer

Personal information
- Full name: Robert Ian Williams
- Date of birth: 2 October 1984 (age 42)
- Place of birth: Pontefract, England
- Height: 5 ft 10 in (1.78 m)
- Position: Centre back

Youth career
- –2002: Barnsley

Senior career*
Years	Team	Apps	(Gls)
2002–2007	Barnsley	66	(4)
2007	→ Blackpool (loan)	9	(4)
2007–2010	Huddersfield Town	77	(4)
2010–2011	Stockport County	22	(1)
2011	Rochdale	9	(0)
2011–2013	Plymouth Argyle	42	(4)
2013–2017	Limerick	100	(11)
2017	Cork City	6	(0)
2018	Galway United	19	(1)
2019	Limerick	26	(0)
- * Club domestic league appearances and goals as of 15 November 2019

Robert Ian Williams (born 2 October 1984) is an English footballer who plays as a left back for Pike Rovers. Born in Pontefract, he has made 225 Football League appearances for Barnsley, Blackpool, Huddersfield Town, Stockport County, Rochdale, Plymouth Argyle, Limerick, Cork City and Galway United.

== Career ==
=== Barnsley ===
Williams came through the youth ranks with Barnsley, playing over fifty first-team games. He made his debut on 5 October 2002, against Brentford. On 22 March 2007, Williams joined Blackpool on loan until the end of the season. He scored on his debut for the Seasiders, in a 3–1 win at Bradford City two days later. Williams scored the first goal in the 2007 Football League One play-off final against Yeovil Town at Wembley Stadium. The goal was part of a 2–0 win for Blackpool and saw them promoted to the Championship.

=== Huddersfield Town ===
He was set to join Huddersfield Town in July 2007 before sustaining a hairline fracture to his shin. The transfer was completed the following month, with Williams signing a three-year contract for an undisclosed fee. He made his debut for the club in December at Leeds United, and scored his first goal against Brighton & Hove Albion in January 2008. He made 28 appearances during his first season with Huddersfield, and 39 in the 2008–09 campaign. The following season, he played in both legs of the League One play-off semi-final defeat to Millwall. Williams was released in the summer of 2010 when his contract expired and spent time on trial at Aberdeen.

=== Stockport County ===
Williams joined Stockport County in August 2010 on non-contract terms. He signed a full-time contract at the end of the month, and scored his first goal for the club against Barnet in October. Williams made 25 appearances for Stockport before leaving for Rochdale in January 2011.

=== Rochdale ===
Having joined Rochdale on a free transfer, Williams made his debut in March against Notts County. He was released at the end of the season after the club decided against offering him a new contract. He made nine appearances for Rochdale.

=== Plymouth Argyle ===
Williams signed a one-year contract with Plymouth Argyle in July 2011. He made his debut in a 1–1 draw at Shrewsbury Town in August, and scored his first goal for the club in a 2–0 win against Macclesfield Town in September. In his first season, Williams made 30 appearances in league and cup competition, scoring two goals. Williams signed a new one-year contract in June 2012, and began the new season with three goals in his first five appearances, against Oxford United, Burnley and Port Vale. A stomach injury he sustained in October kept him out of the team for two months. Williams left the club in January 2013 when his contract was cancelled by mutual consent. In his two seasons with the club, Williams played in 42 league games, made four appearances in cup competitions and scored five goals.

=== Limerick ===
In February 2013, Williams joined League of Ireland Premier Division club Limerick. "We are delighted to get a player of Robbie's talent and experience on board," said manager Stuart Taylor. Ahead of the new season, Williams said that "I'm not really familiar with the standard but the way people are talking it's looking positive."

Williams made more appearances for the Shannonsiders than for any other club.

=== Cork City ===
In July 2017, Williams signed for Cork City.

=== Galway United ===
In January 2018, Williams signed for Galway United in the League of Ireland First Division. Williams said, "It's a new challenge. I've been at Limerick for a good few years and Cork City last year. Shane Keegan rang me a few weeks back and I'm delighted to come down to help and hopefully we can fire the team up to where it belongs." He made his league debut for The Tribesmen in their 4–1 win over Athlone Town on Friday, 23 February.

=== Back to Limerick ===
Williams returned to Limerick FC, this time as a player coach and also a coach for the U19 squad.

== Honours ==
Barnsley

- Football League One play-offs: 2006

Blackpool

- Football League One play-offs: 2007

Limerick

- League of Ireland First Division: 2016
