= Joe Brown (footballer, born 1988) =

English footballer (born 1988)

Personal information
- Full name: Joseph William Brown
- Date of birth: 3 April 1988 (age 38)
- Place of birth: Bradford, England
- Height: 5 ft 10 in (1.78 m)
- Positions: Midfielder; striker

Team information
- Current team: Bradford Park Avenue

Youth career
- 2004–2005: Bradford City

Senior career*
| Years | Team | Apps | (Gls) |
| 2005–2007 | Bradford City | 19 | (1) |
| 2007– | Bradford Park Avenue | 0 | (0) |
- * Club domestic league appearances and goals as of 20:33, 26 August 2007 (UTC)

Joseph William Brown (born 3 April 1988) is an English footballer, who plays for Bradford Park Avenue.

== Career ==
Brown signed for Bradford City as an apprentice in 2004. He made his debut for the Bantams in a Football League Trophy first-round game at Morecambe on 22 November 2005 when he came on as an 82nd-minute substitute. He scored a last-minute winner. In the second round he was again a scoring substitute but Bradford lost 2–1. His league debut came in December in a goalless draw at Scunthorpe United. He scored his one and only league goal for Bradford – again in the 90th minute – after coming on as substitute against Blackpool in March.

The following season, he again scored a Football League Trophy goal. Brown was given a three-match suspension after losing his appeal against a red-card in Bradford's 4–1 loss against Blackpool and was released by City at the end of the 2006–07 season after making just seven appearances.

He went on trial with York City at the end of the 2006–07 season but was deemed "no better than what we have got" by manager Billy McEwan. He later had a trial with Halifax Town and trained with several league clubs, but eventually joined Bradford Park Avenue in August 2007.
