= Paul Rachubka =

English footballer (born 1981)

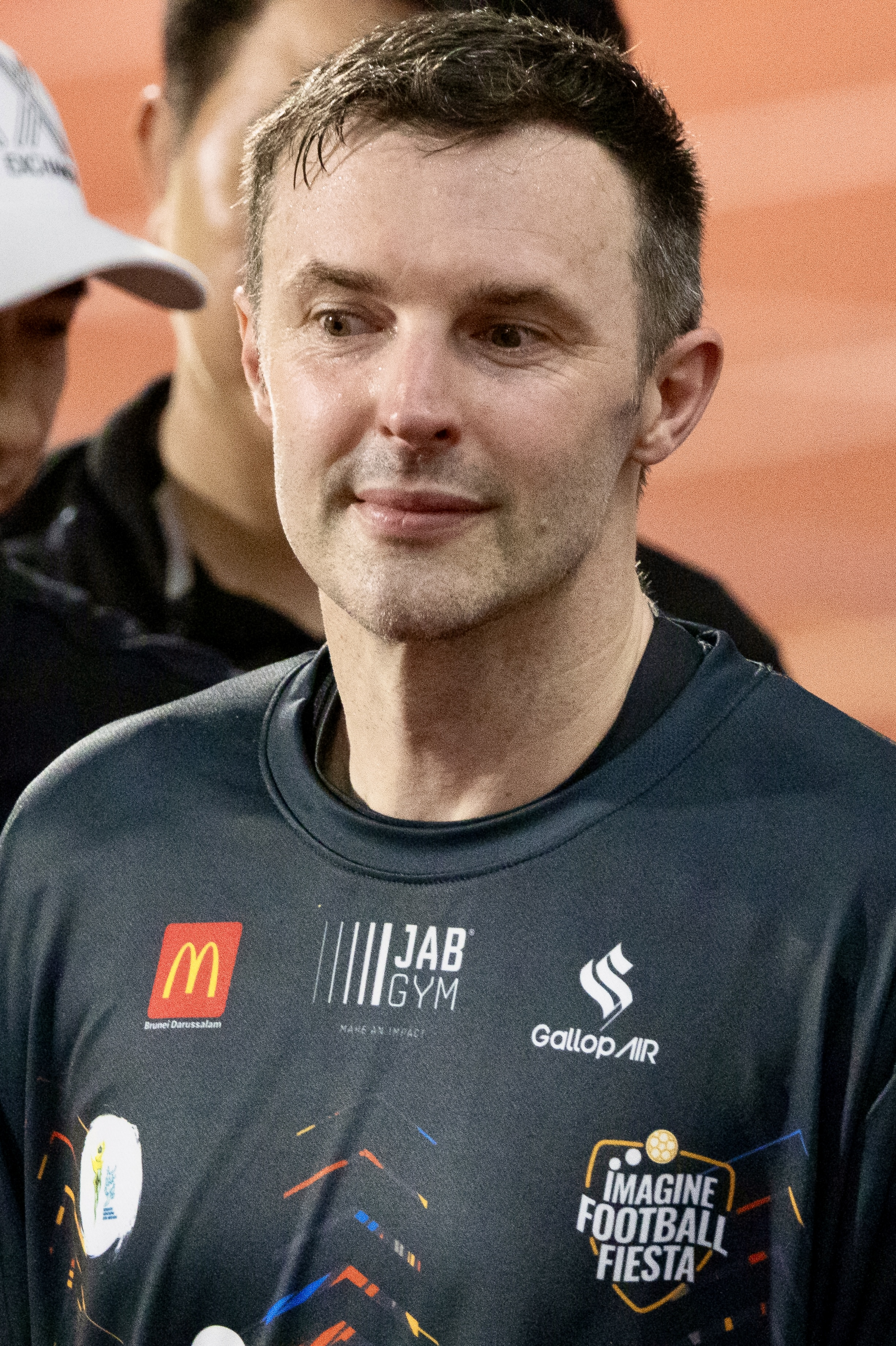
- Rachubka in 2024

Personal information
- Full name: Paul Stephen Rachubka
- Date of birth: 21 May 1981 (age 45)
- Place of birth: San Luis Obispo, California, United States
- Height: 1.85 m (6 ft 1 in)
- Position: Goalkeeper

Youth career
- 1997–2000: Manchester United

Senior career*
Years	Team	Apps	(Gls)
2000–2002	Manchester United	1	(0)
2001	→ Royal Antwerp (loan)	1	(0)
2001–2002	→ Oldham Athletic (loan)	16	(0)
2002–2004	Charlton Athletic	0	(0)
2004	→ Burnley (loan)	0	(0)
2004	→ Huddersfield Town (loan)	16	(0)
2004	→ Milton Keynes Dons (loan)	4	(0)
2004	→ Northampton Town (loan)	10	(0)
2004	→ Huddersfield Town (loan)	3	(0)
2004–2007	Huddersfield Town	62	(0)
2006–2007	→ Peterborough United (loan)	4	(0)
2007	→ Blackpool (loan)	8	(0)
2007–2011	Blackpool	110	(0)
2011–2013	Leeds United	6	(0)
2011–2012	→ Tranmere Rovers (loan)	10	(0)
2012	→ Leyton Orient (loan)	8	(0)
2012	→ Accrington Stanley (loan)	4	(0)
2013	→ Accrington Stanley (loan)	17	(0)
2013–2015	Oldham Athletic	32	(0)
2015	Crewe Alexandra	15	(0)
2015–2016	Bolton Wanderers	7	(0)
2016–2017	Bury	1	(0)
2017–2018	Kerala Blasters	12	(0)
Total		347	(0)

International career
	England U16	?	(?)
	England U18	?	(?)
1999	England U20	1	(0)
- * Club domestic league appearances and goals

Paul Stephen Rachubka (/rəˈhʊpkə/; born 21 May 1981) is a professional footballer who played as a goalkeeper. Born in the United States to an English mother and an American father, Rachubka possesses dual nationality. His family relocated to England when he was seven years old, and represented England at under-16, under-18 and under-20 levels. After leaving football, he started a career as an accountant in Manchester.

== Club career ==
=== Early career at Manchester United and Charlton Athletic ===
Born in the United States, Rachubka grew up in England from the age of seven. He started playing football for a Stockport club called Norbury Moor Rangers. At the age of nine, after three months there, he was invited to join Manchester United by youth coach Brian Kidd. He signed a trainee contract in 1997 before turning professional in July 1999. He was included in the club's squad for the 2000 FIFA Club World Championship in Brazil and made his debut as a substitute in their final group match against South Melbourne on 11 January 2000. He made two more first-team appearances the following season, against Watford in the League Cup and Leicester City in the league. The 2001–02 season saw Rachubka go on a three-month loan to Manchester United's Belgian feeder club Royal Antwerp, followed by six months with Oldham Athletic. At the end of the season, Manchester United received a £200,000 bid for Rachubka from Charlton Athletic, and he left the club without having conceded a goal in any of his three appearances.

After failing to dislodge Dean Kiely in his two years at Charlton, Rachubka was loaned out five times, all in 2004; firstly to Burnley in February, then from March to the end of the 2003–04 season he was at Huddersfield Town. On 6 August, at the start of the 2004–05, he was loaned out to Milton Keynes Dons for one month. He then spent October and November with Northampton Town before returning again to Huddersfield Town, for a further month, on 5 December.

=== Huddersfield Town ===
Rachubka earned promotion with Huddersfield on loan during the 2003–04 season when they won the Division Three playoffs. After his contract expired with Charlton Athletic in 2004, Rachubka took the option to re-sign for Huddersfield Town. He was the first-choice goalkeeper at the Galpharm Stadium until Matt Glennon was signed during the summer of 2006.

Rachubka was sent on loan to Peterborough United as cover for Mark Tyler and played four League Two matches over the Christmas and New Year period of 2006–07.

=== Blackpool ===
In January 2007, Rachubka joined Blackpool on loan. He made his debut for the Seasiders on 27 February and kept a clean sheet in a 1–0 win at his former club Oldham Athletic. On 2 April he was named in the Press Association's League One "Team of the Week", alongside Blackpool teammate Wes Hoolahan, for his performance in the 2–1 win over Crewe Alexandra.

Also in April, Rachubka picked up an injury that kept him out of the team for six weeks. Blackpool's other 'keepers, Rhys Evans and Lewis Edge, also picked up concurrent injuries, which led to Seasiders boss Simon Grayson bringing in Manchester City's Joe Hart on loan as an emergency stand-in.

When Hart returned to Manchester City, Rachubka returned to the Blackpool first team on 13 May 2007, for the first leg of the League One play-off semi-final against Oldham Athletic. Blackpool won both legs, and Rachubka played in the final on 27 May at the newly renovated Wembley Stadium. Blackpool won 2–0 against Yeovil Town, gaining promotion to The Championship.

On 5 June 2007, five days after his contract at Huddersfield expired, Blackpool signed Rachubka on a permanent two-year deal. On 13 August 2007 he was named in The Championship "Team of the Week" for his performance on the opening day of the 2007–08 season, two days before, in the Seasiders' single-goal victory over Leicester City at the Walkers Stadium.

Rachubka was one of two ever-present players during Blackpool's 2007–08 league season, the other being Shaun Barker. In April 2009 Rachubka signed a new two-year deal at Blackpool, before winning the 2008–09 Blackpool Player of the Year award in May.

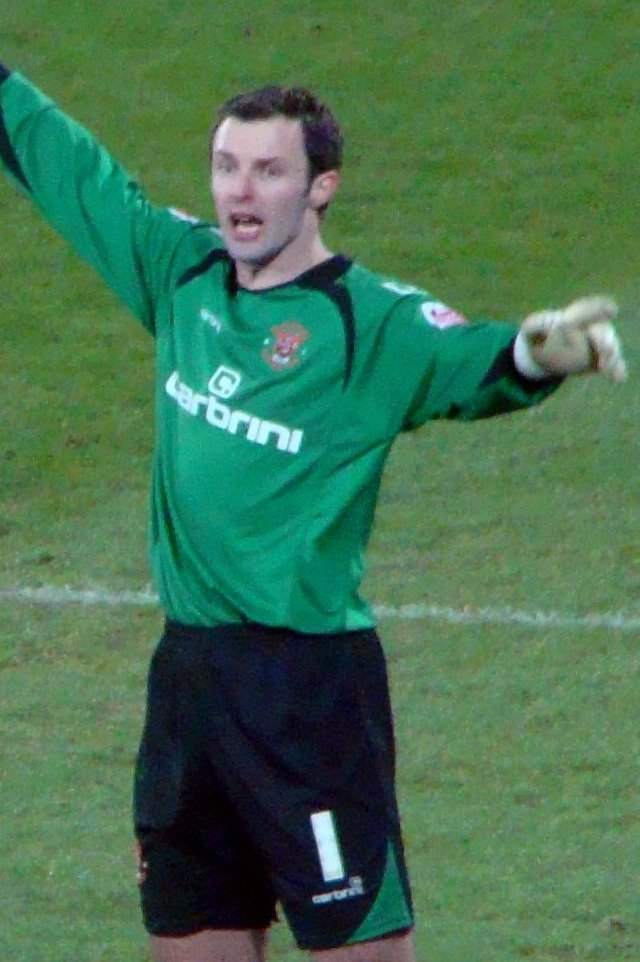
Rachubka playing for Blackpool in 2010

Following his performance in Blackpool's 2–0 win over Peterborough United on 26 September 2009 at Bloomfield Road, Rachubka was named in The Championship "Team of the Week". Rachubka started the season as Blackpool's first choice goalkeeper, however after being sent off in a 4–1 loss against Crystal Palace, substitute goalkeeper Matt Gilks came into the side and managed to displace Rachubka who dropped to second choice due to the impressive form of Gilks. He made 20 league appearances for Blackpool that season as they earned promotion to the Premier League via the playoffs after beating Cardiff City.

After being promoted to the Premier League with Blackpool, Blackpool manager Ian Holloway confirmed that Rachubka would be out of action for some time following a knee operation. As such, he was not named in Blackpool's 24-man squad for the start of their Premier League campaign the following season. Blackpool signed Ghana goalkeeper Richard Kingson who became the club's back-up goalkeeper during Rachubka's time out injured. Even after returning to fitness, he had to wait until January 2011 to be registered in the Blackpool 25-man squad when squads to see clubs through until the end of the season were named. Ian Holloway said it was an error not to have named Rachubka in his initial 25 man squad for the first half of the season.

On 8 January 2011, Rachubka made his first start for Blackpool in a year, against Southampton in the Third Round of the FA Cup. In February 2011, Rachubka suffered another knee injury which ruled him out for large parts of the second half of the season. He returned to light training for Blackpool in mid-March. After only making three appearances during the 2010–11 season, Rachubka was released by Blackpool after they decided not to take up the one-year contract extension they had on Rachubka.

=== Leeds United ===
On 23 June 2011, Rachubka put pen to paper and signed for Leeds United on a two-year contract, linking up with manager Simon Grayson who had previously signed him for Blackpool. Rachubka revealed that he was looking forward to competing for the number one shirt. Rachubka was Leeds' first choice goalkeeper during pre-season, however on 25 July Andy Lonergan was also signed to compete for the position.

Rachubka made his competitive debut for Leeds on 23 August against Doncaster Rovers in the League Cup. He made his league debut against Doncaster Rovers on 14 October as a substitute, replacing the injured Andy Lonergan. With Lonergan out with a broken finger, Rachubka made his first league start of the season against Coventry City on 18 October. However, he made an error in the final minute, spilling a cross which led to Richard Wood equalising in a 1–1 draw. Despite this, Rachubka claimed he was looking to put the mistake behind him and impress to make the number one spot his own.

However, Rachubka made three errors in the first 30 minutes against his old club Blackpool which put Leeds 3–0 down, before being substituted at half time for rookie goalkeeper Alex Cairns. Manager Simon Grayson reacted by signing Reading goalkeeper Alex McCarthy on loan and revealing Rachubka was going to be taken out of the team for a few weeks to rebuild his confidence.

On loan transfer deadline day, 24 November, Rachubka joined Tranmere Rovers on loan until January to help recapture some form. He subsequently joined Leyton Orient on loan until 6 April.

After returning to Leeds, he was transfer listed by new manager Neil Warnock at the end of the 2011–12 season. Rachubka was not initially allocated a squad number for the 2012–13 season. However, he was named as an unused substitute in a League Cup tie against Everton on 25 September, which led to him being allocated the number 31 shirt.

On 1 December 2012, Rachubka joined Accrington Stanley initially on a week-long emergency loan basis due to an injury sustained to first choice goalkeeper Ian Dunbavin. He made his debut for Stanley the same day in their second round FA Cup tie against Oxford United and was named man-of-the-match. The loan was extended twice, on 6 December, and 14 December, and continued into 2013 after Dunbavin's injury ruling him out for most of the season.

On 3 May, it was announced that Rachubka would be released by Leeds upon the expiry of his two-year contract.

=== Oldham Athletic ===
On 7 September 2013, Rachubka joined Oldham Athletic for the second time in his career, signing a short-term deal until January 2014.

After establishing himself as the number one goalkeeper towards the end of the season ahead of Mark Oxley, and a string of excellent performances, Rachubka was rewarded with a new one-year contract extension. On 2 February 2015, Rachubka had his contract cancelled by the club after Kean was brought into the club as the new number one goalkeeper.

=== Crewe Alexandra ===
On 21 February 2015, Rachubka made his debut for Crewe as a substitute in their 2–0 defeat at Barnsley, scoring an own goal.

=== Bolton Wanderers ===
On 5 September 2015, Bolton Wanderers signed Rachubka on a one-year contract to provide cover for Ben Amos.

He made his debut for the Wanderers on 16 January 2016, when coming on as a 12th-minute substitute for midfielder Josh Vela in a 3–0 defeat against Nottingham Forest at The City Ground after Amos had been sent off for a foul on Jamie Ward. At the end of the 2015–16 season, the club confirmed that he would be leaving when his contract expired at the end of June.

=== Kerala Blasters ===
After spending a season with Bury following his release by Bolton, Rachubka signed for Indian Super League side Kerala Blasters in August 2017, linking up with former Manchester United teammate Wes Brown. He made his debut for the Kerala club in the opening match of the 2017–18 season against ATK in Kochi, where the match ended in a 0–0 draw.

== International career ==
Rachubka has represented England at under-16, under-18 and under-20 levels. He was in the England under-20 squad that played at the 1999 FIFA World Youth Championship in Nigeria. He started the last game against Japan under-20s. Rachubka also witnessed the United States' 1–0 victory over England in the group opener in the same tournament.

In November 2008, Rachubka confirmed that he had inquired whether he was eligible to play international football for the United States.

== Honours ==
Huddersfield Town

- Football League Third Division play-offs: 2004

Blackpool

- Football League Championship play-offs: 2010
- Football League One play-offs: 2007

Individual

- Blackpool Player of the Year: 2008–09
