= Sean Paterson =

Scottish footballer

Personal information
- Full name: Sean Patrick Paterson
- Date of birth: 25 March 1987 (age 39)
- Place of birth: Greenock, Scotland
- Position: Forward

Youth career
- Barrow Celtic
- Holker Old Boys
- Blackpool

Senior career*
Years	Team	Apps	(Gls)
2004–2007	Blackpool	2	(0)
2005	→ Lancaster City (loan)	6	(2)
2006	→ Southport (loan)	2	(1)
2007	→ Southport (loan)	14	(3)
2007–2009	AFC Fylde	68	(49)
2009	Lancaster City	16	(5)
2009	Burscough	4	(1)
- * Club domestic league appearances and goals

Sean Paterson (born 25 March 1987 in Greenock, Inverclyde) is a Scottish former professional footballer.

== Career ==
Paterson was on the books of Blackpool between 2004 and 2007 and during that time played two league games for the Seasiders, after being top scorer in the reserves for 2 seasons. In 2005, he went on loan to Lancaster City and he also went on loan to Southport, then playing in the Conference National, for one month in October 2006 and again from January to May 2007.

He was released by Blackpool on 31 May 2007 and in July he signed for North West Counties Football League Division Two club, Kirkham & Wesham, which later became AFC Fylde.He was top scorer in his 1st season and also took the Man of the Match award home from Wembley in the FA Vase final against Lowestoft Town on 11 May 2008 in a 2–1 victory.
