= Keith Southern =

English footballer

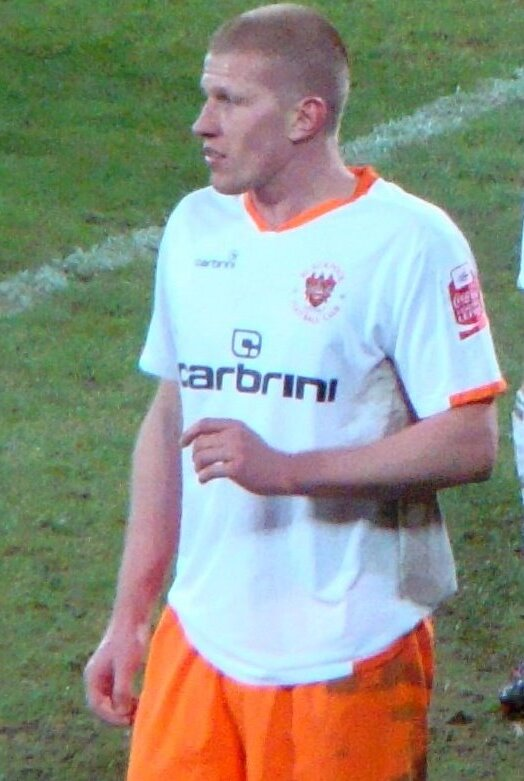
- Southern in 2010

Personal information
- Full name: Keith William Southern
- Date of birth: 24 April 1981 (age 45)
- Place of birth: Gateshead, Tyne and Wear, England
- Height: 1.78 m (5 ft 10 in)
- Position: Midfielder

Senior career*
Years	Team	Apps	(Gls)
1997–2002	Everton	0	(0)
2002	→ Blackpool (loan)	16	(1)
2002–2012	Blackpool	314	(24)
2012–2014	Huddersfield Town	39	(2)
2014–2015	Fleetwood Town	2	(0)
2015	→ Shrewsbury Town (loan)	6	(0)
Total		377	(27)
- * Club domestic league appearances and goals

Keith William Southern (born 24 April 1981) is an English former professional footballer who played as a central midfielder. He made 377 appearances in the Premier League and the Football League, most notably representing Blackpool between 2002 and 2012.

== Club career ==
=== Early career: Everton and loan move to Blackpool ===
Born in Gateshead, Tyne and Wear, Southern started his career at Everton where in the 2001–02 season he captained the club's reserve team. After playing in the Toffees' pre-season friendlies against Wrexham and Shrewsbury Town, on 6 August 2002 he was signed by then Blackpool manager Steve McMahon, initially on loan for one month at the start of the 2002–03 season. He made his league debut four days later in a 2–0 defeat to Bristol City at Ashton Gate. He scored his first goal on 7 September in a 3–0 victory over Tranmere Rovers at Bloomfield Road.

He made a total of sixteen appearances during a three-month loan spell. Then in early November, Blackpool tried to sign him on a season-long loan deal, however, Everton blocked the move, preferring it to be made permanent.

=== Blackpool ===
On 8 November Southern signed a two-and-a-half-year contract with the Seasiders for an undisclosed fee. On 22 March 2003 he was injured five minutes into a 2–2 draw with Stockport County at Edgeley Park and missed the rest of the season. He had an operation on his right knee in April, then on 1 May he was named the Blackpool Gazette Player of the Year, jointly with Martin Bullock.

He returned to action on 13 September in a 2–0 defeat to AFC Bournemouth. On 9 December in a Football League Trophy match against Stockport County, Southern collapsed midway through the second half and he needed keyhole surgery on his knee later that month which revealed he had a slight tear in the medial cartilage, which was removed. He returned to action on 31 January 2004 as a 68th-minute substitute in a 2–2 draw with Swindon Town at Bloomfield Road. When Blackpool won the Football League Trophy at the Millennium Stadium in Cardiff on 21 March, Southern was left out of the squad by Steve McMahon, who chose his son, Stephen, ahead of him.

"I have been totally out of favour ever since my gran's funeral before the cup final, he totally didn't want to know me really and he didn't want to play me. He must have his reasons, but I was as bewildered as everybody else. I didn't lose much sleep when I found out he was going, I was delighted to be honest, it is a fresh start for me in the summer."

— Southern in an interview on the club's official website, following McMahon's departure as manager in May.

Later that year he needed another operation on his knee after going down in the warm up before a pre-season friendly against Ballymena United in Northern Ireland in July. He returned to action on 2 November in a 6–3 win over Huddersfield Town in the Football League Trophy.

After scoring seven goals in the 2004–05 season, including both goals in a 2–1 win over Brentford on 22 March, in April 2005 Southern signed a two-year extension to his contract with the Seasiders. On 28 April he was named the Professional Footballers' Association (PFA) Player of the Year for League One in an online poll voted for by supporters.

On 21 April 2007, Southern scored an 85th-minute winning goal as Blackpool beat Cheltenham Town 2–1 to guarantee the club a play-off position in League One in the 2006–07 season.

==== Promotion and Championship ====
Under the management of Simon Grayson, he also scored in the second leg of the play-off semi-final as Blackpool beat Oldham Athletic 3–1 at Bloomfield Road on 19 May. He played in the play-off final at Wembley as Blackpool beat Yeovil Town 2–0 to secure promotion to the Championship.

Southern scored Blackpool's winning goal on 11 August 2007 in their first match back in the second tier of English football for 29 years as they beat Leicester City 1–0 at the Walkers Stadium on the opening day of the 2007–08 season. On 1 December Southern suffered ankle ligament damage in a 1–0 win over Queens Park Rangers at Bloomfield Road, and had an operation later in the month.

He was out for two months, returning on 12 February 2008 in a 0–0 home draw with Wolverhampton Wanderers.

==== Ian Holloway Era and successes ====
Southern signed a new two-year contract with Blackpool on 6 April 2009. He made his 200th league start for the Seasiders in their first home match of the 2009–10 season, a 1–1 draw with Cardiff City on 15 August 2009 at Bloomfield Road. In his 300th career appearance, on 23 January 2010, he scored as Blackpool beat Watford 3–2 at home. On 22 May 2010 he was named Man of the Match in the 2010 Football League Championship play-off final at Wembley as Blackpool defeated Cardiff City 3–2 to secure promotion to the Premier League.

After suffering a knee injury which ruled him out of the first round of Premier League fixtures, upon his return Southern found himself being used mainly as a substitute. He made his first start against his former club, Everton, on 6 November 2010.

During the first half of Blackpool's 2011–12 campaign, Southern was diagnosed with testicular cancer. He was able to maintain his fitness during his treatment, and two months after his operation he returned to the side, as captain, on 28 January; however, he had to leave the game before the hour mark after suffering a serious gash to his leg.

=== Huddersfield Town ===
After 10 years at Bloomfield Road, it was reported by the Blackpool Gazette and Huddersfield Examiner that Huddersfield Town and Blackpool had sealed a deal, thought to be around the £300,000 mark, on 25 July 2012. The terms allowed Southern to play the first and last 15 minutes of his testimonial match against Everton on 5 August. The transfer was confirmed by Huddersfield Town, the following day, as their sixth signing for the 2012–13 season. Southern made his Huddersfield début in the League Cup first round 2–0 away defeat at Preston North End on 13 August 2012 playing the full 90 minutes. He made his league début in the 1–0 defeat by Cardiff City at the Cardiff City Stadium on 17 August. He scored his first goal for the club in the 1–1 draw against Crystal Palace at Selhurst Park on 22 December. He was released by the club at the end of the 2013–14 season.

=== Fleetwood Town ===
On 20 June 2014, he signed for newly promoted League One side Fleetwood Town for free. He joined rival club Shrewsbury Town, on loan for the rest of the season in League Two on 19 January 2015. After struggling to make the Fleetwood first team following the loan spell in 2015, Southern left the club by mutual consent early the following year. He retired from playing professional football soon after.

== Career statistics ==
Appearances and goals by club, season and competition
Club	Season	League			FA Cup		League Cup		Other		Total	
Club	Season	Division	Apps	Goals	Apps	Goals	Apps	Goals	Apps	Goals	Apps	Goals
Blackpool	2002–03	Second Division	38	1	2	0	1	0	1 (Note: Appearance(s) in Football League Trophy)	0	42	1
Blackpool	2003–04	Second Division	28	2	2	1	2	1	4	1	36	5
Blackpool	2004–05	League One	27	6	3	1	0	0	2	0	32	7
Blackpool	2005–06	League One	42	2	1	0	1	0	2	1	46	3
Blackpool	2006–07	League One	39	5	5	0	1	0	3 (Note: Appearances in Football League One play-offs)	1	48	6
Blackpool	2007–08	Championship	30	3	0	0	2	0	0	0	32	3
Blackpool	2008–09	Championship	35	3	1	0	1	0	0	0	37	3
Blackpool	2009–10	Championship	45	2	1	0	1	0	3 (Note: Appearance(s) in Football League Championship play-offs)	1	50	3
Blackpool	2010–11	Premier League	21	0	1	0	0	0	0	0	22	0
Blackpool	2011–12	Championship	25	1	1	0	0	0	1	0	27	1
Blackpool	Total		330	25	17	2	9	1	16	4	372	32
Huddersfield Town	2012–13	Championship	29	1	0	0	1	0	0	0	30	1
Huddersfield Town	2013–14	Championship	10	1	0	0	1	0	0	0	11	1
Huddersfield Town	Total		39	2	0	0	2	0	0	0	41	2
Fleetwood Town	2014–15	League One	2	0	1	0	0	0	0	0	3	0
Shrewsbury Town (loan)	2014–15	League Two	6	0	-		-		0	0	6	0
Career total			377	27	18	2	11	1	16	4	422	34

== Honours ==
Blackpool

- Football League Championship play-offs: 2010
- Football League One play-offs: 2007

Individual

- Blackpool Player of the Year: 2003–04
- PFA Fans' Player of the Year: 2004–05 League One
