= Lee Jones (footballer, born 1970) =

Welsh footballer and coach

Personal information
- Date of birth: 9 August 1970 (age 56)
- Place of birth: Pontypridd, Wales
- Height: 6 ft 3 in (1.91 m)
- Position: Goalkeeper

Team information
- Current team: Tranmere Rovers (goalkeeper coach)

Senior career*
Years	Team	Apps	(Gls)
–1994	A.F.C. Porth		(0)
1994–1998	Swansea	6	(0)
1993–1994	→ RCD Mallorca (loan)	0	(0)
1995	→ Crewe Alexandra (loan)	0	(0)
1998	→ Bristol Rovers (loan)	0	(0)
1998–2000	Bristol Rovers	11	(0)
2000–2003	Stockport County	68	(0)
2003	→ Blackpool (loan)	3	(0)
2003–2007	Blackpool	78	(0)
2006	→ Bury (loan)	2	(0)
2007	Darlington	9	(0)
2007–2010	Nantwich Town	25	(0)
2010–2012	Morecambe	0	(0)
2014–2018	Morecambe	0	(0)
Total		202	(0)

Managerial career
- 2019: Morecambe (Caretaker)
- * Club domestic league appearances and goals as of 16:54, 21 October 2014 (UTC)

Lee Jones (born 9 August 1970) is a Welsh former professional footballer who played as a goalkeeper. He was born in Pontypridd, Wales.

Jones was signed in 2003 from Stockport County, and also played for Bristol Rovers, Swansea City and Blackpool. In 2004, he started the final as Blackpool won the 2003–04 Football League Trophy.

In December 2006, Jones joined Bury on an emergency seven-day loan. He made his debut against Mansfield Town on 9 December but was not available for Bury's FA Cup replay against Chester due to signing restrictions.

On 8 January 2007, Jones joined Darlington on loan from Blackpool for a month. On 31 January, the move from the club for whom he was voted Player of the Season in 2005–06 was made permanent.

In late 2007, Jones signed for Nantwich Town in the Northern Premier League Division One South. Jones was released in February 2010. He joined Morecambe as a coach, also sitting on the bench when the club became low on first-team goalkeepers.

== Honours ==
Blackpool

- Football League Trophy: 2003–04
