= 2007 Football League play-offs =

2006-2007 The Football League

Football League play-offs
- Season: 2006–07
- Champions: Derby County (Championship); Blackpool (League One); Bristol Rovers (League Two)
- Matches: 15
- Goals: 51 (3.4 per match)
- Biggest home win: Blackpool 3–1 Oldham (League One)
- Biggest away win: Nottm Forest 2–5 Yeovil (League One)
- Highest scoring: Lincoln 3–5 Bristol Rovers (8 goals)
- Highest attendance: 74,993 – Derby v WBA (Championship final)
- Lowest attendance: 7,126 – Shrewsbury v MK Dons (League Two semi-final)
- Average attendance: 27,018

The Football League play-offs for the 2006–07 season were held in May 2007, with the finals taking place at Wembley Stadium in London for the first time. The play-off semi-finals will be played over two legs and will contested by the teams who finish in 3rd, 4th, 5th and 6th place in the Football League Championship and League One and the 4th, 5th, 6th and 7th placed teams in the League Two table. The winners of the semi-finals will go through to the finals, with the winner of the matches gaining promotion for the following season.

== Background ==
The Football League play-offs have been held every year since 1987. They take place for each division following the conclusion of the regular season and are contested by the four clubs finishing below the automatic promotion places.

In the Championship, Derby County, who were aiming to return to the top flight for the first time in 5 years, finished 2 points behind second-placed Birmingham City, who in turn finished 2 points behind champions Sunderland, who both returned to the top flight at the first attempt after relegation from the Premier League last season. West Bromwich Albion who were also relegated from the top flight last season, finished in fourth place in the table. Wolverhampton Wanderers who are aiming to return to the Premiership after a 3-year absence, finished in fifth place. Southampton finished 1 point behind Wolverhampton Wanderers and West Bromwich Albion on 75 points and were looking for a place back in the Premiership after 2 seasons outside the top division.

== Championship ==
Pos	Team	Pld	W	D	L	GF	GA	GD	Pts
3	Derby County	46	25	9	12	62	46	+16	84
4	West Bromwich Albion	46	22	10	14	81	55	+26	76
5	Wolverhampton Wanderers	46	22	10	14	59	56	+3	76
6	Southampton	46	21	12	13	77	53	+24	75

=== Semi-finals ===
First leg

12 May 2007
12:00

Southampton	1–2	Derby County
Surman 7'	Report	Howard 36', 58' (pen.)

St. Mary's Stadium, Southampton
Attendance: 30,602
Referee: Mike Jones

13 May 2007
12:00

Wolverhampton Wanderers	2–3	West Bromwich Albion
Craddock 44'; Olofinjana 52'	Report	Phillips 25', 54'; Kamara 73'

Molineux, Wolverhampton
Attendance: 27,750
Referee: Steve Tanner

Second leg

15 May 2007
19:45

Derby County	2–3 (a.e.t.)	Southampton
Moore 3'; Best 66' (o.g.)	Report	Viafara 4', 54'; Rasiak 89'
Penalties
Jones (penalty scored); Howard (penalty scored); Barnes (penalty scored); McEveley (penalty scored)	4–3	(penalty missed) Best; (penalty scored) Surman; (penalty scored) Skácel; (penalty scored) Rasiak; (penalty missed) Idiakez

Pride Park Stadium, Derby
Attendance: 31,569
Referee: Andy D'Urso

Derby County 4–4 Southampton on aggregate. Derby County won 4–3 on penalties.

16 May 2007
19:45

West Bromwich Albion	1–0	Wolverhampton Wanderers
Phillips 65'	Report

The Hawthorns, West Bromwich
Attendance: 27,415
Referee: Mark Halsey

West Bromwich Albion won 4–2 on aggregate.

=== Final ===
28 May 2007
15:00

Derby County	1–0	West Bromwich Albion
Pearson 61'	Report

Wembley Stadium, London
Attendance: 74,993
Referee: Graham Poll

== League One ==
Pos	Team	Pld	W	D	L	GF	GA	GD	Pts
3	Blackpool	46	24	11	11	76	49	+27	83
4	Nottingham Forest	46	23	13	10	65	41	+24	82
5	Yeovil Town	46	23	10	13	55	39	+16	79
6	Oldham Athletic	46	21	12	13	69	47	+22	75

=== Semi-finals ===
First leg

11 May 2007
19:45

Yeovil Town	0–2	Nottingham Forest
	Report	Commons 23' (pen.); Perch 90' (pen.)

Huish Park, Yeovil
Attendance: 8,935
Referee: Nigel Miller

13 May 2007
17:30

Oldham Athletic	1–2	Blackpool
Liddell 75' (pen.)	Report	Barker 52'; Hoolahan 87'

Boundary Park, Oldham
Attendance: 12,154
Referee: Iain Williamson

Second leg

18 May 2007
19:45

Nottingham Forest	2–5 (a.e.t.)	Yeovil Town
Dobie 47'; Holt 93'	Report	Davies 22', 109'; Wright 82' (o.g.); Stewart 87'; Morris 92'

City Ground, Nottingham
Attendance: 27,819
Referee: Graham Poll

Yeovil Town won 5–4 on aggregate.

19 May 2007
12:00

Blackpool	3–1	Oldham Athletic
Southern 28'; Morrell 75'; Parker 90'	Report	Wolfenden 83'

Bloomfield Road, Blackpool
Attendance: 9,453
Referee: Lee Probert

Blackpool won 5–2 on aggregate.

=== Final ===
27 May 2007
15:00

Blackpool	2–0	Yeovil Town
Williams 43'; Parker 52'	Report

Wembley Stadium, London
Attendance: 59,313
Referee: Andy D'Urso

== League Two ==
Pos	Team	Pld	W	D	L	GF	GA	GD	Pts
4	Milton Keynes Dons	46	25	9	12	76	58	+18	84
5	Lincoln City	46	21	11	14	70	59	+11	74
6	Bristol Rovers	46	20	12	14	49	42	+7	72
7	Shrewsbury Town	46	18	17	11	68	46	+22	71

=== Semi-finals ===
First leg

12 May 2007
17:15

Bristol Rovers	2–1	Lincoln City
Disley 10'; Walker 54'	Report	Hughes 31'

Memorial Ground, Bristol
Attendance: 10,654
Referee: Richard Beeby

14 May 2007
19:45

Shrewsbury Town	0–0	Milton Keynes Dons
	Report

Gay Meadow, Shrewsbury
Attendance: 7,126
Referee: Keith Stroud

Second leg

17 May 2007
19:45

Lincoln City	3–5	Bristol Rovers
Hughes 25', 90'; Stallard 43'	Report	Campbell 3'; Lambert 11'; Walker 36'; Igoe 82'; Rigg 90'

Sincil Bank, Lincoln
Attendance: 7,694
Referee: Graham Laws

Bristol Rovers won 7–4 on aggregate.

18 May 2007
19:45

Milton Keynes Dons	1–2	Shrewsbury Town
Andrews 74'	Report	Cooke 58', 76'

National Hockey Stadium, Milton Keynes
Attendance: 8,212
Referee: Trevor Kettle

Shrewsbury Town won 2–1 on aggregate.

=== Final ===
26 May 2007
15:00

Bristol Rovers	3–1	Shrewsbury Town
Walker 21', 35'; Igoe 90'	Report	Drummond 3'

Wembley Stadium, London
Attendance: 61,589
Referee: Mike Jones
