= 2023–24 English Football League =

125th season of the English Football League

English Football League
- Season: 2023–24
- Champions: Leicester City
- Promoted: Leicester City; Ipswich Town; Southampton
- Relegated: Sutton United; Forest Green Rovers
- New clubs in league: Wrexham; Notts County

The 2023–24 season was the 125th season of the English Football League (EFL) and the eighth season under that name after it was renamed from The Football League in 2016. For the 11th season, the league is sponsored by Sky Betting & Gaming and is therefore known as the Sky Bet EFL.

The EFL is contested through three divisions: the Championship, League One and League Two. The winner and the runner-up of the Championship are automatically promoted to the Premier League and they are joined by the winner of the Championship play-off. The bottom two teams in League Two are relegated to the National League.

== Promotion and relegation ==
=== From the Premier League ===
Relegated to the Championship

- Leicester City
- Leeds United
- Southampton

=== From the Championship ===
Promoted to the Premier League

- Burnley
- Sheffield United
- Luton Town

Relegated to League One

- Reading
- Blackpool
- Wigan Athletic

=== From League One ===
Promoted to the Championship

- Plymouth Argyle
- Ipswich Town
- Sheffield Wednesday

Relegated to League Two

- Milton Keynes Dons
- Morecambe
- Accrington Stanley
- Forest Green Rovers

=== From League Two ===
Promoted to League One

- Leyton Orient
- Stevenage
- Northampton Town
- Carlisle United

Relegated to the National League

- Hartlepool United
- Rochdale

=== From the National League ===
Promoted to League Two

- Wrexham
- Notts County

== Championship ==
=== Table ===
Pos	Team	Pld	W	D	L	GF	GA	GD	Pts	Promotion, qualification or relegation
1	Leicester City (C, P)	46	31	4	11	89	41	+48	97	Promoted to the Premier League
2	Ipswich Town (P)	46	28	12	6	92	57	+35	96	Promoted to the Premier League
3	Leeds United	46	27	9	10	81	43	+38	90	Qualified for the Championship play-offs
4	Southampton (O, P)	46	26	9	11	87	63	+24	87	Qualified for the Championship play-offs
5	West Bromwich Albion	46	21	12	13	70	47	+23	75	Qualified for the Championship play-offs
6	Norwich City	46	21	10	15	79	64	+15	73	Qualified for the Championship play-offs
7	Hull City	46	19	13	14	68	60	+8	70	
8	Middlesbrough	46	20	9	17	71	62	+9	69	
9	Coventry City	46	17	13	16	70	59	+11	64	
10	Preston North End	46	18	9	19	56	67	−11	63	
11	Bristol City	46	17	11	18	53	51	+2	62	
12	Cardiff City	46	19	5	22	53	70	−17	62	
13	Millwall	46	16	11	19	45	55	−10	59	
14	Swansea City	46	15	12	19	59	65	−6	57	
15	Watford	46	13	17	16	61	61	0	56	
16	Sunderland	46	16	8	22	52	54	−2	56	
17	Stoke City	46	15	11	20	49	60	−11	56	
18	Queens Park Rangers	46	15	11	20	47	58	−11	56	
19	Blackburn Rovers	46	14	11	21	60	74	−14	53	
20	Sheffield Wednesday	46	15	8	23	44	68	−24	53	
21	Plymouth Argyle	46	13	12	21	59	70	−11	51	
22	Birmingham City (R)	46	13	11	22	50	65	−15	50	Relegated to EFL League One
23	Huddersfield Town (R)	46	9	18	19	48	77	−29	45	Relegated to EFL League One
24	Rotherham United (R)	46	5	12	29	37	89	−52	27	Relegated to EFL League One

Source: EFL official website
Rules for classification: 1) Points; 2) Goal difference; 3) Number of goals scored; 4) Head-to-head results; 5) Wins; 6) Away goals; 7) Penalty points (sec 9.5); 8) Number of 12-point sending off offences; 9) Play-off (only if needed to determine promotion/relegation)
(C) Champions; (O) Play-off winners; (P) Promoted; (R) Relegated

=== Results ===
Home \ Away	BIR	BLB	BRC	CAR	COV	HUD	HUL	IPS	LEE	LEI	MID	MIL	NOR	PLY	PNE	QPR	ROT	SHW	SOU	STO	SUN	SWA	WAT	WBA
Birmingham City	—	1–0	0–0	0–1	3–0	4–1	0–2	2–2	1–0	2–3	0–1	1–1	1–0	2–1	1–0	0–0	0–0	2–1	3–4	1–3	2–1	2–2	0–1	3–1
Blackburn Rovers	4–2	—	2–1	1–0	0–0	1–1	1–2	0–1	0–2	1–4	2–1	1–1	1–1	1–1	1–2	1–2	2–2	1–3	0–0	3–1	1–3	0–1	1–2	2–1
Bristol City	0–2	5–0	—	0–1	1–0	1–1	3–2	0–1	0–1	1–0	3–2	0–1	1–2	4–1	1–1	0–1	2–0	1–0	3–1	2–3	1–0	1–0	1–1	0–0
Cardiff City	0–1	0–0	2–0	—	3–2	1–0	1–3	2–1	0–3	0–2	1–4	1–0	2–3	2–2	0–2	1–2	2–0	2–1	2–1	2–1	0–2	2–0	1–1	0–1
Coventry City	2–0	1–0	2–2	1–2	—	1–1	2–3	1–2	2–1	3–1	3–0	2–1	1–1	1–0	0–3	1–2	5–0	2–0	1–1	0–0	0–0	2–2	3–3	0–2
Huddersfield Town	1–1	3–0	1–1	0–4	1–3	—	1–2	1–1	1–1	0–1	1–2	1–0	0–4	1–1	1–3	2–1	2–0	4–0	1–1	2–2	1–0	0–4	0–0	1–4
Hull City	1–1	3–2	1–1	3–0	1–1	1–0	—	3–3	0–0	2–2	2–2	1–0	1–2	1–1	1–0	3–0	4–1	4–2	1–2	0–2	0–1	0–1	1–2	1–1
Ipswich Town	3–1	4–3	3–2	3–2	2–1	2–0	3–0	—	3–4	1–1	1–1	3–1	2–2	3–2	4–2	0–0	4–3	6–0	3–2	2–0	2–1	3–2	0–0	2–2
Leeds United	3–0	0–1	2–1	2–2	1–1	4–1	3–1	4–0	—	3–1	3–2	2–0	1–0	2–1	2–1	1–0	3–0	0–0	1–2	1–0	0–0	3–1	3–0	1–1
Leicester City	2–1	0–2	1–0	2–1	2–1	4–1	0–1	1–1	0–1	—	1–2	3–2	3–1	4–0	3–0	1–2	3–0	2–0	5–0	2–0	1–0	3–1	2–0	2–1
Middlesbrough	1–0	0–0	1–2	2–0	1–3	1–1	1–2	0–2	3–4	1–0	—	0–1	3–1	0–2	4–0	0–2	1–1	2–0	2–1	0–2	1–1	2–0	3–1	1–0
Millwall	1–0	1–2	0–1	3–1	0–3	1–1	2–2	0–4	0–3	1–0	1–3	—	1–0	1–0	1–1	2–0	3–0	0–2	0–1	1–0	1–1	0–3	1–0	1–1
Norwich City	2–0	1–3	1–1	4–1	2–1	2–0	2–1	1–0	2–3	0–2	1–2	3–1	—	2–1	0–0	1–0	5–0	3–1	1–1	1–0	1–0	2–2	4–2	2–0
Plymouth Argyle	3–3	3–0	0–1	3–1	2–2	3–1	1–0	0–2	0–2	1–0	3–3	0–2	6–2	—	0–1	1–1	3–2	3–0	1–2	2–1	2–0	1–3	3–3	0–3
Preston North End	2–1	2–2	2–0	1–2	3–2	4–1	0–0	3–2	2–1	0–3	2–1	1–1	0–1	2–1	—	0–2	3–0	0–1	2–2	1–2	2–1	2–1	1–5	0–4
Queens Park Rangers	2–1	0–4	0–0	1–2	1–3	1–1	2–0	0–1	4–0	1–2	0–2	2–0	2–2	0–0	1–0	—	2–1	0–2	0–1	4–2	1–3	1–1	1–2	2–2
Rotherham United	0–0	2–2	1–2	5–2	2–0	0–0	1–2	2–2	1–1	1–2	1–0	2–1	2–1	0–1	1–1	1–1	—	0–1	0–2	0–1	1–1	1–2	0–1	0–2
Sheffield Wednesday	2–0	3–1	2–1	1–2	1–2	0–0	3–1	0–1	0–2	1–1	1–1	0–4	2–2	1–0	0–1	2–1	2–0	—	1–2	1–1	0–3	1–1	0–0	3–0
Southampton	3–1	4–0	1–0	2–0	2–1	5–3	1–2	0–1	3–1	1–4	1–1	1–2	4–4	2–1	3–0	2–1	1–1	4–0	—	0–1	4–2	5–0	3–2	2–1
Stoke City	1–2	0–3	4–0	0–0	0–1	1–1	1–3	0–0	1–0	0–5	2–0	0–0	0–3	3–0	0–2	1–0	4–1	0–1	0–1	—	2–1	1–1	1–0	2–2
Sunderland	3–1	1–5	0–0	0–1	0–3	1–2	0–1	1–2	1–0	0–1	0–4	0–1	3–1	3–1	2–0	0–0	2–1	0–2	5–0	3–1	—	1–2	2–0	2–1
Swansea City	1–1	2–1	1–2	2–0	1–1	1–1	2–2	1–2	0–4	1–3	1–2	0–1	2–1	0–1	2–1	0–1	1–0	3–0	1–3	3–0	0–0	—	0–1	1–0
Watford	2–0	0–1	1–4	0–1	1–2	1–2	0–0	1–2	2–2	1–2	2–3	2–2	3–2	0–0	0–0	4–0	5–0	1–0	1–1	1–1	1–0	1–1	—	2–2
West Bromwich Albion	1–0	4–1	2–0	2–0	2–1	1–2	3–1	2–0	1–0	1–2	4–2	0–0	1–0	0–0	3–0	2–0	2–0	1–0	0–2	1–1	0–1	3–2	2–2	—

Source: efl.com
Legend: Blue = home team win; Yellow = draw; Red = away team win.
For upcoming matches, an "a" indicates there is an article about the rivalry between the two participants.

=== Play-offs ===
Semi-finals
3	Leeds United	0	4	4
6	Norwich City	0	0	0
4	Southampton	0	3	3
5	West Bromwich Albion	0	1	1

Final
3	Leeds United	0
4	Southampton	1

=== Semi-finals ===
First leg

12 May 2024
12:00 BST

Norwich City	0–0	Leeds United
	Report

Carrow Road, Norwich
Attendance: 26,982
Referee: Josh Smith
12 May 2024
14:15 BST

West Bromwich Albion	0–0	Southampton
	Report

The Hawthorns, West Bromwich
Attendance: 25,367
Referee: Sam Barrott

Second leg

16 May 2024
20:00 BST

Leeds United	4–0	Norwich City
Gruev 7'; Piroe 20'; Rutter 40'; Summerville 68'	Report

Elland Road, Leeds
Attendance: 36,384
Referee: Jarred Gillett

Leeds United won 4–0 on aggregate.

17 May 2024
20:00 BST

Southampton	3–1	West Bromwich Albion
Smallbone 49'; A. Armstrong 78', 86' (pen.)	Report	Kipré 90+7'

St Mary's Stadium, Southampton
Attendance: 30,712
Referee: Tim Robinson

Southampton won 3–1 on aggregate.

=== Final ===
26 May 2024
15:00 BST

Leeds United	0–1	Southampton
	Report	A. Armstrong 24'

Wembley Stadium, London
Attendance: 85,862
Referee: John Brooks

== League One ==
=== Table ===
Pos	Team	Pld	W	D	L	GF	GA	GD	Pts	Promotion, qualification or relegation
1	Portsmouth (C, P)	46	28	13	5	78	41	+37	97	Promoted to EFL Championship
2	Derby County (P)	46	28	8	10	78	37	+41	92	Promoted to EFL Championship
3	Bolton Wanderers	46	25	12	9	86	51	+35	87	Qualified for League One play-offs
4	Peterborough United	46	25	9	12	89	61	+28	84	Qualified for League One play-offs
5	Oxford United (O, P)	46	22	11	13	79	56	+23	77	Qualified for League One play-offs
6	Barnsley	46	21	13	12	82	64	+18	76	Qualified for League One play-offs
7	Lincoln City	46	20	14	12	65	40	+25	74	
8	Blackpool	46	21	10	15	65	48	+17	73	
9	Stevenage	46	19	14	13	57	46	+11	71	
10	Wycombe Wanderers	46	17	14	15	60	55	+5	65	
11	Leyton Orient	46	18	11	17	53	55	−2	65	
12	Wigan Athletic	46	20	10	16	63	56	+7	62 (Note: On 19 May 2023, Wigan Athletic were deducted four points for failing to pay players and staff on time following previous EFL rules breaches in the 2022–23 season. Another four-point deduction was applied on 26 May, after the club's owners missed a deadline to deposit an amount equalling 125% of its monthly wage bill.)	
13	Exeter City	46	17	10	19	46	61	−15	61	
14	Northampton Town	46	17	9	20	57	66	−9	60	
15	Bristol Rovers	46	16	9	21	52	68	−16	57	
16	Charlton Athletic	46	11	20	15	64	65	−1	53	
17	Reading	46	16	11	19	68	70	−2	53 (Note: On 16 August 2023, Reading were deducted one point for failing to pay players on time and in full on three occasions in the 2022–23 season. Another 3-point deduction was applied on 13 September, for failing to deposit wages on time. Another 2-point deduction was applied on 27 February, due to late HMRC payments.)	
18	Cambridge United	46	12	12	22	39	61	−22	48	
19	Shrewsbury Town	46	13	9	24	35	67	−32	48	
20	Burton Albion	46	12	10	24	39	67	−28	46	
21	Cheltenham Town (R)	46	12	8	26	41	65	−24	44	Relegated to EFL League Two
22	Fleetwood Town (R)	46	10	13	23	49	72	−23	43	Relegated to EFL League Two
23	Port Vale (R)	46	10	11	25	41	74	−33	41	Relegated to EFL League Two
24	Carlisle United (R)	46	7	9	30	41	81	−40	30	Relegated to EFL League Two

Source: EFL Official Website
Rules for classification: 1) Points; 2) Goal difference; 3) Number of goals scored; 4) Head-to-head results; 5) Wins; 6) Away goals; 7) Penalty points (sec 9.5); 8) 12-point sending off offences
(C) Champions; (O) Play-off winners; (P) Promoted; (R) Relegated

=== Results ===
Home \ Away	BAR	BLA	BOL	BRI	BRT	CAM	CAR	CHA	CHE	DER	EXE	FLE	LEY	LIN	NOR	OXF	PET	POR	PVL	REA	SHR	STE	WIG	WYC
Barnsley	—	0–1	2–2	2–1	2–0	0–2	2–1	1–1	0–0	2–1	1–2	2–2	2–1	1–5	1–1	1–3	1–3	2–3	7–0	2–2	3–0	2–1	1–1	1–0
Blackpool	3–2	—	4–1	3–1	2–0	1–0	3–0	1–1	3–2	1–3	2–0	1–0	0–0	2–0	1–2	1–1	2–4	0–0	0–0	4–1	4–0	3–0	2–1	0–0
Bolton Wanderers	1–1	1–0	—	1–2	1–0	2–0	1–3	3–3	1–0	2–1	7–0	3–1	3–2	3–0	2–1	5–0	1–1	1–1	2–0	5–2	2–2	3–2	0–4	2–1
Bristol Rovers	1–1	1–2	0–2	—	1–2	1–0	2–1	2–1	1–1	0–3	0–1	0–2	1–1	1–1	2–1	3–1	0–2	2–1	3–0	0–2	0–0	1–1	4–1	1–2
Burton Albion	1–3	1–0	1–1	4–1	—	2–1	0–1	2–0	1–2	0–3	0–1	1–1	0–0	0–1	0–2	0–4	1–3	0–2	0–1	3–2	1–0	1–2	2–1	1–1
Cambridge United	0–4	2–1	1–2	2–0	0–0	—	1–0	1–1	0–1	0–1	2–0	2–1	0–2	0–3	1–1	2–0	0–1	0–0	1–1	1–0	1–1	1–2	3–1	1–1
Carlisle United	2–3	0–1	1–4	0–1	2–1	0–4	—	1–1	0–1	0–2	0–2	1–1	0–1	1–3	2–2	1–3	1–1	0–1	2–1	1–3	2–0	2–2	1–1	1–3
Charlton Athletic	2–1	2–2	0–2	1–2	1–1	2–2	3–2	—	2–1	0–1	4–1	2–1	1–0	1–1	2–3	1–2	1–2	0–0	2–3	4–0	1–1	0–0	2–2	3–1
Cheltenham Town	0–2	2–0	0–3	1–3	0–0	1–0	0–1	1–3	—	1–1	1–2	0–2	1–2	1–2	0–1	2–0	2–0	2–1	3–2	2–2	2–0	0–3	1–1	1–3
Derby County	3–0	1–0	1–0	2–1	3–2	0–0	2–0	1–2	2–1	—	2–0	1–0	3–0	3–1	4–0	1–2	2–3	1–1	3–0	2–1	1–1	1–0	1–2	1–1
Exeter City	0–1	0–0	2–2	0–1	1–0	0–0	2–1	1–1	1–0	0–3	—	1–1	1–2	1–1	0–2	1–2	2–1	0–0	0–1	2–1	0–0	1–0	0–2	1–0
Fleetwood Town	1–2	3–3	0–2	0–0	3–0	0–2	1–1	1–1	1–2	1–3	3–0	—	1–0	0–1	2–0	0–3	0–1	0–1	3–0	1–1	0–1	0–3	4–2	1–4
Leyton Orient	1–1	1–0	1–0	0–1	1–2	2–0	3–2	1–0	3–1	0–3	2–2	0–1	—	0–1 (Note: On 3 October, the original fixture was abandoned in the 84th minute, due to a fatality in the crowd. On 16 October, the EFL announced that the game will be replayed in full)	4–3	2–3	1–2	0–4	0–0	2–1	1–0	0–3	1–1	0–0
Lincoln City	2–2	3–0	0–1	5–0	0–1	6–0	1–1	3–1	2–0	0–0	1–0	2–1	1–0	—	1–2	0–2	0–0	0–2	1–1	1–1	3–0	0–0	1–2	3–0
Northampton Town	1–2	0–1	1–1	3–1	2–0	2–1	2–0	1–1	1–0	1–0	1–2	3–0	2–2	2–2	—	2–1	1–0	0–3	2–0	3–1	0–2	0–1	1–1	0–1
Oxford United	0–1	1–1	0–0	2–1	3–0	2–1	1–0	2–1	2–1	2–3	3–0	4–0	1–2	0–1	2–2	—	5–0	2–2	1–2	1–1	3–0	1–1	4–2	2–2
Peterborough United	2–2	1–2	3–3	2–0	4–0	5–0	1–3	1–0	3–0	2–4	2–1	4–1	1–1	2–0	5–1	3–0	—	0–1	3–0	2–2	2–1	3–1	2–3	2–2
Portsmouth	3–2	0–4	2–0	1–1	2–1	3–1	1–0	2–2	0–0	2–2	1–0	1–1	0–3	2–1	4–1	2–1	3–1	—	2–0	4–1	3–1	2–1	1–2	2–1
Port Vale	2–3	3–0	0–1	2–0	2–3	0–0	1–0	3–3	1–2	0–1	2–4	2–2	0–1	0–2	1–0	0–2	0–1	0–1	—	1–0	1–2	2–2	3–2	1–2
Reading	1–3	3–2	2–1	1–1	0–0	4–0	5–1	2–0	1–0	1–0	3–2	1–2	1–1	1–1	1–0	1–1	0–1	2–3	2–0	—	2–3	2–0	2–0	1–2
Shrewsbury Town	1–1	0–2	0–2	0–2	2–1	1–2	1–0	0–0	1–0	1–0	0–3	3–1	1–3	0–1	1–0	1–1	1–2	0–3	2–1	3–2	—	0–1	0–1	0–2
Stevenage	2–1	1–0	0–0	2–3	1–2	1–0	2–2	1–1	2–1	3–1	1–1	0–0	0–1	1–0	3–0	1–3	2–2	0–0	0–0	0–1	2–0	—	1–0	1–0
Wigan Athletic	0–2	1–0	1–0	2–0	1–1	2–1	2–0	2–3	1–1	0–1	1–2	3–0	1–0	0–0	2–1	2–0	2–1	1–2	0–0	1–0	2–0	2–3	—	1–0
Wycombe Wanderers	2–4	2–0	2–4	3–2	0–0	0–0	2–0	1–0	2–0	0–0	0–3	2–2	3–2	1–1	2–0	0–0	5–2	1–3	1–1	1–2	0–1	0–1	1–0	—

Legend: Blue = home team win; Yellow = draw; Red = away team win.
For upcoming matches, an "a" indicates there is an article about the rivalry between the two participants.

=== Play-offs ===
Semi-finals
6	Barnsley	1	3	4
3	Bolton Wanderers	3	2	5
5	Oxford United	1	1	2
4	Peterborough United	0	1	1

Final
3	Bolton Wanderers	0
5	Oxford United	2

First leg

3 May 2024
19:30

Barnsley	1–3	Bolton Wanderers
Cosgrove 76'	Report	Charles 23', 53' (pen.); Williams 90+4'

Oakwell, Barnsley
Attendance: 13,846
Referee: Will Finnie
4 May 2024
19:45

Oxford United	1–0	Peterborough United
Moore 53'	Report

Kassam Stadium, Oxford
Attendance: 11,125
Referee: Lewis Smith

Second leg

7 May 2024
20:00

Bolton Wanderers	2–3	Barnsley
Collins 43'; Toal 45+1'	Report	Cosgrove 36', 76'; Phillips 64'

Toughsheet Community Stadium, Horwich
Attendance: 24,518
Referee: Oliver Langford

Bolton Wanderers won 5–4 on aggregate.

8 May 2024
20:00

Peterborough United	1–1	Oxford United
Knight 41'	Report	Brannagan 45+3' (pen.)

London Road, Peterborough
Attendance: 12,420
Referee: Andrew Kitchen

Oxford United won 2–1 on aggregate.

=== Final ===
18 May 2024
16:15 BST

Bolton Wanderers	0–2	Oxford United
	Report	Murphy 31', 42'

Wembley Stadium, London
Attendance: 70,472
Referee: Sam Barrott

== League Two ==
=== Table ===
Pos	Team	Pld	W	D	L	GF	GA	GD	Pts	Promotion, qualification or relegation
1	Stockport County (C, P)	46	27	11	8	96	48	+48	92	Promoted to EFL League One
2	Wrexham (P)	46	26	10	10	89	52	+37	88	Promoted to EFL League One
3	Mansfield Town (P)	46	24	14	8	90	47	+43	86	Promoted to EFL League One
4	Milton Keynes Dons	46	23	9	14	83	68	+15	78	Qualified for League Two play-offs
5	Doncaster Rovers	46	21	8	17	73	68	+5	71	Qualified for League Two play-offs
6	Crewe Alexandra	46	19	14	13	69	65	+4	71	Qualified for League Two play-offs
7	Crawley Town (O, P)	46	21	7	18	73	67	+6	70	Qualified for League Two play-offs
8	Barrow	46	18	15	13	62	56	+6	69	
9	Bradford City	46	19	12	15	61	59	+2	69	
10	AFC Wimbledon	46	17	14	15	64	51	+13	65	
11	Walsall	46	18	11	17	69	73	−4	65	
12	Gillingham	46	18	10	18	46	57	−11	64	
13	Harrogate Town	46	17	12	17	60	69	−9	63	
14	Notts County	46	18	7	21	89	86	+3	61	
15	Morecambe	46	17	10	19	67	81	−14	58 (Note: On 11 April 2024, Morecambe were deducted three points for failing to pay players and staff on time following previous EFL rules breaches in the 2023–24 season.)	
16	Tranmere Rovers	46	17	6	23	67	70	−3	57	
17	Accrington Stanley	46	16	9	21	63	71	−8	57	
18	Newport County	46	16	7	23	62	76	−14	55	
19	Swindon Town	46	14	12	20	77	83	−6	54	
20	Salford City	46	13	12	21	66	82	−16	51	
21	Grimsby Town	46	11	16	19	57	74	−17	49	
22	Colchester United	46	11	12	23	59	80	−21	45	
23	Sutton United (R)	46	9	15	22	59	84	−25	42	Relegated to National League
24	Forest Green Rovers (R)	46	11	9	26	44	78	−34	42	Relegated to National League

Source: EFL Official Website
Rules for classification: 1) Points; 2) Goal difference; 3) Number of goals scored; 4) Head-to-head results; 5) Wins; 6) Away goals; 7) Penalty points (sec 9.5); 8) 12-point sending off offences
(C) Champions; (O) Play-off winners; (P) Promoted; (R) Relegated

=== Results ===
Home \ Away	ACC	WIM	BAR	BRA	COL	CRA	CRE	DON	FOR	GIL	GRI	HAR	MAN	MIL	MOR	NEW	NCO	SAL	STO	SUT	SWI	TRA	WAL	WRE
Accrington Stanley	—	2–0	1–1	0–3	0–1	0–1	0–0	0–0	2–1	1–2	0–0	2–1	0–3	1–0	1–2	3–0	2–2	3–0	1–3	4–1	3–4	4–1	2–1	2–0
AFC Wimbledon	2–4	—	2–0	0–1	5–3	0–1	2–2	2–0	1–1	2–0	0–0	1–1	2–1	1–0	1–1	0–2	4–2	1–0	1–2	0–1	4–0	4–1	5–1	1–1
Barrow	1–1	0–0	—	1–2	2–0	1–0	1–3	3–2	1–2	2–0	3–1	0–0	1–1	1–0	1–0	1–0	1–1	0–0	2–2	2–1	0–2	1–0	2–0	1–1
Bradford City	1–0	0–0	1–2	—	2–1	2–4	1–0	1–1	0–2	1–0	1–1	1–1	1–5	4–0	2–2	4–1	0–3	1–1	0–0	1–0	1–0	2–0	1–3	1–1
Colchester United	1–1	0–2	1–4	1–1	—	1–2	1–1	1–4	3–3	0–1	2–0	1–2	1–1	2–3	1–3	2–1	5–4	2–1	1–2	1–1	3–1	2–0	1–1	1–2
Crawley Town	3–1	1–2	1–1	1–0	2–3	—	2–4	0–2	2–0	0–1	2–0	2–1	1–3	2–1	1–2	4–1	2–1	0–1	1–1	3–0	3–1	3–2	1–1	0–1
Crewe Alexandra	3–3	1–1	1–3	1–0	2–1	1–0	—	3–2	0–3	2–0	0–3	0–0	2–2	3–1	2–3	4–2	1–0	2–3	0–2	1–0	2–1	2–0	2–2	0–3
Doncaster Rovers	4–0	1–0	4–2	1–3	3–1	2–0	2–0	—	2–0	2–1	1–0	0–1	2–2	3–0	0–5	0–1	1–3	0–3	1–5	4–1	0–0	2–1	2–1	1–0
Forest Green Rovers	0–1	1–1	0–2	0–3	5–0	2–1	1–4	1–2	—	0–0	2–2	0–2	0–4	0–2	1–2	0–3	1–0	0–2	0–3	0–1	1–2	1–0	2–0	1–1
Gillingham	1–0	1–0	3–0	0–2	0–3	0–2	0–0	2–2	1–1	—	1–1	1–0	1–1	2–1	2–1	0–2	1–2	3–1	0–0	1–0	2–2	1–1	1–1	1–0
Grimsby Town	0–2	0–0	2–1	1–1	2–3	2–3	2–1	1–5	1–0	2–0	—	1–2	1–1	1–0	3–2	1–0	5–5	2–0	1–3	1–1	2–0	1–2	1–6	1–3
Harrogate Town	2–1	0–1	0–1	3–0	1–0	1–2	0–1	3–1	0–1	5–1	1–0	—	1–4	3–5	2–0	1–4	3–1	3–2	1–3	2–2	1–1	0–2	0–2	2–2
Mansfield Town	2–1	0–0	1–0	0–0	1–1	1–4	0–1	1–1	1–0	2–1	2–0	9–2	—	1–2	3–0	2–0	1–0	5–1	3–2	1–1	3–2	2–2	2–1	0–0
Milton Keynes Dons	2–1	3–1	2–2	4–1	1–0	2–0	3–1	2–1	2–0	2–1	1–1	0–1	1–4	—	1–2	3–0	1–1	3–1	1–2	4–4	3–2	1–0	5–0	1–1
Morecambe	1–1	4–1	2–1	3–0	0–1	1–0	0–1	0–3	1–2	2–3	1–1	2–2	1–1	1–3	—	1–2	0–0	1–0	1–1	1–0	2–2	1–0	2–1	1–3
Newport County	1–3	2–2	1–1	1–4	2–1	0–4	1–1	4–0	4–2	1–0	1–1	1–2	0–1	0–0	5–3	—	1–3	0–1	2–1	3–1	2–1	1–2	3–3	1–0
Notts County	3–1	0–2	1–1	4–2	1–0	3–1	1–3	3–0	4–3	1–3	3–2	3–0	1–4	3–3	5–0	3–0	—	1–2	2–5	3–4	3–1	2–1	1–2	0–2
Salford City	1–2	0–0	5–3	1–2	1–1	1–1	4–2	2–2	2–2	0–2	0–3	2–2	1–2	2–4	3–1	2–1	0–2	—	2–2	1–2	2–2	1–5	1–2	3–1
Stockport County	4–2	1–0	1–0	1–1	2–0	3–3	1–3	1–0	2–0	0–1	3–2	1–1	0–2	5–0	2–0	1–0	2–1	0–0	—	8–0	0–0	2–0	3–1	5–0
Sutton United	3–1	0–3	2–2	2–1	1–1	2–2	1–1	1–1	0–1	0–1	1–1	1–2	0–2	1–1	2–3	1–1	5–1	0–2	1–3	—	3–1	1–1	4–0	1–2
Swindon Town	1–2	3–2	0–3	2–0	2–2	6–0	2–2	1–2	2–1	0–1	2–1	1–1	2–1	1–2	3–3	2–0	2–1	1–1	2–4	5–3	—	3–1	2–0	0–1
Tranmere Rovers	2–0	3–2	1–2	2–1	1–1	1–3	0–0	1–2	3–0	3–1	2–2	3–0	2–1	1–2	2–3	2–1	4–2	3–4	4–0	1–0	2–1	—	1–3	0–1
Walsall	2–1	1–3	1–1	2–3	1–0	1–1	2–0	3–1	0–0	4–1	1–1	0–1	2–1	0–0	3–0	0–3	1–3	2–1	2–1	1–1	2–1	1–0	—	3–1
Wrexham	4–0	2–0	4–1	0–1	2–1	4–1	3–3	2–1	6–0	2–0	3–0	0–0	2–0	3–5	6–0	2–0	1–0	3–2	2–1	2–1	5–5	0–1	4–2	—

Source: BBC Sport
Legend: Blue = home team win; Yellow = draw; Red = away team win.
For upcoming matches, an "a" indicates there is an article about the rivalry between the two participants.

=== Play-offs ===
Semi-finals
7	Crawley Town	3	5	8
4	Milton Keynes Dons	0	1	1
6	Crewe Alexandra	0	2	2 (4)
5	Doncaster Rovers	2	0	2 (3)

Final
7	Crawley Town	2
6	Crewe Alexandra	0

First leg

6 May 2024	Crewe Alexandra	0–2	Doncaster Rovers	Crewe
17:30 BST	Demetriou (yellow card) 43'	Report	Molyneux 34'; Biggins 48'	Stadium: Gresty Road; Attendance: 8,220; Referee: Sunny Singh Gill

7 May 2024	Crawley Town	3–0	Milton Keynes Dons	Crawley
19:30 BST	Kelly 5'; Williams 45+1'; Maguire (yellow card) 51'; Darcy 65'; Conroy (yellow card) 66'; Gordon (yellow card) 90+3'	Report	Tomlinson (yellow card) 41'; Bate (yellow card) 45'; Harvie (yellow card) 57'	Stadium: Broadfield Stadium; Attendance: 5,564; Referee: Ross Joyce

Second leg

10 May 2024	Doncaster Rovers	0–2 (a.e.t.) (2–2 agg.) (3–4 p)	Crewe Alexandra	Doncaster
20:00 BST	Lo-Tutala (yellow card) 122'	Report	Demetriou 6' (Tabiner); Maxwell 16' (o.g.); Nevitt (yellow card) 23'; Rowe (yellow card) 39'; Austerfield (yellow card) 120'	Stadium: Eco-Power Stadium; Attendance: 12,889; Referee: Scott Oldham
	Penalties
	Ironside (penalty scored); Westbrooke (penalty missed); Miller (penalty scored); Bailey (penalty scored); Adelakun (penalty missed)		(penalty scored) Baker-Richardson; (penalty missed) Demetriou; (penalty scored) Cooney; (penalty scored) Leigh; (penalty scored) Kirk

11 May 2024	Milton Keynes Dons	1–5 (1–8 agg.)	Crawley Town	Milton Keynes
19:45 BST	Dean 45+1' (Tucker) (penalty missed) 67' (yellow card) 90+5'; Tucker (yellow card) 63'; Williams (yellow card) 83'	Report	Williams 3' (yellow card) 61'; Orsi 30' 48' (L. Kelly) 90+2' (Darcy); Lolos (yellow card) 40'; Roles 80'	Stadium: Stadium MK; Attendance: 10,053; Referee: Seb Stockridge

=== Final ===
19 May 2024
13:00 BST

Crawley Town	2–0	Crewe Alexandra
Orsi 41'; L. Kelly 85'	Report

Wembley Stadium, London
Attendance: 33,341
Referee: Ben Toner (Lancashire)

== Managerial changes ==
Team	Outgoing manager	Manner of departure	Date of vacancy	Position in table	Incoming manager	Date of appointment	Position in table
Reading	(England) Paul Ince	Sacked	11 April 2023	2022–23 English Football League	(Spain) Rubén Sellés	26 June 2023	Pre-season
Watford	(England) Chris Wilder	End of contract	3 May 2023	Pre-season	(France) Valérien Ismaël	10 May 2023	Pre-season
Swindon Town	(England) Steve Mildenhall (Republic of Ireland) Gavin Gunning	End of interim spell	8 May 2023	Pre-season	(Wales) Michael Flynn	8 May 2023	Pre-season
Doncaster Rovers	(England) Danny Schofield	Sacked	9 May 2023	Pre-season	(Northern Ireland) Grant McCann	12 May 2023	Pre-season
Milton Keynes Dons	(England) Mark Jackson	Sacked	9 May 2023	Pre-season	(Scotland) Graham Alexander	27 May 2023	Pre-season
Cardiff City	(France) Sabri Lamouchi	End of contract	16 May 2023	Pre-season	(Turkey) Erol Bulut	3 June 2023	Pre-season
Southampton	(Spain) Rubén Sellés	End of contract	28 May 2023	Pre-season	(Scotland) Russell Martin	21 June 2023	Pre-season
Leicester City	(England) Dean Smith	End of contract	28 May 2023	Pre-season	(Italy) Enzo Maresca	16 June 2023	Pre-season
Leeds United	(England) Sam Allardyce	Mutual consent	2 June 2023	Pre-season	(Germany) Daniel Farke	4 July 2023	Pre-season
Shrewsbury Town	(England) Steve Cotterill	Resigned	6 June 2023	Pre-season	(England) Matthew Taylor	26 June 2023	Pre-season
Sheffield Wednesday	(Jamaica) Darren Moore	Mutual consent	19 June 2023	Pre-season	(Spain) Xisco Muñoz	4 July 2023	Pre-season
Swansea City	(Scotland) Russell Martin	Appointed Southampton manager	21 June 2023	Pre-season	(Northern Ireland) Michael Duff	22 June 2023	Pre-season
Barnsley	(Northern Ireland) Michael Duff	Appointed Swansea City manager	22 June 2023	Pre-season	(Scotland) Neill Collins	6 July 2023	Pre-season
Forest Green Rovers	(Scotland) Duncan Ferguson	Sacked	4 July 2023	Pre-season	(England) David Horseman	17 July 2023	Pre-season
Charlton Athletic	(England) Dean Holden	Sacked	27 August 2023	19th	(England) Michael Appleton	8 September 2023	19th
Fleetwood Town	(Scotland) Scott Brown	Sacked	3 September 2023	23rd	(England) Lee Johnson	10 September 2023	23rd
Tranmere Rovers	(England) Ian Dawes	Sacked	10 September 2023	22nd	(England) Nigel Adkins	2 November 2023	23rd
Huddersfield Town	(England) Neil Warnock	Sacked	20 September 2023	16th	(Jamaica) Darren Moore	21 September 2023	16th
Cheltenham Town	(England) Wade Elliott	Mutual consent	20 September 2023	24th	(England) Darrell Clarke	29 September 2023	24th
Bradford City	(Wales) Mark Hughes	Sacked	4 October 2023	18th	(Scotland) Graham Alexander	6 November 2023	16th
Sheffield Wednesday	(Spain) Xisco Muñoz	Sacked	4 October 2023	24th	(Germany) Danny Röhl	13 October 2023	24th
Gillingham	(England) Neil Harris	Sacked	5 October 2023	8th	(England) Stephen Clemence	1 November 2023	9th
Birmingham City	(England) John Eustace	Sacked	9 October 2023	6th	(England) Wayne Rooney	11 October 2023	6th
Milton Keynes Dons	(Scotland) Graham Alexander	Sacked	16 October 2023	16th	(England) Mike Williamson	17 October 2023	16th
Lincoln City	(Republic of Ireland) Mark Kennedy	Sacked	18 October 2023	16th	(England) Michael Skubala	14 November 2023	9th
Millwall	(England) Gary Rowett	Mutual consent	18 October 2023	15th	(England) Joe Edwards	6 November 2023	18th
Colchester United	(England) Ben Garner	Sacked	21 October 2023	22nd	(England) Matthew Etherington	16 November 2023	16th
Bristol Rovers	(England) Joey Barton	Sacked	26 October 2023	16th	(England) Matt Taylor	1 December 2023	11th
Grimsby Town	(England) Paul Hurst	Sacked	28 October 2023	21st	(Gibraltar) David Artell	27 November 2023	21st
Queens Park Rangers	(England) Gareth Ainsworth	Sacked	28 October 2023	23rd	(Spain) Martí Cifuentes	30 October 2023	23rd
Bristol City	(England) Nigel Pearson	Sacked	29 October 2023	15th	(England) Liam Manning	7 November 2023	10th
Oxford United	(England) Liam Manning	Appointed Bristol City manager	7 November 2023	2nd	(England) Des Buckingham	16 November 2023	2nd
Rotherham United	(England) Matt Taylor	Sacked	13 November 2023	22nd	(England) Leam Richardson	11 December 2023	23rd
Morecambe	(Scotland) Derek Adams	Appointed Ross County manager	20 November 2023	9th	(England) Ged Brannan	27 November 2023	12th
Cambridge United	(England) Mark Bonner	Sacked	29 November 2023	18th	(England) Neil Harris	6 December 2023	18th
Swansea City	(Northern Ireland) Michael Duff	Sacked	4 December 2023	18th	(England) Luke Williams	5 January 2024	16th
Sunderland	(England) Tony Mowbray	Sacked	4 December 2023	9th	(England) Michael Beale	18 December 2023	7th
Burton Albion	(Tunisia) Dino Maamria	Sacked	9 December 2023	19th	(Northern Ireland) Martin Paterson	11 January 2024	17th
Stoke City	(Scotland) Alex Neil	Sacked	10 December 2023	20th	(England) Steven Schumacher	19 December 2023	19th
Plymouth Argyle	(England) Steven Schumacher	Appointed Stoke City manager	19 December 2023	16th	(England) Ian Foster	5 January 2024	18th
Sutton United	(England) Matt Gray	Sacked	19 December 2023	24th	(Wales) Steve Morison	6 January 2024	24th
Forest Green Rovers	(England) David Horseman	Mutual consent	20 December 2023	23rd	(England) Troy Deeney	20 December 2023	23rd
Salford City	(England) Neil Wood	Sacked	27 December 2023	21st	(England) Karl Robinson	5 January 2024	21st
Fleetwood Town	(England) Lee Johnson	Sacked	30 December 2023	23rd	(Scotland) Charlie Adam	31 December 2023	23rd
Colchester United	(England) Matthew Etherington	Sacked	1 January 2024	22nd	(England) Danny Cowley	4 January 2024	22nd
Birmingham City	(England) Wayne Rooney	Sacked	2 January 2024	20th	(England) Tony Mowbray	8 January 2024	20th
Notts County	(England) Luke Williams	Appointed Swansea City manager	5 January 2024	5th	(England) Stuart Maynard	18 January 2024	6th
Swindon Town	(Wales) Michael Flynn	Mutual consent	15 January 2024	15th	(Republic of Ireland) Mark Kennedy	29 May 2024	2024–25 English Football League
Forest Green Rovers	(England) Troy Deeney	Sacked	18 January 2024	24th	(England) Steve Cotterill	25 January 2023	24th
Shrewsbury Town	(England) Matt Taylor	Sacked	21 January 2024	19th	(England) Paul Hurst	24 January 2024	20th
Charlton Athletic	(England) Michael Appleton	Sacked	24 January 2024	16th	(Wales) Nathan Jones	4 February 2024	19th
Huddersfield Town	(Jamaica) Darren Moore	Sacked	29 January 2024	21st	(Germany) Andre Breitenreiter	15 February 2024	20th
Port Vale	(England) Andy Crosby	Sacked	5 February 2024	20th	(Jamaica) Darren Moore	13 February 2024	21st
Blackburn Rovers	(Denmark) Jon Dahl Tomasson	Mutual consent	9 February 2024	18th	(England) John Eustace	9 February 2024	18th
Sunderland	(England) Michael Beale	Sacked	19 February 2024	10th	(France) Régis Le Bris	22 June 2024	2024–25 English Football League
Millwall	(England) Joe Edwards	Sacked	21 February 2024	21st	(England) Neil Harris	21 February 2024	21st
Cambridge United	(England) Neil Harris	Appointed Millwall manager	21 February 2024	17th	(England) Garry Monk	4 March 2024	19th
Accrington Stanley	(England) John Coleman	Sacked	3 March 2024	16th	(England) John Doolan	22 March 2024	16th
Watford	(France) Valérien Ismaël	Sacked	9 March 2024	13th	(England) Tom Cleverley	24 April 2024	15th
Plymouth Argyle	(England) Ian Foster	Sacked	1 April 2024	21st	(England) Wayne Rooney	25 May 2024	2024–25 English Football League
Rotherham United	(England) Leam Richardson	Sacked	17 April 2024	24th	(Scotland) Steve Evans	17 April 2024	24th
Stevenage	(Scotland) Steve Evans	Appointed Rotherham United manager	17 April 2024	9th	(England) Alex Revell	9 May 2024	2024–25 English Football League
Barnsley	(Scotland) Neill Collins	Sacked	22 April 2024	5th	(England) Darrell Clarke	23 May 2024	2024–25 English Football League
