= 2024–25 English Football League =

126th season of the English Football League

English Football League
- Season: 2024–25
- Champions: Leeds United
- Promoted: Burnley; Sunderland
- Relegated: Carlisle United; Morecambe
- New clubs in league: Chesterfield; Bromley

The 2024–25 season was the 126th season of the English Football League (EFL) and the ninth season under that name after it was renamed from The Football League in 2016. For the 12th season, the league is sponsored by Sky Betting & Gaming and is therefore known as the Sky Bet EFL.

The EFL is contested through three divisions: the Championship, League One and League Two. The winner and the runner-up of the Championship are automatically promoted to the Premier League and they are joined by the winner of the Championship play-off. The bottom two teams in League Two are relegated to the National League.

== Promotion and relegation ==
=== From the Premier League ===
Relegated to the Championship

- Luton Town
- Burnley
- Sheffield United

=== From the Championship ===
Promoted to the Premier League

- Leicester City
- Ipswich Town
- Southampton

Relegated to League One

- Birmingham City
- Huddersfield Town
- Rotherham United

=== From League One ===
Promoted to the Championship

- Portsmouth
- Derby County
- Oxford United

Relegated to League Two

- Cheltenham Town
- Fleetwood Town
- Port Vale
- Carlisle United

=== From League Two ===
Promoted to League One

- Stockport County
- Wrexham
- Mansfield Town
- Crawley Town

Relegated to the National League

- Sutton United
- Forest Green Rovers

=== From the National League ===
Promoted to League Two

- Chesterfield
- Bromley

== Map of teams ==
Locations of the 2024–25 English Football League teams:
Red: Region
Blue: Championship
Yellow: League One
Green: League Two
Locations of the 2024–25 English Football League teams in Greater London
Locations of the 2024–25 English Football League teams in the West Midlands
Locations of the 2024–25 English Football League teams in East Midlands
Locations of the 2024–25 English Football League teams in East Midlands
Locations of the 2024–25 English Football League teams in Greater Manchester
Locations of the 2024–25 English Football League teams in South Yorkshire
Locations of the 2024–25 English Football League teams in Lancashire

== Championship ==
=== Table ===
Pos	Team	Pld	W	D	L	GF	GA	GD	Pts	Promotion, qualification or relegation
1	Leeds United (C, P)	46	29	13	4	95	30	+65	100	Promotion to the Premier League
2	Burnley (P)	46	28	16	2	69	16	+53	100	Promotion to the Premier League
3	Sheffield United	46	28	8	10	63	36	+27	90 (Note: Sheffield United were deducted two points for defaulting on payments to other clubs during the 2022–23 and 2023–24 seasons, with a further two points suspended.)	Qualified for the Championship play-offs
4	Sunderland (O, P)	46	21	13	12	58	44	+14	76	Qualified for the Championship play-offs
5	Coventry City	46	20	9	17	64	58	+6	69	Qualified for the Championship play-offs
6	Bristol City	46	17	17	12	59	55	+4	68	Qualified for the Championship play-offs
7	Blackburn Rovers	46	19	9	18	53	48	+5	66	
8	Millwall	46	18	12	16	47	49	−2	66	
9	West Bromwich Albion	46	15	19	12	57	47	+10	64	
10	Middlesbrough	46	18	10	18	64	56	+8	64	
11	Swansea City	46	17	10	19	51	56	−5	61	
12	Sheffield Wednesday	46	15	13	18	60	69	−9	58	
13	Norwich City	46	14	15	17	71	68	+3	57	
14	Watford	46	16	9	21	53	61	−8	57	
15	Queens Park Rangers	46	14	14	18	53	63	−10	56	
16	Portsmouth	46	14	12	20	58	71	−13	54	
17	Oxford United	46	13	14	19	49	65	−16	53	
18	Stoke City	46	12	15	19	45	62	−17	51	
19	Derby County	46	13	11	22	48	56	−8	50	
20	Preston North End	46	10	20	16	48	59	−11	50	
21	Hull City	46	12	13	21	44	54	−10	49	
22	Luton Town (R)	46	13	10	23	45	69	−24	49	Relegation to EFL League One
23	Plymouth Argyle (R)	46	11	13	22	51	88	−37	46	Relegation to EFL League One
24	Cardiff City (R)	46	9	17	20	48	73	−25	44	Relegation to EFL League One

Source: English Football League
Rules for classification: 1) Points; 2) Goal difference; 3) Number of goals scored; 4) Head-to-head results; 5) Wins; 6) Away goals; 7) Penalty points (sec 9.5); 8) Number of 12-point sending off offences; 9) Play-off (only if needed to determine promotion/relegation)
(C) Champions; (O) Play-off winners; (P) Promoted; (R) Relegated

=== Results ===
Home \ Away	BLA	BRI	BUR	CAR	COV	DER	HUL	LEE	LUT	MID	MIL	NOR	OXF	PLY	POR	PNE	QPR	SHU	SHW	STO	SUN	SWA	WAT	WBA
Blackburn Rovers	—	3–0	0–1	1–2	0–2	4–2	0–1	1–0	2–0	0–2	4–1	1–1	2–1	2–0	3–0	2–1	2–0	0–2	2–2	0–2	2–2	1–0	2–1	0–0
Bristol City	2–1	—	0–1	1–1	1–1	1–0	1–1	0–0	1–0	2–1	4–3	2–1	2–1	4–0	3–0	2–2	1–1	1–2	0–0	2–0	2–1	0–1	2–1	2–1
Burnley	1–1	1–0	—	5–0	2–0	0–0	2–0	0–0	4–0	1–1	3–1	2–1	1–0	1–0	2–1	0–0	0–0	2–1	4–0	0–0	0–0	1–0	2–1	1–1
Cardiff City	1–3	1–1	1–2	—	1–1	2–1	1–0	0–2	1–2	0–2	1–0	2–1	1–1	5–0	2–0	0–2	0–2	0–2	1–1	0–1	0–2	3–0	1–1	0–0
Coventry City	3–0	1–0	1–2	2–2	—	1–2	2–1	0–2	3–2	2–0	0–0	0–1	3–2	4–0	1–0	2–1	1–0	2–2	1–2	3–2	3–0	1–2	2–1	2–0
Derby County	2–1	3–0	0–0	1–0	2–0	—	1–1	0–1	0–1	1–0	0–1	2–3	0–0	1–1	4–0	2–0	2–0	0–1	1–2	0–0	0–1	1–2	0–2	2–1
Hull City	0–1	1–1	1–1	4–1	1–1	0–1	—	3–3	0–1	0–1	0–0	1–1	2–1	2–0	1–1	2–1	1–2	0–2	0–2	1–2	0–1	2–1	1–1	1–2
Leeds United	1–1	4–0	0–1	7–0	3–0	2–0	2–0	—	3–0	3–1	2–0	2–0	4–0	3–0	3–3	2–1	2–0	2–0	3–0	6–0	2–1	2–2	2–1	1–1
Luton Town	0–1	3–1	1–4	1–0	1–0	2–1	1–0	1–1	—	0–0	0–1	0–1	2–2	1–1	1–0	0–0	1–2	0–1	2–1	2–1	1–2	1–1	3–0	1–1
Middlesbrough	0–1	0–2	0–0	1–1	0–3	1–0	3–1	0–1	5–1	—	1–0	0–0	2–1	2–1	2–2	1–1	2–1	1–0	3–3	2–0	2–3	1–0	0–1	2–0
Millwall	1–0	0–2	1–0	2–2	0–1	1–1	0–1	1–0	0–1	1–0	—	3–1	0–1	1–0	2–1	3–1	2–1	0–1	3–0	1–0	1–1	1–0	2–3	1–1
Norwich City	2–2	0–2	1–2	4–2	2–1	1–1	4–0	1–1	4–2	3–3	2–1	—	1–1	6–1	3–5	0–1	1–1	1–1	2–3	4–2	0–0	5–1	4–1	1–0
Oxford United	1–0	1–1	0–0	3–2	2–3	1–1	1–0	0–1	3–2	2–6	1–1	2–0	—	2–0	0–2	3–1	1–3	1–0	1–3	1–0	2–0	1–2	1–0	1–1
Plymouth Argyle	2–1	2–2	0–5	1–1	3–1	2–3	1–1	1–2	3–1	3–3	5–1	2–1	1–1	—	1–0	3–3	0–1	2–1	0–3	0–1	3–2	1–2	2–2	2–1
Portsmouth	1–0	3–0	0–0	2–1	4–1	2–2	1–1	1–0	0–0	2–1	0–1	0–0	1–1	1–2	—	3–1	2–1	0–0	1–2	3–1	1–3	4–0	1–0	0–3
Preston North End	0–0	1–3	0–0	2–2	1–0	1–1	1–0	1–1	1–0	2–1	1–1	2–2	1–1	1–2	2–1	—	1–2	0–2	3–1	1–1	0–0	0–0	3–0	1–1
Queens Park Rangers	2–1	1–1	0–5	0–0	1–1	4–0	1–3	2–2	2–1	1–4	1–1	3–0	2–0	1–1	1–2	2–1	—	1–2	0–2	1–1	0–0	1–2	3–1	1–3
Sheffield United	1–1	1–1	0–2	2–0	3–1	1–0	0–3	1–3	2–0	3–1	0–1	2–0	3–0	2–0	2–1	1–0	2–2	—	1–0	2–0	1–0	1–0	1–0	1–1
Sheffield Wednesday	0–1	2–2	0–2	1–1	1–2	4–2	0–1	0–2	1–1	2–1	2–2	2–0	0–1	4–0	1–1	1–1	1–1	0–1	—	2–0	1–2	0–0	2–6	3–2
Stoke City	1–0	2–2	0–2	2–2	1–0	2–1	1–3	0–2	1–1	1–3	1–1	1–1	0–0	0–0	6–1	0–0	3–1	0–2	2–0	—	1–0	3–1	0–0	1–2
Sunderland	0–1	1–1	1–0	2–1	2–2	2–0	0–1	2–2	2–0	1–0	1–0	2–1	2–0	2–2	1–0	1–1	0–1	2–1	4–0	2–1	—	0–1	2–2	0–0
Swansea City	3–0	1–1	0–2	1–1	0–2	1–0	1–0	3–4	2–1	1–0	0–1	1–0	3–3	3–0	2–2	3–0	3–0	1–2	0–1	0–0	2–3	—	1–0	1–1
Watford	1–0	1–0	1–2	1–2	1–1	2–1	1–0	0–4	2–0	2–1	1–2	0–1	1–0	0–0	2–1	1–2	0–0	1–2	1–1	3–0	2–1	1–0	—	2–1
West Bromwich Albion	0–2	2–0	0–0	0–0	2–0	1–3	1–1	0–0	5–3	0–1	0–0	2–2	2–0	1–0	5–1	3–1	1–0	2–2	2–1	1–1	0–1	1–0	2–1	—

Source: BBC Sport
Legend: Blue = home team win; Yellow = draw; Red = away team win.
For upcoming matches, an "a" indicates there is an article about the rivalry between the two participants.

=== Bracket ===
Semi-finals
3	Sheffield United	3	3	6
6	Bristol City	0	0	0
4	Sunderland (a.e.t.)	2	1	3
5	Coventry City	1	1	2

Final
3	Sheffield United	1
4	Sunderland	2

=== Semi-finals ===
First leg

8 May 2025
20:00 BST

Bristol City	0–3	Sheffield United
	Report	Burrows 45+3' (pen.); Brooks 73'; O'Hare 79'

Ashton Gate, Bristol
Attendance: 25,652
Referee: Oliver Langford
9 May 2025
20:00 BST

Coventry City	1–2	Sunderland
Rudoni 70'	Report	Isidor 68'; Mayenda 88'

Coventry Building Society Arena, Coventry
Attendance: 31,293
Referee: John Busby

Second leg

12 May 2025
20:00 BST

Sheffield United	3–0	Bristol City
Moore 41'; Hamer 52'; O'Hare 83'	Report

Bramall Lane, Sheffield
Attendance: 26,543
Referee: Peter Bankes

Sheffield United won 6–0 on aggregate.

13 May 2025
20:00 BST

Sunderland	1–1 (a.e.t.)	Coventry City
Ballard 120+2'	Report	Mason-Clark 76'

Stadium of Light, Sunderland
Attendance: 46,530
Referee: Andrew Madley

Sunderland won 3–2 on aggregate.

=== Final ===
24 May 2025
15:01 BST

Sheffield United	1–2	Sunderland
Campbell 25'	Report	Mayenda 76'; Watson 90+5'

Wembley Stadium, London
Attendance: 82,718
Referee: Chris Kavanagh

== League One ==
=== Table ===
Pos	Team	Pld	W	D	L	GF	GA	GD	Pts	Promotion, qualification or relegation
1	Birmingham City (C, P)	46	34	9	3	84	31	+53	111	Promotion to EFL Championship
2	Wrexham (P)	46	27	11	8	67	34	+33	92	Promotion to EFL Championship
3	Stockport County	46	25	12	9	72	42	+30	87	Qualification for League One play-offs
4	Charlton Athletic (O, P)	46	25	10	11	67	43	+24	85	Qualification for League One play-offs
5	Wycombe Wanderers	46	24	12	10	70	45	+25	84	Qualification for League One play-offs
6	Leyton Orient	46	24	6	16	72	48	+24	78	Qualification for League One play-offs
7	Reading	46	21	12	13	68	57	+11	75	
8	Bolton Wanderers	46	20	8	18	67	70	−3	68	
9	Blackpool	46	17	16	13	72	60	+12	67	
10	Huddersfield Town	46	19	7	20	58	55	+3	64	
11	Lincoln City	46	16	13	17	64	56	+8	61	
12	Barnsley	46	17	10	19	69	73	−4	61	
13	Rotherham United	46	16	11	19	54	59	−5	59	
14	Stevenage	46	15	12	19	42	50	−8	57	
15	Wigan Athletic	46	13	17	16	40	42	−2	56	
16	Exeter City	46	15	11	20	49	65	−16	56	
17	Mansfield Town	46	15	9	22	60	73	−13	54	
18	Peterborough United	46	13	12	21	68	81	−13	51	
19	Northampton Town	46	12	15	19	48	66	−18	51	
20	Burton Albion	46	11	14	21	49	66	−17	47	
21	Crawley Town (R)	46	12	10	24	57	83	−26	46	Relegation to EFL League Two
22	Bristol Rovers (R)	46	12	7	27	44	76	−32	43	Relegation to EFL League Two
23	Cambridge United (R)	46	9	11	26	45	73	−28	38	Relegation to EFL League Two
24	Shrewsbury Town (R)	46	8	9	29	41	79	−38	33	Relegation to EFL League Two

Source: EFL Official Website
Rules for classification: 1) Points; 2) Goal difference; 3) Number of goals scored; 4) Head-to-head results; 5) Wins; 6) Away goals; 7) Penalty points (sec 9.5); 8) 12-point sending off offences
(C) Champions; (O) Play-off winners; (P) Promoted; (R) Relegated

=== Results ===
Home \ Away	BAR	BIR	BLA	BOL	BRI	BRT	CAM	CHA	CRA	EXE	HUD	LEY	LIN	MAN	NOR	PET	REA	ROT	SHR	STE	STK	WIG	WRX	WYC
Barnsley	—	1–2	0–3	4–1	2–1	0–0	1–1	2–2	3–0	1–2	1–2	0–4	4–3	1–2	2–2	1–1	2–2	2–0	1–2	0–1	1–1	0–1	2–1	2–2
Birmingham City	6–2	—	0–0	2–0	2–0	2–0	4–0	1–0	0–0	1–0	1–0	2–0	1–0	4–0	1–1	3–2	1–1	2–1	4–1	2–1	2–0	2–1	3–1	1–0
Blackpool	1–2	0–2	—	2–1	4–1	3–0	2–1	2–2	3–1	2–1	2–2	1–2	1–1	3–3	0–0	0–0	3–0	0–0	1–1	0–0	0–3	2–2	1–2	2–2
Bolton Wanderers	1–2	3–1	2–1	—	1–0	2–1	2–2	1–2	4–3	0–2	0–4	2–1	3–0	3–1	3–1	1–0	5–2	0–1	2–2	1–1	0–1	0–2	0–0	0–2
Bristol Rovers	3–1	1–2	0–2	3–2	—	3–1	2–0	3–2	0–0	1–2	1–0	2–3	1–1	1–2	1–0	3–1	0–2	2–3	1–0	0–1	1–1	0–4	1–1	1–2
Burton Albion	1–2	1–2	1–1	1–2	1–3	—	2–1	0–1	0–0	1–2	3–0	2–1	2–3	1–1	0–1	2–2	3–2	4–2	2–0	0–0	0–3	1–1	0–1	2–3
Cambridge United	1–1	1–2	4–4	1–1	0–1	1–0	—	0–1	0–1	0–1	0–4	1–2	0–2	3–2	1–1	0–1	1–3	0–1	4–1	0–1	2–0	2–0	2–2	1–1
Charlton Athletic	1–0	1–0	1–2	2–0	2–0	3–1	2–1	—	1–2	3–0	4–0	1–0	2–2	0–0	2–1	2–1	0–0	1–1	1–0	2–0	1–1	2–1	2–2	2–1
Crawley Town	0–3	0–1	2–1	0–2	1–0	1–1	0–2	0–1	—	3–1	2–2	1–3	3–0	0–2	3–0	3–4	1–1	1–0	3–5	3–1	1–1	1–1	1–2	1–1
Exeter City	1–2	0–2	1–3	1–2	3–1	0–0	1–0	1–0	4–4	—	3–1	2–6	0–0	2–0	1–1	1–2	1–2	1–0	2–0	2–0	0–2	1–1	0–2	2–2
Huddersfield Town	2–0	0–1	0–2	0–1	3–1	1–1	1–2	2–1	5–1	2–0	—	1–4	2–2	2–1	1–3	0–1	0–0	0–0	1–0	2–1	1–0	1–0	0–1	0–1
Leyton Orient	4–3	1–2	3–0	1–2	3–0	0–0	2–0	1–2	3–0	0–1	0–2	—	3–2	3–0	1–2	2–2	2–0	1–0	1–0	1–0	0–1	0–0	0–0	1–0
Lincoln City	1–2	1–3	0–2	4–2	5–0	0–1	1–1	0–0	4–1	0–0	1–0	2–1	—	4–1	2–1	5–1	2–0	0–1	1–1	0–0	2–1	0–0	0–2	2–3
Mansfield Town	2–1	1–1	2–0	2–1	0–1	3–3	2–1	1–2	0–1	3–0	1–2	2–3	0–3	—	0–1	4–2	1–5	1–0	2–1	0–1	1–1	0–0	1–2	1–2
Northampton Town	1–2	1–1	0–2	2–4	2–1	0–0	0–0	0–5	3–0	2–1	3–2	1–0	0–1	0–2	—	2–1	0–0	0–2	4–1	0–0	1–1	1–1	0–2	1–2
Peterborough United	1–3	1–2	5–1	1–1	3–2	0–1	6–1	3–0	4–3	1–1	0–2	0–0	1–1	0–3	0–4	—	1–2	3–3	3–1	2–1	1–1	1–0	0–2	1–1
Reading	2–4	0–0	0–3	1–0	1–0	3–1	3–0	2–0	4–1	0–0	2–1	0–1	0–1	2–1	4–1	3–1	—	2–1	1–1	1–1	1–3	2–0	2–0	1–0
Rotherham United	0–1	0–2	2–1	3–1	0–0	2–2	2–1	4–2	0–4	1–1	2–1	1–0	2–1	3–3	3–0	2–1	2–1	—	1–2	2–0	1–1	0–1	0–1	2–3
Shrewsbury Town	0–2	3–2	1–2	2–3	0–0	0–2	0–1	0–1	1–2	0–2	0–1	3–0	1–0	2–1	1–1	1–4	1–3	1–1	—	0–1	0–2	0–1	2–1	1–4
Stevenage	3–0	0–1	1–3	1–4	3–0	0–1	0–2	1–0	3–1	4–1	1–2	0–0	0–1	1–1	2–0	1–1	1–1	1–1	1–0	—	2–1	1–2	1–0	0–3
Stockport County	2–1	1–1	2–1	5–0	2–0	2–1	2–0	0–0	2–0	2–0	2–1	1–4	3–2	1–2	1–1	2–1	4–1	3–1	1–0	3–0	—	0–0	1–0	0–5
Wigan Athletic	1–1	0–3	1–1	0–1	2–0	1–2	1–0	0–1	1–0	0–0	2–1	0–2	1–1	1–2	2–1	3–0	1–2	1–0	2–2	0–0	0–2	—	0–0	0–1
Wrexham	1–0	1–1	2–1	0–0	1–1	3–0	2–2	3–0	2–1	3–0	0–0	1–2	1–0	1–0	4–1	1–0	3–0	1–0	3–0	2–3	1–0	2–1	—	3–2
Wycombe Wanderers	2–1	2–3	1–1	0–0	2–0	2–0	2–1	0–4	1–0	2–1	0–1	3–0	1–0	1–0	0–0	3–1	1–1	2–0	0–0	1–0	1–3	0–0	0–1	—

Legend: Blue = home team win; Yellow = draw; Red = away team win.
For upcoming matches, an "a" indicates there is an article about the rivalry between the two participants.

=== Bracket ===
Semi-finals
6	Leyton Orient	2	1	3 (4)
3	Stockport County	2	1	3 (1)
5	Wycombe Wanderers	0	0	0
4	Charlton Athletic	0	1	1

Final
6	Leyton Orient	0
4	Charlton Athletic	1

=== Semi-finals ===
First leg

10 May 2025
12:30 BST

Leyton Orient	2–2	Stockport County
Kelman 30', 88' (pen.)	Report	Norwood 60' (pen.); Horsfall 65'

Brisbane Road, London
Attendance: 8,571
Referee: Ben Speedie
11 May 2025
18:30 BST

Wycombe Wanderers	0–0	Charlton Athletic
	Report

Adams Park, High Wycombe
Attendance: 6,585
Referee: Farai Hallam

Second leg

14 May 2025
20:00 BST

Stockport County	1–1 (a.e.t.)	Leyton Orient
Olaofe 74'	Report	O'Neill 3'
Penalties
Norwood (penalty scored); Diamond (penalty missed); Rydel (penalty missed)	1–4	(penalty scored) James; (penalty scored) Clare; (penalty scored) Abdulai; (penalty scored) Galbraith

Edgeley Park, Stockport
Attendance: 10,592
Referee: James Bell

3–3 on aggregate, Leyton Orient won 4–1 on penalties.

15 May 2025
20:00 BST

Charlton Athletic	1–0	Wycombe Wanderers
Godden 81'	Report

The Valley, London
Attendance: 25,722
Referee: Dean Whitestone

Charlton Athletic won 1–0 on aggregate.

=== Final ===
25 May 2025
13:01 BST

Charlton Athletic	1–0	Leyton Orient
Gillesphey 31'	Report

Wembley Stadium, London
Attendance: 76,193
Referee: Andrew Kitchen

== League Two ==
=== Table ===
Pos	Team	Pld	W	D	L	GF	GA	GD	Pts	Promotion, qualification or relegation
1	Doncaster Rovers (C, P)	46	24	12	10	73	50	+23	84	Promotion to EFL League One
2	Port Vale (P)	46	22	14	10	65	46	+19	80	Promotion to EFL League One
3	Bradford City (P)	46	22	12	12	64	45	+19	78	Promotion to EFL League One
4	Walsall	46	21	14	11	75	54	+21	77	Qualification for League Two play-offs
5	AFC Wimbledon (O, P)	46	20	13	13	56	35	+21	73	Qualification for League Two play-offs
6	Notts County	46	20	12	14	68	49	+19	72	Qualification for League Two play-offs
7	Chesterfield	46	19	13	14	73	54	+19	70	Qualification for League Two play-offs
8	Salford City	46	18	15	13	64	54	+10	69	
9	Grimsby Town	46	20	8	18	61	67	−6	68	
10	Colchester United	46	16	19	11	52	47	+5	67	
11	Bromley	46	17	15	14	64	59	+5	66	
12	Swindon Town	46	15	17	14	71	63	+8	62	
13	Crewe Alexandra	46	15	17	14	49	48	+1	62	
14	Fleetwood Town	46	15	15	16	60	60	0	60	
15	Cheltenham Town	46	16	12	18	60	70	−10	60	
16	Barrow	46	15	14	17	52	50	+2	59	
17	Gillingham	46	14	16	16	41	46	−5	58	
18	Harrogate Town	46	14	11	21	43	61	−18	53	
19	Milton Keynes Dons	46	14	10	22	52	66	−14	52	
20	Tranmere Rovers	46	12	15	19	45	65	−20	51	
21	Accrington Stanley	46	12	14	20	53	69	−16	50	
22	Newport County	46	13	10	23	52	76	−24	49	
23	Carlisle United (R)	46	10	12	24	44	71	−27	42	Relegation to National League
24	Morecambe (R)	46	10	6	30	40	72	−32	36	Relegation to National League

Source: EFL Official Website
Rules for classification: 1) Points; 2) Goal difference; 3) Number of goals scored; 4) Head-to-head results; 5) Wins; 6) Away goals; 7) Penalty points (sec 9.5); 8) 12-point sending off offences
(C) Champions; (O) Play-off winners; (P) Promoted; (R) Relegated

=== Results ===
Home \ Away	ACC	WIM	BAR	BRA	BRM	CAR	CHT	CHF	COL	CRE	DON	FLE	GIL	GRI	HAR	MIL	MOR	NEW	NCO	POV	SAL	SWI	TRA	WAL
Accrington Stanley	—	0–0	1–0	0–0	1–2	1–1	0–0	0–1	1–1	0–1	1–2	1–4	1–1	3–2	3–3	2–0	2–1	5–0	0–3	2–2	0–2	2–2	3–3	0–0
AFC Wimbledon	2–2	—	2–2	1–0	0–1	4–0	1–2	0–0	4–2	3–0	1–0	1–0	1–0	0–1	1–0	3–0	3–0	2–2	2–0	0–2	1–0	1–1	2–0	0–1
Barrow	2–0	1–3	—	2–2	3–3	0–1	2–1	0–1	1–1	1–0	1–3	2–0	3–0	3–0	0–2	2–1	0–1	2–0	1–1	4–0	1–1	1–1	0–0	2–0
Bradford City	1–0	0–0	1–1	—	3–1	2–1	3–0	2–1	4–1	2–0	1–2	1–0	2–1	3–1	1–0	2–0	1–0	3–1	1–1	2–1	0–0	1–0	0–1	3–0
Bromley	4–0	2–0	1–1	0–1	—	1–1	3–0	2–2	0–1	1–2	1–0	1–0	2–1	0–2	2–0	1–1	1–0	5–2	2–4	0–0	2–3	1–1	1–2	2–2
Carlisle United	2–1	1–2	1–0	0–1	2–1	—	0–1	0–2	0–0	1–1	0–0	2–3	0–0	2–3	1–1	2–2	0–1	3–2	0–2	3–2	2–2	1–5	1–2	1–1
Cheltenham Town	2–1	0–1	3–2	1–1	1–1	3–2	—	1–0	0–1	2–1	0–2	0–2	1–1	1–1	1–0	0–1	2–0	3–2	3–5	1–1	2–1	2–3	1–0	2–2
Chesterfield	0–3	1–0	1–0	3–3	3–0	2–1	1–1	—	1–1	1–3	5–2	3–0	1–1	2–1	0–0	1–2	4–1	2–1	2–2	1–1	1–1	1–1	3–0	2–2
Colchester United	0–2	1–1	0–0	1–1	1–1	0–0	1–2	1–0	—	0–0	1–1	3–0	2–0	1–2	0–1	2–0	1–0	0–0	1–0	2–1	1–2	4–0	3–0	2–1
Crewe Alexandra	0–1	1–1	3–0	1–1	4–1	3–2	2–3	0–5	0–0	—	1–1	1–4	2–0	2–0	3–0	0–1	1–0	0–3	2–0	0–1	1–1	0–0	3–1	0–1
Doncaster Rovers	4–1	1–1	1–0	2–1	0–1	3–0	2–2	0–3	3–0	1–1	—	2–1	1–0	1–2	1–0	2–1	1–0	3–0	1–1	1–2	1–1	2–2	3–1	2–2
Fleetwood Town	1–1	0–0	0–0	1–0	0–0	1–2	2–0	2–0	0–0	0–1	2–4	—	0–0	1–0	1–1	2–1	2–2	2–0	2–2	1–1	2–2	0–4	0–0	2–0
Gillingham	1–2	1–0	2–0	1–0	0–3	4–1	2–2	1–0	1–1	0–0	0–1	1–2	—	0–1	1–2	1–0	1–0	0–2	1–2	1–0	1–0	1–1	3–0	0–0
Grimsby Town	5–2	0–1	1–2	2–1	1–0	2–1	3–2	1–1	0–1	0–2	0–3	2–1	1–1	—	2–1	1–3	3–1	1–0	0–2	3–0	0–1	0–4	1–1	1–4
Harrogate Town	2–1	0–3	0–1	2–1	0–2	1–0	2–0	2–1	0–0	1–1	2–0	3–1	1–1	2–2	—	1–5	1–2	1–0	1–3	0–1	0–2	1–0	3–2	0–2
Milton Keynes Dons	2–1	0–0	0–3	1–2	0–1	3–0	3–2	3–0	0–1	1–1	1–1	2–4	0–1	0–0	2–1	—	2–1	0–0	0–2	0–1	0–1	3–1	1–1	1–0
Morecambe	2–0	1–0	2–2	1–1	0–2	0–2	2–0	2–5	3–3	0–1	0–1	4–2	0–1	0–3	1–2	1–3	—	0–1	1–1	0–1	1–3	1–0	2–0	0–2
Newport County	3–1	1–2	1–0	0–0	1–1	1–0	0–3	0–3	0–2	2–1	3–1	0–0	3–1	0–0	3–0	6–3	2–1	—	0–2	1–4	3–1	1–2	1–4	0–0
Notts County	2–0	1–0	1–2	3–0	1–1	1–0	1–2	1–2	1–1	0–0	1–2	2–2	0–1	4–1	1–0	3–0	2–0	0–0	—	0–1	1–3	2–0	2–1	1–2
Port Vale	2–1	3–2	0–1	2–0	5–0	0–0	0–0	1–0	1–1	1–1	2–3	3–1	0–1	2–2	0–0	3–0	1–0	3–2	1–0	—	2–1	2–1	0–0	0–1
Salford City	1–2	1–0	3–0	1–2	3–3	0–1	2–1	0–4	4–1	1–1	1–1	0–2	2–2	1–2	2–0	1–0	1–0	1–1	3–0	0–2	—	2–1	2–0	0–2
Swindon Town	0–0	2–1	2–0	5–4	0–1	0–2	3–3	1–0	3–2	0–0	1–2	3–1	1–1	3–1	0–0	0–0	2–3	4–0	1–2	3–3	2–2	—	3–1	0–4
Tranmere Rovers	0–1	0–2	1–1	0–2	2–1	1–0	2–0	4–0	1–3	2–0	0–3	0–0	1–1	0–1	2–1	1–1	2–2	2–1	0–0	1–1	0–0	1–1	—	1–0
Walsall	0–1	1–1	1–0	2–1	2–2	3–1	2–1	3–1	4–0	1–1	2–0	2–6	1–1	1–3	2–2	4–2	1–0	2–0	3–2	2–3	2–2	0–1	5–1	—

Legend: Blue = home team win; Yellow = draw; Red = away team win.
For upcoming matches, an "a" indicates there is an article about the rivalry between the two participants.

=== Bracket ===
Semi-finals
7	Chesterfield	0	1	1
4	Walsall	2	2	4
6	Notts County	0	0	0
5	AFC Wimbledon	1	1	2

Final
4	Walsall	0
5	AFC Wimbledon	1

=== Semi-finals ===
First leg

10 May 2025
20:00 BST

Notts County	0–1	AFC Wimbledon
	Report	Harbottle 59'

Meadow Lane, Nottingham
Attendance: 12,385
Referee: Thomas Kirk
11 May 2025
15:30 BST

Chesterfield	0–2	Walsall
	Report	Allen 28' (pen.); Chang 39'

SMH Group Stadium, Chesterfield
Attendance: 10,001
Referee: Martin Coy

Second leg

16 May 2025
20:00 BST

Walsall	2–1	Chesterfield
Lakin 81'; Amantchi 90+5'	Report	Dobra 90+4'

Bescot Stadium, Walsall
Attendance: 9,585
Referee: Ben Toner

Walsall won 4–1 on aggregate.

17 May 2025
12:30 BST

AFC Wimbledon	1–0	Notts County
Neufville 8'	Report

Plough Lane, Wimbledon
Attendance: 8,501
Referee: Lewis Smith

AFC Wimbledon won 2–0 on aggregate.

=== Final ===
26 May 2025
15:01 BST

AFC Wimbledon	1–0	Walsall
Hippolyte 45+2'	Report

Wembley Stadium, London
Attendance: 50,947
Referee: Will Finnie

== Managerial changes ==
Team	Outgoing manager	Manner of departure	Date of vacancy	Position in table	Incoming manager	Date of appointment	Position in table
Swindon Town	(Wales) Michael Flynn	Mutual consent	15 January 2024	2023–24 English Football League	(Republic of Ireland) Mark Kennedy	29 May 2024	Pre-season
Sunderland	(England) Michael Beale	Sacked	19 February 2024	2023–24 English Football League	(France) Régis Le Bris	22 June 2024	Pre-season
Plymouth Argyle	(England) Ian Foster	Sacked	1 April 2024	2023–24 English Football League	(England) Wayne Rooney	25 May 2024	Pre-season
Stevenage	(Scotland) Steve Evans	Appointed Rotherham United manager	17 April 2024	2023–24 English Football League	(England) Alex Revell	9 May 2024	Pre-season
Barnsley	(Scotland) Neill Collins	Sacked	22 April 2024	2023–24 English Football League	(England) Darrell Clarke	23 May 2024	Pre-season
Gillingham	(England) Stephen Clemence	Sacked	29 April 2024	Pre-season	(England) Mark Bonner	7 May 2024	Pre-season
Morecambe	(England) Ged Brannan	Appointed Accrington Stanley assistant manager	30 April 2024	Pre-season	(Scotland) Derek Adams	3 June 2024	Pre-season
Hull City	(England) Liam Rosenior	Sacked	7 May 2024	Pre-season	(Germany) Tim Walter	31 May 2024	Pre-season
Huddersfield Town	(Germany) André Breitenreiter	Mutual consent	10 May 2024	Pre-season	(Northern Ireland) Michael Duff	13 May 2024	Pre-season
Norwich City	(United States) David Wagner	Sacked	17 May 2024	Pre-season	(Denmark) Johannes Hoff Thorup	30 May 2024	Pre-season
Birmingham City	(England) Tony Mowbray	Resigned	21 May 2024	Pre-season	(Wales) Chris Davies	6 June 2024	Pre-season
Cheltenham Town	(England) Darrell Clarke	Appointed Barnsley manager	23 May 2024	Pre-season	(Wales) Michael Flynn	31 May 2024	Pre-season
Barrow	(England) Pete Wild	Mutual consent	24 May 2024	Pre-season	(England) Stephen Clemence	31 May 2024	Pre-season
Burnley	(Belgium) Vincent Kompany	Appointed Bayern Munich manager	29 May 2024	Pre-season	(England) Scott Parker	5 July 2024	Pre-season
Burton Albion	(Northern Ireland) Martin Paterson	Mutual consent	31 May 2024	Pre-season	(England) Mark Robinson	4 June 2024	Pre-season
Newport County	(Republic of Ireland) Graham Coughlan	Sacked	20 June 2024	Pre-season	(Portugal) Nelson Jardim	16 July 2024	Pre-season
Preston North End	(England) Ryan Lowe	Resigned	12 August 2024	22nd	(England) Paul Heckingbottom	20 August 2024	23rd
Blackpool	(England) Neil Critchley	Sacked	21 August 2024	23rd	(England) Steve Bruce	3 September 2024	23rd
Carlisle United	(England) Paul Simpson	Sacked	31 August 2024	20th	(England) Mike Williamson	19 September 2024	23rd
Stoke City	(England) Steven Schumacher	Sacked	16 September 2024	13th	(Spain) Narcís Pèlach	18 September 2024	13th
Milton Keynes Dons	(England) Mike Williamson	Appointed Carlisle United manager	19 September 2024	20th	(England) Scott Lindsey	25 September 2024	19th
Cardiff City	(Turkey) Erol Bulut	Sacked	22 September 2024	24th	(Turkey) Omer Riza	22 September 2024	20th
Crawley Town	(England) Scott Lindsey	Appointed Milton Keynes Dons manager	25 September 2024	18th	(Republic of Ireland) Rob Elliot	1 October 2024	22nd
Burton Albion	(England) Mark Robinson	Sacked	23 October 2024	24th	(England) Gary Bowyer	18 December 2024	23rd
Swindon Town	(Republic of Ireland) Mark Kennedy	Sacked	25 October 2024	22nd	(England) Ian Holloway	25 October 2024	22nd
Shrewsbury Town	(England) Paul Hurst	Sacked	3 November 2024	23rd	(England) Gareth Ainsworth	13 November 2024	24th
Coventry City	(England) Mark Robins	Sacked	7 November 2024	17th	(England) Frank Lampard	28 November 2024	17th
Hull City	(Germany) Tim Walter	Sacked	27 November 2024	22nd	(Spain) Rubén Sellés	6 December 2024	22nd
Northampton Town	(Australia) Jon Brady	Resigned	5 December 2024	21st	(England) Kevin Nolan	23 December 2024	20th
Reading	(Spain) Rubén Sellés	Appointed Hull City manager	6 December 2024	6th	(Republic of Ireland) Noel Hunt	6 December 2024	6th
Millwall	(England) Neil Harris	Mutual consent	10 December 2024	13th	(Scotland) Alex Neil	30 December 2024	13th
Oxford United	(England) Des Buckingham	Sacked	15 December 2024	20th	(England) Gary Rowett	20 December 2024	20th
Bristol Rovers	(England) Matt Taylor	Sacked	16 December 2024	20th	(Spain) Iñigo Calderón	26 December 2024	19th
Fleetwood Town	(Scotland) Charlie Adam	Sacked	22 December 2024	18th	(England) Pete Wild	24 December 2024	18th
West Bromwich Albion	(Spain) Carlos Corberán	Appointed Valencia manager	25 December 2024	7th	(England) Tony Mowbray	17 January 2025	7th
Stoke City	(Spain) Narcís Pèlach	Sacked	27 December 2024	19th	(England) Mark Robins	1 January 2025	18th
Plymouth Argyle	(England) Wayne Rooney	Mutual consent	31 December 2024	24th	(Austria) Miron Muslic	10 January 2025	24th
Gillingham	(England) Mark Bonner	Sacked	5 January 2025	14th	(England) John Coleman	5 January 2025	14th
Luton Town	(Wales) Rob Edwards	Mutual consent	9 January 2025	20th	(England) Matt Bloomfield	14 January 2025	20th
Wycombe Wanderers	(England) Matt Bloomfield	Appointed Luton Town Manager	14 January 2025	2nd	(England) Mike Dodds	2 February 2025	2nd
Barrow	(England) Stephen Clemence	Sacked	18 January 2025	17th	(England) Andy Whing	20 January 2025	17th
Bolton Wanderers	(England) Ian Evatt	Mutual consent	22 January 2025	9th	(England) Steven Schumacher	30 January 2025	7th
Carlisle United	(England) Mike Williamson	Sacked	3 February 2025	24th	(Wales) Mark Hughes	6 February 2025	24th
Derby County	(England) Paul Warne	Sacked	7 February 2025	22nd	(England) John Eustace	13 February 2025	21st
Blackburn Rovers	(England) John Eustace	Appointed Derby County Manager	13 February 2025	5th	(France) Valérien Ismaël	25 February 2025	6th
Cambridge United	(England) Garry Monk	Sacked	16 February 2025	24th	(England) Neil Harris	19 February 2025	24th
Swansea City	(England) Luke Williams	Sacked	17 February 2025	17th	(Republic of Ireland) Alan Sheehan	17 February 2025	17th
Tranmere Rovers	(England) Nigel Adkins	Mutual agreement	26 February 2025	22nd	(England) Andy Crosby	26 February 2025	22nd
Wigan Athletic	(Scotland) Shaun Maloney	Sacked	2 March 2025	15th	(England) Ryan Lowe	12 March 2025	15th
Milton Keynes Dons	(England) Scott Lindsey	Sacked	2 March 2025	17th	(England) Paul Warne	15 April 2025	19th
Huddersfield Town	(Northern Ireland) Michael Duff	Sacked	9 March 2025	7th	(England) Lee Grant	28 May 2025	10th
Barnsley	(England) Darrell Clarke	Sacked	12 March 2025	10th	(Republic of Ireland) Conor Hourihane	18 April 2025	10th
Crawley Town	(Republic of Ireland) Rob Elliot	Sacked	19 March 2025	22nd	(England) Scott Lindsey	21 March 2025	22nd
Gillingham	(England) John Coleman	Sacked	25 March 2025	19th	(England) Gareth Ainsworth	25 March 2025	19th
Shrewsbury Town	(England) Gareth Ainsworth	Appointed Gillingham Manager	25 March 2025	24th	(England) Michael Appleton	26 March 2025	24th
Rotherham United	(Scotland) Steve Evans	Sacked	30 March 2025	16th	(England) Matt Hamshaw	30 March 2025	16th
Cardiff City	(Turkey) Omer Riza	Sacked	19 April 2025	23rd	(Republic of Ireland) Brian Barry-Murphy	16 June 2025	24th
West Bromwich Albion	(England) Tony Mowbray	Sacked	21 April 2025	10th	(England) Ryan Mason	2 June 2025	9th
Norwich City	(Denmark) Johannes Hoff Thorup	Sacked	22 April 2025	14th	(England) Liam Manning	3 June 2025	13th
Newport County	(Portugal) Nelson Jardim	Mutual consent	24 April 2025	20th	(Wales) David Hughes	23 May 2025	22nd
