= Lewis Leigh =

Lewis Leigh may refer to:

- Lewis Leigh (footballer) (born 2003), English footballer
- Lewis Leigh (content creator), Welsh social media personality
- Zebulon Lewis Leigh (1906–1996), known as Lewie, Canadian aviator

== See also ==
- Sir Leigh Lewis (born 1951) , British civil servant
