= Lewis Leigh (content creator) =

Welsh social media personality

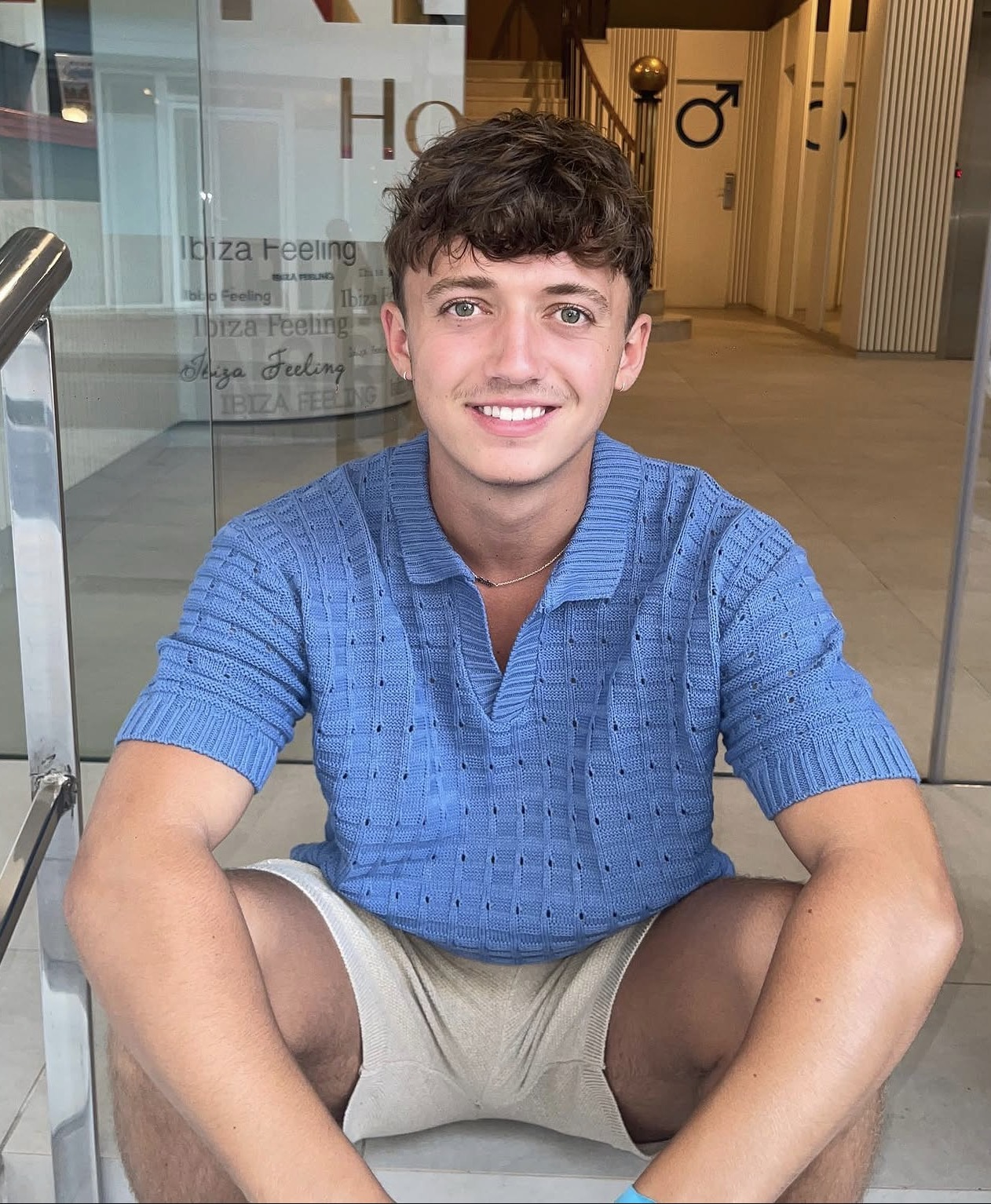
- Lewis Leigh in Ibiza, 2024
- Born: Merthyr Tydfil, Wales
- Occupation: Social media personality
- Known for: TikTok videos with his grandmother; Only Nans campaign

Lewis Leigh is a Welsh social media personality from Merthyr Tydfil, South Wales. He became known for short-form videos on TikTok during the COVID-19 lockdowns, particularly videos featuring members of his family, including his grandmother.

== Career ==
Leigh began posting videos online before the COVID-19 pandemic, and gained wider attention during lockdown through dance and comedy videos made with his grandmother. ITV News reported in 2021 that videos featuring Leigh and his grandmother had received more than 12 million views.

In 2022, BBC News included Leigh in a report about Welsh young people building careers through social media platforms.

WalesOnline reported in 2022 that Leigh was involved in an online safety campaign with Ofcom aimed at encouraging young people to report harmful content.

In 2023, WalesOnline reported that Leigh took part in a Cancer Research Wales campaign.

In 2022, Leigh participated in an Ofcom online safety campaign encouraging young people to report harmful online content.

In November 2025, Leigh attended a reception at Cyfarthfa Castle in Merthyr Tydfil marking the bicentenary of the castle and the 77th birthday of Charles III. He was named among the invited guests in national press coverage, and photographs published at the time showed him meeting the King.

== Personal life ==
Leigh is from Merthyr Tydfil in South Wales.
