= Cambridgeshire derby =

Football club rivalry in England

- Location: Cambridgeshire
- Teams: Cambridge United; Peterborough United
- First meeting: Cambridge 1–5 Peterborough (22 March 1956); Hunt's Premier Cup
- Latest meeting: Cambridge 0–1 Peterborough (15 March 2025); 2024–25 EFL League One
- Stadiums: Abbey Stadium (Cambridge United); London Road (Peterborough United)

Statistics
- Total meetings: Total: 56; League: 36
- Most wins: Total: Peterborough (28); League: Peterborough: 14
- All-time record: Peterborough: 28; Draw: 13; Cambridge United: 16

The Cambridgeshire derby is a sobriquet used to describe football matches held in the East of England between Cambridge United and Peterborough United, the only fully professional football clubs in Cambridgeshire. Both the clubs are 37 miles (59 kilometres) apart.

The first derby took place on 22 March 1956 and has since been played 54 competitive matches with Peterborough winning 25 to Cambridge United's 16. Both clubs have played two friendlies and one memorial match.

Fans of both clubs consider each as one of their main rivals. In the 2003 Football Fans Census, the Cambridgeshire derby was listed one of the 23 requited rivalries in English football.

== History ==
Chart of yearly table positions for Cambridge United and Peterborough United in the Football League

The first league meeting between Peterborough United and Cambridge United took place in Fourth Division on 10 October 1970 at Abbey Stadium. The match ended in a 1–1 draw, but Cambridge would be the first of the two clubs to taste derby victory - in the reverse fixture - winning 3–2 away at Peterborough's London Road, later the same season.

Following Cambridge's relegation after the 2001-02 Second Division, the sides would not face each other in a competitive fixture for nearly 16 years.

In August 2015, a memorial match was played between the two teams in honour of Chris Turner who had died four months earlier. Turner, who was born in Cambridgeshire, made 314 league appearances for Peterborough and 90 for Cambridge United before going on to manage both clubs. In September 2017, a statue of Turner was unveiled outside London Road.

The drought of competitive derbies ended with an EFL Trophy match played in Cambridge on 7 November 2017. Before the game, a smoke grenade was set off in a pub near Abbey Stadium. The pub was evacuated but reopened 85 minutes later with no injuries reported. Cambridge's 2020 victory on penalties in the EFL Trophy group stage was their first over Peterborough in any competition since 1998, in what was the Football League Third Division.

Since Peterborough's relegation following the 2021–22 season, both clubs now compete in EFL League One. The most recent derby took place on 15 March 2025 with Peterborough winning 0-1.

== Head-to-head ==
=== Statistics ===
As of 15 March 2024

Major Competitions
Competition	Played	Cambridge wins	Draws	Peterborough wins	Cambridge goals	Peterborough goals
League	36	11	9	16	42	55
FA Cup	2	1	0	1	2	2
Football League Trophy	10	3	2	5	13	15
Total	47	15	11	21	57	71
Minor/Regional Competitions
Cambridgeshire Pro Cup	1	0	0	1	2	4
Hunts' Premier Cup	4	1	1	2	5	8
Shipp Cup	3	0	1	2	4	6
Total	8	1	2	5	11	18
Friendly/Memorial Match
Friendly	2	0	1	1	6	9
Memorial Match	1	0	1	0	0	0
Total	3	0	2	1	6	9
Overall Total	59	16	15	28	74	99

=== League ===
#	Season	Date	Competition	Home Team	Result	Away Team	Stadium	Att.	H2H
1	1970–71	10 October 1970	Division 4	Cambridge	1–1	Peterborough	Abbey Stadium	7,575	0
2	1970–71	17 April 1971	Division 4	Peterborough	2–3	Cambridge	London Road	5,068	+1
3	1971–72	9 March 1972	Division 4	Peterborough	2–0	Cambridge	London Road	4,947	0
4	1971–72	19 April 1972	Division 4	Cambridge	2–5	Peterborough	Abbey Stadium	4,248	+1
5	1972–73	23 September 1972	Division 4	Cambridge	3–1	Peterborough	Abbey Stadium	4,378	0
6	1972–73	26 December 1972	Division 4	Peterborough	1–1	Cambridge	London Road	7,290	0
7	1977–78	5 November 1977	Division 3	Peterborough	2–0	Cambridge	London Road	7,308	+1
8	1977–78	2 January 1973	Division 3	Cambridge	1–0	Peterborough	Abbey Stadium	10,998	0
9	1985–86	26 October 1985	Division 4	Cambridge	3–1	Peterborough	Abbey Stadium	3,234	+1
10	1985–86	22 March 1986	Division 4	Peterborough	0–0	Cambridge	London Road	2,984	+1
11	1986–87	22 November 1986	Division 4	Cambridge	1–1	Peterborough	Abbey Stadium	3,498	+1
12	1986–87	4 April 1987	Division 4	Peterborough	2–1	Cambridge	London Road	4,713	0
13	1987–88	28 August 1987	Division 4	Peterborough	1–0	Cambridge	London Road	4,623	+1
14	1987–88	1 January 1988	Division 4	Cambridge	1–3	Peterborough	Abbey Stadium	3,975	+2
15	1988–89	3 January 1989	Division 4	Peterborough	1–5	Cambridge	London Road	4,662	+1
16	1988–89	25 March 1989	Division 4	Cambridge	2–1	Peterborough	Abbey Stadium	4,215	0
17	1989–90	17 December 1989	Division 4	Cambridge	3–2	Peterborough	Abbey Stadium	4,811	+1
18	1989–90	21 April 1990	Division 4	Peterborough	1–2	Cambridge	London Road	9,257	+2
19	1992–93	16 March 1993	Division 1	Cambridge	2–2	Peterborough	Abbey Stadium	8,077	+2
20	1992–93	10 April 1993	Division 1	Peterborough	1–0	Cambridge	London Road	10,235	+1
21	1994–95	21 December 1994	Division 2	Peterborough	2–2	Cambridge	London Road	7,412	+1
22	1994–95	8 April 1995	Division 2	Cambridge	2–0	Peterborough	Abbey Stadium	5,828	+2
23	1997–98	2 December 1997	Division 3	Peterborough	1–0	Cambridge	London Road	10,791	+1
24	1997–98	11 April 1998	Division 3	Cambridge	1–0	Peterborough	Abbey Stadium	5,445	+2
25	1998–99	10 November 1998	Division 3	Peterborough	2–1	Cambridge	London Road	10,168	+1
26	1998–99	24 April 1999	Division 3	Cambridge	1–1	Peterborough	Abbey Stadium	8,307	+1
27	2000–01	15 December 2000	Division 2	Cambridge	0–0	Peterborough	Abbey Stadium	7,505	+1
28	2000–01	31 March 2001	Division 2	Peterborough	4–1	Cambridge	London Road	10,086	0
29	2001–02	8 September 2001	Division 2	Peterborough	1–0	Cambridge	London Road	8,656	+1
30	2001–02	29 December 2001	Division 2	Cambridge	0–0	Peterborough	Abbey Stadium	5,665	+1
31	2022–23	29 October 2022	League One	Peterborough	1–0	Cambridge	London Road	12,766	+2
32	2022–23	15 April 2023	League One	Cambridge	2–0	Peterborough	Abbey Stadium	7,711	+1
33	2023–24	11 November 2023	League One	Peterborough	5–0	Cambridge	London Road	11,645	+2
34	2023–24	24 February 2024	League One	Cambridge	0–1	Peterborough	Abbey Stadium	7,710	+3
35	2024–25	9 November 2024	League One	Peterborough	6-1	Cambridge	London Road	12,370	+4
36	2024–25	15 March 2025	League One	Cambridge	0-1	Peterborough	Abbey Stadium	7,359	+5

=== Cup ===
#	Season	Date	Competition	Round	Home Team	Result	Away Team	Stadium	Att.
1	1955–56	22 March 1956	Hunts' Premier Cup	First round	Cambridge	1–5	Peterborough	Abbey Stadium	–
2	1959–60	5 November 1959	Hunts' Premier Cup	Semi-finals	Peterborough	1–1	Cambridge	London Road	3,632
3	1959–60	19 April 1959	Hunts' Premier Cup	Semi-finals replay	Cambridge	2–0	Peterborough	Abbey Stadium	2,600
4	1969–70	5 November 1969	Hunts' Premier Cup	Final	Cambridge	1–2	Peterborough	Abbey Stadium	–
5	1975–76	9 August 1975	Shipp Cup	Group stages	Peterborough	3–3	Cambridge	London Road	2,000
6	1976–77	4 July 1976	Shipp Cup	Group stages	Peterborough	1–0	Cambridge	London Road	3,443
7	1977–78	5 August 1977	Shipp Cup	Group stages	Peterborough	2–1	Cambridge	London Road	1,877
8	1980–81	6 August 1980	Cambridgeshire Pro. Cup	–	Cambridge	2–4	Peterborough	Abbey Stadium	–
9	1984–85	17 November 1984	FA Cup	First round	Cambridge	0–2	Peterborough	Abbey Stadium	5,641
10	1984–85	23 January 1985	EFL Trophy	First round (1st leg)	Peterborough	2–1	Cambridge	London Road	2,095
11	1984–85	5 February 1985	EFL Trophy	First round (2nd leg)	Cambridge	2–0	Peterborough	Abbey Stadium	1,740
12	1985–86	21 January 1986	EFL Trophy	Group stage	Cambridge	4–1	Peterborough	Abbey Stadium	2,253
13	1987–88	1 December 1987	EFL Trophy	Group stage	Peterborough	3–0	Cambridge	London Road	1,247
14	1988–89	29 November 1988	EFL Trophy	Group stage	Cambridge	2–2	Peterborough	Abbey Stadium	1,296
15	1990–91	6 November 1990	EFL Trophy	Group stage	Peterborough	0–2	Cambridge	London Road	3,279
16	1994–95	3 December 1994	FA Cup	Second round	Peterborough	0–2	Cambridge	London Road	9,576
17	2017–18	7 November 2017	EFL Trophy	Group stage	Cambridge	0–2	Peterborough	Abbey Stadium	3,138
18	2019–20	12 November 2019	EFL Trophy	Group stage	Peterborough	2–1	Cambridge	London Road	3,425
19	2020–21	10 November 2020	EFL Trophy	Group stage	Cambridge	1–1 (Note: Cambridge United won 3–1 on penalty shoot-out.)	Peterborough	Abbey Stadium	0 (Note: Played behind closed doors due to COVID-19 pandemic.)
20	2023–24	12 September 2023	EFL Trophy	Group stage	Peterborough	2–0	Cambridge	London Road	3,687

== Records ==
- Friendly matches are not included in the following records unless otherwise noted.

=== Results ===
==== Biggest wins (5+ goals) ====
Winning margin	Result	Date	Competition
5	Peterborough 5–0 Cambridge	11 November 2023	2023–24 League One
5	Peterborough 6–1 Cambridge	9 November 2024	2024–25 League One

==== Most total goals in a match ====
Goals	Result	Date	Competition
7	Cambridge 2–5 Peterborough	19 April 1972	1971–72 Fourth Division
6	Cambridge 1–5 Peterborough	22 March 1956	1955–56 Hunts' Premier Cup
6	Peterborough 3–3 Cambridge	9 August 1975	1975–76 Shipp Cup
6	Cambridge 2–4 Peterborough	6 August 1980	1980–81 Cambridgeshire Professional Cup
6	Peterborough 1–5 Cambridge	3 January 1989	1988–89 Fourth Division
5	Peterborough 2–3 Cambridge	17 April 1971	1970–71 Fourth Division
5	Cambridge 4–1 Peterborough	21 January 1986	1985–86 EFL Trophy
5	Cambridge 3–2 Peterborough	17 December 1989	1989–90 Fourth Division
5	Peterborough 4–1 Cambridge	31 March 2001	2000–01 Second Division
5	Peterborough 5–0 Cambridge	11 November 2023	2023–24 League One
7	Peterborough 6–1 Cambridge	9 November 2024	2024–25 League One

==== Longest runs ====
===== Most consecutive wins =====
Games	Club	Period
5	Cambridge	3 January 1989 – 6 November 1990
5	Peterborough	12 September 2023 – Present

===== Most consecutive draws =====
Games	Period
3	24 April 1999 – 15 December 2000

===== Most consecutive matches without a draw =====
Games	Period
10	4 July 1976 – 21 January 1986

===== Longest undefeated runs =====
Games	Club	Period
12	Peterborough	10 November 1998 – 29 October 2022

===== Most consecutive matches without conceding a goal =====
Games	Club	Period
4	Peterborough	8 September 2001 – 7 November 2011
3	Peterborough	12 September 2023 – 24 February 2024

===== Most consecutive games scoring =====
Games	Club	Period
12	Peterborough	2 February 1963 – 5 November 1977
8	Cambridge	1 January 1988 – 16 March 1993
7	Cambridge	22 March 1956 – 17 April 1971
