= Nene derby =

English association football rivalry

- Location: East of England; East Midlands
- Teams: Northampton Town; Peterborough United
- First meeting: Peterborough 2–3 Northampton (29 September 1936); 1936–37 Maunsell Cup
- Latest meeting: Northampton 1–1 Peterborough (28 February 2026); 2025–26 EFL League One
- Next meeting: Tbc
- Stadiums: Sixfields Stadium (Northampton Town); London Road (Peterborough United)

Statistics
- Total meetings: Total: 108; Official: 82
- Most wins: Total: Peterborough (49); Official: Peterborough (38)
- Most player appearances: Official: Tommy Robson (18); Overall: Tommy Robson (22)
- Top scorer: Official: Jim Hall (8); Overall: Jim Hall (9)
- All-time record: Total: Peterborough: 49; Draw: 25; Northampton: 33; Official: Peterborough: 38; Draw: 19; Northampton: 24

The Nene derby is the name of the association football local rivalry in England between Northampton Town and Peterborough United, both of which are based along the River Nene. Fans of both clubs consider the other to be one of their main rivals. In a 2019 study the Nene derby was revealed to be a reciprocated rivalry, with the largest percentage of fans of each club considering the other as their rivals.

The first competitive match between the two clubs took place in 1946 but the first professional derby took place in 1960. As of 17 December 2024, there have been 80 competitive matches between the two teams, with 37 wins for Peterborough, 24 wins for Northampton and 19 draws.

The derby has never been played higher than the third tier of English football with 58 league matches, 7 FA Cup matches, 5 League Cup matches and 6 EFL Trophy matches. The most recent game took place in League One and resulted in a 4-0 win for Northampton at London Road .

In total, the derby has been played 105 times, including minor/regional league and cup games, with 15 Maunsell Cup matches (5 times in the final), 11 Northants Senior Cup matches (5 times in the final) and 1 London Midweek League match. They have also played 6 friendlies.

Northampton play their home games at Sixfields Stadium, while Peterborough play at London Road Stadium. The two stadiums are approximately 37 miles (60 km) apart.

== History ==
=== Early matches ===
The first match between two clubs took place in the final of 1936–37 Maunsell Cup at London Road and ended in a 3–2 away victory for Northampton Town. The first official competitive game took place in the second round of 1946–47 FA Cup at London Road and ended in a 1–1 draw, forcing a replay at Northampton Town's County Ground which also ended in another 1-1 draw. The second replay was played on a neutral venue at Highfield Road, Coventry, where Northampton won 8–1 and this victory still stands as the largest victory and the highest scoring match in the history of the derby.

Peterborough United won the Midland Football League five times in a row between 1956 and 1960 before being accepted into the Football League ahead of the 1960–61 season. First ever derby was played in the league for the first time in that season, with the first game ending in a 3–3 draw and the return fixture ending in a 0–3 win for Peterborough. Both teams were promoted to the Third Division as Peterborough won the league and Northampton finished third. Both teams played in the Third Division for the next two seasons before Northampton were promoted as champions in 1962–63 season.

The two teams did not play each other in the league again until the 1967–68 Third Division after Northampton's run in the second and first tier.

=== 1980s ===
Peterborough were relegated into the Fourth Division ahead of the 1979–80 season. Both teams played in the Fourth Division for eight consecutive seasons until Northampton were promoted as champions in the 1986–87 season. The derby was also played twice in the FA Cup and twice in the League Cup during this period, bringing the total to twenty matches in eight years. The biggest victory over this period was a 6–0 home victory for Peterborough on 24 April 1984. Northampton recorded a 0–5 away victory on 12 October 1985.

=== Recent years ===
Comparative chart of the Nene Derby contestants in the Football League.

In the 2019–20 season, Peterborough finished seventh in League One whilst Northampton won the League Two play-offs, meaning that the Nene derby returned for the 2020-21 League One season. Following Northampton's promotion, Peterborough United chairman, Darragh MacAnthony congratulated them and referred to the derby as "The one real 'local' rivalry I've experienced in 15 years at Posh." The first derby of the season was played two days after the death of Tommy Robson, Peterborough's record appearance maker who started his career with Northampton, and was played behind closed doors due to COVID-19 restrictions. Peterborough won the match 0–2 with goals scored by Nathan Thompson and Reece Brown. The second league derby of the season was originally scheduled to take place on Saturday 17 April 2021, however, all English football matches on that day were rescheduled as a mark of respect for the funeral of Prince Philip.

== Rivalry ==
While the proximity of the clubs was the main root of the rivalry between Northampton Town and Peterborough United, other events have fueled the division. Most notable among these are the violent confrontations between fans, famously the "Battle of Abington Park" in April 1974 when approximately 500 fans clashed before, during and after a derby. An eyewitness was quoted as saying "It was like a battle scene from a film where everyone converged to carry out personal duels. I have never seen anything like it." Some of the evidence presented in the court case that followed included "Sticks with nails embedded in the end, part of a brick, broken bottles, a large beer can and a pint mug."

Aside from fan violence, animosity has arisen over transfers between the clubs with Northampton fans accusing Peterborough of poaching players. It has been said that "Northampton fans have never forgiven Peterborough for taking star strikers Tony Adcock and Bobby Barnes when the Cobblers were cash strapped." This, however, has not stopped players from crossing the divide. Gabriel Zakuani, for example, signed for Northampton in 2016 after making 252 appearances for Peterborough.

== List of derbies ==
=== League ===
No.	Season	Date	Competition	Stadium	Home team	Result	Away team	Att.	H2H
1	1960–61	8 October 1960	Division 4	London Road	Peterborough	3–3	Northampton	22,959	0
2	1960–61	25 February 1961	Division 4	County Ground	Northampton	0–3	Peterborough	19,516	+1
3	1961–62	28 October 1961	Division 3	County Ground	Northampton	2–2	Peterborough	17,324	+1
4	1961–62	17 March 1962	Division 3	London Road	Peterborough	0–2	Northampton	17,009	0
5	1962–63	1 September 1962	Division 3	County Ground	Northampton	2–3	Peterborough	16,064	+1
6	1962–63	11 May 1963	Division 3	London Road	Peterborough	0–4	Northampton	17,518	0
7	1967–68	23 April 1968	Division 3	County Ground	Northampton	3–1	Peterborough	8,934	+1
8	1967–68	4 May 1968	Division 3	London Road	Peterborough	4–0	Northampton	6,658	0
9	1969–70	17 September 1969	Division 4	London Road	Peterborough	1–0	Northampton	8,557	+1
10	1969–70	14 April 1970	Division 4	County Ground	Northampton	2–2	Peterborough	6,732	+1
11	1970–71	10 November 1970	Division 4	County Ground	Northampton	2–0	Peterborough	8,190	0
12	1970–71	20 February 1971	Division 4	London Road	Peterborough	1–0	Northampton	8,068	+1
13	1971–72	5 February 1972	Division 4	County Ground	Northampton	1–1	Peterborough	5,186	+1
14	1971–72	8 April 1972	Division 4	London Road	Peterborough	1–0	Northampton	5,480	+2
15	1972–73	28 August 1972	Division 4	London Road	Peterborough	2–3	Northampton	3,627	+1
16	1972–73	28 April 1973	Division 4	County Ground	Northampton	1–3	Peterborough	2,441	+2
17	1973–74	17 November 1973	Division 4	London Road	Peterborough	3–0	Northampton	10,351	+3
18	1973–74	12 April 1974	Division 4	County Ground	Northampton	0–1	Peterborough	11,378	+4
19	1976–77	2 November 1976	Division 3	County Ground	Northampton	2–2	Peterborough	7,483	+4
20	1976–77	12 April 1977	Division 3	London Road	Peterborough	3–1	Northampton	8,944	+5
21	1979–80	22 September 1979	Division 4	County Ground	Northampton	1–0	Peterborough	3,678	+4
22	1979–80	9 February 1980	Division 4	London Road	Peterborough	0–0	Northampton	4,960	+4
23	1980–81	26 December 1980	Division 4	London Road	Peterborough	3–0	Northampton	6,265	+5
24	1980–81	21 April 1981	Division 4	County Ground	Northampton	2–2	Peterborough	3,800	+5
25	1981–82	28 November 1981	Division 4	London Road	Peterborough	1–0	Northampton	5,293	+6
26	1981–82	24 April 1982	Division 4	County Ground	Northampton	1–0	Peterborough	4,975	+5
27	1982–83	30 October 1982	Division 4	County Ground	Northampton	0–0	Peterborough	3,284	+5
28	1982–83	12 March 1983	Division 4	London Road	Peterborough	2–0	Northampton	3,778	+6
29	1983–84	27 December 1983	Division 4	County Ground	Northampton	2–1	Peterborough	6,464	+5
30	1983–84	24 April 1984	Division 4	London Road	Peterborough	6–0	Northampton	3,481	+6
31	1984–85	26 December 1984	Division 4	County Ground	Northampton	0–3	Peterborough	4,350	+7
32	1984–85	2 April 1985	Division 4	London Road	Peterborough	0–0	Northampton	2,482	+7
33	1985–86	12 October 1985	Division 4	London Road	Peterborough	0–5	Northampton	3,866	+6
34	1985–86	15 March 1986	Division 4	County Ground	Northampton	2–2	Peterborough	3,332	+6
35	1986–87	14 September 1986	Division 4	County Ground	Northampton	2–1	Peterborough	5,517	+5
36	1986–87	31 January 1987	Division 4	London Road	Peterborough	0–1	Northampton	7,911	+4
37	1990–91	22 September 1990	Division 4	County Ground	Northampton	1–2	Peterborough	5,572	+5
38	1990–91	5 February 1991	Division 4	London Road	Peterborough	1–0	Northampton	5,932	+6
39	1999–2000	14 August 1999	Division 3	Sixfields Stadium	Northampton	0–1	Peterborough	6,253	+7
40	1999–2000	15 January 2000	Division 3	London Road	Peterborough	1–0	Northampton	9,104	+8
41	2000–01	23 December 2000	Division 2	London Road	Peterborough	1–2	Northampton	9,868	+7
42	2000–01	27 January 2001	Division 2	Sixfields Stadium	Northampton	0–0	Peterborough	7,079	+7
43	2001–02	7 October 2001	Division 2	London Road	Peterborough	2–0	Northampton	8,101	+8
44	2001–02	19 February 2002	Division 2	Sixfields Stadium	Northampton	2–1	Peterborough	6,064	+7
45	2002–03	28 December 2002	Division 2	London Road	Peterborough	0–0	Northampton	7,767	+7
46	2002–03	25 January 2003	Division 2	Sixfields Stadium	Northampton	0–1	Peterborough	5,906	+8
47	2005–06	21 December 2005	League Two	Sixfields Stadium	Northampton	0–1	Peterborough	7,023	+9
48	2005–06	1 April 2006	League Two	London Road	Peterborough	0–1	Northampton	8,637	+8
49	2008–09	13 September 2008	League One	Sixfields Stadium	Northampton	1–1	Peterborough	6,520	+8
50	2008–09	14 March 2009	League One	London Road	Peterborough	1–0	Northampton	8,881	+9
51	2016–17	18 October 2016	League One	London Road	Peterborough	3–0	Northampton	9,172	+10
52	2016–17	19 November 2016	League One	Sixfields Stadium	Northampton	0–1	Peterborough	7,675	+11
53	2017–18	26 August 2017	League One	Sixfields Stadium	Northampton	1–4	Peterborough	6,685	+12
54	2017–18	2 April 2018	League One	London Road	Peterborough	2–0	Northampton	8,619	+13
55	2020–21	10 October 2020	League One	Sixfields Stadium	Northampton	0–2	Peterborough	0 (Note: Played behind closed doors COVID-19 pandemic.)	+14
56	2020–21	16 April 2021	League One	London Road	Peterborough	3–1	Northampton	0 (Note: Played behind closed doors COVID-19 pandemic.)	+15
57	2023–24	19 August 2023	League One	Sixfields Stadium	Northampton	1–0	Peterborough	7,684	+14
58	2023–24	5 March 2024	League One	London Road	Peterborough	5–1	Northampton	9,028	+15
59	2024–25	9 December 2024	League One	Sixfields Stadium	Northampton	2–1	Peterborough	7,098	+14
60	2024–25	5 April 2025	League One	London Road	Peterborough	0–4	Northampton	9,782	+13
61	2025–26	13 December 2025	League One	London Road	Peterborough	2–1	Northampton	9,260	+14
62	2025–26	28 February 2026	League One	Sixfields Stadium	Northampton	1–1	Peterborough	7,637	+14

=== Cup ===
No.	Season	Date	Competition	Round	Stadium	Home team	Result	Away team	Att.	H2H
1	1946–47	14 December 1946	FA Cup	Second round	London Road	Peterborough	1–1	Northampton	7,793	0
2	1946–47	19 December 1946	FA Cup	Second round replay	County Ground	Northampton	1–1	Peterborough	6,800	0
3	1946–47	23 December 1946	FA Cup	Second round 2nd replay	Highfield Road	Peterborough	1–8	Northampton	3,618	+1
4	1966–67	14 September 1966	League Cup	Second round	County Ground	Northampton	2–2	Peterborough	5,778	+1
5	1966–67	26 September 1966	League Cup	Second round replay	London Road	Peterborough	0–2	Northampton	9,484	+2
6	1967–68	23 August 1967	League Cup	First round	London Road	Peterborough	2–3	Northampton	8,157	+3
7	1972–73	18 November 1972	FA Cup	First round	London Road	Peterborough	1–0	Northampton	7,815	+2
8	1980–81	22 November 1980	FA Cup	First round	County Ground	Northampton	1–4	Peterborough	5,542	+1
9	1982–83	21 August 1982	EFL Trophy	Group stage	London Road	Peterborough	5–2	Northampton	2,197	0
10	1985–86	21 August 1985	League Cup	First round 1st leg	London Road	Peterborough	0–0	Northampton	3,117	0
11	1985–86	3 September 1985	League Cup	First round 2nd leg	County Ground	Northampton	2–0	Peterborough	2,464	+1
12	1986–87	16 November 1986	FA Cup	First round	County Ground	Northampton	3–0	Peterborough	9,114	+2
13	1988–89	21 December 1988	EFL Trophy	Group stage	London Road	Peterborough	0–2	Northampton	1,754	+3
14	1994–95	12 November 1994	FA Cup	First round	London Road	Peterborough	4–0	Northampton	8,739	+2
15	1995–96	16 October 1995	EFL Trophy	Group stage	London Road	Peterborough	0–0	Northampton	3,045	+2
16	1997–98	27 January 1998	EFL Trophy	Quarter-finals	London Road	Peterborough	2–1	Northampton	5,516	+1
17	2003–04	9 December 2003	EFL Trophy	Quarter-finals	Sixfields Stadium	Northampton	2–1 (Note: Match went to extra-time.)	Peterborough	4,290	+2
18	2017–18	3 November 2017	EFL Trophy	Group stage	London Road	Peterborough	1–1	Northampton	2,745	+2
19	2019–20	3 September 2019	EFL Trophy	Group stage	Sixfields Stadium	Northampton	0–2	Peterborough	2,234	+1
20	2024–25	17 December 2024	EFL Trophy	Round of 32	London Road	Peterborough	3–0	Northampton	2,549	0

== Minor/Regional tournaments ==
No.	Season	Date	Competition	Round	Stadium	Home team	Result	Away team	Att.
1	1936–37	29 April 1937	Maunsell Cup	Final	London Road	Peterborough	2–3	Northampton	2,996
2	1937–38	28 April 1938	Maunsell Cup	Final	London Road	Peterborough	0–4	Northampton	2,394
3	1938–39	17 April 1939	Maunsell Cup	Semi-finals	County Ground	Northampton	3–1	Peterborough	393
4	1947–48	12 April 1948	Maunsell Cup	Semi-final	London Road	Peterborough	5–1	Northampton	7,606
5	1948–49	4 April 1948	Maunsell Cup	Final	London Road	Peterborough	0–0	Northampton	–
6	1948–49	21 April 1949	Maunsell Cup	Final replay	County Ground	Northampton	2–1	Peterborough	1,504
7	1949–50	17 April 1950	Maunsell Cup	–	County Ground	Northampton	0–0	Peterborough	3,000
8	1952–53	1 May 1953	Maunsell Cup	Final	London Road	Peterborough	1–2	Northampton	8,753
9	1953–54	29 April 1954	Maunsell Cup	Final	London Road	Peterborough	2–1	Northampton	9,776
10	1954–55	21 April 1955	Maunsell Cup		London Road	Peterborough	1–0	Northampton	8,784
11	1956–57	15 April 1957	Maunsell Cup	Semi-finals	London Road	Peterborough	3–1	Northampton	7,975
12	1959–60	1 October 1959	Maunsell Cup	–	County Ground	Northampton	1–0	Peterborough	1,686
13	1960–61	1 May 1960	Northants Senior Cup	Final	London Road	Peterborough	4–1	Northampton	10,470
14	1961–62	9 April 1962	Northants Senior Cup	Final	London Road	Peterborough	3–1	Northampton	4,991
15	1962–63	29 April 1963	Northants Senior Cup	Semi-final	County Ground	Northampton	2–0	Peterborough	–
16	1963–64	27 April 1964	Northants Senior Cup	Final	London Road	Peterborough	0–0	Northampton	–
17	1964–65	31 March 1965	Northants Senior Cup	Semi-finals	County Ground	Northampton	0–2	Peterborough	3,370
18	1965–66	23 May 1965	Northants Senior Cup	–	London Road	Peterborough	0–1	Northampton	–
19	1967–68	29 April 1968	Northants Senior Cup	Final	County Ground	Northampton	0–2	Peterborough	–
20	1970–71	25 August 1980	Northants Senior Cup	–	County Ground	Northampton	2–2	Peterborough	–
21	1973–74	26 February 1974	Northants Senior Cup	Semi-finals	County Ground	Northampton	2–2	Peterborough	–
22	1973–74	11 March 1974	Northants Senior Cup	Semi-finals replay	London Road	Peterborough	2–0	Northampton	7,683
23	1974–75	3 February 1975	Northants Senior Cup	Final	County Ground	Northampton	1–0	Peterborough	–
24	1977–78	17 October 1977	Maunsell Cup	Final	London Road	Peterborough	3–1	Northampton	995
25	1978–79	30 October 1978	Maunsell Cup	–	London Road	Peterborough	4–1	Northampton	–
26	1979–80	14 November 1979	Maunsell Cup	–	London Road	Peterborough	1–1	Northampton	–

== Statistics ==
As of 28 February 2026.

Competition	Played	Northampton wins	Draws	Peterborough wins	Northampton goals	Peterborough goals
Major Competitions
League	62	17	14	31	62	93
FA Cup	7	2	2	3	14	12
League Cup	5	3	2	0	9	4
EFL Trophy	8	2	2	4	8	14
Total	82	24	20	38	93	123
Minor/Regional Competitions
Maunsell Cup	15	6	3	6	21	24
Northants Cup	11	3	3	5	10	17
Total	26	9	6	11	31	41
Overall Total	108	33	26	49	124	164

=== Top goal-scorers ===
Official major competitions
As of 5 March 2024. Only goals scored in official major competitions.

Rank	Player	Club(s)	Years	League	FA Cup	League Cup	EFL Trophy	Overall
1	(England) Jim Hall	Northampton/Peterborough	1963–1967 (N); 1967–1975 (P); 1965–1978 (N)	7	1	0	0	8
2	(Scotland) Peter McNamee	Peterborough	1955–1965	5	0	0	0	5
2	(England) Tommy Robson	Northampton/Peterborough	1961–1966 (N); 1969–1981 (P)	3	2	0	0	5
2	(England) Ian Benjamin	Peterborough/Northampton	1982–1984 (P); 1984–1987 (N)	2	1	0	2	5
2	(Scotland) Archie Garrett	Northampton	1946–1947	0	5	0	0	5
6	(England) (Saint Vincent and the Grenadines) Errington Kelly	Peterborough	1984–1986; 1987–1988	4	0	0	0	4
6	(England) John Cozens	Peterborough	1973–1978	4	0	0	0	4
6	(England) John Fairbrother	Peterborough/Northampton	1965–1968 (P); 1968–1971 (N)	3	0	1	0	4
6	(England) Phil Chard	Peterborough/Northampton	1978–1985 (P); 1985–1988 (N); 1989–1994 (N)	2	0	1	1	4

=== Most appearances ===
As of 28 February 2026.

Official Apps.
Rank	Player	Club	Apps
1	(England) Tommy Robson	Northampton; Peterborough	18
2	(England) Phil Chard	Peterborough; Northampton	15
3	(England) Jim Hall	Northampton; Peterborough	14
3	(England) Wakeley Gage	Northampton; Peterborough	14
5	(England) Ian Benjamin	Peterborough; Northampton	13
5	(England) Peter Gleasure	Northampton	13
5	(England) Sam Hoskins	Northampton	13
8	(England) Graham Felton	Northampton	12
8	(England) Trevor Quow	Peterborough; Northampton	12
8	(England) Trevor Slack	Peterborough; Northampton	12

Including Minor & Regional Apps.
Rank	Player	Club	Apps
1	(England) Tommy Robson	Northampton; Peterborough	22
2	(England) Phil Chard	Peterborough; Northampton	15
2	(England) Jim Hall	Northampton; Peterborough	15
4	(England) Wakeley Gage	Northampton; Peterborough	14
5	(England) Ian Benjamin	Peterborough; Northampton	13
5	(England) Peter Gleasure	Northampton	13
5	(England) Sam Hoskins	Northampton	13
8	(England) Graham Felton	Northampton	12
8	(England) Trevor Quow	Peterborough; Northampton	12
8	(England) Trevor Slack	Peterborough; Northampton	12

=== Hat-tricks ===
Player	For	Score	Date	Competition	Stadium	Ref.
(Scotland) Archie Garrett^{4}	Northampton	1–8 (N)	23 December 1946	1946–47 FA Cup	Highfield Road	
(England) Colin Garwood	Peterborough	4–0 (H)	4 May 1968	1967–68 Third Division	London Road	

Notes

- ^{4} = 4 goals scored; (H) = Home, (A) = Away, (N) = Neutral location

== Records ==
- Friendly matches are not included in the following records unless otherwise noted.

=== Results ===
==== Biggest wins (5+ goals) ====
Winning margin	Result	Date	Competition
7	Peterborough 1–8 Northampton	23 December 1946	1946–47 FA Cup
6	Peterborough 6–0 Northampton	24 April 1983	1983–84 Fourth Division
5	Peterborough 0–5 Northampton	12 October 1985	1985–86 Fourth Division

==== Most total goals in a match ====
Goals	Result	Date	Competition
9	Peterborough 1–8 Northampton	23 December 1946	1946–47 FA Cup
7	Peterborough 5–2 Northampton	21 August 1982	1982–83 EFL Trophy
6	Peterborough 4–2 Northampton	12 January 1939	1938–39 London Midweek League
6	Peterborough 5–1 Northampton	12 April 1948	1947–48 Maunsell Cup
6	Peterborough 3–3 Northampton	8 August 1960	1960–61 Fourth Division
6	Peterborough 6–0 Northampton	24 April 1984	1983–84 Fourth Division
6	Peterborough 5–1 Northampton	5 March 2024	2023–24 League One

==== Longest runs ====
===== Most consecutive wins =====
Games	Club	Period
4	Northampton	14 September 1986 – 21 December 1988
4	Peterborough	14 March 2009 – 26 August 2017
4	Peterborough	2 April 2018 – 16 April 2021

===== Most consecutive draws =====
Games	Period
2	14 December 1946 – 19 December 1946
2	14 April 1970 – 25 August 1970
2	14 November 1979 – 9 February 1980
2	2 April 1985 – 21 August 1985

===== Most consecutive matches without a draw =====
Games	Period
7	21 April 1949 – 1 October 1959
7	14 September 1986 – 12 November 1994

===== Longest undefeated runs =====
Games	Club	Period
9	Peterborough	14 March 2009 – 16 April 2021
7	Northampton	3 September 1985 – 21 December 1988
7	Peterborough	22 September 1990 – 15 January 2000

===== Most consecutive matches without conceding a goal =====
Games	Club	Period
4	Peterborough	24 April 1984 – 21 August 1985

===== Most consecutive games scoring =====
Games	Club	Period
10	Peterborough	20 February 1971 – 12 April 1974
10	Peterborough	13 September 2008 – 16 April 2021
8	Northampton	3 September 1985 – 22 September 1990
