= AFC Wimbledon–Milton Keynes Dons F.C. rivalry =

English football rivalry

AFC Wimbledon v Milton Keynes Dons
- Other names: Dons derby
- Teams: AFC Wimbledon; Milton Keynes Dons
- First meeting: 2 December 2012; Milton Keynes Dons 2–1 AFC Wimbledon; FA Cup second round
- Latest meeting: 17 September 2026; AFC Wimbledon 0–0 Milton Keynes Dons; League One
- Next meeting: 17 April 2027; Milton Keynes Dons v AFC Wimbledon; League One
- Stadiums: Plough Lane (AFC Wimbledon, from November 2020); Kingsmeadow (AFC Wimbledon, until November 2020); Stadium MK (Milton Keynes Dons)

Statistics
- Total meetings: 19
- Most wins: Milton Keynes Dons (9)
- Most player appearances: Dean Lewington (11)
- Top scorer: Benik Afobe, Matt O'Riley, Daniel Powell, Callum Maycock (2)
- Postseason results: AFC Wimbledon: 5 Drawn: 6 Milton Keynes Dons: 9
- Largest victory: AFC Wimbledon 3–0 Milton Keynes Dons (14 September 2024)

The rivalry between AFC Wimbledon and Milton Keynes Dons arose from the formation of both clubs following the controversial relocation of Wimbledon F.C. to Milton Keynes.

For many years the two clubs played at different levels of English football, with the first competitive fixture between them taking place on 2 December 2012 – a second round FA Cup meeting in which the two clubs were drawn against one another, resulting in Milton Keynes Dons defeating AFC Wimbledon 2–1.

Following AFC Wimbledon's promotion to the Football League, fixtures between the two clubs have taken place regularly. The rivalry was named as one of "5 of the fiercest rivalries in the Football League" and one of the "8 biggest derbies in the EFL" by commentators. A 2019 study ranked the rivalry 22nd out of the top 30 derbies in all of English football. The fixture has been labelled "one of football's biggest grudge games".

== History ==
=== Origins ===
Wimbledon Football Club relocated to Milton Keynes in September 2003, 16 months after receiving permission to do so from the Football Association on the basis of a two-to-one decision in favour by an FA-appointed independent three man commission. The move took the team from south London, where they had been based since their foundation in 1889, to Milton Keynes, a new city in Buckinghamshire, about 56 miles (90 km) to the northwest of the club's traditional home town Wimbledon. Hugely controversial, the move's authorisation prompted disaffected Wimbledon supporters to form AFC Wimbledon, a new club, in June 2002. The relocated team played home matches in Milton Keynes under the Wimbledon name from September 2003 until June 2004, when following the end of the 2003–04 season they renamed themselves Milton Keynes Dons F.C. (MK Dons).

=== First encounter ===
"Some months ago I went to the directors of the Dons Trust, the parent board of the club. I said, 'Some day we will be drawn away to Milton Keynes. What do you want to do?'

After a long discussion by the owners, they decided they would not accept hospitality on the day of the game. They instructed the football club board not to go too. The fans are deciding they don't want us to go into the boardroom. Therefore, there will be no hand to shake."

— Erik Samuelson, AFC Wimbledon chief executive, November 2012

On 14 November 2012, the two clubs were drawn to play against each other for the first time in a second round FA Cup tie which would take place on 2 December 2012. At the time, MK Dons were an established League One club, and AFC Wimbledon a League Two club having achieved promotion from the Conference National in 2011. MK Dons were drawn as the home team, with the fixture being played at the club's home ground of Stadium MK. The tie was accompanied by worldwide press attention and was selected for live coverage by television networks around the world as well as being chosen for broadcast by ITV domestically in the UK.

Wimbledon Independent Supporters Association, representing fans of AFC Wimbledon, initially considered encouraging their supporters to boycott the fixture, but later released a statement suggesting individual supporters made an "informed decision" as to whether they attended or not. AFC Wimbledon chief executive Erik Samuelson stated that following discussions with the club's owners, board members would not accept hospitality at Stadium MK on the day of the fixture.

A crowd of 16,459 including several thousand AFC Wimbledon supporters eventually attended the match. The first half saw little action, but on the stroke of half-time it was the home side that took the lead with a 25-yard strike from midfielder Stephen Gleeson.

After the break, chances for both sides followed. On the 59th-minute, AFC Wimbledon equalised through striker Jack Midson's header, and almost took the lead themselves when Steven Gregory's shot produced a save from MK Dons' goalkeeper David Martin. The match ended in dramatic fashion when on the 93rd-minute, substitute Jon Otsemobor was struck by the ball on the back of his boot, resulting in a last gasp 2–1 victory for Milton Keynes Dons. Supporters of the club later dubbed the freak goal the "Heel of God".

=== Notable subsequent encounters ===
The first encounter between the two clubs to take place at AFC Wimbledon's (then) home ground of Kingsmeadow took place on 14 March 2017. The fixture was a League One match between the two that took place during the 2016–17 season as a result of AFC Wimbledon's promotion from League Two the previous season. This was the first season in which the two clubs would meet at the same level of the English football league system. The match was played in front of a heated atmosphere between both groups of fans. Following a stalemate in the first half, AFC Wimbledon midfielder Jake Reeves struck just after the hour mark before striker Lyle Taylor added a second soon after to seal the victory. The match ended 2–0 to the home side.

On 30 January 2021 the first fixture between the two clubs at AFC Wimbledon's new Plough Lane stadium took place, albeit without spectators in attendance due to the COVID-19 pandemic. Milton Keynes Dons emerged from the encounter as 2–0 winners.

In the first contest between the two clubs in front of fans at Plough Lane on 2 March 2024, AFC Wimbledon secured a 1–0 victory following a last-gasp goal from Ronan Curtis in the final minute of added time. Tempers flared at the final whistle with staff and players from both clubs having to be separated by the referee.

The first encounter between the two clubs' Women's teams took place at Prince George's Fields on 13 October 2024, as part of the FA Women's National League South where AFC Wimbledon won 5–0.

=== Controversies and incidents ===
Chart of English Football League performance of MK Dons and AFC Wimbledon since the 2004–05 season

Due to the rivalry between the two clubs, there have been a number of controversies and incidents over the years, both on and off the pitch.

During the first fixture between the two clubs at Stadium MK on 2 December 2012, a small plane chartered by AFC Wimbledon supporters flew over the stadium several times flying a banner which read "We are Wimbledon". Following the fixture, a local newspaper reported that visiting AFC Wimbledon supporters were responsible for damage caused to "seating, toilet and refreshment facilities" within the stadium.

There were security concerns ahead of the first fixture to take place between the two clubs at AFC Wimbledon's (then) home ground of Kingsmeadow on 14 March 2017. Due to the street layout surrounding the venue there were safety concerns that groups of opposing supports would clash. Only 650 tickets were allocated to visiting fans. Following consultation between the police and the two clubs it was agreed the match would be designated as a "bubble fixture" with visiting MK Dons supporters only allowed to travel to the match via mandatory coach travel arranged by the club. On arrival, visiting supporters were then escorted to the ground by police. A similar arrangement remained in place for every subsequent fixture between the two clubs at Kingsmeadow.

On 20 December 2017, AFC Wimbledon were charged by the EFL with an alleged breach of league regulations following their home encounter with Milton Keynes Dons on 22 September 2017. The alleged breach related to the club not referring to Milton Keynes Dons by their full name on Kingsmeadow's electronic scoreboard throughout the tie as well as failing include their name on the cover of the matchday programme and only referring to them as "MK" or "Milton Keynes".

In April 2018, the EFL reported that there was facilitating mediation between the two clubs in an attempt to reach an amicable agreement in relation to the clubs' relationship towards one another. On 10 July 2019, a further statement revealed mediation talks were still ongoing but that a temporary agreement for AFC Wimbledon to treat MK Dons' club name in an equal manner to any other visiting club, in relation to the matchday programme and scoreboard, had been reached.

On 22 March 2024, following AFC Wimbledon's 1–0 home win over MK Dons on 2 March 2024, AFC Wimbledon player Harry Pell was issued a one-match ban and fined £1,000 by the FA after admitting kicking balls at MK Dons supporters, including an 11 year-old girl, during the pre-match warm-up. The independent Regulatory Commission also concluded that it found AFC Wimbledon players "largely, if not solely to blame for events after the final whistle" in which several players caused a melee by goading travelling fans.

== Players for both clubs ==
No footballer has played for both clubs on a permanent basis. The following footballers have played for both clubs, although all have been loan signings for one or both clubs. AFC Wimbledon have a standing policy that it will not sign a player from, pay a fee that benefits, or appoint anyone who has managed or run football, at MK Dons.

AFC Wimbledon, then Milton Keynes Dons

Name	Pos.	AFC Wimbledon	Milton Keynes Dons	Ref.
(England) Brennan Dickenson	MF	2013 (loan)	2019–2020	
(England) Tennai Watson	DF	2018–2019 (loan)	2021–2023	
(England) Henry Lawrence	DF	2021–2022 (loan)	2022–2023 (loan)	
(England) Paris Maghoma	MF	2022–2023 (loan)	2023 (loan)	
(Wales) Connor Lemonheigh-Evans	MF	2023–2024 (loan)	2024–2026	
(England) Connal Trueman	GK	2020–2021 (loan)	2025–	

Milton Keynes Dons, then AFC Wimbledon

Name	Pos.	Milton Keynes Dons	AFC Wimbledon	Ref.
(England) Drewe Broughton	FW	2007–2008	2011 (loan)	
(England) Danilo Orsi	FW	2025 (loan)	2025–2026	

== Footballers who previously played for Wimbledon ==
The following players played for the original Wimbledon club, and later played for either AFC Wimbledon or Milton Keynes Dons. The majority of players who have played for both Wimbledon FC and Milton Keynes Dons were members of the team at the time of the relocation.

Wimbledon and AFC Wimbledon

Name	Pos.	Wimbledon	AFC Wimbledon	Ref.
(England) Roger Joseph	DF	1988–1996	2003; 2004–2005	
(England) Jermaine Darlington	DF	2002–2004	2006–2007	
(England) Michael Gordon	MF	2001–2004	2006–2007	
(Jamaica) Marcus Gayle	FW	1994–2001	2007–2008	
(Jamaica) Jason Euell	FW	1995–2001	2012	
(Scotland) Neil Sullivan	GK	1986–2000	2012	
(Republic of Ireland) David Connolly	FW	2001–2003	2015	

Wimbledon and Milton Keynes Dons

Name	Pos.	Wimbledon	Milton Keynes Dons	Ref.
(England) Dean Lewington	DF	2002–2004	2004–2025	
(England) Paul Heald	GK	1995–2004	2004–2005	
(Scotland) Jamie Mackie	FW	2003–2004	2004–2005	
(France) Harry Ntimban-Zeh	DF	2004	2004–2005	
(Northern Ireland) Mark Williams	DF	2000–2002; 2004	2004–2005	
(Sierra Leone) Malvin Kamara	MF	2003–2004	2004–2006	
(England) Nick McKoy	MF	2003–2004	2004–2006	
(England) Wade Small	FW	2003–2004	2004–2006	
(England) Alex Tapp	MF	2002–2004	2004–2006	
(England) Ben Chorley	DF	2003–2004	2004–2007	
(England) Ben Harding	MF	2003–2004	2004–2007	
(England) Gary Smith	MF	2004	2004–2007	
(Sierra Leone) Albert Jarrett	FW	2003–2004	2007	
(England) Jason Puncheon	MF	2003–2004	2004–2006; 2008–2010	
(England) David Martin	GK	2003–2004	2004–2006; 2010–2017	
(England) Nigel Reo-Coker	MF	2002–2004	2018	

== Statistics ==
All figures are correct as of 17 September 2026.

=== Head-to-head results ===
Competition	Played	AFC Wimbledon wins	Drawn	Milton Keynes Dons wins	AFC Wimbledon goals	Milton Keynes Dons goals
Football League	14	3	5	6	10	13
FA Cup	2	1	0	1	3	2
Football League Cup	2	0	0	2	3	5
Football League Trophy	1	1	0	0	3	2
Total	19	5	5	9	19	22

=== Records ===
- First competitive meeting: Milton Keynes Dons 2–1 AFC Wimbledon – FA Cup second round, 2 December 2012
- First EFL Cup/League Cup meeting: Milton Keynes Dons 3–1 AFC Wimbledon – First round, 12 August 2014
- First EFL Trophy/League Trophy meeting: Milton Keynes Dons 2–3 AFC Wimbledon – Second round, 7 October 2014
- First FA Cup meeting: Milton Keynes Dons 2–1 AFC Wimbledon – Second round, 2 December 2012
- First league meeting: Milton Keynes Dons 1–0 AFC Wimbledon – League One, 10 December 2016
- First away victory:
  - AFC Wimbledon: Milton Keynes Dons 2–3 AFC Wimbledon – League Trophy second round, 7 October 2014
  - Milton Keynes Dons: AFC Wimbledon 0–2 Milton Keynes Dons – League One, 22 September 2017
- Highest scoring game: Milton Keynes Dons 2–3 AFC Wimbledon – League Trophy second round, 7 October 2014
- Largest winning margin:
  - AFC Wimbledon: 3–0 – League Two, 14 September 2024
  - Milton Keynes Dons: 3–1 – League Two, 23 January 2024, 3–1 – League Cup first round, 12 August 2014
- Most consecutive wins:
  - AFC Wimbledon: 3
  - Milton Keynes Dons: 2
- Longest undefeated run:
  - AFC Wimbledon: 5 (2 March 2024 – present; 3 wins and 2 draw)
  - Milton Keynes Dons: 9 (22 September 2017 – 2 March 2024; 6 wins and 3 draws)
- Most consecutive draws: 1
- Most meetings in a season: 3 – 2024–25 season
- Most goals: 2 – Callum Maycock (AFC Wimbledon), Benik Afobe (Milton Keynes Dons), Matt O'Riley (Milton Keynes Dons) and Daniel Powell (Milton Keynes Dons)
- Most appearances: 11 – Dean Lewington (Milton Keynes Dons)
- Highest league attendance: 16,459 at Stadium MK, FA Cup second round, 2 December 2012

== See also ==
- Major football rivalries
- South London derby
- List of sports rivalries in the United Kingdom
