= Bloomfield Road =

Football stadium in Blackpool, England

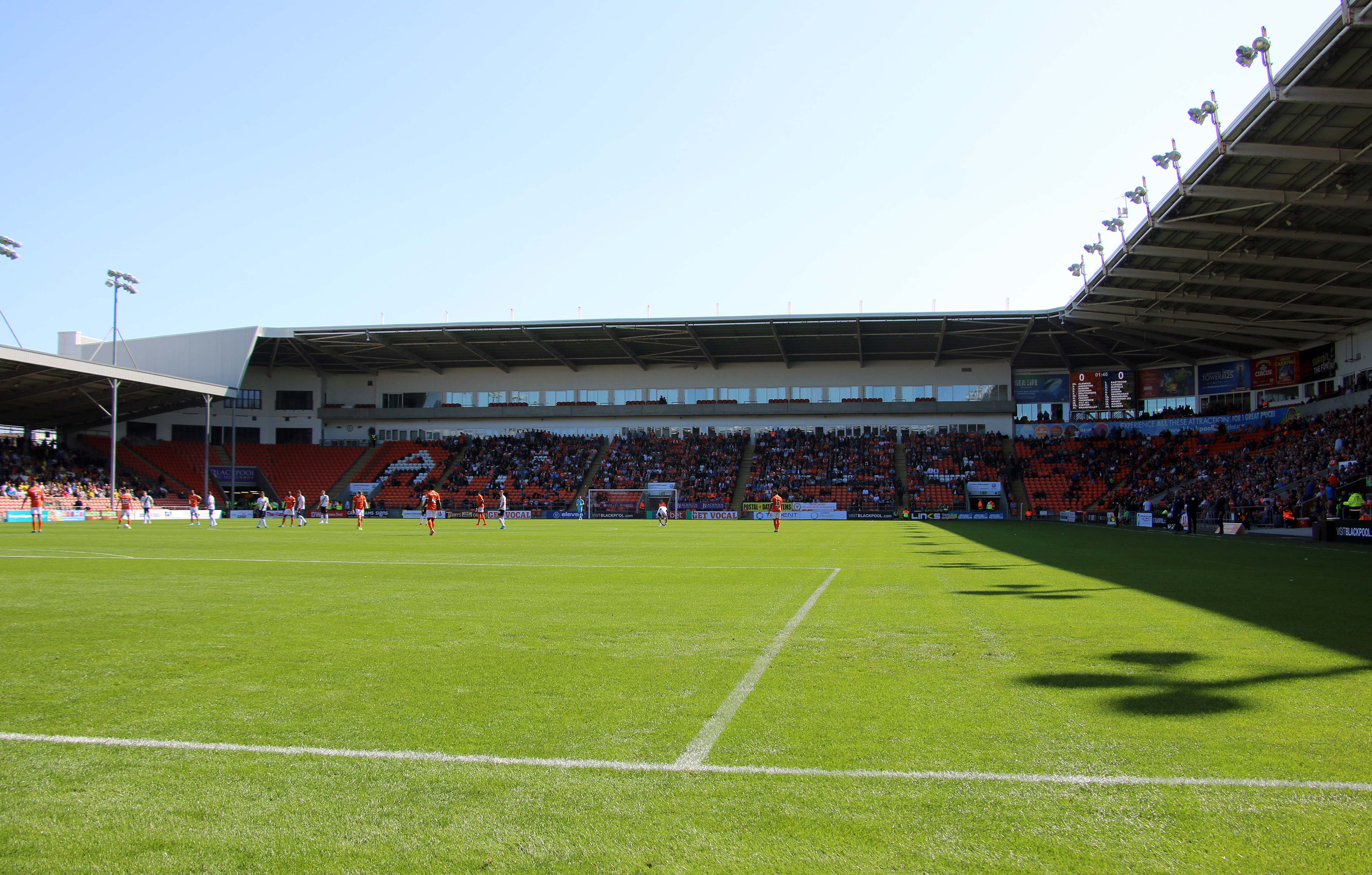
- A view of the East, South and West (Main) stands in 2019

- Location in Blackpool
- Full name: Bloomfield Road Stadium
- Former names: Gamble's Field (1887–1899)
- Location: Seasiders Way; Blackpool; FY1 6JJ
- Coordinates: 53°48′17″N 3°2′53″W
- Owner: Rose 123 Investments Ltd.
- Capacity: c. 16,500
- Executive suites: 12+
- Surface: Grass
- Scoreboard: Yes
- Record attendance: 38,098 (1955; pre-redevelopment); 16,116 (2010; during redevelopment)
- Field size: 112 x 74 yards (102.4 x 67.7 metres)
- Public transit: Blackpool Transport bus routes 5, 5A, 5B, 11 and 11A; Stagecoach bus route 68; Blackpool South National Rail station

Construction
- Opened: 28 October 1899
- Renovated: 1999–2002 (North and West Stands); 2003 (East Stand); 2009–2010 (South Stand); 2010 (East Stand); 2011–2012 (South East Corner Stand)
- Architects: TTH Architects, Gateshead, UK

Tenants
- South Shore F.C. (1899); Blackpool F.C. (1900, 1901–present); Blackpool Borough (1987); Blackpool Panthers (2004–2006)

Bloomfield Road is a football stadium in Blackpool, Lancashire, England, which has been the home of Blackpool Football Club since 1901. It is the third stadium since the club's founding, the previous two being Raikes Hall Gardens and the Athletic Grounds.

Largely unchanged since the 1960s, the stadium began a redevelopment phase in the early 2000s. A temporary East Stand was erected before the start of the 2010–11 season, the club's debut in the Premier League. It is still in place today. The three permanent stands are named the Stan Mortensen North Stand (denoted by the acronym "B.F.C." spelled out in white seats, the Jimmy Armfield South Stand (with "ARMFIELD" spelled out in white seats) and the Sir Stanley Matthews West Stand (with one of the club's nicknames, "SEASIDERS", spelled out in white seats).

The record attendance at Bloomfield Road is 38,098, when Blackpool played Wolverhampton Wanderers on 17 September 1955.

The stadium hosted three matches of the 2005 UEFA Women's Championship. It has also been the venue for the final of the Northern Rail Cup, a rugby league tournament.

== History ==
Before moving to Bloomfield Road, Blackpool had called two other grounds home during their short existence. Firstly, between 1896 and 1897, they played their fifteen home Football League matches at Raikes Hall Gardens (also known as the Pleasure Gardens). In 1897, they moved to the Athletic Grounds at the present-day Stanley Park, which hosted thirty-two League matches over two seasons. After a short spell back at Raikes Hall Gardens in 1899, during their season out of the League, and again for all but the first home game of the 1900–01 campaign, Blackpool made the permanent move to Bloomfield Road.

The ground was originally known as Gamble's Field, so named for the farmer who owned the land, when South Shore played there in the Lancashire League in 1899.

The first competitive game played at the ground took place on 21 October 1899, when South Shore played the 1st South Lancashire Regiment. A comment at the time was: "The new ground was not quite finished on Saturday and the linesman had plenty to do besides watching the game to keep the spectators from getting over the line. The grandstand was not up, but it is expected to be ready for next Saturday. A bar is going to be erected and two dressing tents." The official opening of the ground did indeed occur on 28 October 1899, when South Shore entertained Newton Heath in an FA Cup tie.

When Blackpool merged with South Shore in December 1899, the former club moved into the latter's ground and changed the name to Bloomfield Road. Additionally, the two clubs amalgamated with the Lancashire League fixtures of Blackpool, because they were deemed easier than those of South Shore.

The first game after the merger took place on 23 December. Horwich R.M.I., with only ten men in their line-up, were the visitors. Blackpool won 8–0. The ground, at this time, had a small wooden grandstand along the western side of the pitch, which seated about three hundred spectators. A perimeter fence ran around the rest of the pitch to keep supporters off the playing surface. Walking to the game would have been very different from today. Coming from the south, supporters would have had to navigate their way through row after row of allotments along Central Drive from Waterloo Road. All behind the west side of the ground were railway sidings and tracks. Henry Street was only partially built up, and behind the north end of the ground lay open space and the town's waste disposer and the corporation stables.

After this match, Blackpool returned to play at their Raikes Hall ground, where the Christmas Day game against Oswaldtwistle Rovers resulted in a "better attendance than ever". Raikes Hall was used for the season's remaining home games, and it was not until a practice match on 25 August 1900 that the club, then back in the Second Division, returned to Bloomfield Road.

At this time there was only one stand at the ground, a small structure on the western side, which held about 300 seated. Gainsborough Trinity were the first visitors to Bloomfield Road for a Football League game. On 8 September 1900, they drew 1–1 with the Seasiders, in front of what was a "good" attendance of "just under 2,000". It was noted that the ground "conveyed the impression that at some remote period of its history it had been a ploughed field".

Once again, Blackpool returned to playing their home games at Raikes Hall for the remainder of the season. "We shall not easily forget Saturday's match, or rather, to be more accurate, the conditions under which it was played", one critic said. "Unfortunately for the club, the game had to be played at Bloomfield Road, and if there is one ground in this town unsuitable for the purpose for which it is used, this is surely the one. It is out of the way, all the players and most of the committee and the spectators declared that it was impossible to play on such a pitch; and the provision for the Press was absolutely nil." In addition, commenting on the attendance, it was thought that "the figure would have been nearly double had Raikes been available".

The only reason that the opening fixture was played at Bloomfield Road is that, with it being the tail end of the summer season, Raikes Hall Pleasure Gardens were still being used to entertain the public and as such the football field was unavailable. In fact, it had been agreed pre-season that Raikes Hall would be permanently used as the home ground, but that "as soon as certain improvements are completed, a move will be made to the South Shore ground". These improvements were not made to the satisfaction of the club, and they remained at Raikes Hall.

It was not until the start of the 1901–02 season that Bloomfield Road became the permanent home of Blackpool Football Club. The club won its first League game at Bloomfield Road on 12 October 1901, defeating Doncaster Rovers 3–1.

In 1906, the local Press were pleading with the club to provide a decent Press box, as they found themselves watching the games from the touchline. The following year, a paddock was built in front of the stand to up the capacity. A decade later, however, a serious fire all but destroyed it, necessitating a complete rebuild. Two years later, the Spion Kop, the former South Stand, was built, holding about 1,000 standing spectators. Along the east side of the ground, the concreted East Paddock was built, costing roughly £3,000, which nearly bankrupted the club but raised the ground to have a capacity of 18,000.

Also in 1906, a 2,000-capacity stand was constructed on the north side of the ground. This new stand was named the Motor Stand and made Bloomfield Road one of the few grounds in England to have stands on all four sides of the ground. Partly erected, it was opened for the first time on 10 November for the visit of West Bromwich Albion. The club organist a whist drive at the Conservative Club to help defray the expense. The stand was borrowed from the Blackpool Corporation and practically filled the north side of the ground. It was purchased from the council in June 1908 at a cost of £100.

On 13 January 1917, a fire in the West Stand, likely caused by the dressing-room heating system, badly damaged the structure. When the fire brigade arrived, the stand was a blazing inferno with a northerly wind causing the flames to completely destroy the entire southern end, including both the original secretary's office, the boardroom, including club records, many silver cups and a collection of historical photographs that adorned the office. It resulted in a rebuilding programme that eventually saw the ground constructed along the lines that remained for the rest of the century.

In 1925, a new South Stand was built to provide a new boardroom, offices, dressing rooms, baths and refreshment bars. It cost just over £13,000 and held 4,000 people, bringing the total ground capacity to well over 20,000. Also this year, a new directors' box was built in the North-West Corner of the ground. It was used for the first time for the visit of Southampton on 29 August 1925. Ernest Lawson commented in the Gazette & Herald: "It's a nice box they have placed themselves in; it must be for safety, for it is far enough out of the way! But of what are they frightened?" He offered an answer at a later date: "The Let Me Smoke railway stokers are a choking nuisance. Now we know from what the directors are protecting themselves." He was referring to the smoke that regularly drifted in at the north-west corner of the ground, caused by passing steam trains. Lawson added: "The crowd do, however, have the last laugh when the wind comes in from the east!"

An England v. Ireland amateur international was staged at the ground on 12 November 1927.

For the opening game of the 1929–30 campaign, a visit of Millwall Athletic on 31 August, the new West Stand was opened for the first time. Eventually, the playing surface was extended by twenty yards to the north to make room for a paddock in front of the South Stand.

Also in 1929, Eli Percival, a general dealer whose business was based on Elizabeth Street, gifted the club the oak panelling that lined the walls of the Bloomfield Road boardroom until 2003. The wood had been salvaged from the wreckage of Horatio Nelson's one-time flagship HMS Foudroyant, which was wrecked near the Metropole Hotel on 16 June 1897.

With promotion to the First Division in 1930 the locals raised some money to build a massive terrace at the north (Tower) end of the ground which could hold around 12,000 standing spectators, increasing the ground's total capacity to over 30,000. The original hill was constructed largely out of cinders and sand and packed together with railway sleepers to hold the extra spectators. The stand was opened for the visit of eventual champions Arsenal on 30 August 1930, and a record 28,723 paid £1,896 to watch the proceedings. The Gunners also helped set the record twice in the two seasons that followed: 29,576 in 1930–31 and 30,218 in 1931–32. The stand had the club's name painted on its rear. The Motor Stand, which had previously occupied the spot, was moved into the North-West Corner, where it stayed until 1985. The East Stand (or "Scratching Sheds") was covered once the team's fortunes increased.

On 17 October 1932, the only full international game took place at Bloomfield Road: England v. Ireland. The attendance was 23,000.

FK Austria Wien were the first continental side to visit Bloomfield Road. The friendly, which took place on 9 December 1935, attracted a crowd of over 5,000. The hosts won 4–3.

On 11 January 1936, Blackpool hosted Margate in the FA Cup in what is believed to be the first game captured on film at Bloomfield Road. The tie, which Blackpool won 3–1, was filmed by the Tower Company and was later shown at the Winter Gardens and Grand Theatre.

On 12 May 1937, Bloomfield Road hosted a series of events as part of the coronation of George VI and Elizabeth. The day started at 09:45 with a parade of all the children taking part, followed by a civic ceremony by the mayor. A display of national dances in costume took place before the ensemble Grand Finale Parade. A thousand children from the junior schools of Blackpool formed a living Union Jack on the pitch during the national anthem.

Lancashire rivals Burnley travelled to Bloomfield Road on 2 December 1944 to contest a Football League North fixture during World War II. The programme noted that the ground had been loaned "by kind permission" of Air Commodore A. Macgregor. The Royal Air Force had requisitioned the ground for the war years, as they had done previously during World War I. Blackpool's considerable debts were virtually cleared by the time the hostilities ended. The visitors won 2–0.

On 18 October 1950, Bloomfield Road hosted a Football League versus Irish League exhibition match. Liverpool's centre-forward Albert Stubbins netted five times in the Football League's 6–3 victory.

With an extension of the East Paddock, the capacity of the ground was raised to 38,000 in 1954. Additional seating in the West Stand was also added around this time.

The record attendance at Bloomfield Road occurred when Wolverhampton Wanderers visited on 17 September 1955. In front of 38,098, the hosts won 2–1.

On 24 May 1957, Barcelona approached Blackpool to play a match at Bloomfield Road. The kick-off was scheduled for 22:00, but the game actually got underway at 22:40. As the hosts entered the stadium, the visiting Spanish support greeted them with firecrackers. Blackpool rested nine players, but managed a 3–3 draw with the visitors, who had beaten Real Madrid 6–1 in their previous match. Blackpool's goals came from Ken Smith, Ernie Taylor and Sandy Harris.

To inaugurate the new floodlighting system at the ground, a friendly was held against Scottish League champions Hearts. The system was one of the most modern in the country, and, because of the town's geographical location, special safeguards had been made so that the 145-feet-high pylons could withstand the coastal weather. The manufacturers guaranteed that the galvanised tubular-steel towers would not only resist corrosion but would also be able to withstand winds of between 90 and 100 miles per hour. In addition, the piles for each pylon had been sunk to a depth of 37 feet to ensure they had a firm base. Each of the pylons at that time carried 36 1,500-watt lamps, giving a combined power of 216 kilowatts.

Bloomfield Road hosted its 1,000th Football League game on 10 September 1960, with a visit by Lancashire neighbours Bolton Wanderers. The game was the first to be televised in England. It was broadcast on ITV, billed as The Big Game, and three cameras were sited at the back of the Spion Kop. Coverage was scheduled for the last five minutes of the first half and the whole of the second. Bolton won the game 1–0.

The capacity of the ground was reduced to 30,000 in the late 1960s when new seating was installed. During the following decade, the board introduced seats in the East Paddock, a move that proved so unpopular that it was reversed within twelve months.

A roof was put up over the Spion Kop at the north end of the ground, with BLACKPOOL FOOTBALL CLUB painted on its rear; however, it was taken down in 1981 after only twenty years. The council thought it was dangerous, but the club could not afford to repair the roof, so it was removed, leaving the visiting fans exposed to the elements for the next two decades. A knock-on effect was the removal of seats that had been put into the East Stand. These seats were supposedly a very poor idea as the first three rows were below pitch level, thus providing a poor vantage point from which to watch games.

The final Christmas Day fixture at Bloomfield Road occurred in 1965, with the visit of Blackburn Rovers. The Football League announced: "Christmas Day matches were dropped from our calendar when it became obvious to all concerned – spectators, players and officials alike – that people preferred to spend the day at home."

Ammonia was thrown on the Spion Kop towards the end of a 7 October 1968 Second Division derby with Blackburn Rovers. Numerous fans were injured by the indiscriminate throwing of the substance. Several were taken to hospital, and four spectators, including a police officer, were detained overnight. The incident made front-page headlines nationally as "alarming and frightening developments" in football hooliganism. "A night of soccer madness and the madness did not end in the ground, for further incidents occurred outside."

The Kop Shop opened for the first time for the visit of Everton on 19 September 1970. Located in a disused ticket office in the north-east corner of the ground, the shop was run by the supporters' club and made available a full range of football souvenirs, including badges, pens, scarves and pennants.

On 24 August 1974, 17-year-old Blackpool fan Kevin Olsson was fatally stabbed at the rear of the Spion Kop during a game against Bolton Wanderers.

On 17 March 1986, the club's directors announced that they were ready to sell the Bloomfield Road ground as a site for a supermarket. A lucrative deal was being discussed with a Manchester development company. Forthcoming safety measures meant that both the West and South stands would likely be condemned the following year, otherwise the club would have to spend £2 million on improvements. With the sale, the directors wanted to clear the football club's debts and move to nearby Blackpool Borough's rugby ground on Princess Street. The scheme was rejected by the town council the following month, at which point the board of directors decided to put the club up for sale.

In the summer of 1989, the club had to spend "thousands" on repairs to the ground, with the South Stand roof being the main concern. Further safety work was necessary in order for the stadium to continue staging League football. Also that year, the North-West Stand was condemned in the wake of stricter safety standards. Demolition began almost immediately, and temporary seating was installed to accommodate visiting support to the ground.

Bloomfield Road became the first ground in England to witness police in full riot gear. Before, during and after the Third Division encounter with Birmingham City there were numerous disturbances and skirmishes around the town and police reinforcements were drafted in from all over the Fylde. At the game, visiting fans began rioting on the open Spion Kop terracing, which was allocated exclusively for away supporters. After some delay, the police finally entered the terraces and restored order.

In the 1990s, with Bloomfield Road in an increasing state of disrepair, new safety measures reduced the capacity from 18,000 to 12,000, and then down to 9,000. The western half of the Kop was closed, with the eastern half open only to visiting support and the East Paddock became segregated. The atmosphere came almost exclusively from the south end, unless there was a large away following.

On 10 August 1991, seven days before the season kicked off with the visit of Walsall, county council inspectors were at the ground to give the club's new police control box the final approval. Chief executive David Hatton commented: "We are working on the match being on at home next week as planned. We had a visit from the county council on Friday and it was very encouraging."

On 2 November 1991, a draw with Scarborough marked a year's passing since Blackpool were last beaten in the League at Bloomfield Road.

Former chairman Owen Oyston submitted plans, on several occasions, to build a new 40,000 all-seater stadium adjoining a large entertainment complex. Outline planning permission for the new ground, which was to be built at nearby Whyndyke Farm, was granted in June 1992.

The "Golden Gamble" match-day draw scheme was introduced for the first time for the visit of 4 September 1993 visit of Barnet to Bloomfield Road. Fans could purchase lottery tickets for £1 before each home game, and a draw at half-time by the guest of the day gives punters a chance to win 50% of the gross take, up to £2,000. The scheme is still in operation today. This fund-raising scheme followed "Goldbond", a weekly draw that was launched three years earlier.

On 16 October 1993, full plans for the club's proposed new multi-purpose stadium were submitted to the town's mayor by Owen Oyston and Stanley Matthews. The plans included a 20,000 capacity stadium with retractable roof, 92 executive boxes in the North and South stands, and a twelve-storey luxury hotel with 115 rooms with balconies overlooking the pitch. Leisure facilities included an Olympic-sized swimming pool, indoor five-a-side football area, gymnasium and keep-fit area. Every seat would have access to restaurants, bars and fast-food outlets. However, in 1996 Oyston was convicted of rape and jailed for six years, and nothing further was heard about the move to Whyndyke Farm.

A supplement in Blackpool's matchday programme for the visit of Cardiff City on 11 March 2000 revealed the long-awaited plans for the redevelopment of the ground. It confirmed that plans had been submitted to the borough council and both the chief executive and principal planning officer said that the proposals were both "realistic and attractive". The architects TTH and developer Ballast Wiltshire were both involved in the Stadium of Light development in Sunderland. The overall capacity was announced as 15,254.

On 23 May 2000, the club was given the go-ahead for the redevelopment of Bloomfield Road. A unanimous vote by the resort's councillors sealed the fate of plans to replace the existing stadium with an £11 million state-of-the-art structure.

In 2000 and 2001 respectively, the Spion Kop and West Stand were demolished to make way for the new stands. The Kop was closed after 8 May visit of Colchester United. The pitch was moved slightly north and west to make room for expansion on the south and east sides of the ground in future years.

On 7 August 2001, a pre-season friendly against Spanish side Athletic Bilbao was held at Bloomfield Road. The game ended 2–2.

The West Stand was completed in the summer of 2002 and was officially opened on 6 August, with former Seasiders player Keith Walwyn the guest of honour for a friendly against Blackburn Rovers. Lord Pendry unveiled a plaque above the main entrance celebrating the Football Foundation's contribution to the new stadium. The South Stand, meanwhile, was granted a reprieve which meant it would re-open for visiting supporters for the forthcoming 2002–03 campaign. All matches would be all-ticket for visiting support. If a club requested more than the 1,500 allocation, Blackpool would open the East Paddock north section, thus allowing a further 1,000 away support.

On 25 June 2003, fans were allowed into the ground to take a final look around the South and East stands before their demolition. Former Blackpool player Dave Durie was also in attendance.

In July 2003, Bloomfield Road was granted a licence to hold marriage ceremonies.

The stadium was used for two matches during the 2005 UEFA Women's Championship. Blackpool Rugby League Club used the stadium for their home matches in National League Two in the 2005 and 2006 seasons and since 2005 it has staged the annual National League Cup final.

The stadium hosted a 2004–05 Victory Shield match between England under-16 team and Scotland under-16 team on 26 November 2004.

On 22 September 2005, Bloomfield Road hosted its 2,000th Football League match. Brentford were the visitors for a game that ended 0–0.

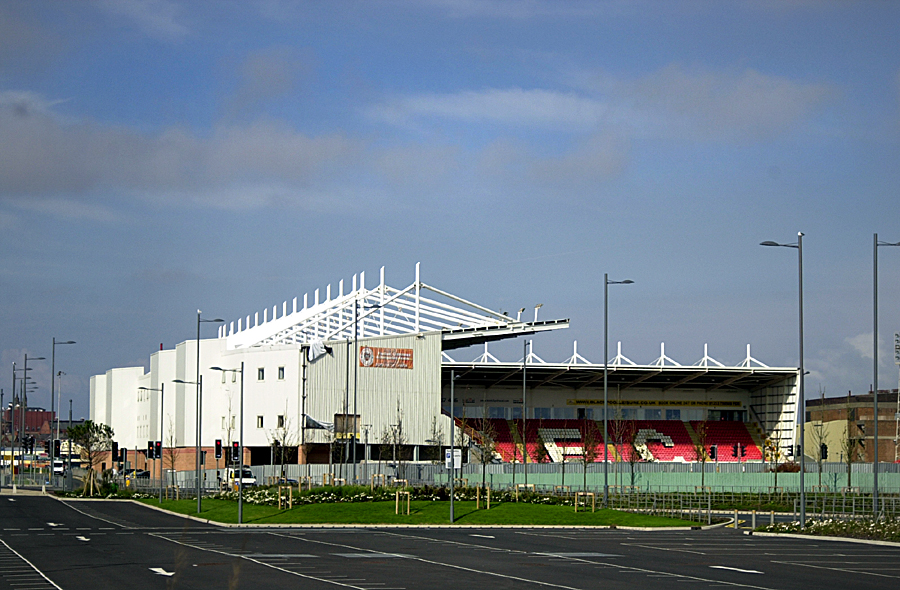
The stadium as it was in 2006, prior to the re-construction of the South Stand

On 11 October 2007, England under-16s drew 2–2 with Northern Ireland under-16s in a Victory Shield 2007-08 match at Bloomfield Road. The match was televised live on Sky Sports.

In January 2007, Blackpool chairman Karl Oyston reacted angrily to news that the town had lost out to Manchester in the race for the UK's first supercasino. He was concerned that the news could drive potential investors away from purchasing space in the South Stand. Oyston had previously insisted that work would only begin on the long-awaited structure when office space had been sold.

In March 2008, following news that Whyndyke Farm is to be the home for a new psychiatric hospital to replace the Parkwood unit at Victoria Hospital, and that the site is also earmarked for new housing, Karl Oyston confirmed that plans for a move to a new stadium at Whyndyke Farm were unlikely to ever be revived.

On 25 April 2009, after his Nottingham Forest team drew 1–1 with Blackpool at Bloomfield Road, Billy Davies complained about the state of the stadium and its pitch: "It is a disgrace and so are some of the surroundings. It was not rolled and not prepared properly. It was not a pitch on which to play football." After the season ended, the pitch was relaid.

The FA chose the stadium to host England women's opening Group 5 qualifying game for the 2011 World Cup against Malta on 25 October 2009, which England won 8–0 in front of a crowd of 3,681.

On 2 May 2010, Bloomfield Road experienced its highest attendance for thirty years. 12,296 (11,192 home; 1,104 away) people watched Blackpool's 1–1 draw with Bristol City as the hosts secured a final-day play-off spot. This beat the previous high of 10,427, when Rotherham United visited on 20 August 1980.

On 24 May, at the civic reception held in the club's honour after they gained promotion to the Premier League, manager Ian Holloway thanked the fans "for making our ground somewhere to feel safe and express yourself."

On 26 May, Karl Oyston revealed that work would begin on the East Stand, which would complete the Bloomfield Road redevelopment, "as soon as is realistically possible". Work commenced on 14 June. In addition, the seating in the North and West stands will be replaced gradually through the season due to the fading of their tangerine colour, as well as electronic turnstiles, a new pitch sprinkler system, large video screen, new media and medical facilities, new floodlighting, further hospitality areas in the South Stand and enlarged dugouts. The pitch was also relaid.

A webcam was fitted so fans could keep track of the progress of construction in the East Stand.

Wigan Athletic were in line to be the first visitors to Bloomfield Road as a Premier League ground on 14 August, but on 12 July it was announced that the East Stand would not be ready in time; as a result, the fixture was reversed.

The club requested 1,500–2,000 fans to test the temporary East Stand with free entry to the Lancashire Senior Cup game against Morecambe on 25 August in order for the safety certificates to be issued.

England manager Fabio Capello was present at Bloomfield Road for its debut hosting of a Premier League game. Fulham were the visitors on 28 August 2010, and the Italian was reportedly in attendance to watch the Cottagers' Bobby Zamora.

On 20 November 2010, William, Prince of Wales attended the fixture between Blackpool and Wolverhampton Wanderers while in town for the stag party of one of his friends. Scotland manager Craig Levein was also in attendance.

The ground was chosen to host Carlisle United's home FA Cup third round tie in January 2016 against Yeovil Town, with the Cumbrians' Brunton Park affected by flooding in the city.

In June 2019, the ground came into the control of Simon Sadler, after he acquired a controlling 96.2% stake in Blackpool F.C.

Several upgrades to Bloomfield Road were announced in spring 2025, including the redevelopment of the temporary East Stand.

== Stands ==
The main entrance to the ground used to be on Bloomfield Road, via the South Stand; however, the development of the ground that began in the first few years of the 21st century meant it is now from Seasiders Way, via the Matthews Stand on the west side of the ground.

=== West ===
==== Sir Stanley Matthews West Stand ====
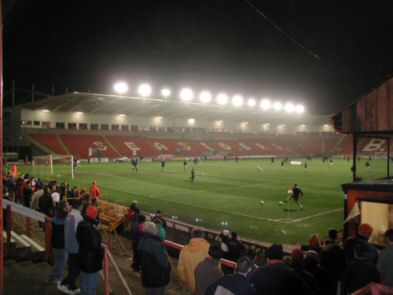
Sir Stanley Matthews Stand, viewed from the old South Stand

This stand, called the Westinghouse Sir Stanley Matthews Stand, is the main stand. It was redeveloped between 2001 and 2002. It is named after Sir Stanley Matthews. The players' tunnel, which was formerly located in the South Stand, is now in this stand, and behind the main seating is a hospitality balcony with executive boxes at the rear from the south end to the Directors' Box at the halfway line, from which point to the north-west corner is the Stanley Matthews Hospitality Suite. The stand also contains office space as well as all the club offices and main reception. The club's nickname, Seasiders, is spelled out in capital letters on white seats amongst the tangerine majority. After its rebuilding, the stand was originally known as The Pricebusters Matthews Stand.

In October 2009, a replica of the club's crest, measuring 4 metres (13 feet) in diameter, was mounted at each end of the West Stand's facade, overlooking Seasiders Way.

The television-camera gantry is now situated on this stand.

=== North ===
==== Stan Mortensen North Stand (The Kop) ====
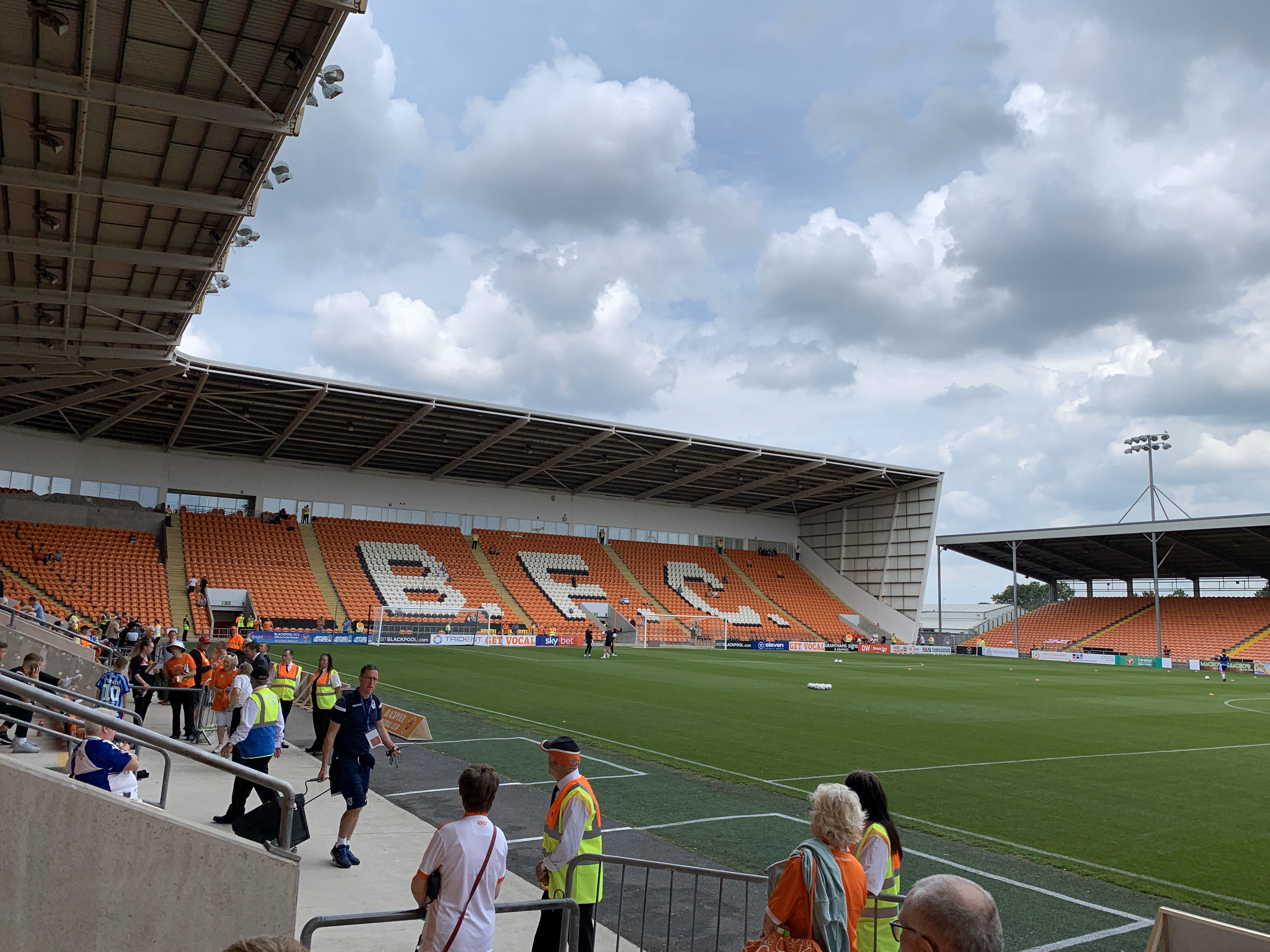
The Stan Mortensen North Stand in 2019

This stand is at the north end of the ground. Within the stand, blocks A to C and the front rows of blocks D and E are the Spion Kop (now called Clifton Quality Meats Stand) and the rear of blocks D and E contain the club's Family Stand (now the Check in Family Stand). It replaced the old Spion Kop and is connected to the West Stand by the North-West Corner stand. It is named after Stan Mortensen, who is the only player in history to score a hat-trick at Wembley in an FA Cup Final. The club use both The Kop and North Stand on tickets for this stand. The abbreviation "B.F.C." is spelled out by white seats. There is no hospitality balcony at the rear of the stand, with additional rows of general seating and office space behind, which during matches are "blacked out". The stand also houses the Safehands Green Start Nursery and offices for Blackpool Primary Care Trust. Behind the stand is a statue of Mortensen, which was unveiled on 23 August 2005 by his widow and Jimmy Armfield. The statue, which is life-size, shows "Morty" in the pose of scoring a goal. It cost £25,000, which was paid for by the club, Blackpool Council and Blackpool fans.

The original Kop had a roof installed over it in the 1960s, but it was removed in the 1980s on safety grounds.

==== North-West Stand ====
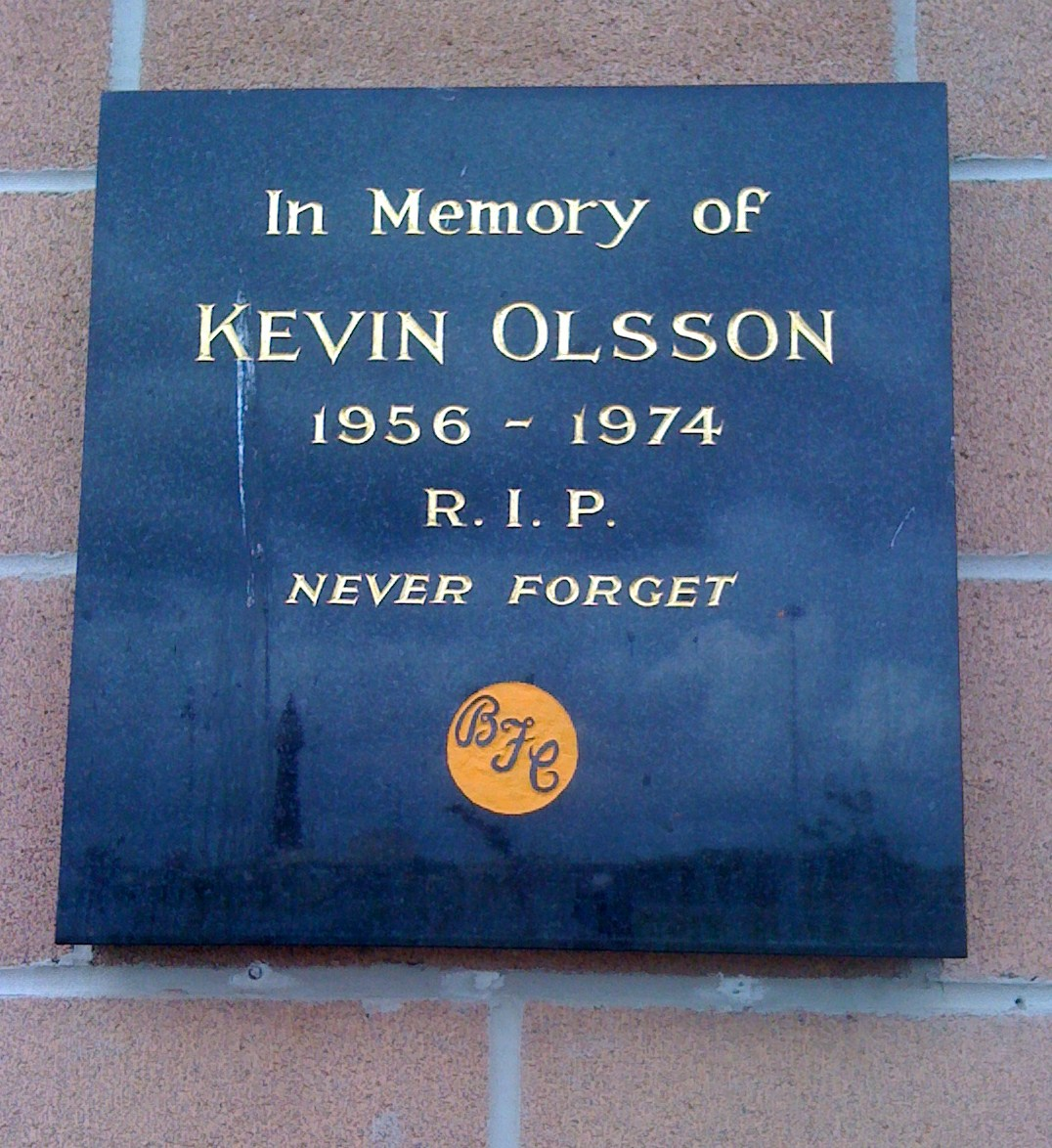
A plaque commemorating Kevin Olsson, a Blackpool supporter who was fatally stabbed during a match at Bloomfield Road

This stand, which is named Brands Scaffolding North-West Stand, joins the West Stand and the North Stand (The Kop) together, it has the same number of rows as the West and has the rest of the hospitality balcony directly above.

In 2009, Blackpool supporters raised money for a memorial plaque for Kevin Olsson, who was stabbed to death on the Kop on 24 August 1974. On the 35th anniversary of his death, the plaque was unveiled on the exterior wall of this corner.

=== East ===
==== East Stand ====
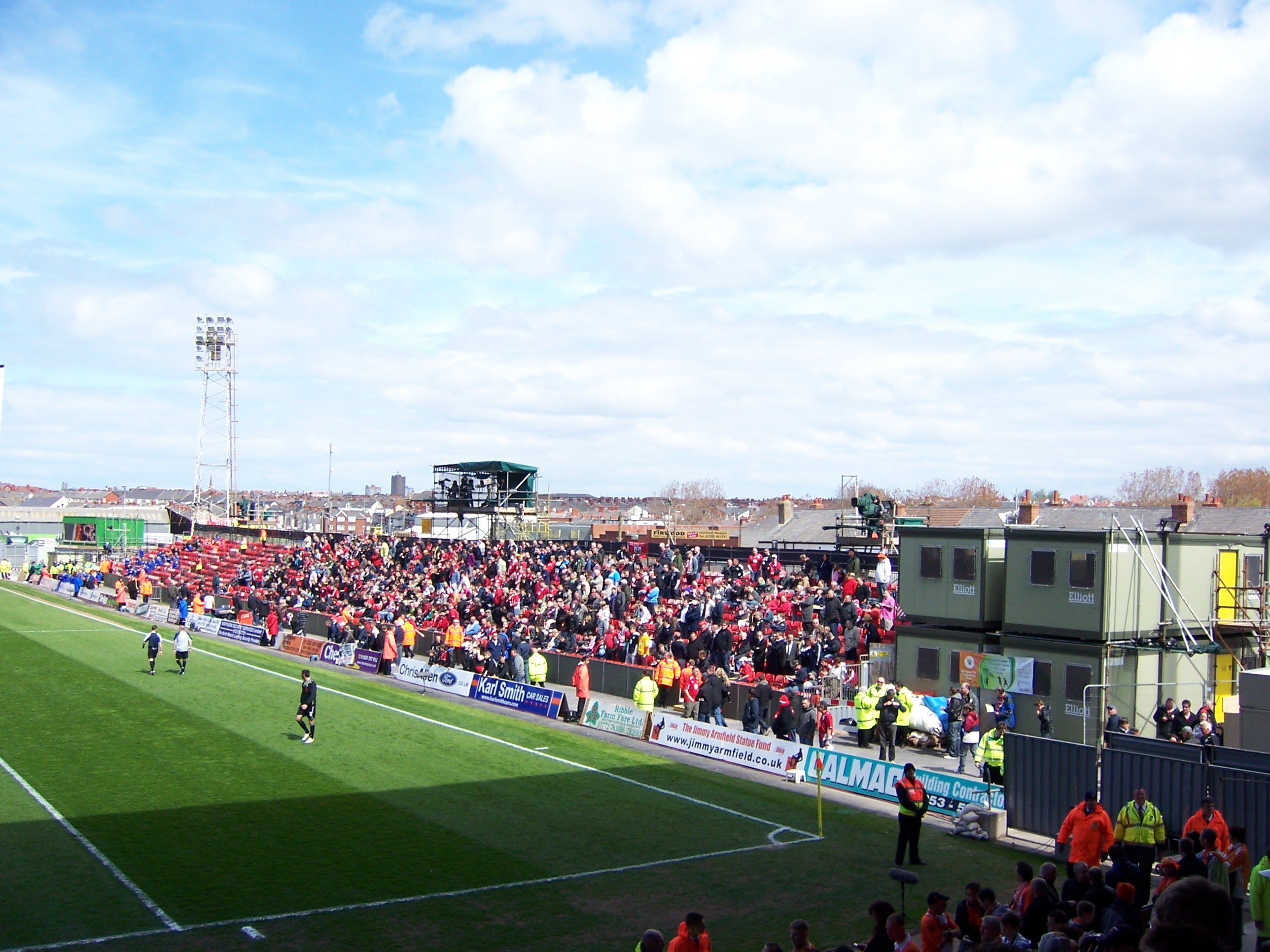
Temporary East Stand in 2010

Known in its former guise as the East Paddock or the "Scratching Sheds", this stand has a current capacity of 5,120 all-seated. The street that runs behind it (running parallel with Central Drive) is called Back Henry Street (it being the back side of Henry Street) – a name preserved by a Blackpool supporters' messageboard.

There was an incident in 2005 when Sheffield Wednesday supporters jumped up and down on the previous temporary stand full and some of its middle section gave way; however, nobody was injured.

In December 2007, following a home match against Stoke City, the stand was slightly damaged due to the appearance of a small hole in the floor. The stand had to be re-floored and following an inspection by the Safety Advisory Group, the capacity was reduced to 1,563 for the next home match against Coventry City on 22 December 2007. The stand passed an inspection after the Coventry game, and the capacity was restored to 1,965.

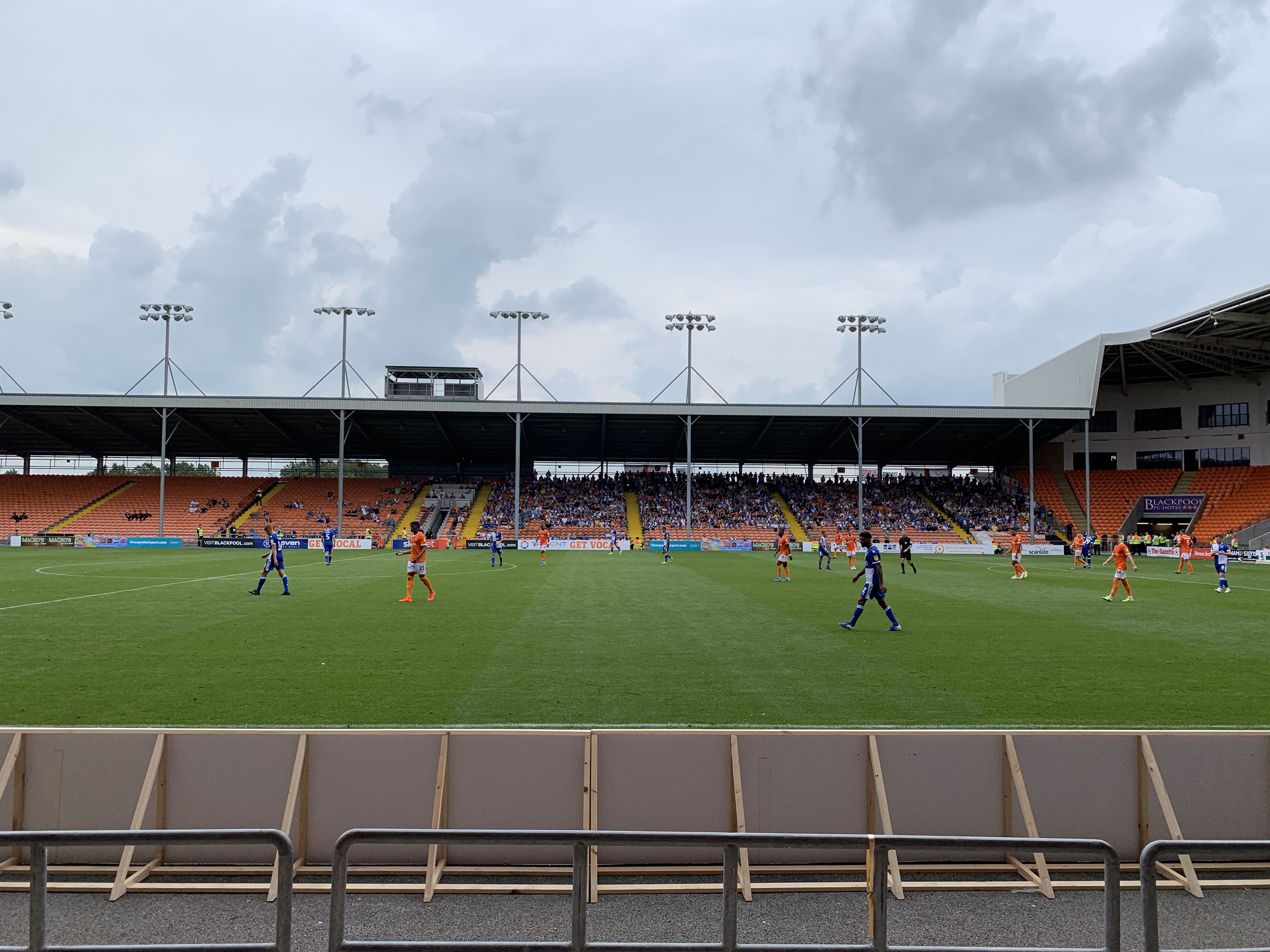
The temporary East Stand in 2019, built in 2010 to bring the ground up to code for the club's debut season in the Premier League. The South-East corner is also in view

In January 2008, the club applied for planning permission to build a six-row extension to the East Stand which would increase the stand capacity by an additional 972 seats to 2,937. They were granted permission in April 2008. On 8 July 2008, the club confirmed that they still proposed to go ahead with the extension. However, no work has yet been done and the capacity remains at about 1,750.

On 14 November 2009 it was revealed that the football club hope to work with Urban Regeneration Company ReBlackpool to build a new East Stand that would contain both seating and office or retail space rather than, as originally planned, for just seating. This will mean a larger stand is to be built, which will require additional land to be acquired.

Six months later, in May 2010, Karl Oyston stated that work on the new East Stand would begin almost immediately. On 14 June the temporary seating comprising the East Stand was removed, to be replaced with a 5,120-seat covered temporary stand which, at the start of the new season, raised the capacity to 16,220.

The stand was generally closed for the 2015–16 season and was only opened for large away support; smaller away support were given Blocks A and B of the North Stand.

For the 2019–20 season, away supporters are back in the East Stand with home supporters returning to the North Stand's Blocks A and B.

In 2023, discussions got underway regarding creating enough space in Henry Street to build a permanent East Stand. This included Blackpool Council being asked to use eminent domain to purchase and demolish 27 buildings in that street. A planning application was due to be submitted to the council by the football club in the spring. Two years later, it was announced that the existing East Stand will be retained but redeveloped as part of a series of upgrades at the stadium.

=== South ===
==== Jimmy Armfield South Stand ====
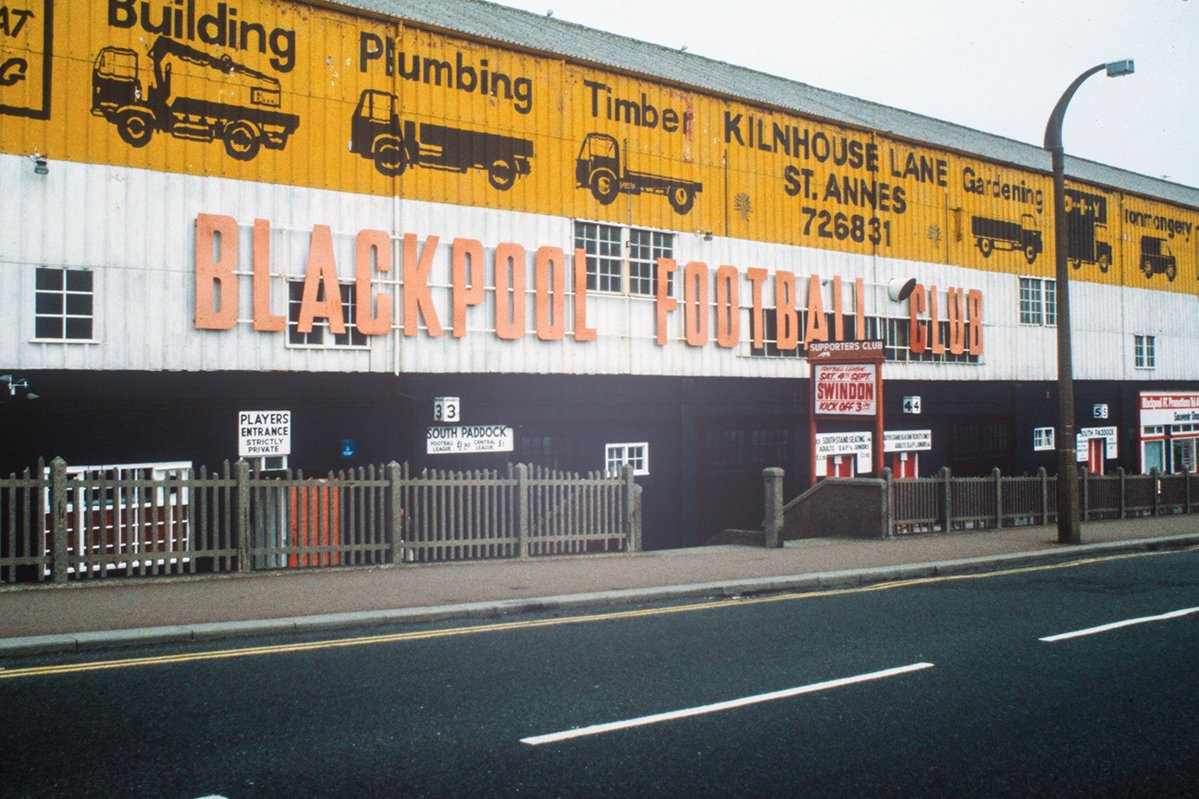
The second incarnation of the Bloomfield Road facade

The previous 1925 main stand was demolished in 2003. This is the two-tiered stand that abutted Bloomfield Road.

On 14 January 2003, Blackpool chairman Karl Oyston promised the redevelopment of the South Stand would go ahead but insisted he would not be pressured into making any rash decisions. He revealed that he spent the previous day in talks about the project but vowed he would make an announcement only when the time was right and all plans had been finalised.

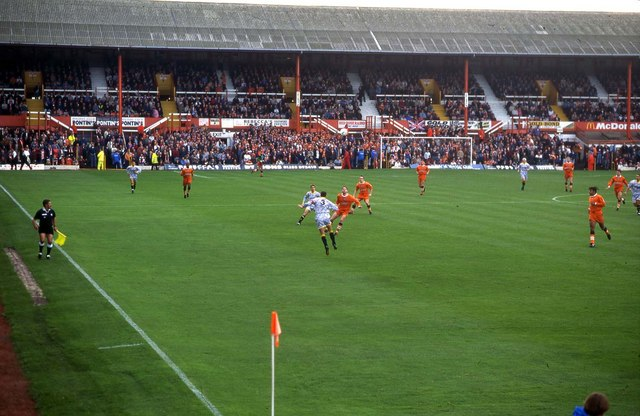
The South Stand in 1995

In the summer of 2006 the club announced that building of the South-West Corner of the ground, which would seat 582, would begin on 23 September 2006. Whilst the central corridor redevelopment has been completed, including the demolition of the Bloomfield Road bridge (which was located to the west of the ground, towards Bloomfield Road's junction with Lytham Road) and the construction of Seasiders Way, building work did not commence. Work did eventually begin on the hotel on land formerly occupied by the Tangerine Night Club, which had been announced by the club to be built at the same time as the South-West Corner. It is leased by Radisson Individuals and opened in May 2008. The original supporters' social club, which later became known as "Morty's Bar", was built adjacent to the ground and opened in 1966. The location was a temporary measure until more suitable accommodation could be found. Land subsequently became available across Bloomfield Road and, after much delay, was purchased from British Rail in early 1973. After months of negotiations with various national breweries by both the directors and representatives of the supporters' club, Watney Manns agreed to finance the project. Plans were submitted to Blackpool Corporation and final approval was given in April 1974 and work commenced in September. A fire ripped through the building in November 2002, and its demolition was discussed.

The continued delays for building work to commence became a source of controversy with the club's fans. In a radio phone-in on BBC Radio Lancashire on 6 February 2008, Karl Oyston stated that, "The South will be built as and when it is right for the football business. I know we need to progress as a club and it is top of our agenda, believe me, but it wasn't right to do it now." He also confirmed that the club had no immediate plans to start building the stand. On 14 May 2008, Blackpool-based radio station Radio Wave 96.5 announced on their website and news bulletin that work was to commence on the South Stand in the summer. However, this prompted an immediate response by the football club, who issued a statement on their official website expressing their disappointment that a local Press agency had issued a media report about the development. And they denied the report was true, stating that "the story about the South Stand developments is a complete fabrication", adding that "any future communications and announcements to be made with regards to the South Stand will come from the club itself." A week later it was claimed that the club looked certain to begin building work in summer 2008 and it was confirmed that the club had a number of options, including building a temporary stand, a permanent stand or a mix with a permanent South-West Corner and a temporary South Stand, with Karl Oyston stating, "I've made it very clear to the board that if we don't increase our capacity by one of the scenarios that I've outlined to them – and I've outlined every scenario that I believe is available – then we will struggle." Adding that "The preferred option is obviously to build a permanent South-West and South. The worst-case scenario fallback is to build a temporary south." It was also stated that building a new South Stand and South-West Corner will now cost about £6–8 million and would raise the capacity of the stadium by 3,000. An Oystons Estate Agency sign was also erected advertising retail space for lease, a pub/restaurant and "hotel with hospitality suites for match days" in the new South Stand.

On 8 July 2008, the club released a statement from club president Valeri Belokon stating that work on both the new South Stand and the South-West Corner would begin immediately, with Belokon and the Oyston family in a full partnership to fund the building of the stands. It was confirmed that the total capacity of the two new stands will be 3,500. Four weeks later, on 5 August, after no work appeared to have begun, the club issued a further statement in which they confirmed that work was continuing at the design stage and that work would begin on the site by the end of the month with the structure of the stand beginning about three months later. Fletcher, King Howard Associates, the construction project managers, further confirmed that this was part of a 40-week programme with the stand due to be completed by May 2009.

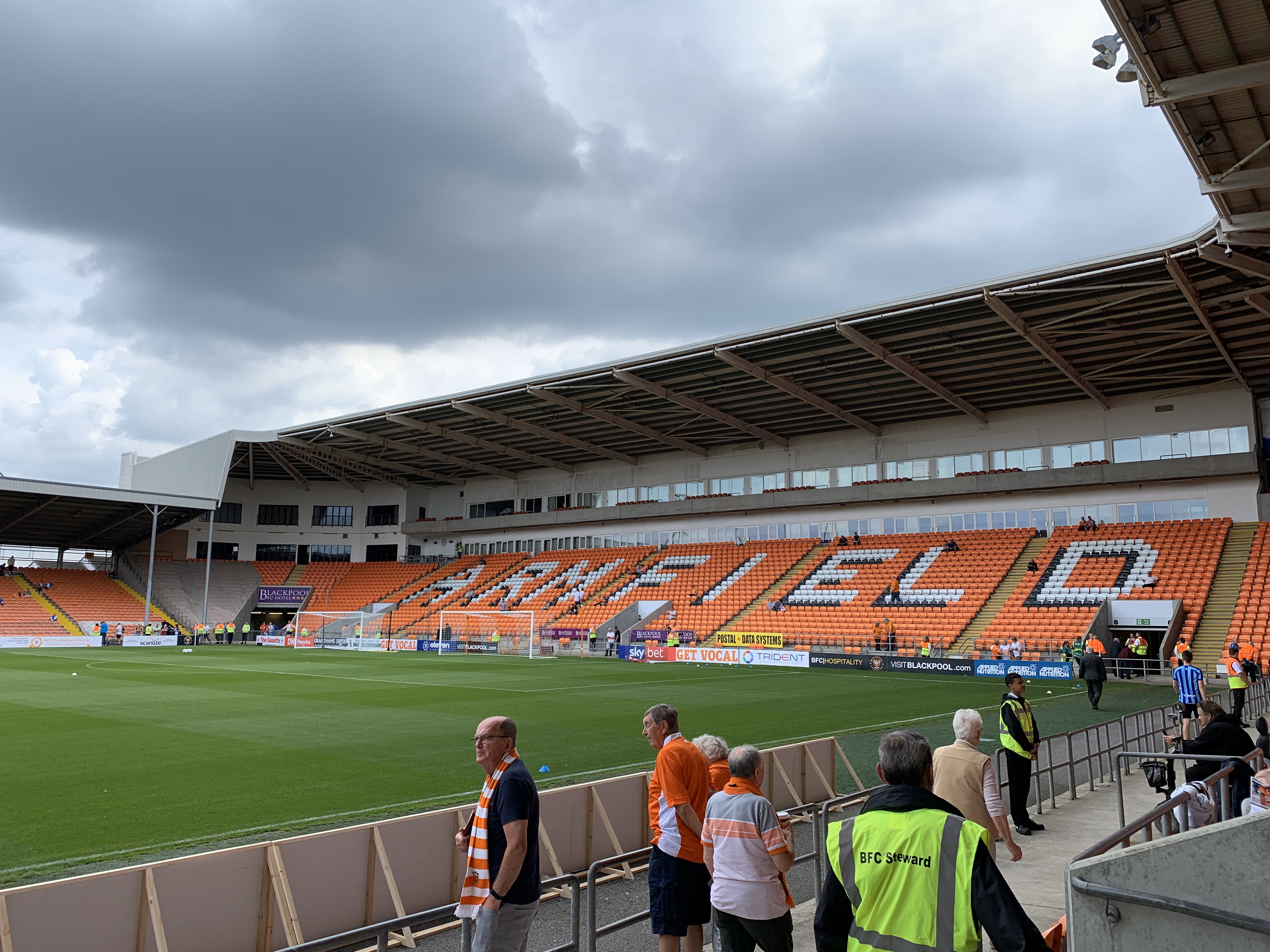
A view of the South Stand in 2019

In April 2009, Pool's first-choice goalkeeper, Paul Rachubka, revealed that work commencing on the South Stand was a contributing factor to his signing a two-year extension to his contract.

On 22 June the club confirmed that steelwork had started arriving, with Project Manager Brendan Flanagan saying, "There is a lot happening on site at the moment. The steelwork is on site, and the pre-cast terracing is due in on Wednesday and it won't be long before we see something rising from the ground. We are aiming to start work on the roof for the South-West Corner towards the third week of July." On 15 July it was revealed that the club were negotiating with Blackpool Council about opening at least part of the stand before work on it is complete, in the hope that at least 1,000 seats would be available to use by mid-September.

It was revealed on 21 July that the club had submitted revised plans to Blackpool Council, with an increase in the number of hotel rooms to 56, half of which will have balconies overlooking the pitch. The revised plans also included enhancements to the external look of the stand in order that it will fit in better with the rest of Blackpool's Central Corridor. It was also revealed that the cost of £8.5m for the stand will include £2.5m to fit out the hotel and about £500,000 on the new supporters bar. Karl Oyston said, "About half the hotel rooms will overlook the pitch. These will double up as hospitality boxes on match days and the hotel will be linked through to the function rooms in the West Stand. The only undefined use is the first floor of the South Stand, which may be allocated to leisure or community use. The ground floor will be a supporters' bar and a reception area for whatever goes in on the first floor. We have also made this application in order to improve the external appearance of the stand so that it will sit better with the improvements that have been made to Bancroft Park and Central Corridor. We will continue to work closely with the council in order to try and make Central Corridor look as appealing as we can because it's currently the main gateway into Blackpool." Occupants of "Executive Pitch View" bedrooms are requested to keep the room's curtains closed while matches are in progress.

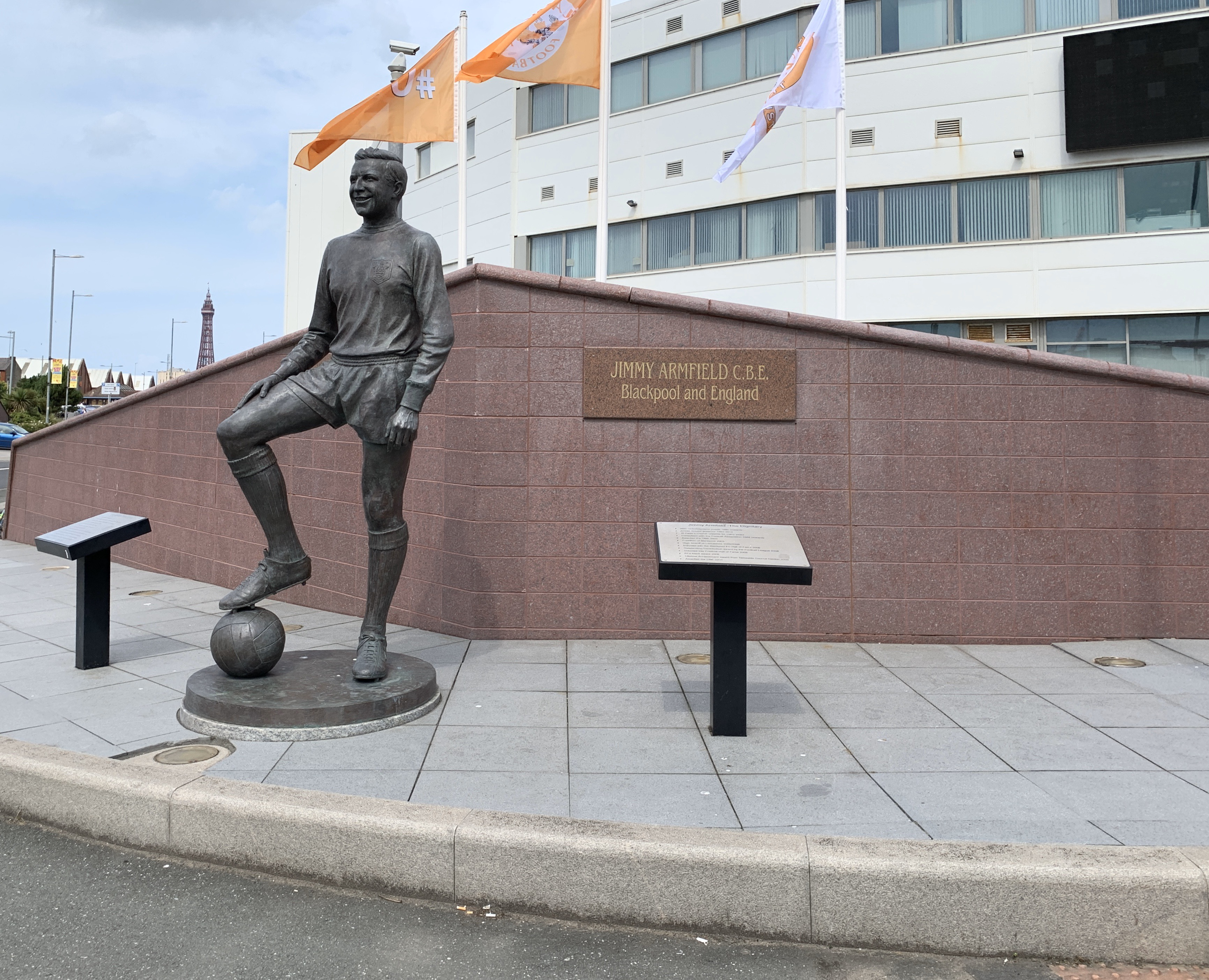
Jimmy Armfield's statue, pictured in 2019

The hotel includes a second-floor restaurant named The Corner Flag (formerly Rowley's Bar & Bistro), a spa and a fitness centre.

On 12 November 2009 it was confirmed that Blackpool F.C. had submitted a document to Blackpool Council, to be heard on 19 November, applying for permission to bring the South Stand into operation in December.

After work began on the stand, the club published photographs of the ongoing development on its website on a regular basis.

On 10 March 2010, the club announced the opening of the stand would be for the next home game, ten days later, against Crystal Palace. Valeri Belokon and Jimmy Armfield formally cut the ribbon to confirm the opening of the £8.5 million structure.

On 1 May 2011, a nine-foot-tall bronze statue of Armfield was unveiled in front of his stand, exactly forty years after he retired from playing.

The club shop is located in the South Stand.

==== South-West Corner ====
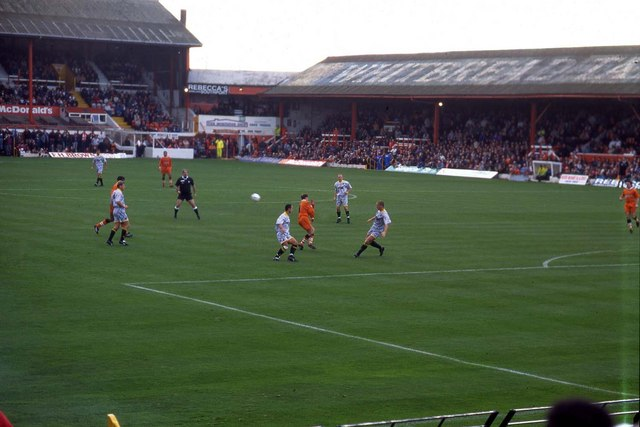
A view of the South-West Corner in 1995

This corner contains 815 seats, houses a large video screen, and the players' families' hospitality balcony. The club's hall of fame, originally unveiled by Jimmy Armfield in the North Stand in 2006, was moved to the South-West Corner in July 2019.

==== South-East Corner ====
Work began on the South-East Corner of the ground in early June 2011, restoring a section of the ground that had been lost eight years earlier when the South Stand was demolished, and adding 500 seats to the capacity. It also houses the hotel entrance and a restaurant.

== Stand capacities ==
As of April 2025

As of April 2025, Blackpool F.C.'s official website states that Bloomfield Road has a capacity of "just under 16,500".

Figures taken from the Safety Certificate document issued by Blackpool Council in November 2018 are listed below.

Bloomfield Road stand capacities
Stand	Blocks	Capacity	Notes
North Stand (Kop)	A–E	2,748	
North-West Corner	F–H	801	
West Stand	J–Q	3,684	
West Stand Hospitality Balcony		738	
South-West Corner	R–S	815	
South Stand	T–X	2,471	
South Stand Hospitality Balcony		140	
South-East Corner	Y-Z	643	
East Stand	EA, EB, EC, ED, EE, EF, EG, EH	4,576	Visiting supporters moved back to this stand prior to the 2019–20 season. Capacity reduced due to persistent standing.
Total		16,616	

=== Average attendances ===
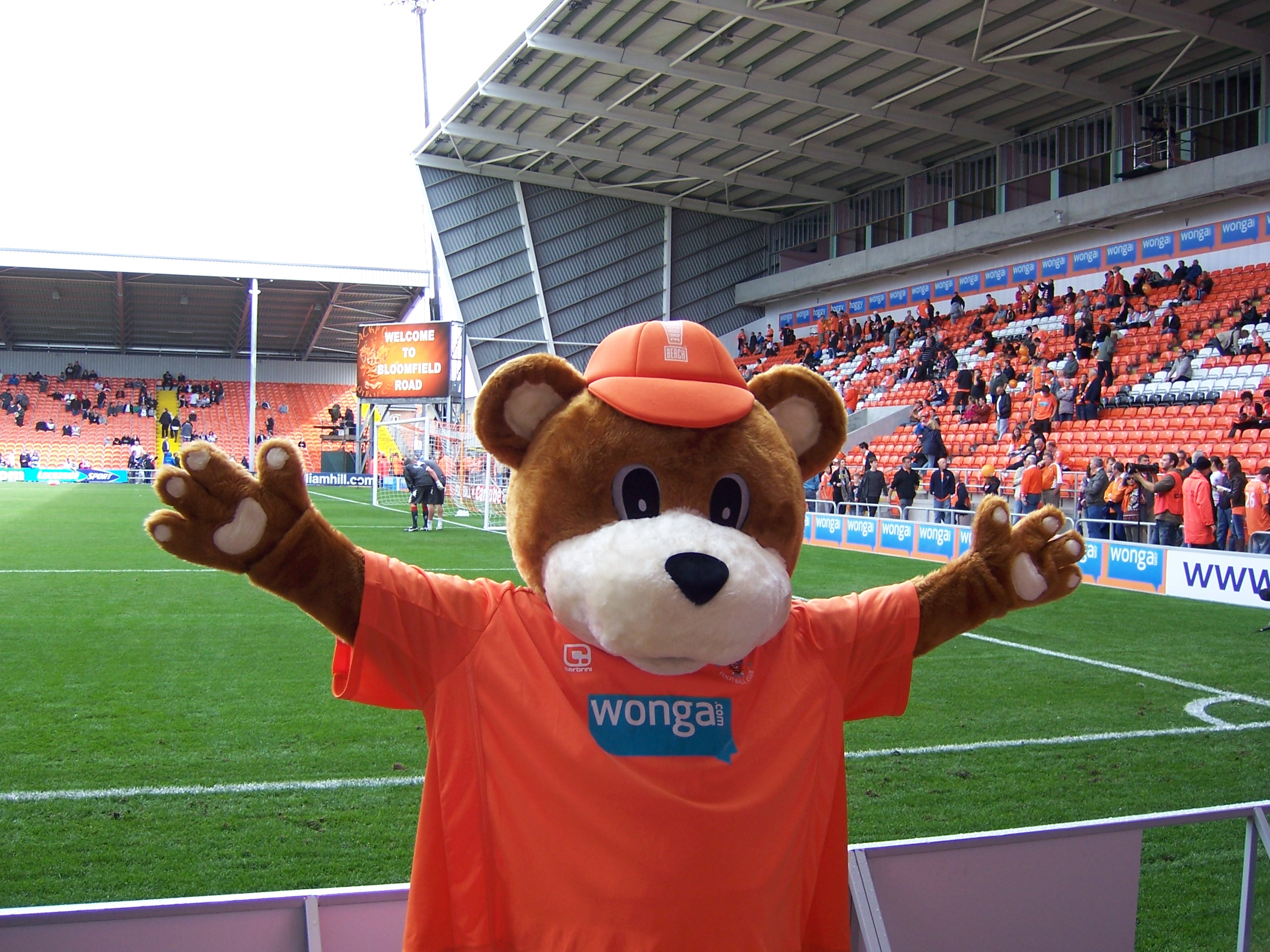
Bloomfield Bear, the club's mascot

Past averages (note that the capacity fluctuates):
2023–24: 10,667
2022–23: 12,240
2021–22: 12,104
2019–20: 8,770
2018–19: 5,517
2017–18: 4,178
2016–17: 3,456
2015–16: 7,052
2014–15: 10,928
2013–14: 14,217 (82%)
2012–13: 13,916 (80%)
2011–12: 12,764 (79%)
2010–11: 15,782 (97%)
2009–10: 8,611 (91%)
2008–09: 7,842 (81%)
2007–08: 8,861 (92%)
2006–07: 6,877 (73%)
2005–06: 5,820 (61%)
2004–05: 6,031 (59%)
2003–04: 6,326 (62%)
2002–03: 6,991 (69%)
2001–02: 5,701 (56%)
2000–01: 4,459 (44%)
1999–00: 4,841 (43%)
1998–99: 5,116 (45%)
1997–98: 5,212 (46%)
1996–97: 4,987 (46%)
1995–96: 5,818 (60%)
1994–95: 4,744 (46%)
1993–94: 4,761 (49%)
1992–93: 5,501 (53%)

Note: The capacity at Bloomfield Road has fluctuated throughout this period. Current capacity is 17,338. In the 2006–07 season it was about 9,450. In the 2007–08 season it changed a number of times due to extra seating in the West Stand and Kop and a decrease in the East Stand. In the 2008–09 season, it was 9,650.

== Groundsmen ==
Paul Burgess, who formulated his career as a groundsman at Bloomfield Road when he was a 14-year-old on work experience, was head groundsman at Real Madrid's Santiago Bernabéu Stadium between 2009 and 2020. A Blackpool fan, who used to sell programmes outside the ground on matchdays, on 22 May 2010 Burgess was working on the Bernabeu pitch for the Champions League Final while the Seasiders were playing in their Championship play-off final at Wembley.

Other past Bloomfield Road groundsmen include John Turner, Keith Wadeson, Stan Raby and Gary Lewis, who died while in the role in 2019. Harry Bradley succeeded Lewis but left in November 2020.

== Advertising ==
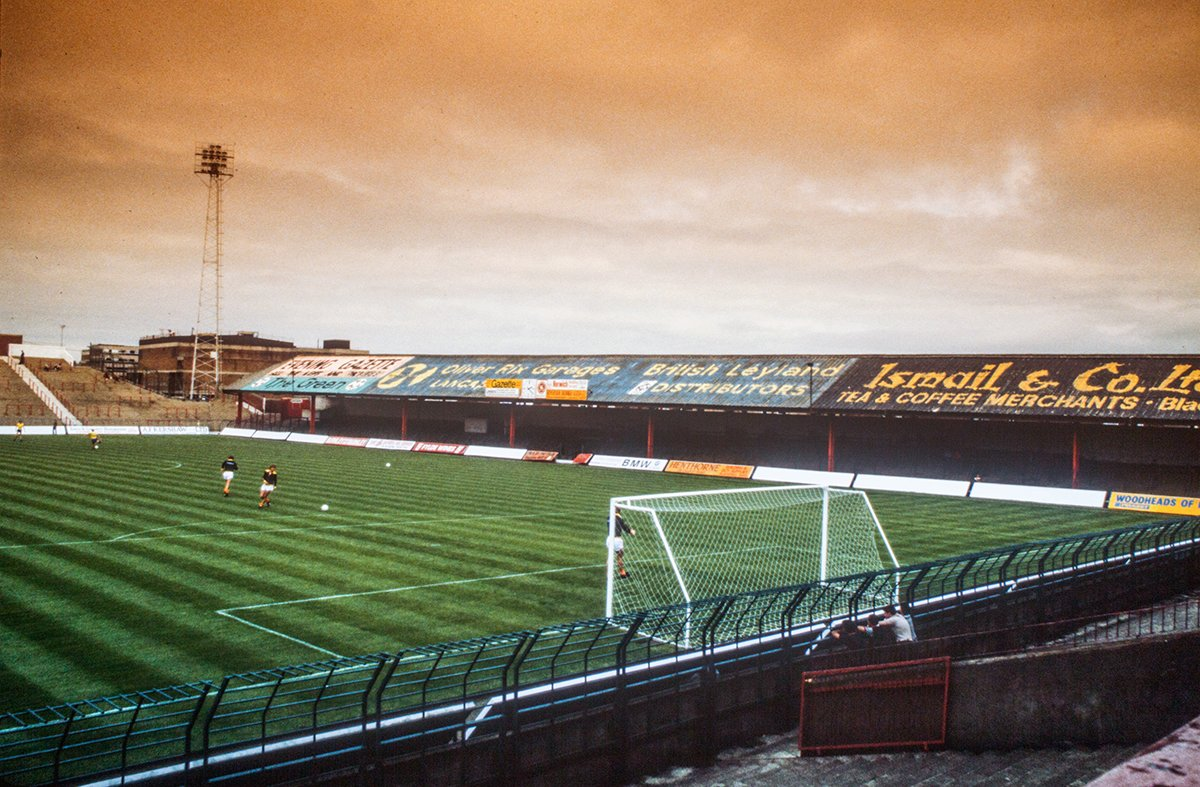
Advertising on the original East Stand in the 1980s

Even in the early days of Bloomfield Road's existence, advertising was in evidence around the ground, with "Winter Gardens", the town's entertainment complex, emblazoned above the southern half of the West Stand.

For around fifty years after Bloomfield Road's 1899 opening, adverts were restricted to hoardings around the ground. Eventually, however, the sloping corrugated-iron roofs of the East and West stands were painted to expand the advertising and, in turn, revenue options. Around 1950, the "Oh Be Joyful" slogan of Dutton's Brewery, based in Blackburn, was painted on the roof of the West Stand. This was replaced in the 1970s by Whitbread's "Whitbread Tankard. Cool, refreshing flavour".

Across the ground, on the East Stand, several advertisements graced the roof of the original structure between the 1950s and the point at which it was demolished. In the mid-1950s, the roof featured three black-on-white adverts; the northern quarter was given over to the Evening Gazette and The Green, while the middle two quarters featured an advert for Harold "The Riley Man of the North" Smith's Premier MG Garage on Bolton Street. The southern portion consisted of an advert asking patrons "Have You Tried Ismail's Tea?", in reference to the town's tea and coffee merchants Ismail & Co. Ltd., located on Birley Street. Above that, on a stanchion attached to the rear slope of the roof, was a billboard for Morrell's Steelworks.

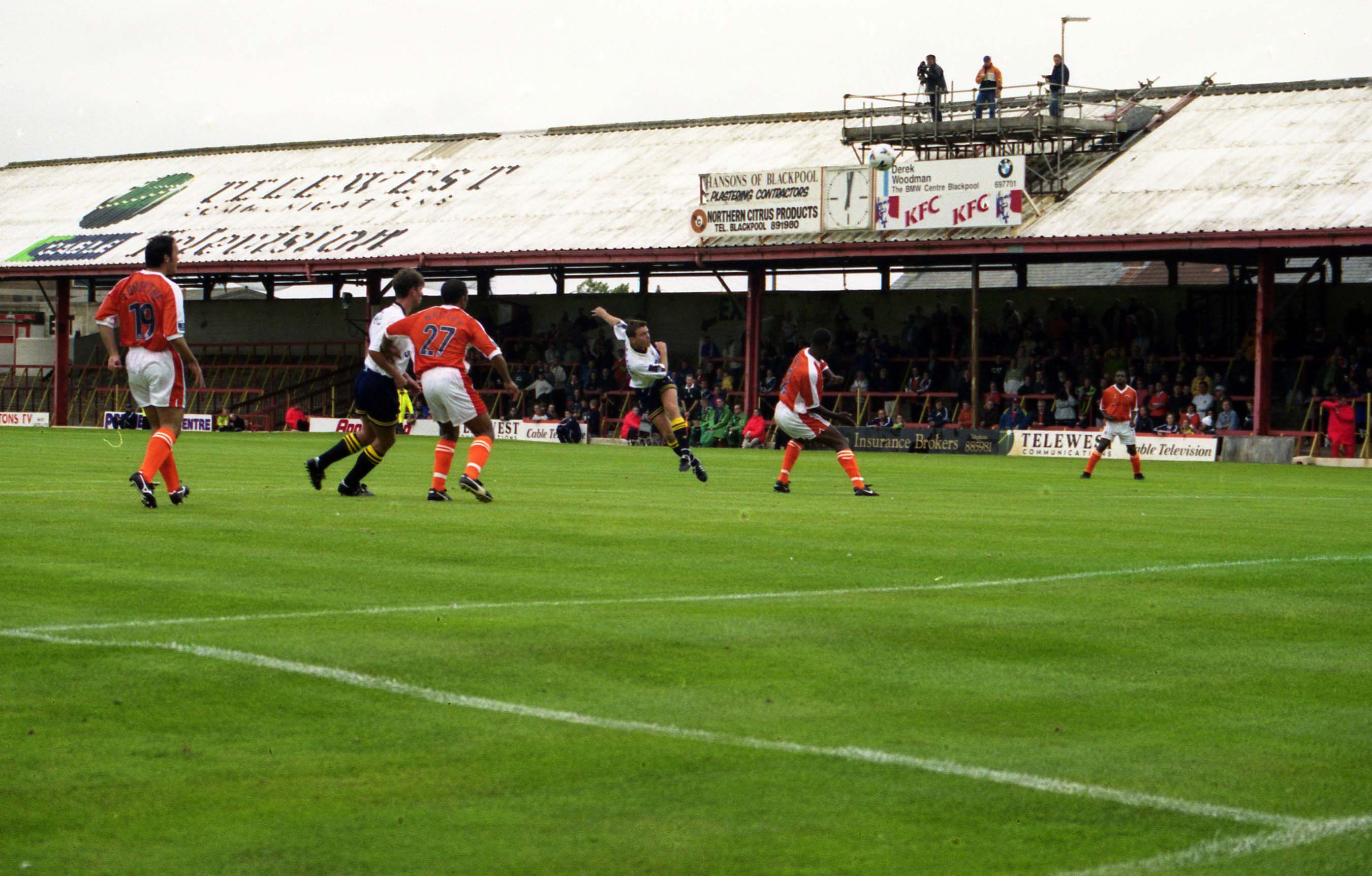
East Stand in 1999

The Evening Gazette and The Green adverts remained until the 1980s; however, that of Harold Smith's garage – which, along with the former two, was repainted in the reverse colours of white-on-black – was halved in length and re-branded "Premier Garage South Shore" in the mid-1960s. The Ismail & Co. Ltd advert, meanwhile, was amended. During the 1969–70 season this was joined, to its northern side, by an advert for Vauxhall & Bedford, which led to the Premier Garage advert being halved in size. Around 1976, the Evening Gazette and The Green paint was changed to black-on-green firstly, then black-on-white, while the Premier Garage and Vauxhall & Bedford sections were repainted to feature an advert for Lancaster-based Oliver Rix's British Leyland Garages in tangerine lettering on a blue background. Ismail & Co. Ltd.'s advert remained.

In the mid-1990s, the entire East Stand roof was painted tangerine and featured, in black lettering, an advert for Coucher & Shaw, a local solicitors company.

The last of these was the club's shirt sponsors between 1997 and 2001 – Telewest. Not long before this, however, the television-camera gantry, which was originally erected on the West Stand, was moved to the East Stand, somewhat negating the effectiveness of Telewest's advert.

After the western half of the Spion Kop was closed to supporters in the 1980s, billboards were introduced on the empty steps.

Prior to the 2021–22 season, the club installed LED pitchside advertising hoardings for the first time.

== Transport ==
Blackpool South railway station is roughly half a mile from Bloomfield Road, although this station is only served by local services. Blackpool North, which is served by services from York and Leeds (via Burnley), Liverpool and Manchester, is over two miles away. The number 11 bus runs from the bus station opposite Blackpool North towards Lytham St Annes. Fans can alight at the Bridge House pub and walk to the ground.

== Concerts ==
Band/artist	Tour	Attendance	Year	Date
Rod Stewart	Outdoor Stadium Tour	20,000	2014	20 June
Neil Diamond	UK Tour	20,000	2015	24 July
UB40	Grand Slam Tour (with Level 42, Original Wailers and Raging Fyah)	15,000	2017	16 June
