= 2002–03 Blackpool F.C. season =

English football club season

Blackpool F.C.
2002–03 season
- Owner: Owen Oyston
- Chairman: Karl Oyston
- Manager: Steve McMahon
- Division Two: 13th
- FA Cup: Third round
- League Cup: First round
- Top goalscorer: League: John Murphy (16); All: John Murphy (19)

The 2002–03 season was Blackpool F.C.'s 95th season (92nd consecutive) in the Football League. They competed in the 24-team Division Two, then the third tier of English league football, finishing thirteenth.

John Murphy was the club's top scorer for the fourth consecutive season, with nineteen goals (sixteen in the league, two in the FA Cup and one in the League Trophy).

== Table ==
Pos	Team	Pld	W	D	L	GF	GA	GD	Pts
11	Peterborough United	46	14	16	16	51	54	−3	58
12	Colchester United	46	14	16	16	52	56	−4	58
13	Blackpool	46	15	13	18	56	64	−8	58
14	Stockport County	46	15	10	21	65	70	−5	55
15	Notts County	46	13	16	17	62	70	−8	55

Rules for classification: In the Football League goals scored (GF) takes precedence over goal difference (GD).
