= 2004–05 Blackpool F.C. season =

English football club season

Blackpool F.C.
2004–05 season
- Owner: Owen Oyston
- Chairman: Karl Oyston
- Manager: Colin Hendry
- League One: 16th
- FA Cup: Third round
- League Cup: First round
- Top goalscorer: League: Scott Taylor (12); All: Scott Taylor (14)

The 2004–05 season was Blackpool F.C.'s 97th season (94th consecutive) in the Football League. It was also their fourth consecutive season in the third tier of English football. They finished in sixteenth place.

Scott Taylor was the club's top scorer for the second consecutive season, with fourteen goals (twelve in the league, one in the FA Cup and one in the League Cup).

It was Colin Hendry's first season as manager, having been hired in June 2004.

== Table ==
| Pos | Team | Pld | W | D | L | GF | GA | GD | Pts |
|---|---|---|---|---|---|---|---|---|---|
| 14 | Walsall | 46 | 16 | 12 | 18 | 65 | 69 | −4 | 60 |
| 15 | Colchester United | 46 | 14 | 17 | 15 | 60 | 50 | +10 | 59 |
| 16 | Blackpool | 46 | 15 | 12 | 19 | 54 | 59 | −5 | 57 |
| 17 | Chesterfield | 46 | 14 | 15 | 17 | 55 | 62 | −7 | 57 |
| 18 | Port Vale | 46 | 17 | 5 | 24 | 49 | 59 | −10 | 56 |

Updated to match(es) played on May 2005. Source: Soccerbase
Rules for classification: 1) points; 2) goal difference; 3) number of goals scored.
