= List of banks in Kyrgyzstan =

This is a list of banks in Kyrgyzstan.

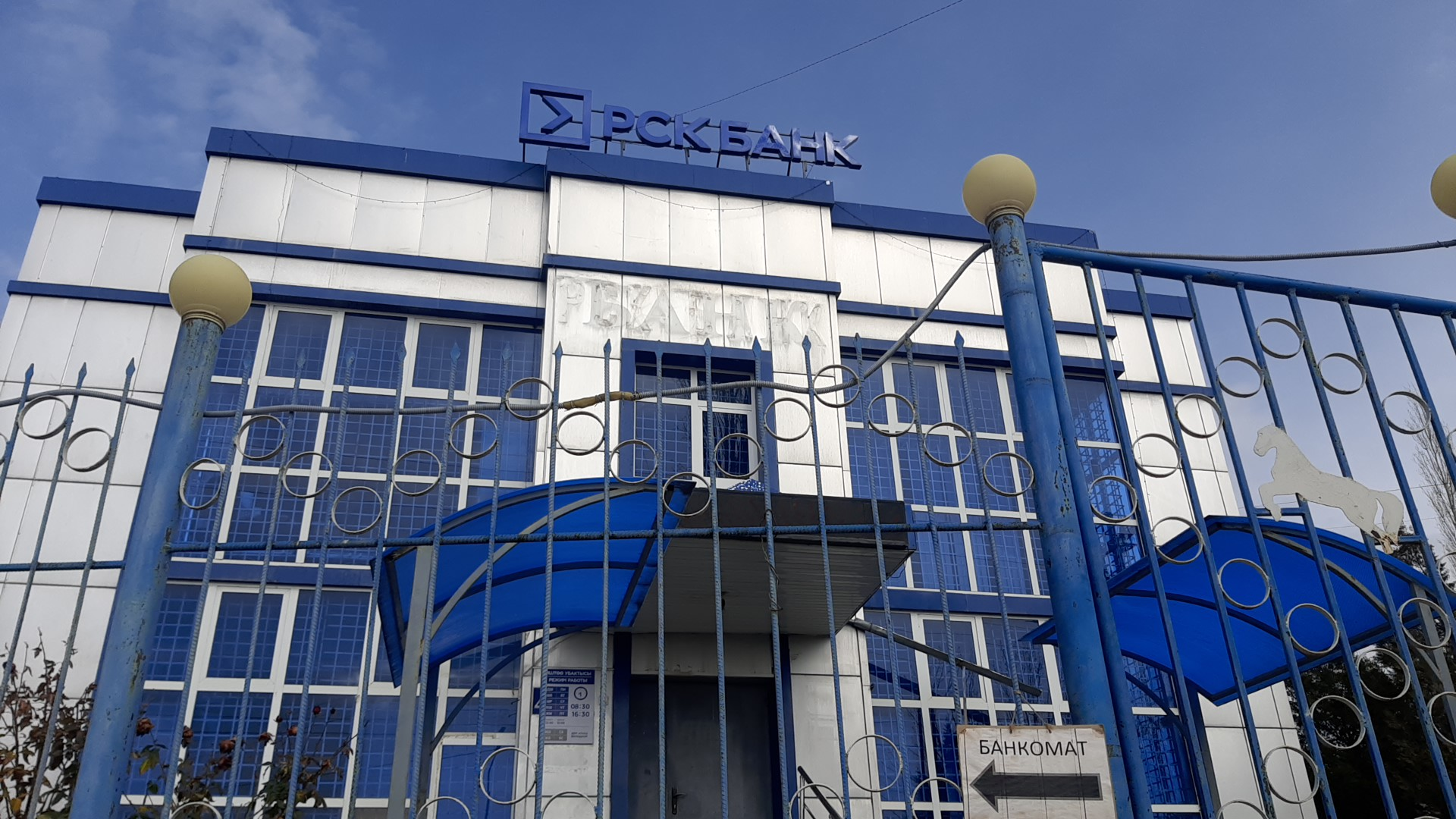
Branch of RSK Bank in the village of Ala-Buka

== Central bank ==
- National Bank of the Kyrgyz Republic

== Commercial banks ==
=== Local banks ===
Bank Name	Local Name	Type	Address	Number of branches	Website
Aiyl Bank	Айыл Банк	OJSC	720040, Bishkek, #14, Logvinenko str.	37	https://www.ab.kg/en/
BAKAI BANK	Бакай Банк	OJSC	720001, Bishkek, #77, Isanov str.	23	https://www.bakai.kg/ru/
Bank of Asia	Азия Банкы	CJSC	720016, Bishkek FEZ, #303 Aitmatov Avenue	9	https://www.bankasia.kg/en/
Capital Bank	Капитал Банк	OJSC	720017, Bishkek, #161, Moskovskaya str.	5	https://www.capitalbank.kg/
Commercial bank KYRGYZSTAN	Коммерциялык Банк КЫРГЫЗСТАН	OJSC	720033, Bishkek, #54a, Togolok Moldo str.	20	https://www.cbk.kg/en
DKIB	Демир Кыргыз Эл Аралык Банкы	CJSC	720001, Bishkek, #245, 2,3 floors, Chui Avenue	14	https://demirbank.kg/en-gb/
Dos-Credobank	Дос-Кредобанк	OJSC	720000, Bishkek, #92, 6 floor Chui Avenue	9	https://www.dcb.kg/en/
EcoIslamicBank	ЭкоИсламикБанк	CJSC	720031, Bishkek, #17, Geologicheski lane	8	https://eib.kg/
Eurasian Savings Bank	Евразиялык Сактык Банкы	OJSC	720021, Bishkek, #40/1, Ibraimov str. – #59/1 Bokonbayev str.	3	https://esb.kg/
FinanceCreditBank	ФинансКредитБанк	OJSC	720021, Bishkek, #105, Abdrahmanov str.	6	http://www.fkb.kg/
Kyrgyzkommertsbank	Кыргызкоммерцбанк	OJSC	720021, Bishkek, #101, Shopokov str.	3	https://kkb.kg/
Kyrgyz Investment and Credit Bank	Кыргыз Инвестициялык Кредит Банкы	CJSC	720040 Bishkek, #21, Erkindik boulevard	17	https://www.kicb.net/welcome/
Rosinbank	Росинбанк	OJSC	720040, Bishkek, #40/4 floor 2-10, Togolok Moldo str.	13	(defunct)
Keremetbank	Керемет Банк	OJSC	720001, Bishkek, 40/4 Togolok Moldo str.	31	https://keremetbank.kg/
Eldik Bank	Элдик Банк	OJSC	720040, Bishkek, #38a, Molodaya Gvardia boulevard	51	https://www.rsk.kg/en?for_who=individual
Tolubay Bank	Толубай Банк	CJSB JSCB	720010, Bishkek, #105, Umetaliev str.	2	https://www.tolubaybank.kg/index.php?lang=en

=== Foreign banks ===
Bank Name	Local Name	Type	Address	Number of branches	Country of Affiliation
Bai-Tushum Bank	Бай-Түшүм Банкы	CJSC	720001, Bishkek, #76, Umetaliev str.	7	ACDI/VOCA, United States Caritas Internationalis, Switzerland
Bishkek branch of the National Bank of Pakistan	Пакистан улуттук банкынын Бишкек филиалы	-	720021, Bishkek, #84, Moskovskaya str.	-	Pakistan
BTA Bank	БТА Банкы	CJSC	720040, Bishkek, #118, Moskovskaya st.	14	Kazakhstan
Chang An Bank	Чанг Ан Банк	OJSC	Bishkek, #48/1, Ahunbaeva str.	-	China
FINCA Bank	ФИНКА Банкы	CJSC	720021, Bishkek, #93/2, Shopokov str.	24	United States
Halyk Bank Kyrgyzstan	Халык Банк Кыргызстан	OJSC	720033, Bishkek, #390, Frunze str.	9	Kazakhstan
Kompanion Bank	Компаньон Банкы	CJSC	Bishkek, 62, Shota Rustaveli str.	17	Mercy Corps, United States
Kyrgyz-Swiss Bank	Кыргыз-Швейцариялык Банк	CJSC	720001, Bishkek, #68, Baytik Baatyr str.	-	Switzerland
Optima Bank	Оптима Банк	OJSC	720070, Bishkek, #493, Jibek Jolu str.	18	ATF Bank, Kazakhstan
Representative office of Interstate Bank in the Kyrgyz Republic	Кыргыз Республикасындагы Мамлекеттер аралык Банктын Өкүлчүлүгү	-	720040, Bishkek, 189a Moskovskaya street	-	CIS
RK AMANBANK	РК АМАНБАНК	OJSC	720040, Bishkek, #249 Tynystanov str.	13	Russia

== Defunct banks ==
Bank Name	Local Name	Type	Address	Outcome
Ak Bank	Ак Банк	OJSC	Bishkek, 203 Chumabek str.	Licence withdrawn
Asia Universal Bank	АзияУниверсалБанк	OJSC	Bishkek, 114 Chui Avenue	Liquidated
Bishkek branch of Central Asia bank of cooperation and Development	ЦАБСиРдин Бишкектеги филиалы	-	Bishkek, # 7, Umetaliev str.	Licence withdrawn
Investbank “Issyk-Kul”	Инвестбанк "Ысык-Көл"	OJSC	Bishkek, 114 Chui Avenue	Liquidated
Manas Bank	Манас Банкы	CJSC	Bishkek, 114 Chui Avenue	Liquidated
