= 2003–04 Blackpool F.C. season =

English football club season

Blackpool F.C.
2003–04 season
- Owner: Owen Oyston
- Chairman: Karl Oyston
- Manager: Steve McMahon
- Division Two: 14th
- FA Cup: Third round
- League Cup: Third round
- Top goalscorer: League: Scott Taylor (16); All: Scott Taylor (27)

The 2003–04 season was Blackpool F.C.'s 96th season (93rd consecutive) in the Football League. It was also their third consecutive season in the third tier of English football. They finished in fourteenth place.

Scott Taylor was the club's top scorer, with 27 goals (sixteen in the league, six in the FA Cup, three in the League Cup and two in the League Trophy).

Shortly after the season's conclusion, Steve McMahon resigned as the club's manager.

== Table ==
Pos	Team	Pld	W	D	L	GF	GA	GD	Pts
12	Barnsley	46	15	17	14	54	58	−4	62
13	Wrexham	46	17	9	20	50	60	−10	60
14	Blackpool	46	16	11	19	58	65	−7	59
15	Oldham Athletic	46	12	21	13	66	60	+6	57
16	Sheffield Wednesday	46	13	14	19	48	64	−16	53

Rules for classification: In the Football League goals scored (GF) takes precedence over goal difference (GD).
