= Valērijs Belokoņs =

Latvian businessman and investor (born 1960)

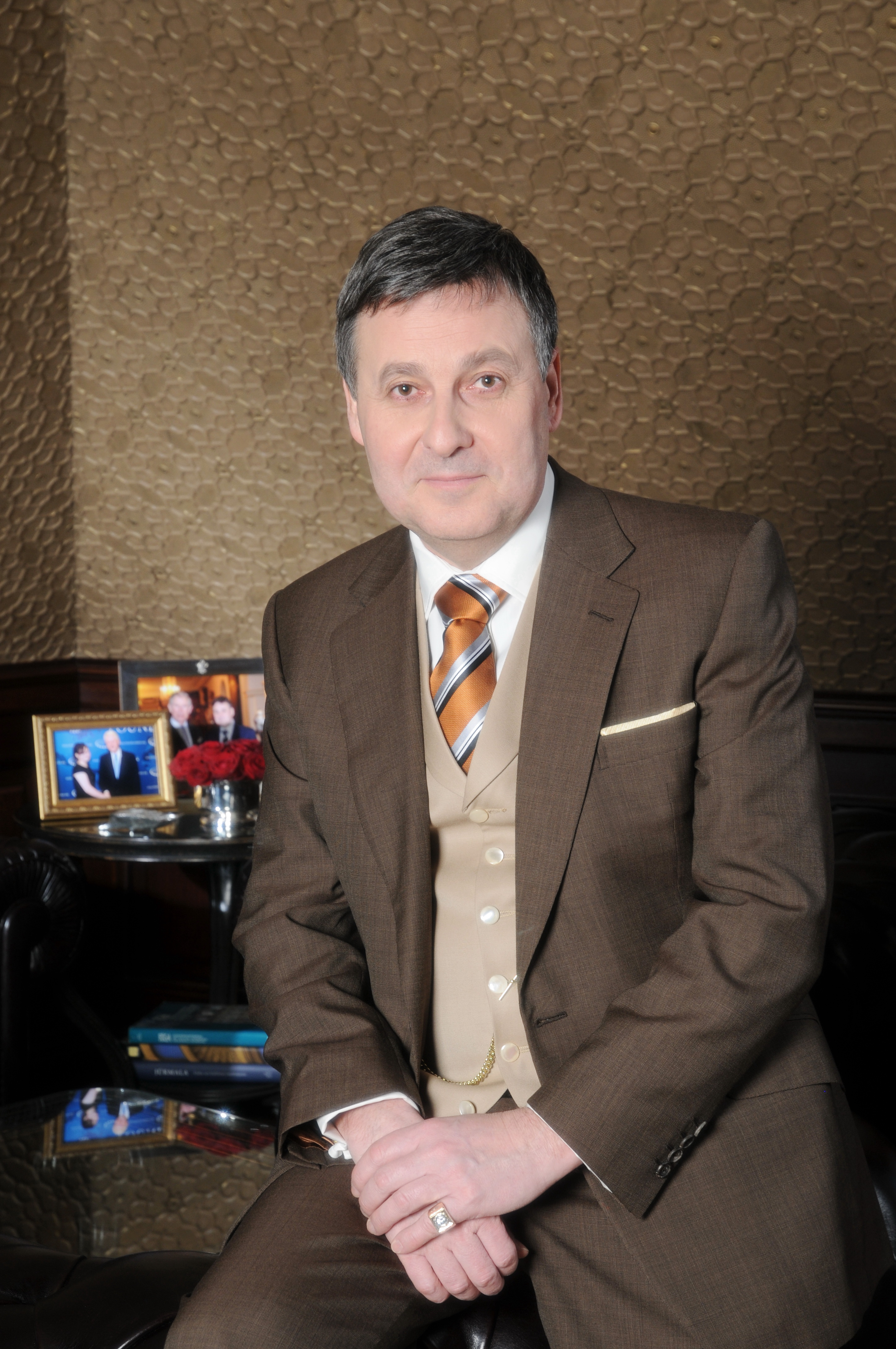
- Belokoņs at Bloomfield Road
- Born: 14 February 1960 (age 66); Riga, Latvian SSR
- Occupations: Businessman, investor (Belokon Holdings)
- Known for: Founder of Baltic International Bank former co-owner of Blackpool F.C. Patron of literature.
- Children: 3

Valērijs Belokoņs or Valeri Belokon (Russian: Валерий Белоконь; born 14 February 1960) is a Latvian businessman. He is a majority shareholder and chairman of the supervisory board of Baltic International Bank; a former co-owner of Blackpool F.C. From 12 January 2010 to 4 June 2013, he served as a Trustee of The Prince's Foundation for Building Community.

For his continuous support of Latvian literature he is well known as Patron of literature.

== Education ==
Born in Riga, when Latvia was a part of the Soviet Union, Belokoņs studied at the University of Massachusetts Amherst (USA) and the University of Latvia, Faculty of Philology.

== Business interests ==
Belokoņs is the chairperson of the supervisory board of Baltic International Bank, and his corporation, Belokon Holdings, has interests in finance, media, the Food industry and social projects in Latvia as well as football in England.

In the 1980s, prior to becoming involved in business, Belokoņs worked as a correspondent in Soviet Youth newspaper in Latvia.

=== Finance and investments ===
- Baltic International Bank – founded in 1993, (Note: Baltic International Bank (BIB) was known as Joint Stock Company "BALTIJAS STARPTAUTISKĀ BANKA" (BSB) (Latvian: Akciju sabiedrība "BALTIJAS STARPTAUTISKĀ BANKA") until 10 June 2003.) servicing VIP customers. Position - founder, main shareholder and chairman of the supervisory board. Representative offices opened in Moscow in 2004, London in 2005, and Kyiv in 2007. In 2020, Belokoņs held a 62.08% stake and his brother Vilorijs (Latvian: Vilorijs Belokoņs) (Note: Vilorijs can be translated as Vilory or Wilory.) held a 32.99% stake. (Note: In 2016, the largest creditor to Boris Berezovsky's estate was Baltic International Bank.) On 11 February 1999, Latvian Industrial Bank became insolvent and, on 23 December 1999, the "BALTIJAS STARPTAUTISKĀ BANKA" (BSB), as Baltic International Bank was known then, gained Lainbanka's assets. (Note: Valts Vīgants and Vilis Dambiņš were the president and the vice-president of Lainbanka, respectively, when Lainbanka went into holding. Lainbanka had a very large number of accounts associated with either Russians or Russian entities.) (Note: Baltic International Bank was involved in the Ukio Bankas Troika laundromat also known as ŪkioLeaks.)
- Maval Aktivi AS - a holding company jointly formed in June 2006 with Maxim Bakiev.
- JSC "Brīvais vilnis" establish 1 December 2014. Formerly known as SIA „BALTIC FINANCE & CAPITAL” until 1 December 2014 when JSC "Brīvais vilnis" gained a 100% stake and on 2 December 2014 SIA „BALTIC FINANCE & CAPITAL” was removed from the register of Latvian companies. On 1 December 2014, the Belokoņs brothers held a 97.25% stake in JSC "Brīvais vilnis". On 11 February 2019, JSC "Brīvais vilnis" became a closed firm and ended trading on the regulated market.
- Manas Bank – formerly Insan Bank (Russian: банка «Инсан») in Bishkek, Kyrgyzstan. Acquired in 2008. Placed in insolvent liquidation on 6 July 2015. Position - Sole owner. On a petition from the Republic of Kyrgyzstan, the Paris Court of Appeal of the French Republic found on 21 February 2017 "that Insan Bank was taken over by [Belokoņs] to develop, in a state where his privileged relations with the holder of economic power guaranteed him the absence of any true monitoring of his activities, money laundering practices which could not have flourished in the less favourable environment of Latvia." Belokoņs and 31 others were indicted by Kyrgyz authorities for alleged money laundering.
- Since 2007: JSC Investment Management Company Global Fondi - co-founded by ex Prime Minister of Latvia, The former Chairman of National Bank of Latvia - Einars Repše.
- Since 2009: JSC Hercogiste - company's aim is to develop sustainable projects in Latvia

=== Media ===
- Otkritij Gorod – a monthly magazine in Baltic countries
- Novo News – a daily Internet newspaper
- Since 1995: Valērijs Belokoņs's Publishing House Ltd – became popular with the National encyclopaedia Latvijas Enciklopēdija and annual edition Who's Who in Latvia.

=== Social Projects ===
- Baltic Institute of Strategic Studies – a non-profit scientific research organization founded in 2004.

== Blackpool F.C. ==
Through Belokoņs Holdings and VB Football Assets, Belokoņs bought a 20% stake in Blackpool Football Club in 2006, and is the club's president. In June 2007 he stated that he was prepared to increase his stake in Blackpool from 20% to 50% following the club's promotion to The Championship.

On 8 July 2008, Belokoņs announced that he and Owen Oyston, the majority share-holder of the club, would be personally financing the construction of the new South Stand and South-west corner at Bloomfield Road, with work to start immediately.

On 31 July 2009, it was announced that Belokoņs was setting up a new transfer fund for Blackpool, into which he was adding a "considerable amount" on 5 August in order to invest in new players identified by team manager Ian Holloway.

On 22 May 2010, Blackpool were promoted to the top tier of English football, the Premier League, one year sooner than Belokoņs had predicted when joining the club in 2006.

In September 2015, Belokoņs initiated legal action against the Oystons, alleging improper use of club funds.

In August 2017, Belokoņs resigned as director of Blackpool. In November 2017, a court determined that Owen Oyston and his son had abused their majority shareholding position at the club in a manner that was detrimental both to the business and Belokoņs. They were ordered to pay £31 million to buy out Belokoņs' share of the business.

Simon Sadler became Blackpool's new owner in June 2019. He acquired a 96.2% stake in the club.

== Personal life ==
Belokoņs has three children.
