= Latvian Industrial Bank =

Defunct Latvian bank

AS Latvian Industrial Bank
- Native name: AS Latvijas Industriālā banka
- Industry: Finance
- Founded: December 17, 1991
- Defunct: December 23, 1999
- Successor: Baltic International Bank
- Headquarters: Riga, Latvia
- Key people: Vilis Dambiņš (president), Valts Vīgants (vice president)
- Products: Financial services

AS Latvian Industrial Bank (Latvian: Akciju sabiedrība «Latvijas Industriālā banka»), also known as "Lainbanka," was a Latvian bank.

== History ==
The bank was founded on December 17, 1991. The banks founders were Vilis Dambiņš, Valts Vīgants and Dzintars Pelcbergs.

In 1995, the Russian Embassy in Latvia sued Lainbanka in the Riga Regional Court, demanding the recovery of 2.9 million lats. The suit ended on February 9, 1998, with a settlement.

== Sponsorship ==
In 1993, Lainbanka became a sponsor of the basketball club BK Barons (at the time called Princips). That year, the club was renamed "LainERS," in honor of the bank.
