= Baltic International Bank =

Defunct bank in Latvia

Baltic International Bank SE
- Type: Societas Europaea
- Industry: Finance
- Founded: 1993; 33 years ago
- Founder: Valērijs Belokoņs
- Defunct: 2024
- Fate: Insolvency
- Headquarters: Riga, Latvia
- Key people: Viktors Bolbats
- Products: financial services
- Net income: −27,065,517 (2022)
- Total assets: 138,742,053 (2022)
- Number of employees: 203 (2022)

Baltic International Bank SE (formerly Baltic International Bank; Latvian: Baltijas Starptautiskā banka) was a Latvian bank, founded in 1993. On December 12, 2022, the bank's financial services were suspended.

At the end of September 2022, the bank's largest shareholders were the bank's founder Valērijs Belokoņs (38.13%) and Vilorijs Belokoņs (21.3%). As of December 2, 2022, the bank had a total of 1,580 clients. By assets, it was the ninth largest bank in Latvia at the end of 2021.
