= Owen Oyston =

English businessman and rapist (born 1934)

- Born: John Owen Oyston; 3 January 1934 (age 92); County Durham, England
- Education: St Joseph's College, Blackpool
- Known for: Blackpool F.C. (owner 1987–2019); Lancashire Life (publisher)
- Criminal charge: Rape and indecent assault of a 16-year-old girl
- Criminal penalty: Six years (served three years and six months; 1996–1999)
- Spouse: Vicki Oyston (1964–1982, 1988—)
- Children: 6, including Karl Oyston

John Owen Oyston (born 3 January 1934) is an English businessman, best known as the former majority owner of Blackpool Football Club, and a convicted sex offender. He was convicted of rape and indecent assault of a 16-year-old girl in 1996. He served three years and six months of a six-year sentence in prison. He was released after a judicial review of the parole board's refusal to grant parole. On 25 February 2019, Oyston and his daughter, Natalie Christopher, were removed from the board of Blackpool F.C.

== Early life ==
John Owen Oyston was born in County Durham, but his family moved to Blackpool when he was two. He was educated at St Joseph's College in the town. He opted out of further education at sixteen and started his career as an actor.

In the 1950s, he moved to London, where he started his business career as a sewing-machine salesman; however, the firm failed. In 1960, he moved home to Blackpool.

== Career ==
=== Estate agent ===
After undertaking various sales jobs based in or around Blackpool, Oyston had considerable success in the 1960s, 1970s and 1980s in the estate agency business. By the mid-1980s Oyston's Estate Agents had become the largest firm of family-owned estate agents in the United Kingdom. In 1987, he sold Oyston's Estate Agents for an estimated £37 million to Royal Insurance, just weeks before the stock market crash.

The sale was complicated by a personal intervention at the annual general meeting of Royal Insurance on 21 April 1988 by Michael Murrin, a political agitator from Preston funded by Sir Peter Blaker, a Conservative MP and rival cable television franchise bidder. Murrin described handling company tax documents stolen from Oyston's Estate Agency to trigger a tax investigation. “The conspirators had stolen the income tax records of their political opponents, a crime never previously recorded in the 200-year history of income tax in Britain.”

On 25 October 1991, Private Eye reported “In the middle of this extraordinary feud is one Michael Murrin, a fish and chip shop owner from Preston. He has now revealed that he was first hired to dig for dirt on Oyston more than 10 years ago by Bill Harrison, a Tory millionaire whose house outside Preston was used by Margaret Thatcher as a helicopter base during Conservative party conferences in Blackpool.”

In April 1992, Esquire stated that the principal source of funds for a seven-year campaign had been William Harrison (1921–1999), a Lancashire property developer. The report by Chris Blackhurst described "a seamy saga of smears, death and vendetta. Or how two Tory MPs, a fish and chip shop owner, and a Blackpool wheeler dealer with a secret grudge tried to ruin a socialist millionaire."

=== Publishing ===
Oyston built up holdings in publishing, including the Lancashire Life series of magazines, before selling them in 2000 to the Archant Publishing Company. He was a major investor in the News on Sunday, a struggling left-wing tabloid newspaper. It had been launched in April 1987 and had been kept afloat during the 1987 general election campaign thanks to the extension of a loan from the Transport and General Workers Union. However, after the election, it went bankrupt and Oyston then bought it outright. Just five months later, in November 1987, it ceased publication.

He was also a major investor in, and chief executive of, Miss World’s international beauty pageant through Trans World Communications until 1991.

=== Radio ===
Oyston had media interests in commercial radio. He was chairman of the Red Rose Group, later to be named Trans World Communications, which owned and launched Red Rose Radio in Preston in October 1982.

The group went on to purchase Radio Aire in Leeds, Red Dragon Radio in Cardiff, and Piccadilly Radio in Manchester. All these stations were subsequently sold to the publishing group Emap. Oyston also acquired The Superstation, which had been set up in 1987 as a central, syndicated overnight sustaining service for independent local radio in the UK. It closed in 1990.

=== Cable networks ===
In the late 1980s, following the liberalisation of the strict regulations governing the provision of cable television in the UK, Oyston – through Oyston Cable Communications Group Limited – won and started to develop, six of the government-granted monopoly broadband franchises, issued by the newly established Cable Authority and covering almost 700,000 households and businesses in the northwest of England. In 1990, when the Baby Bell operating companies saw an opportunity to use cable telephony to gain a foothold in the UK's telecommunication market, Southwestern Bell acquired a majority 80% stake in the Oyston Cable Communications Group.

Oyston's remaining 18% holding was also bought by Southwestern Bell, for £2.99 million, in 1991 (a Statutory Instrument dictated that the remaining 2% holding in Oyston Cable had been vested in Liverpool City Council, on behalf of all the local councils covered by the Oyston franchise areas).)

=== Blackpool F.C. ===
In 1987, Oyston bought a large stake in then-struggling Blackpool F.C., becoming the club's owner on 31 May 1988, when he purchased new shares. His ambitions of a new stadium for the club made headlines throughout much of the 1990s. He attempted to move the home ground to a £100 million development at Whyndyke Farm on Preston New Road, supported by Fylde Borough councillor Paul Hayhurst. After this move failed to work out his ambitions were eventually realised when he invested in a stadium with new stands, restaurants and a 70-bedroom hotel in the club's original location at Bloomfield Road.

In October 1996, Oyston said that he was offered control of Manchester United, but that he refused to desert Blackpool. He commented: "I had the opportunity to buy a controlling interest in Manchester United, but I was not prepared to relinquish my family's interest in Blackpool Football Club. After discussing the matter in detail with the Football League, it was apparent that it would not consider any formula which would allow me to have an interest in both clubs."

Oyston made his first public appearance at Bloomfield Road since his release from prison, in February 2002 at the opening of two new stands at the stadium. He was instrumental in the club bringing in Latvian banker Valeri Belokon (né Valērijs Belokoņs) to invest in the club in 2006. Blackpool were promoted to the Premier League in 2010.

In 2017, the Football League disqualified Belokon from acting as a football club director after learning of a 20-year prison sentence, imposed in 2016 in his absence from Kyrgyzstan, for "money laundering, tax evasion and dishonesty" at his Manas Bank The bank he founded in Latvia, Baltic International Bank SE, was declared insolvent on 24 January 2024.

On 6 November 2017, Oyston and his son, Karl, were found in a high court judgment to have operated an "illegitimate stripping" of Blackpool F.C., paying £26.77 million out of the club to companies they owned. The court found that Oyston and his son had abused their majority shareholding position at the club in a manner that was detrimental both to the business and Belokon. They were subsequently ordered to pay £31 million to buy out Belokons' share of the business, of which more than £25 million along with costs were still owed. Club supporters were hopeful that the amount set by the High Court was so high that the Oyston family would be forced instead to sell its interest. A few days following the court decision, on 10 November, the Oystons decided to put the club up for sale.

Supporters started a subsequently bitterly fought "Oyston Out" campaign, which saw the Oyston family refusing to honour players' contracts and the public display of disrespect from the fans.

Following further legal action by Belokon to obtain payment from Oyston, on 13 February 2019 High Court appointed receiver Paul Cooper, of David Rubin & Partners, removed Oyston from the board of Blackpool Football Club, along with his daughter Natalie Christopher.

== Later career ==
On 10 March 1992, Sir Peter Blaker tabled an early day motion in the House of Commons calling on those responsible for the World in Action report to 'apologise and to improve their ethical standards in future', because of the omission of information such as how Dale Campbell-Savours asked a question about Oyston's company in parliament on 13 July 1988, and tabled a motion about it on 6 July 1988, thus making clear that Oyston's affairs were of interest on both sides of the House of Commons.

In April 1992, Esquire stated that the principal source of funds for the seven-year campaign had been William Harrison (1921–1999), a Lancashire property developer. The report by Chris Blackhurst described "a seamy saga of smears, death and vendetta. Or how two Tory MPs, a fish and chip shop owner, and a Blackpool wheeler dealer with a secret grudge tried to ruin a socialist millionaire."

On 3 July 2023, Oyston was told by a judge to pay the bill for the hotel suite he still occupied at Blackpool F.C.'s Bloomfield Road ground. Blackpool Council have been claiming non-payment of council tax worth more than £3,000.

== Rape case ==
=== Conviction ===
Four months after a high-profile police raid on a modelling agency in Manchester nine charges were levelled against Oyston, including four rape charges. He was initially arrested on 9 February 1995. At the committal in May 1995, one of the alleged rapes and two separate charges of indecent assault were thrown out by a stipendiary magistrate. Charges involving three complainants came to trial. He was cleared of offences against two women but found guilty of the rape and indecent assault of the third complainant.

At his first trial in Manchester in February 1996 for the rape and indecent assault of a former model, he was acquitted of indecent assault but the jury could not reach a verdict on the rape charge. At the retrial, he was acquitted of the rape charge after the former model was shown to have lied at the first trial and that Oyston had had a long-term relationship with her both before and after the alleged rape. She also admitted that it was only after being contacted by police officers investigating the model agency that she felt compelled to speak out having previously made no allegation against Oyston.

A second rape trial in Manchester in March 1996 saw Oyston acquitted after it was shown that the model had taken money from him, enjoyed a consensual affair with him and continued to meet him socially after the alleged rape.

A third trial at Liverpool Crown Court began in April 1996, including both the retrial of an earlier rape case and the trial of the allegations of rape and indecent assault made by a third complainant. The third complainant had originally said she was raped at Oyston's home on a night between October and December 1991 but seven days into the third trial the judge agreed to a request from the Crown and allowed the indictment period to be extended by 12 months, to run from 4 October 1991, to 31 December 1992. The woman had made no complaint in that period and notes from her first police interview had been lost. She had been between 16 and 17 years old in the indictment period. Oyston denied having any intercourse with her. After failing at first to reach a verdict, the jury eventually found Oyston guilty of rape and indecent assault. He was jailed for six years on 22 May.

During the trial, Oyston also claimed he was the victim of a long-running conspiracy by two government ministers, and that a "very nasty campaign" had been waged against him for up to 12 years. Oyston claimed that at one time he was being investigated by the Fraud Squad, the Inland Revenue, the Drugs Squad, the City's regulatory takeover body Imro, international private investigators, The Sunday Times and other newspapers. He told his defence counsel, Anthony Scrivener QC, that he had been cleared of wrongdoing. In 1989, he won substantial damages, costs and an apology from The Sunday Times. He also distributed a 72-page glossy booklet, "The Oyston file", detailing the allegations to reporters at his trial.

=== Appeal ===
Following his conviction, Oyston continued to maintain his innocence, claiming that he had been framed in an elaborate conspiracy involving business rivals and government ministers. Doubt was cast on the validity of his conviction as well as the case and the police investigation. Questions were raised in the House of Commons, particularly by Labour MP Dale Campbell-Savours who brought the matter up a number of times from January 1998 onwards. He brought the matter up again in the House of Lords in 2003.

In December 1997, at the Court of Appeal in London, the conviction was upheld and Oyston's appeal against his six-year jail sentence was dismissed. He was ordered to pay £100,000 court costs. The Radio Authority then ruled that he was not a fit person to own a radio station and wrote to the four stations in which he was known to have a controlling interest: The Bay (North Lancashire and South Cumbria), Radio 1521 (County Armagh, Northern Ireland), Goldbeat (Cookstown, Northern Ireland) and City Beat 96.7 (Belfast), saying that Oyston should not hold the licences. He was forced to relinquish control as each of the radio stations stood to lose its licence should he retain a controlling interest. He also stood down as chairman of Blackpool F.C. In March 1999 his victim brought a civil action against Oyston, claiming £500,000 for psychological damage, which he settled out of court. In April 1999 a parole panel rejected his application for parole because he had not completed the Sex Offenders Treatment Programme from which he had been excluded by his refusal to admit his own guilt.

=== Release from prison ===
After serving three years and six months in prison, Oyston was released on parole on 7 December 1999. After a judicial review of the Parole Board's refusal, Mr Justice Hooper found on 14 October 1999 that the board had acted unlawfully by denying an early release because Oyston would not admit the crime. The rule had been applied as a "catch 22".

Under normal parole terms, Oyston would have been due for release in May 1999. Still maintaining his innocence, he was released from Wealstun Prison in West Yorkshire on 7 December. He was enrolled on the sex offenders' register as part of the conditions of release. All he said in public on his release was, "I am pleased to be going home but there will be no celebrations until my name is cleared." He also repeated allegations of a conspiracy, claiming police had been told by a businessman in the West Midlands three months before his arrest that he had paid £5,000 to a woman to "set Owen up". He also unsuccessfully appealed to the European court for his conviction to be overturned.

In the 12 months after his release, he was not seen in public and became a recluse in his home at Claughton Hall, Lancashire.

On 29 June 2001 Oyston spoke publicly for the first time since his release. He vowed to fight to clear his name, saying "The fact that the media haven't caught up with me until now doesn't mean I have been hiding. I’m still fighting to clear my name. Shortly a judgement will be made in Europe about my case. I won't stop fighting to clear my name. I will eventually." The appeal was rejected by the European Court of Human Rights on 22 January 2002 as "manifestly ill-founded". They ruled that it was a fair hearing and that fresh evidence adduced by Oyston in the rape case which was refused by the Court of Appeal was inadmissible. They stated that "there was no reason to reach a different conclusion in the present case."

Oyston was the subject of controversy again in 2007 when he was invited by Sir Alex Ferguson and former sports minister Richard Caborn to a Labour Party fundraising event in the new Wembley Stadium and attended by the newly appointed Prime Minister Gordon Brown. Oyston attended the event and subscribed for two tables of guests. After BBC Newsnight screened Oyston's arrival at the stadium, a spokesman for Gordon Brown said, "Mr Brown did not meet Mr Oyston, nor was he aware of his presence in advance. Mr Brown has asked the general secretary of the Labour Party to investigate the circumstances, but he has already instructed him that any donation from Mr Oyston should not be accepted."

== Personal life ==
Oyston married Vicki Burns in 1964. They have two sons, one of whom, Karl, was the chairman of Blackpool F.C., and three daughters. Owen and Vicki divorced in 1982 but remarried in 1988. Oyston also has a fourth daughter, Natalie Christopher, who became chair of Blackpool F.C. in 2018.

On 13 June 2008, a fire broke out at his 16th-century country home Claughton Hall. The fire started in an outbuilding and more than 20 firefighters fought the blaze, which they said could have been far more serious had the alarm been raised later.
