= Lancashire Life =

- Lancashire Life Cover – January 2008
- Editor: Chantelle Dietz
- Categories: Regional
- Frequency: Monthly
- Founded: 1947; 79 years ago
- Company: Newsquest Media Group
- Country: United Kingdom
- Language: English
- Website: lancashirelife.co.uk

Lancashire Life is a British monthly regional magazine, first published in 1947, devoted to the English county palatine of Lancashire. The magazine is part of Newsquest Media Group. It covers lifestyle topics including motoring, property, food, art and everyday life in the county. In 2015 it was awarded the Prolific North Awards in the magazines category.

== Circulation ==
Audited circulation was reported as being 163,996 copies for the period 1 January to 31 December 2006. It was 20,199 copies monthly for 2014.

In 2019, monthly readership was 35,093.
