= Blackpool Gazette =

English evening newspaper based in Blackpool, Lancashire

The Blackpool Gazette
- Type: Daily newspaper (excluding Sundays)
- Format: Local newspaper
- Owner(s): National World
- Editor: Vanessa Sims
- Founded: 1873
- Political alignment: Neutral
- Headquarters: 89 Caxton Road, Fulwood, Preston
- Circulation: 2,555 (as of 2023)
- Website: blackpoolgazette.co.uk

The Blackpool Gazette (locally marketed as simply The Gazette) is an English daily newspaper based in Blackpool, Lancashire. Published every day except Sunday, it covers the towns and communities of the Fylde coast. It was founded as The West Lancashire Evening Gazette in 1929 before being renamed the Evening Gazette, and then Blackpool Gazette. The paper's history dates back to a weekly publication founded in 1873.

== Background ==
The newspaper is published by National World, and is known locally as The Gazette. The editor is Vanessa Sims. Two other weekly newspapers are also published – the Lytham St.Annes Express and the Fleetwood Weekly News. It is online at blackpoolgazette.co.uk.

The Gazette had a close link with local football club Blackpool until the club's relegation from the Premier League in 2011. In 2014, the newspaper decided to scrap club chairman Karl Oyston's weekly column "given such disgusting and offensive comments" he made to a Blackpool fan. Oyston's response was to stop recognising The Gazette as local media, instead only allowing them to attend national news conferences. The Oystons left the club in 2019.
