= Manas Bank =

Manas Bank is a commercial bank in Kyrgyzstan currently in insolvent liquidation.

It was established in 2008 by Latvian banker Valērijs Belokoņs, who In 2007 acquired then insolvent Kyrgyz commercial bank Insan Bank, and renamed it as Manas Bank. Manas Bank started its operations from 1 January 2008, offering a range of corporate and retail banking services. However, within 28 months, on 8 April 2010, following a regime change in the Kyrgyz Republic, the Kyrgyz National Bank placed Manas Bank under its administration to investigate money laundering. Contrary to some reports, Manas Bank was never nationalised by the Kyrgyz government. While continuing to formally belong to Valērijs Belokoņs, on 6 July 2015, Manas Bank was placed into insolvent liquidation.

In August 2011, Belokoņs pursued international arbitration against the Kyrgyz Republic claiming that the government's interference with Manas Bank amounted to “expropriation” of the bank. On 24 October 2014, the arbitral tribunal awarded Belokoņs a US$15 million compensation (plus legal costs) for the “expropriation” of Manas.

However, upon Kyrgyz Republic's appeal, on 21 February 2017 the Paris Court of Appeal annulled the arbitral award finding that Belokons had bought Manas Bank “in order to develop … money-laundering practices”. The court said such money laundering would not be monitored in Kyrgyzstan because of Belokoņs's “privileged” relationship with Maxim Bakiyev, the son of the then President of Kyrgyzstan. The court further held that the arbitral award must be annulled because to allow its enforcement would reward Belokoņs for “criminal activities”, which would be contrary to French international public policy.

In particular, the court found that after Belokoņs took over Manas Bank, $5.2bn flowed through its accounts in less than three years, and concluded this “dazzling success” in a poor country “cannot be explained by orthodox banking practices”. Bank records presented to the court showed that client accounts had been opened in the names of people whose identification documents, including passport details, had been stolen. One Manas Bank client, New-Zealand-registered company Lakerock Contracts Ltd, had $534m go through its account in nine months. Examination of the company's registration documents found the named company head, and sole signatory for the multimillion-dollar account, was a taxi driver in Belarus. When interviewed on request by the Belarus police, he told officers he had never signed any of the documents and knew nothing about Manas Bank or Lakerock. Another company BMD Commerce, had $24m through its account in a year, including multimillion-dollar physical cash deposits and withdrawals. The authorised account holder on the Manas Bank forms was a resident of Latvia. Latvian police and Kyrgyz border records showed this person to be a 20-year-old man who had never been to Kyrgyzstan. Subsequently, the investigation found he was serving a prison sentence in Latvia when much of the account activity was taking place.

The Paris court of appeal concluded in its judgment that Manas Bank “was taken over by Mr Belokon in order to develop, in a state where his privileged relations with the holder of economic power guaranteed him the absence of any true monitoring of his activities, money-laundering practices which could not have flourished in the less favourable environment of Latvia.”

Belokoņs appealed the judgment to the French Supreme Court on 12 May 2017 but Belokoņs's appeal was dismissed by the Supreme Court on 12 July 2018.
