= Karl Oyston =

English businessman

- Born: Karl Samuel Oyston; 20 February 1968 (age 58)
- Occupation: Businessman
- Known for: Chairman of Blackpool F.C. (1999–2018)
- Spouse: Victoria Oyston
- Parent(s): Owen Oyston; Vicki Oyston

Karl Samuel Oyston (born 20 February 1968) is an English businessman and the former chairman of Blackpool Football Club. Oyston took over the chairmanship at Blackpool from his mother, Vicki Oyston, in 1999. Mrs Oyston had taken over three years earlier when her husband Owen, Karl's father, was jailed for six years in 1996 for rape and indecent assault. The Sunday Times Rich List listed the Oystons' wealth at £100 million.

At the time of Oyston's appointment, Blackpool were in the third tier of the Football League. At the end of the following 1999–2000 campaign, they were relegated to the bottom tier. At the first time of asking, they returned to the Second Division, where they remained for the next six seasons. In 2007 they were promoted to the second tier. Three years later, after financial backing from new club president Valērijs Belokoņs, Blackpool were, for the first time, promoted to the Premier League. After this promotion, Belokoņs was frozen out of day-to-day involvement, he claims because the Oystons no longer needed his financial backing.

Blackpool remained in the top tier for one campaign, and after failing to return from the Championship at the first attempt, they have finished no higher than 15th, with Oyston employing four different managers since 2013. In 2015, Blackpool were relegated to the third tier for the first time since 2007. The following season saw a second-successive relegation, to the bottom tier of English professional football for the first time in fifteen years.

Oyston had a poor relationship with Blackpool's fans, mostly after the club's relegation from the Premier League, due to a perceived lack of funding. The relationship was described as being "at breaking point" by Tim Fielding, the chair of the Blackpool Supporters Trust, in December 2014.

Fielding resigned from his position the following month after the Oystons began legal action against him for comments he made on the internet, even though it was revealed that Karl Oyston had labelled Blackpool fan Stephen Smith a "massive retard" and an "intellectual cripple" in a text-message exchange two months earlier. The local newspaper, the Blackpool Gazette, subsequently decided to scrap Oyston's weekly column "given such disgusting and offensive comments". He was later charged with misconduct by the Football Association, a charge he appealed. The appeal was rejected by a tribunal, and he was given a ban from all footballing activities for six weeks and fined £40,000.

On 6 November 2017, the Oystons were found in a High Court judgement to have operated an "illegitimate stripping" of Blackpool F.C., paying £26.77 million out of the club to companies they owned. The Oystons decided to put the club up for sale following the judgement.

On 2 February 2018, Oyston rescinded his role as chairman of the football club. After going into receivership, local businessman Simon Sadler purchased the football club in 2019.

== Blackpool F.C. ==
Until 1999, Oyston spent much of his time involved in running the Oyston family businesses, including property management, farming interests and publishing.

On 3 April 1999, Oyston took over as chairman of Blackpool, becoming the third member of the Oyston family to occupy the role, after his father and mother, Vicki, from whom he inherited the role. Initially he took over the role of managing director, following the resignation of both the previous managing director, Gill Bridge, and Vicki Oyston, who had resigned as chairman following what was described as "an ugly 'Oyston Out' demonstration by fans at the stadium". Oyston had been handed control of the club by his father, who was, at the time, still serving a prison sentence for rape. Oyston stated that his mother had quit to give him a level playing field and let him run the club his way after his father had promised he would not seek to take over again upon his release.

In July 2005, Oyston was elected onto the Football League board of directors as a representative of League One, and in June 2006 was elected back onto the board.

In September 2006, after an undercover investigation into illicit payments in football on the BBC Panorama current affairs documentary series, Oyston claimed that he had been offered bungs by football agents, saying "I've been offered cash as a bribe to bring a player to the club and it's happened more than once. In one instance, someone wanted me to take a player on a higher salary than we would normally pay, so he offered me a certain amount of cash as a gift to get me to do it. I said no and it didn't take any time whatsoever to reach that decision. Since 1999 when I became chairman here, my managers have been offered bungs. We've missed out on a lot of footballers because of it and that is one of my biggest concerns. It is very disturbing and in the Premiership where there are huge, huge deals taking place, it is a major problem." The Football Association asked Oyston, and others who made similar claims, to name the agents concerned, saying that they had a duty to provide evidence.

On 26 January 2010, Oyston was elected to the Football League board of directors as a representative of the Championship in a ballot for the vacant position, but had to leave this post at the end of the season following Blackpool's promotion to the Premier League.

In August 2010, Oyston offered to stand down as chairman of the club, stating his belief that he has a different approach to the rest of the Premier League chairmen and the difficulties of dealing with top-flight players and their agents. Oyston said: "The more I speak to other people at other clubs, the more I realise I am a lone voice. There was some support for things I did and said in the Championship but there doesn't seem to be any in this division ... We are the ones who are the employers. We are the ones offering the terms and the contracts. It is up to us how we go about things. I don't think any deal should be about the agent. It should be about the player, and about giving the player a platform under a wonderful manager to perform on one of the best footballing stages in the world. Agents are sometimes denying their clients that chance."

On 18 August, he stood down as both chairman and director of the club with immediate effect, although he remained as Acting Chief Executive. It was subsequently reported that he had been made bankrupt on that date, which would have prevented him acting as chairman due to Premiership rules. The bankruptcy order was annulled on 12 October. Oyston returned to his role as chairman in 2011.

On 2 February 2018, Oyston again resigned from his role as chairman of the football club after an alleged rift with his father.

=== Management style ===
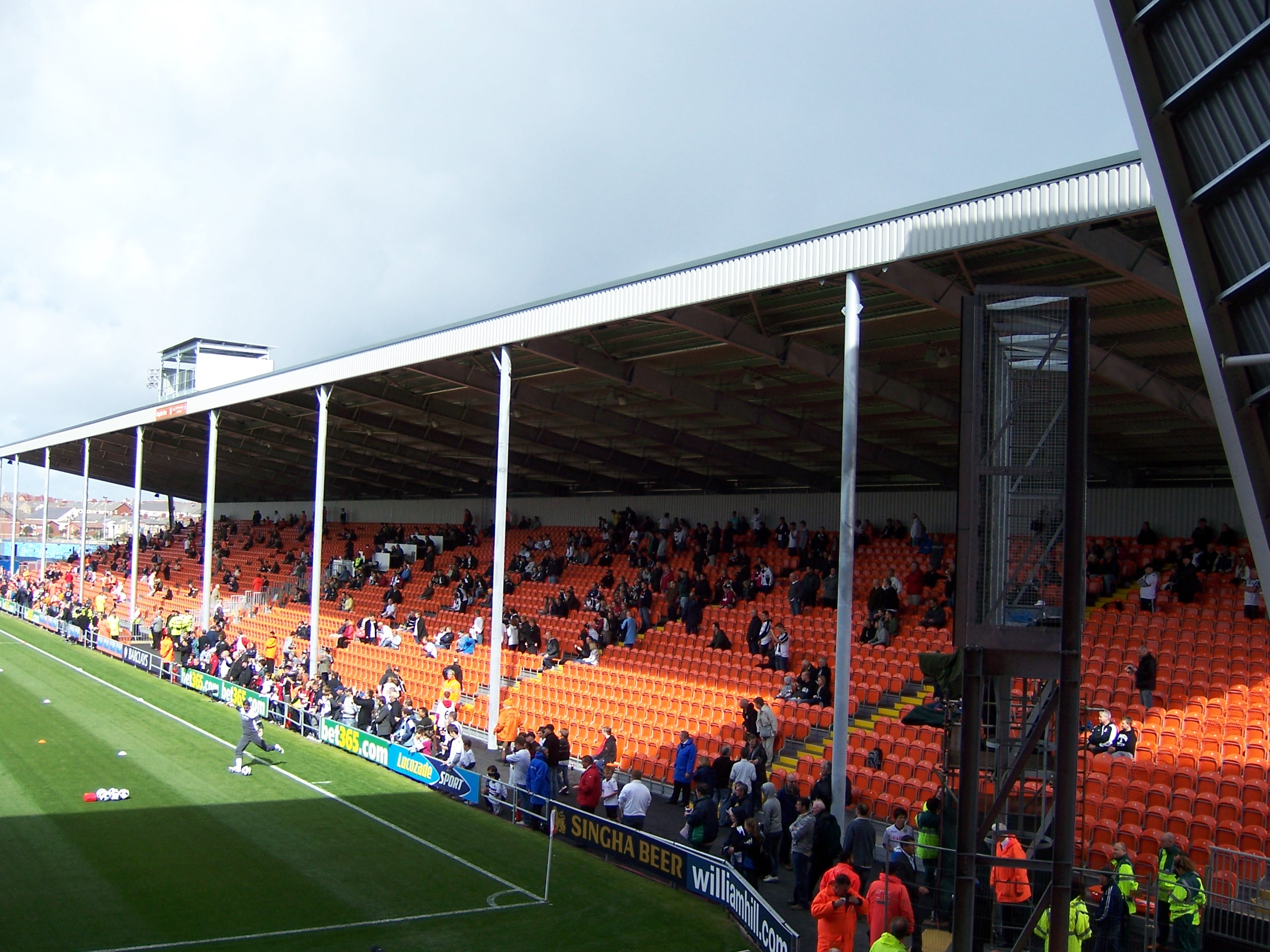
Bloomfield Road's temporary East Stand, erected in 2010 to bring the ground up to code for the club's debut in the Premier League.

Bloomfield Road's South Stand was demolished in 2003. On 14 January of that year, Karl Oyston promised the redevelopment of the stand would go ahead but insisted he would not be pressured into making any rash decisions. Five years later, after no sign of building work became a source of controversy, Oyston stated: "The South will be built as and when it is right for the football business. I know we need to progress as a club and it is top of our agenda, believe me, but it wasn't right to do it now." He also confirmed that the club had no immediate plans to start building the stand. The stand was officially opened in March 2010.

In 2012, Oyston was fined more than £40,000 for illegally dumping waste from the building of the new stand. Hundreds of tonnes of rubble were found at Whyndyke Farm, despite there not being a permit to do so. Oyston pleaded guilty to two breaches of laws made to protect the environment.

In August 2010, nearly three months after their promotion to the Premier League, Blackpool's players received their bonuses, reported to be £400,000 each. Charlie Adam took Karl Oyston to court that October over the non-payment of a £20,000 bonus, which was tied to a $5-million promotion bonus after the club attained Premier League status. Adam won the case.

During the 2012–13 season, the state of the Bloomfield Road pitch was criticised by managers and players. It was re-laid during the following close season, but in December 2014 it began to deteriorate again. In February 2015, the Football League contacted the club, demanding an explanation for the current condition of the pitch. The pitch was relaid during the summer of 2015.

Former Scotland captain Barry Ferguson, who was Blackpool's caretaker-manager from January to May 2014, said of Oyston in 2020: "He's crazy, man. Six months before [his appointment], I fell out with him, and he made me go and train with the youth team at a 5-a-side park. And then, six months later, he offered me the job. That's how crazy he was. And sometimes he would come in and talk to you; other times, he'd just walk past you."

=== Relationship breakdown ===
In April 2014, with Blackpool flirting with relegation to the third tier for the second consecutive season, Oyston called for the police to investigate death threats aimed at him and his family. Fans had begun protesting at games, calling for Oyston to leave the club after failing to provide the necessary funding for the club's infrastructure, despite the club having received an estimated £80 million cash windfall after their victory over Cardiff City at Wembley. To compound the ill-feeling, Oyston paid his father £11 million, distributed another £26 million around other Oyston-owned companies, and purchased land owned by the club behind the stadium for £650,000, which was then sold back to the club for £6.5 million after a lease for a Travelodge had been secured.

The death threats came a few weeks after Oyston was photographed, by his son, standing in a mocking manner beside a mobile billboard that was parked on Bloomfield Road. It referred to the football club as "Oyston's cash cow". His son then posted the photograph on his Twitter account.

On 24 July, in an open letter to both Oystons, club president Valeri Belokon demanded funds be put aside for player acquisitions.

Oyston's penchant for signing players via the loan market or on free transfers instead of paying transfer fees was highlighted during the 2014–15 season, before which 27 players had departed.

In July 2014, Channel 4 News aired an investigation into the club's finances. In it, forensic accountant John Frenkel states: "It has the appearance that the club is being run purely for the benefit of Mr Oyston”.

In December 2014, after Blackpool, then bottom of The Championship, lost 6–1 at home to AFC Bournemouth, Oyston made headlines for allegedly calling one of the club's supporters, among other denigrations, a "retard" in a text message. The following day, the Blackpool Gazette decided to scrap Oyston's weekly column "given such disgusting and offensive comments". Oyston issued an apology later that day, via the club's website, but club president Valeri Belokon called for Oyston to quit on the back of the incident. Three months later, Oyston was charged with misconduct by the FA. His appeal against the FA ruling was rejected on 1 June, and he was banned from all footballing activities for six weeks and fined £40,000. In one of the texts, Oyston stated that he was on "a never-ending nightmare revenge mission", in response to the threats made against his family. The following month, the Oystons took legal action against 32-year-old Blackpool fan David Ragozzino for comments made against them on an internet forum. Ragozzino was given 21 days to respond to a claim for damages from the club.

A few days later, Owen Oyston issued an open letter to address claims made against him and his family.

On 30 January 2015, another Blackpool fan, Stephen Sharpe, agreed to make a £5,000 donation to the club's Community Trust in lieu of damages and legal costs after posting defamatory messages about the Oystons on a website forum the previous year.

The following day, prior to the game against Brighton at Bloomfield Road, and during a planned protest against the club's owners, a Land Rover with the number plate OY51 OUT was parked in the ground's car park. It was believed to be owned by Karl Oyston and fans claimed that it was used to antagonise them further.

In early February 2015, the Oystons confirmed they were seeking another £150,000 in damages from Paul Crashley, the owner of the website Back Henry Street, over "six allegedly defamatory comments made in 2014". This action was subsequently lost after it was struck out by the court in December 2016.

On 24 March, the Tangerine Knights handed in an open letter to Owen Oyston calling for, amongst other things, his son to be relieved of his duties as club chairman and the Oyston family to sell the club.

In April 2015, the Oystons sued a third fan for libelling them on Facebook. Frank Knight, a 67-year old retired businessman later apologised on his Facebook page: “I now regret making these allegations, I fully accept that they are false and I wish to sincerely apologise for them." After Knight had agreed to pay £20,000 damages, the television personalities Russell Brand and Rachel Riley led a public appeal, raising £20,915 to cover the damages. The club issued a statement shortly thereafter, warning of further legal action against people who, they claim, make false statements against them.

In May 2016, Oyston won £30,000 in libel damages from Blackpool supporter Stephen Reed.

=== Asset-stripping claim ===
In 2015, the Oystons also took action against Tim Fielding, the former chair of Blackpool Supporters Trust. Fielding resigned his position after the Oystons took exception to comments he made on fan websites and social media. He referred to the family as having "asset stripped" the club; as having "misappropriated football generated funds"; and as having made large personal profits by buying assets from the club at one price and then selling the same assets back to the club at a substantially increased price. "I now regret the allegations and unreservedly withdraw [them]."

On 6 November 2017, in a high court judgement, Karl and his father Owen Oyston was found to have operated an "illegitimate stripping" of Blackpool F.C., paying £26.77 million out of the club to companies they owned. They were ordered to pay £31 million for the share of the minority shareholder Valeri Belokon, who invested £4.5 million for a 20% stake in Blackpool in 2006 and challenged the legitimacy of the payment the Oystons made to their own companies in the high court. Following the judgement, on 10 November, the Oystons decided to put the club up for sale.

=== Managerial appointments ===
Blackpool had ten full-time managers under Karl Oyston's chairmanship. On average, he appointed a new manager every 1.6 years. Sacked were Colin Hendry, Paul Ince and José Riga; the other seven left of their own volition.

Name	From	To	Days in charge
Steve McMahon	7 January 2000	6 June 2004	1,612
Colin Hendry	7 June 2004	10 November 2005	521
Simon Grayson	5 August 2006	23 December 2008	871
Ian Holloway	21 May 2009	3 November 2012	1,262
Michael Appleton	7 November 2012	11 January 2013	65
Paul Ince	18 February 2013	21 January 2014	337
José Riga	11 June 2014	27 October 2014	138
Lee Clark	29 October 2014	9 May 2015	192
Neil McDonald	2 June 2015	18 May 2016	351
Gary Bowyer	1 June 2016	6 August 2018	796

== Personal life ==
On 19 February 2011, Oyston married his partner, Victoria, at Christ Church in Over Wyresdale, near Lancaster. He has two sons.
