= Danny Coid =

English footballer

Personal information
- Full name: Daniel John Coid
- Date of birth: 3 October 1981 (age 45)
- Place of birth: Liverpool, England
- Height: 5 ft 11 in (1.80 m)
- Position: Defender

Youth career
- 1995–1998: Blackpool

Senior career*
Years	Team	Apps	(Gls)
1998–2011	Blackpool	316	(10)
2010–2011	→ Rotherham United (loan)	9	(0)
2011–2012	Accrington Stanley	21	(1)
2013–2015	Kendal Town		
2015–	Ashton Town		
- * Club domestic league appearances and goals as of 22:31, 10 May 2012 (UTC)

Daniel John Coid (born 3 October 1981) is an English former professional footballer.

== Career ==
=== Blackpool ===
Born in Liverpool, Merseyside, Coid started his career with Blackpool in 1995 as 14-year-old . He then signed a 2-year YTS before making his professional Debut at Bloomfield road in the 1998/99 season. He signed his 1st professional contract with the Seasiders in 2000.

He was part of the Blackpool team that won promotion from the Third Division by winning the play-off final in 2000–01. On 25 March 2002, he signed a new two-year contract, with an option for a further two years. He scored in the final of the 2003–04 Football League Trophy, as Blackpool won the competition for the second time in three years, beating Southend United 2–0. In September 2002, the Sunday Mirror newspaper claimed that Coid was being watched by scouts from Liverpool, with them having seen every home match he had played up to that point in 2002–03, with Ron Yeats regularly at Bloomfield Road. However, late in the season, and after being a regular starter in the first team, he signed a new two-year contract on 24 March 2003, with an option for two more years at Blackpool. Coid said of the decision to sign the new contract, "I am pleased to have signed, I can now concentrate on my football. I never wanted to leave and I am delighted to have everything sorted out."

In the 2003–04 season, Coid scored three goals in as many games in one week for the Seasiders. The first came on 17 January 2004 in a 3–0 win over Wycome Wanderers at the Causeway Stadium in the Second Division; the second came three days later in the Northern area semi-final of the Football League Trophy at Bloomfield Road when Blackpool beat Halifax Town 3–2; and the third came on 27 January in a home league match against Oldham Athletic, which the teams drew 1–1.

In April 2005 Blackpool, under then-manager Colin Hendry, activated Coid's two-year contract extension option; however, Coid suffered a broken ankle eight months later, in a League One match against Tranmere Rovers on 11 December, and needed an operation. In October 2006, Coid was again out of action, when he suffered a knee injury that kept him out of action for three months.

On 27 February 2007, Coid returned to the Blackpool team after being out injured since 14 October 2006. On 27 May 2007, he was an unused substitute in Blackpool's League One play-off final victory over Yeovil Town at Wembley. Quashing rumours that he would leave the club in the summer, Coid signed a new one-year contract on 15 June 2007 with an option for another year. On 7 May 2008 Blackpool, Coid activated the option to extend his contract with the club by a further year. Coid said of the contract extension: "Just to be part of Blackpool still means a lot to me."

In the 2008–09 season Coid made eighteen League appearances as Blackpool spent a second season in the Championship, but was used mainly as a utility player covering for various positions in the team. After his contract expired at the end of the season, speculation arose that Coid might be released. However, he was offered a new contract, and on 19 June 2009 he signed a new two-year deal with an option for a further year.

"Everyone knows how much this place means to me. I'm not one of those lads who needs to go around kissing the badge – I've been at Blackpool since I was 14 years old and the club means everything to me, it's as simple as that."

— Coid on signing a new contract in June 2009

New Blackpool manager Ian Holloway said, "I am delighted he has signed again for us because I have played and managed against him and I know he is a good player. There's always a risk when you let players go out of contract and there is a change of manager, so it has been a little bit difficult. We've let a few players go but Danny was one I definitely wanted to keep. All the staff felt the same." He also confirmed that Coid would not be used as a utility player adding, "I have told him where he is going to be playing and that is on the right. He won't be playing at left-back and he is happy about that. The one thing that has been clear whenever I have spoken to him is that he cares for Blackpool and that he wants to be here, and that is good enough for me."

Coid was injured just before the start of the 2009–10 season, and by October 2009 had started light training with the hope that by the end of November he would be playing a full part in training sessions. His aim being to be playing again for the Seasiders by Christmas. Coid had suffered a fractured tibia and a strained hamstring. He finally made his return to action, and his first appearance of the season, on 3 February 2010 in the 2–3 home defeat to West Bromwich Albion, following an injury to regular right-back Neal Eardley and central defender Alex Baptiste falling ill prior to the game, meaning Coid was a late call-up to the squad and then the starting line-up. He played despite only a handful of training sessions since recovering from his injuries. However, he was forced out of the action at half-time after feeling his hamstring strain. He did not appear again for the club until 24 August 2010, when Blackpool – then of the Premier League – exited the League Cup at the hands of MK Dons.

On 2 February 2011, Coid was one of five players omitted from Blackpool's 25-man squad for the remainder of their debut season in the Premier League.

==== Rotherham United ====
On 12 November 2010, Coid left Blackpool for the first time, and joined Rotherham United on a one-month loan with the view to an extension if the club required. He played his first game for the Millers against Oxford United in a 2–1 win.

He is regarded as one of Blackpool F.C.'s longest-serving players.

=== Accrington Stanley ===
On 29 June 2011 it was announced he had joined League Two club Accrington Stanley on a one-year contract. In May 2012, Coid was released from Accrington after being told his contract would not be renewed. He scored once for Accrington in a 3–2 win over Aldershot.

=== Non-League ===
After a year out of the game due to injury, Coid joined non-League Kendal Town in August after training with the club. In the summer of 2015 he moved to Ashton Town to become player-assistant manager.

== Career statistics ==
As of 1 July 2012

Club performance			League		Cup		League Cup		Total	
Season	Club	League	Apps	Goals	Apps	Goals	Apps	Goals	Apps	Goals
England			League		FA Cup		League Cup		Total	
1999–2000	Blackpool	Second Division	21	1	2	0	-		24	1
2000–01	Blackpool	Third Division	46	2	2	0	4	0	56	2
2001–02	Blackpool	Second Division	27	3	4	0	1	0	38	3
2002–03	Blackpool	Second Division	36	1	3	0	1	0	42	1
2003–04	Blackpool	Second Division	35	3	2	1	2	0	43	6
2004–05	Blackpool	League One	35	0	4	0	1	0	42	1
2005–06	Blackpool	League One	13	0	-		1	0	16	0
2006–07	Blackpool	League One	18	0	-		1	0	19	0
2007–08	Blackpool	Championship	13	0	-		2	0	15	0
2008–09	Blackpool	Championship	18	0	1	0	1	0	20	0
2009–10	Blackpool	Championship	1	0	-				1	0
2010–11	Blackpool	Premier League					1	0	1	0
2010–11	Rotherham United	League Two	9	0	0	0	0	0	9	0
2011–12	Accrington Stanley	League Two	21	1	1	0	0	0	22	1
Career total			294	11	19	1	15	0	347	15

Notes

a. 3 league play-off appearances for Blackpool in 2001 (included in 2000–01 total)
b. All Football League Trophy results are included in totals

== Honours ==
Blackpool

- Football League Championship play-offs: 2010
- Football League One play-offs: 2007
- Football League Third Division play-offs: 2001
- Football League Trophy: 2001–02, 2003–04
