= Brett Ormerod =

English football player (born 1976)

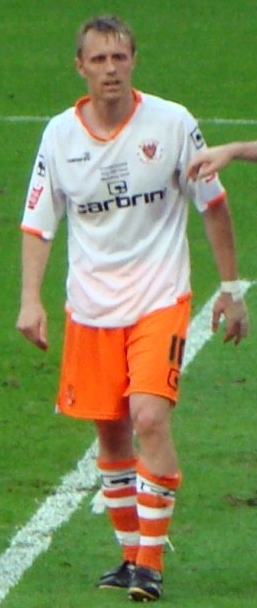
- Ormerod playing for Blackpool in May 2010

Personal information
- Full name: Brett Ryan Ormerod
- Date of birth: 18 October 1976 (age 50)
- Place of birth: Blackburn, England
- Height: 5 ft 10 in (1.78 m)
- Position: Forward

Team information
- Current team: Bolton Wanderers (Assistant Kit Man)

Youth career
- 199?–1995: Blackburn Rovers

Senior career*
Years	Team	Apps	(Gls)
1995–1997	Accrington Stanley	54	(32)
1997–2001	Blackpool	128	(46)
2001–2006	Southampton	98	(13)
2004	→ Leeds United (loan)	6	(0)
2005	→ Wigan Athletic (loan)	6	(2)
2006–2009	Preston North End	62	(13)
2008	→ Nottingham Forest (loan)	13	(2)
2008	→ Oldham Athletic (loan)	5	(0)
2009–2012	Blackpool	87	(15)
2012	→ Rochdale (loan)	5	(1)
2012–2014	Wrexham	74	(12)
2014–2015	Padiham	1	(0)
2015–2016	Bamber Bridge	25	(12)
Total		564	(148)
- * Club domestic league appearances and goals

Brett Ryan Ormerod (born 18 October 1976) is an English retired professional footballer.

A forward, he made 340 appearances in the Football League, including 215 for Blackpool, for whom he is the only player to have scored in all of the top four divisions of English football for the same club. In his 20-year-long playing career, Ormerod played for Accrington Stanley, Southampton, Leeds United, Wigan Athletic, Preston North End, Nottingham Forest, Oldham Athletic, Rochdale, Wrexham, Padiham and Bamber Bridge.

== Early and personal life ==
Ormerod went to school at Norden High School where he met Lisa Standring, who later became his wife. They married on her 24th birthday in June 2003 at the parish church in Rishton, Lancashire; their son was two years old at the time. As of 2015, his wife is a Subway franchisee. Ormerod worked at Hall and Letts textile factory in Great Harwood where he said he earned £130 a week.

== Club career ==
=== Accrington Stanley ===
Born in Blackburn, Lancashire, Ormerod was a youth team player at hometown club, Blackburn Rovers, but could not find his way into the first team that included Alan Shearer and Kevin Gallacher up front. He was released after their Premier League victory in 1995, having missed his final half-season of youth football following a double hernia operation. He then signed for Accrington Stanley, playing semi-professionally in the Northern Premier League while working in a cotton mill to supplement playing part-time in non-League football. He made 54 league appearances, scoring 32 goals.

=== Blackpool ===
Ormerod signed for Blackpool, who were then in Division Two, on 21 March 1997 for £50,000, making his debut as an 82nd-minute substitute on 29 March in a 0–0 draw with Chesterfield at Saltergate. His first league goal came the following season in a 1–1 draw with Carlisle United on 26 December 1997 at Brunton Park.

He became a regular first-team player in the 1998–99 season, when he made 40 league appearances and scored eight goals.

He spent four years with Blackpool, however he suffered a badly broken leg, breaking his tibia and fibula, in October 1999 that kept him out of the team in the 1999–2000 season when the club were relegated to the Third Division, something Ormerod would later describe as, "probably the lowest point of my career". He made his return the following season, and after signing a contract extension in January 2001, he helped the club to promotion through the play-offs. He scored the club's fourth goal in their 4–2 win over Leyton Orient in the play-off final at the Millennium Stadium, Cardiff on 26 May 2001.

Ormerod made a blistering start to the 2001–02 season, and he was linked with a move to Wigan Athletic in November 2001, who were reported to have bid £1.5m for him. They were one of four clubs to have made an approach for Ormerod, with Premier League club Southampton having had a £1m bid rejected. Blackpool chairman Karl Oyston said on the club's official website: "We don't have to sell Brett and we don't need to sell him. It's testament to the club's achievements and how the team are playing that other clubs are looking at players at this club." However, despite this, Ormerod was signed by Southampton for £1.75m on 7 December 2001. Southampton manager Gordon Strachan had been monitoring Ormerod while he was out of work, and vowed that when he was back in work he would immediately sign the player from Blackpool. He had made a total of 150 appearances for The Seasiders, scoring 62 goals in all competitions. 21 games 13 goals had come in the 2001–02 campaign.

=== Southampton ===
Ormerod made his debut for The Saints on 15 December 2001 as an 84th-minute substitute in a 2–0 home victory over Sunderland. After a number of substitute appearances, he finally made his full debut on 2 March 2002, when he also scored his first goal for the club, in a 3–1 win over Ipswich Town at Portman Road. He did not score again though until the following season, when he scored five goals in two games. On 2 October, he grabbed a hat-trick as The Saints beat Tranmere Rovers 6–1 in the second round of the 2002–03 Football League Cup. He followed that up three days later by scoring both goals as Southampton beat Manchester City 2–0 at St Mary's Stadium.

On 13 April 2003, after enduring a 24-game goalless drought Ormerod scored one goal and laid up another as Southampton beat Watford 2–1 in the semi-final of the 2002–03 FA Cup at Villa Park. Ormerod then appeared in the FA Cup final on 17 May at the Millennium Stadium, Cardiff, which Southampton lost 1–0 to a Robert Pires goal in the 37th minute.

Ormerod found first-team opportunities limited at Southampton and on 19 September 2004, in an attempt to secure some first-team football, he joined Leeds United on a one-month loan deal. Ormerod missed a penalty on his Leeds debut, making six appearances. On 18 March 2005 he joined Wigan Athletic on loan for one month with a view to a permanent move. The move was intended to last until the end of the season and he made six appearances, scoring two goals in their 2–0 win against Leicester City at the Walkers Stadium on 16 April, before being recalled by Southampton manager Harry Redknapp on 26 April following an injury to Peter Crouch.

After Southampton finished bottom of the Premier League in 2004–05 and were relegated to the Championship, he was able to play more often after the sale of several teammates who had been keeping him out of the team. Ormerod said of his time with the club, "I had some of the best years of my career at Southampton. It's a big club with great supporters. If I had my time again I would do exactly the same again, particularly as I got to play in a cup final."

=== Preston North End ===
On 27 January 2006, Ormerod was snapped up on a free transfer by Preston North End, the arch-rivals of his former club Blackpool. After signing a three-and-a-half-year contract, he said of the move, "It's a new start for me. Preston are a good team and I'm just really happy to be here." Four days later he scored just thirteen minutes into his debut as they beat Crystal Palace 2–0 at Deepdale.

On 8 May, he broke his leg, ten minutes into Preston's 0–2 play-off semi-final second leg defeat to Leeds United, following a tackle by Leeds' Jonathan Douglas. He made his return the following season as a 70th-minute substitute in a 4–1 home win over Sunderland on 14 October, and scored his first goal of the season in a 3–2 defeat to Burnley at Turf Moor on 27 October. He fractured his cheekbone fifteen minutes into the 0–1 home defeat to Wolverhampton Wanderers on 10 February 2007.

After making twenty league and cup appearances, scoring one goal in the 2007–08 season, Ormerod signed on loan for Nottingham Forest on 7 March 2008, until the end of the season. He scored two goals for Forest in thirteen appearances against Walsall and Northampton Town, with his decent form helping Forest gain promotion to the Championship.

On 15 October 2008 he joined League One club Oldham Athletic on a one-month loan deal, after falling out of favour at Preston and without making one appearance in the 2008–09 season. He made two starts and three substitute appearances for The Latics, but was forced to return to Preston earlier than scheduled after sustaining a broken toe in training in early November. His last game for Preston came in March 2008, he scored a total of thirteen goals in 62 league appearances.

=== Return to Blackpool ===
On 30 January 2009, after being released by Preston by mutual consent, Ormerod rejoined his first professional club, Blackpool, on a permanent deal until the end of the 2008–09 season. He made his debut for Blackpool the following day as a 90th-minute substitute in The Seasiders' single-goal victory over Crystal Palace at Selhurst Park.

Ormerod scored the first goal in Blackpool's 2–0 victory over Norwich City at Bloomfield Road on 7 March 2009. It was his 100th league goal and his first goal since returning to the club. On 25 April, Ormerod's goal in a 1–1 home draw with Nottingham Forest that secured The Seasiders another season in the Championship.

On 24 June 2009, Ormerod signed a new one-year contract, with an option for a further year, with Blackpool manager Ian Holloway saying, "I am delighted that Brett has signed again. He was a key player in the side that did well for the club towards the end of last season. He wants to be here, and is everything Blackpool stands for.'" He scored the winning goal in the 45th minute of the 2010 Football League Championship play-off final against Cardiff City on 22 May.

Ormerod became the first player to have played for the club in all four divisions, in Blackpool's Premier League debut on 14 August 2010, a 4–0 win over Wigan Athletic at the DW Stadium. On 22 February 2011, he became the first Blackpool player to score for the club in all four divisions, after scoring their third goal against Tottenham Hotspur at Bloomfield Road.

In June 2011, Ormerod signed a new one-year contract with Blackpool. On 3 January 2012, he joined League One outfit Rochdale on loan for 28 days, joining Blackpool teammate Daniel Bogdanović. At the end of the 2011–12 season his contract with The Seasiders expired.

=== Wrexham ===
On 2 July 2012, he signed a two-year deal with Wrexham of the Football Conference.

Ormerod made his Wrexham debut on the opening day of the 2012–13 season, playing 75 minutes of the 3–1 victory over Woking. Ormerod scored his first goal for the club in the FA Cup against Southport. His first league goal in the fifth division came in an away 5–1 win over Braintree Town in November 2012. His next goal came in a boxing day home match against AFC Telford United, a game which he scored a double. In March 2013 Ormerod played at Wembley for the third time in as many years in the FA Trophy final against Grimsby Town, the game ended 1–1 and Wrexham eventually won on penalties extending Ormerod's trophy collection. Ormerod left Wrexham by mutual consent in April 2014.

=== Later career and coaching career ===
After leaving Wrexham, Ormerod signed for Padiham in the Northern Premier League Division 1 North. In 2015, he joined Bamber Bridge, where he partnered another former Premier League striker in Jon Macken. On 21 January 2016, he confirmed his decision to retire, stating "At 39, it's time to hang up the boots, a big thanks to family and friends and everyone who has supported me, it's been a crazy ride thanks!".

In October 2019, Ormerod and John Hills became caretaker managers of AFC Fylde following the departure of Dave Challinor, leading them to a 6–1 victory over Peterborough Sports in the FA Cup and a 2–0 league win over Boreham Wood in the National League. On 19 December 2019, Ormerod returned to Bamber Bridge when he was added to Jamie Milligan's first team staff on a part-time basis.

In December 2024, he was appointed the assistant kit manager at Bolton Wanderers, reuniting with his former Blackpool teammates Ian Evatt, Stephen Crainey and Matt Gilks.

== Career statistics ==
Appearances and goals by club, season and competition
Club	Season	League			FA Cup		League Cup		Other		Total	
Club	Season	Division	Apps	Goals	Apps	Goals	Apps	Goals	Apps	Goals	Apps	Goals
Accrington Stanley	1995–96	Northern Premier League Premier Division										
Accrington Stanley	1996–97	Northern Premier League Premier Division										
Accrington Stanley	Total											
Blackpool	1996–97	Division Two	4	0	0	0	0	0	0	0	4	0
Blackpool	1997–98	Division Two	9	2	0	0	0	0	3 (Note: Appearance(s) in Football League Trophy)	0	12	2
Blackpool	1998–99	Division Two	40	8	1	1	2	0	0	0	43	9
Blackpool	1999–2000	Division Two	13	5	0	0	2	0	0	0	15	5
Blackpool	2000–01	Division Three	41	18	2	2	2	1	4 (Note: 1 app, 1 goal in Football League Trophy; 3 apps, 5 goals in Football League Third Division play-offs)	6	49	27
Blackpool	2001–02	Division Two	21	13	2	2	2	3	2	2	27	20
Blackpool	Total		128	46	5	7	8	5	9	8	150	63
Southampton	2001–02	Premier League	18	1	0	0	0	0	-		18	1
Southampton	2002–03	Premier League	31	5	7	1	1	3	-		39	9
Southampton	2003–04	Premier League	22	5	1	0	3	1	0	0	26	6
Southampton	2004–05	Premier League	9	0	1	0	2	1	-		12	1
Southampton	2005–06	Championship	19	1	1	0	1	1	-		21	2
Southampton	Total		99	12	10	1	7	6	0	0	116	19
Leeds United (loan)	2004–05	Championship	6	0	0	0	0	0	-		6	0
Wigan Athletic (loan)	2004–05	Championship	6	2	0	0	0	0	-		6	2
Preston North End	2005–06	Championship	15	4	0	0	0	0	2 (Note: Appearance(s) in Football League Championship play-offs)	0	17	4
Preston North End	2006–07	Championship	29	8	2	1	0	0	-		31	9
Preston North End	2007–08	Championship	19	1	1	0	1	0	-		21	1
Preston North End	2008–09	Championship	0	0	0	0	0	0	-		0	0
Preston North End	Total		63	13	3	1	1	0	2	0	69	14
Nottingham Forest (loan)	2007–08	League One	13	2	0	0	0	0	0	0	13	2
Oldham Athletic (loan)	2008–09	League One	5	0	0	0	0	0	0	0	5	0
Blackpool	2008–09	Championship	15	2	0	0	0	0	-		15	2
Blackpool	2009–10	Championship	36	11	1	1	2	0	3	1	42	14
Blackpool	2010–11	Premier League	19	1	1	0	1	1	-		21	2
Blackpool	2011–12	Championship	16	1	0	0	0	0	0	0	16	1
Blackpool	Total		86	15	2	1	3	1	3	1	94	19
Rochdale	2011–12	League One	5	1	0	0	0	0	0	0	5	1
Wrexham	2012–13	Conference National	39	7	0	0	-		3 (Note: Conference National play-offs) +? (Note: FA Trophy)	1 + ?	42 + ?	8 + ?
Wrexham	2013–14	Conference National	35	5	2	0	-		?	?	37 + ?	5 + ?
Wrexham	Total		74	12	2	0	-		3 + ?	1 + ?	79 + ?	13 + ?
Padiham	2014–15	Northern Premier League Division One North										
Bamber Bridge	2015–16	Northern Premier League Division One North										
Career total			450	98	22	10	19	12			491	120

== Honours ==
Southampton

- FA Cup runner-up: 2002–03

Blackpool

- Football League Championship play-offs: 2010
- Football League Third Division play-offs: 2001

Wrexham

- FA Trophy: 2012–13
