= 2009–10 Blackpool F.C. season =

English football club season

Blackpool F.C.
2009–10 season
- Owner: Owen Oyston
- Chairman: Karl Oyston
- Manager: Ian Holloway
- Stadium: Bloomfield Road
- Championship: 6th
- Play-offs: Winners (promoted)
- FA Cup: Third round
- League Cup: Third round
- Top goalscorer: League: Charlie Adam (17); All: Charlie Adam (19)
- Highest home attendance: 12,296 vs Bristol City, Championship, 2 May 2010
- Lowest home attendance: 6,855 vs Watford, Championship, 23 January 2010

The 2009–10 season was Blackpool F.C.'s 102nd season (99th consecutive) in the Football League. It was also their third consecutive season in The Championship, the second tier of English football. The club won promotion, via the play-offs, to the Premier League for the first time. Their victory over Cardiff City in the final was the club's ninth victory in their last eleven games. It was Ian Holloway's first season as manager.

Charlie Adam, in his first season with Blackpool, finished as the club's top scorer, with nineteen goals in all competitions.

== Season summary ==
Ian Holloway returned to his former club QPR for the opening game of the League season. Ben Burgess put the Tangerines ahead late into the first half, and that's how the score remained until Peter Ramage's 87th-minute leveller.

Three days later, Blackpool began their League Cup campaign at Crewe Alexandra. Adam Nowland, who had returned to the club on a non-contract basis the previous day, broke the deadlock on 52 minutes. Calvin Zola equalised for the Railwaymen in the 74th minute, before Daniel Nardiello, eleven minutes from time, scored what proved to be the winner.

On 15 August, Blackpool hosted Cardiff City at Bloomfield Road. Michael Chopra opened the scoring for the visitors, but Seasiders captain Ian Evatt equalised in first-half injury time. The match finished 1–1.

Derby County visited the seaside three days later, and they returned to the East Midlands with a point after a goalless draw.

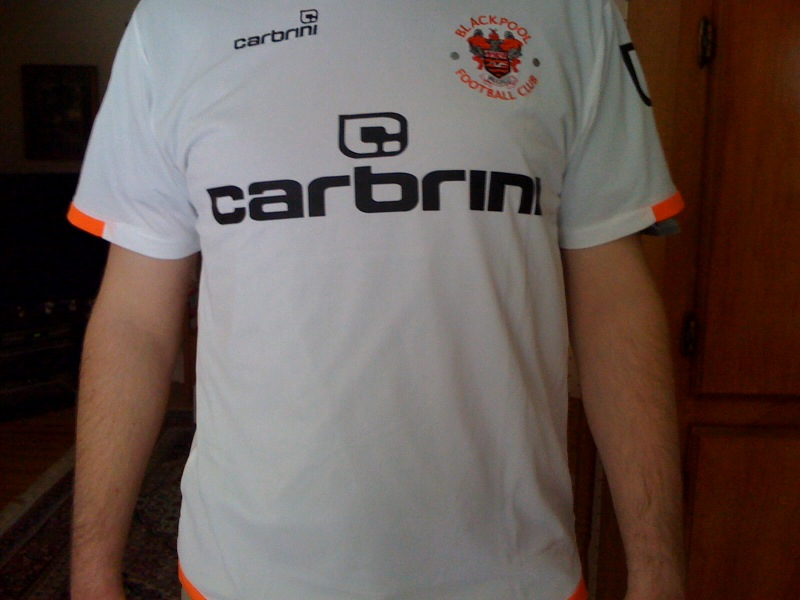
Blackpool's away shirt for the 2009–10 campaign.

On 22 August, Blackpool visited the Home Counties for a meeting with Watford. They came from behind twice to record their fourth-successive draw, Alex Baptiste and Gary Taylor-Fletcher the scorers.

In the second round of the League Cup, on 26 August, Blackpool hosted Premier League outfit Wigan Athletic. Ishmel Demontagnac scored his first goal for the club, followed by strikes by Ben Burgess (19 minutes), Charlie Adam (netting his first goal as a permanent Blackpool player), and Gary Taylor-Fletcher. The Latics pulled one back in injury time to make the final score 4–1.

Blackpool's first League victory occurred three days later, when Coventry City visited Bloomfield Road. The hosts won 3–0, extending their unbeaten start to the season to seven games.

The Tangerines suffered their first defeat of the campaign two weeks later, after an international break, at Leicester City. Matty Fryatt's double – one either side of Charlie Adam's strike just after the half-hour mark – gave the Foxes all three points.

Newcastle United travelled to Bloomfield Road on 17 September. The Magpies' Andy Carroll opened the scoring five minutes from the break, only for Brett Ormerod to level matters in first-half injury time. Jason Euell put Blackpool in front, with his first goal for the club, on 65 minutes, and it proved to be the final goal of the game.

Three days later, Ian Holloway's men visited the City Ground to face Nottingham Forest. Charlie Adam scored the only goal of the game, nineteen minutes in.

League Cup action resumed on 22 September, with a visit to Premier League side Stoke City. Blackpool were two goals up courtesy of David Vaughan and Billy Clarke, but the Potters fought back to level matters by the 79th minute. Tony Pulis' men took the lead for the first time on 80 minutes, before Ben Burgess equalised a minute later. Andy Griffin scored what proved to be the winner in injury time.

Back in the League, on 26 September the Tangerines welcomed Peterborough United to town. Jason Euell opened the scoring after three minutes. Eight minutes later, Hamer Bouazza opened his account for the club with the second, sealing 'Pool's third consecutive League victory.

Blackpool travelled to Bristol City three days later, and they suffered their second defeat of the campaign with a 0–2 scoreline.

Another, heavy defeat followed, at Crystal Palace on 3 October. 1–4 was the result at Selhurst Park.

After a fortnight's break, the Tangerines beat Plymouth Argyle 2–0 at Bloomfield Road, with Marcel Seip and David Vaughan finding the net.

Sheffield United visited the seaside on 20 October, and they returned to Yorkshire pointless after strikes from Marcel Seip, Jason Euell and Charlie Adam gave Blackpool a 3–0 victory. The result kept Blackpool in the play-off places and preserved their unbeaten home record.

The next game saw Blackpool earn a point away to Swansea in a 0–0 draw, a point that would ultimately determine the fate of both teams come the end of the season. Seven goals in the next two games saw Blackpool earn a 3–3 draw at Doncaster Rovers and a 4–1 home victory over Scunthorpe United. There then followed a slump with the Tangerines earning only one point from the next three games: a defeat away to Reading, a home draw with local rivals Preston North End, and then the first home defeat of the season, against Barnsley. A win (3–0 at Middlesbrough), a defeat at Ipswich, and a win at Derby County earned a further six points in the last three games of 2009.

January began with the club's only game in this season's FA Cup, a home defeat to Ipswich Town. The League resumed with two draws: 1–1 at Cardiff City and 2–2 at home to QPR, before a rescheduled visit from Sheffield Wednesday resulted in a second home defeat. A 3–2 home win against Watford and a draw at Coventry City was then followed by three straight defeats: against West Brom, Leicester City and Sheffield Wednesday. Then a visit to Deepdale could not separate the local rivals, with Preston and Blackpool playing out a goalless draw. Two 2–0 home victories (against Middlesbrough and Reading) followed. Then only four points were taken from the next five games, which saw the team lose games at Barnsley, West Brom and Sheffield United. A home victory was procured over Roy Keane's Ipswich Town after the Barnsley reversal, and a draw – also at home – against Crystal Palace rounded out the sequence.

A 5–1 victory over Swansea City on 23 March was followed four days later by a 2–0 victory in what was a long road trip to Ian Holloway's former employers, Plymouth Argyle.

Another victory ensued, this time 4–2 at Scunthorpe United. A fourth-consecutive win was achieved at home to Doncaster Rovers.

The run was ended on 10 April with a 4–1 defeat at eventual champions Newcastle United.

Blackpool completed a League double over Nottingham Forest on 17 April, with a 3–1 victory at Bloomfield Road.

Seven days later, the Seasiders made it six victories in seven games with a single-goal result at Peterborough United.

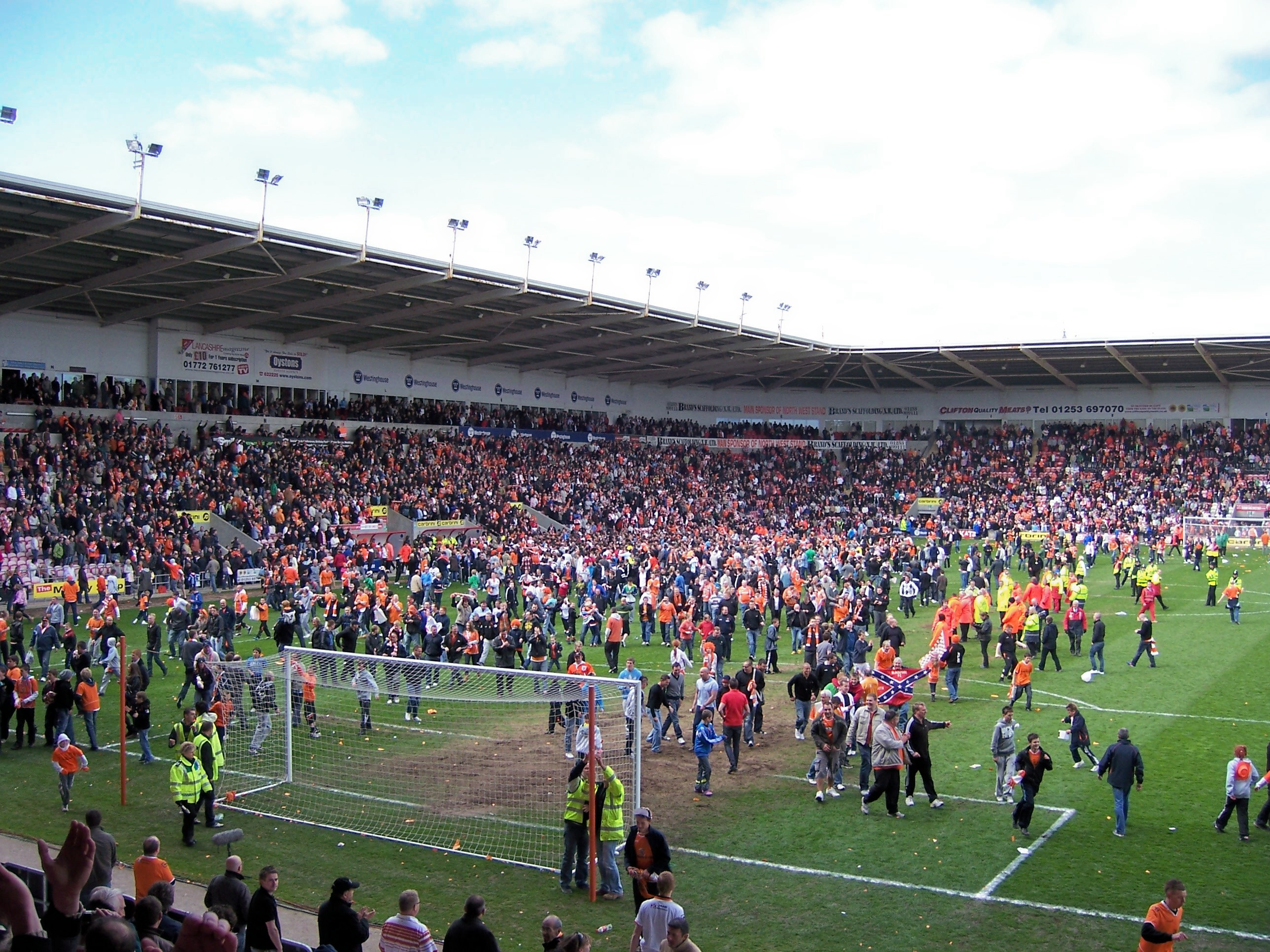
Pitch invasion as Blackpool make the playoffs against Bristol City

On 2 May, in the last game of the regular season, Blackpool faced Bristol City at home. Blackpool were on 69 points in the final play-off position, just one point ahead of Swansea City. Blackpool went behind in the sixteenth minute, but Brett Ormerod tied the game in the second half. The game ended 1–1. Swansea just needed to secure three points at home in their final game against Doncaster Rovers to take the final play-off place, but they were held to a goalless draw by the visitors and Blackpool made the play-offs.

In the first leg of the semi-finals, which took place on 8 May, Blackpool hosted Nottingham Forest at Bloomfield Road. The Seasiders won 2–1. Three days later, they met at the City Ground in the second leg. Forest took the lead after seven minutes, but Blackpool equalised eleven minutes into the second half. The hosts regained the lead on 66 minutes, but the visitors drew level again six minutes later. Blackpool went ahead for the first time four minutes later, and extended their lead on 79 minutes, with D. J. Campbell completing his first career hat-trick. Forest pulled one back in injury time, but Blackpool held on for a 4–3 win on the night and a 6–4 aggregate over the two legs and progressed to the final. Forest manager Billy Davies, who belittled Blackpool after the first leg, was sacked at the end of the following 2010–11 season after again failing at the play-offs stage.

The Final saw Blackpool face the victors of the other semi-final, Cardiff City, at Wembley on 22 May. The Bluebirds took the lead on nine minutes through Michael Chopra, but Charlie Adam levelled with a free-kick four minutes later. The Welsh side re-took the lead on 37 minutes, but once again their advantage lasted only four minutes, Gary Taylor-Fletcher heading in from a goal-line scramble. In first-half injury time, Brett Ormerod netted to give the Seasiders the lead for the first time, and that is how the score remained. Blackpool had won promotion to the Premier League for the first time.

The five players who were on loan to Blackpool at the end of the season – D. J. Campbell (from Leicester City), Andy Butler (Huddersfield Town), Barry Bannan (Aston Villa), Séamus Coleman (Everton) and Stephen Dobbie (Swansea City) — remained at the club until the conclusion of the civic reception that was held for the team in Blackpool on 24 May. On 26 May, Stephen McPhee, who had been out injured since January 2009, announced his retirement from the game at the age of 28. The same day, Blackpool announced that five players would not be offered new contracts when they expired. As such, they left the club on 1 July. The players in question were Al Bangura, Hamer Bouazza, Joe Martin, Danny Mitchley and Daniel Nardiello.

== Championship results ==
8 August 2009	Queens Park Rangers	1–1	Blackpool	London
15:00	Ramage 86'	(Report)	Burgess 37'	Stadium: Loftus Road; Attendance: 14,013; Referee: Andy D'Urso

15 August 2009	Blackpool	1–1	Cardiff City	Blackpool
15:00	Evatt 45+1'	(Report)	Chopra 12'	Stadium: Bloomfield Road; Attendance: 7,698; Referee: G Hegley

18 August 2009	Blackpool	0–0	Derby County	Blackpool
19:45		(Report)		Stadium: Bloomfield Road; Attendance: 8,056; Referee: Eddie Ilderton

22 August 2009	Watford	2–2	Blackpool	Watford
15:00	Smith 24'; Cleverley 63'	(Report)	Baptiste 56'; Taylor-Fletcher 72'	Stadium: Vicarage Road; Attendance: 12,745; Referee: Darren Deadman

29 August 2009	Blackpool	3–0	Coventry City	Blackpool
15:00	Adam 13' (pen.); Burgess 59'; Taylor-Fletcher 71'	(Report)		Stadium: Bloomfield Road; Attendance: 8,239; Referee: Nigel Miller

12 September 2009	Leicester City	2–1	Blackpool	Leicester
15:00 BST	Fryatt 26', 58'	(Report)	Adam 31'	Stadium: Walkers Stadium; Attendance: 22,827; Referee: J Singh

16 September 2009	Blackpool	2–1	Newcastle United	Blackpool
19:45 BST	Ormerod 45+2'; Euell 65'	(Report)	Carroll 40'	Stadium: Bloomfield Road; Attendance: 9,647; Referee: Jonathan Moss

19 September 2009	Nottingham Forest	0–1	Blackpool	Nottingham
15:00 BST		(Report)	Adam 19'	Stadium: City Ground; Attendance: 23,487; Referee: Penn

26 September 2009	Blackpool	2–0	Peterborough United	Blackpool
15:00 BST	Euell 3'; Bouazza 11'	(Report)		Stadium: Bloomfield Road; Attendance: 7,728; Referee: Bates

29 September 2009	Bristol City	2–0	Blackpool	Bristol
19:30 BST	Maynard 28'; Haynes 57'	(Report)		Stadium: Ashton Gate Stadium; Attendance: 13,673; Referee: East

3 October 2009	Crystal Palace	4–1	Blackpool	London
15:00 BST	Lee 4'; Danns 32'; Ambrose 62'; N'Diaye 89'	(Report)	Baptiste 53'	Stadium: Selhurst Park; Attendance: 15,749; Referee: Taylor

17 October 2009	Blackpool	2–0	Plymouth Argyle	Blackpool
15:00 BST	Seip 31'; Vaughan 64'	(Report)		Stadium: Bloomfield Road; Attendance: 7,765; Referee: Webb

20 October 2009	Blackpool	3–0	Sheffield United	Blackpool
19:30 BST	Seip 60'; Euell 69'; Adam 82'	(Report)		Stadium: Bloomfield Road; Attendance: 8,042; Referee: Mathieson

24 October 2009	Swansea City	0–0	Blackpool	Swansea
15:00 BST		(Report)		Stadium: Liberty Stadium; Attendance: 14,724; Referee: Hall

31 October 2009	Doncaster Rovers	3–3	Blackpool	Doncaster
15:00 BST	Woods 5'; Sharp 46', 90'	(Report)	Evatt 21'; Emmanuel-Thomas 62'; Burgess 77'	Stadium: Keepmoat Stadium; Attendance: 10,312; Referee: Oliver

7 November 2009	Blackpool	4–1	Scunthorpe United	Blackpool
15:00 BST	Evatt 59'; Adam 64'; Burgess 70'; Baptiste 89'	(Report)	Hayes 51'	Stadium: Bloomfield Road; Attendance: 7,727; Referee: Webster

21 November 2009	Reading	2–1	Blackpool	Reading
15:00 BST	Sidurgsson 52'; Rasiak 82'	(Report)	Ormerod 58'	Stadium: Madejski Stadium; Attendance: 15,945; Referee: Scott

30 November 2009	Blackpool	1–1	Preston North End	Blackpool
20:00 BST	Clarke 1'	(Report)	Wallace 38'	Stadium: Bloomfield Road; Attendance: 9,861; Referee: Friend

5 December 2009	Blackpool	1–2	Barnsley	Blackpool
15:00 BST	Adam 72' (pen.)	(Report)	Hassell 85'; Gray 88' (pen.)	Stadium: Bloomfield Road; Attendance: 8,108; Referee: Mason

8 December 2009	Middlesbrough	0–3	Blackpool	Middlesbrough
20:00 BST		(Report)	Taylor-Fletcher 21', 26'; Adam 83'	Stadium: Riverside Stadium; Attendance: 18,089; Referee: Shoebridge

12 December 2009	Ipswich Town	3–1	Blackpool	Ipswich
15:00 BST	Stead 1'; Colback 45'; McAuley 71'	(Report)	Evatt 67'	Stadium: Portman Road; Attendance: 19,831; Referee: Crossley

26 December 2009	Derby County	0–2	Blackpool	Derby
15:00		(Report)	Buxton 38' (o.g.); Ormerod 79'	Stadium: Pride Park Stadium; Attendance: 30,313; Referee: Mathieson

9 January 2010	Cardiff City	1–1	Blackpool	Cardiff
15:00	Hudson 9'	(Report)	Adam 46'	Stadium: Cardiff City Stadium; Attendance: 19,147; Referee: Ward

16 January 2010	Blackpool	2–2	Queens Park Rangers	Blackpool
15:00	Adam 9'; Taylor-Fletcher 77'	(Report)	Taarabt 55' (pen.); Connolly 84'	Stadium: Bloomfield Road; Attendance: 7,600; Referee: Kettle

19 January 2010	Blackpool	1–2	Sheffield Wednesday	Blackpool
19:30	Adam 90+6'	(Report)	Soares 71'; Clarke 84'	Stadium: Bloomfield Road; Attendance: 8,007; Referee: Hall

23 January 2010	Blackpool	3–2	Watford	Blackpool
15:00	Adam 17'; Southern 89'; Ormerod 90+1'	(Report)	Lansbury 27'; Cleverley 79'	Stadium: Bloomfield Road; Attendance: 6,855; Referee: Boyeson

30 January 2010	Coventry City	1–1	Blackpool	Coventry
15:00	Baptiste 83' (o.g.)	(Report)	Bannan 69'	Stadium: Ricoh Arena; Attendance: 16,019; Referee: Whitestone

3 February 2010	Blackpool	2–3	West Bromwich Albion	Blackpool
19:45	Southern 25'; Dobbie 80'	(Report)	Bednar 29', 40'; Dorrans 83' (pen.)	Stadium: Bloomfield Road; Attendance: 8,510; Referee: Foster

6 February 2010	Blackpool	1–2	Leicester City	Blackpool
15:00	Dobbie 89'	(Report)	N'Guessan 15'; Dyer 78'	Stadium: Bloomfield Road; Attendance: 8,484; Referee: Haines

9 February 2010	Sheffield Wednesday	2–0	Blackpool	Sheffield
19:30	O'Connor 3'; Potter 50'	(Report)		Stadium: Hillsborough Stadium; Attendance: 19,058; Referee: Eltrigham

13 February 2010	Preston North End	0–0	Blackpool	Preston
13:00		(Report)		Stadium: Deepdale; Attendance: 19,840; Referee: Jones

16 February 2010	Blackpool	2–0	Middlesbrough	Blackpool
19:30	Ormerod 30'; Campbell 90+4'	(Report)		Stadium: Bloomfield Road; Attendance: 7,936; Referee: Haywood

20 February 2010	Blackpool	2–0	Reading	Blackpool
15:00	Campbell 41'; Adam 74'	(Report)		Stadium: Bloomfield Road; Attendance: 7,147; Referee: Pawson

27 February 2010	Barnsley	1–0	Blackpool	Barnsley
15:00	Hume 75'	(Report)		Stadium: Oakwell; Attendance: 12,347; Referee: Singh

6 March 2010	Blackpool	1–0	Ipswich Town	Blackpool
15:00	Euell 54'	(Report)		Stadium: Bloomfield Road; Attendance: 8,635; Referee: Shoebridge

13 March 2010	West Bromwich Albion	3–2	Blackpool	West Bromwich
15:00	Miller 13'; Koren 53'; Dorrans 78' (pen.)	(Report)	Adam 6'; Ormerod 72'	Stadium: The Hawthorns; Attendance: 21,592; Referee: Moss

16 March 2010	Sheffield United	3–0	Blackpool	Sheffield
19:45	Cresswell 1', 66'; Montgomery 43'	(Report)		Stadium: Bramall Lane; Attendance: 22,555; Referee: Langford

20 March 2010	Blackpool	2–2	Crystal Palace	Blackpool
15:00	Adam 47'; Burgess 89'	(Report)	Carle 3'; Ambrose 34'	Stadium: Bloomfield Road; Attendance: 9,702; Referee: Gibbs

23 March 2010	Blackpool	5–1	Swansea City	Blackpool
19:45	Ormerod 13', 68'; Evatt 45+1'; Burgess 50'; Taylor-Fletcher 82'	(Report)	van der Gun 84'	Stadium: Bloomfield Road; Attendance: 9,149; Referee: Miller

27 March 2010	Plymouth Argyle	0–2	Blackpool	Plymouth
15:00		(Report)	Adam 78'; Dobbie 82'	Stadium: Home Park; Attendance: 10,614; Referee: Linington

2 April 2010	Scunthorpe United	2–4	Blackpool	Scunthorpe
15:00	McCann 48' (pen.); Hooper 86'	(Report)	Wright 22' (o.g.); Coleman 77'; Campbell 82', 85'	Stadium: Glanford Park; Attendance: 7,508; Referee: Woolmer

5 April 2010	Blackpool	2–0	Doncaster Rovers	Blackpool
15:00	Campbell 27'; Dobbie 67'	(Report)		Stadium: Bloomfield Road; Attendance: 9,701; Referee: Webb

10 April 2010	Newcastle United	4–1	Blackpool	Newcastle
15:00	Gutierrez 12'; Carroll 36'; Nolan 62'; Routledge 77'	(Report)	Ormerod 85'	Stadium: St James' Park; Attendance: 47,010; Referee: Russell

17 April 2010	Blackpool	3–1	Nottingham Forest	Blackpool
15:00	Adam 32' (pen.); Campbell 54', 84'	(Report)	Garner 65'	Stadium: Bloomfield Road; Attendance: 11,164; Referee: Taylor

24 April 2010	Peterborough United	0–1	Blackpool	Peterborough
15:00		(Report)	Campbell 11'	Stadium: London Road; Attendance: 7,812; Referee: Webb

2 May 2010	Blackpool	1–1	Bristol City	Blackpool
13:00	Ormerod 54'	(Report)	Maynard 16'	Stadium: Bloomfield Road; Attendance: 12,296; Referee: Mathieson

=== Final table ===
Pos	Team	Pld	W	D	L	GF	GA	GD	Pts	Promotion, qualification or relegation
4	Cardiff City	46	22	10	14	73	54	+19	76	Qualification for Championship play-offs
5	Leicester City	46	21	13	12	61	45	+16	76	Qualification for Championship play-offs
6	Blackpool (O, P)	46	19	13	14	74	58	+16	70	Qualification for Championship play-offs
7	Swansea City	46	17	18	11	40	37	+3	69	
8	Sheffield United	46	17	14	15	62	55	+7	65	

Source: The Football League
Rules for classification: 1) points; 2) goal difference; 3) number of goals scored.
(O) Play-off winners; (P) Promoted

==== Play-off results ====
8 May 2010 Semi-final, first leg	Blackpool	2–1	Nottingham Forest	Blackpool
12:45	Southern 26'; Adam 57' (pen.)	(Report)	Cohen 13'	Stadium: Bloomfield Road; Attendance: 11,805; Referee: Dowd

11 May 2010 Semi-final, second leg	Nottingham Forest	3–4 (4–6 agg.)	Blackpool	Nottingham
19:45	Earnshaw 7', 66'; Adebola 90+2'	(Report)	Campbell 56', 76', 79'; Dobbie 72'	Stadium: City Ground; Attendance: 28,358; Referee: Clattenburg

22 May 2010 Final	Blackpool	3–2	Cardiff City	London
15:00	Adam 13'; Taylor-Fletcher 41'; Ormerod 45+1'	(Report)	Chopra 9'; Ledley 37'	Stadium: Wembley Stadium; Attendance: 82,244; Referee: Marriner

== League Cup results ==
11 August 2009 First Round	Crewe Alexandra	1–2	Blackpool	Crewe
15:00	Zola 73'	(Report)	Nowland 52'; Nardiello 79'	Stadium: Alexandra Stadium; Attendance: 2,991; Referee: Phil Gibbs

26 August 2009 Second Round	Blackpool	4–1	Wigan Athletic	Blackpool
19:45	Demontagnac 3'; Burgess 19'; Adam 33'; Taylor-Fletcher 67'	(Report)	Amaya 90+4'	Stadium: Bloomfield Road; Attendance: 8,089; Referee: Michael Oliver

22 September 2009 Third Round	Stoke City	4–3	Blackpool	Stoke-on-Trent
19:30	Higginbotham 75'; Etherington 78'; Fuller 80'; Griffin 90'	(Report)	Vaughan 40'; Clarke 47'; Burgess 81'	Stadium: Britannia Stadium; Attendance: 13,957; Referee: Probert

== FA Cup results ==
2 January 2010 Third Round	Blackpool	1–2	Ipswich Town	Blackpool
15:00	Ormerod 51'	(Report)	Colback 3'; Garvan 77'	Stadium: Bloomfield Road; Attendance: 7,332; Referee: Ilderton

== Player statistics ==
=== Appearances ===
==== League ====
- Charlie Adam – 43
- Al Bangura – 9
- Barry Bannan – 20
- Alex Baptiste – 42
- Hamer Bouazza – 19
- Ben Burgess – 35
- DJ Campbell – 15
- Billy Clarke – 18
- Danny Coid – 1
- Séamus Coleman – 9
- Stephen Crainey – 41
- Ishmel Demontagnac – 8
- Stephen Dobbie – 16
- Neal Eardley – 24
- Ashley Eastham – 1
- Rob Edwards – 21
- Jay Emmanuel-Thomas – 11
- Jason Euell – 33
- Ian Evatt – 36
- Matthew Gilks – 26
- Stephen Husband – 3
- Joe Martin – 6
- Daniel Nardiello – 5
- Brett Ormerod – 36
- Paul Rachubka – 20
- Marcel Seip – 7
- Keith Southern – 45
- Gary Taylor-Fletcher – 32
- David Vaughan – 41

Players used: 29

===== Play-offs =====
- Matthew Gilks – 3
- Alex Baptiste – 3
- Stephen Crainey – 3
- Ian Evatt – 3
- Séamus Coleman – 3
- Keith Southern – 3
- Charlie Adam – 3
- David Vaughan – 3
- Gary Taylor-Fletcher – 3
- Ben Burgess – 3
- D. J. Campbell – 3
- Stephen Dobbie – 3
- Brett Ormerod – 3
- Barry Bannan – 2
- Rob Edwards – 1

Players used: 15

==== FA Cup ====
- Charlie Adam – 1
- Alex Baptiste – 1
- Stephen Crainey – 1
- Ishmel Demontagnac – 1
- Neal Eardley – 1
- Rob Edwards – 1
- Jason Euell – 1
- Ian Evatt – 1
- Joe Martin – 1
- Brett Ormerod – 1
- Paul Rachubka – 1
- Keith Southern – 1
- Gary Taylor-Fletcher – 1

Players used: 13

==== League Cup ====
- Charlie Adam – 2
- Louis Almond – 1
- Al Bangura – 2
- Alex Baptiste – 3
- Hamer Bouazza – 1
- Ben Burgess – 2
- Billy Clarke – 3
- Stephen Crainey – 1
- Ishmel Demontagnac – 2
- Neal Eardley – 2
- Ashley Eastham – 1
- Rob Edwards – 3
- Jay Emmanuel-Thomas – 1
- Jason Euell – 1
- Ian Evatt – 1
- Matthew Gilks – 3
- Mark Hudson – 1
- Joe Martin – 2
- Daniel Nardiello – 1
- Adam Nowland – 1
- Brett Ormerod – 2
- Keith Southern – 1
- Gary Taylor-Fletcher – 2
- David Vaughan – 1

Players used: 24

=== Goals ===
==== League ====
- Charlie Adam – 16
- Barry Bannan – 1
- Alex Baptiste – 3
- Hamer Bouazza – 1
- Ben Burgess – 6
- D. J. Campbell – 8
- Billy Clarke – 1
- Seamus Coleman – 1
- Stephen Dobbie – 4
- Jay Emmanuel-Thomas – 1
- Jason Euell – 4
- Ian Evatt – 4
- Brett Ormerod – 11
- Marcel Seip – 2
- Keith Southern – 2
- Gary Taylor-Fletcher – 6
- David Vaughan – 1

Total League goals scored: 72 (plus two own-goals)

===== Play-offs =====
- D. J. Campbell – 3
- Charlie Adam – 2
- Stephen Dobbie – 1
- Brett Ormerod – 1
- Keith Southern – 1
- Gary Taylor-Fletcher – 1

Total play-offs goals scored: 9

==== FA Cup ====
- Brett Ormerod – 1

Total FA Cup goals scored: 1

==== League Cup ====
- Charlie Adam – 1
- Ben Burgess – 2
- Billy Clarke – 1
- Ishmel Demontagnac – 1
- Daniel Nardiello – 1
- Adam Nowland – 1
- Gary Taylor-Fletcher – 1
- David Vaughan – 1

Total League Cup goals scored: 9
