= David Vaughan (footballer) =

Welsh footballer

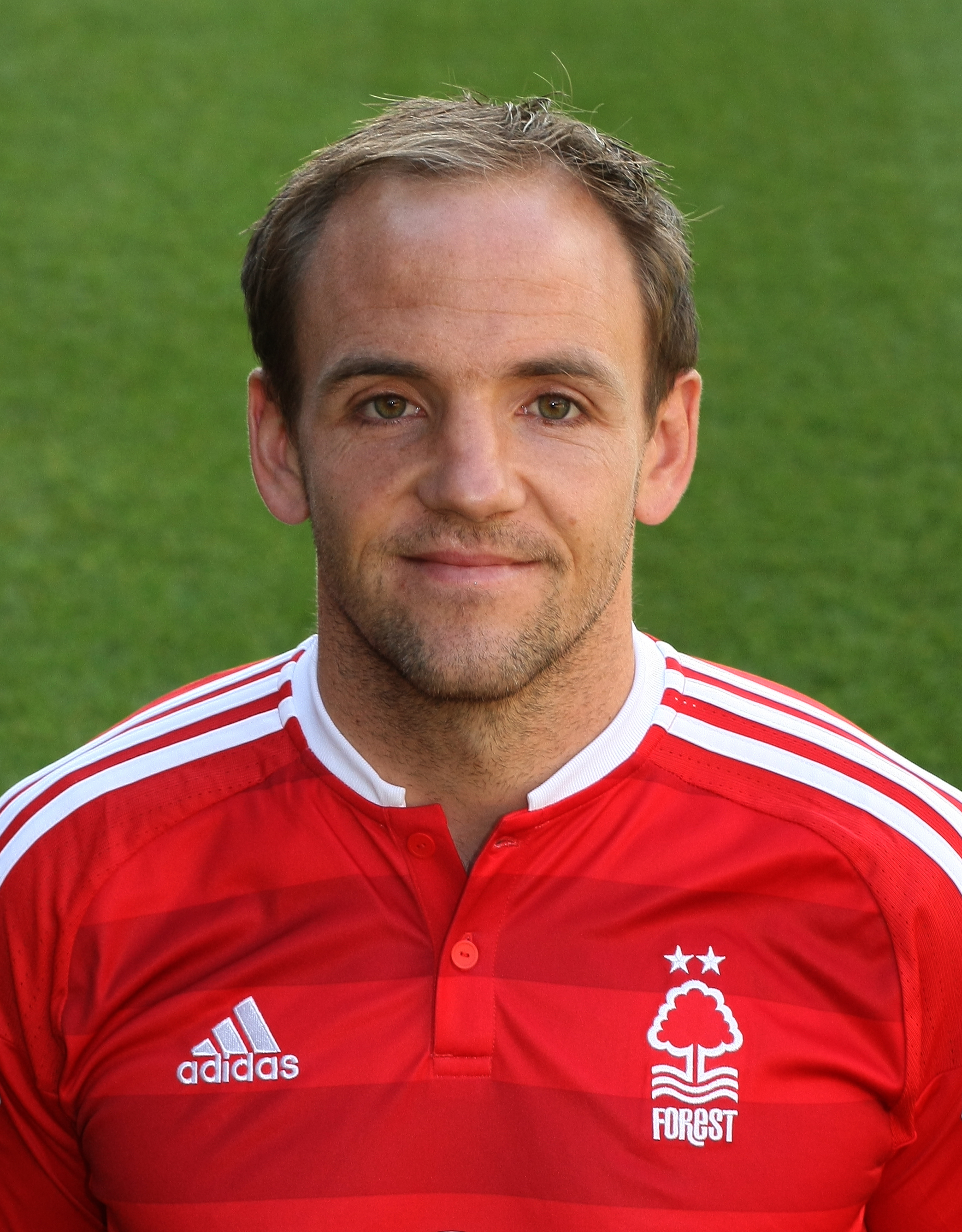
- Vaughan in Nottingham Forest kit, 2016

Personal information
- Full name: David Owen Vaughan
- Date of birth: 18 February 1983 (age 43)
- Place of birth: Abergele, Conwy, Wales
- Height: 5 ft 7 in (1.70 m)
- Position: Midfielder

Team information
- Current team: Crewe Alexandra U18s (manager)

Youth career
- 1997–2000: Crewe Alexandra

Senior career*
Years	Team	Apps	(Gls)
2000–2007	Crewe Alexandra	185	(18)
2007–2008	Real Sociedad	9	(1)
2008–2011	Blackpool	109	(4)
2011–2014	Sunderland	49	(3)
2013–2014	→ Nottingham Forest (loan)	9	(0)
2014–2018	Nottingham Forest	93	(1)
2018–2019	Notts County	22	(0)
2021–2022	Nantwich Town	11	(0)
Total		487	(27)

International career
2002	Wales U19	2	(1)
2002–2005	Wales U21	8	(3)
2003–2016	Wales	42	(1)

Managerial career
- 2023–: Crewe Alexandra U18s
Medal record
Men's football
Representing Wales
UEFA European Championship
Bronze medal – third place	2016 France
- * Club domestic league appearances and goals

David Owen Vaughan (born 18 February 1983) is a Welsh former footballer who is manager of Crewe Alexandra's under-18 team.

Vaughan previously played for Crewe Alexandra, where he spent seven years between 2000 and 2007. He then spent one season playing in Spain with Real Sociedad before returning to England to join Blackpool for three seasons. He then played for Sunderland, Nottingham Forest and Notts County.

He played internationally for Wales, having previously played for the Welsh under-19 and under-21 sides earlier in his career. In total, he earned 42 caps for the senior side, scoring once.

== Club playing career ==
=== Crewe Alexandra ===
Born in Abergele, Conwy, Vaughan began his career as a trainee at Crewe Alexandra. Initially an attacking full-back, manager Dario Gradi turned him into a left-sided midfielder. Vaughan made his debut on 19 August 2000 in a 0–0 draw with Blackburn Rovers. It was to be his only appearance in the 2000–01 season. The following season he made 16 appearances and scored his first goal for the club on 26 January 2002 in a 4–2 win over Rotherham United in the fourth round of the FA Cup. Crewe finished in 22nd place in Division One and so were relegated to Division Two.

The 2002–03 season saw Vaughan make 40 appearances, scoring four goals as Alex finished second in the Second Division, securing an immediate return to the First Division. He also scored the first goal in an 8–0 win over Doncaster Rovers in the Football League Trophy on 10 December 2002. Sixteen days later he scored his first league goal in a 4–0 win over Cheltenham Town at Whaddon Road.

The 2003–04 season saw Vaughan make 33 appearances as Crewe finished 18th in the First Division. The following season he made 48 appearances and scored six goals in what was now the Championship as Crewe avoided relegation on goal difference. In 2005–06 Crewe were relegated to League One, with Vaughan making a total of 36 appearances and scoring five goals.

Back in League One, Vaughan made a total of 35 appearances in 2006–07, scoring four goals. He played one game at the start of 2007–08; then, on 17 August, Crewe accepted a £300,000 bid for him from Spanish side Real Sociedad.

=== Real Sociedad ===
The transfer was completed on 23 August 2007, after Vaughan had held talks with Chris Coleman, who had been appointed as manager of Real Sociedad two months before following their relegation to the Segunda División from La Liga. Coleman resigned as manager on 16 January 2008 and Vaughan was to make only nine appearances, scoring one goal, as Real Sociedad finished fourth in the 2007–08 season, missing out on promotion to La Liga.

=== Blackpool ===
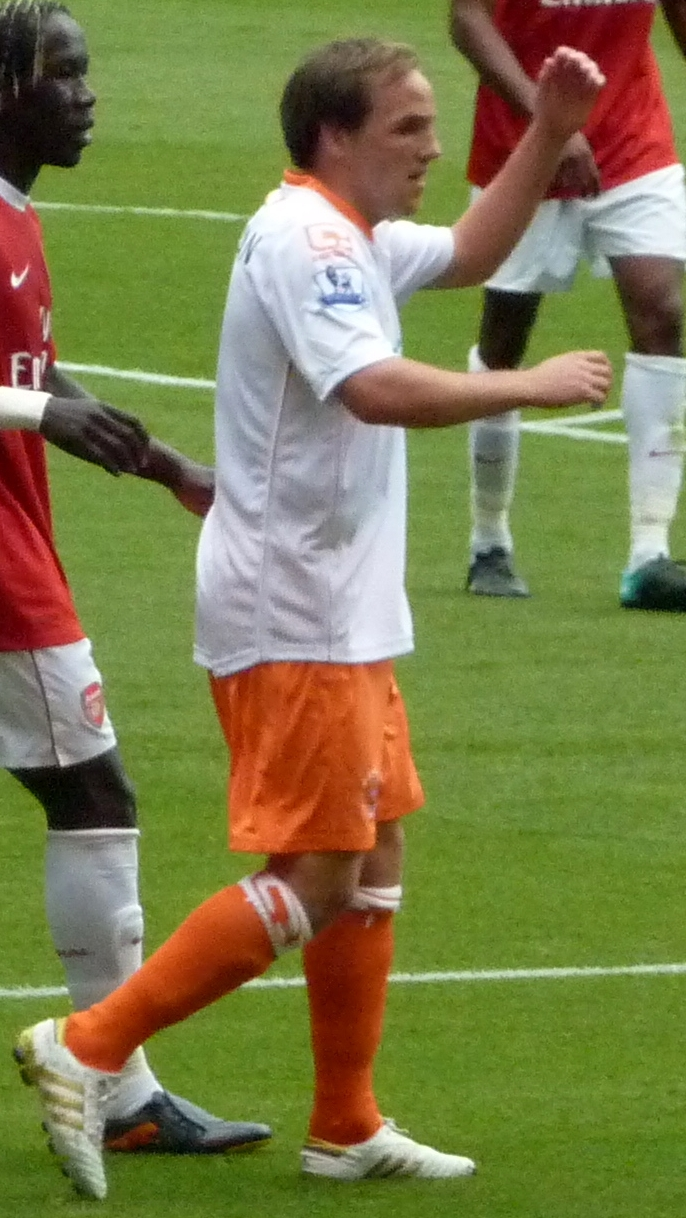
Vaughan playing for Blackpool during the 2010–11 Premier League season

On 4 August 2008, Vaughan moved back to England, joining Championship side Blackpool for a fee of £200,000. He signed a two-year contract, with the option of a further year.

He made his debut for the Seasiders on 9 August 2008 as a second-half substitute in a single-goal home defeat to Bristol City at Bloomfield Road. His first goal for the club came in a 2–3 home defeat to Doncaster Rovers on 7 February 2009. He made a total of 35 appearances that season.

His first goal of the 2009–10 season came in a 2–0 win over Plymouth Argyle at Bloomfield Road on 17 October 2009. Following his performance in the 2–0 home win over Reading on 20 January 2010, he was named in The Championship "Team of the Week". Blackpool reached the play-off final that season and were promoted to the Premier League for the first team. Vaughan started for Blackpool in the final, a 3–2 win against Cardiff City and was substituted in injury time.

In week eleven of the 2010–11 Premier League season, Vaughan was named in the Team of the Week, alongside teammate Neal Eardley.

On 26 February 2011, Vaughan captained Blackpool in Charlie Adam's absence. On 13 June 2011, it was announced that Vaughan had been unable to agree a new contract with Blackpool and would be leaving, citing that he wished to continue playing in the Premier League if possible.

=== Sunderland ===
Sunderland signed Vaughan on a three-year deal after agreeing personal terms and passing a medical. Vaughan made his debut on the opening day of the season, coming off the bench against Liverpool. After several games on the bench Vaughan replaced Lee Cattermole in central midfield at home to Stoke City, offering a man-of-the-match performance in Sunderland's first victory of the season, a 4–0 win. He scored his first goal for Sunderland against Blackburn with a 25-yard drive in the 84th minute on 11 December 2011 in a 2–1 win for Sunderland. On 4 January 2012 Vaughan lashed in his second goal for Sunderland as they thrashed Wigan 4–1 at the DW Stadium.

On 14 April 2013 in the Tyne-Wear derby against local rivals Newcastle United, Vaughan scored Sunderland's third goal to secure Paolo Di Canio's first win as a manager of the North East side with a strike from the 18-yard box in the 82nd minute. The game finished 3–0. Vaughan started Sunderland's final game of the season at Tottenham Hotspur, but was sent off after two late challenges as Sunderland then went on to lose to a last-minute Gareth Bale goal.

=== Nottingham Forest ===
On 31 October 2013, Vaughan joined Nottingham Forest on loan until 29 January 2014. Although injuries restricted his appearances for Forest to just six games, he rejoined the club on 31 January on loan until the end of the season. Shortly afterwards, he fractured his patella, and was expected to be out for some three months. On 20 April 2014 Nottingham Forest announced that Vaughan had agreed personal terms on a two-year contract, which would begin when his contract with Sunderland expired on 1 July 2014. Vaughan remained injured for the beginning of the 2014–15 season, before completing ninety minutes for Forest's under 21s on 26 August 2014 against Sheffield Wednesday's under 21s.

Vaughan appeared on the bench in a 5–3 victory for Forest over Fulham on 17 September 2014, although he did not make an appearance onto the pitch. Vaughan played his first game for Forest since signing permanently on 20 September 2014, starting in midfield against Millwall in a 0–0 draw at The Den. On 22 August 2015, Vaughan scored his first Nottingham Forest goal in a game against Bolton Wanderers in the Sky Bet Championship. On 12 January 2016 Vaughan received his first red card at Forest in controversial circumstances, for the use of a high foot whilst challenging Birmingham City's Clayton Donaldson for the ball. City manager Gary Rowett commented on the red card in his post-match comments:

"It was a little bit reckless, he stuck his foot up into Clayton's face, but I don't think it warranted a red card. If we had won the game on the back of that red card, I think it would have been slightly unjust."

Forest unsuccessfully appealed against the decision and Vaughan missed their next three league games against Bolton Wanderers, Middlesbrough, and Queens Park Rangers.

He was released by Forest at the end of the 2017–18 season.

=== Notts County ===
On 6 July 2018, Vaughan signed for Notts County.

He was released by Notts County at the end of the 2018–19 season.

in September 2021 he came out of retirement joining Nantwich Town. Vaughan left at the end of 2021–22 season.

== International career ==
Vaughan made two appearances for Wales under-19s in 2002, scoring one goal. Between 2002 and 2005 he made eight appearances for Wales under-21s, scoring three goals.

He made his Wales debut in a 2–0 away defeat by the United States on 26 May 2003, playing 90 minutes.

His first appearance in 2009 came in a 2010 FIFA World Cup qualifier on 10 October, a 1–2 defeat to Finland at the Helsinki Olympic Stadium. Vaughan set up Craig Bellamy to equalise for Wales in the 17th minute. Four days later he scored his first international goal by finishing off a Gareth Bale pass as Wales beat Liechtenstein 2–0 at the Rheinpark Stadion in Vaduz.

He was a part of Wales' successful UEFA Euro 2016 squad, in which they advanced to the semi-finals. However, he remained an unused substitute throughout the tournament in France. Vaughan retired from international football in July 2016.

== Coaching career ==
On 4 September 2020, Vaughan rejoined Crewe Alexandra as an academy coach, and in August 2022 became assistant manager of Crewe's under-18 team. A year later, he was promoted to be manager of the under-18s.

== Career statistics ==
=== Club ===
Club	Season	League			National Cup		League Cup		Other		Total	
Club	Season	Division	Apps	Goals	Apps	Goals	Apps	Goals	Apps	Goals	Apps	Goals
Crewe Alexandra	2000–01	Division One	1	0	0	0	0	0	—		1	0
Crewe Alexandra	2001–02	Division One	13	0	3	1	0	0	—		16	1
Crewe Alexandra	2002–03	Division Two	32	3	4	0	1	0	2 (Note: Appearances in Football League Trophy)	1	39	4
Crewe Alexandra	2003–04	Division One	31	0	0	0	2	0	—		33	0
Crewe Alexandra	2004–05	Championship	44	6	1	0	3	0	—		48	6
Crewe Alexandra	2005–06	Championship	34	5	1	0	1	0	—		36	5
Crewe Alexandra	2006–07	League One	29	4	0	0	3	0	3	0	35	4
Crewe Alexandra	2007–08	League One	1	0	—		0	0	—		1	0
Crewe Alexandra	Total		185	18	9	1	10	0	5	1	209	20
Real Sociedad	2007–08	Segunda División	9	1	0	0	—		—		9	1
Blackpool	2008–09	Championship	33	1	1	0	1	0	—		35	1
Blackpool	2009–10	Championship	41	1	1	0	1	1	3 (Note: Appearances in Football League play-offs)	0	46	2
Blackpool	2010–11	Premier League	35	2	0	0	0	0	—		35	2
Blackpool	Total		109	4	2	0	2	1	3	0	116	5
Sunderland	2011–12	Premier League	22	2	4	0	1	0	—		27	2
Sunderland	2012–13	Premier League	24	1	2	0	2	0	—		28	1
Sunderland	2013–14	Premier League	3	0	0	0	1	0	—		4	0
Sunderland	Total		49	3	6	0	4	0	0	0	59	3
Nottingham Forest (loan)	2013–14	Championship	5	0	1	0	0	0	—		6	0
Nottingham Forest (loan)	2013–14	Championship	4	0	0	0	0	0	—		4	0
Nottingham Forest	2014–15	Championship	13	0	1	0	1	0	—		15	0
Nottingham Forest	2015–16	Championship	35	1	1	0	1	0	—		37	1
Nottingham Forest	2016–17	Championship	31	0	0	0	2	1	—		33	1
Nottingham Forest	2017–18	Championship	14	0	2	0	0	0	—		16	0
Nottingham Forest	Total		102	1	5	0	4	1	—		111	2
Notts County	2018–19	League Two	22	0	1	0	0	0	2 (Note: Appearances in EFL Trophy)	0	25	0
Career total			476	27	22	1	20	2	10	1	529	31

=== International ===
Appearances and goals by national team and year
National team	Year	Apps	Goals
Wales	2003	1	0
Wales	2004	1	0
Wales	2005	4	0
Wales	2006	3	0
Wales	2007	4	0
Wales	2008	1	0
Wales	2009	2	1
Wales	2010	5	0
Wales	2011	7	0
Wales	2012	4	0
Wales	2013	5	0
Wales	2014	1	0
Wales	2015	2	0
Wales	2016	2	0
Total		42	1

Wales score listed first, score column indicates score after each Vaughan goal.

List of international goals scored by David Vaughan
Goal	Date	Venue	Opponent	Score	Result	Competition	Report
1.	14 October 2009	Rheinpark Stadion, Vaduz, Liechtenstein	Liechtenstein	1–0	2–0	2010 FIFA World Cup qualification	

== Honours ==
Crewe Alexandra

- Football League Second Division second-place promotion: 2002–03

Blackpool

- Football League Championship play-offs: 2010
