= Rob Edwards (footballer, born 1982) =

Welsh footballer and manager (born 1982)

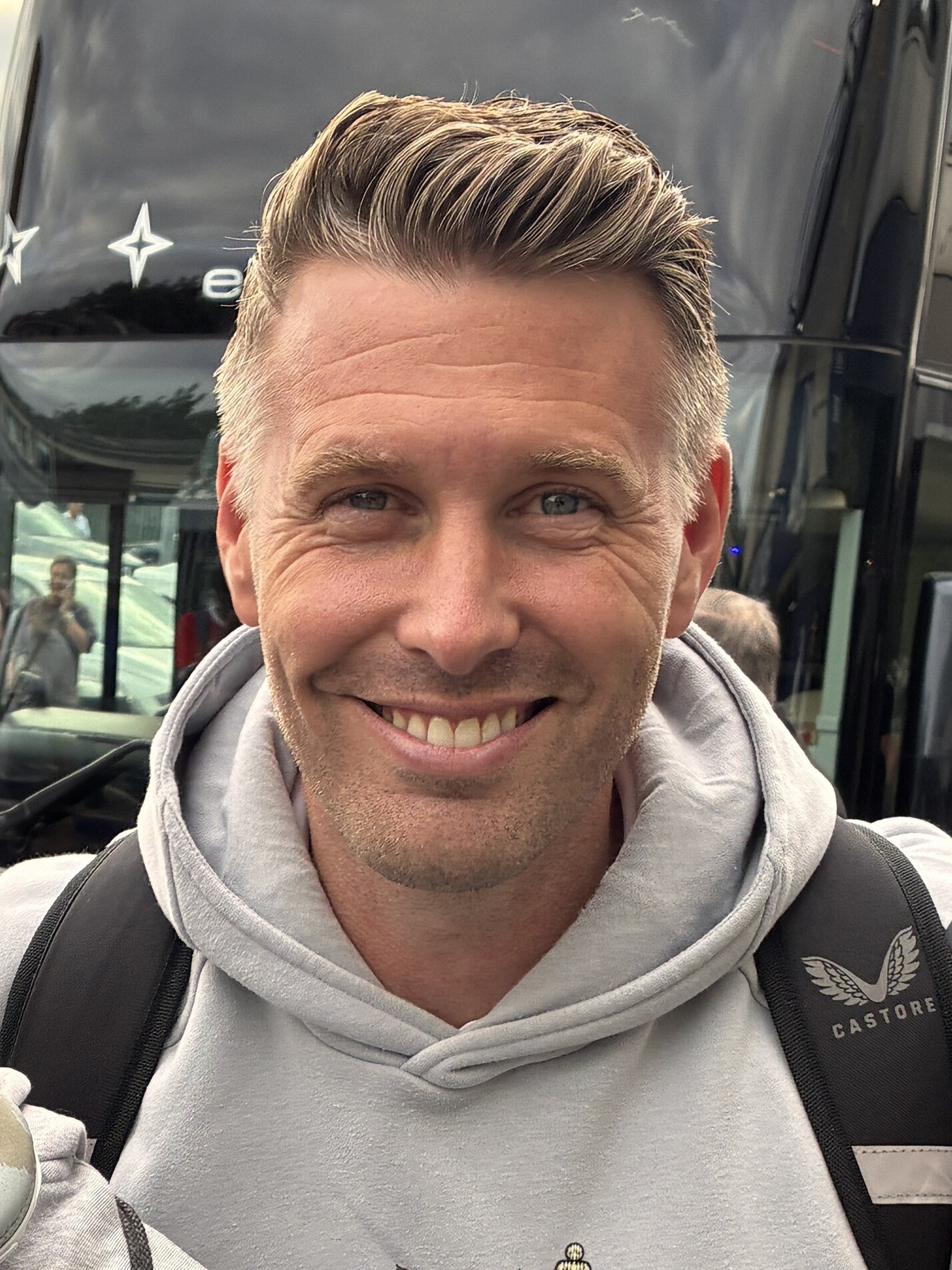
- Edwards in 2025

Personal information
- Full name: Robert Owen Edwards
- Date of birth: 25 December 1982 (age 43)
- Place of birth: Telford, England
- Height: 6 ft 1 in (1.85 m)
- Position: Centre-back

Youth career
- –1999: Aston Villa

Senior career*
Years	Team	Apps	(Gls)
1999–2004	Aston Villa	8	(0)
2003	→ Crystal Palace (loan)	7	(1)
2004	→ Derby County (loan)	11	(1)
2004–2008	Wolverhampton Wanderers	100	(1)
2008–2011	Blackpool	59	(2)
2011	→ Norwich City (loan)	3	(0)
2011–2013	Barnsley	17	(0)
2012	→ Fleetwood Town (loan)	4	(0)
2013	→ Shrewsbury Town (loan)	4	(0)
Total		213	(5)

International career
2003–2006	Wales	15	(0)

Managerial career
- 2016: Wolverhampton Wanderers (interim)
- 2017–2018: AFC Telford United
- 2020–2021: England U16
- 2021–2022: Forest Green Rovers
- 2022: Watford
- 2022–2025: Luton Town
- 2025: Middlesbrough
- 2025–2026: Wolverhampton Wanderers
- * Club domestic league appearances and goals

Robert Owen Edwards (born 25 December 1982) is a professional football manager and former player who was most recently the head coach of EFL Championship club Wolverhampton Wanderers. Born in England, he represented Wales internationally.

Edwards began his career with Aston Villa, making his senior debut in the Premier League. He then moved to Wolverhampton Wanderers in 2004, where he spent four seasons at Championship level. He helped both Blackpool and Norwich City to promotions to the Premier League and featured for Barnsley in the Championship before retiring due to injury in 2013. He played international football for Wales, making his debut in 2004 and winning 15 caps in total. He completed his coaching badges with the Football Association of Wales and moved into management after retiring as a player.

Edwards managed Wolves' academy and had an interim spell at the first team, before leading AFC Telford United and the England under-16 team. He guided Forest Green Rovers to promotion as League Two champions in the 2021–22 season. Watford appointed Edwards as manager in May 2022 but he was dismissed in September. He joined Luton Town later that year, leading the club to promotion to the Premier League via the playoffs. In January 2025 he left Luton by mutual agreement, and in June he was appointed head coach of Middlesbrough, but left later in the year to rejoin Wolves as manager. He was sacked from that role in June 2026.

== Club career ==
=== Aston Villa ===
Edwards was born in Telford, Shropshire. He started his career as an apprentice at Aston Villa, and worked his way up to his first-team debut on 28 December 2002, in a 1–0 home win over Middlesbrough. In January 2003, after playing in three consecutive matches at right-back he signed a new two-and-a-half-year contract with the club. Edwards went on to make nine appearances in total for Villa, all during 2002–03. He was sent on loan to First Division club Crystal Palace in November 2003, where he spent one month, playing six games and scoring one goal in a 1–1 draw with Coventry City.

Edwards then joined fellow First Division club Derby County on loan in January 2004, where he stayed until the end of the season. He played ten games for the club, scoring a goal in a 2–1 home win over Gillingham on 17 January.

=== Wolverhampton Wanderers ===
In May 2004, Edwards was told by Aston Villa manager David O'Leary that he could leave the club. Edwards made the short journey across the West Midlands and joined Championship side Wolverhampton Wanderers that July in a three-year deal for £150,000. After five games in August, he suffered an ankle injury and did not return until February 2005.

Edwards gained more playing time in the 2005–06 campaign and he played the majority of the following season under new manager Mick McCarthy but suffered knee ligament damage in April 2007. that kept him out of the season's end as the team made the play-offs.

He again suffered knee ligament injury, in a reserve team match against Walsall in September 2007. He scored his only goal for Wolves on 9 February 2008 in a 4–2 home defeat to Stoke City. He was placed on the transfer list in May.

=== Blackpool ===
In August 2008, Edwards left Wolves to join Blackpool, signing a two-year contract with an option for a further year for an undisclosed fee. He made his debut for the Seasiders on 9 August 2008 in a 1–0 home defeat to Bristol City. Edwards was captain of the side for the 1–1 draw at Norwich City on 16 August as Keith Southern who had captained the side up to then in the 2008–09 season, was suspended. Manager Simon Grayson appointed him as team captain for the rest of the season. His first goal for the Seasiders came on 29 December 2008 when he scored Blackpool's second equaliser in a 2–2 draw against his former club Wolverhampton Wanderers at Bloomfield Road.

Ian Holloway was appointed as Blackpool manager in June 2009, and gave Edwards 21 league appearances as the club went on to finish in 6th place, qualifying for the play-offs. After beating Nottingham Forest in the semi-finals, Blackpool won promotion to the Premier League by beating Cardiff City in the play-offs final, where Edwards was an unused substitute. Ahead of the 2010-11 season he agreed a new contract with Blackpool, a one-year deal with an option for a further 12 months, with playing in the Premier League being the reason behind him signing. Edwards signed for Championship team Norwich City on loan until the end of the season in February 2011. He made his debut as a second-half substitute for Zak Whitbread in the 1–1 draw against Preston North End on 5 March, and made two more appearances as the club won promotion to the Premier League.

=== Barnsley ===
Edwards was released by Blackpool at the end of the 2010-11 season and signed for Barnsley. He made his debut for the club in a 0–0 draw against Nottingham Forest on 21 February 2012. After not making a first team appearance in 2012-13, Edwards was loaned to League Two club Fleetwood Town in 2012. The following 31 January, he returned to his home county and joined League One team Shrewsbury Town on loan for a month. Days after the deal was expanded for the rest of the season, he was ruled out with a thigh muscle injury in training. He retired from playing in October 2013.

== International career ==
Edwards represented England at youth level, but not in a UEFA-recognised game, so qualified for Wales as his parents are both Welsh. He made his debut for Wales before he left Aston Villa, on 29 March 2003, in a 4–0 European Championship qualifying victory over Azerbaijan.

== Coaching and managerial career ==
=== Early years ===
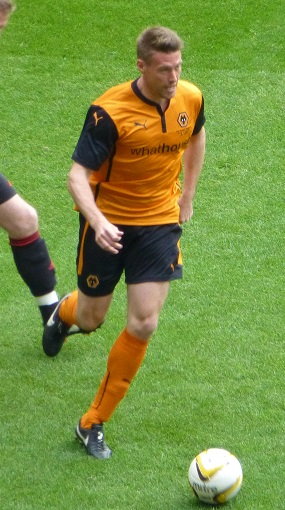
Edwards during Jody Craddock's testimonial match in 2014

On 11 October 2013, Edwards announced that he had retired from professional football at the age of 30. He did his coaching badges with the Football Association of Wales. He became Under-18s coach at Wolves, and his first season in charge (2014–15) was considered very successful by local newspaper Express & Star. He was promoted to help Head Coach Kenny Jackett for the final two months of the season, and then to the role of full-time First Team Coach during the summer of 2015.

On 25 October 2016 Edwards was appointed interim head coach at Wolves following the sacking of Walter Zenga. He took charge of two games – a 1–1 draw at Blackburn Rovers, followed by a 2–3 defeat to Derby – before Paul Lambert took charge. Edwards remained at the club in the role of first team coach until the conclusion of the season when he departed alongside Lambert.

On 28 June 2017, Edwards was named as the new manager of his hometown club AFC Telford United. The club finished in 14th place in the National League North, 10 points outside the play-offs. Edwards left by mutual consent at the end of the season.

Edwards was appointed as the head coach of Wolverhampton Wanderers U23 on 20 July 2018. In his first season in charge, he led them to promotion to Premier League 2 Division 1, the highest level of youth football, for the first time in their history.

In October 2019, Edwards left Wolves to take up a 'prestigious role' with The Football Association working as a coach with the England U20s. On 24 September 2020, he was appointed as head coach for the England under-16 team.

=== Forest Green Rovers ===
On 27 May 2021, Edwards was appointed Head Coach of League Two side Forest Green Rovers, joining the role on 4 June in order to be able to finish the season with his England sides. After picking up four wins from his first five matches, Edwards was awarded the EFL League Two Manager of the Month award for August 2021 with his star striker Matty Stevens winning the Player of the Month award. He won the award for a second time for November following three wins from three.

Edwards then won the manager of the month award for a third time for January 2022 after picking up 14 points from six matches, including a 4–0 win away at second-placed Tranmere Rovers, moving ten points clear at the top of the league. On 23 April, Forest Green drew 0–0 away at Bristol Rovers to secure promotion to League One for the first time in the club's history. The following day, Edwards was named the 2021–22 EFL League Two Manager of the Season at the league's annual awards ceremony. On 11 May, he departed the club following negotiations with Watford.

=== Watford ===
On 11 May 2022, Edwards was announced as the new head coach of Watford, taking over from Roy Hodgson at the conclusion of the 2021–22 season. His first game on 1 August was a 1–0 home win over Sheffield United with a goal by João Pedro.

On 26 September 2022, Edwards was dismissed as head coach after winning three out of ten league games and with Watford in 10th place. Slaven Bilic succeeded him on the same day.

=== Luton Town ===
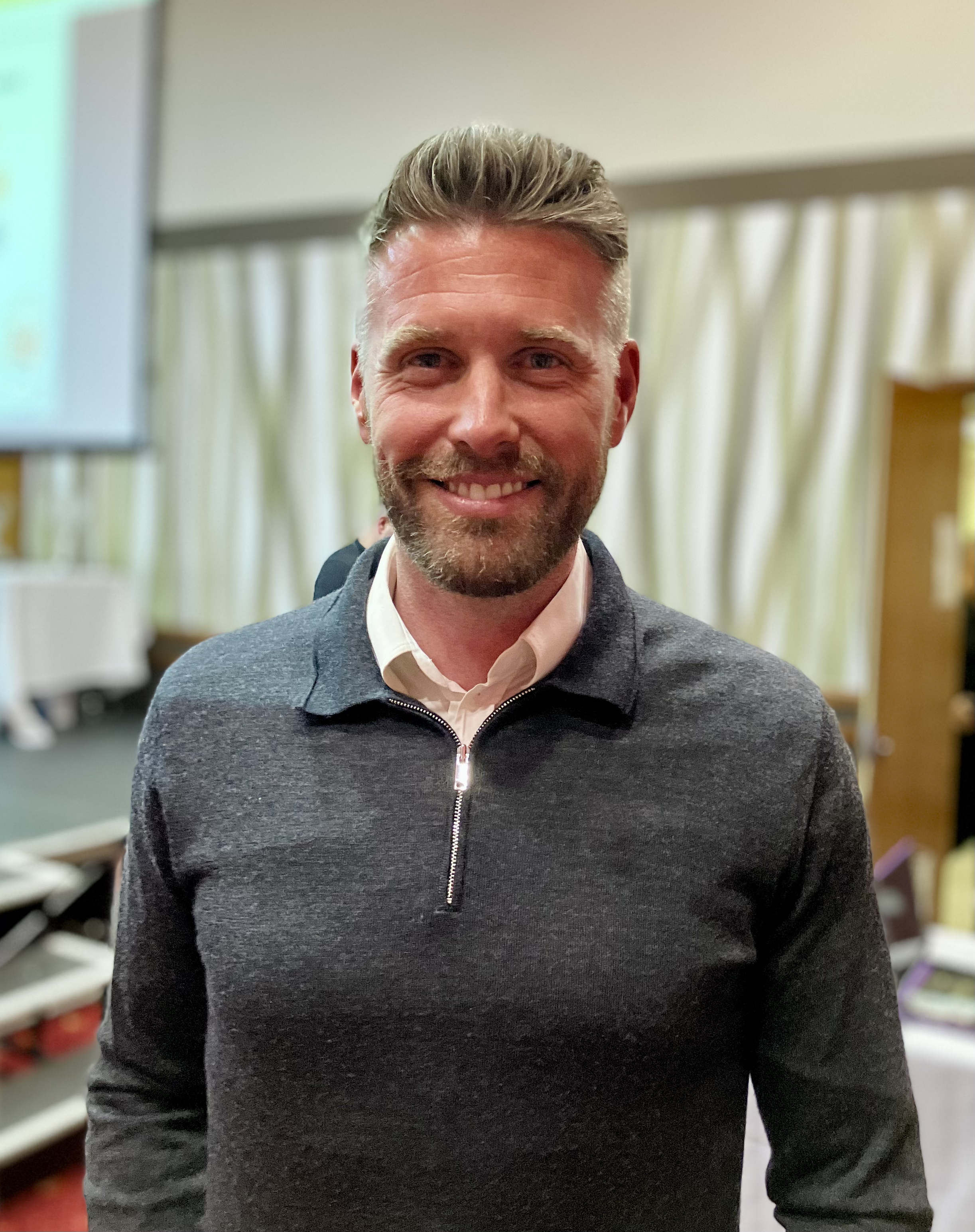
Edwards in 2023

On 17 November 2022, Edwards was appointed manager of Championship club Luton Town, rivals of Edwards' previous club Watford. In his first season at the club, he guided Luton to the Premier League, via the play-off final against Coventry City, through a third-place finish in the Championship, a two legged play-off semi-final win over Sunderland, and a win over Coventry in the EFL Championship playoff final, finishing extra time 1–1 and winning 6–5 on penalties. His team were relegated at the end of the season after a 4–2 home defeat to Fulham.

In January 2025, following a 2–1 away defeat to QPR and having only achieved seven wins in 26 games, Edwards left Luton Town by mutual agreement. The club sat in 20th place in the Championship, two points above the relegation zone.

=== Middlesbrough ===
On 24 June 2025, Edwards was appointed head coach of Championship club Middlesbrough on a three-year contract. Following a perfect start to the season, winning the first four fixtures of the 2025–26 season with just one goal conceded, he was named EFL Championship Manager of the Month for August.

In November 2025, Edwards was approached by Wolverhampton Wanderers over their head coach vacancy. Despite the club initially rejecting this approach, they granted Edwards permission to discuss with Wolves on 8 November, with Edwards not taking charge of the club's match that day against Birmingham City. He left Middlesbrough with the team sitting 2nd in the table.

=== Wolverhampton Wanderers ===
On 12 November 2025, Edwards was appointed manager of Wolverhampton Wanderers on a 3-year deal, returning to the club he began his coaching career at and replacing Vítor Pereira. Wolves paid Middlesbrough a reported compensation fee of around £3.8 million for him and his assistant Harry Watling. His first game in charge ended in a 2–0 home defeat to 2025 FA Cup Winners Crystal Palace. At the 20th attempt in their season, Wolves beat fellow strugglers West Ham United 3–0 which was their first win of their season. Edwards was sacked on 11 June 2026 after seven months in charge.

== Personal life ==
Edwards is the cousin of fellow coach Sean Parrish.

== Career statistics ==
=== Club ===
Appearances and goals by club, season and competition
Club	Season	League			FA Cup		League Cup		Other		Total	
Club	Season	Division	Apps	Goals	Apps	Goals	Apps	Goals	Apps	Goals	Apps	Goals
Aston Villa	2002–03	Premier League	8	0	1	0	0	0	0	0	9	0
Aston Villa	2003–04	Premier League	0	0	0	0	0	0	—		0	0
Aston Villa	Total		8	0	1	0	0	0	0	0	9	0
Crystal Palace (loan)	2003–04	First Division	7	1	0	0	0	0	—		7	1
Derby County (loan)	2003–04	First Division	11	1	0	0	0	0	—		11	1
Wolverhampton Wanderers	2004–05	Championship	17	0	0	0	1	0	—		18	0
Wolverhampton Wanderers	2005–06	Championship	42	0	1	0	2	0	—		45	0
Wolverhampton Wanderers	2006–07	Championship	33	0	2	0	1	0	0	0	36	0
Wolverhampton Wanderers	2007–08	Championship	8	1	2	0	2	0	—		12	1
Wolverhampton Wanderers	Total		100	1	5	0	6	0	0	0	111	1
Blackpool	2008–09	Championship	36	2	0	0	1	0	—		37	2
Blackpool	2009–10	Championship	21	0	1	0	3	0	1 (Note: Appearance in Championship play-offs)	0	26	0
Blackpool	2010–11	Premier League	2	0	1	0	1	0	—		4	0
Blackpool	Total		59	2	2	0	5	0	1	0	67	2
Norwich City (loan)	2010–11	Championship	3	0	—		—		—		3	0
Barnsley	2011–12	Championship	17	0	0	0	1	0	—		18	0
Barnsley	2012–13	Championship	0	0	0	0	0	0	—		0	0
Barnsley	Total		17	0	0	0	1	0	—		18	0
Fleetwood Town (loan)	2012–13	League Two	4	0	1	0	—		—		5	0
Shrewsbury Town (loan)	2012–13	League One	4	0	—		—		—		4	0
Career total			213	5	9	0	12	0	1	0	235	5

== Managerial statistics ==
As of match played 24 May 2026

Managerial record by team and tenure
Team	From	To	Record					Ref.
Team	From	To	P	W	D	L	Win %	Ref.
Wolverhampton Wanderers (interim)	25 October 2016	5 November 2016	2	0	1	1	0.0	
AFC Telford United	30 June 2017	4 May 2018	49	20	6	23	40.8	
England U16	24 September 2020	5 June 2021	2	1	0	1	50.0	
Forest Green Rovers	5 June 2021	11 May 2022	53	24	19	10	45.3	
Watford	23 May 2022	26 September 2022	11	3	5	3	27.3	
Luton Town	17 November 2022	9 January 2025	103	32	25	46	31.1	
Middlesbrough	24 June 2025	12 November 2025	15	7	5	3	46.7	
Wolverhampton Wanderers	12 November 2025	11 June 2026	30	5	9	16	16.7	
Total			265	92	70	103	34.7	

== Honours ==
=== As a player ===
Blackpool

- Football League Championship play-offs: 2010

=== As a manager ===
Forest Green Rovers

- EFL League Two: 2021–22

Luton Town

- EFL Championship play-offs: 2023

Individual

- EFL Championship Manager of the Month: August 2025
- EFL League Two Manager of the Month: August 2021, November 2021, January 2022
- EFL League Two Manager of the Season: 2021–22
