= 2001–02 Blackpool F.C. season =

English football club season

Blackpool F.C.
2001–02 season
- Owner: Owen Oyston
- Chairman: Karl Oyston
- Manager: Steve McMahon
- Division Two: 16th
- FA Cup: Third round
- League Cup: Second round
- Top goalscorer: League: John Murphy & Brett Ormerod (13 each); All: John Murphy & Brett Ormerod (20 each)
- Highest home attendance: 9,333 v Bristol City; 13 April 2002
- Lowest home attendance: 3,561 v Stoke City; 16 October 2001

The 2001–02 season was Blackpool F.C.'s 94th season (91st consecutive) in the Football League. They competed in the 24-team Division Two, then the third tier of English league football, finishing sixteenth.

John Murphy and Brett Ormerod were the club's joint-top scorers, with twenty goals each in all competitions. Ormerod achieved this feat despite being sold to Southampton for a Blackpool club-record £1.75million in November.

== Table ==
Pos	Team	Pld	W	D	L	GF	GA	GD	Pts
14	Port Vale	46	16	10	20	51	62	−11	58
15	Colchester United	46	15	12	19	65	76	−11	57
16	Blackpool	46	14	14	18	66	69	−3	56
17	Peterborough United	46	15	10	21	64	59	+5	55
18	Chesterfield	46	13	13	20	53	65	−12	52

Rules for classification: In the Football League goals scored (GF) takes precedence over goal difference (GD).
