= 2010 Football League Championship play-off final =

Association football match in London

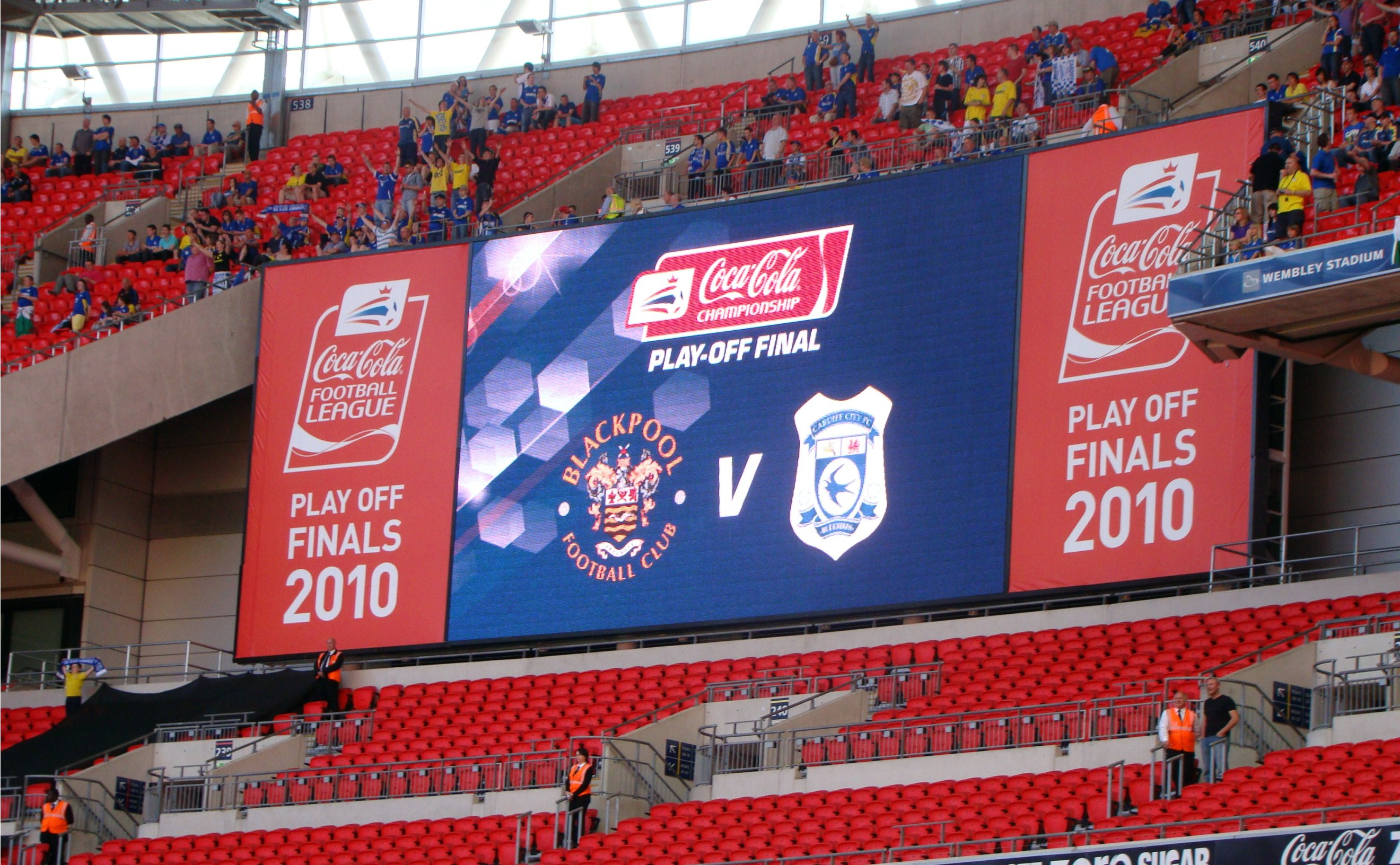
- Event: 2009–10 Football League Championship
Blackpool	Cardiff City
3	2
- Date: 22 May 2010
- Venue: Wembley Stadium, London
- Man of the Match: Keith Southern (Blackpool)
- Referee: Andre Marriner (Birmingham)
- Attendance: 82,244
- Weather: Sunny, 28 °C (82 °F)

The 2010 Football League Championship play-off final was an association football match played at Wembley Stadium, London, on 22 May 2010 between Blackpool and Cardiff City. The match was to determine the third and final team to win promotion from the Championship, the second tier of English football, to the Premier League for the 2010–11 season. The culmination of the 2010 Football League Championship play-offs, the match saw Blackpool beat Cardiff City to earn promotion alongside the division champions Newcastle United and runners-up West Bromwich Albion. The match, and subsequent promotion, were estimated to be worth around £90 million to the winning team.

Blackpool entered the play-offs having finished sixth in the 2009–10 Football League Championship, securing the last of the play-off places on the final day of the regular season, while Cardiff finished two places above them in fourth. Blackpool reached the play-off final with a 6–4 aggregate semi-final victory over third-place finishers Nottingham Forest. In their semi-final, Cardiff beat fifth-placed Leicester City under a penalty shoot-out following a 3–3 aggregate draw over two legs.

The play-off final was played in front of 82,244 spectators and was refereed by Andre Marriner. In the game, Cardiff twice took the lead through goals by Michael Chopra and Joe Ledley. On both occasions, Blackpool equalised within four minutes, first through Charlie Adam and later Gary Taylor-Fletcher. Blackpool took the lead shortly before half-time following a goal from striker Brett Ormerod. With no score from either team in the second half, the final result was a 3–2 victory for Blackpool.

As a consequence of winning promotion, Blackpool's Bloomfield Road stadium, which had a capacity of 16,750, became one of the smallest stadiums to host Premier League football. It also meant Blackpool returned to the top flight of English League football for the first time since the 1970–71 season, when they spent one season in the old First Division, finishing bottom. In the season following their 2010 play-off final victory, they were relegated back to the Championship. Cardiff reached the play-offs again the following season but were defeated in the semi-finals.

== Route to the final ==
Football League Championship final table, leading positions
Pos	Team	Pld	W	D	L	GF	GA	GD	Pts
1	Newcastle United	46	30	12	4	90	35	+55	102
2	West Bromwich Albion	46	26	13	7	89	48	+41	91
3	Nottingham Forest	46	22	13	11	65	40	+25	79
4	Cardiff City	46	22	10	14	73	54	+19	76
5	Leicester City	46	21	13	12	61	45	+16	76
6	Blackpool	46	19	13	14	74	58	+16	70

The 2009–10 Championship title was won by Newcastle United with 102 points, returning to the Premier League one season after being relegated. The second automatic promotion spot was claimed by West Bromwich Albion who had also been relegated from the Premier League the previous year.

Blackpool, who had been considered candidates for relegation at the start of the season by some critics, finished the campaign in sixth position to claim the final play-off place. They secured the spot with a 1–1 draw against Bristol City in their final league match. With a total of 70 points, they finished a single point ahead of Swansea City who were held to a 0–0 draw with Doncaster Rovers in their final match. Blackpool's opponents for the play-off semi-finals were third-placed Nottingham Forest, against whom they won the first leg 2–1 at Bloomfield Road. Having conceded a 13th-minute goal from Chris Cohen, Blackpool came from behind to win following a goal from Keith Southern and a penalty from Charlie Adam.

In the second leg, Blackpool twice fell behind, equalising first through DJ Campbell, after an early first-half goal from Robert Earnshaw, and again from Stephen Dobbie after Earnshaw's second goal of the match. They took the lead with two quick goals from Campbell who completed his hat-trick in the space of three minutes, scoring in the 76th and 79th minutes, as Blackpool took a 6–3 aggregate lead. Forest striker Dele Adebola scored a late consolation goal in injury time but Blackpool advanced to the play-off final as the match finished 4–3, with an aggregate score of 6–4.

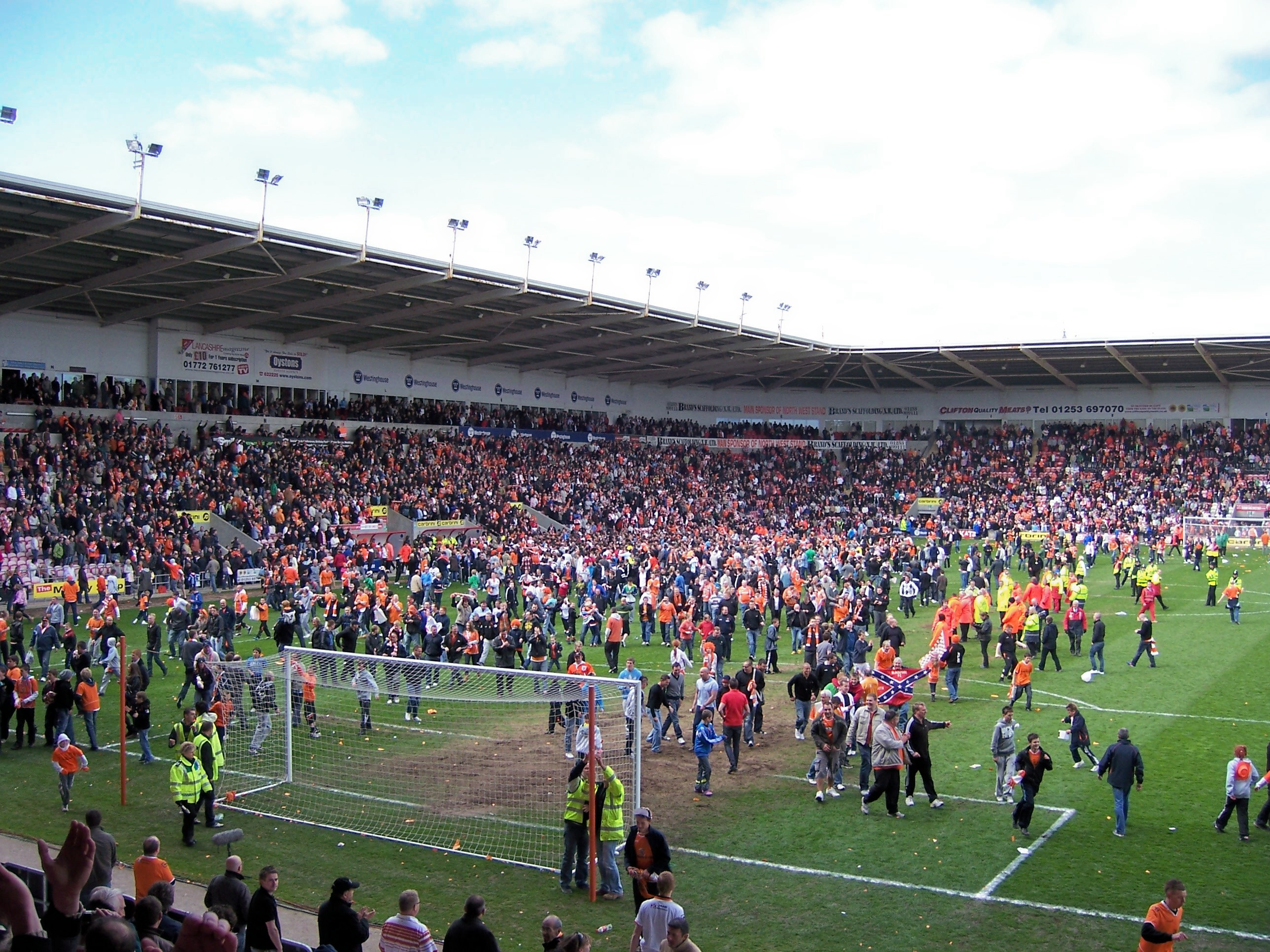
Blackpool fans celebrate at Bloomfield Road after their final league match of the campaign having reached the play-offs

Cardiff City finished fourth in the Championship, three points behind Nottingham Forest and level on points with Leicester City in fifth, to reach the Championship play-offs for the first time. The first leg at the Walkers Stadium was decided by a single goal from Cardiff's Peter Whittingham, who scored from a free kick in the 78th minute. Despite intense pressure in the final 10 minutes, Cardiff held out to claim victory.

In the second leg, Michael Chopra opened the scoring to double Cardiff's aggregate lead, but an equaliser on the day from Matty Fryatt and an own goal from Cardiff captain Mark Hudson made it level on aggregate at 2–2. Andy King then gave Leicester the lead on aggregate with a goal just after half-time. With just over 20 minutes to play, Cardiff were awarded a penalty, which Whittingham scored to level the aggregate score again at 3–3. With the away goals rule not in effect in the Football League play-offs, the match went to extra time. No further goals were scored in the additional 30 minutes, so the match had to be settled by a penalty shoot-out. Both sides scored each of their first three kicks, before David Marshall saved a Panenka attempt from Leicester's Yann Kermorgant, allowing Mark Kennedy to give Cardiff the lead. Marshall then saved Martyn Waghorn's spot-kick to put Cardiff through to the final.

Blackpool				Cardiff City
Opponent	Result	Legs	Round	Opponent	Result	Legs
Nottingham Forest	6–4	2–1 home; 4–3 away	Semi-finals	Leicester City	3–3 (4–3 on pens)	1–0 away; 2–3 home

== Match ==
=== Background ===
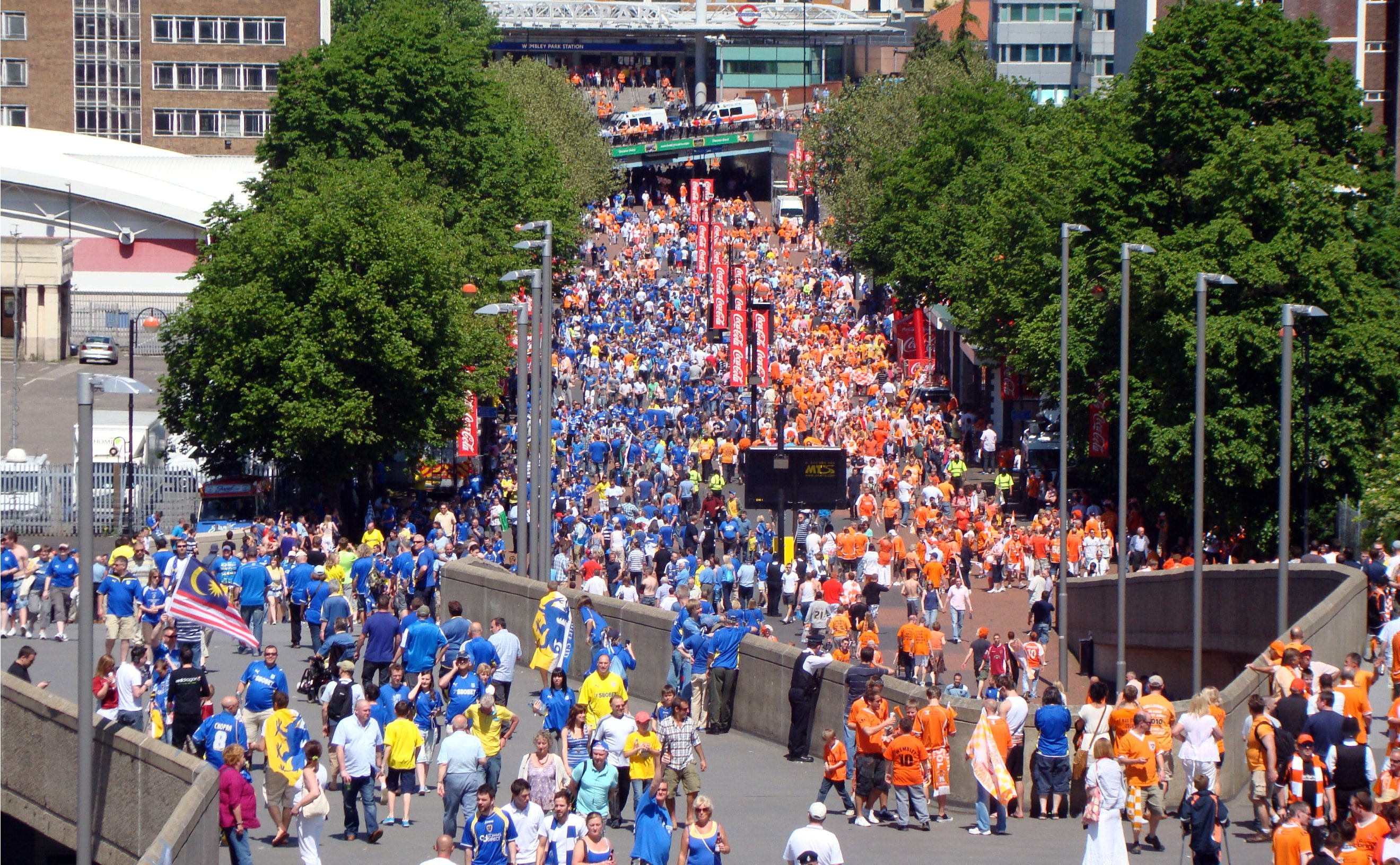
Cardiff City fans (blue) and Blackpool fans (tangerine) make their way to the stadium along Wembley Way

Ian Holloway had been appointed manager of Blackpool at the end of the 2008–09 season on a one-year contract, following a year without a role in football. During the summer transfer window, he made numerous signings, the most prominent of which was the permanent signing of Charlie Adam for around £500,000. Adam had impressed during a loan the spell the previous year and continued his form by finishing the 2009–10 campaign as the club's highest goalscorer with 16 league goals. Blackpool president Valērijs Belokoņs had promised the club's players a £5 million reward fund at the start of the 2009–10 season if they achieved promotion to the Premier League, to be shared among the players dependent on appearances made over the course of the season. Club captain Ian Evatt stated that the potential bonus had spurred the team on during the season, commenting that "if anyone deserves it, it is this group of players".

Cardiff had narrowly failed to gain a play-off place the previous year, losing the final place to Preston North End on the last day of the season after failing to win any of their last four matches. Defender Roger Johnson was sold to Birmingham City for £5 million, but the money was reinvested into the side with the arrivals of Chopra, Hudson, Marshall, Anthony Gerrard and Paul Quinn. The signing of Chopra for a reported £4 million more than doubled the club's previous transfer record, surpassing the £1.75 m paid for Peter Thorne in 2001. Chopra proved prolific during the campaign, scoring 21 times in all competitions. He was the club's second highest goalscorer for the season behind Whittingham who scored 25 times.

The two teams were competing for promotion to the Premier League, the first tier of the English football league system. The play-off final was held at Wembley Stadium in London. Blackpool had played once before at the redeveloped Wembley, defeating Yeovil Town 2–0 in the 2007 Football League One play-off final. Cardiff had played at the redeveloped stadium on two occasions in 2008, in the semi-final and final of the 2007–08 FA Cup. Neither side had played in the Premier League since the league's decision to break away from the Football League in 1992 and Cardiff would have become the first non-English team to play in the league had they won. Holloway had previously met Cardiff in the 2003 Football League Second Division play-off final seven years previously, when his Queens Park Rangers side lost in extra time.

The Championship play-off finals are considered one of the most financially lucrative matches in football. The winners of the 2010 final were believed to receive around £90 million for winning the match and the subsequent promotion to the Premier League due to increased commercial and broadcasting income. The Football League announced that the English national anthem "God Save the Queen", traditionally played before play-off finals would not be included. This decision would later become Football League policy in subsequent matches at Wembley between Welsh and English clubs. It originated from events at the 2008 FA Cup Final between Portsmouth and Cardiff, in which both "God Save the Queen" and the Welsh anthem "Hen Wlad Fy Nhadau" were played and both sets of supporters jeered the opposing anthems.

=== Pre-match ===
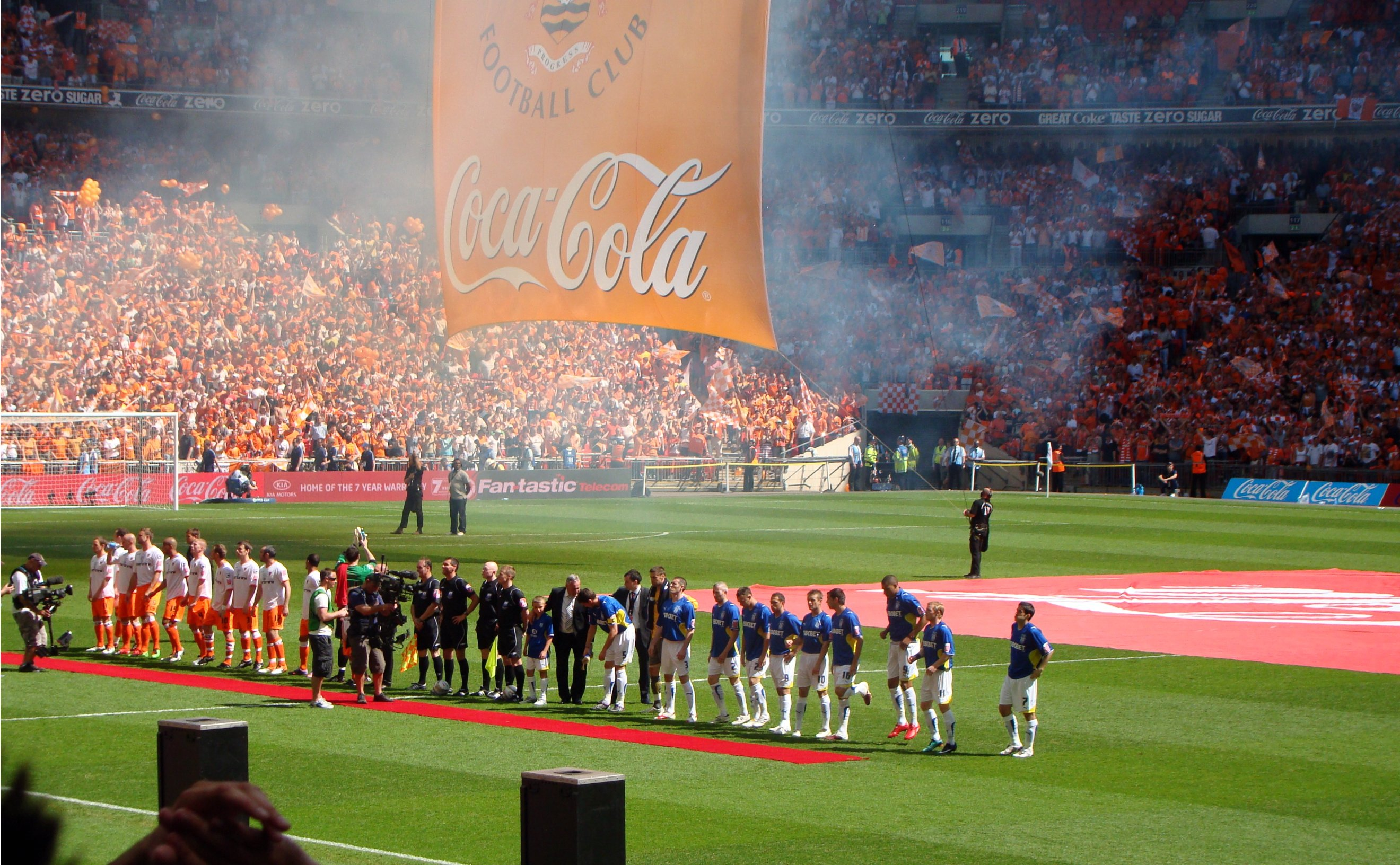
The two teams line-up at Wembley Stadium prior to kick-off

Holloway made no changes to Blackpool's matchday squad, naming the same starting line-up and substitutes used in their play-off semi-final second leg. Jones also made no changes to the side that had started the second leg of the club's play-off semi-final against Leicester City, striker Jay Bothroyd overcoming doubts over a grade two hamstring strain injury to be named in the starting line-up. The only change to Cardiff's matchday squad was Gerrard being selected on the bench in place of Gábor Gyepes.

Cardiff kept their team hotel location secret in order to avoid any attempts of a retaliation attempt by fans of Queens Park Rangers. This followed an incident prior to the 2003 play-off final when the two sides met in which a Cardiff fan was arrested after triggering a false fire alarm call at the Rangers' team hotel during the night prior to the match. Rangers' internet message boards had seen fans threaten a possible "revenge attack". Cardiff manager Dave Jones stated that the club had taken extra precautions, but that "they will probably find out where we are staying. If it goes off, it goes off; but I think there is enough security there." The Cardiff squad would receive a £1.6 million bonus to be shared among the players if they achieved promotion.

The referee for the match was Andre Marriner (Birmingham). He was assisted by Dave Bryan (Lincolnshire) and Adam Watts (Worcestershire), with Mike Jones (Cheshire) acting as the fourth official.

=== Summary ===
Cardiff kicked off the match around 3 p.m. in front of a Wembley Stadium crowd of 82,244. They began as the more attacking of the teams, with Peter Whittingham playing a cross into the box where Chopra was able to beat opposition defender Alex Baptiste to the ball, hitting the crossbar with his resulting shot four minutes into the match. Five minutes later, Whittingham again played in Chopra, allowing the striker to score past Blackpool goalkeeper Matt Gilks into the bottom corner of the net. Four minutes later Cardiff conceded a free kick on the edge of their penalty area when Stephen McPhail was adjudged by Marriner to have deliberately handled the ball. Adam hit the free kick around the wall and into the net to equalise. After fifteen minutes Cardiff's Bothroyd succumbed to his pre-existing hamstring injury and was substituted, being replaced by loan player Kelvin Etuhu. Blackpool were able to gain control of the game as Cardiff adjusted to the change, with both Stephen Crainey and DJ Campbell shooting wide from outside the penalty area.

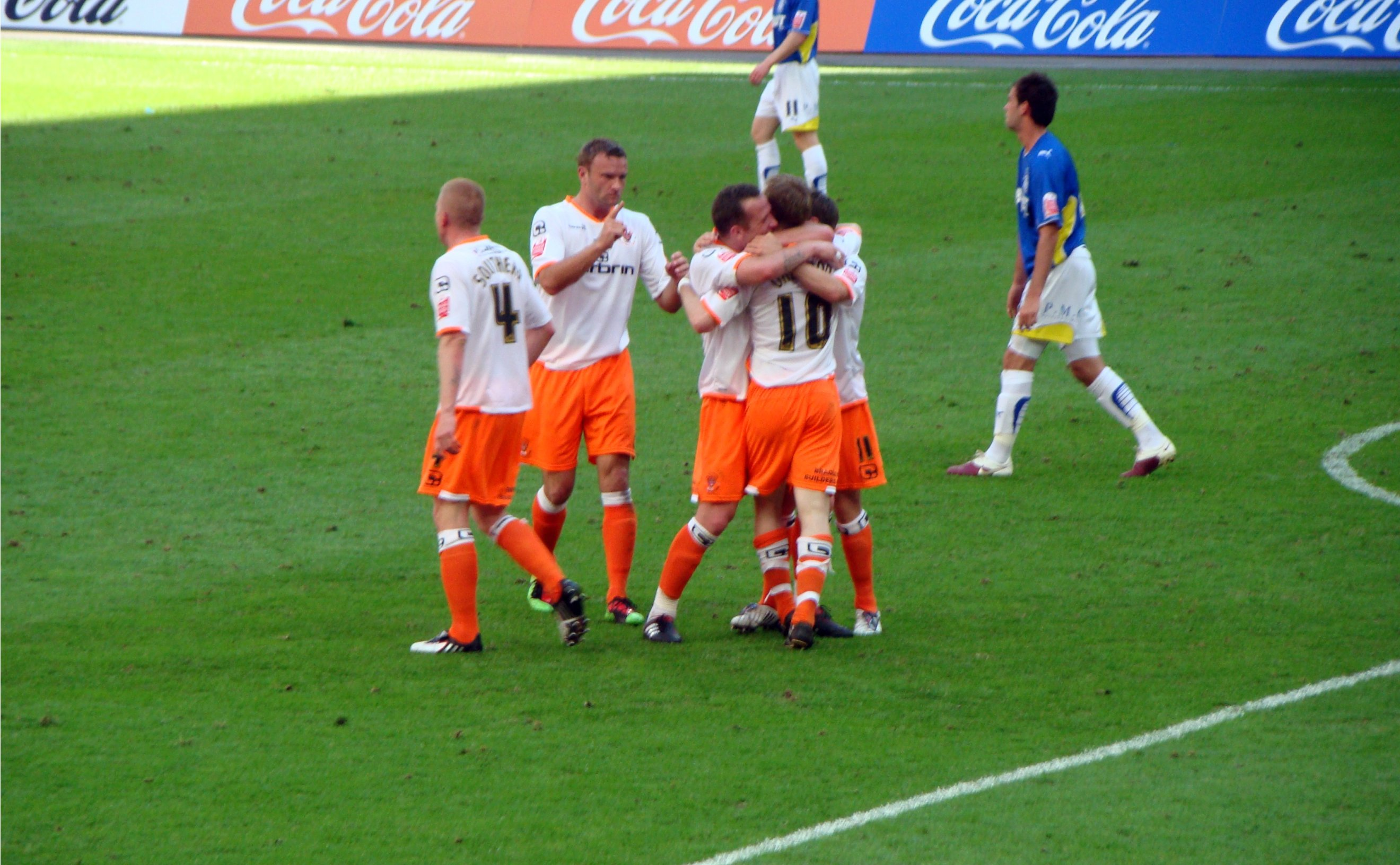
Blackpool players celebrate Brett Ormerod's winning goal

As Cardiff regrouped, they created several opportunities towards the end of the first half. They retook the lead after 36 minutes when Whittingham recorded his second assist of the match by playing a pass to Joe Ledley who beat the advancing Gilks to give Cardiff a 2–1 lead. Blackpool equalised again four minutes later: a Blackpool corner was fumbled by Cardiff goalkeeper Marshall and fell to Evatt whose shot was blocked on the goal line by Kennedy. The ball fell to Gary Taylor-Fletcher, who had hit the post with a shot minutes earlier, and he was able to turn the ball into the net. Blackpool continued to press and they took the lead in first-half injury time when Campbell was tackled by a Cardiff defender only for the ball to deflect to Brett Ormerod who gave Blackpool a 3–2 lead. Ormerod later described the chance, stating "Marshall jumped at me and made himself big so all I could do was to bung the ball straight through his legs". Shortly before the end of the first half, Cardiff defender Darcy Blake managed to score but the goal was ruled out for offside. The half ended with no further score; it was a record for the most goals scored in the first half of a Championship play-off final.

Despite taking the lead, Blackpool continued to attack after half-time, with Taylor-Fletcher creating chances for the side early in the second half. Holloway substituted two of his side's goalscorers within the first fifteen minutes of the half, replacing Taylor-Fletcher and Ormerod with Stephen Dobbie and Ben Burgess. Chopra struck the post for the second time in the match soon after, when Chris Burke had played a pass to the striker, and Ledley and Etuhu both had attempts on goal as Cardiff pushed forward. Cardiff replaced winger Burke with forward Ross McCormack but, as their frustration grew, they committed more players to attacks and Blackpool created several chances late in the game as they looked to counter-attack. However, both sides were unable to convert any chances and the match eventually finished with Blackpool securing a 3–2 victory.

=== Details ===
22 May 2010
15:00 BST

Blackpool	3–2	Cardiff City
Adam 13'; Taylor-Fletcher 41'; Ormerod 45+1'	Report	Chopra 9'; Ledley 37'

Wembley Stadium, London
Attendance: 82,244
Referee: Andre Marriner (Birmingham)

Blackpool	Cardiff City

GK	21	(England) Matt Gilks
RB	31	(Republic of Ireland) Séamus Coleman
CB	15	(England) Alex Baptiste
CB	6	(England) Ian Evatt
LB	3	(Scotland) Stephen Crainey
RM	11	(Wales) David Vaughan	(substituted off) 90+2'
CM	4	(England) Keith Southern
LM	26	(Scotland) Charlie Adam (c)
RW	19	(England) DJ Campbell
LW	10	(England) Brett Ormerod	(substituted off) 60'
CF	12	(England) Gary Taylor-Fletcher	(substituted off) 53'
Substitutes:
GK	1	(England) Paul Rachubka
DF	24	(Wales) Rob Edwards
MF	29	(Scotland) Barry Bannan	(substituted on) 90+2'
FW	7	(Republic of Ireland) Billy Clarke
FW	9	(Republic of Ireland) Ben Burgess	(substituted on) 53'
FW	18	(Jamaica) Jason Euell
FW	33	(Scotland) Stephen Dobbie	(substituted on) 60'
Manager:
(England) Ian Holloway

GK	1	(Scotland) David Marshall
RB	2	(Scotland) Kevin McNaughton	(substituted off) 74'
CB	5	(England) Mark Hudson (c)
CB	23	(Wales) Darcy Blake
LB	3	(Republic of Ireland) Mark Kennedy
RM	11	(Scotland) Chris Burke	(substituted off) 58'
CM	10	(Republic of Ireland) Stephen McPhail
CM	16	(Wales) Joe Ledley
LM	7	(England) Peter Whittingham
CF	9	(England) Jay Bothroyd	(substituted off) 15'
CF	8	(England) Michael Chopra
Substitutes:
GK	20	(Finland) Peter Enckelman
DF	12	(Northern Ireland) Tony Capaldi
DF	14	(Scotland) Paul Quinn
DF	15	(Republic of Ireland) Anthony Gerrard	(substituted on) 74'
MF	17	(Nigeria) Kelvin Etuhu	(substituted on) 15'
MF	28	(England) Aaron Wildig
FW	44	(Scotland) Ross McCormack	(substituted on) 58'
Manager:
(England) Dave Jones

Match officials:

- Assistant referees:
  - Dave Bryan (Lincolnshire)
  - Adam Watts (Worcestershire)
- Fourth official: Mike Jones (Cheshire)

Match rules:

- 90 minutes
- 30 minutes of extra time if necessary
- Penalty shoot-out if scores still level
- Seven named substitutes, of which three may be used

Statistics
	Blackpool	Cardiff City
Total shots	12	11
Shots on target	6	5
Ball possession	56%	44%
Corner kicks	5	6
Fouls committed	13	6
Offsides	2	3
Yellow cards	3	3
Red cards	0	0

== Post-match ==
By winning the match, Blackpool returned to the first tier of English football for the first time since the 1970–71 season and were described in The Daily Telegraph as the "smallest club" to reach the Premier League. The club's home ground, Bloomfield Road, became one of the smallest grounds in Premier League history, initially able to hold around 12,000 spectators until a mid-season upgrade increased the capacity to 16,750. Holloway became only the second Blackpool manager to win promotion in his first season at the club, alongside Les Shannon who managed the 1970–71 team. Holloway described himself as "bursting with pride" over the club's promotion to the Premier League in his first season in the role. Blackpool midfielder Keith Southern was named man of the match.

The club appointed a five-man panel to allocate the promised £5 million promotion bonus. This consisted of chairman Karl Oyston, Holloway, club captain Jason Euell, the club's Professional Footballers' Association representative Paul Rachubka and Stephen Crainey. Oyston later revealed that the club's squad had voted to exclude three players from the bonus payout, former loan signings Marcel Seip and Jay Emmanuel-Thomas and an unnamed contracted player. Emmanuel-Thomas and the unnamed player accepted a lower payout but defender Seip later sued the club over his share of the promotion bonus having been excluded from the payout. Having played seven matches during the season, he was later awarded £72,206 plus legal costs and interest.

Loanees Séamus Coleman and DJ Campbell both returned to their parent clubs at the end of the season. A permanent deal for Leicester City striker Campbell was completed on 31 August 2010 despite Blackpool initially refusing to pay the asking price. Ben Burgess was the only contracted player in the play-off final matchday squad to leave the club prior to the Premier League season, joining Notts County.

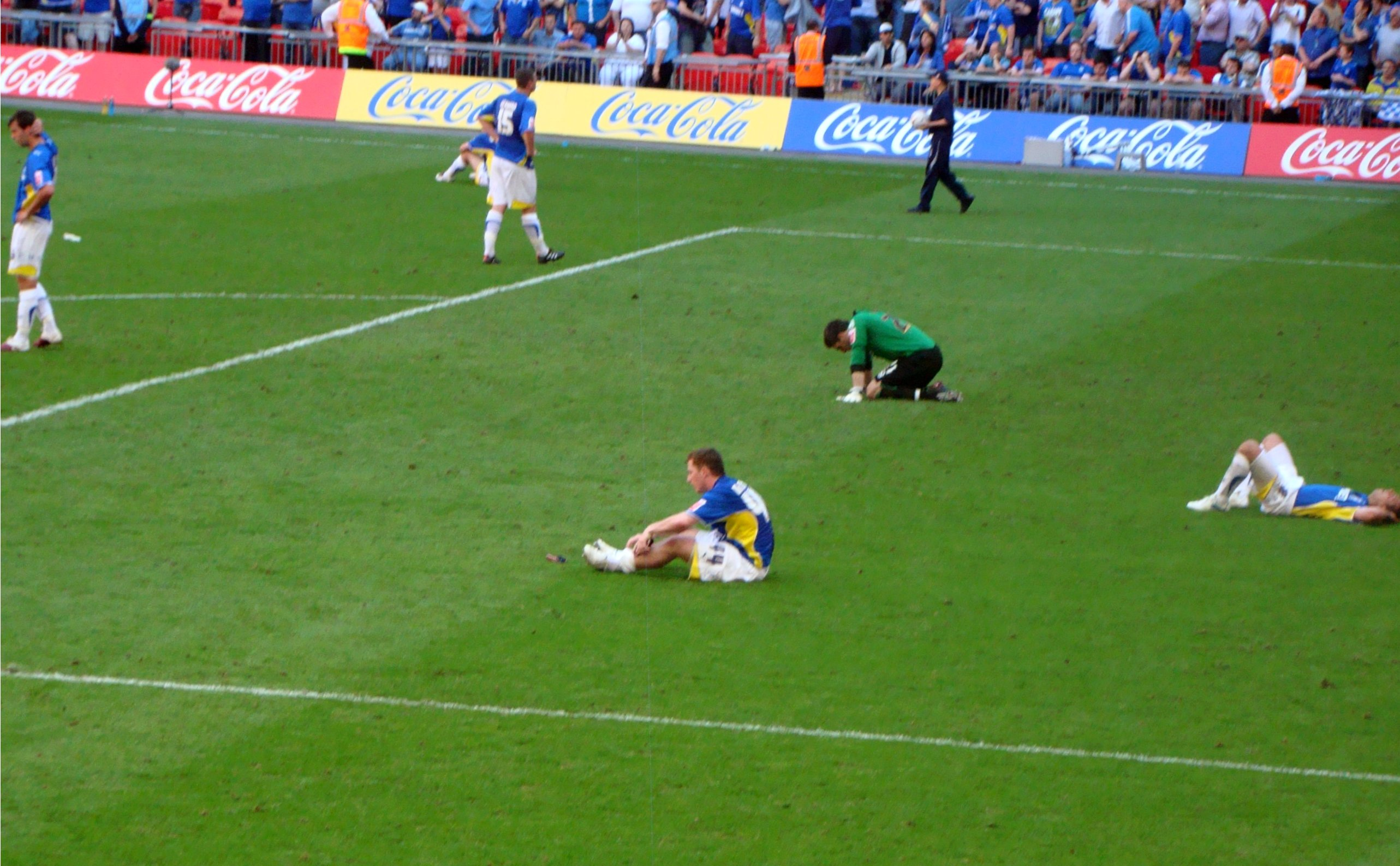
Cardiff City players following the end of the match

The following season, Blackpool, who earned praise for their attacking style of play, were relegated on the final day of the season having lost 4–2 to Manchester United. In their first season back in the Championship, with the promise of another promotion bonus, Holloway led the club to another play-off final where they suffered a 2–1 defeat to West Ham United. In November 2012, Holloway left Blackpool after being offered the manager's job at Crystal Palace. Following Holloway's departure, the club struggled under several managers and were eventually relegated to League One in 2014 and then suffered a second relegation in successive years, to League Two.

Cardiff reached the play-offs again in the 2010–11 season after finishing fourth but suffered defeat in the semi-final, losing 3–0 on aggregate to Reading. The defeat would ultimately cost Cardiff manager Dave Jones his job as the club decided to terminate his contract following an end-of-season performance review. At the time of his departure, Jones was the longest serving manager in the Championship. After a third successive defeat in the play-offs in 2012, Cardiff gained promotion to the Premier League in 2013 by winning the Championship title.

The match was the last game at Cardiff for several players involved including Joe Ledley and substitutes Mark Kennedy, Ross McCormack, Tony Capaldi and Peter Enckelman. The five were among eleven first-team players to depart after the final.
