= 1997–98 Blackpool F.C. season =

English football club season

Blackpool F.C.
1997–98 season
- Owner: Owen Oyston
- Chairman: Vicki Oyston
- Manager: Nigel Worthington
- Stadium: Bloomfield Road
- Division Two: 12th
- FA Cup: Second round
- League Cup: Second round
- FL Trophy: Northern semi-final
- Top goalscorer: League: Phil Clarkson (13); All: Phil Clarkson (18)

The 1997–98 season was Blackpool F.C.'s 90th season (87th consecutive) in the Football League. They competed in the 24-team Division Two, then the third tier of English league football, finishing twelfth.

Gary Megson left the club during the close season, in favour of managing Stockport County. His replacement was Nigel Worthington, who began in a player-manager capacity in his first managerial role.

Phil Clarkson was the club's top scorer, with sixteen goals (thirteen in the league, two in the FA Cup and one in the League Trophy).

== Competitions ==
=== Second Division ===
==== League table ====
Pos	Team	Pld	W	D	L	GF	GA	GD	Pts
10	Chesterfield	46	16	17	13	46	44	+2	65
11	Wigan Athletic	46	17	11	18	64	66	−2	62
12	Blackpool	46	17	11	18	59	67	−8	62
13	Oldham Athletic	46	15	16	15	62	54	+8	61
14	Wycombe Wanderers	46	14	18	14	51	53	−2	60

Rules for classification: In the Football League goals scored (GF) takes precedence over goal difference (GD).

==== Matches ====
Second Division match results
Date	Opponent	Venue	Result F–A	Scorers	Attendance
9 August 1997	Luton Town	H	1–0	Lydiate 11'	6,547
16 August 1997	Bristol City	A	0–2		9,043
23 August 1997	Wycombe Wanderers	H	2–4	Quinn 23', Brabin 90'	4,733
30 August 1997	Bournemouth	A	0–2		4,196
2 September 1997	Wrexham	A	4–3	Ellis 62', 69', 76', Bonner 82'	3,763
7 September 1997	Carlisle United	H	2–1	Ellis 19', Carlisle 90'	7,259
13 September 1997	Wigan Athletic	A	0–3		5,517
20 September 1997	Oldham Athletic	H	2–2	Quinn 42', Philpott 53'	7,174
27 September 1997	Southend United	H	3–0	Bonner 12', Ellis 80', Clarkson 88'	4,542
4 October 1997	Millwall	A	1–2	Ellis 86'	7,042
11 October 1997	Fulham	A	0–1		7,760
18 October 1997	Grimsby Town	H	2–2	Quinn 44', Ellis 77'	5,234
21 October 1997	Chesterfield	H	2–1	Clarkson 42', Quinn 47' (pen.)	3,682
25 October 1997	Bristol Rovers	A	3–0	Bonner 30' Clarkson 48', Preece 53'	6,183
1 November 1997	Watford	A	1–4	Preece 74'	9,723
4 November 1997	Northampton Town	H	1–1	Clarkson 37'	3,685
8 November 1997	Burnley	H	2–1	Clarkson 41', Preece 74'	7,429
18 November 1997	Gillingham	A	1–1	Ellis 90'	5,045
22 November 1997	York City	H	1–0	Strong 68'	4,508
29 November 1997	Walsall	A	1–2	Clarkson 35'	3,933
2 December 1997	Plymouth Argyle	H	0–0		3,281
13 December 1997	Brentford	A	1–3	Preece 4'	3,725
20 December 1997	Preston North End	H	2–1	Preece 21, Philpott 37'	8,342
26 December 1997	Carlisle United	A	1–1	Ormerod 53'	8,010
28 December 1997	Wrexham	H	1–2	Ormerod 17'	5,424
10 January 1998	Luton Town	A	0–3		5,574
17 January 1998	Bournemouth	H	1–0	Clarkson 19'	4,550
24 January 1998	Wycombe Wanderers	A	1–2	Preece 20'	5,073
31 January 1998	Wigan Athletic	H	0–2		5,288
3 February 1998	Bristol City	H	2–2	Preece 54', Bent 88'	3,724
7 February 1998	Oldham Athletic	A	1–0	Bent 56'	6,576
14 February 1998	Millwall	H	3–0	Bryan 7', Malkin 18', Preece 39'	4,455
21 February 1998	Southend United	A	1–2	Brabin 49'	3,340
24 February 1998	Grimsby Town	A	0–1		4,924
28 February 1998	Fulham	H	2–1	Preece 77', Clarkson 85'	5,183
7 March 1998	Watford	H	1–1	Clarkson 88'	5,237
14 March 1998	Northampton Town	A	0–2		6,586
21 March 1998	Gillingham	H	2–1	Malkin 73', Clarkson 83'	4,165
28 March 1998	York City	A	1–1	Preece 5'	3,650
4 April 1998	Walsall	H	1–0	Preece 48'	4,451
7 April 1998	Burnley	A	2–1	Clarkson 45', Bent 51'	13,413
11 April 1998	Plymouth Argyle	A	1–3	Heathcote 28' (o.g.)	5,655
13 April 1998	Brentford	H	1–2	Taylor 81'	3,926
18 April 1998	Preston North End	A	3–3	Clarkson 3', 65', Hills 45'	13,500
25 April 1998	Bristol Rovers	H	1–0	Brabin 68'	7,057
2 May 1998	Chesterfield	A	1–1	Carlisle 86'	4,462

=== FA Cup ===
FA Cup match results
Round	Date	Opponent	Venue	Result F–A	Scorers	Attendance
First round	15 November 1997	Blyth Spartans	H	4–3	Preece 4', Linighan 59', Clarkson 71', 89'	4,814
Second round	6 December 1997	Oldham Athletic	A	1–2	Ellis 83'	6,590

=== Football League Cup ===
Football League Cup match results
Round	Date	Opponent	Venue	Result F–A	Scorers	Attendance
First round, first leg	12 August 1997	Manchester City	H	1–0	Preece 73'	8,084
First round, second leg	26 August 1997	Manchester City	A	0–1 (a.e.t.) (4–2 p)		12,563
Second round, first leg	16 September 1997	Coventry City	H	1–0	Linighan 76'	5,884
Second round, second leg	1 October 1997	Coventry City	A	1–3	Linighan 36'	9,565

=== Football League Trophy ===
Football League Trophy match results
Round	Date	Opponent	Venue	Result F–A	Scorers	Attendance
Second round	6 January 1998	York City	H	1–1 (a.e.t.) (10–9 p)	Clarkson 87'	1,105
Northern quarter-final	27 January 1998	Wigan Athletic	H	1–0	Preece 15'	1,687
Northern semi-final	17 February 1998	Grimsby Town	A	0–1		8,027
