= 2000–01 Blackpool F.C. season =

English football club season

Blackpool F.C.
2000–01 season
- Owner: Owen Oyston
- Chairman: Karl Oyston
- Manager: Steve McMahon
- Division Three: 7th (promoted via play-offs)
- FA Cup: Second round
- League Cup: Second round
- Top goalscorer: League: John Murphy (18); All: John Murphy (23)

The 2000–01 season was Blackpool F.C.'s 93rd season (90th consecutive) in the Football League. They competed in the 24-team Division Three, then the bottom tier of English league football, finishing seventh. They won the end-of-season play-offs and were promoted back to Division Two after a season's absence.

John Murphy was the club's top scorer for the second consecutive season, with 23 goals (eighteen in the league, one in the FA Cup and four in the League Cup).

== Table ==
Pos	Team	Pld	W	D	L	GF	GA	GD	Pts	Qualification or relegation
5	Leyton Orient	46	20	15	11	59	51	+8	75	Qualification for the Third Division play-offs
6	Hull City	46	19	17	10	47	39	+8	74	Qualification for the Third Division play-offs
7	Blackpool (O, P)	46	22	6	18	74	58	+16	72	Qualification for the Third Division play-offs
8	Rochdale	46	18	17	11	59	48	+11	71	
9	Cheltenham Town	46	18	14	14	59	52	+7	68	

Rules for classification: 1) Points; 2) Goal difference; 3) Goals scored
(O) Play-off winners; (P) Promoted
