= 2001 Football League Third Division play-off final =

Association football match

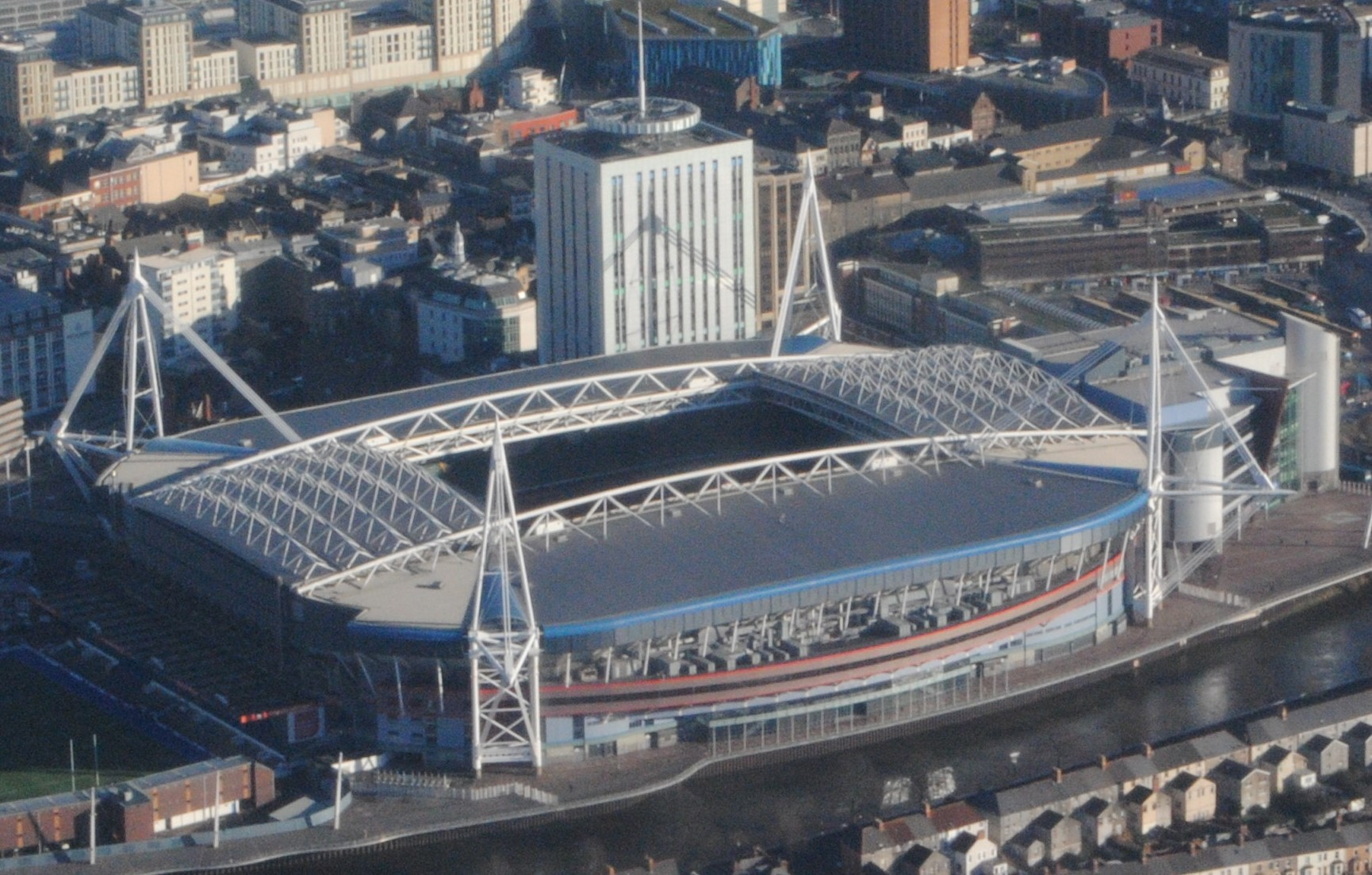
- The Millennium Stadium hosted the final.
Blackpool	Leyton Orient
4	2
- Date: 26 May 2001
- Venue: Millennium Stadium, Cardiff
- Referee: David Pugh
- Attendance: 23,600

The 2001 Football League Third Division play-off final was an association football match which was played on 26 May 2001 at the Millennium Stadium, Cardiff, between Blackpool and Leyton Orient. It was to determine the fourth and final team to gain promotion from the Football League Third Division to the Second Division. The top three teams of the 2000–01 Football League Third Division, Brighton & Hove Albion, Cardiff City and Chesterfield, gained automatic promotion to the Second Division, while those placed from fourth to seventh place in the table took part in play-offs. The winners of the play-off semi-finals competed for the final place for the 2001–02 season in the Second Division. The losing semi-finalists were Hartlepool United and Hull City who had been defeated by Blackpool and Leyton Orient respectively. It was the first season that the play-off finals were contested at the Millennium Stadium during the redevelopment of Wembley Stadium.

The match was refereed by David Pugh in front of a crowd of 23,600. After 27 seconds, an error from Blackpool's goalkeeper Phil Barnes following a backpass from Brian Reid allowed Chris Tate to score, putting Leyton Orient into an early lead. In the 35th minute, the scores were level as Ian Hughes headed in Paul Simpson's corner to make it 1–1. Two minutes later, Houghton restored Leyton Orient's lead with a strike from around 20 yards (18 m) which beat Barnes. A minute before half-time, Blackpool equalised once again as Reid converted Gary Parkinson's cross, and the half ended 2–2. With 13 minutes of the match remaining, Blackpool took the lead for the first time, after Simpson scored following Brett Ormerod's through ball. In the 88th minute Omerod converted a cross from John Hills from around 6 yards (5.5 m) to make it 4–2 to Blackpool who secured promotion to the Second Division.

Blackpool ended their following season in sixteenth position in the Second Division, five places and twelve points ahead of the relegation zone. Leyton Orient's next season saw them finish in eighteenth place in the Third Division.

== Route to the final ==
Football League Third Division final table, leading positions
Pos	Team	Pld	W	D	L	GF	GA	GD	Pts
1	Brighton & Hove Albion	46	28	8	10	73	35	+38	92
2	Cardiff City	46	23	13	10	95	58	+37	82
3	Chesterfield	46	25	14	7	79	42	+37	80 (Note: Chesterfield had 9 points deducted.)
4	Hartlepool United	46	21	14	11	71	54	+17	77
5	Leyton Orient	46	20	15	11	59	51	+8	75
6	Hull City	46	19	17	10	47	39	+8	74
7	Blackpool	46	22	6	18	74	58	+16	72

Notes:

Leyton Orient finished the regular 2000–01 season in fifth position in the Third Division, the fourth tier of the English football league system, two places and three points ahead of Blackpool. Both therefore missed out on the three automatic places for promotion to the Second Division and instead took part in the play-offs to determine the fourth promoted team. Leyton Orient finished five points behind Chesterfield (who were promoted in third place, despite having been deducted nine points for financial irregularities), seven behind Cardiff City and seventeen behind league winners Brighton & Hove Albion. Blackpool were in fifteenth position in the league in mid-November and secured their play-off place on the final day of the season. Leyton Orient lost just one of their final eleven league matches prior to the play-offs.

Blackpool's opponents in their play-off semi-final were Hartlepool United with the first match of the two-legged tie taking place at Bloomfield Road in Blackpool on 13 May 2001. After a goalless first half, the home side took the lead on the hour mark when Brett Ormerod received a pass from Gary Parkinson and struck the ball past Hartlepool goalkeeper Anthony Williams. Seventeen minutes later Ormerod scored his and Blackpool's second goal to secure a 2–0 victory. The return leg was held three days later at Victoria Park in Hartlepool. The visitors took the lead in the 21st minute when Ormerod headed a free kick from Parkinson past Williams. Three minutes into the second half, Hartlepool made it 1–1 when Kevin Henderson scored with a volley from Paul Stephenson's pass. John Hills restored Blackpool's lead a minute later when he headed Ormerod's cross in before Jermaine Easter, a second-half substitute for Hartlepool, was sent off for a foul on Brian Reid. In the 67th minute, Richie Wellens passed to Hills whose cross was converted by Ormerod to make it 3–1. Blackpool secured a 5–1 aggregate victory and progressed to the final.

In the second semi-final, Leyton Orient faced Hull City and the first match was played at Boothferry Park, Hull's home ground, on 13 May 2001. The first half ended goalless with the best chance coming when a flick-on from Kevin Francis found Mark Greaves whose shot struck the Leyton Orient crossbar. John Eyer came on as a substitute for Francis midway through the second half and within minutes had put Hull ahead. Leyton Orient failed to clear a Hull corner and Eyre's shot from the edge of the penalty area beat Ashley Bayes to make it 1–0. The second leg took place three days later at Brisbane Road in Leyton. The home side took the lead a minute before half-time when Steve Watts headed in a cross from Scott Houghton from around 10 yards (9.1 m). Leyton Orient dominated the game and doubled their lead midway through the second half when Matt Lockwood scored from 30 yards (27 m) direct from a free kick. It gave them a 2–1 aggregate victory and saw them progress to the final.

== Match ==
=== Background ===
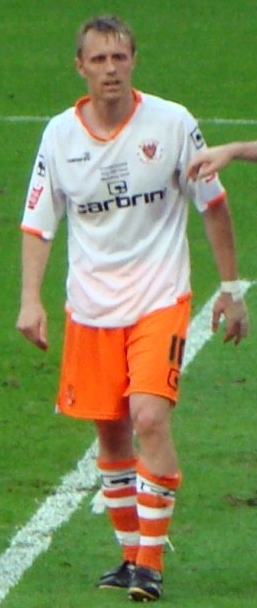
Brett Ormerod (pictured in 2010) scored four times in the play-off semi-finals and once in the final.

This was Blackpool's fourth appearance in the play-offs and their third final: they lost to Torquay United on penalties in the 1991 Football League Fourth Division play-off final at the old Wembley Stadium and defeated Scunthorpe United in a penalty shootout in the following season's final. Blackpool had been relegated to the fourth tier of English football the previous season and were aiming for an immediate return to the Second Division. Leyton Orient were making their third appearance in the final of the play-offs, and had won just once, in the 1989 Football League Fourth Division play-off final which was played over two legs against Wrexham. Orient's defeat came in the 1999 Football League Third Division play-off final against Scunthorpe United at the old Wembley Stadium. Leyton Orient had played in the fourth tier of English football since being relegated in the 1994–95 season.

In the matches between the sides during the regular season, the first ended in a 2–2 at Bloomfield Road in August 2000 while Leyton Orient won their home game 1–0 the following March. Carl Griffiths was the leading scorer for Leyton Orient with 19 goals in the regular season (15 in the league and 4 in the FA Cup) followed by Watts on 9 (8 in the league and 1 in the League Cup). John Murphy led the scoring for Blackpool with 23 goals (18 in the league, 1 in the FA Cup and 4 in the League Cup) followed by Ormerod with 22 (18 in the league, 2 in the FA Cup, 1 in the League Cup and 1 in the Football League Trophy).

The referee for the match was David Pugh. Both sides adopted a 4–4–2 formation for the final. Blackpool were considered favourites to win the match by the Racing Post. As a result of the redevelopment of Wembley Stadium, it was the first time the English Football League play-offs had taken place at the Millennium Stadium in Cardiff, Wales.

=== Summary ===
The match kicked off around 3 p.m. on 26 May 2001 at the Millennium Stadium in Cardiff in front of 23,600 spectators. After 27 seconds, an error from Blackpool's goalkeeper Phil Barnes following a backpass from Reid allowed Chris Tate to score, putting Leyton Orient into an early lead. In the sixth minute, Tate's header from an Andy Harris cross went over the Blackpool crossbar. Three minutes later Bayes saved Danny Coid's attempt to score from close range, before diving to keep out a 25-yard (23 m) strike from Coid in the 13th minute. Parkinson's free kick from 35 yards (32 m) went high over the Leyton Orient bar in the 19th minute before Barnes tipped over a diving header from David McGhee. Another McGhee header was saved by Barnes in the 27th minute. Seven minutes later the scores were level as Ian Hughes headed in Paul Simpson's corner to make it 1–1. Two minutes later, Houghton restored Leyton Orient's lead with a strike from around 20 yards (18 m) which beat Barnes. A minute before half-time, Blackpool equalised once again as Reid converted Parkinson's cross, and the half ended 2–2.

Neither side made any change to their personnel during the interval and three minutes into the second half, Jabo Ibehre's strike from inside the Blackpool penalty area struck the goalpost. In the 58th minute, Murphy's shot from around 20 yards (18 m) cleared the Leyton Orient crossbar. Seven minutes later, Leyton Orient made their first substitutions of the game, with Tate and Wim Walschaerts being replaced by Ahmet Brković and Steve Castle. With 13 minutes of the match remaining, Blackpool took the lead for the first time, after Simpson scored following Ormerod's through ball. In the 82nd minute, Houghton was then substituted for John Martin. Six minutes later Omerod converted a cross from Hills from around 6 yards (5.5 m) to make it 4–2 to Blackpool. With a minute to go, Mike Milligan and Jamie Milligan were brought on for Ormerod and Simpson and after three minutes of injury time, the final whistle was blown, with Blackpool securing promotion to the Second Division with a 4–2 victory.

=== Details ===
26 May 2001
15:00 BST

Blackpool	4–2	Leyton Orient
Hughes 35'; Reid 45'; Simpson 77'; Ormerod 88'	(Report)	Tate 1'; Houghton 37'

Millennium Stadium, Cardiff
Attendance: 23,600
Referee: David Pugh

Blackpool	Leyton Orient

GK	1	Phil Barnes
DF	3	John Hills (yellow card)
DF	33	Gary Parkinson
DF	5	Ian Hughes
DF	6	Brian Reid
MF	12	Danny Coid
MF	14	Richie Wellens	(substituted off) 88'
MF	8	Phil Clarkson
MF	25	Paul Simpson	(substituted off) 88'
FW	16	Brett Ormerod	(substituted off) 89'
FW	9	John Murphy
Substitutes:
DF	23	Neil Murphy
DF	17	Phil Thompson	(substituted on) 89'
MF	4	Steve Bushell
MF	7	Mike Milligan	(substituted on) 88'
MF	32	Jamie Milligan	(substituted on) 88' (yellow card)
Manager:
Steve McMahon

GK	1	Ashley Bayes
DF	2	Matt Joseph
DF	3	Matt Lockwood
DF	4	Dean Smith
DF	6	Simon Downer
MF	15	Wim Walschaerts	(substituted off) 67'
MF	7	Andy Harris
MF	5	David McGhee
MF	27	Scott Houghton	(substituted off) 82'
MF	8	Jabo Ibehre
FW	30	Chris Tate	(substituted off) 66'
Substitutes:
GK	12	Scott Barrett
MF	17	John Martin	(substituted on) 82'
MF	14	Steve Castle	(substituted on) 67'
MF	10	Ahmet Brković	(substituted on) 66'
MF	16	Billy Beall
Manager:
Tommy Taylor

== Post-match ==
The Blackpool manager Steve McMahon "was in total disbelief when the first goal went in" but suggested although his side "didn't play brilliantly but I think we were the best team." His counterpart Tommy Taylor said that his opponents were "the better side in the second half" and that they "deserved to win it." The opening goal, timed at 27 seconds, was the fastest ever scored in a play-off final.

Blackpool ended their following season in sixteenth position in the Second Division, five places and twelve points ahead of the relegation zone. Leyton Orient's next season saw them finish in eighteenth place in the Third Division.
