= 1999–2000 Blackpool F.C. season =

English football club season

Blackpool F.C.
1999–2000 season
- Owner: Owen Oyston
- Chairman: Karl Oyston
- Manager: Nigel Worthington (succeeded by Steve McMahon)
- Division Two: 22nd (relegated)
- FA Cup: Third round
- League Cup: First round
- Top goalscorer: League: John Murphy (10); All: John Murphy (10)

The 1999–2000 season was Blackpool F.C.'s 92nd season (89th consecutive) in the Football League. They competed in the 24-team Division Two, then the third tier of English league football, finishing 22nd. As a result, they were relegated to the league's basement division.

Nigel Worthington resigned as manager during the season. He was replaced by the former Liverpool midfielder Steve McMahon.

The club suffered a tragedy on 30 January 2000 with the death of striker Martin Aldridge in a car crash near Northampton at the age of 25. Aldridge, who had been at Blackpool for 18 months, was on loan at Rushden & Diamonds at the time of his death.

John Murphy was the club's top scorer, with ten goals in all competitions.

On 15 January, Bloomfield Road hosted a "Break The Gate" promotion for the visit of Luton Town. Chairman Karl Oyston pledged that revenue generated from home supporters in excess of the hardcore 3500 would be made available to Steve McMahon for team strengthening. Two days later it was announced that £12,000 had been raised. The scheme was repeated for the visit of Brentford on 29 January.

== Final league table ==
Pos	Team	Pld	W	D	L	GF	GA	GD	Pts	Promotion or relegation
20	Oxford United	46	12	9	25	43	73	−30	45	
21	Cardiff City (R)	46	9	17	20	45	67	−22	44	Relegation to the Third Division
22	Blackpool (R)	46	8	17	21	49	77	−28	41	Relegation to the Third Division
23	Scunthorpe United (R)	46	9	12	25	40	74	−34	39	Relegation to the Third Division
24	Chesterfield (R)	46	7	15	24	34	63	−29	36	Relegation to the Third Division

Rules for classification: 1) Points; 2) Goal difference; 3) Goals scored
(R) Relegated

== Results ==
Blackpool's score comes first

=== Legend ===
Win	Draw	Loss

=== Football League Second Division ===
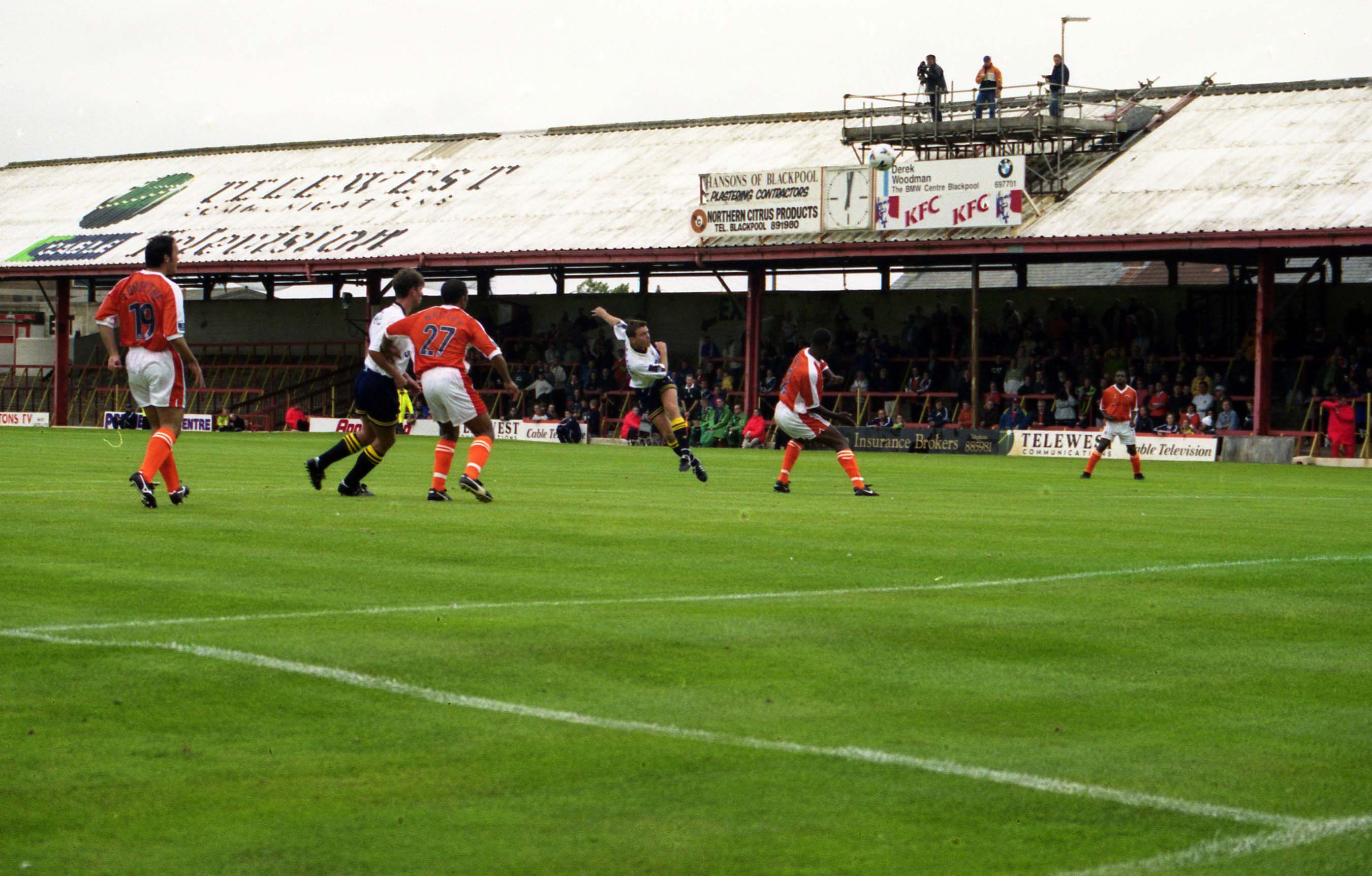
Blackpool hosting Oxford United on 30 August

Match	Date	Opponent	Venue	Result	Attendance	Scorers
1	7 August 1999	Wrexham	H	2–1	5,008	Ormerod (2)
2	14 August 1999	Luton Town	A	2–3	5,176	Ormerod, Nowland
3	21 August 1999	Gillingham	H	1–1	4,203	Murphy
4	28 August 1999	Brentford	A	0–2	5,353	
5	30 August 1999	Oxford United	H	1–1	3,670	Carlisle
6	4 September 1999	Bristol City	A	2–5	8,439	Ormerod, Murphy
7	11 September 1999	Notts County	A	1–2	5,512	Carlisle
8	18 September 1999	AFC Bournemouth	H	0–0	4,471	
9	25 September 1999	Wycombe Wanderers	H	1–2	3,452	Ormerod
10	2 October 1999	Bristol Rovers	A	1–3	7,715	Ormerod
11	9 October 1999	Chesterfield	A	0–0	2,804	
12	16 October 1999	Bury	H	0–5	5,270	
13	19 October 1999	Oldham Athletic	H	1–2	3,845	Murphy
14	23 October 1999	Wycombe Wanderers	A	2–0	5,021	Nowland, Lee
15	2 November 1999	Cardiff City	A	1–1	4,223	Murphy
16	6 November 1999	Wigan Athletic	H	2–2	4,535	Murphy, Durnin
17	14 November 1999	Burnley	A	0–1	12,898	
18	23 November 1999	Millwall	H	1–2	2,819	Murphy
19	27 November 1999	Cambridge United	H	2–1	4,040	Murphy, Clarkson
20	4 December 1999	Wrexham	A	1–1	2,668	Hills
21	18 December 1999	Preston North End	A	0–3	16,821	
22	26 December 1999	Stoke City	H	1–2	5,214	Nowland
23	28 December 1999	Scunthorpe United	A	0–1	4,476	
24	3 January 2000	Colchester United	H	1–1	3,462	Bent
25	8 January 2000	Reading	A	1–1	7,297	Matthews
26	15 January 2000	Luton Town	H	3–3	5,262	Ablett, Clarkson, Bushell
27	22 January 2000	Gillingham	A	3–1	6,805	Richardson, Matthews, Bushell
28	29 January 2000	Brentford	H	0–1	5,270	
29	5 February 2000	Oxford United	A	1–0	5,179	Murphy
30	8 February 2000	Reading	H	0–2	4,791	
31	12 February 2000	Bristol City	H	1–2	5,066	Murphy
32	19 February 2000	Cambridge United	A	2–0	4,636	Carlisle, Newell
33	26 February 2000	AFC Bournemouth	A	0–2	4,464	
34	4 March 2000	Notts County	H	2–1	4,277	Lumsdon, Clarkson
35	7 March 2000	Wigan Athletic	A	1–5	6,451	Gill
36	11 March 2000	Cardiff City	H	2–2	5,015	Gill, Hills
37	18 March 2000	Millwall	A	1–1	10,506	Gill
38	21 March 2000	Burnley	H	1–1	8,029	Gill
39	25 March 2000	Stoke City	A	0–3	10,002	
40	1 April 2000	Preston North End	H	0–0	9,042	
41	8 April 2000	Colchester United	A	1–1	3,351	Thomas
42	15 April 2000	Scunthorpe United	H	0–2	5,542	
43	22 April 2000	Bury	A	2–3	3,857	Gill, Newell
44	24 April 2000	Bristol Rovers	H	2–1	5,635	Gill, Thomas
45	29 April 2000	Oldham Athletic	A	1–1	6,290	Carlisle
46	6 May 2000	Chesterfield	H	2–2	3,860	Gill, Coid

=== FA Cup ===
Round	Date	Opponent	Venue	Result	Attendance	Scorers
R1	30 October 1999	Stoke City	H	2–0	4,721	Carlisle, Nowland
R2	20 November 1999	Hendon	H	2–0	2,975	Clarkson, Durnin
R3	13 December 1999	Arsenal	A	1–3	34,143	Clarkson

=== Football League Cup ===
Round	Date	Opponent	Venue	Result	Attendance	Scorers
R1 1st Leg	10 August 1999	Tranmere Rovers	H	2–1	3,298	Hughes, Clarkson
R1 2nd Leg	24 August 1999	Tranmere Rovers	A	1–3	4,800	Clarkson

=== Football League Trophy ===
Round	Date	Opponent	Venue	Result	Attendance	Scorers
R1	7 December 1999	Notts County	A	1–0	4,721	Clarkson
R2	11 January 2000	Mansfield Town	A	1–0	1,844	Matthews
QF	25 January 2000	Stoke City	H	1–2	4,943	Jaszczun

== Squad ==
Note: Flags indicate national team as defined under FIFA eligibility rules; some limited exceptions apply. Players may hold more than one non-FIFA nationality.

No.	Pos.	Nation	Player
1	GK	ENG	Tony Caig
2	DF	ENG	Andy Couzens
3	DF	ENG	John Hills
4	DF	ENG	David Bardsley
5	DF	ENG	Clarke Carlisle
6	DF	WAL	Ian Hughes
7	MF	ENG	Junior Bent
8	MF	ENG	Phil Clarkson
10	MF	ENG	Steve Bushell
11	FW	ENG	Brett Ormerod
12	FW	ENG	Mike Newell
14	MF	ENG	Adam Nowland
15	DF	ENG	Barry Shuttleworth
16	DF	ENG	Phil Thompson
17	MF	ENG	Phil Robinson
18	MF	ENG	Steve Garvey

No.	Pos.	Nation	Player
19	MF	ENG	Richard Forsyth
20	DF	ENG	Paul Beesley
21	GK	ENG	Phil Barnes
22	MF	ENG	Wayne Gill
23	FW	ENG	Darren Connell
24	DF	ENG	Danny Coid
25	MF	ENG	Rickie Lambert
26	FW	ENG	John Murphy
27	DF	ENG	Gary Ablett
28	GK	ENG	Adam Rachel
30	MF	ENG	Kevin Richardson
31	DF	ENG	Tommy Jaszczun
33	FW	WAL	James Thomas (on loan from Blackburn Rovers)
34	DF	WAL	Eifion Jones
35	MF	ENG	Richie Wellens
36	DF	ENG	Wayne Maden

=== Left club during season ===
Note: Flags indicate national team as defined under FIFA eligibility rules; some limited exceptions apply. Players may hold more than one non-FIFA nationality.

No.	Pos.	Nation	Player
9	FW	ENG	Martin Aldridge (died)
12	MF	ENG	Marvin Bryan (to Bury)
22	MF	ENG	David Lee (on loan from Wigan Athletic)
22	MF	ENG	Rob Matthews (on loan from Stockport County)
22	MF	ENG	Chris Lumsdon (on loan from Sunderland)

No.	Pos.	Nation	Player
27	MF	NIR	Jim Whitley (on loan from Manchester City)
27	MF	ENG	John Durnin (on loan from Portsmouth)
27	FW	ENG	Brian Quailey (on loan from West Bromwich)
29	DF	NIR	Nigel Worthington (player-manager; to Norwich)
32	FW	JAM	Darren Byfield (on loan from Aston Villa)
