= Jabo Ibehre =

English footballer (born 1983)

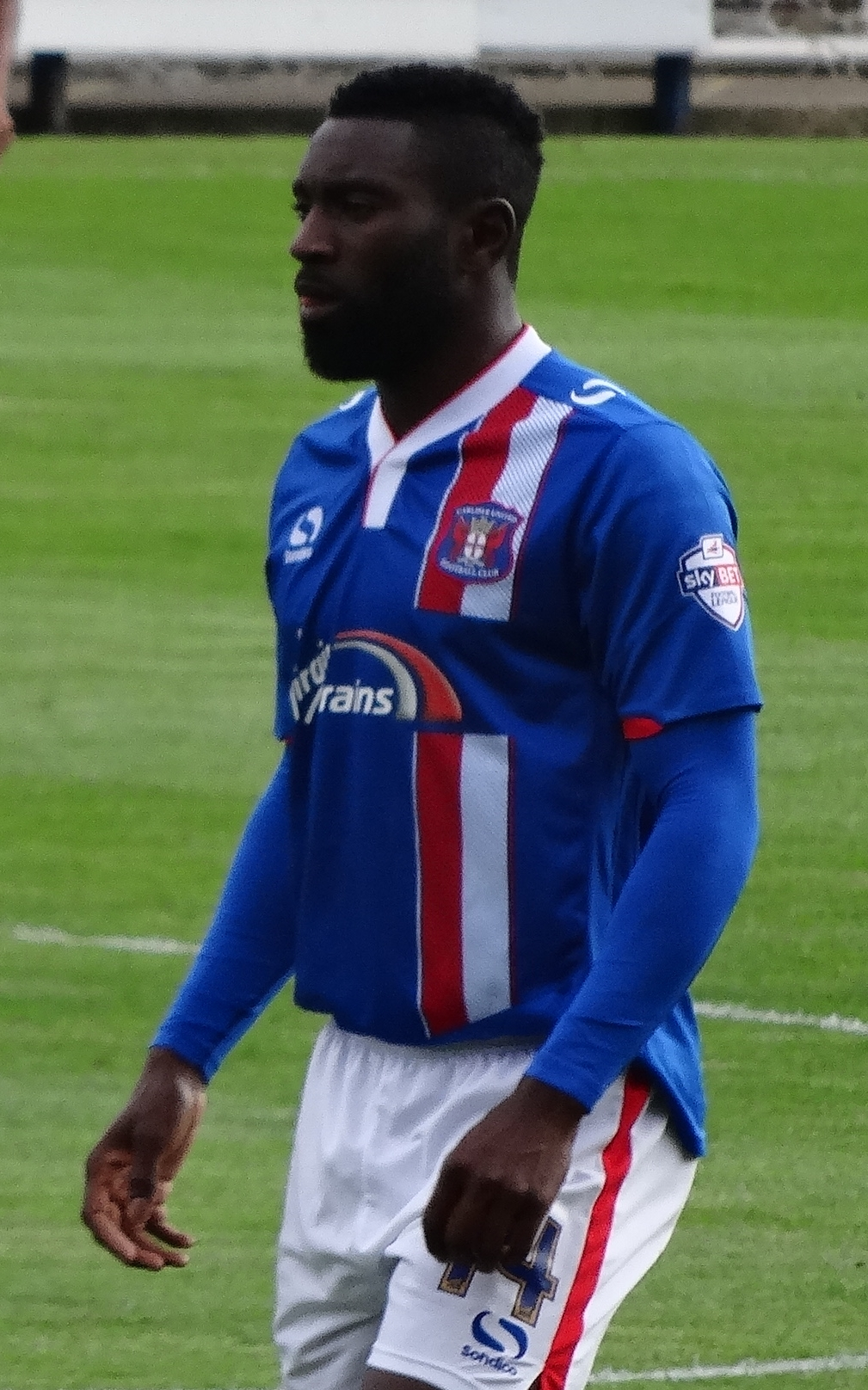
- Ibehre playing for Carlisle United in 2015

Personal information
- Full name: Jabo Oshevire Michael Ibehre
- Date of birth: 28 January 1983 (age 43)
- Place of birth: Islington, England
- Height: 6 ft 4 in (1.94 m)
- Position: Forward

Youth career
- 1996–2000: Leyton Orient

Senior career*
Years	Team	Apps	(Gls)
2000–2008	Leyton Orient	209	(36)
2008–2009	Walsall	39	(10)
2009–2013	Milton Keynes Dons	94	(12)
2009	→ Southend United (loan)	4	(0)
2010	→ Stockport County (loan)	20	(5)
2012	→ Colchester United (loan)	14	(4)
2013–2015	Colchester United	58	(12)
2014–2015	→ Oldham Athletic (loan)	11	(2)
2015	→ Barnsley (loan)	9	(2)
2015–2017	Carlisle United	74	(27)
2017–2020	Cambridge United	67	(11)
Total		599	(121)
- * Club domestic league appearances and goals

Jabo Oshevire Michael Ibehre (born 28 January 1983) is an English former professional footballer who played as a forward.

Ibehre made over 200 appearances for Leyton Orient between 2000 and 2008, before moving onto Walsall. A successful season with Walsall resulted in a move to Milton Keynes Dons in 2009. Ibehre's spell with the Dons saw him in and out of the first-team as he was sent out on loan on three occasions with Southend United, Stockport County and Colchester United. After an impressive loan stint with Colchester, Ibehre permanently signed for the U's in January 2013. He was later loaned out by Colchester to Oldham Athletic and Barnsley, and then Carlisle United on a permanent basis in 2015. Ibehre has been capped by England at youth level.

== Career ==
=== Leyton Orient ===
Ibehre was born in Islington, London. He grew up as an Arsenal fan, and began his professional career at Leyton Orient at the age of 13. He turned down the opportunity to join Tottenham Hotspur at the age of 15 to remain with the O's, where he progressed through their youth system, before making his full debut at the age of 17. His first match saw him replace Wim Walschaerts after 85 minutes on 7 March 2000 as the O's fell to a 2–1 Division Three defeat to Northampton Town at Sixfields Stadium. He played two further games in the 1999–2000 season, with substitute appearances away to Swansea City and Hull City.

==== 2000–01 season ====
Ibehre scored in Orient's pre-season friendly against Enfield on 19 July 2000, scoring the winner for a young O's side that defeated their counterparts 2–1. His first appearance of the 2000–01 season came as a late substitute in Orient's 2–1 loss to Kidderminster Harriers on 16 September. Ibehre featured only three further times in 2000, with appearances from the bench in Orient's 1–1 draw with Newcastle United and a 2–0 reverse at Brighton & Hove Albion in September, and another substitute appearance against Cheltenham Town in a 1–1 draw in November. He didn't make a single first-team appearance for the club until the reverse fixture on 28 April 2001, when the O's held Cheltenham to a 0–0 draw at Brisbane Road. He made his first professional start in the final game of the season on 5 May 2001, an away game with Macclesfield Town. Repaying the faith manager Tommy Taylor had shown in him, Ibehre duly scored his first professional goals in the 2–0 win, netting just before the half-time break and in the 77th minute to secure Orient's place in the Football League play-offs. This came on the back of helping the under-19 side to the Youth Alliance league and cup double, where Ibehre had scored 19 goals in 26 appearances. With the cup final being played at the Millennium Stadium in Cardiff, Ibehre was determined to play at the stadium again to help his side gain promotion to Division Two.

Ibehre played in both play-off semi-final legs against Hull City, starting in the 1–0 away defeat on 13 May, and also starting in the 2–0 home win on 16 May to put Leyton Orient through to the play-off final at the Millennium Stadium against Blackpool. He played for the full 90 minutes in the final on 26 May as his side crashed to a 4–2 defeat after leading twice in the first-half.

==== 2001–02 season ====
After the disappointment of missing out on promotion, Ibehre began the 2001–02 pre-season scoring goals when he netted a brace in a friendly with Saffron Walden as he looked to cement a regular place in the starting line-up for the new season. He scored again in another friendly win against Dartford before starting the opening game of the season on 11 August 2001, a 1–1 draw with Cheltenham. He sealed his first goal of the season in a 2–0 win over Hartlepool United on 27 August and scored his second of the campaign on 15 September, the opening goal in a 2–1 victory against Rushden & Diamonds. Ibehre began proceedings in an eventual 4–2 win at home to Rochdale on 27 October and he secured his fourth of the season with a header from inside the six yard box on 20 November in a 3–0 victory against Oxford United. For his next goal, Ibehre described his 20-yard equaliser in Orient's 2–1 win against Lincoln City in the FA Cup as "probably the best goal" he had scored in his so-far short career.

Ibehre was ruled out of action from mid-January to mid-March 2002 on the back of a double groin operation. He made his return to action as a substitute in Orient's 2–0 triumph over Mansfield Town on 19 March. He went on to make a total of 33 appearances in all competitions during the season, netting himself five goals. In addition, Ibehre was awarded the club's 'Goal of the Season' award at the end of the campaign.

==== 2002–03 season ====
Having spent the summer out of action due to a reaction to his groin operation, Ibehre returned to reserve team action in late August 2002. His 2002–03 season didn't kick off until 14 September, replacing Gary Taylor-Fletcher in a 1–1 draw with Lincoln City at Brisbane Road. His first goal of the season came on 2 October in a 3–2 defeat to Premier League side Birmingham City, netting two minutes after coming on as an 80th-minute substitute to give the Orient faithful hope of a comeback after Stern John's hat-trick. He once again scored in a 3–2 defeat, on this occasion at the hands of Kidderminster at Aggborough. His first put the O's ahead after 19 minutes, and again on 60 minutes after the Harriers had equalised late in the first half. He notched again in the following game two days later, lifting his shot over Carlisle United goalkeeper Matt Glennon in a 2–1 victory for Orient. Ibehre continued his good form by scoring in a 2–0 win at home to Hull on 18 January 2003 and salvaging a late 1–1 draw with Cambridge United on 28 January. Ibehre said that despite hitting five goals in six games, he had been "playing through the pain barrier" because of his ongoing injury problems. Despite this, he ended the season with 28 appearances to his name, but could only muster six goals.

==== 2003–04 season ====
With his contract set to expire in May 2004, Ibehre's 2003–04 season kicked off with a bang, netting three goals in five games. He opened his account for the campaign in a League Cup defeat to Cardiff City on 12 August 2003, scoring Orient's consolation goal midway through the second half. His next goal arrived two games later on 20 September when he rescued a point for the O's with a last minute equaliser against Scunthorpe United. He had been ruled out of action for almost one month prior due to his injury woes. His third goal of the season arrived on 30 September, the solitary goal in a win away at Carlisle United.

Netting his fourth goal of the season on 21 October against Bristol Rovers at the Memorial Stadium in a 1–1 draw, Ibehre had to wait until the reverse fixture on 2 March to score his fifth and final goal of the term, despite ending the season with 39

==== 2004–05 season ====
Ibehre remained with Orient for the 2004–05 season, signing a two-year contract extension as he looked to put his injury troubles behind him and retain a place in manager Martin Ling's starting line-up. He got off the mark for the season on 14 August 2004 in the O's 2–1 win at Cheltenham. He took his tally to two for the season when he opened the scoring against Woking in a 3–0 Football League Trophy match on 28 September. He netted what would prove to be a crucial goal on 23 October as Lincoln and Orient played out a seven-goal thriller at Sincil Bank. The O's came out on top, winning 4–3, with Ibehre's goal levelling the match at 2–2 shortly before half time. With Ibehre back in the starting line-up due to injuries to other strikers, he was looking to hold down a regular starting berth. He justified his place in the team with a goal in Orient's 2–0 win over Cambridge United on 2 November in the Football League Trophy.

In December 2004, Ibehre was ruled out for an estimated three months with a knee injury that required specialist treatment. In late February 2005, it was announced that Ibehre faced another four weeks out of action, before returning to reserve team action on 22 March 2005 in a 1–1 draw with Rushden. However, he did not recover to return to the first-team before the end of the season, resulting four goals in 25 appearances between August and mid-December for Ibehre.

==== 2005–06 season ====
Ibehre declared himself fit for the new season in early September 2005, having finally recovered from his long-running knee problem. He scored in his first appearance for nine months against Barnet in a 3–2 win on 10 September, putting the ball in the back of the net from eight yards out. He scored again on 24 September, helping his side come from behind to beat Carlisle 3–2 with a fierce shot, before notching his third of the season in only four games against Torquay United on 27 September. His next goal didn't arrive until Boxing Day in the O's 5–1 rout against Rushden & Diamonds, He then bagged goals in successive wins against Notts County, a 1–0 on 31 December, and giving Orient the lead in a 2–1 away victory at Boston United on 2 January 2006.

Ibehre came off the bench at half-time on 31 January to bag himself a brace in a 3–3 draw with Bristol Rovers. He scored 90 seconds after his introduction, striking the ball home from ten yards, before lobbing Pirates goalkeeper Scott Shearer ten minutes later for his second goal. Ibehre's eight goals in 38 appearances helped the O's to automatic promotion to League One on the final day of the league season, beating Oxford United 3–2 at the Kassam Stadium and sending their opposition out of the Football League. After the season came to a close and with his contract expiring, he made it known to manager Martin Ling that he wanted to stay and sign a new contract and play at a higher level in League One. Ling himself stated that he wanted to keep his squad together and was ready to open contract talks with Ibehre and his other out of contract players.

==== 2006–07 season ====
Offered a two-year contract extension by the club in May 2006, Ibehre signed the deal at the end of the month, saying that it was "great to get the contract signed this early on". He made his first League One appearance as a substitute midway through the second half in Orient's 3–0 defeat to Port Vale at Vale Park on 5 August, but featured mainly as a substitute during the early stages of the season. However, on 31 August, both Brighton & Hove Albion and Wycombe Wanderers tabled £100,000 bids for the Leyton Orient striker late on transfer deadline day. While Albion had offered Ibehre better personal terms than both Orient and Wycombe, the player could not make up his mind and decided to remain with the O's. Brighton manager Mark McGhee later claimed that the club intended to obtain the player on loan with a view for a permanent deal during the next transfer window. Ibehre had originally submitted a transfer request before his change of heart, and later said that "it was nice to see that other clubs were interested in me, but I love this club. I'm an Orient player and always have been."

Ibehre returned to the fold for Orient to score his first goal of the season on 14 October as they let a two-goal lead slip to draw 3–3 with Oldham Athletic at Boundary Park. His strike on 13 January 2007 opened the scoring against Brentford, but the Bees hit back to draw the match 2–2. During the January transfer window, manager Martin Ling said he was prepared to let Ibehre leave the club if the right offer was received for him. Ibehre, however, stated that he was willing to stay and fight for his place in the first-team. He scored his third of the season with the third goal in a 4–0 away win over Crewe Alexandra on 27 January, before he secured a late winner with a header in the home tie with Port Vale on 3 February. His final tally ended with four League One goals and he made 35 first-team appearances across the season.

==== 2007–08 season ====
Ibehre's 2007–08 season kicked off in October with a goal at Gillingham in Orient's 3–1 defeat, having missed the start of the season and much of pre-season with an ankle injury. He nodded his second of the season in on 20 October to help his side defeat Port Vale 3–1 at Brisbane Road. Ibehre duly announced Orient's intentions of attaining promotion glory as the win put the O's top of the League One table. High on confidence, Ibehre scored in the following game in what ended a 4–2 win for Doncaster Rovers. He picked up another knock to his ankle in early November, before receiving the first red card of his career – a second bookable offence in a pulsating FA Cup replay with Bristol Rovers on 27 November. With the scores level after normal time and Orient already a man down, Ibehre was judged to have handled the ball in the first period of extra time. The O's went on to lose the match 6–5 following a penalty shoot-out.

Ibehre scored his first goal since October on 2 February 2008 as he came on in a 2–2 draw with Southend United to score a 90th-minute equaliser for the home side. Ibehre, who had missed all of Januarys matches with an achilles injury hoped that the goal against Southend would kick-start his stuttering season. He delivered in their 1–0 away win against Luton Town on 16 February and scored again two weeks later with a header in a 1–1 draw with Brighton. Ibehre had hoped that his performances had done enough to convince Martin Ling to hand him a new contract when it expired in the summer of 2008, stating that "I want to stay here next season". He scored his seventh and final goal of the campaign on the final day of the season as Orient defeated Bristol Rovers 3–1 at home, with Ibehre rounding off the scoring in the final minute of the game from the substitutes bench.

Despite his goal in the final game of the season, manager Martin Ling decided not to renew Ibehre's contract at the club just two days after what was his final appearance for the O's. Former Orient teammate and Brentford boss Andy Scott ruled himself out of signing Ibehre, explaining that "Jabo has got all the attributes to be a decent player, but I am not interested in signing him... he has not exactly set the world alight in terms of his goalscoring record. I can't see Jabo fitting in to our style of play." Ibehre played in almost 250 games for the club during his eight-year stay, scoring 41 goals. Almost half of his appearances came from the substitutes bench.

=== Walsall ===
Walsall signed Ibehre up following his release from Leyton Orient on 2 July 2008, signing a one-year contract at the club. He scored in the pre-season friendly win against Port Vale on 3 August, and looked to have cemented his place in the starting lineup for the opening League One fixture against Yeovil Town. He started the game on 9 August and duly scored on his professional debut for the club, netting a 77th-minute equaliser after Gavin Tomlin had opened the scoring for Yeovil in the tenth minute. He brought his tally to two goals in two league games on 16 August when he fired home an 89th-minute winner in the Saddlers 2–1 win at home to Scunthorpe. At this stage, Ibehre kept his goal target for the season a closely guarded secret, but did say that he believed the decision to leave Brisbane Road would make him a better player and the time was right for a fresh challenge. Manager Jimmy Mullen was impressed by Ibehre's early performances, where he formed a good partnership with former England international striker Michael Ricketts.

Ibehre scored his third of the campaign with a shot on the turn as Walsall handed a 2–1 defeat to Carlisle on 27 September. His fourth came in a Football League Trophy win against Cheltenham Town on 7 October, securing the equaliser on 61 minutes, before adding his fifth of the season in a 3–2 defeat to Hartlepool at the Bescot Stadium on 18 October. He netted his next goal on 27 January 2009, in a 3–2 away defeat to Swindon Town, ending his goal drought and handing him a confidence boost. A 2–0 win over Northampton Town at Sixfields saw Ibehre grab his seventh goal of the season, slotting home a 90th-minute goal to secure victory for the Saddlers. Manager Chris Hutchings, who replaced Mullen in January, said that Ibehre was "trying too hard" and putting pressure on himself to score a goal after a barren run of only one goal in twelve games. He finally returned to his goalscoring ways on 4 April to level scores with Millwall at The Den in a game that ended in a 3–1 defeat for Walsall. He thanked the Walsall fans for their faith in him and cited this as the reason he had not doubted himself during the periods of the season where goals had been hard to come by. He scored a brace to bring his goal tally to ten goals for the season on 18 April as Walsall allowed their two-goal advantage to slip and eventually lose 3–2 at home to Huddersfield Town on 18 April. He scored in what was to be his final game of the season on 25 April, netting a 25-yard shot, the only goal of the game as Walsall overcame Milton Keynes Dons. He limped off after 71 minutes with a hamstring injury, prematurely ending his season. He made 43 appearances and scored eleven times across all competitions for the club.

With Ibehre and several other Walsall players out-of-contract, manager Chris Hutchings handed his players an ultimatum to sign a renewed contract by mid-June or risk having their offers withdrawn. On 9 June, it was reported that Ibehre had rejected a new deal to remain at the Bescot Stadium and instead join Milton Keynes Dons.

=== Milton Keynes Dons ===
Having impressed Milton Keynes Dons manager Roberto Di Matteo with his ability, Ibehre signed for the club on a two-year deal on 11 June 2009. He had effectively scored the goal in his final fixture of the 2008–09 season that ended the Dons promotion hopes. Ibehre admitted the temptation of a new challenge convinced him to make the switch.

==== 2009–10 season ====
Ibehre began the 2009–10 season on 15 August as a substitute for Danny Woodards in the Dons 0–0 draw with Swindon at the County Ground. He grabbed his first goal for the club in the following game on 18 August against Tranmere Rovers during a 1–0 win. Following this however, he made just 10 appearances between August and December, scoring once and making only three starts, and so was made available for loan.

==== Southend United loan ====
Fellow League One club Southend United snapped up Ibehre on loan on 27 November 2009 for a one-month period. This meant that he would be available for the club's next four games in the run up to Christmas. Ibehre was reunited with his youth development officer from Leyton Orient, Paul Brush, who was assistant manager for Southend at the time. He made his debut for the Shrimpers in their 3–0 home defeat to Norwich City on 1 December, playing the full 90 minutes. He also appeared in the 1–0 defeat to Charlton Athletic at the Valley on 5 December and the 3–2 win over Hartlepool United on 12 December. In his final game of his loan spell against Exeter City on 19 December at St James Park, Ibehre received only the second red card of his career when he was sent off for clashing with Grecians defender Richard Duffy. This handed him a three-match suspension and ended his loan spell. He returned to MK Dons having failed to find the back of the net in four games.

==== Stockport County loan ====
Ibehre, alongside four other MK Dons players and Colchester United midfielder David Perkins all joined crisis club Stockport County in loan deals on 19 January 2010, with Ibehre signing until the end of the season. He made his debut alongside his fellow loanees in a 1–0 home defeat by Swindon the day they all joined the club. New MK Dons manager Paul Ince said that Ibehre was sent out on loan to hand them a chance of a long-term future with the Dons, stating that his loan players fate was in their own hands. His second match against Carlisle United ended as a 0–0 draw, a result which halted a slide of twelve successive defeats for the Hatters. However, Ibehre was shown his second red card in three games when he was sent off for a second bookable offence. He returned from suspension on 13 February to score a brace and his first goals for the club to secure a 2–2 draw against Colchester United, coming back from 2–0 down after only 18 minutes.

Ibehre scored his third goal for the club and his side's first goal in nine-and-a-half hours of football on 3 April when Stockport held his former club Walsall to a 1–1 draw at Edgeley Park, coolly slotting home a penalty kick. He scored in their next game, a trip to Carrow Road to face table-topping Norwich City. The Hatters made the canaries work hard for their three points as the side battled but were defeated 2–1, with Ibehre's strike separating Norwich's goals. He scored his fifth and final goal for the club against another of his former employers, Southend United, opening the scoring with a glancing header in a 2–1 defeat for Stockport on 1 May. Ibehre made his 20th and final appearance for Stockport when they were defeated by Tranmere Rovers at home on 8 May, leaving them bottom of the League One table and relegated.

==== 2010–11 season ====
Ibehre returned to MK Dons for the 2010–11 season, where he appeared briefly in the opening day win over Walsall as an 88th-minute substitute. He started in a League Cup victory over Dagenham & Redbridge on 10 August, netting a brace to give the Dons a 2–1 win. He didn't score again until 8 January 2011 when he grabbed an equaliser in a 1–1 draw with Exeter. One week later, he was handed a start against Tranmere and suitably scored again for his fourth goal of the campaign, providing the assist for Daniel Powell's opener before getting on the scoresheet himself, rifling home in the second half. He scored his last goal of the season on 15 February as the Dons hosted Ibehre's former club Leyton Orient at Stadium mk, a result of 3–2 to Orient, which brought Ibehre's tally to five goals in 48 appearances. Although the majority of his appearances came from the substitutes bench, his performances proved good enough to convince manager Karl Robinson to hand Ibehre a two-year contract extension in June 2011.

==== 2011–12 season ====
Ibehre began the 2011–12 season in fine form. He scored in the first match of the season, brought on as a second-half substitute and scoring a 90th-minute equaliser in a 2–2 home draw with Hartlepool United on 6 August 2011. He then netted in the Dons 4–1 League Cup triumph over Cheltenham on 9 August with a shot from 12 yards, before opening the scoring in a 2–0 away win over Exeter on 13 August. He was sent off for a second booking late on in a 3–1 defeat to Sheffield Wednesday at Hillsborough on 10 September. He nabbed his fourth goal of the term on 29 October after Walsall goalkeeper Jimmy Walker was sent off in a 2–0 away victory for MK Dons. He scored the second goal of the match past stand-in goalkeeper Lee Beevers, whose usual positions are in defence and midfield. Ibehre scored the fifth and final goal for the Dons in a 5–1 rout against Colchester at the Colchester Community Stadium on 19 November, and then scored in the next match on 26 November in another high scoring encounter, a 4–3 salvo against Wycombe. He bagged his seventh goal of the season on 10 December, starting the scoring in a 2–0 away win at Tranmere, but a barren spell left him without a goal for four months, when he scored the final goal in a 3–0 home win on 10 March 2012 against Exeter from the substitutes bench. Ibehre concluded his goalscoring with his ninth of the season ten days later with another goal from the bench as the Dons cruised to a 4–1 victory against his former club Leyton Orient. His nine goals were gained after making 47 appearances across the year.

==== 2012–13 season ====
The 2012–13 season began in much the same way as his previous seasons with MK Dons; making appearances from the bench. His first game of the new season came as a substitute midway through the second half of a 2–0 win against Oldham at home on 18 August. After making just one start during the opening stages of the season, Ibehre was once again made available for loan.

==== Colchester United loan ====
Ibehre was recruited by Colchester United manager Joe Dunne on 27 September 2012, the same day that he was appointed first-team manager. Ibehre joined on a three-month loan deal, arriving alongside Arsenal duo Craig Eastmond and Sanchez Watt. The newly signed trio went straight into the first team for the match against Hartlepool United on 29 September, a game which Colchester won 3–1, with Ibehre netting himself a brace in the process. He scored his third goal in as many games for the club on 6 October, securing a leveller in an eventual 3–1 defeat to Yeovil Town. He scored the fourth goal of his loan spell on 20 October, converting a cross from fellow loanee Watt in a 2–0 win at home to Carlisle.

After scoring four goals in five league games, Ibehre claimed that extra shooting practice during training had helped him hit the goalscoring trail. Despite this, he then had a dry spell, and toward the end of his loan had failed to find the back of the net for two months, but remained unfazed by his lack of goals, saying his "main objective is to help us win". He ended his stay with the club after making 14 league appearances and one appearance in the FA Cup, and returned to his parent club before the turn of the year. He suffered an abdominal injury that kept him out of action for MK Dons, but said in spite of returning to fitness being his main priority, he would be open to a permanent return to Colchester. The club offered him a permanent contract in January 2013.

=== Colchester United ===
On the back of his successful loan stint with Colchester United, Ibehre signed a permanent contract with the club until the end of the 2012–13 season on 22 January 2013. Ibehre insisted that there was "no doubt in me coming back". He found his shooting boots on his second debut for the Essex club when he opened the scoring in a 2–0 win against his former employers Walsall on 26 January, a result that handed Colchester their first points for nine games. He scored both goals in a 2–0 win on the road at Stevenage on 2 March which helped move the club out of the relegation zone. Manager Joe Dunne heaped praise on Ibehre following the result, describing him as "a handful for everybody" and said that "when Jabo plays well, we generally play well". He was sent off for serious foul play in a 0–0 draw with Hartlepool on 5 March, ruling him out for three games through suspension. Ibehre, upset with the decision, claimed that he got the ball and hoped to have the red card rescinded. The club decided not to appeal, and Ibehre returned to action in late March. He scored his final goal of the season on 13 April, Colchester's only goal in a 3–1 defeat to Notts County. He made 16 appearances in addition to the 15 he had made for the club earlier in the season, as well as four goals to bring his tally to eight for the season. He was handed the Colchester United Player of the Year award after finishing the 2012–13 season as the club's joint-top scorer alongside Freddie Sears.

==== 2013–14 season ====
With his contract expiring in the summer of 2013, the club offered Player of the Year Ibehre a new deal ahead of the 2013–14 season. He agreed a new contract with Colchester on 17 June 2013, signing for a further two years. He scored his first goal of the new campaign on 6 August in a 5–1 home defeat to Peterborough United in the League Cup, levelling the scores at 1–1 just after half-time. He scored in another defeat on 31 August, this time to his former club Leyton Orient, grabbing Colchester's solitary goal in the 2–1 home loss. He netted his third league goal of the season to put the U's 2–1 up in a 2–2 draw with Bradford City on 14 September. He had to wait until 26 November for his next goal as he put the U's 2–0 ahead in a 3–1 win against MK Dons in Colchester's first win over the side since January 2010. His fifth of the season arrived in a 2–0 away victory against Oldham on 21 December, tapping in from a Dominic Vose lay-off. He then scored in the following game on Boxing Day, a 4–0 demolition of Stevenage at the Colchester Community Stadium with an acrobatic volley. He seventh goal of the season came as Colchester fell to a 2–1 loss at home to Preston North End on 22 February 2014, and his eighth proved to be the only goal of the game against Shrewsbury Town on 18 March with a low left-foot shot. He secured his ninth and final goal of the season on 12 April in a 3–2 win against Stevenage to help the U's move three points clear of the relegation zone. Ibehre had made 39 appearances throughout the season.

==== 2014–15 season ====
Ibehre had featured in all of Colchester's first six opening fixtures for the 2014–15 season up until 30 August 2014, a 3–1 home defeat to Peterborough United. He then suffered a knee injury that kept him out of action, yet to make an appearance under Tony Humes who had replaced Joe Dunne as manager at the beginning of September. It was then revealed that Ibehre had asked Humes to leave the club, declaring that his future lie elsewhere.

==== Oldham Athletic loan ====
Ibehre joined Oldham Athletic in a 93-day emergency loan deal on 9 October 2014. He made his Latics debut on 11 October as a second-half substitute as Oldham came from behind to beat Walsall 2–1, with Ibehre coming close to scoring on his debut. After two substitute appearances for Oldham, Ibehre made his first start for the club on 21 October. He also scored his first goal for the club in the same game with a close range header to round off the scoring in a 4–1 victory over Coventry City. Ibehre was sent-off in Oldham's 1–1 draw with Sheffield United on 22 November after collecting a second yellow card. Ibehre scored his second goal for Oldham in their 2–2 draw with Doncaster Rovers on 10 January on what was the final scheduled day of his loan from Colchester. He returned from his loan spell at Oldham with two goals to his name in twelve appearances, but his future at Colchester remained unclear, having made it apparent to Colchester manager Tony Humes that his future lie away from the U's and his contract expiring in the summer of 2015.

==== Barnsley loan ====
Still refusing to play under Humes at Colchester, Colchester's League One rivals Barnsley signed the want-away striker on loan until the end of the season on 6 March. It was the second time in the same season that Ibehre had been signed by Lee Johnson, who had signed him while managing Oldham. He made his debut as a late substitute for George Waring in Barnsley's 3–0 win over Walsall on 7 March. He scored his first goal for the club with an equalising goal in their 1–1 draw with Preston North End on 21 March. He then scored in his next game against league leaders Bristol City on 28 March with a 44th minute reply to Marlon Pack's 13th-minute penalty for City. He set up Josh Scowen to hand Barnsley the lead in the 53rd minute, with the match eventually finishing 2–2. He ended his loan spell with two goals in nine appearances for Barnsley.

Ibehre was released by Colchester United after the expiry of his contract with the club in May 2015.

=== Carlisle United ===
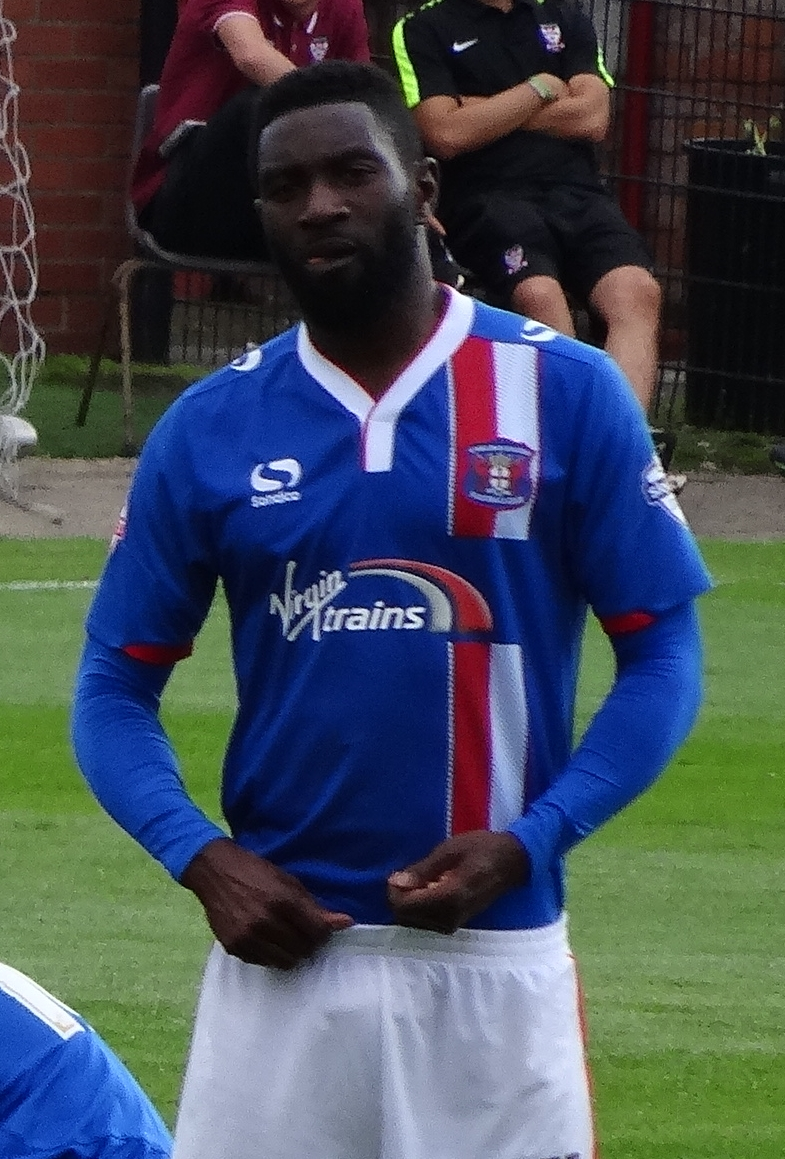
Ibehre playing for Carlisle United in 2015

On 25 June 2015 Ibehre agreed to a one-year deal with League Two club Carlisle United. On 8 August 2015, he marked his league debut by scoring in a 1–1 draw at Mansfield Town Three days later, he continued his good form by scoring a brace in a 3–1 extra-time win over Chesterfield in the first round of the League Cup, including the go ahead goal in the 108th minute...but also in this season and just only six-months after joining the League Two side Ibehre scored a personal best 17 goals for the season and getting his first match ball in a 4–4 draw with Cambridge United. He made the sport headlines when he was sent off after only 34 seconds in a league match against Accrington Stanley. This was later rescinded by the FA on appeal. In May 2017, the Club offered Ibehre a deal for the 2017–18 campaign.

=== Cambridge United ===
On 26 May 2017 Ibehre agreed to a one-year deal with League Two club Cambridge United.

Following the end of the 2018–19 season, he triggered a one-year contract extension.

In October 2019 he suffered a cut to the knee which became infected, and had to have an operation which ruled him out of play.

After being released in 2020, Ibhere announced his retirement from football in December 2020.

== Personal life ==
Ibehre was born in England and is of Nigerian descent.

== Career statistics ==
As of match played 6 May 2017

Appearances and goals by club, season and competition
Club	Season	League			FA Cup		League Cup		Other		Total	
Club	Season	Division	Apps	Goals	Apps	Goals	Apps	Goals	Apps	Goals	Apps	Goals
Leyton Orient	1999–2000	Third Division	3	0	0	0	0	0	0	0	3	0
Leyton Orient	2000–01	Third Division	5	2	0	0	1	0	3 (Note: Appearances in Third Division play-offs)	0	9	2
Leyton Orient	2001–02	Third Division	28	4	3	1	1	0	1 (Note: Appearance(s) in Football League Trophy)	0	33	5
Leyton Orient	2002–03	Third Division	25	5	1	0	1	1	1	0	28	6
Leyton Orient	2003–04	Third Division	35	4	2	0	1	1	1	0	39	5
Leyton Orient	2004–05	League Two	19	2	2	0	1	0	3	2	25	4
Leyton Orient	2005–06	League Two	33	8	4	0	0	0	1	0	38	8
Leyton Orient	2006–07	League One	30	4	3	0	1	0	1	0	35	4
Leyton Orient	2007–08	League One	31	7	1	0	0	0	1	0	33	7
Leyton Orient	Total		209	36	16	1	6	2	12	2	243	41
Walsall	2008–09	League One	39	10	1	0	1	0	2	1	43	11
Milton Keynes Dons	2009–10	League One	10	1	0	0	0	0	2	0	12	1
Milton Keynes Dons	2010–11	League One	42	3	0	0	3	2	3 (Note: One appearance in Football League Trophy, two in League One play-offs)	0	48	5
Milton Keynes Dons	2011–12	League One	39	8	3	0	3	1	2 (Note: Appearances in League One play-offs)	0	47	9
Milton Keynes Dons	2012–13	League One	3	0	0	0	1	0	1	0	5	0
Milton Keynes Dons	Total		94	12	3	0	7	3	8	0	112	15
Southend United (loan)	2009–10	League One	4	0	—		—		—		4	0
Stockport County (loan)	2009–10	League One	20	5	—		—		—		20	5
Colchester United	2012–13	League One	30	8	1	0	—		—		31	8
Colchester United	2013–14	League One	37	8	0	0	1	1	1	0	39	9
Colchester United	2014–15	League One	5	0	0	0	1	0	0	0	6	0
Colchester United	Total		72	16	1	0	2	1	1	0	76	17
Oldham Athletic (loan)	2014–15	League One	11	2	1	0	—		—		12	2
Barnsley (loan)	2014–15	League One	9	2	—		—		—		9	2
Carlisle United	2015–16	League Two	36	15	4	0	3	2	1	0	44	17
Carlisle United	2016–17	League Two	38	12	1	2	1	0	1 (Note: Appearance in EFL Trophy)	0	41	14
Carlisle United	Total		74	27	5	2	4	2	2	0	85	31
Career total			532	110	27	3	20	8	25	3	604	124

== Honours ==
Leyton Orient U19

- Football League Youth Alliance South East winner: 2000–01
- Football League Youth Alliance Cup winner: 2000–01

Individual

- Colchester United Player of the Year: 2012–13
