= Matt Lockwood =

English footballer (born 1976)

Personal information
- Full name: Matthew Dominic Lockwood
- Date of birth: 17 October 1976 (age 50)
- Place of birth: Southend-on-Sea, England
- Height: 5 ft 11 in (1.80 m)
- Position: Defender

Team information
- Current team: Montserrat (technical director)

Youth career
- 1993–1995: Southend United

Senior career*
Years	Team	Apps	(Gls)
1995–1996	Queens Park Rangers	0	(0)
1996–1998	Bristol Rovers	63	(1))
1998–2007	Leyton Orient	328	(50)
2007–2008	Nottingham Forest	11	(0)
2008–2010	Colchester United	6	(0)
2009	→ Barnet (loan)	12	(0)
2009	→ Dagenham & Redbridge (loan)	4	(0)
2010	→ Barnet (loan)	19	(2)
2010–2014	Dundee	107	(9)
2014	Sutton United	9	(0)
Total		559	(62)

Managerial career
- 2023: Montserrat
- * Club domestic league appearances and goals

Matthew Dominic Lockwood (born 17 October 1976) is an English former footballer and the technical director of the Montserrat national football team. During his career, he played for clubs such as Leyton Orient, Nottingham Forest, and Dundee, among others. Lockwood was known for his ability to attack from left-back and for his goal-scoring abilities.

== Career ==
=== Early career ===
Born in Southend-on-Sea, Essex, Lockwood was a trainee with his hometown club, Southend United, before signing a professional contract with Queens Park Rangers on 2 May 1995. Lockwood was part of the successful QPR reserve team that won the Avon Combination league in the 1995–96 season. When his teammate, Ian Holloway, was appointed player-manager at Bristol Rovers, Lockwood became one of his first signings. He went on to make 76 appearances for the club until the end of the 1997–98 season.

=== Leyton Orient ===
After completing his contract with Bristol Rovers, Lockwood moved on a free transfer to Leyton Orient, where he became an integral part of the first team. He was named in the PFA Team of the Year for both the 1999–00 and 2000–01 seasons. His performances attracted the attention of several Premier League clubs, but Leyton Orient did not accept any offers for him.

Later, when Lockwood attracted the attention of Championship clubs, including Millwall, West Bromwich Albion, and Crystal Palace, Leyton Orient offered him an improved two-year deal, which he signed at the end of the season.

In 2006, Lockwood was ranked the 47th best player outside the Premier League in a study by FourFourTwo magazine. The study named him the best left-back and the fourth-best player in League Two.

Lockwood was named Orient's Player of the Season for both the 2005–06 and 2006–07 seasons.

Lockwood was Leyton Orient's second-highest goal-scorer in the 2006–07 season, including an 11-minute hat-trick in a game against Gillingham. He scored 11 goals from left-back that season and was named in the PFA League One Team of the Year for 2006–07.

==== Spleen injury ====
During the 2001–02 season, Lockwood suffered a significant spleen injury during a match against York City in August 2001 after colliding with an opposing player. His injury was initially life-threatening as his condition quickly deteriorated, and it took several months to recover. He made his return in a match against Crystal Palace reserves, stating: "It was great to be back, and the management felt I did well and are pleased with my progress ... The injury does not play on my mind, and I am just trying to forget it now."

=== Nottingham Forest ===
In July 2007, Lockwood signed for League One giants Nottingham Forest for an undisclosed fee, agreeing to a two-year contract. Orient manager Martin Ling said, "He's been very close to signing for top-flight teams in the past, and I think he felt at this stage of his career it was too good an opportunity to turn down." Lockwood made his debut on the opening day of the season in a 0–0 draw at home to Bournemouth, but an ankle injury sidelined him for the first three months of the season.

In the 2007–08 campaign, Lockwood made 11 appearances and helped Nottingham Forest secure automatic promotion by finishing second in the league, earning promotion from League One to the Championship. At the end of the season, Colchester United, recently relegated from the Championship, had a £100,000 bid for Lockwood accepted. Forest were reluctant to let him go, they agreed to the sale due to Lockwood's desire for guaranteed first-team football.

=== Colchester United ===
Lockwood signed for Colchester United in June 2008 for an undisclosed fee. In the opening game of the season, he made his debut in a 4–2 loss against Hartlepool United. He made only three appearances in the first half of the season due to an injury he suffered in August, which sidelined him for three months. During this time, Colchester changed managers, and once Lockwood regained fitness, he found his first-team opportunities limited as the new manager signed another left-back without having seen Lockwood play. By January, Lockwood had recovered from his knee injury and returned to training. Towards the end of the season, he made two more appearances.

Colchester announced that his contract would not be renewed when it expired at the end of the following season. Before his release, Lockwood stated that he couldn't wait to leave the club. After departing, he was linked with a return to Colchester under new manager John Ward, but he refused, describing his time there as a "nightmare."

=== Loan moves ===
Lockwood joined Barnet on loan in February 2009. After the move, he explained that he decided to join Barnet to build up his match fitness after three months out injured. During his stay, the club picked up eight points from a possible 15, helping to move them away from the immediate danger of relegation.

On 30 October 2009, he signed a one-month loan deal with Dagenham & Redbridge. He made his debut against Port Vale and completed his loan on 30 November 2009.

In January 2010, Lockwood rejoined Barnet on loan for another month and scored his first goal for the club against Morecambe on 23 January 2010. The loan period was then extended until the end of the season.

=== Dundee ===
On 20 August 2010, Lockwood signed a one-year deal with Dundee. He made his debut in a 0–0 draw against Ross County.

On 2 October 2010, Lockwood scored his first goal for the club from the penalty spot and set up the winning goal in a 2–1 victory against Morton.

At the end of October 2010, following the club entering administration and making numerous redundancies, including nine first-team players, the manager, and the assistant manager, Lockwood was appointed player/assistant manager of Dundee. This was due to his desire to move into management and his completion of the A License coaching qualification. Lockwood spoke out about the club's administration, stating that the team was determined to stay up against all odds, despite being deducted 25 points in the league.

During the club's time in administration, Lockwood helped Dundee achieve a remarkable 23-match unbeaten run, breaking the previous club record set by the league-winning team of the 1960s. These incredible results, with just 11 first-team players, helped Dundee avoid relegation. The club also exited administration at the end of the season. In his first season, Lockwood made 34 appearances, scored five goals, and was voted the club's Player of the Year.

The following season, Lockwood scored in the opening game against Partick Thistle, helping Dundee secure a 1–0 victory. At the end of the season, he signed a new contract with the club. Shortly after, he revealed that settling in Scotland had influenced his decision to stay at Dundee.

Dundee finished second in the 2011–12 season but were promoted to the Scottish Premier League to replace Rangers after they went into liquidation, and the new club, The Rangers, was placed in Division Three. Lockwood made his SPL debut in a 0–0 draw against Kilmarnock on the opening day of the season. Three months later, he scored his first goal of the season with a trademark free kick that flew into the top corner, securing a 1–0 win for Dundee against Heart of Midlothian.

Following Dundee's relegation, Lockwood signed a new one-year deal, having impressed new manager John Brown by playing at left-back, centre-back, and as a sweeper towards the end of the previous season. Lockwood continued to play as a sweeper and centre-half at the start of the 2013–14 season but returned to his more familiar left-back role a couple of months into the season. Dundee then went on a strong run of form, leading the table at the start of December 2013. His performances were praised by Brown, who said, "Matt has been great for us since I've been here. You can see why he's played at a higher level; he's comfortable at full-back and in the middle of the defence. As well as his own game, he's a very good talker and organiser and keeps the younger players right during games." Lockwood was affectionately referred to as "Dens Park's Ryan Giggs" by Dundee fans.

As the season progressed, manager John Brown was fired. Lockwood applied for the vacant manager's position, but Paul Hartley was hired instead. At the end of the season, Lockwood was released by the club. After his release, Lockwood expressed interest in becoming the manager of Greenock Morton, who had been relegated from the Scottish Championship. His release was officially confirmed on 10 June 2014.

Upon leaving the club, Lockwood revealed that no one from Dundee had contacted him to inform him he wasn't being offered a new deal. He found out about his release from a Dundee fan who saw it on the club's website. Lockwood said his four years at Dundee had been eventful and that he had enjoyed his time at the club, but he was disappointed with how he was treated. Many in Dundee were surprised by his release, as a player of Lockwood's quality is not easily replaced. Both on and off the pitch, he was well respected by everyone involved in football.

=== Sutton United ===
Lockwood signed for Sutton United as a player-coach in 2014.

== Career statistics ==
Appearances and goals by club, season and competition
Club	Season	League			FA Cup		League Cup		Other		Total	
Club	Season	Division	Apps	Goals	Apps	Goals	Apps	Goals	Apps	Goals	Apps	Goals
QPR	1995–96	Premier League	0	0	0	0	0	0	0	0	0	0
Bristol Rovers	1996–97	Second Division	39	1	0	0	2	0	0	0	41	1
Bristol Rovers	1997–98	Second Division	24	0	5	0	1	0	5 (Note: Appearance(s) in Football League Trophy) (Note: Appearance(s) in Division Two play-offs)	0	35	0
Bristol Rovers	Total		63	1	5	0	3	0	5	0	76	1
Leyton Orient	1998–99	Third Division	37	3	4	0	2	0	3 (Note: Appearance(s) in Division Three play-offs)	0	46	3
Leyton Orient	1999–2000	Third Division	41	6	2	0	4	1	0	0	47	7
Leyton Orient	2000–01	Third Division	32	7	4	0	4	0	4	1	44	8
Leyton Orient	2001–02	Third Division	24	2	1	0	1	0	0	0	26	2
Leyton Orient	2002–03	Third Division	43	5	2	0	1	0	2	1	48	6
Leyton Orient	2003–04	Third Division	25	2	2	1	1	0	1	1	29	4
Leyton Orient	2004–05	League Two	43	6	2	1	1	0	4	0	50	7
Leyton Orient	2005–06	League Two	42	8	5	0	0	0	0	0	47	8
Leyton Orient	2006–07	League One	41	11	3	0	1	0	1	0	46	11
Leyton Orient	Total		328	50	25	2	15	1	15	3	383	56
Nottingham Forest	2007–08	League One	11	0	1	0	0	0	0	0	12	0
Colchester United	2008–09	League One	5	0	0	0	0	0	0	0	5	0
Colchester United	2009–10	League One	1	0	0	0	0	0	1	0	2	0
Colchester United	Total		6	0	0	0	0	0	1	0	7	0
Barnet (loan)	2008–09	League Two	12	0	0	0	0	0	0	0	12	0
Dagenham & Redbridge (loan)	2009–10	League Two	4	0	0	0	0	0	0	0	4	0
Barnet (loan)	2009–10	League Two	19	2	0	0	0	0	0	0	19	2
Dundee	2010–11	Scottish First Division	33	5	1	0	1	0	0	0	35	5
Dundee	2011–12	Scottish First Division	34	3	2	0	2	1	1 (Note: Appearance(s) in Scottish Challenge Cup)	0	39	4
Dundee	2012–13	Scottish Premier League	23	1	1	0	2	0	0	0	26	1
Dundee	2013–14	Scottish Championship	17	0	1	0	1	0	0	0	19	0
Dundee	Total		107	9	5	0	6	1	1	0	119	10
Sutton United	2014–15	Conference South	9	0	0	0	0	0	0	0	9	0
Career total			559	62	36	2	24	2	22	3	641	69

== Coaching career ==
In 2023, Lockwood was appointed head coach and technical director of the Montserrat national football team. He managed only two games in March 2023 before being replaced by Lee Bowyer for the team's September fixtures, while continuing in his role as technical director.

== Managerial record ==
As of Match played 28 March 2023

Team	From	To	Record				
Team	From	To	G	W	D	L	Win %
Montserrat	2023	2023	2	0	1	1	0.00

== Honours ==
Nottingham Forest

- Football League One second-place promotion: 2007–08

Dundee

- Scottish Championship: 2013–14

Individual

- PFA Team of the Year: 1999–2000 Third Division, 2000–01 Third Division, 2005–06 League Two, 2006–07 League One
- PFA Scotland Team of the Year: 2010–11
- Leyton Orient Player of the Year: 2005–06, 2006–07
- Leyton Orient Hall of Fame
