= John Hills (footballer) =

English footballer and manager (born 1978)

Personal information
- Full name: John David Hills
- Date of birth: 21 April 1978 (age 48)
- Place of birth: Blackpool, England
- Position: Defender

Team information
- Current team: Bamber Bridge (assistant manager)

Senior career*
Years	Team	Apps	(Gls)
1994–1995	Blackpool	0	(0)
1995–1998	Everton	3	(0)
1997	→ Swansea City (loan)	11	(0)
1997	→ Swansea City (loan)	7	(1)
1998	→ Blackpool (loan)	6	(0)
1998–2003	Blackpool	157	(26)
2003–2005	Gillingham	52	(2)
2005–2007	Sheffield Wednesday	45	(0)
2007–2008	Blackpool	4	(0)
2008–2010	Fleetwood Town	44	(0)
2010–2011	AFC Fylde	28	(12)
Total		357	(41)
- * Club domestic league appearances and goals

John David Hills (born 21 April 1978) is an English former footballer. He is assistant manager of Bamber Bridge.

== Playing career ==
=== Early career – From Blackpool to Everton and back to Blackpool ===
Hills started in the youth team at hometown club Blackpool. He was signed by Everton manager Joe Royle for £90,000 as a schoolboy from Blackpool in 1995, after he impressed in an FA Youth Cup match playing for the Blackpool youth team against their Everton counterparts.

His only full appearance for the Toffees was at home to Chelsea on 11 May 1997. He had two loan spells at Swansea City, making eighteen appearances and scoring once, before returning to his hometown club for £60,000 in 1998, after an initial loan spell. In the 2000–01 season he was an integral part of the promotion team, playing 90 minutes as Blackpool defeated Leyton Orient 4–2 in the Third Division play-off final. He signed a one-year contract extension in April 2001. In the 2001–02 season he scored the Seasiders' third goal as they beat Cambridge United 4–1 at the Millennium Stadium, Cardiff to win the Football League Trophy.

Hills made almost two hundred appearances over five years, scoring twenty goals and he also held the captain's armband in the absence of Ian Hughes.

=== Gillingham and Sheffield Wednesday ===
Hills left Blackpool for Gillingham, who were then in the Championship in 2003 and appeared fifty-eight times over two years, scoring two goals. After his contract was not renewed, Paul Sturrock signed him for Sheffield Wednesday, for whom he sometimes played on the left-wing. His time with the Owls was blighted by injury, which only allowed him to appear forty-six times, and was released by the club after two years.

=== Back to Blackpool again ===
On 5 July 2007, Hills signed a one-year contract (with an option for a further year) with Blackpool, his third spell with his hometown club. On 7 May 2008 he was released by Blackpool after making only four league appearances.

=== Fleetwood Town ===
An operation in the summer meant he was not fully fit and without a club. On the eve of the 2008–09 season, Hills signed for local Fylde coast club Fleetwood Town who had been promoted to the Conference North, on a non-contract basis. On 25 October 2008 he played in Fleetwood's FA Cup fourth qualifying round 4–3 win over Nantwich Town which saw the club reach the First round proper. At the end of the 2009–2010 season he was released by the club.

=== AFC Fylde ===
Following his release from Fleetwood Hills signed for his third Fylde team AFC Fylde as player and first team coach ready for the 2010–11 season. He played and coached the team for one season before returning to Blackpool to become Head of Youth.

=== Bamber Bridge ===
Hills was named assistant manager to Jamie Milligan at Bamber Bridge in December 2019.

== Personal life ==
In 2008 Hills invested in a public house in Blackpool, becoming the landlord of The Welcome pub, in Marton. He has also helped coach youngsters on the Fylde coast with two fellow local players, who were also with Hills at Everton Jamie Milligan, now at Southport, and Gavin McCann. In February 2008, Milligan and McCann launched the first football academy on the Fylde coast, the Milligan-McCann Academy which is aimed at 8- to 12-year-olds and runs at King Edward VII and Queen Mary School in Lytham St Annes. Hills also coaches. John is married to Samantha and they have two children Isla and Rocco.

== Coaching career ==
Hills retired professionally from an ankle injury in 2008 and went straight in to coaching at Fleetwood Town. Hills also set up Fleetwood Towns first ever youth team with manager Micky Mellon.

In 2010 Hills was employed by AFC Fylde as both player and first team coach which he performed for one season before getting the job of Head of Youth at Blackpool.

In 2011, Hills returned to his first club Blackpool as a coach in their Centre of Excellence. In August of that year, he was made Head of Youth, replacing Jamie Shore who has been brought in to replace the sick Gary Parkinson.

In 2013 Hills worked for Templegate Training coaching and educating underprivileged youngsters in Blackpool helping them gain relevant qualifications to gain employment. In 2014 Hills was promoted to regional manager.

On 15 May 2013, Hills was appointed as assistant to Alan Wright at Southport.

On 13 November 2014, Hills became First-team coach at Hyde, but left on 2 January 2015.

In October 2019, Hills became caretaker manager of AFC Fylde, leading them to a 6–1 victory over Peterborough Sports in the FA Cup and a 2–0 league win over Boreham Wood in the National League.

== Honours ==
Blackpool

- Football League Third Division play-offs: 2001
- Football League Trophy: 2001–02
- Lancashire Cup: 1994–95

Individual

- Blackpool Player of the Season: 2001–02, 2002–03
