= Darren Connell =

Darren Connell may refer to:

- Darren Connell (footballer)
- Darren Connell (comedian)
