= Wim Walschaerts =

Belgian footballer

Personal information
- Full name: Wim Walschaerts
- Date of birth: 5 November 1972 (age 53)
- Place of birth: Antwerp, Belgium
- Height: 5 ft 11 in (1.80 m)
- Position: Midfielder

Youth career
- 1990–1995: K. Beerschot V.A.C.

Senior career*
Years	Team	Apps	(Gls)
1995–1996	K. Beerschot V.A.C.		
1996–1998	KFC Tielen		
1998–2001	Leyton Orient	125	(9)
2001–2002	KFC Strombeek		
2002–2003	K. Berchem Sport		
2003–2005	K.V. Red Star Waasland		
2005–2006	RC Lebbeke		
2006–2008	K. Berchem Sport		
2008–2009	KFCO Wilrijk		
?	Ternesse VV Wommelgem		
- * Club domestic league appearances and goals

Wim Walschaerts (born 5 November 1972 in Antwerp) is a Belgian former professional footballer who played as a midfielder, mainly in Belgium but also in England for Leyton Orient. He could also play as a right-sided wing-back.

== Career ==
Walschaerts began his career in the youth ranks at K. Beerschot V.A.C. in the early 1990s before moving to Second Division club KFC Tielen in June 1996. When Tielen withdrew from the league due to financial problems, Walschaerts was signed by Leyton Orient manager Tommy Taylor under the Bosman ruling.

Whilst at Orient, Walschaerts was a first-team regular and scored some important goals, including FA Cup goals against Brighton & Hove Albion and Kingstonian. He also won two fans' Player of the Year Awards in 1998–99. He missed all of Orient's three matches in the 1999 play-off campaign due to suspension, but played in the 2001 Football League Third Division play-off final, which Orient lost 4–2 to Blackpool. He was the subject of interest from Luton Town, but remained committed to Orient until June 2001, when he signed for KFC Strombeek, again under the Bosman ruling.

Walschaerts spent the rest of his career in his home country, playing with a number of Belgian sides before retiring in 2010.
