= 2011–12 Scottish Football League =

Irn-Bru Football League
- Season: 2011–12

Statistics of the Scottish Football League in season 2011–12.

After the season ended, Rangers were liquidated, and re-formed in the Third Division. This meant that three further promotion places were created: these went to Dundee, Airdrie United and Stranraer. Airdrie United and Stranraer earned promotion as the losers in the playoff finals.

== Scottish First Division ==
Pos	Team	Pld	W	D	L	GF	GA	GD	Pts	Promotion, qualification or relegation
1	Ross County (C, P)	36	22	13	1	72	32	+40	79	Promotion to the Premier League
2	Dundee (P)	36	15	10	11	53	43	+10	55 (Note: Rangers were liquidated prior to the 2012–13 season. Dundee were chosen to take their place, gaining promotion to the SPL.)	Promotion to the Premier League
3	Falkirk	36	13	13	10	53	48	+5	52	
4	Hamilton Academical	36	14	7	15	55	56	−1	49	
5	Livingston	36	13	9	14	56	54	+2	48	
6	Partick Thistle	36	12	11	13	50	39	+11	47	
7	Raith Rovers	36	11	11	14	46	49	−3	44	
8	Greenock Morton	36	10	12	14	40	55	−15	42	
9	Ayr United (R)	36	9	11	16	44	67	−23	38	Qualification for the First Division play-offs
10	Queen of the South (R)	36	7	11	18	38	64	−26	32	Relegation to the Second Division

Source: SPFL Archive
Rules for classification: 1) points; 2) goal difference; 3) number of goals scored.
(C) Champions; (P) Promoted; (R) Relegated

== Scottish Second Division ==
Pos	Team	Pld	W	D	L	GF	GA	GD	Pts	Promotion, qualification or relegation
1	Cowdenbeath (C, P)	36	20	11	5	68	29	+39	71	Promotion to the First Division
2	Arbroath	36	17	12	7	76	51	+25	63	Qualification for the First Division play-offs
3	Dumbarton (O, P)	36	17	7	12	61	61	0	58 (Note: Dumbarton won the First Division play-off final, and were promoted to the First Division.)	Qualification for the First Division play-offs
4	Airdrie United (P)	36	14	10	12	68	60	+8	52 (Note: Airdrie United lost the final of the First Division playoffs to Dumbarton. However following the demotion of Rangers to the third division prior to the beginning of the 2012-13 season, Dundee were promoted from the First Division to the SPL, and Airdrie United were promoted to the First Division to take their place. Stranraer were promoted from the Third to the Second Division to take the place of Airdrie United)	Qualification for the First Division play-offs
5	Stenhousemuir	36	15	6	15	54	49	+5	51	
6	East Fife	36	14	6	16	55	57	−2	48	
7	Forfar Athletic	36	11	9	16	59	72	−13	42	
8	Brechin City	36	10	11	15	47	62	−15	41	
9	Albion Rovers (O)	36	10	7	19	43	66	−23	37	Qualification for Second Division play-offs
10	Stirling Albion (R)	36	9	7	20	46	70	−24	34	Relegation to the Third Division

Source: SPFL Archive
Rules for classification: 1) points; 2) goal difference; 3) number of goals scored.
(C) Champions; (O) Play-off winners; (P) Promoted; (R) Relegated

== Scottish Third Division ==
Pos	Team	Pld	W	D	L	GF	GA	GD	Pts	Promotion or qualification
1	Alloa Athletic (C, P)	36	23	8	5	70	39	+31	77	Promotion to the Second Division
2	Queen's Park	36	19	6	11	70	48	+22	63	Qualification for the Second Division Play-offs
3	Stranraer (P)	36	17	7	12	77	57	+20	58 (Note: Stranraer advanced to the final of the Second Division play-offs but were defeated by Albion Rovers, who retained their place in the Second Division. However, following the demotion of Rangers to the Third Division, Dundee were promoted from the First Division to the SPL, Airdrie United promoted from the Second to the First Division, and Stranraer were promoted from the Third to the Second Division.)	Qualification for the Second Division Play-offs
4	Elgin City	36	16	9	11	68	60	+8	57	Qualification for the Second Division Play-offs
5	Peterhead	36	15	6	15	51	53	−2	51	
6	Annan Athletic	36	13	10	13	53	53	0	49	
7	Berwick Rangers	36	12	12	12	61	58	+3	48	
8	Montrose	36	11	5	20	58	75	−17	38	
9	Clyde	36	8	11	17	35	50	−15	35	
10	East Stirlingshire	36	6	6	24	38	88	−50	24	

Source: SPFL Archive
Rules for classification: 1) points; 2) goal difference; 3) number of goals scored.
(C) Champions; (P) Promoted

== See also ==
- 2011–12 in Scottish football
