= Jamie Milligan =

English footballer (born 1980)

Personal information
- Date of birth: 3 January 1980 (age 46)
- Place of birth: Blackpool, England
- Height: 1.70 m (5 ft 7 in)
- Position: Midfielder

Senior career*
Years	Team	Apps	(Gls)
1996–2001	Everton	4	(0)
2001–2003	Blackpool	75	(1)
2003–2005	Hyde United	69	(15)
2004	→ Fleetwood Town (loan)	10	(6)
2005–2013	Fleetwood Town	240	(42)
2013	Hyde	12	(2)
2013–2014	Southport	26	(3)
2014–2015	Stockport County	32	(3)
2015	Harrogate Town	3	(0)
2018–2019	FC United of Manchester	1	(0)
2019	AFC Blackpool		

International career
1998–1999	England U18	23	(9)

Managerial career
- 2019–2026: Bamber Bridge
- * Club domestic league appearances and goals

Jamie Milligan (born 3 January 1980) is an English former professional footballer who played as a midfielder. He was last manager of Bamber Bridge.

== Playing career ==
Milligan started his career in 1997 as a trainee at Everton. He never started a match, but had four league appearances as a substitute before he left on 21 March 2001 for Blackpool. At Blackpool he stayed until August 2003, scoring one goal against Stockport in 29 league games and once in the Football League Trophy against Scunthorpe. He fractured a foot in training in November 2002, an injury which kept him out for five months. Steve McMahon, the then Blackpool manager, released him at the end of the 2002–03 season.

On 5 August 2003, Milligan signed for Macclesfield Town, but he moved only a month later to Leigh RMI. He then played for Hyde United, who loaned him to Fleetwood in August 2004 after he had recovered from an injury to a cruciate ligament of the knee. Toward the end of the 2004–05 season Milligan made eight appearances for Blackpool's reserve team, hoping to move there. However, in May 2005 Blackpool manager Colin Hendry declined to offer him a contract.

Milligan moved to Fleetwood Town in 2006 and was their club captain. He was their leading scorer in the 2007–08 season with 21 goals. The club won promotion to the Conference North as champions of the Northern Premier League Premier Division, and Milligan was named both the fans' Player of the Season and the players' Player of the Season. On 23 May 2008, he signed a new three-year contract at the club. In 2008, he was voted as the Premier Division Player of the Year and was presented with the Peter Swales Memorial Trophy after Fleetwood's match against Bradford Park Avenue F.C.

On 25 June 2013, Milligan signed for Southport. Milligan's time at Southport wasn't too long, he joined Stockport towards the end of the 2013–14 season playing in most of the club's games. He was made captain by Stockport after Phil Jevons' retirement. On 16 August 2014 he scored his first goal for Stockport against Tamworth, a 90th-minute penalty to send Stockport home as 1–0 winners. He joined Harrogate Town later in the 2014–15 season.

In 2018, Milligan joined FC United of Manchester, making his début for the club as a late substitute in a 2–1 defeat to AFC Telford United on 17 November. He was assistant manager at the club. but left in January 2019 as the manager wished to free up budget for the players budget for the remainder of the season.

== Coaching career ==
In February 2008 Milligan teamed up with Gavin McCann, then a Premiership player, to launch the first football academy on the Fylde coast. The Milligan-McCann Academy is aimed at 8- to 12-year-olds and runs at King Edward VII and Queen Mary School in Lytham St Annes. Former Blackpool player John Hills coaches at the academy. In October 2008 the academy received major sponsorship from Northern Care to continue coaching sessions at King Edward VII and Queen Mary School each weekend and to run week-long summer courses. The academy has also received a grant to encourage children to play park football. Milligan was also a coach at Blackpool's Centre of Excellence, where he coached the under-14 team.

Milligan was appointed as manager of Bamber Bridge in December 2019.

As of October 2021, Milligan also runs a football academy with Trevor Sinclair.

== Personal life ==
He married on 13 August 2016.

== Honours ==
Blackpool

- Football League Third Division play-offs: 2001
