= Phil Clarkson =

English footballer and coach

Personal information
- Full name: Philip Ian Clarkson
- Date of birth: 13 November 1968 (age 57)
- Place of birth: Hambleton, Lancashire, England
- Position: Midfielder

Senior career*
Years	Team	Apps	(Gls)
1990–1991	Fleetwood Town		
1991–1996	Crewe Alexandra	98	(27)
1995	→ Scunthorpe United (loan)	4	(1)
1996–1997	Scunthorpe United	48	(18)
1997–2002	Blackpool	171	(35)
2002	→ Bury (loan)	4	(0)
2002–2003	Halifax Town	38	(4)
2003–2004	Lancaster City		
Total		363	(85)
- * Club domestic league appearances and goals

Philip Ian Clarkson (born 13 November 1968) is an English former professional footballer.

== Playing career ==
After a short trial with Norwich City in February 1990, Clarkson began his career in non-league football with Northern Premier League club Fleetwood Town, with whom he spent one year. He began his professional career with Dario Gradi's Crewe Alexandra in the Third Division whom he signed for on 15 October 1991 for a transfer fee of £22,500. He remained at Gresty Road for five years, clocking up almost a century of league appearances, and helped the club win promotion in the 1993–94 season.

On 13 February 1996 he joined Scunthorpe United, where he had spent a short time on loan the previous season. He was the club's top scorer in the 1996–97 season.

On 4 February 1997, he was signed by Nigel Worthington for a fee of £80,000, at Blackpool. He scored his first goal for the club in the sixteenth minute of the West Lancashire derby against Preston North End at Bloomfield Road on 15 March 1997, before going on to score the winner in the 2–1 victory just after the hour mark.

He was the club's top scorer the following season. He remained at Bloomfield Road for five years, winning promotion with the Tangerines under Steve McMahon in the 2000–01 Division Three play-offs. In 2002, he spent a short time on loan at Bury before being released by Blackpool at the end of the 2001–02 season having scored 35 goals in 171 league games for the Seasiders.

Clarkson joined Halifax Town in August 2002. He then joined Lancaster City in the summer of 2003 while working as a postman in Poulton-le-Fylde and finished his career with them, retiring on 10 March 2004.

== Blackpool F.C. Hall of Fame ==
Clarkson was inducted into the Hall of Fame at Bloomfield Road, when it was officially opened by former Blackpool player Jimmy Armfield in April 2006. Organised by the Blackpool Supporters Association, Blackpool fans around the world voted on their all-time heroes. Five players from each decade are inducted; Clarkson is in the 1990s.

== Coaching career ==
Clarkson studied for his UEFA B coaching licence. He is currently the coach of the Under-16 team at his hometown club Blackpool's Centre of Excellence.

== Masters Football ==
It has been announced that Clarkson will represent Blackpool in the 2010 Masters Football competition.

== Honours ==
Blackpool

- Football League Third Division play-offs: 2001
