= John Martin (English footballer) =

English footballer

Personal information
- Full name: John Martin
- Date of birth: 15 July 1981 (age 45)
- Place of birth: Bethnal Green, England
- Height: 5 ft 6 in (1.68 m)
- Position: Midfielder

Youth career
- ?–1998: Leyton Orient

Senior career*
Years	Team	Apps	(Gls)
1998–2003	Leyton Orient	93	(5)
2003–2004	Farnborough Town	3	(0)
2004	Hornchurch	5	(0)
2004–2007	Grays Athletic	93	(14)
2007–2009	Stevenage Borough	44	(2)
2009	→ Ebbsfleet United (loan)	7	(0)
2009–2011	Chelmsford City	67	(3)
2012	Harlow Town	3	(0)
Total		315	(24)
- * Club domestic league appearances and goals as of 16:54, 24 February 2012 (UTC)

John Martin (born 15 July 1981 in Bethnal Green, London) is an English footballer who was last attached to Isthmian League Division One North club Harlow Town.

== Career ==
Martin began his career with Leyton Orient, making over 90 Football League appearances, before dropping into non-League football with Farnborough Town, Hornchurch, Grays Athletic and Stevenage Borough.

During the 2007–08 season, Martin enjoyed a successful first season featuring in the centre of midfield for Stevenage Borough. However, the arrival of new manager Graham Westley saw Martin fall out of favour and his first-team chances were limited. In February 2009, he was loaned out to Ebbsfleet United. Martin was recalled by manager Westley on 7 April 2009, playing a vital role in the two wins against Cambridge United and Ebbsfleet United. The latter was to be his last performance for Stevenage and on 20 May 2009, Martin was released by Stevenage Borough. On 7 August, it was announced that Martin had joined Essex based Conference South outfit Chelmsford City. Martin's stay lasted two seasons, as he was released by the club in May 2011.

He went on to join Isthmian League Division One North club Harlow Town in January 2012, making his début in the 1–0 away win over Maldon & Tiptree on 21 January. However, Martin left Harlow after playing three games for them up to 18 February.

== Honours ==
- FA Trophy: 2005, 2006
- Conference South (VI): 2005
