= Phil Thompson (footballer, born 1981) =

English football defender

Personal information
- Full name: Phil Paul Thompson
- Date of birth: 1 April 1981 (age 45)
- Place of birth: Blackpool, England
- Position: Defender

Senior career*
Years	Team	Apps	(Gls)
1998–2002	Blackpool	47	(3)
2002	Squires Gate		
- * Club domestic league appearances and goals

Phil Paul Thompson (born 1 April 1981) is an English former footballer who played in the Football League for Blackpool.

== Honours ==
Blackpool

- Football League Third Division play-offs: 2001
