= Wayne Gill =

English footballer and physiotherapist

Personal information
- Full name: Wayne John Gill
- Date of birth: 28 November 1975 (age 50)
- Place of birth: Chorley, England
- Height: 5 ft 10 in (1.78 m)
- Position: Midfielder

Team information
- Current team: Blackburn Rovers (Head of Physiotherapy)

Senior career*
Years	Team	Apps	(Gls)
1994–2000	Blackburn Rovers	4	(0)
1998	→ Dundee United (loan)	4	(0)
2000	→ Blackpool (loan)	12	(7)
2000–2001	Tranmere Rovers	26	(2)
2001–2003	Oldham Athletic	13	(2)
2003–2004	Scarborough	35	(1)
2004–2005	Droylsden		
- * Club domestic league appearances and goals

Wayne John Gill (born 28 November 1975) is an English former footballer and current head of physiotherapy for Blackburn Rovers.

== Career ==
Gill began his career with Blackburn Rovers making 3 first team appearances and was included in the 1995 Champions League Squad before spending time on loan at Dundee United and Blackpool. He had marked success at Blackpool scoring seven goals in 12 games but was unable to save the Seasiders from relegation. A move to Tranmere Rovers in July 2000 saw Gill make 16 appearances but the following season he moved to Oldham, where he would spend the next two years. In 2003-04, he moved to Scarborough, before a final playing spell with Droylsden. Gill retired from football aged 28, mainly due to an ongoing ankle injury

He is a graduate from the University of Salford with a first class honours Physiotherapy degree, which he completed in 2008. In 2016, he completed a master's degree in Sports Physiotherapy from Bath University. He is currently working as a physiotherapist at Brentford Football Club. In September 2026, he joined Blackburn Rovers as Head of Physiotherapy.
