= 2006–07 Leyton Orient F.C. season =

Leyton Orient
2006–07 season
- Manager: Martin Ling
- Stadium: Brisbane Road
- League One: 20th
- FA Cup: Second round (eliminated by Torquay United)
- League Cup: First round (eliminated by West Bromwich Albion)
- FL Trophy: Second round (eliminated by Bristol City)

The 2006–07 season was Leyton Orient's 108th season and their 91st in the Football League. It was their first season back in the third tier of the English football league system, Football League One, following promotion in the 2005–06 season. Orient avoided relegation from League One, finishing 20th, and also took part in the FA Cup, League Cup, Football League Trophy, but were eliminated in the first round of the FA Cup and Football League Trophy, and the first round of the League Cup.

== Competitions ==
=== League One ===
==== Table ====
Pos	Team	Pld	W	D	L	GF	GA	GD	Pts	Promotion, qualification or relegation
18	Brighton & Hove Albion	46	14	11	21	49	58	−9	53	
19	Bournemouth	46	13	13	20	50	64	−14	52	
20	Leyton Orient	46	12	15	19	61	77	−16	51	
21	Chesterfield (R)	46	12	11	23	45	53	−8	47	Relegation to Football League Two
22	Bradford City (R)	46	11	14	21	47	65	−18	47	Relegation to Football League Two

Rules for classification: In the Football League goals scored (GF) takes precedence over goal difference (GD).
(R) Relegated

==== Results ====
League One match details
Date	Opponents	Venue	Result	Score F–A	Scorers	Attendance	Ref.
5 August 2006	Port Vale	A	L	0–3		5,631	
8 August 2006	Millwall	H	W	2–0	Steele 45', Alexander 78'	6,142	
12 August 2006	AFC Bournemouth	H	W	3–2	Alexander 28', Steele 67', 90'	4,474	
19 August 2006	Carlisle United	A	L	1–3	Steele 68'	7,160	
26 August 2006	Swansea City	H	L	0–1		4,162	
2 September 2006	Tranmere Rovers	A	L	0–3		6,446	
9 September 2006	Brentford	H	D	1–1	Simpson 15'	5,420	
12 September 2006	Bristol City	A	L	1–2	Lockwood 66' pen.	9,726	
16 September 2006	Brighton & Hove Albion	A	L	1–4	Lockwood 83' pen.	6,003	
23 September 2006	Rotherham United	H	L	2–3	Chambers 20', Miller 68'	4,063	
26 September 2006	Gillingham	H	D	3–3	Lockwood 77' pen., 85', 88'	4,648	
30 September 2006	Blackpool	A	L	0–3		5,298	
7 October 2006	Chesterfield	H	D	0–0		4,309	
14 October 2006	Oldham Athletic	A	D	3–3	Ibehre 9', Alexander 59', 86'	5,014	
21 October 2006	Cheltenham Town	H	W	2–0	Alexander 6', Lockwood 66' pen.	4,310	
28 October 2006	Scunthorpe United	A	L	1–3	Easton 10'	4,795	
4 November 2006	Doncaster Rovers	A	D	0–0		5,447	
18 November 2006	Yeovil Town	H	D	0–0		4,842	
5 December 2006	Bradford City	H	L	1–2	Thelwell 29'	3,529	
9 December 2006	Huddersfield Town	H	W	1–0	Alexander 28'	4,300	
16 December 2006	Nottingham Forest	A	W	3–1	Guttridge 25', Chambers 45', Corden 69'	23,109	
19 December 2006	Northampton Town	A	W	1–0	Connor 79'	4,728	
23 December 2006	Crewe Alexandra	H	D	1–1	Lockwood 47' pen.	4,371	
26 December 2006	Gillingham	A	L	1–2	Walker 35'	8,216	
30 December 2006	Rotherham United	A	D	2–2	Chambers 15, Alexander 52'	4,715	
1 January 2007	Bristol City	H	D	1–1	Lockwood 62' pen.	4,814	
13 January 2007	Brentford	A	D	2–2	Ibehre 26', Connor 84'	6,765	
20 January 2007	Blackpool	H	L	0–1		5,217	
27 January 2007	Crewe Alexandra	A	W	4–0	Chambers 45', Corden 51', Ibehre 67', Tudor 83'	5,280	
3 February 2007	Port Vale	H	W	2–1	Lockwood 68', Ibehre 86'	4,295	
10 February 2007	AFC Bournemouth	A	L	0–5		5,985	
13 February 2007	Brighton & Hove Albion	H	L	1–4	Demetriou 87'	4,670	
17 February 2007	Carlisle United	H	D	1–1	Lockwood 47'	4,449	
20 February 2007	Millwall	A	W	5–2	Alexander 66' o.g., Hubertz 69'	10,356	
24 February 2007	Tranmere Rovers	H	W	3–1	Miller 18', Jarvis 29', 39'	4,832	
3 March 2007	Swansea City	A	D	0–0		12,901	
10 March 2007	Chesterfield	A	W	1–0	Tudor 53'	3,665	
17 March 2007	Oldham Athletic	H	D	2–2	Alexander 13, Hooper 70	5,443	
24 March 2007	Scunthorpe United	H	D	2–2	Corden 41', Hooper 87'	5,869	
31 March 2007	Cheltenham Town	A	L	1–2	Finnigan 13', Melligan 61'	4,300	
7 April 2007	Northampton Town	H	L	0–2		5,459	
9 April 2007	Yeovil Town	A	L	1–2	Jarvis 31'	5,206	
14 April 2007	Doncaster Rovers	H	D	1–1	Alexander 36'	4,697	
21 April 2007	Bradford City	A	W	2–0	Alexander 62', Tann 65'	10,665	
28 April 2007	Nottingham Forest	H	L	1–3	Lockwood 9'	7,206	
5 May 2007	Huddersfield Town	A	L	1–3	Demetriou 59'	10,842	

=== FA Cup ===
FA Cup match details
Round	Date	Opponents	Venue	Result	Score F–A	Scorers	Attendance	Ref.
First round	11 November 2006	Notts County	H	W	2–1	Corden 12', Miller 58'	3,011	
Second round	2 December 2006	Torquay United	A	D	1–1	Corden 76'	2,392	
Second round replay	12 December 2006	Torquay United	H	L	1–2	Walker 58'	2,384	

=== Football League Cup ===
Football League Cup match details
Round	Date	Opponents	Venue	Result	Score F–A	Scorers	Attendance	Ref.
First round	24 August 2006	West Bromwich Albion	H	L	0–3		3,058	

=== Football League Trophy ===
Football League Trophy match details
Round	Date	Opponents	Venue	Result	Score F–A	Scorers	Attendance	Ref.
Second round	1 November 2006	Leyton Orient	H	L	1–3	Duncan 63'	1,118	
