= 2010–11 Scottish Football League =

Irn-Bru Football League
- Season: 2010–11

Statistics of the Scottish Football League in season 2010–11.

== Scottish First Division ==
| Pos | Team | Pld | W | D | L | GF | GA | GD | Pts | Promotion, qualification or relegation |
|---|---|---|---|---|---|---|---|---|---|---|
| 1 | Dunfermline Athletic (C, P) | 36 | 20 | 10 | 6 | 66 | 31 | +35 | 70 | Promotion to the Premier League |
| 2 | Raith Rovers | 36 | 17 | 9 | 10 | 47 | 35 | +12 | 60 | |
| 3 | Falkirk | 36 | 17 | 7 | 12 | 57 | 41 | +16 | 58 | |
| 4 | Queen of the South | 36 | 14 | 7 | 15 | 54 | 53 | +1 | 49 | |
| 5 | Partick Thistle | 36 | 12 | 11 | 13 | 44 | 39 | +5 | 47 | |
| 6 | Dundee | 36 | 19 | 12 | 5 | 54 | 34 | +20 | 44 (Note: Dundee were docked 25 points for entering administration. The deduction was temporarily lifted pending an appeal by the club, however the appeal failed and the deduction was reinstated.) | |
| 7 | Greenock Morton | 36 | 11 | 10 | 15 | 39 | 43 | −4 | 43 | |
| 8 | Ross County | 36 | 9 | 14 | 13 | 30 | 34 | −4 | 41 | |
| 9 | Cowdenbeath (R) | 36 | 9 | 8 | 19 | 41 | 72 | −31 | 35 | Qualification for the First Division play-offs |
| 10 | Stirling Albion (R) | 36 | 4 | 8 | 24 | 32 | 82 | −50 | 20 | Relegation to the Second Division |

Source: SPFL
Rules for classification: 1) points; 2) goal difference; 3) number of goals scored.
(C) Champions; (P) Promoted; (R) Relegated

=== Play-offs ===
==== Semi-finals ====
| Team 1 | Agg. | Team 2 | 1st leg | 2nd leg |
|---|---|---|---|---|
| Brechin City | 4 – 2 | Cowdenbeath | 2–2 | 2–0 |
| Forfar Athletic | 4 – 7 | Ayr United | 1–4 | 3–3 |

==== Final ====
| Team 1 | Agg. | Team 2 | 1st leg | 2nd leg |
|---|---|---|---|---|
| Ayr United | 3 – 2 | Brechin City | 1–1 | 2–1 |

== Scottish Second Division ==
| Pos | Team | Pld | W | D | L | GF | GA | GD | Pts | Promotion, qualification or relegation |
|---|---|---|---|---|---|---|---|---|---|---|
| 1 | Livingston (C, P) | 36 | 25 | 7 | 4 | 79 | 33 | +46 | 82 | Promotion to the First Division |
| 2 | Ayr United (O, P) | 36 | 18 | 5 | 13 | 62 | 55 | +7 | 59 | Qualification for the First Division play-offs |
| 3 | Forfar Athletic | 36 | 17 | 8 | 11 | 50 | 48 | +2 | 59 | Qualification for the First Division play-offs |
| 4 | Brechin City | 36 | 15 | 12 | 9 | 63 | 45 | +18 | 57 | Qualification for the First Division play-offs |
| 5 | East Fife | 36 | 14 | 10 | 12 | 77 | 60 | +17 | 52 | |
| 6 | Airdrie United | 36 | 13 | 9 | 14 | 52 | 60 | −8 | 48 | |
| 7 | Dumbarton | 36 | 11 | 7 | 18 | 52 | 70 | −18 | 40 | |
| 8 | Stenhousemuir | 36 | 10 | 8 | 18 | 46 | 59 | −13 | 38 | |
| 9 | Alloa Athletic (R) | 36 | 9 | 9 | 18 | 49 | 71 | −22 | 36 | Qualification for the Second Division play-offs |
| 10 | Peterhead (R) | 36 | 5 | 11 | 20 | 47 | 76 | −29 | 26 | Relegation to the Third Division |

Source: SPFL
Rules for classification: 1) points; 2) goal difference; 3) number of goals scored.
(C) Champions; (O) Play-off winners; (P) Promoted; (R) Relegated

=== Play-offs ===
==== Semi-finals ====
| Team 1 | Agg. | Team 2 | 1st leg | 2nd leg |
|---|---|---|---|---|
| Annan Athletic | 2 – 1 | Alloa Athletic | 2–1 | 0–0 |
| Queen's Park | 1 – 3 | Albion Rovers | 1–1 | 0–2 |

==== Final ====
| Team 1 | Agg. | Team 2 | 1st leg | 2nd leg |
|---|---|---|---|---|
| Albion Rovers | 4 – 3 | Annan Athletic | 3–1 | 1–2 |

== Scottish Third Division ==
| Pos | Team | Pld | W | D | L | GF | GA | GD | Pts | Promotion or qualification |
|---|---|---|---|---|---|---|---|---|---|---|
| 1 | Arbroath (C, P) | 36 | 20 | 6 | 10 | 80 | 61 | +19 | 66 | Promotion to the Second Division |
| 2 | Albion Rovers (O, P) | 36 | 17 | 10 | 9 | 56 | 40 | +16 | 61 | Qualification for the Second Division Play-offs |
| 3 | Queen's Park | 36 | 18 | 5 | 13 | 57 | 43 | +14 | 59 | Qualification for the Second Division Play-offs |
| 4 | Annan Athletic | 36 | 16 | 11 | 9 | 58 | 45 | +13 | 59 | Qualification for the Second Division Play-offs |
| 5 | Stranraer | 36 | 15 | 12 | 9 | 72 | 57 | +15 | 57 | |
| 6 | Berwick Rangers | 36 | 12 | 13 | 11 | 62 | 56 | +6 | 49 | |
| 7 | Elgin City | 36 | 13 | 6 | 17 | 53 | 63 | −10 | 45 | |
| 8 | Montrose | 36 | 10 | 7 | 19 | 47 | 61 | −14 | 37 | |
| 9 | East Stirlingshire | 36 | 10 | 4 | 22 | 33 | 62 | −29 | 34 | |
| 10 | Clyde | 36 | 8 | 8 | 20 | 37 | 67 | −30 | 32 | |

Source: SPFL
Rules for classification: 1) points; 2) goal difference; 3) number of goals scored.
(C) Champions; (O) Play-off winners; (P) Promoted

=== Final ===
| Team 1 | Agg. | Team 2 | 1st leg | 2nd leg |
|---|---|---|---|---|
| Albion Rovers | 4 – 3 | Annan Athletic | 3–1 | 1–2 |

== See also ==
- 2010–11 in Scottish football
