= Steve Watts (footballer) =

English footballer (born 1976)

Personal information
- Date of birth: 11 July 1976 (age 50)
- Place of birth: Peckham, England
- Position: Striker

Senior career*
Years	Team	Apps	(Gls)
1998	Fisher Athletic	5	(2)
1998–2003	Leyton Orient	132	(29)
1999	→ Welling United (loan)	2	(2)
2002	→ Margate (loan)	7	(4)
2002–2003	→Lincoln City (loan)	5	(1)
2003	→ Dagenham & Redbridge (loan)	6	(2)
2003	Shrewsbury Town	15	(1)
2003–2004	Dagenham & Redbridge	12	(3)
2004	St Albans City	21	(9)
2004–2006	Fisher Athletic	10	(6)
2006	Bromley	2	(0)
2007–2008	Eastleigh	24	(5)
2008–2011	Sutton United	38	(8)
- * Club domestic league appearances and goals

Steve Watts (born 11 July 1976) is an English retired footballer who played as a striker, making over 100 Football League appearances for Leyton Orient. Watts is now a professional poker player who has cashed for a total of $777,429 up to and including September 2016.

== Career ==
=== Dulwich Hamlet and Fisher Athletic ===
Watts started his career with Dulwich Hamlet and moved to Fisher Athletic in the summer of 1998. He moved to Leyton Orient in October 1998 after winning The Sun newspaper's 'Search for a Striker' competition.

=== Leyton Orient ===
His debut for Leyton Orient was on 12 August 2000, away at Plymouth Argyle. He signed a three-year contract for Orient manager Tommy Taylor, despite interest from Millwall. Watts made 48 starts for Orient in the next two seasons, and 29 appearances as substitute, scoring 22 goals, before going to Margate on loan on 13 September 2002. At Margate he played in five games, scoring 3 goals and receiving 2 yellow cards. On his return to Brisbane Road in October he came on as sub in seven games, before another loan spell on 12 December, this time to Lincoln City, where he made five appearances. He was offered a permanent deal at Sincil Bank but rejected the deal, stating that he didn't feel a move to Lincoln would be beneficial for his career as he didn't think Lincoln would finish higher than Leyton Orient that season (Lincoln made the Playoffs, Leyton Orient finished midtable). He also had a brief loan spell at Welling United.

Orient manager Paul Brush placed Watts on the transfer list, claiming doubts in his work-rate and commitment, as his part-time modelling career seemed to be making too much of an impact.

Watts trialled at Bristol Rovers in January 2003. He was loaned again, this time to Dagenham & Redbridge on 10 February 2003, making four appearances and scoring 1 goal. In March he was then signed by Shrewsbury Town manager Kevin Ratcliffe. Watts revealed that Swansea City manager Brian Flynn also made contact with him prior to his signing for the Gay Meadow side on transfer deadline day.

=== Shrewsbury Town and Dagenham & Redbridge ===
Watts debuted for Shrewsbury Town in April 2003. He started seven games and came on as sub in eight more, however his tally was only one goal. On 17 October 2003, he was signed on a free transfer to Football Conference side Dagenham & Redbridge for the 2003–04 season. Watts was to depart The Daggers the same season, initially to Singapore, however this move fell through.

=== St. Albans City ===
Watts was signed by St Albans City in February 2004. He made 21 appearances, scoring nine times and receiving three cautions. He is remembered for his stunning injury time goal against Bedford Town in the play-off win which saw City promoted to the Conference South.

=== Fisher Athletic (second spell) and Bromley ===
The summer of 2004 saw Watts return to one of his first clubs, Fisher Athletic. In October 2006 he was nominated for FA Cup player of the round, for his hat-trick in Fisher's 6–1 defeat of Metropolitan Police.

In December 2006 Watts left Fisher by mutual consent. In that time Wattsy, as he was affectionally known to the Fisher fans, helped Fisher win the London Senior Cup 2004–05 and 2005–06, 2005–06Isthmian League Cup, Isthmian League Premier Division play-off promotion 2005–06 and the Southern League Eastern Division Championship 2004–05. In just two and a half seasons at the club Watts scored 95 goals for the Fish. In his first season Watts bagged 48 goals in the Southern League Eastern Division and finished as the league's top scorer.

A year later Watts fired Fish to promotion as he chipped in with 37 goals winning the Isthmian League Player of the year award in the process. In the 2005–06 Premier Division play-offs, scoring the winner in the semi-final against AFC Wimbledon and a 30-yard curler just four days later in the final. New Fisher manager Sami Muduroglu said on the move; 'Steve has been a fantastic servant to this football club. Everyone at the club is extremely sorry to see him go but it was a personal decision made by Steve, not the club. Steve feels that at 29, he needs to concentrate on other directions in his life and could no longer commit to full-time football. I respect that decision and I hope the supporters can understand Steve's reasons as well. He's been brilliant for this football club and everyone at Fisher wishes Steve all the best with his future endeavours.'

Watts returned to football briefly with Bromley. His signing was announced on 9 December 2006 by Bromley manager Mark Goldberg. Watts's tenure at the Kent side lasted less than a month before he was signed by Paul Doswell at Hampshire side Eastleigh.

=== Eastleigh ===
Watts debuted for Eastleigh on 20 January 2007 in the Conference South, in the 0–1 home defeat to Salisbury City. He came on as substitute with 30 minutes to go and was given a yellow card. On 3 May 2008 Watts was released by the Spitfires.

=== Sutton United ===
In June 2008 Watts followed new Sutton United manager Paul Doswell to Gander Green Lane, joining several other former Spitfires players at United including Karim El-Salahi, Chris Collins, Matt Hann, David Hughes, Rob Marshall and Jack Smith. A knee injury kept Watts on the sidelines until the last month of the 2008–09 season. In the 2009–10 season, Watts appeared more frequently. By the start of the 2010–11 season, Watts had made 34 appearances in all competitions for The Us, scoring 8 goals. At the end of the 2010–11 season, after making 15 appearances (eleven from the bench) and suffering from injury, Watts retired.

== Poker career ==
In June 2008 Watts won a spot in the Poker Million tournament. He has a World Poker Tour title from Marbella in 2014, but his biggest result to date was in finishing 59th in the prestigious World Series of Poker $10,000 entry Main Event in July 2013 for a career-high win of $123,597.

== Music management ==
Watts managed the prodigious singer Louisa Johnson, from Thurrock in Essex. She was the winner of the twelfth UK series of The X Factor in December 2015.
