= Darren Connell (footballer) =

English footballer

Personal information
- Date of birth: 3 February 1982 (age 44)
- Place of birth: Liverpool, England
- Height: 5 ft 10 in (1.78 m)
- Position: Striker

Senior career*
Years	Team	Apps	(Gls)
1999–2000	Blackpool	3	(0)
2000–2002	Macclesfield Town	2	(0)
2002–2003	Scarborough	32	(15)
2002	→ Hucknall Town (loan)	1	(0)
2002–2003	→ Barrow (loan)	9	(5)
2003	Accrington Stanley	0	(0)
2003	→ Burscough (loan)	28	(13)
2003–2004	Burscough	30	(18)
2004	Grantham Town	8	(3)
- * Club domestic league appearances and goals

Darren Connell (born 3 February 1982) is an English former professional footballer who played as a striker. He played in the Football League with Blackpool and Macclesfield Town

Connell has found his football career reinvigorated in his twilight years with Merseyside Christian League side St Cuthberts. He scored the winning goal in their 2013 National Trophy Final victory over Battle Baptist of Sussex and was awarded Man Of The Match by Linvoy Primus. Connell was top scorer for St Cuthberts in both league and cup in 2012/13 and is a key force behind their push for further national and league glory for 2013/14.
