= 2001 Football League play-offs =

Football League play-offs
- Season: 2000–01
- Champions: Bolton Wanderers (First Division); Walsall (Second Division); Blackpool (Third Division)
- Matches: 15
- Goals: 43 (2.87 per match)
- Biggest home win: Bolton 3–0 WBA (First Division)
- Biggest away win: Hartlepool 1–3 Blackpool (Third Division)
- Highest scoring: Walsall 4–2 Stoke; Blackpool 4–2 Leyton Orient (6 goals)
- Highest attendance: 54,328 – Bolton v Preston (First Division final)
- Lowest attendance: 5,720 – Blackpool v Hartlepool (Third Division semi-final)
- Average attendance: 21,183

The Football League play-offs for the 2000–01 season were held in May 2001, with the finals taking place at Millennium Stadium in Cardiff. The play-off semi-finals will be played over two legs and will be contested by the teams who finish in 3rd, 4th, 5th and 6th place in the Football League First Division and Football League Second Division and the 4th, 5th, 6th and 7th placed teams in the Football League Third Division table. The winners of the semi-finals will go through to the finals, with the winner of the matches gaining promotion for the following season.

== Background ==
The Football League play-offs have been held every year since 1987. They take place for each division following the conclusion of the regular season and are contested by the four clubs finishing below the automatic promotion places.

In the First Division, Bolton Wanderers, who are aiming to return to the top flight after nearly 3 seasons outside the top flight, finished 4 points behind second placed Blackburn Rovers, who in turn finished 10 points behind champions Fulham, who returned to the top flight for the first time since 1968. Preston North End who are aiming to return to the top flight for the first time since 1961, finished in fourth place in the table. Birmingham City, who are aiming to return to the top flight after 15 years outside the top division, finished in fifth place. West Bromwich Albion, who are also aiming to return to the top flight for the first time since 1986, finished 4 points behind Birmingham City and Preston North End in sixth place.

== First Division ==
Pos	Team	Pld	W	D	L	GF	GA	GD	Pts
3	Bolton Wanderers	46	24	15	7	76	45	+31	87
4	Preston North End	46	23	9	14	64	52	+12	78
5	Birmingham City	46	23	9	14	59	48	+11	78
6	West Bromwich Albion	46	21	11	14	60	52	+8	74

=== Semi-finals ===
First leg

13 May 2001
15:00

West Bromwich Albion	2–2	Bolton Wanderers
Roberts 44'; Hughes 55' (pen.)	Report	Bergsson 81'; Frandsen 88' (pen.)

The Hawthorns, West Bromwich
Attendance: 18,167
Referee: David Laws

13 May 2001
15:30

Birmingham City	1–0	Preston North End
Eaden 55'	Report

St Andrew's, Birmingham
Attendance: 29,072
Referee: David Pugh

Second leg

17 May 2001
19:45

Bolton Wanderers	3–0	West Bromwich Albion
Bergsson 10'; Ricketts 63'; Gardner 90'	Report

Reebok Stadium, Bolton
Attendance: 23,515
Referee: Roy Pearson

Bolton Wanderers won 5–2 on aggregate.

17 May 2001
19:45

Preston North End	2–1 (a.e.t.)	Birmingham City
Healy 24'; Rankine 90'	Report	Horsfield 59'
Penalties
Alexander (penalty scored); Healy (penalty scored); Gregan (penalty scored); Edwards (penalty missed); McKenna (penalty scored)	4–2	(penalty missed) Marcelo; (penalty missed) Purse; (penalty scored) Lazaridis; (penalty scored) Eaden

Deepdale, Preston
Attendance: 16,928
Referee: Paul Danson

Preston North End 2–2 Birmingham City on aggregate. Preston North End won 4–2 on penalties.

=== Final ===
28 May 2001
15:00

Bolton Wanderers	3–0	Preston North End
Farrelly 17'; Ricketts 89'; Gardner 90'	Report

Millennium Stadium, Cardiff
Attendance: 54,328
Referee: Uriah Rennie

== Second Division ==
Pos	Team	Pld	W	D	L	GF	GA	GD	Pts
3	Reading	46	25	11	10	86	52	+34	86
4	Walsall	46	23	12	11	79	50	+29	81
5	Stoke City	46	21	14	11	74	49	+25	77
6	Wigan Athletic	46	19	18	9	60	52	+8	75

=== Semi-finals ===
First leg

13 May 2001
15:00

Stoke City	0–0	Walsall
	Report

Britannia Stadium, Stoke-on-Trent
Attendance: 23,689
Referee: Uriah Rennie

13 May 2001
15:00

Wigan Athletic	0–0	Reading
	Report

JJB Stadium, Wigan
Attendance: 12,638
Referee: Roy Pearson

Second leg

16 May 2001
19:45

Reading	2–1	Wigan Athletic
Butler 86'; Forster 90'	Report	Nicholls 26'

Madjeski Stadium, Reading
Attendance: 22,034
Referee: David Laws

Reading won 2–1 on aggregate.

16 May 2001
19:45

Walsall	4–2	Stoke City
Ward 42' (o.g.); Matías 47', 61'; Keates 50'	Report	Kavanagh 31'; Thorne 85'

Bescot Stadium, Walsall
Attendance: 8,993
Referee: Eddie Wolstenholme

Walsall won 4–2 on aggregate.

=== Final ===
27 May 2001
15:00

Reading	2–3 (a.e.t.)	Walsall
Cureton 31'; Butler 91'	Report	Goodman 48'; Rougier 107' (o.g.); Byfield 109'

Millennium Stadium, Cardiff
Attendance: 50,496
Referee: Eddie Wolstenholme

== Third Division ==
Pos	Team	Pld	W	D	L	GF	GA	GD	Pts
4	Hartlepool United	46	21	14	11	71	54	+17	77
5	Leyton Orient	46	20	15	11	59	51	+8	75
6	Hull City	46	19	17	10	47	39	+8	74
7	Blackpool	46	22	6	18	74	58	+16	72

=== Semi-finals ===
First leg

13 May 2001
15:00

Blackpool	2–0	Hartlepool United
Ormerod 61', 78'	Report

Bloomfield Road, Blackpool
Attendance: 5,720
Referee: William Burns

13 May 2001
15:00

Hull City	1–0	Leyton Orient
Eyre 69'	Report

Boothferry Park, Kingston upon Hull
Attendance: 13,310
Referee: Eddie Wolstenholme

Second leg

16 May 2001
19:30

Hartlepool United	1–3	Blackpool
Henderson 48'	Report	Ormerod 21', 68'; Hills 50'

Victoria Park, Hartlepool
Attendance: 5,836
Referee: Uriah Rennie

Blackpool won 5–1 on aggregate.

16 May 2001
19:45

Leyton Orient	2–0	Hull City
Watts 44'; Lockwood 70'	Report

Brisbane Road, London
Attendance: 9,419
Referee: David Pugh

Leyton Orient won 2–1 on aggregate.

=== Final ===
26 May 2001
15:00

Blackpool	4–2	Leyton Orient
Hughes 35'; Reid 45'; Simpson 77'; Ormerod 88'	Report	Tate 1'; Houghton 37'

Millennium Stadium, Cardiff
Attendance: 23,600
Referee: David Pugh
