= Chris Tate (footballer) =

English footballer (born 1977)

Personal information
- Full name: Christopher Douglas Tate
- Date of birth: 27 December 1977 (age 48)
- Place of birth: York, England
- Height: 6 ft 0 in (1.83 m)
- Position: Striker

Youth career
- ?–1996: York City

Senior career*
Years	Team	Apps	(Gls)
1996–1997	Sunderland	0	(0)
1997–1999	Scarborough	50	(13)
1999	Halifax Town	19	(4)
1999–2000	Scarborough	33	(10)
2000	→ Leyton Orient (loan)	2	(0)
2000–2004	Leyton Orient	74	(10)
2001	→ Stevenage Borough (loan)	6	(2)
2002	→ Chester City (loan)	4	(1)
2002	→ Chester City (loan)	2	(0)
2004	Mansfield Town	4	(0)
2009	Goole	?	(?)
Total		194	(40)
- * Club domestic league appearances and goals

Christopher Douglas Tate (born 27 December 1977) is an English former footballer who played as a striker for various teams in the Football League.

== Career ==
Born in York, Tate started his career in the York City youth system before signing for Sunderland in July 1996.
