= 2005–06 Leyton Orient F.C. season =

Leyton Orient
2005–06 season
- Manager: Martin Ling
- Stadium: Brisbane Road
- League Two: 3rd (promoted)
- FA Cup: Fourth round
- League Cup: First round
- FL Trophy: Second round

The 2005–06 season was the 107th season in the history of Leyton Orient Football Club, an association football club based in Leyton, Greater London, England. It was their 90th season in the Football League, and their eleventh season in the fourth tier of English football, known as League Two since 2004.

The club finished third in League Two and won promotion to League One, the third tier of English football, which was secured after a 3–2 win over Oxford United in the final match of the season. The club also took part in the FA Cup, League Cup and Football League Trophy, which they were eliminated from in the fourth round, first round and second round respectively.

== Competitions ==
=== League Two ===
==== Table ====
Pos	Team	Pld	W	D	L	GF	GA	GD	Pts	Promotion, qualification or relegation
1	Carlisle United (C, P)	46	25	11	10	84	42	+42	86	Promotion to Football League One
2	Northampton Town (P)	46	22	17	7	63	37	+26	83	Promotion to Football League One
3	Leyton Orient (P)	46	22	15	9	67	51	+16	81	Promotion to Football League One
4	Grimsby Town	46	22	12	12	64	44	+20	78	Qualification for League Two play-offs
5	Cheltenham Town (O, P)	46	19	15	12	65	53	+12	72	Qualification for League Two play-offs

Rules for classification: In the Football League goals scored (GF) takes precedence over goal difference (GD).
(C) Champions; (O) Play-off winners; (P) Promoted

==== Matches ====
League Two match details
Date	Opponents	Venue	Result	Score F–A	Scorers	Attendance	Ref.
6 August 2005	Macclesfield Town	H	W	2–1	Keith 2', Echanomi 90'	3,600	
9 August 2005	Bury	A	W	2–1	Tudor 21', Zakuani 73'	2,053	
13 August 2005	Darlington	A	W	1–0	Lockwood 41' pen.	4,021	
20 August 2005	Rochdale	H	L	1–4	Echanomi 76'	4,223	
27 August 2005	Cheltenham Town	A	D	1–1	Mackie 20'	3,274	
29 August 2005	Shrewsbury Town	H	L	0–1		3,742	
3 September 2005	Bristol Rovers	H	L	2–3	Alexander 75', McMahon 89'	3,481	
10 September 2005	Barnet	A	W	3–2	Ibehre 40', Alexander 75', 89'	3,722	
17 September 2005	Wrexham	H	D	1–1	Alexander 80'	3,733	
24 September 2005	Carlisle United	A	W	3–2	Alexander 10', Lockwood 33' pen., Ibehre 36'	6,584	
27 September 2005	Torquay United	H	W	2–1	Ibehre 25', Alexander 50'	4,091	
1 October 2005	Mansfield Town	H	W	3–1	Keith 16', Alexander 59', Echanomi 76'	4,164	
8 October 2005	Stockport County	A	D	1–1	Alexander 71'	3,901	
15 October 2005	Lincoln City	H	D	1–1	Alexander 18'	4,837	
22 October 2005	Grimsby Town	A	W	1–0	Easton 44'	4,963	
29 October 2005	Oxford United	H	W	1–0	Easton 45'	5,268	
12 November 2005	Peterborough United	A	D	1–1	Miller 74'	5,341	
19 November 2005	Stockport County	H	D	2–2	Raynes 24' o.g., Mackie 63'	4,997	
26 November 2005	Macclesfield Town	A	D	0–0		1,649	
6 December 2005	Chester City	H	L	0–1		3,463	
10 December 2005	Bury	H	L	0–1		4,095	
17 December 2005	Rochdale	A	W	4–2	Alexander 10', Tudor 35', Alexander 47', Mackie 76'	2,666	
26 December 2005	Rushden & Diamonds	H	W	5–1	Mackie 27', Steele 29', 36', Ibehre 74', Easton 87'	4,558	
29 December 2005	Wycombe Wanderers	A	L	2–4	Steele 21', Tudor 68'	6,240	
31 December 2005	Notts County	H	W	1–0	Ibehre 45'	3,715	
2 January 2006	Boston United	A	W	2–1	Ibehre 44', Alexander 58'	2,689	
14 January 2006	Northampton Town	H	L	1–2	McMahon 86'	5,445	
21 January 2006	Wrexham	A	W	2–1	Alexander 4', Lockwood 43' pen.	5,031	
31 January 2006	Bristol Rovers	A	D	3–3	Ibehre 48', 57', Simpson 62'	5,966	
4 February 2006	Torquay United	A	L	0–2		2,687	
11 February 2006	Carlisle United	H	D	0–0		5,833	
14 February 2006	Northampton Town	A	D	1–1	Mackie 65'	5,552	
18 February 2006	Chester City	A	W	2–0	Lockwood 35' pen., Connor 72'	2,210	
25 February 2006	Darlington	H	W	1–0	Tudor 13'	4,767	
28 February 2006	Barnet	H	D	0–0		4,910	
4 March 2006	Shrewsbury Town	A	D	3–3	Lockwood 19', Connor 26', Tann 47'	3,471	
11 March 2006	Cheltenham Town	H	W	1–0	Connor 23'	4,879	
18 March 2006	Rushden & Diamonds	A	L	0–1		3,679	
25 March 2006	Wycombe Wanderers	H	W	1–0	Connor 6'	6,720	
1 April 2006	Notts County	A	D	1–1	Corden 48'	5,007	
8 April 2006	Boston United	H	W	2–0	Lockwood 51' pen., Connor 89'	4,391	
15 April 2006	Mansfield Town	A	W	1–0	Lockwood 75' pen.	4,763	
17 April 2006	Grimsby Town	H	D	0–0		6,582	
22 April 2006	Lincoln City	A	D	1–1	Mackie 2'	5,660	
29 April 2006	Peterborough United	H	W	2–1	Lockwood 15' pen., Corden 70'	6,591	
6 May 2006	Oxford United	A	W	3–2	Easton 17', Alexander 64', Steele 90'	12,243	

=== FA Cup ===
FA Cup match details
Round	Date	Opponents	Venue	Result	Score F–A	Scorers	Attendance	Ref.
First round	5 November 2005	Chesterfield	H	D	0–0		3,554	
First round replay	16 November 2005	Chesterfield	A	W	2–1	Mackie 18', Tudor 43'	4,895	
Second round	3 December 2005	Rushden & Diamonds	A	W	1–0	Steele 66'	3,245	
Third round	8 January 2006	Fulham	A	W	2–1	Easton 17', Keith 58'	13,394	
Fourth round	28 January 2006	Charlton Athletic	A	L	1–2	Steele 53'	22,029	

=== League Cup ===
Football League Cup match details
Round	Date	Opponents	Venue	Result	Score F–A	Scorers	Attendance	Ref.
First round	23 August 2005	Luton Town	H	L	1–3	McMahon 90'	2,383	

=== Football League Trophy ===
Football League Trophy match details
Round	Date	Opponents	Venue	Result	Score F–A	Scorers	Attendance	Ref.
First round	18 October 2005	Yeovil Town	H	W	2–0	Hanson 37', Alexander 76'	958	
Second round	23 November 2005	Oxford United	A	L	0–1		1,521	
