= Ian Hughes (footballer, born 1974) =

Welsh footballer

Personal information
- Date of birth: 2 August 1974 (age 52)
- Place of birth: Bangor, Wales
- Position: Defender

Youth career
- Bury

Senior career*
Years	Team	Apps	(Gls)
1991–1997	Bury	160	(1)
1997–2003	Blackpool	160	(4)
2003–2004	Huddersfield Town	13	(1)
2004–2008	Bacup Borough		

International career
- Wales U21
- * Club domestic league appearances and goals

Ian Hughes (born 2 August 1974) is a Wales former professional footballer. He played as a defender and was a Welsh under-21 international.

== Playing career ==
=== Club career ===
Born in Bangor, Gwynedd, Hughes began his career at Bury where he was in the youth team. He played in central defence for the club in six years between 1991 and 1997 making 202 appearances in all competitions for the Shakers and scoring two goals.

In December 1997 he moved to Blackpool for a transfer fee of £200,000. He became the Seasiders' club captain wearing the number 5 shirt making 191 appearances in total, scoring six goals between 1997 and 2003.

In the 2000–01 season he scored in the Third Division Play-Off final at the Millennium Stadium in Cardiff as the Seasiders beat Leyton Orient to earn promotion. The following season, he helped Blackpool win the Football League Trophy at the same venue, playing as a substitute in the final.

After spending the 2002-03 season struggling with injuries which had seen him out of action for six months from October 2002 to April 2003, he was released at the end of the season,

After a short trial, in July 2003 he moved to Huddersfield Town where he stayed for one season.

Hughes signed for North West Counties Football League club Bacup Borough in August 2004 for whom he was club captain.

=== International career ===
Hughes played fifteen games for Wales at under-21 level.

== Honours ==
Bury

- Football League Second Division: 1996–97

Blackpool

- Football League Third Division play-offs: 2001
- Football League Trophy: 2001–02
