= 2008–09 Blackpool F.C. season =

English football club season

Blackpool F.C.
2008–09 season
- Owner: Owen Oyston
- Chairman: Karl Oyston
- Manager: Simon Grayson (until 23 December 2008); Tony Parkes (from 23 December 2008)
- Stadium: Bloomfield Road
- Championship: 16th
- FA Cup: Third round
- League Cup: First round
- Top goalscorer: League: DJ Campbell (9); All: DJ Campbell (9)
- Highest home attendance: 9,643 vs Preston North End, Championship, 16 November 2008
- Lowest home attendance: 6,648 vs Charlton Athletic, Championship, 6 December 2008
- Average home league attendance: 7,843
- Biggest win: 2–0 vs 3 teams
- Biggest defeat: 1–4 vs Derby County, Championship, 18 February 2009; 0–3 vs Queens Park Rangers, Championship, 27 January 2009

The 2008–09 season was Blackpool F.C.'s 101st season (98th consecutive) in the Football League. It was also their second consecutive season in the Championship, the second tier of English football. They finished sixteenth.

D. J. Campbell, on loan from Leicester City, was the club's top scorer, with nine goals overall.

Simon Grayson resigned as manager on 23 December, to become the new manager of Leeds United. His assistant, Tony Parkes, took over as caretaker manager (his seventh such appointment), until the end of the season.

== First-team squad ==
Squad at end of season

Note: Flags indicate national team as defined under FIFA eligibility rules; some limited exceptions apply. Players may hold more than one non-FIFA nationality.

No.	Pos.	Nation	Player
1	GK	USA	Paul Rachubka
2	DF	ENG	Danny Coid
3	DF	SCO	Stephen Crainey
4	MF	ENG	Keith Southern
5	DF	ENG	Marlon Broomes
6	DF	ENG	Ian Evatt
7	FW	IRL	Roy O'Donovan (on loan from Sunderland)
8	MF	SCO	Stephen McPhee
9	FW	ENG	DJ Campbell (on loan from Leicester City)
10	MF	ENG	Stuart Green
11	MF	WAL	David Vaughan
12	FW	ENG	Gary Taylor-Fletcher
13	GK	ENG	Mark Halstead
14	MF	ENG	David Fox
15	DF	ENG	Alex Baptiste
16	MF	FRO	Claus Bech Jørgensen
17	MF	ENG	Jermaine Wright

No.	Pos.	Nation	Player
18	MF	ENG	Joe Martin
19	MF	ENG	Wade Small (on loan from Sheffield Wednesday)
21	GK	ENG	Matt Gilks
22	MF	ENG	Graeme Owens (on loan from Middlesbrough)
24	DF	WAL	Rob Edwards
25	DF	ENG	Shaun Barker
26	MF	SCO	Charlie Adam (on loan from Rangers)
27	FW	IRL	Ben Burgess
28	MF	IRL	Alan Mahon (on loan from Burnley)
39	MF	ENG	Matty Kay
30	DF	ENG	Ashton Bayliss
31	FW	ENG	Danny Mitchley
33	FW	ENG	Brett Ormerod
34	MF	BEL	Francesco Carratta
35	FW	ENG	Lee Hughes (on loan from Oldham Athletic)
37	MF	ENG	Simon Walton (on loan from Plymouth Argyle)

=== Left club during season ===
Note: Flags indicate national team as defined under FIFA eligibility rules; some limited exceptions apply. Players may hold more than one non-FIFA nationality.

No.	Pos.	Nation	Player
7	MF	ENG	Adam Hammill (on loan from Liverpool)
19	FW	ENG	Steve Kabba (on loan from Watford)
19	FW	HUN	Krisztián Németh (on loan from Liverpool)
20	DF	GUI	Mo Camara (on loan from Derby County)
20	MF	ENG	Kyel Reid (on loan from West Ham United)
20	FW	ENG	Nick Blackman (on loan from Blackburn Rovers)
22	DF	PAK	Zesh Rehman (on loan from Queens Park Rangers)
23	FW	WAL	Daniel Nardiello (on loan to Hartlepool United)
26	FW	ENG	Sone Aluko (on loan from Birmingham City)

No.	Pos.	Nation	Player
26	MF	SCO	Alan Gow (on loan from Rangers)
28	MF	CAN	Michael D'Agostino (on loan to Hereford United)
28	MF	ENG	Paul Marshall (on loan from Manchester City)
32	MF	ENG	Ross Lloyd (to Burscough)
33	MF	ENG	Dominic Merella (to Burscough)
34	MF	ENG	Lee Hendrie (on loan from Sheffield United)
35	FW	ENG	Liam Dickinson (on loan from Derby County)
36	GK	IRL	Graham Stack (on loan from Plymouth Argyle)
37	DF	IRL	Ian Harte (on loan from Carlisle United)

== Table ==
Pos	Team	Pld	W	D	L	GF	GA	GD	Pts
14	Doncaster Rovers	46	17	7	22	42	53	−11	58
15	Crystal Palace	46	15	12	19	52	55	−3	56 (Note: Crystal Palace were give a one-point deduction for using an ineligible player during a match against Sheffield United on 3 May 2009.)
16	Blackpool	46	13	17	16	47	58	−11	56
17	Coventry City	46	13	15	18	47	58	−11	54
18	Derby County	46	14	12	20	55	67	−12	54

Updated to match(es) played on 3 May 2009. Source: The Football League
Rules for classification: 1) points; 2) goal difference; 3) number of goals scored.

== Pre-season ==
12 July 2008 Friendly	Fleetwood Town	1–2	Blackpool	Fleetwood, England
15:00 BST		Report		Stadium: Highbury Stadium

14 July 2008 Friendly	FK Daugava Riga	1–1	Blackpool	Riga, Latvia
18:00 BST		Report		Stadium: Daugava Stadium

19 July 2008 Friendly	Wrexham	0–0	Blackpool	Wrexham, Wales
15:00 BST		Report		Stadium: Racecourse Ground

29 July 2008 Friendly	Blackpool	0–2	St Mirren	Blackpool, England
19:45 BST		Report		Stadium: Bloomfield Road

2 August 2008 Friendly	Tranmere Rovers	1–0	Blackpool	Birkenhead, England
15:00 BST		Report		Stadium: Prenton Park

== Season proper ==
=== Football League Championship ===
==== League table ====
Pos	Team	Pld	W	D	L	GF	GA	GD	Pts
14	Doncaster Rovers	46	17	7	22	42	53	−11	58
15	Crystal Palace	46	15	12	19	52	55	−3	56 (Note: Crystal Palace were give a one-point deduction for using an ineligible player during a match against Sheffield United on 3 May 2009.)
16	Blackpool	46	13	17	16	47	58	−11	56
17	Coventry City	46	13	15	18	47	58	−11	54
18	Derby County	46	14	12	20	55	67	−12	54

Updated to match(es) played on 3 May 2009. Source: The Football League
Rules for classification: 1) points; 2) goal difference; 3) number of goals scored.

==== Results ====
===== In summary =====
Overall								Home						Away					
Pld	W	D	L	GF	GA	GD	Pts	W	D	L	GF	GA	GD	W	D	L	GF	GA	GD
46	13	17	16	47	58	−11	56	5	8	10	25	33	−8	8	9	6	22	25	−3

Source: Sky

===== By matchday =====
Matchday	1	2	3	4	5	6	7	8	9	10	11	12	13	14	15	16	17	18	19	20	21	22	23	24	25	26	27	28	29	30	31	32	33	34	35	36	37	38	39	40	41	42	43	44	45	46
Ground	H	A	H	A	H	A	A	H	A	H	A	H	H	A	A	H	H	A	H	A	H	A	A	H	A	H	A	H	H	A	H	A	A	H	A	H	H	A	A	H	H	A	H	A	H	A
Result	L	D	L	W	W	L	W	D	D	D	D	W	D	L	W	L	L	L	L	W	W	L	D	D	D	D	L	W	L	W	L	D	L	L	D	L	W	D	W	D	L	W	D	D	D	W
Position	19	16	21	15	12	16	10	13	14	16	17	12	11	14	12	15	16	18	18	18	15	16	16	16	17	17	17	15	15	12	15	15	17	17	20	21	19	19	18	18	18	18	18	17	18	16

Updated to match(es) played on 03 May 2009. Source: 11v11
A = Away; H = Home; W = Win; D = Draw; L = Loss

===== In detail =====
9 August 2008 1	Blackpool	0–1	Bristol City	Blackpool
15:00 BST	Camara (yellow card) 76'	Report	Skuse (yellow card) 19'; Orr (yellow card) 55'; Weale (yellow card) 72'; Brooker 90'	Stadium: Bloomfield Road; Attendance: 8,244; Referee: Graham Laws

16 August 2008 2	Norwich City	1–1	Blackpool	Norwich
15:00 BST	Russell (yellow card) 66', (goal) 74'	Report	Hammill (yellow card) 47'; Burgess 55' (pen.); Evatt (yellow card) 68'; Camara (yellow card) 77'; Taylor-Fletcher (yellow card) 90+5'	Stadium: Carrow Road; Attendance: 23,727; Referee: Kevin Friend

23 August 2008 3	Blackpool	1–3	Sheffield United	Blackpool
15:00 BST	Hammill (yellow card) 70'; Kabba 74'	Report	Quinn 21'; Henderson (yellow card) 42'; Speed 57' (pen.); Halford 78'	Stadium: Bloomfield Road; Attendance: 8,611; Referee: Scott Mathieson

30 August 2008 4	Southampton	0–1	Blackpool	Southampton
12:45 BST	Surman (yellow card) 28'; Gillett (yellow card) 42'; James (yellow card) 61'; Svensson (yellow card) 83'	Report	Burgess 45' (pen.); Camara (yellow card) 79'	Stadium: St Mary's Stadium; Attendance: 15,629; Referee: Andre Marriner

13 September 2008 5	Blackpool	1–0	Barnsley	Blackpool
15:00 BST	Taylor-Fletcher (yellow card) 43'; Kabba (yellow card) 72', (goal) 86'; Vaughan (yellow card) 74'	Report	Foster (yellow card) 32'; Odejayi (yellow card) 78'; Moore (yellow card) 81'	Stadium: Bloomfield Road; Attendance: 8,363; Referee: Tony Bates

16 September 2008 6	Burnley	2–0	Blackpool	Burnley
19:45 BST	Paterson 60'; Alexander 76' (pen.)	Report		Stadium: Turf Moor; Attendance: 13,752; Referee: Jonathan Moss

20 September 2008 7	Birmingham City	0–1	Blackpool	Birmingham
15:00 BST		Report	Camara (yellow card) 12'; Taylor-Fletcher 47'	Stadium: St Andrew's (stadium); Attendance: 20,983; Referee: Mick Russell

27 September 2008 8	Blackpool	1–1	Coventry City	Blackpool
15:00 BST	Burgess 58'	Report	Tabb (yellow card) 53'; Eastwood 69'; Fox (yellow card) 75'	Stadium: Bloomfield Road; Attendance: 8,462; Referee: Michael Oliver

30 September 2008 9	Queens Park Rangers	1–1	Blackpool	White City
20:00 BST	Leigertwood (yellow card) 68'; Blackstock 79'	Report	Taylor-Fletcher 18'	Stadium: Loftus Road; Attendance: 12,500; Referee: Grant Hegley

4 October 2008 10	Blackpool	1–1	Cardiff City	Blackpool
12:30 BST	Vaughan (yellow card) 66'; Gow 90+5'	Report	Comminges (yellow card) 59'; Parry 83'	Stadium: Bloomfield Road; Attendance: 7,328; Referee: Nigel Miller

18 October 2008 11	Doncaster Rovers	0–0	Blackpool	Doncaster
15:00 BST	Mills (yellow card) 54'; Stock (yellow card) 68'	Report	Gow (yellow card) 89'	Stadium: Keepmoat Stadium; Attendance: 11,342; Referee: Darren Drysdale

21 October 2008 12	Blackpool	3–2	Derby County	Blackpool
19:45 BST	Gow 35'; Taylor-Fletcher 43'; Burgess 65'	Report	Hulse (yellow card) 2'; Commons 58'; Sterjovski 77', (yellow card) 90+3'	Stadium: Bloomfield Road; Attendance: 7,267; Referee: Andy Hall

25 October 2008 13	Blackpool	2–2	Crystal Palace	Blackpool
15:00 BST	Burgess 48'; Evatt (yellow card) 51', (goal) 65'	Report	Ifill 28'; Beattie 49'; McCarthy (yellow card) 56'	Stadium: Bloomfield Road; Attendance: 7,597; Referee: Anthony Taylor

28 October 2008 14	Cardiff City	2–0	Blackpool	Cardiff
19:45 GMT	Purse (yellow card) 6'; Whittingham 83'; McCormack 86'	Report	Barker (yellow card) 59'; Evatt (yellow card) 88'	Stadium: Ninian Park; Attendance: 17,570; Referee: Rob Shoebridge

1 November 2008 15	Watford	3–4	Blackpool	Watford
15:00 GMT	Hoskins 4'; Rasiak 36'; Smith 68' (pen.); Harley (yellow card) 88'	Report	Southern 18', (yellow card) 45+1'; Burgess 56'; Taylor-Fletcher (yellow card) 73', (goal) 85'; Hammill (yellow card) 80'; Gow 90+3', (yellow card) 90+3'	Stadium: Vicarage Road; Attendance: 13,517; Referee: Roger East

8 November 2008 16	Blackpool	0–1	Ipswich Town	Blackpool
15:00 GMT	Southern (yellow card) 65'; Fox 86'	Report	Norris 42', (yellow card) 90+1'	Stadium: Bloomfield Road; Attendance: 7,349; Referee: Colin Webster

16 November 2008 17	Blackpool	1–3	Preston North End	Blackpool
13:00 GMT	Hammill 10', (yellow card) 78'; Barker (yellow card) 75'; Hendrie (yellow card) 90+1'	Report	Brown 55', 77', (yellow card) 88'; Mellor 68', (yellow card) 69'	Stadium: Bloomfield Road; Attendance: 9,643; Referee: Mike Dean

22 November 2008 18	Wolverhampton Wanderers	2–0	Blackpool	Wolverhampton
15:00 GMT	Iwelumo 30', 66'; Edwards (yellow card) 63'	Report	Hendrie (yellow card) 44'; Evatt (yellow card) 90'	Stadium: Molineux; Attendance: 22,044; Referee: Andy D'Urso

25 November 2008 19	Blackpool	0–2	Sheffield Wednesday	Blackpool
19:45 GMT		Report	Tudgay 61'; Burton 86'	Stadium: Bloomfield Road; Attendance: 7,054; Referee: Carl Boyeson

29 November 2008 20	Plymouth Argyle	1–2	Blackpool	Plymouth
15:00 GMT	Gallagher 67'	Report	Dickinson 78', 81'	Stadium: Home Park; Attendance: 9,969; Referee: Trevor Kettle

6 December 2008 21	Blackpool	2–0	Charlton Athletic	Blackpool
15:00 GMT	Evatt (yellow card) 27'; Dickinson 47', 56'	Report		Stadium: Bloomfield Road; Attendance: 6,648; Referee: Michael Jones

9 December 2008 22	Reading	1–0	Blackpool	Reading
20:00 GMT	Ingimarsson 27'; Gunnarsson (yellow card) 67'	Report	Hendrie (red card) 33'; Edwards (yellow card) 82'; Taylor-Fletcher (yellow card) 86'	Stadium: Madejski Stadium; Attendance: 16,514; Referee: Jarnail Singh

13 December 2008 23	Nottingham Forest	0–0	Blackpool	Nottingham
15:00 GMT	Perch (yellow card) 57'	Report	Baptiste (yellow card) 9'; Barker (yellow card) 64'; Fox (yellow card) 80'; Reid (yellow card) 90+2'	Stadium: City Ground; Attendance: 19,103; Referee: Pat Miller

20 December 2008 24	Blackpool	1–1	Swansea City	Blackpool
15:00 GMT	Fox (yellow card) 59'; Gow 54'	Report	Scotland 67'; Butler (yellow card) 87'	Stadium: Bloomfield Road; Attendance: 7,007; Referee: Darren Deadman

26 December 2008 25	Sheffield Wednesday	1–1	Blackpool	Sheffield
15:00 GMT	Buxton (yellow card) 47'; Slusarski 55'; O'Connor (yellow card) 82'	Report	Gow 48' (pen.); Reid (yellow card) 51'; Southern (yellow card) 67'; Taylor-Fletcher (yellow card) 90+1'; Dickinson (yellow card) 90+3'	Stadium: Hillsborough; Attendance: 25,044; Referee: Michael Oliver

29 December 2008 26	Blackpool	2–2	Wolverhampton Wanderers	Blackpool
19:45 GMT	Taylor-Fletcher 10'; O'Connor (yellow card) 82'	Report	Ebanks-Blake 4' (pen.); Stearman (yellow card) 43'; Jarvis 70'; Jones 77'; Ward (yellow card) 84'	Stadium: Bloomfield Road; Attendance: 8,906; Referee: Kevin Friend

17 January 2009 27	Coventry City	2–1	Blackpool	Coventry
15:00 GMT	Gunnarsson (yellow card) 14'; Beuzelin 47'; Mifsud 51'	Report	Campbell 25'; Southern (yellow card) 33'; O'Donovan (yellow card) 90+3'	Stadium: Ricoh Arena; Attendance: 15,551; Referee: Craig Pawson

24 January 2009 28	Blackpool	2–0	Birmingham City	Blackpool
15:00 GMT	Campbell 13', (yellow card) 70'; Southern 37'; O'Donovan (yellow card) 63'; Jørgensen (red card) 74'	Report	Taylor (yellow card) 52'	Stadium: Bloomfield Road; Attendance: 8,105; Referee: Steve Tanner

27 January 2009 29	Blackpool	0–3	Queens Park Rangers	Blackpool
19:45 GMT		Report	Helguson 17', 58' (pen.); Cook (yellow card) 60'; Routledge (yellow card) 83'; Ephraim 90+1'	Stadium: Bloomfield Road; Attendance: 6,656; Referee: Graham Laws

31 January 2009 30	Crystal Palace	0–1	Blackpool	Selhurst
15:00 GMT	Fonte (yellow card) 22'	Report	Rachubka (red card) 3'; Campbell 41' (pen.); Taylor-Fletcher (yellow card) 87'	Stadium: Selhurst Park; Attendance: 13,810; Referee: Andre Marriner

7 February 2009 31	Blackpool	2–3	Doncaster Rovers	Blackpool
15:00 GMT	Vaughan 15'; O'Donovan (yellow card) 35'; Campbell 55'; Adam (red card) 77'	Report	Stock 23'; Hird 54'; Coppinger 64'	Stadium: Bloomfield Road; Attendance: 7,452; Referee: Anthony Taylor

14 February 2009 32	Ipswich Town	1–1	Blackpool	Ipswich
15:00 GMT	Miller 34'; Thatcher (yellow card) 38'	Report	Baptiste 28'; Vaughan (yellow card) 39'; O'Donovan (yellow card) 52'	Stadium: Portman Road; Attendance: 19,299; Referee: Phil Crossley

18 February 2009 33	Derby County	4–1	Blackpool	Derby
19:45 GMT	Commons 9', 74'; McEveley (yellow card) 57'; Green 87'; Barazite 89'	Report	Edwards 31'; Barker (yellow card) 65'; Baptiste (yellow card) 83'	Stadium: Pride Park; Attendance: 26,834; Referee: Dean Whitestone

21 February 2009 34	Blackpool	0–2	Watford	Blackpool
15:00 GMT	O'Donovan (yellow card) 33'	Report	Williamson (yellow card) 42', (goal) 54'; Priskin (yellow card) 75', (goal) 85'	Stadium: Bloomfield Road; Attendance: 7,451; Referee: Jonathan Moss

28 February 2009 35	Bristol City	0–0	Blackpool	Bristol
15:00 GMT		Report	Ormerod (yellow card) 26'; Adam (yellow card) 63'	Stadium: Ashton Gate; Attendance: 16,855; Referee: Fred Graham

3 March 2009 36	Blackpool	0–1	Burnley	Blackpool
19:45 GMT	Barker (yellow card) 10'; Crainey (yellow card) 41'; Jørgensen (yellow card) 88'	Report	Kalvenes (yellow card) 63', (goal) 85'; McDonald (yellow card) 75'	Stadium: Bloomfield Road; Attendance: 7,679; Referee: Lee Mason

7 March 2009 37	Blackpool	2–0	Norwich City	Blackpool
15:00 GMT	Adam (yellow card) 42', (goal) 74'; Ormerod 55', (yellow card) 56'	Report	Doherty (yellow card) 40'	Stadium: Bloomfield Road; Attendance: 7,505; Referee: Clive Oliver

10 March 2009 38	Sheffield United	2–2	Blackpool	Sheffield
19:45 GMT	Coid 5' (o.g.); Cotterill 73' (pen.)	Report	Barker (yellow card) 37'; Blackman 42'; Campbell 50'; Rachubka (yellow card) 72'	Stadium: Bramall Lane; Attendance: 25,273; Referee: Russell Booth

13 March 2009 39	Barnsley	0–1	Blackpool	Barnsley
15:00 GMT	El Haimour (yellow card) 62'; Moore (yellow card) 73'	Report	Edwards (yellow card) 39'; Small 70', (yellow card) 70'; Adam (yellow card) 86'	Stadium: Oakwell; Attendance: 12,228; Referee: Colin Webster

21 March 2009 40	Blackpool	1–1	Southampton	Blackpool
15:00 GMT	Campbell 20' (pen.); Mahon (yellow card) 23'; Edwards (yellow card) 83'; Barker (yellow card) 90+5'	Report	Saeijs (yellow card) 19'; McGoldrick 69', (yellow card) 79'; Perry (yellow card) 77'	Stadium: Bloomfield Road; Attendance: 7,947; Referee: Dave Foster

4 April 2009 41	Blackpool	0–1	Plymouth Argyle	Blackpool
15:00 BST	Crainey (yellow card) 29'	Report	Sawyer 86'	Stadium: Bloomfield Road; Attendance: 8,103; Referee: Mark Haywood

11 April 2009 42	Preston North End	0–1	Blackpool	Preston
13:00 BST		Report	Adam (yellow card) 35', (goal) 43'	Stadium: Deepdale; Attendance: 21,273; Referee: Andy D'Urso

13 April 2009 43	Blackpool	2–2	Reading	Blackpool
15:00 BST	Southern 31'; Baptiste (yellow card) 56'; Campbell 66'	Report	Hunt 10', (yellow card) 81'; Karacan 24', (yellow card) 47'	Stadium: Bloomfield Road; Attendance: 7,722; Referee: Kevin Wright

18 April 2009 44	Charlton Athletic	2–2	Blackpool	Charlton
15:00 BST	Burton 48'; Shelvey 49'; Hudson (yellow card) 66'; Youga (yellow card) 68'	Report	Campbell 67' (pen.); Hughes 90+3'	Stadium: The Valley; Attendance: 19,615; Referee: Mick Russell

25 April 2009 45	Blackpool	1–1	Nottingham Forest	Blackpool
12:30 BST	Ormerod 30'; Adam (yellow card) 37'; Evatt (red card) 68'; Crainey (yellow card) 73'	Report	Blackstock 9'; Chambers (yellow card) 54'; Garner (yellow card) 80'	Stadium: Bloomfield Road; Attendance: 9,279; Referee: Jonathan Moss

3 May 2009 46	Swansea City	0–1	Blackpool	Swansea
13:15 BST	Tate (yellow card) 70'	Report	Campbell 13'; Ormerod (yellow card) 60'	Stadium: Liberty Stadium; Attendance: 16,316; Referee: Carl Boyeson

=== FA Cup ===
3 January 2009 Third Round	Torquay United	1–0	Blackpool	Torquay
15:00 GMT	Green 32'; Sills (yellow card) 65'	Report	Barker (yellow card) 67'; Harte (yellow card) 84'; Evatt (yellow card) 87'	Stadium: Plainmoor; Attendance: 3,654; Referee: Andy Penn

=== Football League Cup ===
12 August 2008 First Round	Macclesfield Town	2–0	Blackpool	Macclesfield
19:45 BST	Brisley (yellow card) 16', (goal) 25'; Dunfield (red card) 59'; Gritton 59'	Report	Edwards (yellow card) 27'; Southern (red card) 57'	Stadium: Moss Rose; Attendance: 1,631; Referee: Mark Haywood

== Squad statistics ==
No.	Pos.	Name	League		FA Cup		League Cup		League Trophy		Total		Discipline	
No.	Pos.	Name	Apps	Goals	Apps	Goals	Apps	Goals	Apps	Goals	Apps	Goals	Yellow card	Red card
1	GK	(United States) Paul Rachubka	42	0	1	0	0	0	0	0	43	0	1	1
2	MF	(England) Danny Coid	18	0	1	0	1	0	0	0	20	0	0	0
3	DF	(Scotland) Stephen Crainey	17	0	0	0	0	0	0	0	17	0	3	0
4	MF	(England) Keith Southern	35	3	1	0	1	0	0	0	37	3	4	1
5	DF	(England) Marlon Broomes	1	0	0	0	0	0	0	0	1	0	0	0
6	DF	(England) Ian Evatt	33	1	1	0	1	0	0	0	35	1	6	1
7	MF	(England) Adam Hammill	22	1	0	0	1	0	0	0	23	1	4	0
7	MF	(Republic of Ireland) Roy O'Donovan	12	0	0	0	0	0	0	0	12	0	5	0
8	FW	(Scotland) Stephen McPhee	5	0	0	0	0	0	0	0	5	0	0	0
9	FW	(England) DJ Campbell	20	9	0	0	0	0	0	0	29	9	1	0
10	MF	(England) Stuart Green	0	0	1	0	1	0	0	0	2	0	0	0
11	MF	(Wales) David Vaughan	33	1	1	0	1	0	0	0	35	0	3	0
12	FW	(England) Gary Taylor-Fletcher	38	5	0	0	1	0	0	0	39	5	6	0
13	GK	(England) Mark Halstead	0	0	0	0	0	0	0	0	0	0	0	0
14	MF	(England) David Fox	22	0	1	0	0	0	0	0	23	0	3	0
15	DF	(England) Alex Baptiste	21	1	0	0	0	0	0	0	21	1	3	0
16	MF	(Faroe Islands) Claus Jørgensen	32	0	1	0	0	0	0	0	33	0	1	1
17	MF	(England) Jermaine Wright	3	0	0	0	1	0	0	0	4	0	0	0
18	MF	(England) Joe Martin	15	0	0	0	1	0	0	0	16	0	1	0
19	FW	(England) Steve Kabba	17	2	0	0	0	0	0	0	17	2	1	0
19	FW	(Hungary) Krisztián Németh	1	0	0	0	0	0	0	0	1	0	0	0
19	FW	(England) Wade Small	5	1	0	0	0	0	0	0	5	1	1	0
20	FW	(England) Nick Blackman	5	1	0	0	0	0	0	0	5	1	0	0
20	MF	(Guinea) Mo Camara	14	0	0	0	0	0	0	0	14	0	4	0
20	MF	(England) Kyel Reid	7	0	0	0	0	0	0	0	7	0	2	0
21	GK	(England) Matt Gilks	5	0	0	0	1	0	0	0	6	0	0	0
22	MF	(England) Graeme Owens	8	0	0	0	0	0	0	0	8	0	0	0
22	DF	(Pakistan) Zesh Rehman	3	0	0	0	1	0	0	0	4	0	0	0
23	FW	(Wales) Daniel Nardiello	2	0	1	0	0	0	0	0	3	0	0	0
24	DF	(Wales) Rob Edwards	36	2	0	0	1	0	0	0	37	2	4	0
25	DF	(England) Shaun Barker	43	0	1	0	0	0	0	0	44	0	8	0
26	MF	(Scotland) Charlie Adam	13	2	0	0	0	0	0	0	13	2	5	1
26	MF	(England) Sone Aluko	1	0	0	0	1	0	0	0	2	0	0	0
26	MF	(Scotland) Alan Gow	17	5	0	0	0	0	0	0	17	5	2	0
27	FW	(Republic of Ireland) Ben Burgess	29	6	0	0	0	0	0	0	29	6	1	0
28	MF	(Republic of Ireland) Alan Mahon	1	0	0	0	0	0	0	0	1	0	1	0
28	MF	(England) Paul Marshall	2	0	0	0	0	0	0	0	2	0	0	0
28	MF	(Canada) Michael D'Agostino	0	0	0	0	0	0	0	0	0	0	0	0
29	MF	(England) Matty Kay	0	0	0	0	0	0	0	0	0	0	0	0
31	FW	(England) Danny Mitchley	2	0	0	0	0	0	0	0	2	0	0	0
33	FW	(England) Dominic Merella	0	0	1	0	0	0	0	0	1	0	0	0
33	FW	(England) Brett Ormerod	15	2	0	0	0	0	0	0	15	2	3	0
34	MF	(England) Lee Hendrie	6	0	0	0	0	0	0	0	6	0	2	1
34	MF	(Belgium) Francesco Carratta	0	0	0	0	0	0	0	0	0	0	0	0
35	FW	(England) Liam Dickinson	7	4	0	0	0	0	0	0	7	4	1	0
35	FW	(England) Lee Hughes	3	1	0	0	0	0	0	0	3	1	0	0
36	GK	(Republic of Ireland) Graham Stack	0	0	0	0	0	0	0	0	0	0	0	0
37	DF	(Republic of Ireland) Ian Harte	4	0	1	0	0	0	0	0	5	0	1	0
37	MF	(England) Simon Walton	1	0	0	0	0	0	0	0	1	0	0	0
Discipline totals													77	6

- Players used: 44
- Goals scored: 46

== Transfers ==
=== Transfers in ===
Date	Pos.	Nat.	Name	From	Fee	Ref.
26 June 2008	GK	(England)	Matt Gilks	Norwich City	Included in part-exchange deal for Wes Hoolahan	
1 July 2008	CB	(England)	Alex Baptiste	Mansfield Town	Undisclosed	
1 July 2008	CB	(England)	Marlon Broomes	Free agency	—	
2 July 2008	LB	(England)	Joe Martin	Tottenham Hotspur	Undisclosed	
11 July 2008	CM	(England)	Jermaine Wright	Free agency	—	
30 July 2008	CF	(Wales)	Daniel Nardiello	Queens Park Rangers	Included in part-exchange deal for Kaspars Gorkšs	
4 August 2008	CM	(Wales)	David Vaughan	Real Sociedad	£200,000	
6 August 2008	CB	(Wales)	Rob Edwards	Wolverhampton Wanderers	Undisclosed	
30 January 2009	CF	(England)	Brett Ormerod	Free agency	—	
2 February 2009	CM	(Belgium)	Francesco Carratta	Free agency	—	

=== Loans in ===
Date	Pos.	Nat.	Name	From	Until	Ref.
11 July 2008	CF	(England)	Steve Kabba	Watford	31 December 2009	
19 July 2008	W	(England)	Adam Hammill	Liverpool	30 December 2008	
31 July 2008	CB	(Pakistan)	Zesh Rehman	Queens Park Rangers	31 December 2008	
5 August 2008	LB	(Guinea)	Mo Camara	Derby County	30 August 2008	
8 August 2008	CF	(England)	Sone Aluko	Birmingham City	1 September 2008	
1 September 2008	CF	(Scotland)	Alan Gow	Rangers	31 December 2008	
16 November 2008	CM	(England)	Lee Hendrie	Sheffield United	31 December 2008	
27 November 2008	CF	(England)	Liam Dickinson	Derby County	30 December 2008	
27 November 2008	W	(England)	Kyel Reid	West Ham United	30 December 2008	
27 November 2008	GK	(Republic of Ireland)	Graham Stack	Plymouth Argyle	31 December 2008	
8 January 2009	CF	(England)	DJ Campbell	Leicester City	31 May 2009	
9 January 2009	CF	(Republic of Ireland)	Roy O'Donovan	Sunderland	31 May 2009	
26 January 2009	CF	(Hungary)	Krisztián Németh	Liverpool	26 February 2009	
29 January 2009	CM	(England)	Paul Marshall	Manchester City	28 February 2009	
2 February 2009	CM	(Scotland)	Charlie Adam	Rangers	31 May 2009	
3 March 2009	CF	(England)	Nick Blackman	Blackburn Rovers	3 April 2009	
13 March 2009	CF	(England)	Wade Small	Sheffield Wednesday	13 April 2009	
17 March 2009	LM	(Republic of Ireland)	Alan Mahon	Burnley	31 May 2009	
26 March 2009	CF	(England)	Lee Hughes	Oldham Athletic	31 May 2009	
26 March 2009	CM	(England)	Simon Walton	Plymouth Argyle	31 May 2009	

=== Transfers out ===
Date	Pos.	Nat.	Name	To	Fee	Ref.
7 May 2008	LM	(England)	Marcus Bean	Free agency	—	
7 May 2008	GK	(England)	Kyle Clancy	Free agency	—	
7 May 2008	CB	(England)	Phil Doughty	Free agency	—	
7 May 2008	GK	(England)	Lewis Edge	Free agency	—	
7 May 2008	CM	(Wales)	Michael Flynn	Free agency	—	
7 May 2008	LB	(England)	John Hills	Free agency	—	
7 May 2008	CB	(England)	Michael Jackson	Free agency	—	
7 May 2008	CF	(England)	Phil Marsh	Free agency	—	
7 May 2008	CM	(England)	Matt Lawlor	Free agency	—	
7 May 2008	CF	(Scotland)	Keigan Parker	Free agency	—	
7 May 2008	LB	(Republic of Ireland)	Paul Tierney	Free agency	—	
7 May 2008	LM	(Scotland)	Andy Welsh	Free agency	—	
7 May 2008	RM	(England)	Simon Wiles	Free agency	—	
26 June 2008	AM	(Republic of Ireland)	Wes Hoolahan	Norwich City	Undisclosed + Matt Gilks	
28 July 2008	CB	(Latvia)	Kaspars Gorkšs	Queens Park Rangers	£250,000 + Daniel Nardiello + Zesh Rehman (loan)	
9 August 2008	CF	(England)	Andy Morrell	Bury	—	
16 December 2008	RB	(Canada)	Michael D'Agostino	Free agency	—	
1 January 2009	CM	(England)	Dominic Merella	Free agency	—	
2 February 2009	CM	(Republic of Ireland)	Ian Harte	Free agency	—	

=== Loans out ===
Date	Pos.	Nat.	Name	To	Until	Ref.
17 October 2008	AM	(England)	Matty Kay	Fleetwood Town	30 December 2008	
14 November 2008	RW	(England)	Stuart Green	Crewe Alexandra	31 May 2009	
21 November 2008	GK	(England)	Matt Gilks	Shrewsbury Town	21 December 2008	
26 January 2009	CB	(England)	Marlon Broomes	Crewe Alexandra	6 March 2009	
29 January 2009	CF	(Wales)	Daniel Nardiello	Hartlepool United	31 May 2009	
13 March 2009	CB	(England)	Marlon Broomes	Crewe Alexandra	2 May 2009	
27 March 2009	CF	(England)	Danny Mitchley	Southport	31 May 2009	
