= List of English football transfers winter 2008–09 =

This is a list of English football transfers for the 2008–09 winter transfer window. Only moves featuring at least one Premier League or Championship club are listed.

The winter transfer window opened on 1 January 2009, although a few transfers took place prior to that date. The window was originally going to close at 00:00 GMT on 1 February 2009, but it was extended to 17:00 GMT on 2 February 2009 because 31 January fell on a Saturday. However, due to snowy conditions, the Premier League allowed some transfers to be completed after that time, provided that the clubs involved could prove that a deal had been agreed in principle and that the snow had caused the delay in the transfer. Players without a club could join one at any time, either during or in between transfer windows. Clubs below Premier League level could also sign players on loan at any time. If need be, clubs could sign a goalkeeper on an emergency loan, if all others were unavailable.

== Transfers ==
Date	Name	Moving from	Moving to	Fee
2 September 2008	David Di Michele	Torino	West Ham United	Loan
2 September 2008	Hérita Ilunga	Toulouse	West Ham United	Loan
2 September 2008	Émile Mpenza	Unattached	Plymouth Argyle	Free
2 September 2008	James Waite	Unattached	Doncaster Rovers	Free
5 September 2008	Walter Alberto López	Unattached	West Ham United	Free
9 September 2008	Frank Fielding	Blackburn Rovers	Northampton Town	Loan
9 September 2008	Rostyn Griffiths	Blackburn Rovers	Accrington Stanley	Loan
9 September 2008	Dan Smith	Plymouth Argyle	Morecambe	Loan
10 September 2008	Damiano Tommasi	Unattached	Queens Park Rangers	Free
11 September 2008	Joe Anyinsah	Preston North End	Brighton & Hove Albion	Loan
11 September 2008	Karl Hawley	Preston North End	Northampton Town	Loan
11 September 2008	Donal McDermott	Manchester City	Milton Keynes Dons	Loan
11 September 2008	Gabriel Zakuani	Fulham	Peterborough United	Loan
12 September 2008	Robbie Fowler	Unattached	Blackburn Rovers	Free
12 September 2008	Jack Jeffery	West Ham United	Leyton Orient	Loan
12 September 2008	Jordan Rhodes	Ipswich Town	Rochdale	Loan
15 September 2008	Scott Murray	Bristol City	Cheltenham Town	Loan
15 September 2008	Jon Stead	Sheffield United	Ipswich Town	Undisclosed
16 September 2008	Richard Kingson	Unattached	Wigan Athletic	Free
18 September 2008	Luke Boden	Sheffield Wednesday	Chesterfield	Loan
18 September 2008	Jennison Myrie-Williams	Bristol City	Carlisle United	Loan
19 September 2008	David Button	Tottenham Hotspur	Grays Athletic	Loan
19 September 2008	Joel Lynch	Brighton & Hove Albion	Nottingham Forest	Loan
19 September 2008	Josh Wright	Charlton Athletic	Brentford	Loan
23 September 2008	Stelios Giannakopoulos	Unattached	Hull City	Free
23 September 2008	Artur Krysiak	Birmingham City	Swansea City	Loan
23 September 2008	Tomi Ameobi	Doncaster Rovers	Grimsby Town	Loan
24 September 2008	Mineiro	Unattached	Chelsea	Free
24 September 2008	Lewis Montrose	Wigan Athletic	Cheltenham Town	Loan
24 September 2008	Josh Payne	West Ham United	Cheltenham Town	Loan
25 September 2008	Andy Barcham	Tottenham Hotspur	Gillingham	Loan
25 September 2008	Craig Beattie	West Bromwich Albion	Crystal Palace	Loan
25 September 2008	Gary Borrowdale	Coventry City	Colchester United	Loan
25 September 2008	Jermaine Easter	Plymouth Argyle	Millwall	Loan
25 September 2008	Adam Federici	Reading	Southend United	Loan
25 September 2008	Matt Ritchie	Portsmouth	Dagenham & Redbridge	Loan
26 September 2008	Nathan Dyer	Southampton	Sheffield United	Loan
26 September 2008	Stuart Fleetwood	Charlton Athletic	Cheltenham Town	Loan
26 September 2008	Jordan Robertson	Sheffield United	Southampton	Loan
26 September 2008	Sam Sodje	Reading	Watford	Loan
26 September 2008	Kevin Thornton	Coventry City	Brighton & Hove Albion	Loan
29 September 2008	Jay McEveley	Derby County	Preston North End	Loan
30 September 2008	Dennis Lawrence	Swansea City	Crewe Alexandra	Loan
30 September 2008	Mark Tyler	Peterborough United	Watford	Loan
30 September 2008	Darren Ward	Wolverhampton Wanderers	Watford	Loan
1 October 2008	Luke Chadwick	Norwich City	Milton Keynes Dons	Loan
1 October 2008	Kevin Kyle	Coventry City	Hartlepool United	Loan
1 October 2008	Leroy Lita	Reading	Norwich City	Loan
2 October 2008	Carlos Edwards	Sunderland	Wolverhampton Wanderers	Loan
2 October 2008	Fraser Forster	Newcastle United	Stockport County	Loan
2 October 2008	Brian Howard	Barnsley	Sheffield United	Loan
2 October 2008	Robbie Savage	Derby County	Brighton & Hove Albion	Loan
3 October 2008	Daniel Jones	Wolverhampton Wanderers	Oldham Athletic	Loan
3 October 2008	Ryan Smith	Millwall	Southampton	Loan
6 October 2008	Eddie Nolan	Blackburn Rovers	Preston North End	Loan
6 October 2008	Simon Thomas	Crystal Palace	Grays Athletic	Loan
7 October 2008	Joe Allen	Swansea City	Wrexham	Loan
8 October 2008	Jarosław Fojut	Bolton Wanderers	Stockport County	Loan
8 October 2008	Tony Kane	Blackburn Rovers	Stockport County	Loan
8 October 2008	Damien McCrory	Plymouth Argyle	Port Vale	Loan
10 October 2008	Graham Kavanagh	Sunderland	Carlisle United	Loan
14 October 2008	Brett Ormerod	Preston North End	Oldham Athletic	Loan
14 October 2008	Diego Tristán	Unattached	West Ham United	Free
16 October 2008	Ben Alnwick	Tottenham Hotspur	Carlisle United	Loan
16 October 2008	Gylfi Sigurðsson	Reading	Shrewsbury Town	Loan
17 October 2008	Lewis Buxton	Stoke City	Sheffield Wednesday	Loan
17 October 2008	Tom Craddock	Middlesbrough	Luton Town	Loan
17 October 2008	Carl Fletcher	Crystal Palace	Nottingham Forest	Loan
17 October 2008	Steve Jones	Burnley	Huddersfield Town	Loan
17 October 2008	Matty Kay	Blackpool	Fleetwood Town	Loan
17 October 2008	Emile Sinclair	Nottingham Forest	Mansfield Town	Loan
17 October 2008	Anthony Stokes	Sunderland	Sheffield United	Loan
20 October 2008	Lee Camp	Queens Park Rangers	Nottingham Forest	Loan
21 October 2008	Simon Church	Reading	Wycombe Wanderers	Loan
21 October 2008	Nigel Quashie	West Ham United	Birmingham City	Loan
24 October 2008	Jamie Annerson	Sheffield United	Rotherham United	Loan
24 October 2008	Stern John	Southampton	Bristol City	Loan
24 October 2008	Dimitrios Konstantopoulos	Coventry City	Swansea City	Loan
24 October 2008	Ryan McGivern	Manchester City	Morecambe	Loan
24 October 2008	Jason Puncheon	Plymouth Argyle	Milton Keynes Dons	Loan
27 October 2008	Wayne Brown	Hull City	Preston North End	Loan
27 October 2008	Nicky Law	Sheffield United	Bradford City	Loan
27 October 2008	Michael Mancienne	Chelsea	Wolverhampton Wanderers	Loan
27 October 2008	Lewis Price	Derby County	Milton Keynes Dons	Loan
27 October 2008	John Welsh	Hull City	Carlisle United	Loan
28 October 2008	Michail Antonio	Tooting & Mitcham United	Reading	Undisclosed
29 October 2008	James Dayton	Crystal Palace	Crawley Town	Loan
30 October 2008	Stuart Fleetwood	Charlton Athletic	Brighton & Hove Albion	Loan
30 October 2008	Alex Pearce	Reading	Southampton	Loan
31 October 2008	Rob Atkinson	Barnsley	Grimsby Town	Loan
31 October 2008	Dean Bowditch	Ipswich Town	Brentford	Loan
31 October 2008	Shelton Martis	West Bromwich Albion	Doncaster Rovers	Loan
31 October 2008	Lewis Neal	Preston North End	Notts County	Loan
3 November 2008	Nicky Hunt	Bolton Wanderers	Birmingham City	Loan
3 November 2008	Tony McMahon	Middlesbrough	Sheffield Wednesday	Loan
3 November 2008	Sam Williams	Aston Villa	Colchester United	Loan
4 November 2008	Nicholas Bignall	Reading	Northampton Town	Loan
5 November 2008	Chris Arthur	Queens Park Rangers	Kettering Town	Loan
5 November 2008	Stephen O'Halloran	Aston Villa	Swansea City	Loan
6 November 2008	Adam Bolder	Queens Park Rangers	Millwall	Loan
6 November 2008	Michael Chopra	Sunderland	Cardiff City	Loan
7 November 2008	Luke Boden	Sheffield Wednesday	Rushden & Diamonds	Loan
7 November 2008	Simon Whaley	Preston North End	Barnsley	Loan
8 November 2008	Scott Wagstaff	Charlton Athletic	Northwich Victoria	Loan
8 November 2008	Rashid Yussuff	Charlton Athletic	Northwich Victoria	Loan
10 November 2008	Darren Ambrose	Charlton Athletic	Ipswich Town	Loan
11 November 2008	Peter Gál-Andrezly	MFK Košice	Middlesbrough	Loan
12 November 2008	Matt Murray	Wolverhampton Wanderers	Hereford United	Loan
13 November 2008	Lee Hills	Crystal Palace	Colchester United	Loan
13 November 2008	Bondz Ngala	West Ham United	Milton Keynes Dons	Loan
13 November 2008	Abu Ogogo	Arsenal	Barnet	Loan
14 November 2008	Darren Byfield	Doncaster Rovers	Oldham Athletic	Loan
14 November 2008	Stuart Green	Blackpool	Crewe Alexandra	Loan
14 November 2008	Michael Liddle	Sunderland	Carlisle United	Loan
14 November 2008	Mark Magee	Bristol City	Stafford Rangers	Loan
14 November 2008	Romone Rose	Queens Park Rangers	Histon	Loan
14 November 2008	Jamie White	Southampton	Shrewsbury Town	Loan
16 November 2008	Lee Hendrie	Sheffield United	Blackpool	Loan
17 November 2008	Martyn Waghorn	Sunderland	Charlton Athletic	Loan
20 November 2008	Jermaine Easter	Plymouth Argyle	Colchester United	Loan
20 November 2008	Kenny Lunt	Sheffield Wednesday	Crewe Alexandra	Loan
20 November 2008	Wayne Routledge	Aston Villa	Cardiff City	Loan
20 November 2008	Mark Wilson	Doncaster Rovers	Tranmere Rovers	Loan
21 November 2008	Matthew Gilks	Blackpool	Shrewsbury Town	Loan
21 November 2008	Tim Krul	Newcastle United	Carlisle United	Loan
21 November 2008	Robert Milsom	Fulham	Southend United	Loan
21 November 2008	Darren Powell	Unattached	Derby County	Free
21 November 2008	David Stockdale	Fulham	Rotherham United	Loan
24 November 2008	Keith Gillespie	Sheffield United	Charlton Athletic	Loan
24 November 2008	John Johnson	Middlesbrough	Tranmere Rovers	Loan
24 November 2008	Andy Todd	Derby County	Northampton Town	Loan
25 November 2008	Jonathan Brown	Cardiff City	Wrexham	Loan
25 November 2008	Jordan Spence	West Ham United	Leyton Orient	Loan
25 November 2008	Gabriel Zakuani	Fulham	Peterborough United	Undisclosed
26 November 2008	Gary Borrowdale	Coventry City	Queens Park Rangers	Loan
27 November 2008	Chris Birchall	Coventry City	Carlisle United	Loan
27 November 2008	Liam Bridcutt	Chelsea	Watford	Loan
27 November 2008	Steve Brooker	Bristol City	Doncaster Rovers	Loan
27 November 2008	Deon Burton	Sheffield Wednesday	Charlton Athletic	Loan
27 November 2008	Jamie Cureton	Norwich City	Barnsley	Loan
27 November 2008	Mark Davies	Wolverhampton Wanderers	Leicester City	Loan
27 November 2008	Liam Dickinson	Derby County	Blackpool	Loan
27 November 2008	Mitchell Hanson	Derby County	Notts County	Loan
27 November 2008	Heiðar Helguson	Bolton Wanderers	Queens Park Rangers	Loan
27 November 2008	Shane Higgs	Cheltenham Town	Wolverhampton Wanderers	Loan
27 November 2008	Craig Mahon	Wigan Athletic	Accrington Stanley	Loan
27 November 2008	Steve Jones	Burnley	Bradford City	Loan
27 November 2008	Kyel Reid	West Ham United	Blackpool	Loan
27 November 2008	Kurt Robinson	Ipswich Town	Northampton Town	Loan
27 November 2008	Bartosz Ślusarski	West Bromwich Albion	Sheffield Wednesday	Loan
27 November 2008	Junior Stanislas	West Ham United	Southend United	Loan
27 November 2008	Graham Stack	Plymouth Argyle	Blackpool	Loan
27 November 2008	Luke Varney	Charlton Athletic	Derby County	Loan
27 November 2008	Jimmy Walker	West Ham United	Colchester United	Loan
27 November 2008	Chris Weale	Bristol City	Hereford United	Loan
27 November 2008	Nathaniel Wedderburn	Stoke City	Notts County	Loan
27 November 2008	Ron-Robert Zieler	Manchester United	Northampton Town	Loan
28 November 2008	Shane White	Plymouth Argyle	Truro City	Loan
1 December 2008	Ashley Barnes	Plymouth Argyle	Eastbourne Borough	Loan
1 December 2008	Dan Smith	Plymouth Argyle	Eastbourne Borough	Loan
2 December 2008	Keith Fahey	St Patrick's Athletic	Birmingham City	Undisclosed
9 December 2008	Mikkel Andersen	Reading	Brentford	Loan
9 December 2008	Jamie Annerson	Sheffield United	Mansfield Town	Loan
9 December 2008	Carl Cort	Unattached	Norwich City	Free
12 December 2008	Ian Harte	Unattached	Blackpool	Free
23 December 2008	Maynor Figueroa	Olimpia	Wigan Athletic	Undisclosed
30 December 2008	Nadir Belhadj	Lens	Portsmouth	£4.4m
31 December 2008	Luke Chadwick	Norwich City	Milton Keynes Dons	Free
31 December 2008	Gavin Hoyte	Arsenal	Watford	Loan
31 December 2008	Dag Alexander Olsen	Tottenham Hotspur	Valencia	Free
31 December 2008	Jay Simpson	Arsenal	West Bromwich Albion	Loan
1 January 2009	Jean-François Christophe	Portsmouth	Southend United	Undisclosed
1 January 2009	Jack Cork	Chelsea	Watford	Loan
1 January 2009	Lassana Diarra	Portsmouth	Real Madrid	£20m
1 January 2009	David Gray	Manchester United	Plymouth Argyle	Loan
1 January 2009	Joss Labadie	West Bromwich Albion	Shrewsbury Town	Loan
2 January 2009	Andy Barcham	Tottenham	Gillingham	Free
2 January 2009	Gary Borrowdale	Coventry City	Queens Park Rangers	Undisclosed
2 January 2009	Adam Chapman	Sheffield United	Oxford United	Loan
2 January 2009	Nathan Dyer	Southampton	Swansea City	Loan
2 January 2009	Heiðar Helguson	Bolton Wanderers	Queens Park Rangers	Undisclosed
2 January 2009	Artur Krysiak	Birmingham City	Motherwell	Loan
2 January 2009	Lee Molyneux	Everton	Southampton	Free
2 January 2009	TJ Moncur	Fulham	Wycombe Wanderers	Free
2 January 2009	Eddie Nolan	Blackburn Rovers	Preston North End	Undisclosed
2 January 2009	Tristan Plummer	Bristol City	Torquay United	Loan
2 January 2009	Wayne Routledge	Aston Villa	Queens Park Rangers	Undisclosed
2 January 2009	Ben Sahar	Chelsea	De Graafschap	Loan
2 January 2009	Robin Shroot	Wimbledon	Birmingham City	Nominal
2 January 2009	Ryan Smith	Millwall	Southampton	Free
2 January 2009	Peter Štyvar	MŠK Žilina	Bristol City	Undisclosed
2 January 2009	Zoran Tošić	Partizan	Manchester United	Undisclosed
2 January 2009	Joe Widdowson	West Ham United	Grimsby Town	Loan
2 January 2009	Sam Williamson	Manchester City	Wrexham	Free
3 January 2009	Wayne Bridge	Chelsea	Manchester City	Undisclosed
3 January 2009	Hugo Colace	Newell's Old Boys	Barnsley	Undisclosed
5 January 2009	Sam Hewson	Manchester United	Hereford United	Loan
5 January 2009	Seb Hines	Middlesbrough	Derby County	Loan
5 January 2009	Lewis Montrose	Wigan Athletic	Cheltenham Town	Loan
6 January 2009	Charlie Daniels	Tottenham Hotspur	Leyton Orient	Free
6 January 2009	Frank Fielding	Blackburn Rovers	Rochdale	Loan
6 January 2009	Graeme Murty	Reading	Charlton Athletic	Loan
6 January 2009	Marvin Pourie	Liverpool	Schalke 04	Undisclosed
6 January 2009	Scott Sinclair	Chelsea	Birmingham City	Loan
7 January 2009	Jonathan Grounds	Middlesbrough	Norwich City	Loan
7 January 2009	Brian Howard	Barnsley	Sheffield United	Undisclosed
7 January 2009	Miguel Mostto	Barnsley	Total Chalaco	Undisclosed
7 January 2009	Arsenio Halfhuid	Excelsior	Aston Villa	Undisclosed
8 January 2009	Lee Baker	West Bromwich Albion	Kidderminster Harriers	Loan
8 January 2009	Hamer Bouazza	Fulham	Birmingham City	Loan
8 January 2009	D. J. Campbell	Leicester City	Blackpool	Loan
8 January 2009	Chris Casement	Ipswich Town	Wycombe Wanderers	Loan
8 January 2009	Lee Cook	Fulham	Queens Park Rangers	Undisclosed
8 January 2009	Ritchie De Laet	Stoke City	Manchester United	Undisclosed
8 January 2009	Stuart Elliot	Doncaster Rovers	Grimsby Town	Loan
8 January 2009	Matthew Etherington	West Ham United	Stoke City	£2m
8 January 2009	Graeme Owens	Middlesbrough	Blackpool	Loan
8 January 2009	Dean Sinclair	Charlton Athletic	Grimsby Town	Loan
8 January 2009	Jake Thomson	Southampton	Bournemouth	Loan
8 January 2009	Rhoys Wiggins	Crystal Palace	Bournemouth	Loan
9 January 2009	Joe Anyinsah	Preston North End	Carlisle United	Undisclosed
9 January 2009	Lee Bowyer	West Ham United	Birmingham City	Loan
9 January 2009	Chris Burke	Rangers	Cardiff City	Free
9 January 2009	Mark Davies	Wolverhampton Wanderers	Leicester City	Loan
9 January 2009	Jermain Defoe	Portsmouth	Tottenham Hotspur	£15m
9 January 2009	Michael Gray	Wolverhampton Wanderers	Sheffield Wednesday	Loan
9 January 2009	Graham Kavanagh	Sunderland	Carlisle United	Free
9 January 2009	Roy O'Donovan	Sunderland	Blackpool	Loan
9 January 2009	Sébastien Puygrenier	Zenit St. Petersburg	Bolton Wanderers	Loan
9 January 2009	Lee Trundle	Bristol City	Leeds United	Loan
9 January 2009	Nathaniel Wedderburn	Stoke City	Notts County	Loan
9 January 2009	Dean Windass	Hull City	Oldham Athletic	Loan
11 January 2009	Kevin-Prince Boateng	Tottenham Hotspur	Borussia Dortmund	Loan
12 January 2009	James Beattie	Sheffield United	Stoke City	Undisclosed
12 January 2009	Nick Blackman	Macclesfield Town	Blackburn Rovers	Undisclosed
12 January 2009	Leigh Bromby	Watford	Sheffield United	Loan
12 January 2009	Sherjill MacDonald	West Bromwich Albion	Roeselare	Loan
12 January 2009	Guðlaugur Victor Pálsson	Aarhus	Liverpool	Free
12 January 2009	Jason Puncheon	Plymouth Argyle	Milton Keynes Dons	Loan
12 January 2009	Jimmy Walker	West Ham United	Colchester United	Loan
12 January 2009	Ross Wallace	Sunderland	Preston North End	Undisclosed
14 January 2009	Luke Ashworth	Wigan Athletic	Leyton Orient	Free
14 January 2009	Nicholas Bignall	Reading	Cheltenham Town	Loan
14 January 2009	Seol Ki-Hyeon	Fulham	Al-Hilal	Loan
15 January 2009	Tomi Ameobi	Doncaster Rovers	Mansfield Town	Loan
15 January 2009	Carl Dickinson	Stoke City	Leeds United	Loan
15 January 2009	Marc-Antoine Fortuné	Nancy	West Bromwich Albion	Loan
15 January 2009	Gaël Givet	Marseille	Blackburn Rovers	Loan
15 January 2009	Lewis Gobern	Wolverhampton Wanderers	Colchester United	Loan
15 January 2009	Liam Henderson	Watford	Hartlepool United	Loan
15 January 2009	Kevin Kilbane	Wigan Athletic	Hull City	Undisclosed
15 January 2009	Izale McLeod	Charlton Athletic	Millwall	Loan
15 January 2009	Liam Miller	Sunderland	Queens Park Rangers	Undisclosed
15 January 2009	Richard Naylor	Ipswich Town	Leeds United	Loan
15 January 2009	Darren Potter	Wolverhampton Wanderers	Sheffield Wednesday	Loan
15 January 2009	Kyel Reid	West Ham United	Wolverhampton Wanderers	Loan
15 January 2009	Emile Sinclair	Nottingham Forest	Macclesfield Town	Loan
15 January 2009	Tom Soares	Stoke City	Charlton Athletic	Loan
15 January 2009	Matthew Spring	Luton Town	Charlton Athletic	Undisclosed
16 January 2009	David Button	Tottenham Hotspur	Bournemouth	Loan
16 January 2009	Tom Cleverley	Manchester United	Leicester City	Loan
16 January 2009	Lee Collins	Wolverhampton Wanderers	Port Vale	Undisclosed
16 January 2009	Ariza Makukula	Benfica	Bolton Wanderers	Loan
16 January 2009	Manucho	Manchester United	Hull City	Loan
16 January 2009	Ryan Shotton	Stoke City	Tranmere Rovers	Loan
16 January 2009	Javan Vidal	Manchester City	Aberdeen	Loan
16 January 2009	Haris Vučkić	Domžale	Newcastle United	Undisclosed
19 January 2009	Craig Bellamy	West Ham United	Manchester City	Undisclosed
19 January 2009	Scott Golbourne	Reading	Oldham Athletic	Loan
19 January 2009	Jay Tabb	Coventry City	Reading	Undisclosed
19 January 2009	Jamie Ward	Chesterfield	Sheffield United	£330k
20 January 2009	Troy Archibald-Henville	Tottenham Hotspur	Exeter City	Loan
20 January 2009	Billy Clarke	Ipswich Town	Northampton Town	Loan
20 January 2009	Jermaine Pennant	Liverpool	Portsmouth	Loan
21 January 2009	Rob Atkinson	Barnsley	Grimsby Town	Free
21 January 2009	Nigel de Jong	Hamburg	Manchester City	Undisclosed
21 January 2009	Wilson Palacios	Wigan Athletic	Tottenham Hotspur	£14m
22 January 2009	Yala Bolasie	Plymouth Argyle	Barnet	Loan
22 January 2009	Stelios Giannakopoulos	Hull City	AEL	Free
22 January 2009	Marlon King	Wigan Athletic	Middlesbrough	Loan
22 January 2009	Nigel Quashie	West Ham United	Wolverhampton Wanderers	Loan
22 January 2009	Paul Rodgers	Arsenal	Northampton Town	Loan
23 January 2009	Lionel Ainsworth	Watford	Huddersfield Town	Undisclosed
23 January 2009	Cédric Avinel	Watford	Gueugnon	Loan
23 January 2009	Oliver Bozanic	Reading	Woking	Loan
23 January 2009	Jimmy Bullard	Fulham	Hull City	£5m
23 January 2009	César Sánchez	Tottenham Hotspur	Valencia	Free
23 January 2009	Emile Heskey	Wigan Athletic	Aston Villa	£3.5m
23 January 2009	Peter Løvenkrands	Unattached	Newcastle United	Free
23 January 2009	Mido	Middlesbrough	Wigan Athletic	Loan
23 January 2009	Jennison Myrie-Williams	Bristol City	Hereford United	Loan
23 January 2009	Jaime Peters	Ipswich Town	Gillingham	Loan
23 January 2009	Jordan Rhodes	Ipswich Town	Brentford	Loan
23 January 2009	Rene Steer	Arsenal	Gillingham	Loan
23 January 2009	Kamil Zayatte	Young Boys	Hull City	£2.5m
24 January 2009	Theo Robinson	Watford	Southend United	Loan
26 January 2009	Daniel Bogdanovic	Lokomotiv Sofia	Barnsley	Undisclosed
26 January 2009	Marlon Broomes	Blackpool	Crewe Alexandra	Loan
26 January 2009	Lewis Buxton	Stoke City	Sheffield Wednesday	Nominal
26 January 2009	Pascal Chimbonda	Sunderland	Tottenham Hotspur	Undisclosed
26 January 2009	Carlo Cudicini	Chelsea	Tottenham Hotspur	Free
26 January 2009	Mark Davies	Wolverhampton Wanderers	Bolton Wanderers	Undisclosed
26 January 2009	Hossam Ghaly	Tottenham Hotspur	Al-Nasr	Undisclosed
26 January 2009	Gordon Greer	Doncaster Rovers	Swindon Town	Loan
26 January 2009	Craig Lindfield	Liverpool	Accrington Stanley	Loan
26 January 2009	Hayden Mullins	West Ham United	Portsmouth	Undisclosed
26 January 2009	Krisztián Németh	Liverpool	Blackpool	Loan
26 January 2009	Savio Nsereko	Brescia	West Ham United	Undisclosed
26 January 2009	Pelé	Porto	Portsmouth	Loan
26 January 2009	Zesh Rehman	Queens Park Rangers	Bradford City	Loan
26 January 2009	Hal Robson-Kanu	Reading	Swindon Town	Loan
26 January 2009	Hugo Rodallega	Necaxa	Wigan Athletic	£4.5m
26 January 2009	Lee Sawyer	Chelsea	Coventry City	Loan
26 January 2009	Ben Watson	Crystal Palace	Wigan Athletic	Undisclosed
26 January 2009	Mike Williamson	Wycombe Wanderers	Watford	Loan
27 January 2009	Jason Jarrett	Preston North End	Brighton & Hove Albion	Free
27 January 2009	Kyle Letheren	Barnsley	Doncaster Rovers	Loan
27 January 2009	Shaun MacDonald	Swansea City	Yeovil Town	Loan
27 January 2009	Aleksandar Prijović	Derby County	Yeovil Town	Loan
28 January 2009	Steve Brooker	Bristol City	Doncaster Rovers	Undisclosed
29 January 2009	Carlo Costly	GKS Bełchatów	Birmingham City	Loan
29 January 2009	Emerse Faé	Reading	Nice	Undisclosed
29 January 2009	Jordan Henderson	Sunderland	Coventry City	Loan
29 January 2009	Kevin Kyle	Coventry City	Kilmarnock	Undisclosed
29 January 2009	Paul Marshall	Manchester City	Blackpool	Loan
29 January 2009	Daniel Nardiello	Blackpool	Hartlepool United	Loan
29 January 2009	John Ruddy	Everton	Crewe Alexandra	Loan
30 January 2009	David Bell	Norwich City	Coventry City	Undisclosed
30 January 2009	Wayne Brown	Hull City	Leicester City	Loan
30 January 2009	Tom Craddock	Middlesbrough	Luton Town	£80k
30 January 2009	El Hadji Diouf	Sunderland	Blackburn Rovers	£2m
30 January 2009	Willo Flood	Cardiff City	Celtic	Undisclosed
30 January 2009	Rui Fonte	Arsenal	Crystal Palace	Loan
30 January 2009	Trésor Kandol	Leeds United	Charlton Athletic	Loan
30 January 2009	Radoslav Kováč	Spartak Moscow	West Ham United	Loan
30 January 2009	Carl Magnay	Chelsea	Milton Keynes Dons	Loan
30 January 2009	Kevin Nolan	Bolton Wanderers	Newcastle United	£4m
30 January 2009	Brett Ormerod	Preston North End	Blackpool	Free
30 January 2009	Gökhan Töre	Bayer Leverkusen	Chelsea	Undisclosed
30 January 2009	Darren Ward	Wolverhampton Wanderers	Charlton Athletic	Loan
30 January 2009	Sam Williams	Aston Villa	Walsall	Loan
31 January 2009	Giles Barnes	Derby County	Fulham	Loan
31 January 2009	Julien Faubert	West Ham United	Real Madrid	Loan
31 January 2009	Chris Killen	Celtic	Norwich City	Loan
31 January 2009	Quincy Owusu-Abeyie	Spartak Moscow	Cardiff City	Loan
31 January 2009	Chris Porter	Motherwell	Derby County	Undisclosed
1 February 2009	Shay Given	Newcastle United	Manchester City	Undisclosed
1 February 2009	Theofanis Gekas	Bayer Leverkusen	Portsmouth	Loan
1 February 2009	Tal Ben Haim	Manchester City	Sunderland	Loan
2 February 2009	Charlie Adam	Rangers	Blackpool	Loan
2 February 2009	Leon Andreasen	Fulham	Hannover	Loan
2 February 2009	Semih Aydilek	Birmingham City	Motherwell	Loan
2 February 2009	Angelos Basinas	AEK Athens	Portsmouth	Undisclosed
2 February 2009	Christophe Berra	Heart of Midlothian	Wolverhampton Wanderers	Undisclosed
2 February 2009	Henri Camara	Wigan Athletic	Stoke City	Loan
2 February 2009	Francesco Carratta	Royal Antwerp	Blackpool	Free
2 February 2009	James Chester	Manchester United	Peterborough United	Loan
2 February 2009	Michael Chopra	Sunderland	Cardiff City	Loan
2 February 2009	Jamie Clarke	Blackburn Rovers	Rotherham United	Free
2 February 2009	Don Cowie	Inverness Caledonian Thistle	Watford	Undisclosed
2 February 2009	Olivier Dacourt	Internazionale	Fulham	Loan
2 February 2009	Calum Davenport	West Ham United	Sunderland	Loan
2 February 2009	Claude Davis	Derby County	Crystal Palace	Loan
2 February 2009	Alan Gow	Rangers	Norwich City	Loan
2 February 2009	Julian Gray	Coventry City	Fulham	Undisclosed
2 February 2009	Michael Gray	Wolverhampton Wanderers	Sheffield Wednesday	Free
2 February 2009	Péter Gulácsi	Liverpool	Hereford United	Loan
2 February 2009	Adam Hammill	Liverpool	Barnsley	Loan
2 February 2009	Khaleem Hyland	Portsmouth	Zulte Waregem	Loan
2 February 2009	Jô	Manchester City	Everton	Loan
2 February 2009	Robbie Keane	Liverpool	Tottenham Hotspur	£12m
2 February 2009	Henri Lansbury	Arsenal	Scunthorpe United	Loan
2 February 2009	Adrian Leijer	Fulham	Norwich City	Loan
2 February 2009	Zoltán Lipták	Újpest	Southampton	Loan
2 February 2009	Arturo Lupoli	Fiorentina	Sheffield United	Loan
2 February 2009	Alex McCarthy	Reading	Aldershot	Loan
2 February 2009	Cody McDonald	Dartford	Norwich City	Undisclosed
2 February 2009	James McPake	Livingston	Coventry City	Undisclosed
2 February 2009	Juan Carlos Menseguez	San Lorenzo de Almagro	West Bromwich Albion	Loan
2 February 2009	Michael Mifsud	Coventry City	Barnsley	Loan
2 February 2009	Youssuf Mulumbu	Paris Saint-Germain	West Bromwich Albion	Loan
2 February 2009	Richard Naylor	Ipswich Town	Leeds United	Free
2 February 2009	Charles N'Zogbia	Newcastle United	Wigan Athletic	Undisclosed
2 February 2009	Tomáš Pekhart	Tottenham Hotspur	Sparta Prague	Loan
2 February 2009	Ricardo Quaresma	Internazionale	Chelsea	Loan
2 February 2009	Dean Shiels	Hibernian	Doncaster Rovers	Undisclosed
2 February 2009	Jimmy Smith	Chelsea	Leyton Orient	Loan
2 February 2009	Ryan Taylor	Wigan Athletic	Newcastle United	Undisclosed
2 February 2009	Andranik Teymourian	Fulham	Barnsley	Loan
2 February 2009	Jared Wilson	Birmingham City	Chesterfield	Loan
3 February 2009	Andrei Arshavin	Zenit St. Petersburg	Arsenal	Undisclosed
3 February 2009	Demar Phillips	Stoke City	Aalesund	Free
4 February 2009	Stephen Kelly	Birmingham City	Stoke City	Loan

- ^1 Player officially joined his new club on 1 January 2009.

== Notes and references ==
- "Transfers - September 2008". BBC Sport. 30 September 2008.
- "Transfers - October 2008". BBC Sport. 31 October 2008.
- "Transfers - November 2008". BBC Sport. 28 November 2008.
- "Transfers - December 2008". BBC Sport. 31 December 2008.
- "Transfers - January 2009". BBC Sport. 31 January 2009.
- "Transfers - February 2009". BBC Sport. 2 February 2009.
