= Mitchley =

Mitchley is a surname. Notable people with the surname include:

- Cyril Mitchley (born 1938), South African cricketer, umpire and referee
- Danny Mitchley (born 1989), British footballer
