= Dominic Merella =

English footballer (born 1989)

Personal information
- Date of birth: 31 December 1989 (age 36)
- Place of birth: Chorley, Lancashire, England
- Position: Midfielder

Team information
- Current team: Jerez Industrial CF

Youth career
- 2005–2007: Blackpool

Senior career*
Years	Team	Apps	(Gls)
2008–2009	Blackpool	0	(0)
2009	Burscough	1	(0)
2009	Weymouth	7	(0)
2009	Burscough	4	(1)
- Jerez Industrial CF
- * Club domestic league appearances and goals as of 17:09, 18 April 2010 (UTC)

Dominic Merella (born 31 December 1989) is an English professional footballer for Jerez Industrial CF. He is a midfielder who can also play as a striker.

== Career ==
Merella was highly regarded at Blackpool where he was a product of the club's Centre of Excellence, in which he became a regular starter for the youth team in the Football League Youth Alliance, North West Conference.

In the 2005–06 season, Merella was part of the Lancashire County Schools FA team that won the English Schools' Football Association Premier League Under-16 Inter County Trophy. In the semi-final held at Victoria Park, Burscough, he helped Lancashire beat Leicestershire & Rutland County Schools FA 3–1. They then beat Devon County Schools FA 2–1 in the final, which was held at Ewood Park in Blackburn on 11 May 2006.

In the 2007–08 season, he was part of the Blackpool youth team that won the Lancashire FA Youth Cup. In the summer of 2008, he was included in the club's pre-season tour to Latvia in July, where he impressed with some solid displays. He also played in most of the club's other pre-season games. On 23 July 2008, he signed his first professional contract, for six months.

Merella became a regular in Blackpool's reserve team in The Central League in the 2008–09 season.

In November 2008, it was revealed that Blackpool were willing to let Merella go out on loan in order for him to get some first-team experience, after he continued to impress for the club's reserve team.

Merella made his debut for Blackpool on 3 January 2009, as a second-half substitute in their 1–0 FA Cup defeat to Conference National club Torquay United. However, in late January he was released by Blackpool.

In early February Merella joined League Two club Bournemouth on trial, trying to earn a contract. After briefly joining Conference North club Burscough, in late March he joined Conference National club Weymouth. He made his debut in a home 2–0 defeat to Barrow at the Wessex Stadium on 29 March. He left Weymouth in April 2009, as they were relegated to the Conference South.
