= DJ Campbell =

English footballer (born 1981)

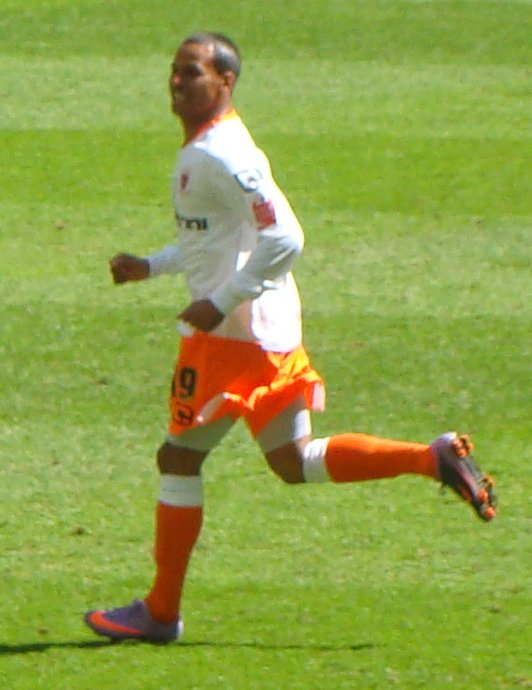
- Campbell playing for Blackpool in the 2010 Championship play-off final at Wembley Stadium

Personal information
- Full name: Dudley Junior Campbell
- Date of birth: 12 November 1981 (age 45)
- Place of birth: Hammersmith, England
- Height: 5 ft 10 in (1.78 m)
- Position: Forward

Youth career
- –2000: Aston Villa

Senior career*
Years	Team	Apps	(Gls)
2000–2001	Chesham United	29	(16)
2001–2003	Stevenage Borough	25	(3)
2002	→ Billericay Town (loan)	5	(2)
2003–2005	Yeading	88	(65)
2005–2006	Brentford	23	(9)
2006–2007	Birmingham City	43	(9)
2007–2010	Leicester City	41	(5)
2009	→ Blackpool (loan)	20	(9)
2009–2010	→ Derby County (loan)	8	(3)
2010	→ Blackpool (loan)	15	(8)
2010–2011	Blackpool	31	(13)
2011–2013	Queens Park Rangers	11	(1)
2012–2013	→ Ipswich Town (loan)	17	(10)
2013	→ Blackburn Rovers (loan)	7	(0)
2013–2014	Blackburn Rovers	7	(0)
2014	→ Millwall (loan)	9	(2)
2014–2015	Maidenhead United	9	(4)
Total		386	(159)

International career
2004–2005	England C	2	(0)
- * Club domestic league appearances and goals

Dudley Junior Campbell (born 12 November 1981) is an English former professional footballer who played as a forward.

Campbell's early career was in non-League football between 2000 and 2005, during which time he was capped by England C. Following a successful spell at Yeading he then moved into the Football League with Brentford. Campbell then went on to play in the Premier League for Birmingham City, Blackpool and Queens Park Rangers, and in the Football League for Birmingham, Leicester City, Blackpool, Derby County, Ipswich Town, Blackburn Rovers and Millwall.

== Club career ==
=== Early career ===
Born in London, Campbell started his career at Aston Villa as a trainee, but was not offered a professional contract. In 2000, he moved into non-league football with Isthmian League Premier Division club Chesham United, scoring sixteen goals in 29 league appearances and forging a notable partnership with journeyman Peter Mallorie.

On 20 May 2001 he signed for Conference National club Stevenage Borough. He made his debut on 21 August, scoring both goals in a 2–0 win over Hayes at Church Road, Hayes.

In August 2002 Campbell was placed on the transfer list at his own request in order to gain regular first-team football, with club chairman Phill Wallace saying, "He's a very talented lad, and has every chance of playing higher so we won't let him go unless the terms are right for us." In September 2002 he was loaned to Billericay Town of the Isthmian League Premier Division, making his debut for them on 24 September in a 0–0 draw with Purfleet. In two years at Stevenage, Campbell made 23 league appearances, scoring three goals.

On 4 February 2003 he moved to Yeading, who were then in the Isthmian League Division One North, on a free transfer. He had a successful spell at Yeading, scoring 83 goals in a total of 109 appearances in all competitions. He helped the club win promotion as champions of Division One North in the 2002–03 season. His skills were showcased in the 2004–05 FA Cup against Newcastle United on 9 January 2005, a game which was televised on BBC One. Later that season he won the Isthmian League Premier Division championship with Yeading.

=== Brentford ===
At the end of the season, on 7 June 2005, Brentford manager Martin Allen signed him for the League One club for £5,000 on a one-year contract, with an option to extend it. He scored on his debut, a 2–0 home win over Scunthorpe United on 6 August 2005.

On 28 January 2006 Campbell scored two goals to lead Brentford to a 2–1 victory over Premier League club Sunderland in the fourth round of the FA Cup. He made a total of 28 appearances for Brentford, scoring twelve times in his seven months at the club. He was also named the League One Player of the Month for January 2006, after he scored five goals in his final four league games and three goals in two FA Cup games for The Bees.

=== Birmingham City ===
On 31 January 2006, Campbell was sold to Premier League club Birmingham City for £500,000, the fee potentially doubling depending on the player's appearances and achievements with the club. He signed a three-and-a-half-year contract with The Blues.

He made his Premier League debut as a substitute on 4 February 2006, playing the final twenty minutes in a 2–0 defeat to Arsenal. The club were relegated at the end of the season, and Campbell scored his first goal for them in a 2–1 win over Colchester United on 5 August 2006 in the Championship. On 25 November he scored with his first touch of the ball after coming on as an 82nd-minute substitute to give The Blues a 2–1 win over Burnley at Turf Moor.

On 1 April 2007, after being included in the squad due to an injury to the club's new loan signing Andy Cole, he scored twice as a substitute as they beat local rivals Coventry City 3–0. Manager Steve Bruce stated, "I made a big mistake by leaving him out of the 16 and I had to admit that to him and apologise to him for that. He keeps knocking on the door and I'm obviously going to have to put him right in my thoughts again."

Campbell started 25 games for The Blues that season, scoring 12 goals in all competitions as they were promoted back to the Premier League.

=== Leicester City ===
On 20 July 2007, Campbell signed a four-year contract with Championship club Leicester City for an initial fee of £1.6 million, which could have risen to £2.1 million, reportedly beating off competition from Watford for his signature. In his column on BBC Sport, Ian Holloway, then-manager of Plymouth Argyle, described the fee as "absolute madness". Three months later, he went on to manage Campbell at Leicester, and again at Blackpool.

"When DJ Campbell goes for £2m – and really he's only played in Birmingham City's reserves and Brentford's first team – it's absolute madness."

— Ian Holloway, BBC Online

Leicester were relegated at the end of the season after Campbell had made a total of 32 league appearances, scoring four league goals. He also netted in a 4–3 away defeat to Chelsea in a League Cup match on 31 October 2007. He was sidelined through injury in November 2007, suffering from osteitis pubis for three months.

==== Loan deals ====
After struggling to get a regular place in the first team in League One, on 8 January 2009 Campbell signed for Championship club Blackpool on loan until the end of the 2008–09 season. He scored on his debut, in a 2–1 away defeat to Coventry City on 17 January. He scored again on his home debut on 24 January against his former club Birmingham City in a 2–0 win at Bloomfield Road. After the match, Campbell said, "I'd be lying if I said it didn't mean a lot more scoring against Birmingham. I love Birmingham. They are in my heart. I played for them for two years and had good times there. As you saw, their fans (who chanted Campbell's name at one point) haven't forgotten me which means a lot to me. But right now I am at Blackpool and I am delighted that we got the three points and I'm happy for the club because we deserved it." After scoring his sixth goal for The Seasiders in a 1–1 home draw with Southampton on 21 March, Campbell was named in the Football League's Championship "Team Of The Week". He finished the season as Blackpool's top overall goalscorer with 9 goals.

Campbell attracted the attention of Coventry City, Queens Park Rangers and Blackpool, who were keen to re-sign him. However, no deal was agreed with any club following the close of the transfer window. Stripped of his squad number at the start of the 2009–10 season, Campbell did not make his first senior appearance until 3 October 2009, in a 1–1 draw against Coventry, sporting the number 23 shirt. Prior to making his return, Campbell had told the Blackpool Gazette that he did not want to go back to Leicester. He later strenuously denied he ever meant to cause any offence, saying, "All I said was I had no future."

Campbell joined Derby County on a month-long loan on 26 November 2009. He marked his debut for The Rams by coming off the bench to score a 94th-minute equaliser in a 2–2 home draw against West Bromwich Albion. On completion of the loan, Derby extended the deal for a further month. He earned a place in the Championship "Team of the Week" for 18 January 2010 when he scored a double in a 3–0 win away to Peterborough United.

On 1 February, Campbell re-joined Blackpool, on loan until the end of the 2009–10 season. He would again be managed by Ian Holloway. He described the move as fate saying, '"It's odd but I was watching the Beeb's show last Saturday night, and the bit where the lady was reading out the e-mails. For some reason my mate said 'just go back to Blackpool', and then I said I wanted to. Then at that exact moment, the lady on the TV said they had just had an e-mail from a guy in Blackpool saying 'sign DJ Campbell'. The way that happened was crazy really — fate, I guess. But the people in Blackpool know I love the club." He added: "You just realise when you come to places like this and see good people, you realise how much you do love the game and it makes everything so much easier."

Two days later he made his return to action for The Tangerines in a 2–3 home defeat to West Bromwich Albion. His first goal came on 16 February, in a 2–0 home win over Middlesbrough. On 11 May 2010, Campbell hit his first career hat trick, in a 4–3 away win in the second leg of the play-off semi-final against Nottingham Forest within the space of 25 minutes. The hat-trick helped Blackpool to a 6–4 aggregate victory and secured The Seasiders' position in the play-off final. After Blackpool beat Cardiff City in the final, Campbell expressed his desire to make his move to the seaside permanent. "What happens next? I can't answer that yet but I had a little word with the gaffer after Saturday's game and he wants to sign me. I want to come so it is just a case of hoping Leicester don't do something silly. But everyone in Blackpool knows how much I love the club – I wouldn't have come back otherwise. We'll see what happens during the summer but I have been so happy to be at Blackpool during the second half of the season. I love the club. I love everybody, all the players and the gaffer. I am speechless and just delighted for everyone that we've actually managed to win promotion."

==== Return to Leicester ====
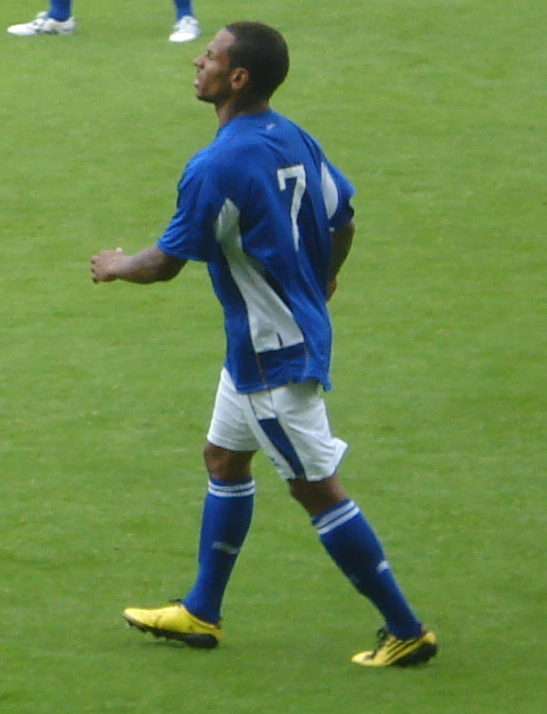
Campbell playing for Leicester City against Oxford United in a pre-season friendly, 24 July 2010

Leicester City's management and coaching staff had changed upon Campbell's return to the club. Impressing new manager Paulo Sousa in pre-season by scoring in five of the six friendly matches played, he described Campbell as "someone who is going to help us a lot this season." He was picked by the BBC as the club's key player for the 2010–11 season. He scored in the opening game of the season, a 3–2 defeat to Crystal Palace on 7 August 2010 but failed to score in his next three games, which proved to be his last for the club.

=== Blackpool ===
On 31 August 2010, Campbell completed a permanent move to Blackpool for an undisclosed fee, which was later reported as being a club record £1.25m. He signed a two-year contract with an option of a further 12 months, claiming he had "unfinished business" at the club. His first game was a friendly to open the new Zemgele Olympic Centre in Jelgava, Latvia against Latvian Higher League side FK Jelgava on 3 September.

He scored in his first league match as a permanent Blackpool player, a 2–0 away win over Newcastle United on 11 September. He went on to score the equaliser against Aston Villa in an eventual 3–2 defeat, then notched another, his third of the campaign, at Stoke City on 11 December with the only goal of the game. He scored both goals in a 2–0 victory at Sunderland, and one in a home defeat by Birmingham City. He netted the match-winner in a home victory over Liverpool and the second against Manchester United in a 3–2 defeat. On 22 February, Campbell helped Blackpool to a 3–1 win over Tottenham Hotspur, winning a penalty for the first goal and scoring the second after being heavily involved in the build-up. Four days later, he was sent off for violent conduct in the first half of Blackpool's 4–0 defeat at Wolves. Campbell ended the season with 13 goals to his name making him Blackpool's top Premier League scorer.

=== Queens Park Rangers ===
On 29 July 2011, Blackpool accepted a bid for Campbell from Queens Park Rangers. On 4 August, he signed a two-year deal with QPR, the club he had supported as a boy. The undisclosed fee was believed to be in the region of £1.2m. He scored his first goal for the club on 17 September, against Woverhampton Wanderers in the Premier League. Campbell's first season for QPR was plagued with injury, resulting in his only being able to start two Premier League games as of 26 February 2012. At the end of the 2012–13 season, QPR confirmed that Campbell would leave the club when his contract expired on 30 June.

==== Ipswich Town (loan) ====
Campbell was loaned to Ipswich Town on 5 October 2012 for three months. In his first game, against Cardiff City, Campbell scored in the 45th minute. He went on to score the only goal in a 1–0 win against Birmingham City on 3 November. By the end of his loan spell, Campbell had scored 10 goals in 17 appearances for Ipswich.

==== Blackburn Rovers (loan) ====
On 8 February 2013, Campbell signed for Football League Championship side Blackburn Rovers on a three-month loan, to run until 12 May. He then broke a bone in his foot and missed the final game of the season against Birmingham City and returned to QPR.

=== Blackburn Rovers ===
On 4 July 2013, Blackburn Rovers announced the signing of Campbell from Queens Park Rangers following his release at the end of the 2012–13 season.

On 9 December 2013, the club confirmed that Campbell was one of six men arrested by the National Crime Agency in connection with allegations of spot-fixing. Campbell was not charged by the NCA and was released on bail until April 2014. The same day, Rovers and their lawyers started talks with Campbell's representatives over the player's future at the club. On 12 December, Campbell was granted time off from the club. Following his return a few days later, Rovers manager Gary Bowyer confirmed that Campbell was available for selection for future matches on the same basis as any other player. He returned to Rovers' matchday squad on Boxing Day, as an unused substitute in a 0–0 draw against Sheffield Wednesday. He was recalled to Blackburn's starting lineup for the visit to Leeds United on 1 January 2014. Campbell left Blackburn Rovers by mutual consent on 1 July 2014.

Campbell was released without charge in August 2014. He had seriously considered quitting football because of the allegations against him.

==== Millwall (loan) ====
On 20 January 2014, Campbell joined Championship side Millwall on loan for the remainder of the 2013–14 season. The loan move reunited Campbell with manager Ian Holloway, for whom Campbell previously played for at Blackpool. On 28 January, Campbell scored on his Millwall debut, helping his new team to a 1–1 draw with Sheffield Wednesday.

=== Maidenhead United ===
On 25 September 2014, Campbell joined Conference South side Maidenhead United. He signed for the club after being jokingly asked to by former mentor Johnson Hippolyte, but Campbell took the offer seriously as he wanted to regain his love for football after being wrongly implicated in a match fixing ring. He was initially only training with the club, but went on to play for free. He made his debut for the club in the FA Cup Second Qualifying Round against Faversham Town, and scored as Maidenhead won the game 4–0.

== International career ==
While a Yeading player, Campbell appeared for the England National Game XI – since renamed England C – the national team that represents England at non-league level.

== Personal life ==
He has formed Pro FC Trials, a series of football camps, with his former manager Martin Allen.

== Career statistics ==
Appearances and goals by club, season and competition
Club	Season	Division	League		FA Cup		League Cup		Other		Total	
Club	Season	Division	Apps	Goals	Apps	Goals	Apps	Goals	Apps	Goals	Apps	Goals
Chesham United	2000–01	Isthmian League Premier Division	24	12	1	0	—		0	0	25	12
Chesham United	2001–02	Isthmian League Premier Division	5	4	—		—		0	0	5	4
Chesham United	Total		29	16	1	0	—		0	0	30	16
Stevenage Borough	2001–02	Conference	21	3	2	0	—		5 (Note: Appearances in FA Trophy.)	2	28	5
Stevenage Borough	2002–03	Conference	2	0	0	0	—		0	0	2	0
Stevenage Borough	Total		23	3	2	0	—		5	2	30	5
Billericay Town (loan)	2002–03	Isthmian League Premier Division	5	2	—		—		—		5	2
Yeading	2003–04	Isthmian League First Division North	42	33	0	0	—		0	0	42	33
Yeading	2004–05	Isthmian League Premier Division	46	32	4	3	—		0	0	50	35
Yeading	Total		88	65	4	3	—		0	0	92	68
Brentford	2005–06	League One	23	9	4	3	1	0	0	0	28	12
Birmingham City	2005–06	Premier League	11	0	—		—		—		11	0
Birmingham City	2006–07	Championship	32	9	3	2	4	1	—		39	12
Birmingham City	Total		43	9	3	2	4	1	—		50	12
Leicester City	2007–08	Championship	28	4	0	0	4	1	—		32	5
Leicester City	2008–09	League One	7	0	1	0	2	0	0	0	10	0
Leicester City	2009–10	Championship	3	0	—		0	0	—		3	0
Leicester City	2010–11	Championship	3	1	0	0	1	0	—		4	1
Leicester City	Total		41	5	1	0	7	1	0	0	49	6
Blackpool (loan)	2008–09	Championship	20	9	—		—		—		20	9
Derby County (loan)	2009–10	Championship	8	3	0	0	—		—		8	3
Blackpool (loan)	2009–10	Championship	15	8	—		—		3 (Note: Appearances in Football League Championships play-offs.)	3	18	11
Blackpool	2010–11	Premier League	31	13	0	0	—		—		31	13
Queens Park Rangers	2011–12	Premier League	11	1	1	0	0	0	—		12	1
Queens Park Rangers	2012–13	Premier League	0	0	2	0	0	0	—		2	0
Queens Park Rangers	Total		11	1	3	0	0	0	—		14	1
Ipswich Town (loan)	2012–13	Championship	17	10	—		—		—		17	10
Blackburn Rovers (loan)	2012–13	Championship	7	0	—		—		—		7	0
Blackburn Rovers	2013–14	Championship	7	0	2	0	0	0	—		9	0
Millwall (loan)	2013–14	Championship	9	2	—		—		—		9	2
Maidenhead United	2014–15	Conference South	9	4	0	0	—		1	0	10	4
Career total			386	159	20	8	12	2	9	5	427	174

== Honours ==
Yeading

- Isthmian League Premier Division: 2004–05
- Isthmian League First Division North: 2003–04
- Middlesex Senior Cup: 2004–05
- Middlesex Senior Charity Cup: 2004–05

Birmingham City

- Football League Championship runner-up: 2006–07

Blackpool

- Football League Championship play-offs: 2010

Individual

- Yeading Player of the Year: 2003–04
- Isthmian League Player of the Year: 2004–05
- Isthmian League First Division North Golden Boot: 2003–04
- Football League One Player of the Month: January 2006
