= Danny Mitchley =

English footballer (born 1989)

Personal information
- Date of birth: 7 October 1989 (age 37)
- Place of birth: Liverpool, England
- Position: Forward

Team information
- Current team: Bootle FC

Youth career
- 2002–2005: Skelmersdale United
- 2005–2006: Oldham Athletic
- 2006: Wigan Athletic
- 2006–2008: Blackpool

Senior career*
Years	Team	Apps	(Gls)
2008–2010	Blackpool	2	(0)
2009	→ Southport (loan)	7	(0)
2009	→ Burscough (loan)	5	(0)
2010	→ Wrexham (loan)	6	(0)
2010	Burscough	1	(0)
2010–2012	Mansfield Town	17	(5)
2011	→ Nuneaton Town (loan)	18	(2)
2012–2013	Altrincham	7	(0)
2012	→ Marine	4	(2)
2013	→ Kendal Town (loan)	11	(10)
2013–2014	Kendal Town	38	(26)
2014–2015	Skelmersdale United	56	(35)
2015–2019	Marine	178	(81)
2019–2020	Radcliffe	10	(1)
2019–2020	→ Witton Albion (loan)	10	(2)
2020–2022	Skelmersdale United		
2022–2024	City of Liverpool		
2024-	Bootle FC		
- * Club domestic league appearances and goals as of 5 December 2024 (UTC)

Daniel Mitchley (born 7 October 1989) is an English footballer who plays as a forward for Bootle FC

== Career ==
=== From youth team to first team at Blackpool ===
Born in Liverpool, Mitchley played at Skelmersdale United until he was 15 years old. He then spent one season with the Oldham Athletic Centre of Excellence, followed by a short spell with Wigan Athletic's Centre of Excellence, before joining Blackpool, where he became a regular starter for the youth team in the Football League Youth Alliance, North West Conference.

By December 2007 Mitchley had scored 25 goals in just twelve matches for Blackpool's youth and reserve teams, and despite only just having turned eighteen, Blackpool manager Simon Grayson stated that he was "not frightened of throwing him into the action if I need to." Mitchley had been training with the first-team squad and had already travelled with them when he was included in the squad that went to Scunthorpe United. Grayson also confirmed that Mitchley would be training with the first team over the Christmas period and that he was close to a first team call up. By February 2008, Mitchley had scored 35 goals for the youth and reserve team in the 2007–08 season. However, he then suffered a broken foot, which kept him out of action for the rest of the season.

On 4 March 2008 Mitchley was offered his first professional contract, together with youth-team captain, Ashton Bayliss. On 6 May he won two awards at the club's annual presentation night: the Blackpool Supporters Association Young Player of the Year, and the Chris Muir Memorial Trophy for Young Player.

He made his return from injury on 15 October 2008 in a reserve-team match at Burnley. He was then included in the Blackpool squad for the first time in the Championship home match against Derby County on 21 October 2008, but was an unused substitute as the Seasiders won 3–2. Four days later, he made his professional debut when he came on as a late second-half substitute in the 89th minute for Gary Taylor-Fletcher at Bloomfield Road in a 2–2 draw with Crystal Palace.

Mitchley started the 2009–10 season with Blackpool and was twice an unused substitute. Firstly in the Seasiders 2–1 League Cup victory over Crewe Alexandra at Gresty Road on 11 August 2009. Then again on 15 August in a 1–1 draw with Cardiff City at Bloomfield Road. Mitchley spent most spells of 2009 and 2010 on loan at various lower league clubs. He was released by Blackpool in June 2010.

==== Loan moves whilst at Blackpool ====
On 27 March 2009, Mitchley signed for Conference North side Southport on loan for the rest of the 2008–09 season. He made his debut as a substitute the following day in the Sandgrounders 3–2 win over Stafford Rangers at Haig Avenue. He made a total of seven league appearances for Southport.

On 18 August 2009 he was loaned out to Northern Premier League side Burscough, along with fellow Blackpool player Mark Halstead. He made his debut on 22 August in a 0–4 home defeat to King's Lynn at Victoria Park. After two more substitute appearances, Mitchley made his full debut on 15 September in a 0–1 home loss to Stocksbridge Park Steels.

On 25 March 2010, Mitchley joined Conference National side Wrexham on a one-month loan deal. He made his debut two days later in a 3–0 win over Histon at the Racecourse Ground.

=== Non-league ===
On 27 October 2010, Burscough announced that they have captured the signing of Mitchley. He had a trial with Mansfield Town prior to him re-joining Burscough. He began his second stint at Burscough with a 3–2 defeat against FC Halifax Town.

Mitchley signed for Mansfield Town in November 2010 and scored on his debut against Forest Green Rovers, however was on the losing side, going down 2–1. He was originally released by Mansfield in May 2011, with still a year left on his contract, however he returned in the pre-season. Mansfield boss Paul Cox stated that Mitchley did not feature in his plans for 2011–12.

He joined Nuneaton Town on loan, and after scoring twice on his debut in the FA Cup, he failed to score again in 18 league appearances. He signed for Altrincham in the summer of 2012. Having struggled to break into the first team at Altrincham with only a handful of first team appearances, he went out on a 1-month loan spell to Marine. After returning to Altrincham, he had a second loan spell, this time at Kendal Town, where he scored on his debut.

Leaving Marine after four seasons, Mitchley moved to Radcliffe FC in the summer 2019. On 20 December 2019, he was loaned out to Witton Albion for one month. The deal was later extended for one mont further and he returned to Radcliffe on 20 February 2020.

In August 2020, he re-signed for Skelmersdale United of the North West Counties Football League, having spent five years away from the club.

== Career statistics ==
As of 27 May 2011

Club performance			League		Cup		League Cup		Total	
Season	Club	League	Apps	Goals	Apps	Goals	Apps	Goals	Apps	Goals
England			League		FA Cup		League Cup		Total	
2008–09	Blackpool	Championship	2	0	0	0	0	0	2	0
2008–09	Southport (loan)	Conference North	7	0	0	0	–		7	0
2009–10	Burscough (loan)	Northern Premier League Premier Division	5	0	0	0	–		5	0
2009–10	Wrexham (loan)	Conference National	1	0	0	0	–		1	0
2010–11	Burscough	Northern Premier League Premier Division	1	0	0	0	–		1	0
2010–11	Mansfield Town	Conference National	17	2	0	3	–		17	2
Career total			33	2	0	5	0	0	33	2

== Honours ==
Blackpool

- Football League Championship play-off winner (1): 2009–10

Mansfield Town

- FA Trophy runner up (1): 2011
- Challenge Cup winner 1): 2015-16
