= Mo Camara =

Guinean footballer (born 1975)

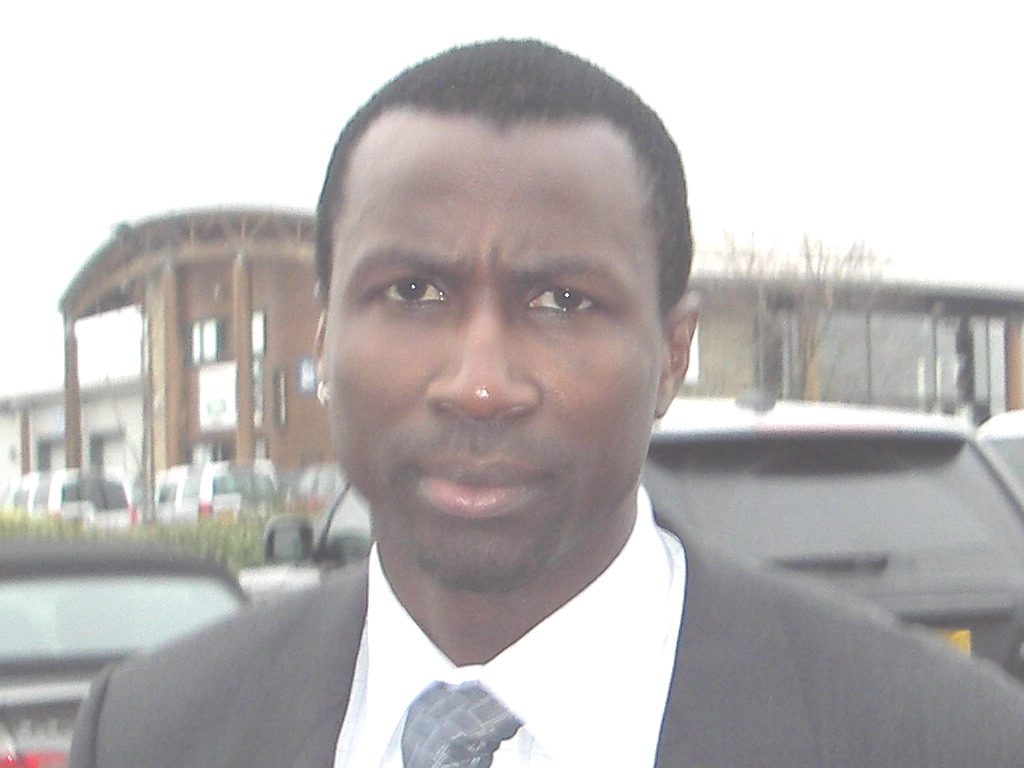

Personal information
- Full name: Mohamed Camara
- Date of birth: 25 June 1975 (age 51)
- Place of birth: Conakry, Guinea
- Height: 1.80 m (5 ft 11 in)
- Position: Full-back

Senior career*
Years	Team	Apps	(Gls)
1993–1997	Beauvais	79	(0)
1996	→ Troyes (loan)	13	(0)
1997–2000	Le Havre	16	(0)
1998–1999	→ Lille (loan)	34	(2)
1999–2000	→ Lille (loan)	9	(0)
2000–2003	Wolverhampton Wanderers	45	(0)
2003–2005	Burnley	90	(0)
2005–2006	Celtic	19	(0)
2006–2009	Derby County	21	(0)
2007–2008	→ Norwich City (loan)	21	(0)
2008	→ Blackpool (loan)	14	(0)
2009–2010	St Mirren	10	(0)
2010	Torquay United	2	(0)
Total		373	(2)

International career
1995–2000	Guinea	20	(0)
- * Club domestic league appearances and goals

Mohamed Camara (born 25 June 1975) is a Guinean former professional footballer who played as a left-back or left midfielder.

Camara began his career with the French football team Beauvais in 1993. He made a total of 79 league appearances for Beauvais, before signing for Le Havre in August 1997. Mid 2000, Camera signed with 1st division Wolverhampton Wanderers where he was a firm fan favourite. Camara joined Burnley in June 2003, then Scottish Premier League side Celtic, followed by Derby in August 2006. In 2009, Camera signed with Scottish Premier League side St Mirren, followed by English League Two side Torquay United until May 2010.

Camara also made 20 appearances for Guinea from 1995 to 2000, and played in two of his country's group stage matches at the 1998 African Cup of Nations held in Burkina Faso. After football, Camara became head of European scouting at Derby County in February 2014.

== Club career ==
=== Early career ===
Born in Conakry, Guinea, Camara spent the early years of his professional career in French football, with Beauvais in 1993, and in 1996 went on loan to Troyes, where he played 13 league games. He made a total of 79 league appearances for Beauvais, before signing for Le Havre in August 1997, where he was sent on loan to Lille.

=== Wolves ===
Camara moved to England in summer 2000 with Wolverhampton Wanderers of the First Division in a £100,000 deal. He became a cult figure amongst their fans, known for his commitment and pace despite sometimes exhibiting a lack of positional sense and ball control. A regular column from the spoof 'Mohammed Camara Appreciation Society' appeared in fanzine 'A Load of Bull' celebrating his eccentric but lovable playing style. He was a regular starter in his first two seasons with the side, but failed to make an appearance during their 2002–03 promotion success following the signing of Denis Irwin and a knee ligament injury.

=== Burnley ===
Camara joined Burnley on a free transfer in June 2003, which gave Camara regular playing time once again. After Steve Cotterill replaced previous manager Stan Ternent, he made the left-back focus on his crossing ability, causing a dramatic up-turn in his form at the beginning of the 2004–05 season. He scored once for Burnley in the League Cup as they memorably knocked out Premier League side Aston Villa in October 2004.

=== Celtic ===
Camara's form attracted interest from Scottish Premier League side Celtic, who he joined at the end of his two-year contract under the Bosman ruling at the end of the season.

After one-to-one sessions with manager Gordon Strachan, Camara started to do well and established himself as a defender in Celtic's first eleven. However, after Ross Wallace was converted into a left-back, Camara was relegated to the bench and made only rare appearances. He fell further down the pecking order after the signing of right-back Mark Wilson, who was also converted to left back.

=== Derby County ===
Despite earlier pledging to fight for his place at Celtic, Camara ending up leaving to join Derby County on a free transfer in August 2006. He was a regular player during the first half of the season, however he found himself out of contention after Derby signed Jay McEveley in the January transfer window. The following season, with the club newly in the Premier League, saw Camara find appearances just as scarce. Despite scoring against Blackpool in the League Cup at the start of the season, he made just one appearance in the top flight, a 6–0 thrashing at Liverpool, before later being loaned to Championship side Norwich City. This was subsequently extended to cover the whole of the 2007–08 campaign.

On 5 August 2008, Camara moved to Derby's Championship rivals Blackpool on loan until 30 August. He made his debut for the Seasiders on 9 August in a 1–0 home defeat to Bristol City. On 9 September the loan was extended for a further month, with manager Simon Grayson saying, "He has done very well for us in the first four league games. He has good energy and experience and he has been a good addition." The loan period was extended for a third and final time on 17 October, keeping him with the Seasiders until 22 November. Upon his return to Derby Camara featured in a FA Cup victory at Forest Green Rovers but was deemed surplus to requirements by new Derby manager Nigel Clough and his contract was cancelled on 2 February 2009.

=== St Mirren ===
After the January 2009 transfer window shut, free agent Camara moved back to Scotland to sign for Scottish Premier League side St Mirren.

=== Torquay United ===
Soon after being released from St Mirren, Camara joined English League Two side Torquay United. Having made his debut in a 2–1 home defeat to Port Vale on 13 February, Camara made his second and final appearance for the Gulls six days later in a match at Rotherham United in which he was substituted at half time. It was finally confirmed by manager Paul Buckle on 24 April that Camara was no longer at the club.

He was released by Torquay on 15 May 2010, along with six other players.

== International career ==
Camara made 20 appearances at full international level for Guinea from 1995 to 2000, and played in two of his country's group stage matches at the 1998 African Cup of Nations held in Burkina Faso.

== After football ==
Camara was made head of European scouting at Derby County in February 2014 and opened a wine bar in Tettenhall, an affluent area of Wolverhampton in 2017.
