= Francesco Carratta =

Belgian footballer

Personal information
- Full name: Francesco Ferdinando Christian Carratta
- Date of birth: 17 August 1987 (age 39)
- Place of birth: Hasselt, Belgium
- Height: 1.82 m (6 ft 0 in)
- Position: Central midfielder

Team information
- Current team: Patro Eisden
- Number: 6

Youth career
- 1993–1997: Sporting Houthalen
- 1997–1999: Anderlecht
- 1999–2007: PSV Eindhoven

Senior career*
Years	Team	Apps	(Gls)
2007–2008	Sint-Truiden	1	(0)
2008	→ Antwerp (loan)	12	(1)
2008–2009	Royal Antwerp	4	(0)
2009	Blackpool	0	(0)
2009–2010	Giulianova	24	(1)
2010–2012	Bocholt VV	60	(9)
2012–2013	Rupel Boom	12	(0)
2013–2014	Dessel Sport	21	(1)
2014–2017	KSK Hasselt	98	(15)
2017–2018	RFC Liège	24	(1)
2018–	Patro Eisden	43	(0)
- * Club domestic league appearances and goals as of 1 January 2020 (UTC)

Francesco Ferdinando Christian Carratta (born 17 August 1987 in Hasselt) is a Belgian footballer of Italian descent who plays for Patro Eisden.

== Career ==
Carratta started as a youngster at his hometown club Sporting Houthalen before progressing through the youth team ranks at Anderlecht and then moving to the Netherlands to join PSV Eindhoven in 1999, playing in their youth team until 2007.

In April 2007 he returned to Belgium, on trial with Sint-Truidense, before signing on a free transfer on 25 May on a two-year contract, with an option for a further two years.

In the 2007-08 season he made one league appearance for them in the Belgian First Division before joining Royal Antwerp initially on loan, making twelve league appearances and scoring one goal in a 7–0 win over Beveren on 1 March 2008 at the Freethiel Stadion. Later in 2008 he joined the club permanently.

On 2 February 2009 he signed for Championship club Blackpool on a free transfer, signing a contract until the end of the 2008–09 season. Carratta said of the move, "I'm very delighted to make the move, because for me it is a big step to come to England. I couldn't refuse a chance like this and I want to do my best for the team."

On 9 June 2009, Blackpool confirmed that Carratta had not been offered a new deal and that he was being released.
