= Matty Kay =

English footballer (born 1989)

Personal information
- Date of birth: 12 October 1989 (age 37)
- Place of birth: Blackpool, England
- Position: Midfielder

Team information
- Current team: Squires Gate

Senior career*
Years	Team	Apps	(Gls)
2005–2009	Blackpool	1	(0)
2008	→ Fleetwood Town (loan)	8	(0)
2009	Burscough	1	(0)
2009–	AFC Fylde	?	(?)
2012–2016	Bamber Bridge		
2017	Bamber Bridge		
2018	Blackpool Wren Rovers		
2018–	Squires Gate		
- * Club domestic league appearances and goals as of 16:22, 19 May 2011 (UTC)

Matthew Kay (born 12 October 1989) is an English footballer who plays for Squires Gate as a midfielder.

== Career ==
=== Blackpool ===
Born in Blackpool, Lancashire, Kay made his debut for Blackpool against Scunthorpe United on 13 November 2005, in front of the Sky Sports cameras, setting a new club record as the youngest player, at 16 years 32 days, ever to play for Blackpool in a league match. Trevor Sinclair previously held the Blackpool record for a league match after his debut in 1989, at the age of 16 years 170 days. At the time, Kay was still a pupil at Collegiate High School in Blackpool. Kay signed professional terms with Blackpool in June 2006 after leaving school the previous month. On 7 May 2008 Blackpool activated an option to extend his contract with the club by one year.

On 9 June 2009, Blackpool confirmed that Kay had not been offered a new deal and that he was being released.

==== Fleetwood Town (loan) ====
After becoming a regular in the Blackpool reserve team, on 17 October 2008 Kay signed for Conference North club Fleetwood Town on loan until 22 November. He made his debut for Fleetwood on 18 October in a 2–1 home defeat at Highbury Stadium against Stalybridge Celtic. On 25 October 2008 he played in Fleetwood's FA Cup fourth qualifying round 4–3 win over Nantwich Town, which saw the club reach the First round proper, in which they played Leiston of the Eastern Counties League Premier Division with Kay helping Fleetwood to win the replay at Highbury Stadium 2–0 on 18 November and so reach the second round.

The loan was extended on 21 November, keeping Kay at Highbury until 26 December. He returned to Blackpool on 30 December.

=== Burscough ===
On 18 August 2009, Kay joined Northern Premier League side Burscough.

=== AFC Fylde ===
On 28 November 2009, Kay moved to AFC Fylde who were newly promoted into the Northern Premier League Division One North. He scored his first goal for the club on his full debut in a NPL Presidents Cup win over Warrington Town.

=== Bamber Bridge ===
He joined Bamber Bridge in September 2012. where he became club captain over a number of successful league campaigns. He left the club in the summer of 2016 after being told by the manager his future did not lie with the club. However, in June 2017 he rejoined Bamber Bridge.

=== Later career ===
Following his departure from Bamber Bridge, he signed for Blackpool Wren Rovers before transferring to Squires Gate.
