= 2014–15 Derby County F.C. season =

Derby County
2014–15 season
- Chairman: Andy Appleby
- Head Coach: Steve McClaren
- Stadium: iPro Stadium
- Championship: 8th
- FA Cup: Fifth round
- League Cup: Fifth round
- Top goalscorer: League: Chris Martin (18); All: Chris Martin (21)
- Highest home attendance: 32,705 vs. Nottingham Forest; 17 January 2015
- Lowest home attendance: 26,373 vs. Blackburn Rovers; 27 January 2015
- Average home league attendance: 29,231
Home colours	Away colours	Third colours

The 2014–15 Derby County F.C. season was the 109th edition in the Football League and 116th season overall of football played by Derby County F.C., an English football club based in Derby, Derbyshire. Their third-place finish in the 2013–14 season and losing out to Queens Park Rangers in the play-off final means it was their seventh consecutive season in the Championship, and it was their 47th season overall in the second division of English football. It will be Steve McClaren's first full season as head coach of the team.

== Overview ==
Derby County played their league games in the Championship in the 2014-15 season, the fixtures were announced on 18 June 2014. The season began on 9 August 2014 and concluded on 2 May 2015 For the majority of their league campaign, Derby County were placed around the top positions in the league, being in first place on three separate occasions. However, a collapse in form from March saw them drop from first place to eventually finishing eighth.

Derby entered the League Cup in the first round, the draw for this was announced on 17 June 2014. Derby were in the northern half of the draw and were one of the seeded teams. They were drawn an away tie against non-seeded, League Two side Carlisle United. After defeating Carlisle, Derby went through to the second round of the competition. They were one of the seeded teams in the draw and they were drawn to play Charlton Athletic in the second round. They defeated Charlton Athletic and in the third round faced Reading. Derby progressed through to the fourth round of the competition after defeating Reading, and in the fourth round draw they were given an away tie at another Championship team, which was Fulham. After managing to defeat Fulham away from home, Derby were drawn at home to Premier League club Chelsea in the quarter-finals. They exited the competition at this stage after a 3–1 home defeat to Chelsea.

Derby entered the FA Cup at the third round stage. The draw for this was made on 8 December 2014, and Derby were drawn to play Conference Premier side Southport at home. After winning their third round tie, they were drawn to play at home to either Chesterfield or Scunthorpe United in the fourth round draw. Their third round fixture had to go to a replay which Chesterfield won, therefore confirming that Derby County's fourth-round match was versus fellow Derbyshire side Chesterfield. They made it through to the fifth round, where they were drawn another home tie, playing Championship team Reading. Derby were knocked out of the FA Cup in the fifth round after losing the tie to Reading.

=== Pre-season ===
The club's preparations for the season started with the players returning to training on 25 June 2014. Derby County arranged their first four pre-season fixtures against non-league teams and they were announced on 27 May 2014. The club also announced a further pre-season fixture versus League One side Notts County, and another versus League Two club Burton Albion. A behind closed doors friendly against Northampton Town was also arranged, however this replaced the fixture again non-league side Mickleover Sports, which because of this became an under 21s fixture. On 9 June 2014, the club confirmed a friendly against Russian Premier League side Zenit St Petersburg on 22 July, as part of a six-day training camp in Austria. They also confirmed a pre-season friendly against Bosnia and Herzegovina club Slavija Sarajevo on 25 July whilst in Austria. A home friendly, announced on 13 June 2014, against Scottish Championship team Rangers was played at the iPro Stadium on 2 August 2014.

Derby started their pre-season well, winning four and drawing one of their first five friendly matches. However, they faced defeat for the first time when they lost their friendly against Zenit St Petersburg in their first match of their Austria tour. In the match versus Zenit, new signing George Thorne picked up an injury and was substituted in the first half. On 24 July 2014, it was revealed that Thorne suffered an anterior cruciate ligament injury in his left knee, which would see him ruled out for up to nine months. Overall from Derby's nine first team friendlies they won seven, drew one, and lost one.

Derby County retained 21 players from the previous season, these were players still under contract going into the new season. Jamie Ward and John Eustace had one-year extension options on their current contracts which both players used. During the pre-season months, Derby agreed new contracts to several current players. On 25 June 2014, Lee Naylor agreed a new contract, having completed a short-term stay last season. On 26 June 2014, midfielder Jeff Hendrick signed a new four-year contract with Derby to keep him until the end of the 2017-18 season. The following day, Craig Forsyth also signed a new four-year contract with Derby. Defender Jake Buxton signed a new three-year contract on 30 June 2014. On 1 July 2014, Will Hughes followed his teammates by extending his contract as well, with a new four-year deal. On 25 June 2014, Derby County received and immediately rejected, an undisclosed bid from Burnley for 2013-14 player of the year winner Craig Bryson. On 3 July 2014, Bryson confirmed he will be staying at the club by agreeing a new five-year contract, a deal which would see him stay until the summer of 2019. Young forward Mason Bennett became the last player before the season began to commit to a new contract, by agreeing a new four-year deal at the club on 29 July 2014.

In the pre-season transfer window, Derby County brought in several players for the first team and youth teams too. Derby's first deal was announced on 4 June 2014, with young goalkeeper Jonathan Mitchell joining from Newcastle United on a free transfer. With his contract with Newcastle expiring at the end of June, Mitchell officially joined Derby County from 1 July 2014, at the start of the summer transfer window. The second transfer was another free, Kosovan attacking midfielder Alban Bunjaku, who was previously at La Liga club Sevilla, signed for Derby on 10 June 2014. On 25 June 2014, Derby announced that Zak Whitbread agreed a one-year deal to join the club on a permanent basis, he was previously at Derby County for the 2013-14 season on loan. On 1 July 2014, the first day of the transfer window opening, Derby signed Alefe Santos on a free transfer, after he turned down a new contract at his previous club Bristol Rovers. On 10 July 2014, Derby agreed a deal to sign right back Cyrus Christie on a three-year contract. He was out of contract at his previous club Coventry City, however the clubs agreed compensation for him since he came through Coventry's academy and was under 23 years old. The compensation fee was undisclosed. During pre-season, Spanish attacking midfielder and youth international Iván Calero joined Derby on a trial period. Following his trial, on 18 July 2014 he agreed a two-year permanent deal with the club, with an option of a further year. Two bids were made for West Brom midfielder George Thorne, who was at Derby on loan last season, to try to bring him to the club again. Even with the player himself offering a formal transfer request on two occasions, both undisclosed bids were rejected. Weeks after this, on 18 July 2014, Derby County and West Brom agreed a fee for Thorne. The following day, after agreeing personal terms and passing a medical, Thorne joined Derby on a four-year contract. On 1 August 2014, Derby signed forward Shaq McDonald, who had been on trial during pre-season. He agreed a two-year deal. Derby continued to bring in new players in the transfer window, and on 4 August 2014 Leon Best joined on a season-long loan deal from Blackburn Rovers. On 6 August, Derby agreed a deal to bring in Real Madrid midfielder Omar Mascarell on a season-long loan.

Several of Derby's players had come to the end of their contracts in the previous season and were therefore released by the club. The only transfer away from the club after this came on 23 July 2014, when they loaned out under-21s defender Josh Lelan to League One club Swindon Town. The loan deal would see him join Swindon for a month until 23 August.

None of Derby County's under contract players were sold in pre-season, however Derby turned down a bid for right back Kieron Freeman on 16 July 2014. The bid was from Sheffield United, which was one of the clubs he was loaned out to last season.

There was an addition in the ownership of the club on 28 May 2014. The club announced that Derby-born businessman, Mel Morris, had become a new owner and director of Derby County and therefore became a new member of the board of directors. He was previously a director of the club in 2006 and 2007. Morris was also a shareholder in, and non-executive chairman of King, the company behind the highly successful smartphone game Candy Crush Saga. During pre-season, Derby County's academy was improved to try to improve the club's youth development. Following this on 25 July 2014 they achieved category one status, meaning their youth players will compete in the Under 21 Premier League and Under 18 Premier League for the first time. In the final week before the season began, Steve McClaren, Paul Simpson and Eric Steele all agreed new contracts which run until summer 2017.

=== August ===
During August, Derby County played seven fixtures including five League games and two in the League Cup. They won both cup games to progress to the third round. In the league they won two, drew two, and lost only one game, giving them a seventh-place position at the end of August.

The club were also involved in the transfer market during the rest of August. On 25 August 2014, Derby County agreed a loan deal to sign defender Ryan Shotton from Stoke City, with a view to a permanent move. On 29 August 2014, Derby brought in another player on loan with Liverpool forward Jordon Ibe joining the club on a season-long loan.

Some players were let out on loan from the club, but no players left Derby permanently during August. On 12 August 2014, Mason Bennett joined League One side Bradford City for a half-season loan. On 15 August 2014, Irish duo Conor Sammon and Mark O'Brien went out on loan to Ipswich Town and Motherwell respectively. Sammon's loan was for the rest of the season, whilst O'Brien was sent out until January. On 29 August 2014, defender Josh Lelan, who was already out on loan, extended his deal at Swindon Town by a further month.

Two players already at the club agreed new contracts. On 14 August 2014, Jamie Ward agreed a new two-year contract at Derby, which would extend his stay at the club until the summer of 2016. On 30 August 2014, Head Coach Steve McClaren revealed that last season's top scorer Chris Martin had agreed a new four-year deal with the club.

=== September ===
During September Derby played six competitive fixtures, five in the League and one in the League Cup. They were unbeaten throughout the month, winning four and drawing two games. They finished September fourth in the Championship.

The summer transfer window ended in September. On 1 September 2014, the last day of the summer transfer window, Derby County signed German midfielder Tom Koblenz from Bundesliga club Hoffenheim. He agreed a two-year contract after a successful trial period.

One player left the club out on loan during September. On 18 September 2014, defender Tom Naylor joined League Two club Cambridge United on a month's loan.

Derby County captain Richard Keogh agreed a new three-year contract at the club on 22 September 2014, which would extend his stay at the club until the summer of 2017.

Steve McClaren was one of the four managers nominated for Championship Manager of the Month for September, however Ipswich Town manager Mick McCarthy won the award.

=== October ===
Derby County played five fixtures during October, with four in the League and one in the League Cup. In all competitions they won three, drew one, and lost one during October. They ended October in first place in the Championship.

During October, goalkeeper Lee Grant was ruled out of action with an ankle sprain. Following this, on 20 October 2014, England U21s goalkeeper Jack Butland was brought in on a month-long loan from Stoke City as cover for Grant.

On 3 October 2014, defender Kieron Freeman joined League 2 side Mansfield Town on a 93-day emergency loan deal. On 21 October 2014, Norwegian goalkeeper Mats Mørch joined Conference North side Leamington in a loan deal until 31 December 2014.

On 14 October 2014, Mason Bennett was recalled from his loan spell at Bradford City.

=== November ===
There were five fixtures for Derby County during November, all of them in the Championship. They won three and lost two, which kept them at the top of the Championship league table at the end of the month.

On 18 November 2014, Derby extended Jack Butland's loan at the club by a further week to remain as cover as first choice goalkeeper.

Lee Grant returned from injury towards the end of November and took his place back as first choice goalkeeper, therefore Jack Butland's loan was ended.

=== December ===
Derby County had six fixtures during December. Five in the Championship, and one in the League Cup. They won three, drew one, and lost one in the league. However, they lost their quarter-final fixture in the League Cup. They ended the calendar year in third place in the Championship.

=== January ===
In January, Derby County had four fixtures in the Championship, and two in the FA Cup. They won three and lost one in the league, and won both of their FA Cup matches. At the end of January they were second in the Championship.

The mid-season transfer window opened in January, which saw several players join the club. On 1 January 2015, defender Ryan Shotton agreed a permanent deal with the club after being on loan for the first half of the season. He agreed a 2 1/2-year contract. The following day, striker Darren Bent joined Derby on loan for the rest of the season from Premier League club Aston Villa. After being on trial, Swedish defender Isak Ssewankambo joined Derby County on 12 January 2015, on a two-and-a-half-year deal. On 15 January 2015, left-back Stephen Warnock joined the club for an undisclosed fee from Leeds United. He agreed an 18-month deal with an option of a further year. On 16 January 2015, Spanish centre-back Raúl Albentosa joined Derby County from La Liga club SD Eibar on a 2 1/2-year contract.

There were also players who moved away from Derby County during the January transfer window. Mark O'Brien extended his loan deal at Motherwell on 5 January 2015. His deal was originally a half-season loan, but was extended for the rest of the season. On 9 January 2015, Alefe Santos joined League One club Notts County, on a one-month youth loan deal. Kwame Thomas made a similar move three days later, also moving to Notts County on a one-month youth loan. On 15 January 2015, striker Conor Sammon's loan deal with Ipswich Town was terminated early, and on the same day he joined Rotherham United on loan for the rest of the season. On 23 January 2015, Paul Coutts and Kieron Freeman joined League One club Sheffield United permanently. Coutts joined for an undisclosed fee, whereas Freeman joined for free, after cancelling his contract at Derby by mutual consent. Defender Tom Naylor left the club on loan on 30 January 2015. He joined League Two club Burton Albion for the rest of the season.

Striker Leon Best's loan with Derby was cancelled on 6 January 2015, by activating a clause in his contract. The original loan deal was season-long, however he was sent back to his parent club Blackburn Rovers. On 15 January 2015, Jordon Ibe was recalled by his parent club Liverpool, therefore ending his loan at the club with immediate effect.

On 6 January 2015, Steve Round joined Derby County's coaching staff on a part-time basis. Round had previous spells at the club as a player and coach, and had worked with Head Coach Steve McClaren before as well.

On 7 January 2015, Goalkeeper Lee Grant signed a new contract with the club. He agreed a new deal which will run until 2017.

Derby County manager Steve McClaren was nominated for Championship Manager of the Month for January. However, Middlesbrough manager Aitor Karanka won the award.

=== February ===
Derby County played seven fixtures in February; six in the Championship and one in the FA Cup. They won three, drew two, and lost one from their league fixtures. They lost their fixture in the FA Cup and exited the competition in February. At the end of the month they were top of the Championship.

On 2 February 2015, the last day of the mid-season transfer window, Derby County signed winger Tom Ince from Premier League club Hull City, on loan for the rest of the season. On the same day, Iván Calero joined Burton Albion on a one-month youth loan deal. Also on transfer deadline day, midfielder Jesse Lingard signed on loan from Manchester United for the rest of the season.

On loan winger Tom Ince was nominated for Championship Player of the Month for February, however he did not win the award.

=== March ===
In March, Derby County had five matches in the Championship. They failed to win any of their fixtures in March, drawing two and losing three. They finished the month fifth in the Championship.

On 7 March 2015, defender Farrend Rawson joined Championship club Rotherham United on a 28-day youth loan.

=== April ===
There were six Championship fixtures for Derby County in April. They won two and drew four, and ended the month in sixth position in the Championship.

On loan winger Tom Ince won Championship Player of the Month for April, after scoring five goals in six matches during April.

=== May ===
Derby County played their final game of the season in May, which ended in defeat. They ended the season eighth in the Championship.

== Transfers ==
Last updated: 26 March 2015

_{Note: Flags indicate national team as has been defined under FIFA eligibility rules. Players may hold more than one non-FIFA nationality.}

Players transferred in
Date	Pos.	Name	Previous club	Fee	Ref.
10 June 2014	MF	(Kosovo) Alban Bunjaku	(Spain) Sevilla	Free	
25 June 2014	DF	(United States) Zak Whitbread	(England) Leicester City	Free	
1 July 2014	GK	(England) Jonathan Mitchell	(England) Newcastle United	Free	
1 July 2014	FW	(Brazil) Alefe Santos	(England) Bristol Rovers	Free	
10 July 2014	DF	(England) Cyrus Christie	(England) Coventry City	Undisclosed^{1}	
18 July 2014	MF	(Spain) Iván Calero	(Spain) Atlético Madrid	Free	
19 July 2014	MF	(England) George Thorne	(England) West Bromwich Albion	Undisclosed	
1 August 2014	FW	(England) Shaq McDonald	(England) York City	Free	
1 September 2014	MF	(Germany) Tom Koblenz	(Germany) Hoffenheim	Free	
1 January 2015	DF	(England) Ryan Shotton	(England) Stoke City	Undisclosed	
12 January 2015	DF	(Sweden) Isak Ssewankambo	(Netherlands) NAC Breda	Free	
15 January 2015	DF	(England) Stephen Warnock	(England) Leeds United	Undisclosed	
16 January 2015	DF	(Spain) Raúl Albentosa	(Spain) SD Eibar	Undisclosed	
Players transferred out
Date	Pos.	Name	To	Fee	Ref.
7 May 2014	GK	(England) Ross Atkins	(England) Gresley	Free	
7 May 2014	DF	(Albania) Valentin Gjokaj	(England) Gateshead	Free	
7 May 2014	DF	(England) Michael Hoganson	Free Agent	Released	
7 May 2014	DF	(England) James O'Connor	(England) Walsall	Free	
7 May 2014	FW	(England) Callum Ball	(Scotland) St Mirren	Free	
27 May 2014	GK	(England) Adam Legzdins	(England) Leyton Orient	Free	
27 May 2014	MF	(England) James Bailey	(England) Barnsley	Free	
27 May 2014	MF	(England) Ben Davies	(England) Sheffield United	Free	
23 January 2015	MF	(Scotland) Paul Coutts	(England) Sheffield United	Undisclosed	
23 January 2015	DF	(Wales) Kieron Freeman	(England) Sheffield United	Free	
Players loaned in
Date from	Pos.	Name	From	Date to	Ref.
4 August 2014	FW	(Republic of Ireland) Leon Best	(England) Blackburn Rovers	6 January 2015^{2}	
6 August 2014	MF	(Spain) Omar Mascarell	(Spain) Real Madrid	2 May 2015	
25 August 2014	DF	(England) Ryan Shotton	(England) Stoke City	31 December 2014^{3}	
29 August 2014	FW	(England) Jordon Ibe	(England) Liverpool	15 January 2015^{4}	
20 October 2014	GK	(England) Jack Butland	(England) Stoke City	27 November 2014^{5}	
2 January 2015	FW	(England) Darren Bent	(England) Aston Villa	2 May 2015	
2 February 2015	FW	(England) Tom Ince	(England) Hull City	2 May 2015	
2 February 2015	MF	(England) Jesse Lingard	(England) Manchester United	2 May 2015	
Players loaned out
Date from	Pos.	Name	To	Date to	Ref.
23 July 2014	DF	(England) Josh Lelan	(England) Swindon Town	27 September 2014^{6}	
12 August 2014	FW	(England) Mason Bennett	(England) Bradford City	14 October 2014^{7}	
15 August 2014	FW	(Republic of Ireland) Conor Sammon	(England) Ipswich Town	15 January 2015^{8}	
15 August 2014	DF	(Republic of Ireland) Mark O'Brien	(Scotland) Motherwell	30 June 2015^{9}	
19 September 2014	DF	(England) Tom Naylor	(England) Cambridge United	22 October 2014	
3 October 2014	DF	(Wales) Kieron Freeman	(England) Mansfield Town	3 January 2015	
21 October 2014	GK	(Norway) Mats Mørch	(England) Leamington	31 December 2014	
14 November 2014	GK	(England) Ross Etheridge	(England) Leek Town	14 December 2014	
9 January 2015	FW	(Brazil) Alefe Santos	(England) Notts County	9 February 2015	
12 January 2015	FW	(England) Kwame Thomas	(England) Notts County	12 February 2015	
15 January 2015	FW	(Republic of Ireland) Conor Sammon	(England) Rotherham United	30 June 2015	
30 January 2015	DF	(England) Tom Naylor	(England) Burton Albion	30 June 2015	
2 February 2015	MF	(Spain) Iván Calero	(England) Burton Albion	2 March 2015	
7 March 2015	DF	(England) Farrend Rawson	(England) Rotherham United	4 April 2015	
26 March 2015	FW	(England) Shaq McDonald	(England) Cheltenham Town	30 June 2015	

- 1 = No transfer fee, but a compensation fee was paid, which was undisclosed.
- 2 = Original loan was until 2 May 2015, but Best's loan was ended on 6 January 2015.
- 3 = Original loan was until 2 May 2015, but Shotton joined on a permanent basis on 1 January 2015.
- 4 = Original loan was until 2 May 2015, but Ibe was recalled by Liverpool on 15 January 2015.
- 5 = Original loan was until 17 November 2014, but was extended by a further week.
- 6 = Original loan was until 23 August 2014, but was extended by a further month.
- 7 = Original loan was until 5 January 2015, but Bennett was recalled on 14 October 2014.
- 8 = Original loan was until 2 May 2015, but Sammon's loan was terminated early on 15 January 2015.
- 9 = Original loan was until 31 December 2014, but was extended until the end of the season.

== Players ==
Last updated: 3 February 2015

_{Note: Flags indicate national team as has been defined under FIFA eligibility rules. Players may hold more than one non-FIFA nationality.}

No.	Name	Nationality	Date of birth (age)	Previous club	Signed in	Contract ends	Ref.
Goalkeepers
1	Lee Grant	(England)	27 January 1983 (age 43)	(England) Burnley	2013	2017	
21	Kelle Roos	(Netherlands)	31 May 1992 (age 34)	(England) Nuneaton Town	2014	2016	
35	Jonathan Mitchell	(England)	24 November 1994 (age 31)	(England) Newcastle United	2014	2015	
36	Jack Butland	(England)	10 March 1993 (age 33)	(England) Stoke City	2014	2014	
Defenders
2	Cyrus Christie	(England)	30 September 1992 (age 34)	(England) Coventry City	2014	2017	
3	Craig Forsyth	(Scotland)	21 March 1992 (age 34)	(England) Watford	2013	2018	
5	Jake Buxton	(England)	4 March 1985 (age 41)	(England) Burton Albion	2009	2017	
6	Richard Keogh	(Republic of Ireland)	11 August 1986 (age 40)	(England) Coventry City	2012	2017	
12	Lee Naylor	(England)	19 March 1980 (age 46)	(England) Accrington Stanley	2014	2015	
15	Mark O'Brien	(Republic of Ireland)	20 November 1992 (age 33)	Trainee	2009	2015	
17	Zak Whitbread	(United States)	10 January 1984 (age 42)	(England) Leicester City	2014	2015	
23	Kieron Freeman	(Wales)	21 March 1992 (age 34)	(England) Nottingham Forest	2012	2016	
24	Tom Naylor	(England)	28 June 1991 (age 35)	(England) Mansfield Town	2012	2015	
25	Shaun Barker	(England)	19 September 1982 (age 44)	(England) Blackpool	2009	2015	
26	Jamie Hanson	(England)	10 November 1995 (age 30)	Trainee	2014	2015	
28	Farrend Rawson	(England)	11 July 1996 (age 30)	Trainee	2014	2015	
30	Isak Ssewankambo	(Sweden)	27 February 1996 (age 30)	(Netherlands) NAC Breda	2015	2017	
32	Ryan Shotton	(England)	30 October 1988 (age 37)	(England) Stoke City	2014	2017	
36	Raúl Albentosa	(Spain)	7 September 1988 (age 38)	(Spain) SD Eibar	2015	2017	
37	Stephen Warnock	(England)	12 December 1981 (age 44)	(England) Leeds United	2015	2016	
Midfielders
4	Craig Bryson	(Scotland)	6 November 1986 (age 39)	(Scotland) Kilmarnock	2011	2019	
8	Jeff Hendrick	(Republic of Ireland)	31 January 1992 (age 34)	Trainee	2010	2018	
14	John Eustace	(England)	3 November 1979 (age 46)	(England) Watford	2013	2015	
16	Paul Coutts	(Scotland)	22 July 1988 (age 38)	(England) Preston North End	2012	2015	
16	Jesse Lingard	(England)	15 December 1992 (age 33)	(England) Manchester United	2015	2015	
19	Will Hughes	(England)	7 April 1995 (age 31)	Trainee	2011	2018	
22	Alban Bunjaku	(Kosovo)	20 May 1994 (age 32)	(Spain) Sevilla	2014	2016	
27	Iván Calero	(Spain)	21 April 1995 (age 31)	(Spain) Atlético Madrid	2014	2016	
33	Omar Mascarell	(Spain)	2 February 1993 (age 33)	(Spain) Real Madrid	2014	2015	
34	George Thorne	(England)	4 January 1993 (age 33)	(England) West Bromwich Albion	2014	2018	
Forwards
7	Simon Dawkins	(Jamaica)	1 December 1987 (age 38)	(England) Tottenham Hotspur	2013	2016	
9	Chris Martin	(Scotland)	4 November 1988 (age 37)	(England) Norwich City	2013	2018	
10	Jamie Ward	(Northern Ireland)	12 May 1986 (age 40)	(England) Sheffield United	2011	2016	
11	Johnny Russell	(Scotland)	8 May 1990 (age 36)	(Scotland) Dundee United	2013	2017	
18	Conor Sammon	(Republic of Ireland)	13 April 1987 (age 39)	(England) Wigan Athletic	2012	2016	
20	Mason Bennett	(England)	15 July 1996 (age 30)	Trainee	2011	2018	
23	Tom Ince	(England)	30 January 1992 (age 34)	Hull City	2015	2015	
29	Kwame Thomas	(England)	28 September 1995 (age 31)	Trainee	2014	2015	
30	Leon Best	(Republic of Ireland)	19 September 1986 (age 40)	(England) Blackburn Rovers	2014	2015	
31	Alefe Santos	(Brazil)	1 March 1995 (age 31)	(England) Bristol Rovers	2014	2016	
39	Darren Bent	(England)	6 February 1984 (age 42)	(England) Aston Villa	2015	2015	
44	Jordon Ibe	(England)	8 December 1995 (age 30)	(England) Liverpool	2014	2015	

== Football Staff ==
Last updated: 6 January 2015

Position	Name
Head Coach	(England) Steve McClaren
First Team Coach	(England) Paul Simpson
Goalkeeping Coach	(England) Eric Steele
Part-time Coach	(England) Steve Round
Head of Football Operations	(Wales) Chris Evans
Head Physio	(England) Neil Sullivan
Head of Sports Science	(Brazil) Alessandro Schoenmaker
Strength & Conditioning Coach	(England) Steve Haines
Kit Manager	(England) Gordon Guthrie
Performance Analyst	(England) Paul Winstanley
Academy Manager & Youth Team Manager	(England) Darren Wassall
Senior Professional Development Coach & U21 Manager	(England) Lee Glover

== Kit ==
Derby County's kit manufacturer for the 2014-15 season was Umbro. This was the first season in a four-year deal after the previous deal with Italian sportswear company Kappa was terminated early. The contract with Kappa was supposed to last until the 2017-18 season, however the club decided to switch to a different kit supplier.

The main shirt sponsor was online takeaway company, JUST EAT, and their logo will be on the front of the Derby County kits. This was the first of a three-year deal to have the company sponsor the kit.

The home kit was revealed on 3 July 2014. The kit's simple design had traditional white top and black shorts, with a black round-neck collar.

The away and third kits were revealed on 8 July 2014. The away shirt was navy, as well as navy shorts and socks. The third kit design was an all yellow shirt, along with royal blue shorts and socks.

Home	Away	Third

== Results ==
=== Friendlies ===
Win Draw Loss Postponed

3 July 2014	Matlock Town	0–1	Derby County	Causeway Lane
19:45 GMT		Report	Forsyth 41'	Attendance: 1477

5 July 2014	Ilkeston	0–0	Derby County	New Manor Ground
15:00 GMT		Report

8 July 2014	Nuneaton Town	1–2	Derby County	Liberty Way
19:45 GMT	Wright 89'	Report	Ward 51'; Bennett 77'	Attendance: 760 (211 away fans)

10 July 2014	Derby County	4–2	Northampton Town	Champney Springs
11:00 GMT	Hendrick; Sammon; Eustace	Report	Carter; Moyo	Attendance: N/A

19 July 2014	Notts County	1–3	Derby County	Meadow Lane
13:00 GMT	Whitehouse 30'	Report	Martin 40', 52' (pen.), 76'	Attendance: 3,235 (1,742 away fans)

22 July 2014	Zenit St Petersburg	2–0	Derby County	Sportzentrum Kalsdorf
18:30 CET	Witsel 33'; Solovyov 85'	Report

25 July 2014	Slavija Sarajevo	0–1	Derby County	Sportplatz Jennersdorf
18:00 CET		Report	Bryson 62'

29 July 2014	Burton Albion	0–1	Derby County	Pirelli Stadium
19:30 GMT		Report	Hendrick 44'	Attendance: 3,743

2 August 2014	Derby County	2–0	Rangers	iPro Stadium
13:00 GMT	Martin 57', 72'	Report		Attendance: 17,860 (8,576 Away Supporters)

=== Championship ===
Round	1	2	3	4	5	6	7	8	9	10	11	12	13	14	15	16	17	18	19	20	21	22	23	24	25	26	27	28	29	30	31	32	33	34	35	36	37	38	39	40	41	42	43	44	45	46
Ground	H	A	A	H	H	A	A	H	A	H	H	A	A	H	A	H	H	A	A	H	A	H	A	H	A	H	H	A	H	A	A	H	H	A	A	H	A	H	A	H	A	H	H	A	A	H
Result	W	D	L	W	D	D	W	D	W	W	D	W	W	L	L	W	W	W	L	W	L	D	W	W	W	L	W	W	W	D	D	W	W	L	L	D	D	L	L	D	W	D	W	D	D	L
Position	7	8	13	7	7	10	7	9	6	4	4	2	1	1	5	4	1	1	1	1	3	5	3	3	2	3	2	2	2	3	3	1	1	1	2	2	4	5	5	6	5	5	5	5	6	8

A = Away; H = Home; W = Win; D = Draw; L = Loss

9 August 2014 1	Derby County	1–0	Rotherham United	Derby
15:00 GMT	Hendrick 82'	Report		Stadium: iPro Stadium; Attendance: 30,105; Referee: Kevin Friend

16 August 2014 2	Sheffield Wednesday	0–0	Derby County	Sheffield
15:00 GMT		Report		Stadium: Hillsborough; Attendance: 25,186; Referee: Scott Duncan

19 August 2014 3	Charlton Athletic	3–2	Derby County	Charlton
19:45 GMT	Țucudean 11'; Buyens 45+5' (pen.); Vetokele 78'	Report	Ward 31', 85'	Stadium: The Valley; Attendance: 15,317; Referee: Michael Bull

23 August 2014 4	Derby County	5–1	Fulham	Derby
15:00 GMT	Ward 23'; Bryson 59'; Martin 61', 87'; Dawkins 88'	Report	Parker 54'	Stadium: iPro Stadium; Attendance: 26,577; Referee: Oliver Langford

30 August 2014 5	Derby County	1–1	Ipswich Town	Derby
15:00 GMT	Martin 13'	Report	Berra 52'	Stadium: iPro Stadium; Attendance: 26,673; Referee: Eddie Ilderton

13 September 2014 6	Nottingham Forest	1–1	Derby County	West Bridgford
13:15 GMT	Assombalonga 72'	Report	Shotton 80'	Stadium: City Ground; Attendance: 30,227; Referee: Paul Tierney

17 September 2014 7	Blackburn Rovers	2–3	Derby County	Blackburn
19:45 GMT	Marshall 1'; Gestede 78'	Report	Ward 9', 58'; Hughes 37'	Stadium: Ewood Park; Attendance: 13,566; Referee: David Webb

20 September 2014 8	Derby County	2–2	Cardiff City	Derby
15:00 GMT	Ibe 61'; Bryson 84'	Report	Gunnarsson 51'; Whittingham 55'	Stadium: iPro Stadium; Attendance: 27,251; Referee: Andre Marriner

27 September 2014 9	Bolton Wanderers	0–2	Derby County	Bolton
15:00 GMT		Report	Martin 38', 57'	Stadium: Macron Stadium; Attendance: 15,006; Referee: Mark Brown

30 September 2014 10	Derby County	2–0	Bournemouth	Derby
19:45 GMT	Hughes 81'; Martin 90'	Report		Stadium: iPro Stadium; Attendance: 26,725; Referee: Scott Mathieson

4 October 2014 11	Derby County	0–0	Millwall	Derby
15:00 GMT		Report		Stadium: iPro Stadium; Attendance: 27,749; Referee: Mark Haywood

18 October 2014 12	Reading	0–3	Derby County	Reading
15:00 GMT		Report	Martin 18', 79'; Ibe 38'	Stadium: Madejski Stadium; Attendance: 18,141; Referee: Darren Deadman

21 October 2014 13	Blackpool	0–1	Derby County	Blackpool
19:45 GMT		Report	Martin 81' (pen.)	Stadium: Bloomfield Road; Attendance: 11,036; Referee: Kevin Wright

25 October 2014 14	Derby County	1–2	Wigan Athletic	Derby
15:00 GMT	Eustace 45'	Report	McClean 69', 83'	Stadium: iPro Stadium; Attendance: 28,824; Referee: Robert Madley

1 November 2014 15	Brentford	2–1	Derby County	Brentford
15:00 GMT	Gray 49'; Dallas 90'	Report	Martin 27'	Stadium: Griffin Park; Attendance: 10,608; Referee: Carl Berry

4 November 2014 16	Derby County	3–2	Huddersfield Town	Derby
19:45 GMT	Ibe 7'; Russell 45'; Dawkins 77'	Report	Bunn 22'; Hudson 90'	Stadium: iPro Stadium; Attendance: 27,153; Referee: Keith Hill

8 November 2014 17	Derby County	5–0	Wolverhampton Wanderers	Derby
12:15 GMT	Shotton 16'; Hendrick 28', 55'; Russell 42', 61'	Report		Stadium: iPro Stadium; Attendance: 30,398 (2,565 away); Referee: Graham Salisbury

22 November 2014 18	Watford	1–2	Derby County	Watford
15:00 GMT	Munari 67'	Report	Ibe 39'; Bryson 81'	Stadium: Vicarage Road; Attendance: 17,421; Referee: Keith Stroud

29 November 2014 19	Leeds United	2–0	Derby County	Leeds
15:00 GMT	Antenucci 43', 50'	Report		Stadium: Elland Road; Attendance: 26,028; Referee: Mick Russell

6 December 2014 20	Derby County	3–0	Brighton & Hove Albion	Derby
15:00 GMT	Martin 10', 20'; Russell 15'	Report		Stadium: iPro Stadium; Attendance: 28,637; Referee: Mark Heywood

13 December 2014 21	Middlesbrough	2–0	Derby County	Middlesbrough
12:15 GMT	Bamford 6'; Leadbitter 63' (pen.)	Report		Stadium: Riverside Stadium; Attendance: 17,434; Referee: Roger East

20 December 2014 22	Derby County	2–2	Norwich City	Derby
12:15 GMT	Russell 43'; Martin 55' (pen.)	Report	Jerome 51'; Whittaker 89'	Stadium: iPro Stadium; Attendance: 27,974; Referee: Paul Tierney

26 December 2014 23	Birmingham City	0–4	Derby County	Birmingham
15:00 GMT		Report	Ibe 9'; Martin 23'; Forsyth 77'; Russell 89'	Stadium: St. Andrews; Attendance: 23,851; Referee: Chris Foy

30 December 2014 24	Derby County	2–0	Leeds United	Derby
19:45 GMT	Mowatt 41' (o.g.); Buxton 47'	Report		Stadium: iPro Stadium; Attendance: 31,690 (2,236 away); Referee: Keith Stroud

10 January 2015 25	Ipswich Town	0–1	Derby County	Ipswich
12:15 GMT		Report	Martin 57'	Stadium: Portman Road; Attendance: 20,861; Referee: Kevin Wright

17 January 2015 26	Derby County	1–2	Nottingham Forest	Derby
12:15 GMT	Lansbury 16' (o.g.)	Report	Assombalonga 75'; Osborn 90'	Stadium: iPro Stadium; Attendance: 32,705; Referee: Andy Madley

27 January 2015 27	Derby County	2–0	Blackburn Rovers	Derby
19:45 GMT	Bent 68' 90'	Report		Stadium: iPro Stadium; Attendance: 26,373; Referee: Andy Davies

31 January 2015 28	Cardiff City	0–2	Derby County	Cardiff
15:00 GMT		Report	Malone 23' (o.g.); Martin 45'	Stadium: Cardiff City Stadium; Attendance: 22,227; Referee: Paul Tierney

7 February 2015 29	Derby County	4–1	Bolton Wanderers	Derby
15:00 GMT	Ince 39', 47'; Hendrick 45', 68'	Report	Twardzik 51'	Stadium: iPro Stadium; Attendance: 30,310; Referee: Tony Harrington

10 February 2015 30	Bournemouth	2–2	Derby County	Bournemouth
19:45 GMT	Ritchie 12'; Wilson 44'	Report	Ince 30'; Bent 68'	Stadium: Goldsands Stadium; Attendance: 11,031; Referee: Mark Clattenburg

17 February 2015 31	Rotherham United	3–3	Derby County	Rotherham
19:45 GMT	Green 35'; Smallwood 49'; Derbyshire 54'	Report	Ince 36', 64'; Bent 83'	Stadium: New York Stadium; Attendance: 11,035; Referee: Nigel Miller

21 February 2015 32	Derby County	3–2	Sheffield Wednesday	Derby
15:00 GMT	Buxton 47', 68'; Bent 77' (pen.)	Report	McGugan 20'; Keane 55'	Stadium: iPro Stadium; Attendance: 31,628; Referee: Darren Bond

24 February 2015 33	Derby County	2–0	Charlton Athletic	Derby
19:45 GMT	Hendrick 9'; Lingard 17'	Report		Stadium: iPro Stadium; Attendance: 28,277; Referee: David Coote

28 February 2015 34	Fulham	2–0	Derby County	Fulham
15:00 GMT	Bodurov 31'; Woodrow 45'	Report		Stadium: Craven Cottage; Attendance: 20,242; Referee: Mike Jones

3 March 2015 35	Brighton & Hove Albion	2–0	Derby County	Brighton and Hove
19:45 GMT	Stephens 69'; LuaLua 77'	Report		Stadium: Amex Stadium; Attendance: 23,665; Referee: Neil Swarbrick

7 March 2015 36	Derby County	2–2	Birmingham City	Derby
15:00 GMT	Ward 20'; Ince 48'	Report	Caddis 90'; Donaldson 90'	Stadium: iPro Stadium; Attendance: 31,522 (2,263 away); Referee: Iain Williamson

14 March 2015 37	Norwich City	1–1	Derby County	Norwich
15:00 GMT	Jerome 31'	Report	Hanson 66'	Stadium: Carrow Road; Attendance: 26,766; Referee: Lee Probert

17 March 2015 38	Derby County	0–1	Middlesbrough	Derby
19:45 GMT		Report	Bamford 64'	Stadium: iPro Stadium; Attendance: 31,939; Referee: Andy D'Urso

20 March 2015 39	Wolverhampton Wanderers	2–0	Derby County	Wolverhampton
19:45 GMT	Dicko 48'; Grant 69' (o.g.)	Report		Stadium: Molineux; Attendance: 27,480 (2,567 away); Referee: Keith Stroud

3 April 2015 40	Derby County	2–2	Watford	Derby
19:45 GMT	Bent 45' (pen.); Ince 57'	Report	Vydra 23'; Ighalo 75'	Stadium: iPro Stadium; Attendance: 31,748; Referee: Kevin Friend

6 April 2015 41	Wigan Athletic	0–2	Derby County	Wigan
15:00 GMT		Report	Martin 51'; Bent 81'	Stadium: DW Stadium; Attendance: 14,697; Referee: Simon Hooper

11 April 2015 42	Derby County	1–1	Brentford	Derby
12:45 GMT	Bent 90'	Report	Pritchard 28'	Stadium: iPro Stadium; Attendance: 30,043; Referee: Graham Scott

14 April 2015 43	Derby County	4–0	Blackpool	Derby
19:45 GMT	Bryson 3'; Ince 28'; Bent 29', 65' (pen.)	Report		Stadium: iPro Stadium; Attendance: 27,227; Referee: Oliver Langford

18 April 2015 44	Huddersfield Town	4–4	Derby County	Huddersfield
15:00 GMT	Gobern 38'; Hudson 41'; James 45'; Wells 72'	Report	Ince 16', 79'; Dawkins 52'; Lingard 61'	Stadium: John Smith's Stadium; Attendance: 15,889; Referee: Dean Whitestone

25 April 2015 45	Millwall	3–3	Derby County	Bermondsey
15:00 GMT	Gregory 26', 36' (pen.), 50' (pen.)	Report	Ince 42'; Martin 70' (pen.); Hendrick 85'	Stadium: The Den; Attendance: 12,571; Referee: David Coote

2 May 2015 46	Derby County	0–3	Reading	Derby
12:15 GMT		Report	Appiah 2'; Hector 72'; McCleary 85' (pen.)	Stadium: iPro Stadium; Attendance: 30,806; Referee: James Linington

=== League Cup ===
Win Draw Loss Postponed

11 August 2014 First round	Carlisle United	0–2	Derby County	Brunton Park
19:45 GMT		Report	Hendrick 62'; Martin 90'	Attendance: 3,481; Referee: Darren Bond

26 August 2014 Second round	Derby County	1–0	Charlton Athletic	iPro Stadium
19:45 GMT	Calero 87'	Report		Attendance: 16,367; Referee: Graham Salisbury

23 September 2014 Third round	Derby County	2–0	Reading	iPro Stadium
19:45 GMT	Russell 67'; Pearce 82' (o.g.)	Report		Attendance: 18,409; Referee: Simon Hooper

28 October 2014 Fourth round	Fulham	2–5	Derby County	Craven Cottage
19:45 GMT	Dembélé 27', 45'	Report	Martin 45' (pen.); Russell 47'; Dawkins 54', 65'; Hendrick 62'	Attendance: 15,156; Referee: Graham Scott

16 December 2014 Fifth round	Derby County	1–3	Chelsea	iPro Stadium
19:45 GMT	Bryson 71'	Report	Hazard 23'; Luís 56'; Schürrle 82'	Attendance: 30,639; Referee: Jonathan Moss

=== FA Cup ===
Win Draw Loss Postponed

3 January 2015 Third round proper	Derby County	1–0	Southport	iPro Stadium
15:00 GMT	Martin 90' (pen.)	Report		Attendance: 20,201; Referee: Graham Scott

24 January 2015 Fourth round proper	Derby County	2–0	Chesterfield	iPro Stadium
15:00 GMT	Bent 20'; Hughes 82'	Report		Attendance: 28,392; Referee: David Webb

14 February 2015 Fifth round proper	Derby County	1–2	Reading	iPro Stadium
15:00 GMT	Bent 61'	Report	Robson-Kanu 53'; Yakubu 82'	Attendance: 21,337; Referee: Craig Pawson

== Squad statistics ==
=== Appearances ===
Last updated: 10 May 2015

_{Note: Flags indicate national team as has been defined under FIFA eligibility rules. Players may hold more than one non-FIFA nationality.}

No.	Pos	Nat	Player	Total		Championship		FA Cup		League Cup	
No.	Pos	Nat	Player	Apps	Goals	Apps	Goals	Apps	Goals	Apps	Goals
1	GK	(England) ENG	Lee Grant	43	0	40	0	0	0	3	0
2	DF	(England) ENG	Cyrus Christie	44	0	34+4	0	2	0	4	0
3	MF	(Scotland) SCO	Craig Forsyth	51	1	44	1	1+1	0	5	0
4	MF	(Scotland) SCO	Craig Bryson	44	5	25+13	4	2	0	4	1
5	DF	(England) ENG	Jake Buxton	23	3	18+1	3	2	0	2	0
6	DF	(Republic of Ireland) IRL	Richard Keogh	53	0	45	0	3	0	5	0
7	FW	(Jamaica) JAM	Simon Dawkins	42	5	16+18	3	2+1	0	4+1	2
8	MF	(Republic of Ireland) IRL	Jeff Hendrick	47	9	34+7	7	2	0	3+1	2
9	FW	(Scotland) SCO	Chris Martin	42	21	31+4	18	1+1	1	3+2	2
10	FW	(Northern Ireland) NIR	Jamie Ward	29	6	21+4	6	1+2	0	1	0
11	FW	(Scotland) SCO	Johnny Russell	46	8	27+12	6	0+2	0	4+1	2
12	DF	(England) ENG	Lee Naylor	1	0	0	0	1	0	0	0
14	MF	(England) ENG	John Eustace	14	1	13	1	0	0	0+1	0
15	DF	(Republic of Ireland) IRL	Mark O'Brien	0	0	0	0	0	0	0	0
16	MF	(Scotland) SCO	Paul Coutts	9	0	0+7	0	1	0	0+1	0
16	MF	(England) ENG	Jesse Lingard	15	2	6+8	2	1	0	0	0
17	DF	(United States) USA	Zak Whitbread	11	0	8+1	0	0	0	2	0
18	FW	(Republic of Ireland) IRL	Conor Sammon	1	0	1	0	0	0	0	0
19	MF	(England) ENG	Will Hughes	48	3	38+4	2	1	1	4+1	0
20	FW	(England) ENG	Mason Bennett	2	0	0+2	0	0	0	0	0
21	GK	(Netherlands) NED	Kelle Roos	5	0	0	0	3	0	2	0
22	MF	(Kosovo) KOS	Alban Bunjaku	0	0	0	0	0	0	0	0
23	DF	(Wales) WAL	Kieron Freeman	0	0	0	0	0	0	0	0
23	FW	(England) ENG	Tom Ince	18	11	18	11	0	0	0	0
24	DF	(England) ENG	Tom Naylor	0	0	0	0	0	0	0	0
25	DF	(England) ENG	Shaun Barker	0	0	0	0	0	0	0	0
26	DF	(England) ENG	Jamie Hanson	2	1	2	1	0	0	0	0
27	MF	(Spain) ESP	Iván Calero	3	1	0+2	0	0	0	0+1	1
28	DF	(England) ENG	Farrend Rawson	0	0	0	0	0	0	0	0
29	FW	(England) ENG	Kwame Thomas	5	0	0+4	0	0+1	0	0	0
30	FW	(Ireland) EIR	Leon Best	20	0	0+15	0	1	0	2+2	0
30	DF	(Sweden) SWE	Isak Ssewankambo	0	0	0	0	0	0	0	0
31	FW	(Brazil) BRA	Alefe Santos	1	0	0	0	0	0	0+1	0
32	DF	(England) ENG	Ryan Shotton	29	2	23+2	2	2	0	2	0
33	MF	(Spain) ESP	Omar Mascarell	30	0	18+5	0	3	0	4	0
34	MF	(England) ENG	George Thorne	3	0	3	0	0	0	0	0
35	GK	(England) ENG	Jonathan Mitchell	0	0	0	0	0	0	0	0
36	GK	(England) ENG	Jack Butland	6	0	6	0	0	0	0	0
36	DF	(Spain) ESP	Raúl Albentosa	9	0	7+1	0	1	0	0	0
37	DF	(England) ENG	Stephen Warnock	8	0	6+1	0	1	0	0	0
39	FW	(England) ENG	Darren Bent	17	12	11+4	10	2	2	0	0
44	FW	(England) ENG	Jordon Ibe	24	5	13+7	5	0+1	0	1+2	0

=== Top scorers ===
Last updated: 10 May 2015

_{Note: Flags indicate national team as has been defined under FIFA eligibility rules. Players may hold more than one non-FIFA nationality.}

No.	Nationality	Name	Championship	FA Cup	League Cup	Total
9	(Scotland)	Chris Martin	18	1	2	21
39	(England)	Darren Bent	10	2	0	12
23	(England)	Tom Ince	11	0	0	11
8	(Republic of Ireland)	Jeff Hendrick	7	0	2	9
11	(Scotland)	Johnny Russell	6	0	2	8
10	(Northern Ireland)	Jamie Ward	6	0	0	6
44	(England)	Jordon Ibe	5	0	0	5
4	(Scotland)	Craig Bryson	4	0	1	5
7	(Jamaica)	Simon Dawkins	3	0	2	5
19	(England)	Will Hughes	2	1	0	3
5	(England)	Jake Buxton	3	0	0	3
30	(England)	Ryan Shotton	2	0	0	2
16	(England)	Jesse Lingard	2	0	0	2
27	(Spain)	Iván Calero	0	0	1	1
14	(England)	John Eustace	1	0	0	1
3	(Scotland)	Craig Forsyth	1	0	0	1
26	(England)	Jamie Hanson	1	0	0	1
Own goals			3	0	1	4
TOTAL			85	4	11	100

=== Disciplinary record ===
Last updated: 10 May 2015

_{Note: Flags indicate national team as has been defined under FIFA eligibility rules. Players may hold more than one non-FIFA nationality.}

No.	Nationality	Name	Championship		FA Cup		League Cup		Total	
No.	Nationality	Name	Yellow card	Red card	Yellow card	Red card	Yellow card	Red card	Yellow card	Red card
5	(England)	Jake Buxton	3	1	0	0	1	1	4	2
14	(England)	John Eustace	7	1	0	0	0	0	7	1
32	(England)	Ryan Shotton	5	1	0	0	0	0	5	1
37	(England)	Stephen Warnock	0	0	2	1	0	0	2	1
19	(England)	Will Hughes	9	0	1	0	0	0	10	0
2	(England)	Cyrus Christie	8	0	1	0	0	0	9	0
4	(Scotland)	Craig Bryson	8	0	1	0	0	0	9	0
33	(Spain)	Omar Mascarell	4	0	1	0	1	0	6	0
9	(Scotland)	Chris Martin	4	0	0	0	1	0	5	0
3	(Scotland)	Craig Forsyth	5	0	0	0	0	0	5	0
8	(Republic of Ireland)	Jeff Hendrick	5	0	0	0	0	0	5	0
6	(Republic of Ireland)	Richard Keogh	4	0	0	0	0	0	4	0
10	(Northern Ireland)	Jamie Ward	3	0	0	0	0	0	3	0
11	(Scotland)	Johnny Russell	3	0	0	0	0	0	3	0
17	(United States)	Zak Whitbread	2	0	0	0	0	0	2	0
44	(England)	Jordon Ibe	2	0	0	0	0	0	2	0
7	(Jamaica)	Simon Dawkins	2	0	0	0	0	0	2	0
23	(England)	Tom Ince	1	0	0	0	0	0	1	0
36	(Spain)	Raúl Albentosa	1	0	0	0	0	0	1	0
1	(England)	Lee Grant	1	0	0	0	0	0	1	0
16	(England)	Jesse Lingard	1	0	0	0	0	0	1	0
TOTAL			78	3	6	1	3	1	87	5

== League table ==
Pos	Team	Pld	W	D	L	GF	GA	GD	Pts	Promotion, qualification or relegation
6	Ipswich Town	46	22	12	12	72	54	+18	78	Qualification for Championship play-offs
7	Wolverhampton Wanderers	46	22	12	12	70	56	+14	78	
8	Derby County	46	21	14	11	85	56	+29	77	
9	Blackburn Rovers	46	17	16	13	66	59	+7	67	
10	Birmingham City	46	16	15	15	54	64	−10	63	

Updated to match(es) played on 2 May 2015. Source: Sky Sports
Rules for classification: 1) Points; 2) Goal difference; 3) Number of goals scored

== Club awards ==
Award	Winner
Player of the Year	Will Hughes
Young Player of the Year	Tom Ince
Players’ Player of the Year	Will Hughes
Goal of the Season	Jeff Hendrick
Highest Goalscorer	Chris Martin
Under 21s Player of the Year	Jamie Hanson
Scholar of the Year	Offrande Zanzala
