= Will Hughes =

English footballer

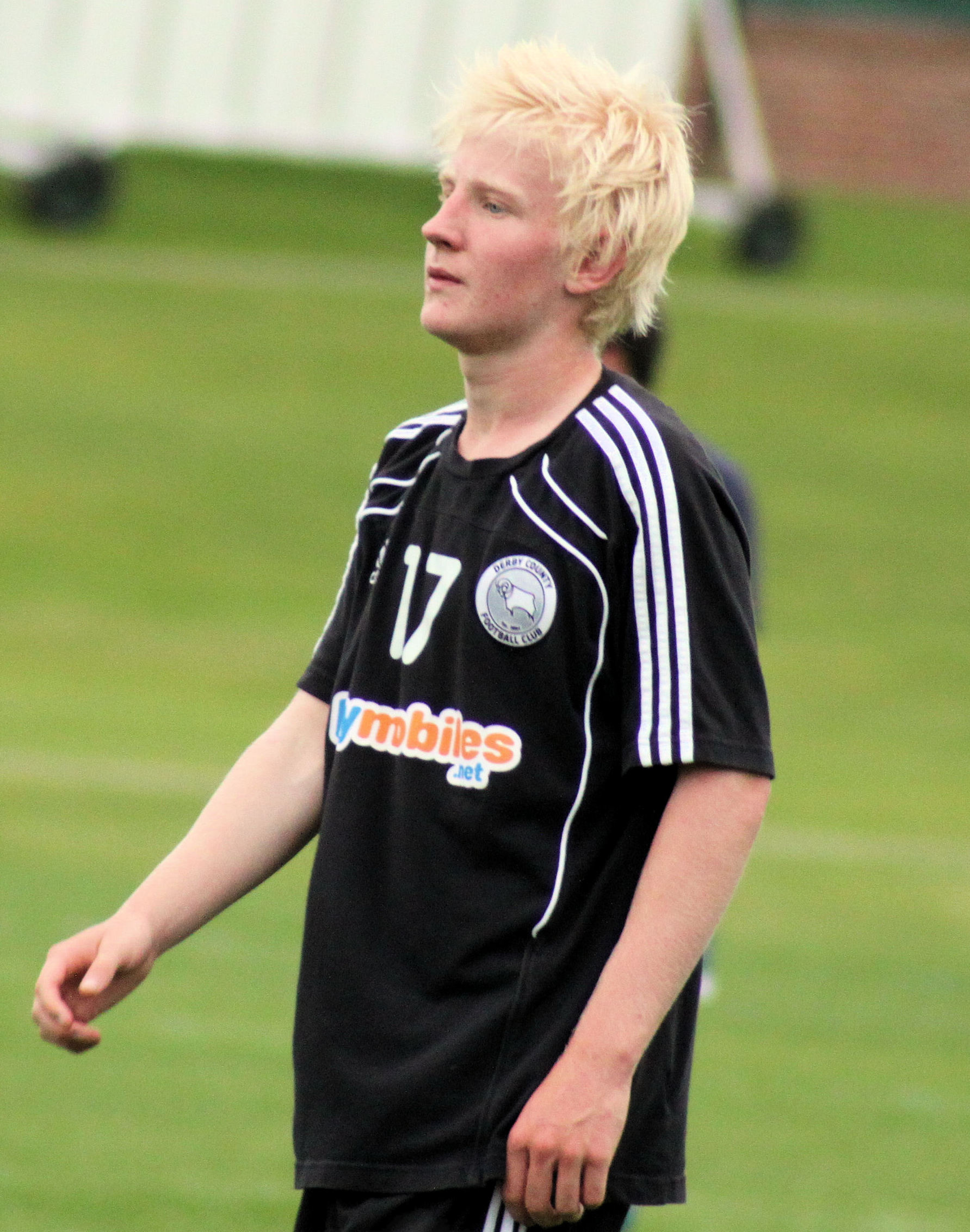
- Hughes with Derby County in 2011

Personal information
- Full name: William James Hughes
- Date of birth: 17 April 1995 (age 31)
- Place of birth: Weybridge, England
- Height: 6 ft 1 in (1.85 m)
- Position: Central midfielder

Team information
- Current team: Crystal Palace
- Number: 19

Youth career
- 2007–2011: Mickleover Jubilee
- 2011: Derby County

Senior career*
Years	Team	Apps	(Gls)
2011–2017	Derby County	165	(9)
2017–2021	Watford	107	(7)
2021–	Crystal Palace	140	(1)

International career
2012	England U17	6	(1)
2012–2017	England U21	23	(2)
- * Club domestic league appearances and goals as of 31 October 2026 (UTC)

William James Hughes (born 17 April 1995) is an English professional footballer who plays as a central midfielder for Premier League club Crystal Palace.

Having graduated a scholarship with Derby County, Hughes made his first team breakthrough during the 2012–13 season; his performances resulted in him earning attraction from multiple clubs across Europe. Hughes made his move to the Premier League with Watford in 2017, helping the Hornets reach the FA Cup final in 2019 and maintain top-flight football for three seasons. Following Watford's relegation in 2020, Hughes played a central role in their promotion campaign the following season. In 2021, he joined Crystal Palace, where he won the FA Cup in 2025.

== Early life ==
Born in Weybridge, Surrey, Hughes moved to Derby at the age of two. Hughes was first educated at St Peter's Junior school and then Repton School for secondary school in Derbyshire, where he was a boarder attending on a sports scholarship. Growing up, Hughes also played cricket and tennis. He played for Repton's football team, reaching the final of the Independent Schools Football Association Under-15 Cup in 2010, where he scored the first goal in a 3–1 extra-time defeat to Brentwood. Having briefly been on the books of Nottingham Forest, Hughes played for local side Mickleover Jubilee, before leaving Repton to sign for Derby County as a first-year scholar in the summer of 2011. While at Derby he completed A-Levels in politics and business with the help of tutors.

== Club career ==
=== Derby County ===
Hughes made his debut for the club's reserve team as a 70th minute substitute in a 6–1 Central League win over Walsall on 22 September 2011 and made two additional appearances in the Central League Cup. It was his "outstanding" performance in a 1–0 win over Port Vale reserves in the competition on 1 November which brought him to manager Nigel Clough's attention for possible inclusion in the Derby first-team squad against Peterborough United four days later.

Hughes made his full debut for Derby as a 90th-minute substitute for Jamie Ward. Despite entering the match late with the scores level, there was still time for Hughes' first-team debut to end in defeat as a 94th-minute goal saw Peterborough win 3–2.

After Derby midfielder Paul Green, who was out-of-contract at the end of the season, rejected a contract offer, Clough dropped him and promoted Hughes to the first-team squad as his replacement for the penultimate match of the season at Portsmouth. Hughes started the match on the substitute's bench and came on in the 68th minute, replacing Theo Robinson in a 2–1 win. Hughes started his first match for the senior team in the final match of the season, a 1–1 draw against Peterborough United. Hughes' performance match earned praise from Derby manager Nigel Clough. At Derby's awards night, Hughes won the Scholar of the Year Award.

After impressing in pre-season, Clough said that Hughes could be in line for a place in the starting line-up in the first match of the season against Scunthorpe United in the League Cup. Clough was particularly impressed with his substitute appearance against Colchester United saying, "When he came off the bench at Colchester, he was very good indeed. I thought he was the star of the subs. He looked comfortable. I don't think he gave the ball away and he made our equaliser. We are very pleased with him."

Hughes scored his first goal for the club in a 5–1 win against Watford on 1 September 2012. Hughes signed a new contract in October 2012, committing his future at the club until summer 2015. Hughes scored his second goal for the club in a 2–1 defeat at Millwall on 10 November, scoring an equalising goal from 20 yards. In November 2012, Hughes was linked with moves to Arsenal, Liverpool and Manchester City. Nigel Clough denied the rumours, however he said the interest in the player was inevitable and said many scouts had been at Derby matches to watch Hughes.

Hughes was named the Football League Young Player of the Month for November 2012, after a series of impressive performances. On the eve of the 2013 January transfer window, it was reported in the Derby Telegraph that Hughes was being closely observed by 10 Premier League clubs with Fulham's manager Martin Jol saying of Hughes, "Believe me, there are probably 10 clubs in the Premier League having a look at him. He is one of these wonderful talents, so he is always on lists. If you have a good scouting system, he will always be on the list but we will see."

In February 2013, during a 0–0 draw against Wolverhampton Wanderers, Hughes picked up a groin injury and was replaced after 63 minutes. As a result of this injury, Hughes ended his ever-present run of Derby first-team appearances after 35 matches and ended a run of 37 consecutive appearances. With twelve matches remaining in the season and with Derby unlikely to fight for a play-off place and with Hughes being ruled out for the first two matches in March; Clough said he considered resting Hughes for the rest of season to reduce stress on his body.

In April 2013, Hughes signed a one-year extension to his contract after his 18th birthday, extending his stay until June 2016. Hughes returned to first-team action before schedule on 20 April as an 85th-minute substitute in Derby's 3–1 against Peterborough United. At the end of the season, Hughes won the Sammy Crooks Young Player of the Year award.

Ahead of the 2013–14 season, Hughes was expected to compete with Craig Bryson, Paul Coutts and Jeff Hendrick, with then-manager Nigel Clough stating that rotation could be utilised. Hughes scored his first goal of the season on 27 August in a 5–0 win against League One side Brentford in the League Cup. He scored his first league goal of the season in a 3–1 defeat at home to Reading on 21 September. This was Hughes' last goal under Nigel Clough, who was sacked a week later following a 1–0 defeat at the hands of rivals Nottingham Forest in the East Midlands derby. Clough was replaced by former England manager Steve McClaren, and Hughes scored in his first match in charge of Derby; a 3–1 win against Leeds United. On 1 July 2014, Hughes agreed a new four-year contract at Derby County, which would see his contract at the club extended until the end of the 2017–18 season.

On 8 August 2015 in the season opener against Bolton, Hughes damaged his anterior cruciate ligaments in his right knee and was ruled out for six months. In April 2016, he rejoined the first-team squad at Derby after returning to full fitness.

Despite interest from Premier League giants Manchester United, Hughes remained at Derby for their 2016–17 Championship campaign, under new manager Nigel Pearson. The team's negative start at the start of the season saw Pearson sacked, with former manager Steve McClaren replacing him. On 13 January 2017, Hughes signed a new contract with Derby, running until the summer of 2020. McClaren was later replaced by Gary Rowett in March that year, with Derby going on to finish ninth in the Championship after an indifferent season. Hughes' final appearance for Derby was a 1–1 draw at relegated Rotherham United, coming on as a substitute at half-time for Craig Bryson. Hughes has stated that he stagnated at the end of his Derby career, and believes he wasn't manager Gary Rowett's "cup of tea".

=== Watford ===
On 24 June 2017, Hughes joined Premier League club Watford on a five-year contract for an undisclosed fee, reported to be around £8 million. Hughes became newly appointed manager Marco Silva's first signing of the season. He made his Premier League debut on 28 October 2017, coming on as a substitute for André Carrillo in the 80th minute, during a 1–0 defeat against Stoke City at Vicarage Road. Hughes then scored his first goal for the Hornets on 19 November that year, scoring the opener in a 2–0 victory over West Ham United.

Hughes was part of a Watford side that reached the FA Cup final at Wembley Stadium during the 2018–19 season, where they would be defeated 6–0 by domestic treble winners Manchester City in the final, Hughes having played all six matches during their FA Cup campaign. Despite their success, Watford were relegated to the Championship at the end of the following season. Hughes remained at Watford, playing a crucial role as Watford earned promotion back to the Premier League at the first time of asking, finishing the Championship league campaign as runners-up.

=== Crystal Palace ===
On 28 August 2021, Hughes signed a three-year deal with Premier League club, Crystal Palace. He made his debut for the club on 30 November as an 82nd minute substitute for Jeffrey Schlupp in a 1–0 defeat away to Leeds United.

On 20 March 2022, Hughes scored his first goal for Crystal Palace, scoring the 4th goal in a 4–0 victory over Everton in the 2021–22 FA cup quarter final.

On 28 May 2023, Hughes scored his first Premier League goal for Crystal Palace, scoring the equaliser in a 1–1 draw against Nottingham Forest in the last game of the 2022–23 season.

On 2 May 2024, Palace triggered an appearance clause in his original contract, confirming his stay at Selhurst Park until 2025.

On 15 April 2025, Hughes extended his deal with Palace until the summer of 2027. The next day, he made his 100th league appearance for Palace in a 5–0 defeat to Newcastle. On 17 May, Hughes came on as a second-half substitute as Palace won the 2025 FA Cup final against Manchester City, the club's first ever major trophy.

== International career ==
On 17 January 2012, Hughes was called up to the England U17 for the first time for the Algarve Tournament in February 2012, he was joined by his teammate Mason Bennett. Hughes appeared in all three match, as England won the three-match tournament with seven points. Hughes scored a goal in the 2–2 draw against Netherlands U17 on 4 February 2012. Hughes was also called up the 2012 UEFA European Under-17 Championship elite round in March 2012, however England failed to qualify for the main tournament, finishing third in their group on four points, with their exit confirmed in a 4–0 loss to Spain U17. In August 2012, Hughes was named as standby for the England U19 squad for a friendly against Germany U19 in September.

In November 2012, Hughes made his first appearance for the England U21 squad in a friendly against Northern Ireland U21 on 13 November. Hughes came on as a 65th-minute substitute for Josh McEachran, becoming the second youngest player to get capped for the U21s, beaten only by Theo Walcott. Derby youth academy director Darren Wassall praised Hughes after his call-up to the England U21 side, saying "It's a great achievement to get in at 17 and we are all delighted for him. To make that rise into the Under-21s so soon is fantastic for him and everyone at the club." Hughes called the experience "surreal". On 19 November 2013, Hughes scored his first goal for England U21 against San Marino U21.

Hughes claimed eligibility to play for the Wales national team through Welsh paternal grandparents in 2019. However, earlier research by the Football Association of Wales in 2015 concluded that only his great-grandparents were Welsh and therefore Hughes was ineligible to represent Wales.

== Style of play ==
Hughes has been described as a "flair player" who uses through balls and mazy runs to create space for teammates and beat opposition defences in attacking positions. He has expressed a "love of a challenge, a 50–50".

Hughes said in a December 2012 interview for the BBC, that he bases his play on Barcelona and Spanish international central midfielders Xavi and Andrés Iniesta. Hughes states his strengths are his passing and technical ability and targeted improvements in pace and physical strength. Growing up a Liverpool fan, his favourite player was Steven Gerrard, admiring his ability both in the tackle and as a playmaker.

Hughes' former England U21 coach Stuart Pearce described Hughes as "technically a very sound player". "He rarely gave the ball away in training or in the game he played [against Northern Ireland], which is vitally important at international level. He's progressing really well."

== Career statistics ==
As of match played 31 October 2026

Appearances and goals by club, season and competition
Club	Season	League			FA Cup		League Cup		Europe		Other		Total	
Club	Season	Division	Apps	Goals	Apps	Goals	Apps	Goals	Apps	Goals	Apps	Goals	Apps	Goals
Derby County	2011–12	Championship	3	0	0	0	0	0	—		—		3	0
Derby County	2012–13	Championship	35	2	2	0	1	0	—		—		38	2
Derby County	2013–14	Championship	41	3	1	0	3	1	—		3 (Note: Appearances in Championship play-offs)	1	48	5
Derby County	2014–15	Championship	42	2	1	1	5	0	—		—		48	3
Derby County	2015–16	Championship	6	0	0	0	0	0	—		2	0	8	0
Derby County	2016–17	Championship	38	2	1	0	3	0	—		—		42	2
Derby County	Total		165	9	5	1	12	1	—		5	1	187	12
Watford	2017–18	Premier League	15	2	0	0	1	0	—		—		16	2
Watford	2018–19	Premier League	32	2	6	1	2	0	—		—		40	3
Watford	2019–20	Premier League	30	1	0	0	1	0	—		—		31	1
Watford	2020–21	Championship	30	2	1	0	0	0	—		—		31	2
Watford	Total		107	7	7	1	4	0	—		—		118	8
Crystal Palace	2021–22	Premier League	16	0	4	1	0	0	—		—		20	1
Crystal Palace	2022–23	Premier League	27	1	1	0	2	0	—		—		30	1
Crystal Palace	2023–24	Premier League	30	0	2	0	1	0	—		—		33	0
Crystal Palace	2024–25	Premier League	33	0	4	0	4	0	—		—		41	0
Crystal Palace	2025–26	Premier League	31	0	1	0	3	0	12 (Note: Appearances in UEFA Conference League)	0	1 (Note: Appearance in FA Community Shield)	0	48	0
Crystal Palace	2026–27	Premier League	3	0	0	0	2	0	0	0	—		5	0
Crystal Palace	Total		140	1	12	1	12	0	12	0	1	0	177	2
Career total			412	17	24	3	28	1	12	0	6	1	482	22

== Honours ==
Watford

- FA Cup runner-up: 2018–19

Crystal Palace

- FA Cup: 2024–25
- FA Community Shield: 2025
- UEFA Conference League: 2025–26

Individual

- PFA Team of the Year: 2013–14 Championship
