= Ibrahim Touré =

Ibrahim Touré may refer to:

- Ibrahim Touré (footballer, born 1985) (1985–2014), Ivorian footballer
- Ibrahim Touré (footballer, born 1995), Dutch footballer
- Ibrahim Sory Touré (1970-1996), Malian footballer

== See also ==
- Ibrahima Touré (born 1985), Senegalese footballer
