= Alban Bunjaku =

Kosovan footballer

Personal information
- Date of birth: 20 May 1994 (age 32)
- Place of birth: Romford, England
- Height: 1.85 m (6 ft 1 in)
- Position: Attacking midfielder

Youth career
- Eastbrook
- –2002: Ascot United
- 2002–2012: Arsenal

Senior career*
Years	Team	Apps	(Gls)
2012–2014	Sevilla Atlético	10	(1)
2012–2013	→ Slavia Prague B (loan)	2	(0)
2014–2016	Derby County	0	(0)
2016	Dordrecht	9	(2)
Total		21	(3)

International career^{‡}
2014	Kosovo	2	(0)
- * Club domestic league appearances and goals as of 6 June 2016 ‡ National team caps and goals as of 05:15, 25 March 2020 (UTC)

Alban Bunjaku (born 20 May 1994) is a professional footballer who last played as an attacking midfielder for Dutch club Dordrecht. Born in England, he represented Kosovo at international level.

== Club career ==
=== Early career ===
Born in London, Bunjaku joined the Arsenal F.C. Academy in 2002, at the age of eight.

=== Sevilla ===
After scoring fifteen goals in twenty-three starts for the under-18 side, Bunjaku left Arsenal to sign for La Liga club Sevilla. He spent the 2012–13 season with the club's reserve side, Sevilla Atlético, in the Segunda División B. He made his debut on 14 October 2012 in the 8th game week against Cartagena, coming on as a substitute in the 89th minute in place of Álex Rubio. The match finished in a 2–2 draw. He scored first goal on 4 November 2012 in the 11th game week against Melilla and gave Sevilla Atlético the 0–1 away victory when he scored in the 53rd minute, but was replaced only 12 minutes later by Joaquín García.

=== Derby County ===
On 10 June 2014, it was announced that Bunjaku had returned to England to sign a two-year contract with Championship side Derby County. Head coach Steve McClaren said that Bunjaku had potential to do well at Derby, given his experience gained from a decade with Arsenal and also from his short time at Sevilla Atlético.

After spending time mainly with the under-21 side, Bunjaku left the club months before the end of his contract by mutual consent.

=== Dordrecht ===
On 18 January 2016, shortly after leaving Derby County, Bunjaku signed with Dordrecht of the Eerste Divisie. He made his debut for the club on the same day in a league match against Emmen. He came on as a 63rd-minute substitute for Ibrahim Touré as Dordrecht lost the match 2–0.

== International career ==
In January 2012, the media reported that the Albanian Football Association were trying to convince the player to be part of their national team, since the English Football Association had not made him any invitation to play in the England national side. He was called up to represent Albania under-19, after the English youth team overlooked him.

In May 2014, Bunjaku was called up to the Kosovo national football team for the friendly matches against Turkey and Senegal. On 21 May 2014, Bunjaku made his international debut for Kosovo against Turkey, coming on as a substitute in the 60th minute in place of Lum Rexhepi in a 1–6 loss at the Adem Jashari Olympic Stadium, Mitrovica, Kosovo.

== Career statistics ==
As of 13 September 2016

Club	Season	League			Cup		Europe		Total	
Club	Season	Division	Apps	Goals	Apps	Goals	Apps	Goals	Apps	Goals
Sevilla Atlético	2012–13	Segunda División B	10	1	0	0	-	-	10	1
Sevilla Atlético	Total		10	1	0	0	0	0	10	1
Slavia Prague B	2013–14	Czech Fourth Division					-	-		
Slavia Prague B	Total									
Derby County	2014–15	Football League Championship	0	0	0	0	-	-	0	0
Derby County	Total		0	0	0	0	0	0	0	0
Dordrecht	2015–16	Eerste Divisie	9	2	0	0	0	0	9	2
Dordrecht	Total		9	2	0	0	0	0	9	2
Career total			19	3	0	0	0	0	19	3

=== International ===
As of 25 May 2014

Kosovo national team
Year	Apps	Goals
2014	2	0
Total	2	0
