= Jamie Hanson =

English footballer (born 1995)

Personal information
- Full name: James William Hanson
- Date of birth: 10 November 1995 (age 30)
- Place of birth: Burton-upon-Trent, England
- Height: 5 ft 10 in (1.78 m)
- Positions: Defender; midfielder

Team information
- Current team: Long Eaton United

Youth career
- –2014: Derby County

Senior career*
Years	Team	Apps	(Gls)
2013–2018	Derby County	31	(1)
2017	→ Wigan Athletic (loan)	17	(0)
2018–2022	Oxford United	61	(0)
2023–2024	Ilkeston Town	8	(0)
2023–2024	→ Long Eaton United (loan)	18	(2)
2024–	Long Eaton United	10	(1)

International career
2015	England U20	4	(0)
- * Club domestic league appearances and goals as of 01:38, 15 May 2024 (UTC)

James William Hanson (born 10 November 1995) is an English professional footballer who plays as a defender or midfielder. He plays for Long Eaton United.

He has played previously for Derby County, Wigan Athletic, Oxford United and Ilkeston Town.

== Club career ==
=== Derby County ===
Hanson was a product of the Derby County academy with more than ten years at the club. He made his Football League debut for the Rams on 14 March 2015, starting against Norwich City in a 1–1 away draw at Carrow Road. In the 66th minute, with Derby 1–0 down, he swung in a corner kick and seemed to have scored the equalizing goal on his debut, but it was given as an own goal by Norwich goalkeeper John Ruddy, who fumbled it over the line. Derby later appealed the decision with the Football League, and the goal was credited to Hanson on 19 March, meaning that he had scored for the club on his professional debut. He played one more match in the 2014–15 season, playing 70 minutes in a 1–0 home defeat to Middlesbrough on 17 March.

Hanson played more regularly in the 2015–16 season; his first appearance came on 15 August, when he played for 90 minutes in a 1–1 draw against Charlton Athletic, at the base of Derby's midfield three. He started again on 18 August against Middlesbrough but had to be withdrawn after 39 minutes because of injury. He missed the next match because of it, but returned for the following match, a 2–1 home defeat to Leeds United on 29 August. He signed a new three-year contract with Derby on 7 September after which he made five more league appearances, all of them as a substitute.

=== Oxford United ===
Hanson signed for Oxford United on 9 August 2018, for an undisclosed fee, on a four-year contract. He made his debut in a 4–1 away defeat at Portsmouth in League One, conceding a penalty that was saved by keeper Jonathan Mitchell. Hanson was released by the club upon the end of his contract at the end of the 2021–22 season.

=== Non-league career ===
After a year out of the game, Hanson was signed by Northern Premier League club Ilkeston Town in the summer of 2023. On 1 November 2023, Hanson joined Southern League Premier Division Central club Long Eaton United on loan.

On 25 June 2024, Hanson made his move to Long Eaton United a permanent one.

== International career ==
On 19 March 2015, Hanson was named in the England under-20 squad for the first time, by manager Aidy Boothroyd, to face Mexico and the United States.

== Career statistics ==
As of match played on 27 April 2024

Appearances and goals by club, season and competition
Club	Season	League			FA Cup		League Cup		Other		Total	
Club	Season	Division	Apps	Goals	Apps	Goals	Apps	Goals	Apps	Goals	Apps	Goals
Derby County	2014–15	Championship	2	1	0	0	0	0	0	0	2	1
Derby County	2015–16	Championship	18	0	1	0	0	0	0	0	19	0
Derby County	2016–17	Championship	5	0	1	0	0	0	2 (Note: Appearances in the Football League Trophy)	1	8	1
Derby County	2017–18	Championship	6	0	1	0	0	0	1 (Note: Appearances in the Championship play-offs)	0	8	0
Derby County	Derby Total		31	1	3	0	0	0	3	1	37	2
Wigan Athletic (loan)	2016–17	League One	17	0	0	0	0	0	0	0	17	0
Oxford United	2018–19	League One	30	0	4	0	2	0	5	0	41	0
Oxford United	2019–20	League One	5	0	1	0	2	0	3 (Note: Two appearances in the Football League Trophy and one appearance in the League One play-offs)	0	11	0
Oxford United	2020–21	League One	24	0	0	0	0	0	6 (Note: 5 appearances in EFL Trophy and one appearance in the League One play-offs)	0	30	0
Oxford United	2021–22	League One	2	0	1	0	0	0	1	0	4	0
Oxford United	Oxford United Total		61	0	6	0	4	0	15	0	86	0
Ilkeston Town	2023–24	Northern Premier League	8	0	1	0	—		1 (Note: Appearances in the FA Trophy)	0	10	0
Long Eaton United (loan)	2023–24	Southern League Premier Division Central	18	2	0	0	—		0	0	18	2
Long Eaton United	2024–25	Northern Premier League Division One Midlands	10	1	0	0	—		0	0	10	1
Career total			145	4	10	0	4	0	19	1	178	5
