= Jonathan Mitchell (footballer) =

English footballer

Personal information
- Full name: Jonathan Philip Mitchell
- Date of birth: 24 November 1994 (age 31)
- Place of birth: Hartlepool, England
- Height: 5 ft 11 in (1.80 m)
- Position: Goalkeeper

Youth career
- –2012: Newcastle United

Senior career*
Years	Team	Apps	(Gls)
2012–2014	Newcastle United	0	(0)
2013	→ Workington (loan)	7	(0)
2013	→ Workington (loan)	7	(0)
2014–2021	Derby County	0	(0)
2016	→ Luton Town (loan)	5	(0)
2018	→ Oxford United (loan)	10	(0)
2019	→ Shrewsbury Town (loan)	9	(0)
2020	→ Macclesfield Town (loan)	11	(0)
2020–2021	→ Northampton Town (loan)	35	(0)
2021–2022	Hartlepool United	2	(0)
2022–2023	Doncaster Rovers	60	(0)
2023–2024	Harrogate Town	4	(0)
2024	Spennymoor Town	2	(0)

International career
2016	England U21	1	(0)
- * Club domestic league appearances and goals as of 11:30, 11 April 2025 (UTC)

Jonathan Philip Mitchell (born 24 November 1994) is an English professional footballer who plays as a goalkeeper.

He was previously with Newcastle United as a youth and reserve player, and has also played for Workington, Luton Town, Oxford United, Shrewsbury Town, Macclesfield Town, Northampton Town, Hartlepool United, Doncaster Rovers, Harrogate Town and Spennymoor Town.

== Early and personal life ==
Mitchell was born and raised in Hartlepool, and is a Hartlepool United supporter. He attended High Tunstall College of Science, where he captained the rugby team. In September 2021, Mitchell opened High Tunstall's new 3G pitch facility.

== Club career ==
Mitchell made his debut for Newcastle United's reserve team in January 2011 while still at school. He spent time on loan at Workington during the second half of the 2012–13 season, and returned to the club for a second loan spell in August 2013.

He was released by Newcastle in June 2014, signing immediately for Derby County. He said he was looking forward to working with Derby's goalkeeping coach Eric Steele. He made his professional debut on 9 January 2016 in the FA Cup against his hometown club Hartlepool United.

On 5 March, Mitchell joined League Two club Luton Town on loan until the end of the 2015–16 season. He made his debut on the same day in a 1–0 win away to Leyton Orient.

On 21 March, Mitchell was named in the Football League Team of the Week for his performance against Plymouth Argyle two days earlier when he made a number of saves, mostly notably from Graham Carey and Gregg Wylde, keeping a clean sheet to help Luton earn a 1–0 away win. Following an injury to Lee Grant, Derby recalled Mitchell early from his loan on 5 April.

He moved on loan to Oxford United in August 2018 as cover for the injured Simon Eastwood. He kept a clean sheet on his first-team debut (a 2–0 home victory over Coventry City in the EFL Cup) and saved a penalty on his league debut, a 4–1 away defeat at Portsmouth. Mitchell finished the loan with 15 appearances, with 10 of those appearances coming in the league.

In January 2019 he moved on loan to Shrewsbury Town. He signed on loan for Macclesfield Town in January 2020.

On 4 August 2020 he signed on loan for Northampton Town for the 2020–21 season.

On 14 June 2021 it was announced that he would leave Derby at the end of the season, following the expiry of his contract.

In August 2021 he signed for Hartlepool United. Mitchell made his Hartlepool debut in an EFL Cup defeat to Crewe Alexandra. He left Hartlepool on 19 January 2022.

On 21 January 2022, Mitchell joined League One club Doncaster Rovers on an eighteen-month deal. Mitchell was released at the end of the 2022–23 season.

In November 2023 he signed for Harrogate Town. He was released by Harrogate at the end of the 2023–24 season.

On 3 September 2024, it was announced that Mitchell had signed for National League North side Spennymoor Town. He made his debut on the same day in a 4–2 win against Radcliffe.

== International career ==
On 29 September 2016, Mitchell was called up to the England U21 squad for the first time for their 2017 UEFA European Under-21 Championship qualification matches against Kazakhstan and Bosnia and Herzegovina.

== Career statistics ==
As of 2 December 2023

Appearances and goals by club, season and competition
Club	Season	League			FA Cup		League Cup		Other		Total	
Club	Season	Division	Apps	Goals	Apps	Goals	Apps	Goals	Apps	Goals	Apps	Goals
Newcastle United	2012–13	Premier League	0	0	0	0	0	0	—		0	0
Newcastle United	2013–14	Premier League	0	0	0	0	0	0	—		0	0
Newcastle United	Total		0	0	0	0	0	0	—		0	0
Workington (loan)	2012–13	Conference North	7	0	—		—		—		7	0
Workington (loan)	2013–14	Conference North	7	0	—		—		—		7	0
Workington (loan)	Total		14	0	—		—		—		14	0
Derby County	2014–15	Championship	0	0	0	0	0	0	—		0	0
Derby County	2015–16	Championship	0	0	1	0	0	0	—		1	0
Derby County	2016–17	Championship	0	0	1	0	1	0	—		2	0
Derby County	2017–18	Championship	0	0	0	0	2	0	—		2	0
Derby County	2018–19	Championship	0	0	0	0	—		—		0	0
Derby County	2019–20	Championship	0	0	0	0	0	0	—		0	0
Derby County	2020–21	Championship	0	0	0	0	0	0	—		0	0
Derby County	Total		0	0	2	0	3	0	0	0	5	0
Luton Town (loan)	2015–16	League Two	5	0	0	0	0	0	—		5	0
Oxford United (loan)	2018–19	League One	10	0	0	0	3	0	2 (Note: Appearances in EFL Trophy)	0	15	0
Shrewsbury Town (loan)	2018–19	League One	9	0	—		—		—		9	0
Macclesfield Town (loan)	2019–20	League Two	11	0	—		—		—		11	0
Northampton Town (loan)	2020–21	League One	35	0	1	0	1	0	5	0	42	0
Hartlepool United	2021–22	League Two	2	0	1	0	1	0	4	0	8	0
Doncaster Rovers	2021–22	League One	18	0	0	0	0	0	—		18	0
Doncaster Rovers	2022–23	League Two	42	0	1	0	1	0	—		44	0
Doncaster Rovers	Total		60	0	1	0	1	0	0	0	62	0
Harrogate Town	2023–24	League Two	4	0	1	0	0	0	1	0	6	0
Career total			150	0	6	0	9	0	12	0	177	0
