= Steve McClaren =

English association football manager and former player

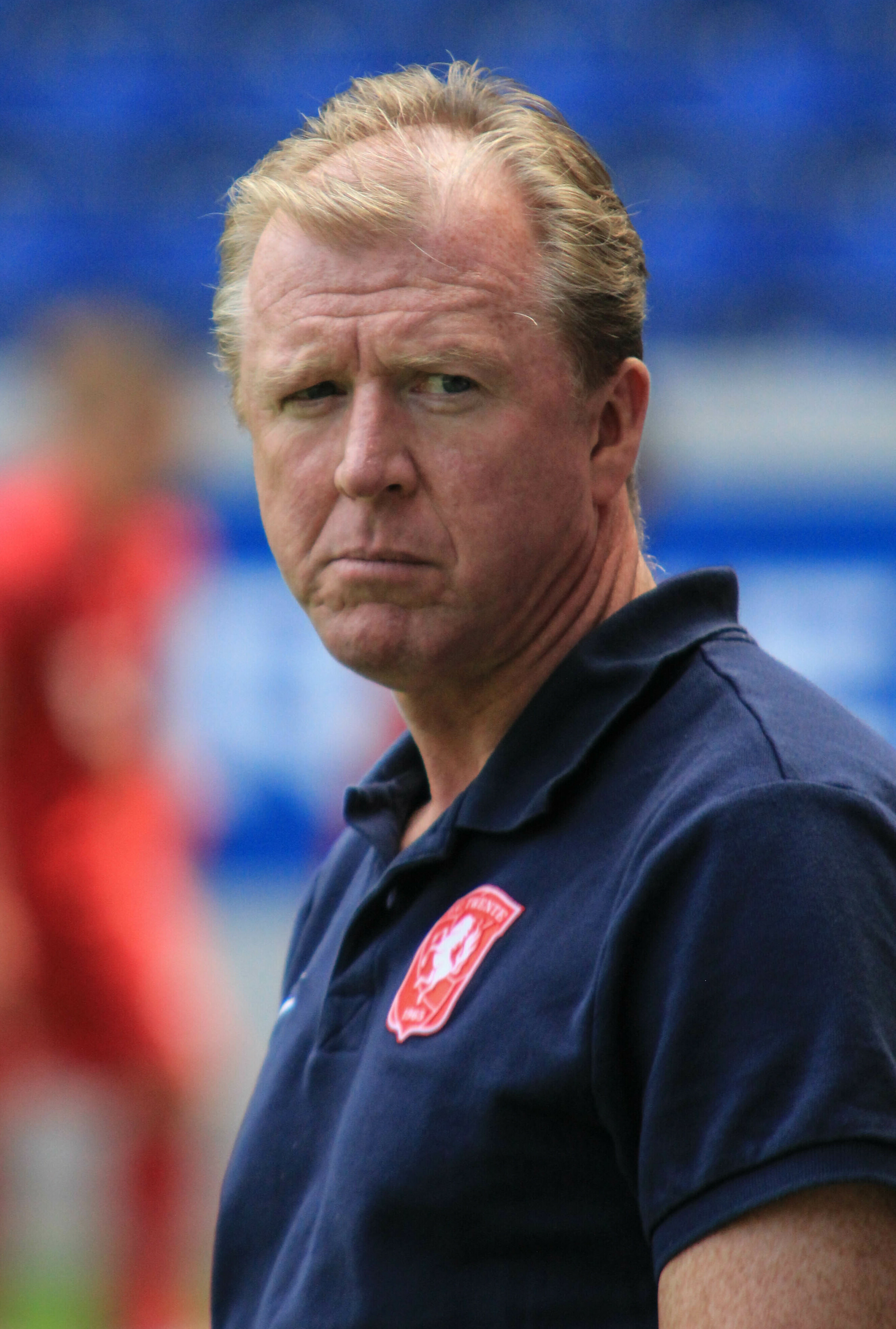
- McClaren as manager of Twente in 2012

Personal information
- Full name: Stephen McClaren
- Date of birth: 3 May 1961 (age 65)
- Place of birth: Fulford, England
- Height: 5 ft 7 in (1.70 m)
- Position: Midfielder

Team information
- Current team: Rotherham United (Director of Football)

Senior career*
| Years | Team | Apps | (Gls) |
| 1979–1985 | Hull City | 178 | (16) |
| 1985–1988 | Derby County | 25 | (0) |
| 1987 | → Lincoln City (loan) | 8 | (0) |
| 1988–1989 | Bristol City | 61 | (2) |
| 1989–1992 | Oxford United | 33 | (0) |
| Total | | 305 | (18) |

Managerial career
- 2001–2006: Middlesbrough
- 2006–2007: England
- 2008–2010: Twente
- 2010–2011: VfL Wolfsburg
- 2011: Nottingham Forest
- 2012–2013: Twente
- 2013–2015: Derby County
- 2015–2016: Newcastle United
- 2016–2017: Derby County
- 2018–2019: Queens Park Rangers
- 2024–2025: Jamaica
- 2026–: Rotherham United (director of football)
- * Club domestic league appearances and goals

Stephen McClaren (born 3 May 1961) is an English professional football coach and former player who is the Director of Football at EFL League Two club Rotherham United.

McClaren began his coaching career with Oxford United, before joining Derby County in 1995. In 1999, McClaren was hired by Manchester United to be Brian Kidd's replacement as Alex Ferguson's assistant manager. He held that position for two years, until he was hired as manager of Middlesbrough. During his tenure, Middlesbrough won their first major trophy, the League Cup in 2004. They were also UEFA Cup runners-up in 2006. McClaren was appointed manager of the England national team in August 2006, but was dismissed a year later after England failed to qualify for UEFA Euro 2008, with his tactics and player selections being subject to strong media criticism.

In 2008, McClaren was appointed manager of Dutch club Twente, with whom he won the club's first ever Eredivisie championship in 2010. Soon after, he took over at VfL Wolfsburg in Germany, though he was dismissed mid-season due to poor results. After a short spell as manager of Nottingham Forest, he returned to Twente in 2012. His second stint with Twente was less successful than his first, however, and McClaren resigned in early 2013. He returned to Derby later that year, leading the club to the play-offs in the 2013–14 season, but the club failed to win promotion, and he was dismissed in 2015. He was soon appointed head coach of Newcastle United, but was dismissed after less than a year after winning only six of his 28 Premier League matches in charge. He had a second spell as Derby manager from October 2016 to March 2017, and, in 2018, McClaren was appointed manager of Queens Park Rangers, before being dismissed in April 2019. He returned to management in 2024 as head coach of the Jamaica national team but resigned after failing to gain automatic qualification for the 2026 FIFA World Cup.

== Early life ==
McClaren was born on 3 May 1961 in Fulford, York, the son of Margaret (née Bogg) and Brian McClaren who had married the previous year. Described as "Yorkshire born and bred", McClaren's ancestors worked variously as miners, brewers, cotton mill workers, labourers and farmworkers, as well as in domestic service.

As a child, McClaren attended Nunthorpe Grammar School after passing his eleven-plus, preferring it over a closer school because of the emphasis which was placed on sports. In order to attend, he had to cycle a daily four-mile round trip across York. This is cited as an example of his determination to succeed in sport. At school, he played rugby, tennis, squash and was captain of the school's football team. He also played for York Boys under-15 team and represented the county of Yorkshire. Playing as midfielder, McClaren is remembered as being a "tidy" player, "skilful on the ball" and "head and shoulders above the rest."

== Playing career ==
As a player, McClaren was a midfielder who spent most of his career in the lower leagues of English football. The bulk of his playing career was with Hull City, who he joined in 1979 at the age of 18 after leaving school, He went on to play 178 games scoring 16 goals before leaving in 1985. He then played for Derby County between 1985 and 1988, making 25 appearances, with the team winning the second division football league during this time.

During 1987, he joined Lincoln City (on loan) making only eight appearances. In 1988, he moved to Bristol City and played 61 times, scoring two goals. He joined his final club, Oxford United, in 1989. He played 33 times for Oxford, before an injury forced him to retire in 1992.

== Managerial career ==
=== Early coaching ===
After retiring from playing, McClaren began his coaching career as a youth and reserve team coach at Oxford United, where Denis Smith was manager. He moved back to Derby County in 1995, where he was assistant manager to Jim Smith. The pair won promotion to the Premier League in their first season in charge, establishing themselves in this division and later enjoyed further consolidation in the top flight.

In early 1999, McClaren moved to Manchester United as assistant to Alex Ferguson, replacing Brian Kidd. At the time, he was so little known that he was introduced by United chairman Martin Edwards as "Steve McClaridge", perhaps confusing him with the former Leicester City striker Steve Claridge. His first half-season was distinguished by United winning the treble, consisting of the Premier League title, FA Cup and UEFA Champions League. He developed the reputation as one of the most tactically astute coaches in the country, using modern methods such as video analysis and sports psychologists. United later won the League titles in 2000 and 2001, thus ensuring they won every title contested while McClaren was at the club.

In October 2000, McClaren was made a coach in the England national team by caretaker-manager Peter Taylor. He retained the position under permanent manager Sven-Göran Eriksson until November 2002, combining the job with his roles at club level. However, he returned to assist Eriksson as assistant manager shortly before UEFA Euro 2004 as Brian Kidd had undergone surgery for prostate cancer. He remained in the role up to and including the 2006 FIFA World Cup finals.

=== Middlesbrough ===
At the end of the 2000–01 season, McClaren began looking for a managerial job, having decided his chances of succeeding Ferguson at Old Trafford were slim; at the time, Ferguson was planning to retire the following summer, but would ultimately remain in charge of United for a further 11 seasons. With a positive reputation and closely linked with three Premier League vacancies, Middlesbrough chairman Steve Gibson won the race to appoint him after McClaren turned down Southampton and West Ham United. His appointment came after the resignation of former Manchester United captain Bryan Robson, who had been in charge of the Teesside club for seven years and established them as a Premier League club. In his first season, Middlesbrough reached the FA Cup semi-final, knocking out his previous employers Manchester United in the fourth round, but lost 0–1 to Arsenal. They finished 12th in the league, a small improvement on the previous season's 14th-place finish. The following season brought another modest improvement, this time finishing 11th, although they had been in higher positions – and the race for a UEFA Cup place – for most of the season.

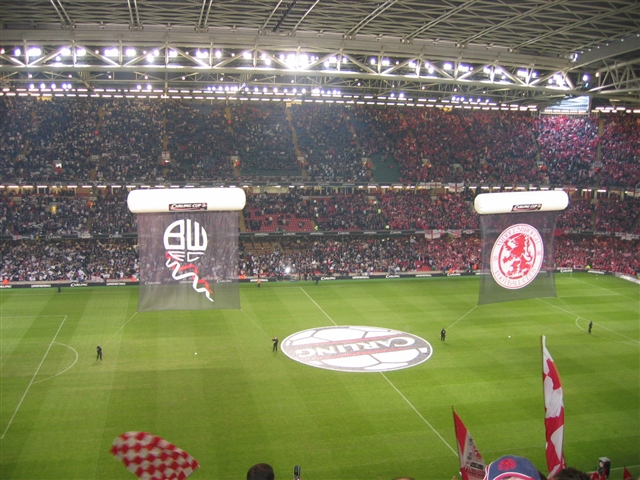
The 2004 League Cup Final between Middlesbrough and Bolton Wanderers at the Millennium Stadium

In the 2003–04 season, McClaren guided Boro to victory in the League Cup with a 2–1 win over Bolton Wanderers in the final. This was the club's first-ever major honour and also guaranteed them qualification for a European competition for the first time in their 128-year history. In the following close season, McClaren was able to attract proven players Jimmy Floyd Hasselbaink, Michael Reiziger and Mark Viduka to Middlesbrough. The signings paid dividends as the club reached the round of 16 in the UEFA Cup, having beaten more experienced sides such as Lazio, before being eliminated by Sporting CP. The club finished in seventh position in the Premier League – their best finish since 1975 – ensuring qualification for the UEFA Cup for a second successive season.

The 2005–06 season proved to be the most eventful of McClaren's tenure at Middlesbrough. The club endured mediocre league form, losing at home to local rivals Sunderland (who finished the season relegated with just three wins from 38 games) and suffering a 7–0 thrashing at Arsenal, putting the club in relegation form. During a 4–0 defeat at home to Aston Villa, a Middlesbrough fan ran onto the pitch and threw his season ticket at McClaren signifying his disgust at the club's performances. Boro eventually finished in a secure 14th place but enjoyed greater success in the cup competitions, reaching the latter stages of both the FA and UEFA Cups. They lost 0–1 to West Ham United in the FA Cup semi-finals. In the UEFA Cup, Middlesbrough were losing on aggregate in the second legs of both the quarter and semi-final ties against Basel and Steaua București respectively. After McClaren substituted defenders with attackers, Boro produced two spectacular four-goal comebacks in both ties to reach the final. In the final, however, Middlesbrough were outclassed by Sevilla and lost 4–0.

McClaren's five-year tenure on Teesside saw him establish himself as Middlesbrough's most successful manager as he made the often difficult transition from coach to manager. He was the first manager to guide them to a major trophy and the first to guide them to qualification for a European competition. He was also the most successful English manager of the early 21st century; he was the first Englishman to win a major honour since 1996 and first to reach a European final with an English club since 1985. Many Boro fans, however, were indifferent about his departure, believing Steve Gibson, the club chairman, to be more important to their success.

McClaren was accused by rival managers of having a "pot of gold" provided by Gibson to buy players, giving him an advantage over other teams, except perhaps the biggest few clubs in the league. Despite this, towards the latter end of his tenure, McClaren was criticised by some supporters for using negative tactics and earning Middlesbrough the tag of a "dull" side. Some observers attributed Middlesbrough's success to the senior, experienced players in the side, rather than McClaren's managerial ability.

=== England national team ===
After Eriksson announced in January 2006 that he would leave as England manager after the 2006 World Cup finals, McClaren was placed on the FA's shortlist to succeed him, alongside Sam Allardyce, Alan Curbishley, Martin O'Neill and Luiz Felipe Scolari. The FA first offered the position to Scolari, but he rejected the offer, claiming that the role would mean excessive media intrusion in his life. McClaren, however, was subsequently announced as Eriksson's successor on 4 May 2006 after signing a four-year contract. The nature of his appointment earned him the nickname "Second Choice Steve". The appointment was praised by the likes of Alex Ferguson and Trevor Brooking. McClaren assumed control of the national team on 1 August 2006. McClaren chose popular former England coach Terry Venables as his assistant, a move seen by some as an attempt to counter the lack of enthusiasm for McClaren. He also hired public relations guru Max Clifford to manage his relationship with the media.

McClaren's first decision was to choose the new England captain. He decided to give the arm band to John Terry, the Chelsea defender and captain who at the time had 24 England caps, saying: "I'm convinced he will prove to be one of the best captains England has ever had." In his first squad, McClaren dropped many of the national team's older players including Sol Campbell, David James and former captain David Beckham, saying he was planning for "a different direction". McClaren, however, stated that there was still a chance that Beckham could be recalled in the future.

After starting qualification for UEFA Euro 2008 well with two wins, England hit a poor run of form between October 2006 and March 2007 with only one goal scored in five matches, by which time they had fallen to fourth in their qualification group. During a match against Andorra in March 2007, McClaren and the England team received abuse from supporters during a poor performance in a 3–0 win. McClaren walked out of the post-match press conference after only two minutes of questions, saying, "Gentlemen, if you want to write whatever you want to write, you can write it because that is all I am going to say. Thank you."

In May 2007, McClaren made a U-turn by recalling David Beckham into the England squad. England subsequently had a run of four wins from six matches, which boosted the country's hopes of qualification for Euro 2008, before a defeat against Russia in October 2007 caused their qualification fate to fall out of their hands. The FA's chief executive, Brian Barwick, gave his backing to McClaren, despite the defeat. McClaren was also backed by players Phil Neville and Steven Gerrard, his predecessor Eriksson, and the chief executive of the League Managers Association, John Barnwell.

The results of other matches in England's qualification group meant that England would qualify as the second place team by avoiding a loss in their final group match against Croatia, who had already qualified for the tournament. They would also qualify if Russia failed to beat Andorra. The match was played at Wembley on 21 November 2007 and England lost 3–2; coupled with Russia's victory over Andorra, this meant that England failed to qualify for Euro 2008. It was the first time since the 1994 FIFA World Cup that England had not qualified for a major tournament, and the first time they had missed the European Championships since UEFA Euro 1984.

The following day, the FA held an emergency meeting and decided to sack McClaren from his post along with his assistant manager Terry Venables. There had been considerable media criticism over McClaren's tactics and player selection, particularly the poor results without Beckham in the lineup, and then having the inexperienced Scott Carson instead of Paul Robinson for the crucial match against Croatia. McClaren's tenure was the second shortest of any England manager, spanning just 18 games in 16 months, only superseded by Sam Allardyce's one game in 67 days. On 14 December 2007, the FA announced Fabio Capello as McClaren's replacement commencing from 7 January 2008.

=== Twente ===
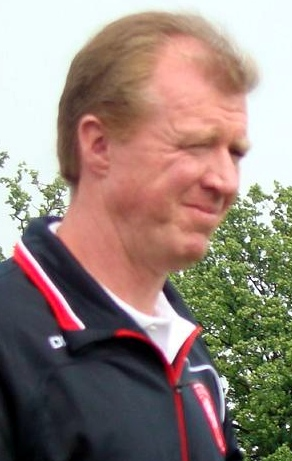
McClaren as manager of Twente in 2012

McClaren announced in February 2008 he would consider managing in either the Championship or abroad in his next job. In May 2008, McClaren was linked with a return to football as manager of the Dutch Eredivisie side Twente. He was in the crowd for a match against Ajax on 18 May, seeing Twente qualify for the Champions League. In response to speculation, a Twente spokesman initially stated that the club had no intention of hiring McClaren. Later that month, however, it was reported McClaren had held talks with Twente chairman Joop Munsterman and had toured the club, despite question marks from some Twente fans to his possible appointment. When he was initially offered the Twente managerial job, McClaren turned it down due to private issues, and on 7 June he expressed an interest in the vacant managerial role at Blackburn Rovers. On 20 June, however, he was confirmed as the new manager of Twente.

McClaren made a good start to the 2008–09 season. The club went on to secure second place in the Eredivisie behind winners AZ, reached the final of the KNVB Cup (losing on penalties to Heerenveen) and on the European front, the club survived group stages in the UEFA Cup, having beaten amongst others Racing de Santander and Schalke 04, managed by McClaren's predecessor at Twente, Fred Rutten. It was the first time in 30 years that the club had remained in European competition beyond winter. Twente were eventually knocked out on penalties in the Round of 32 by Marseille.

At the start of the 2009–10 campaign, McClaren's second season at Twente, there were question-marks over how well newcomers Bryan Ruiz and Miroslav Stoch would be able to replace the departed Eljero Elia and Marko Arnautović, who had been at the core of Twente's second-place finish in the league the preceding year. McClaren, however, led the team to some impressive results, with Twente reaching the top of the Eredivisie in October and remaining top throughout the next few months. Twente, which had never won an Eredivisie title in its history, continued to top the league in the latter part of the season, holding off the likes of renowned competitors PSV and Ajax, and seriously emerged as title favourites. They also reached the first knockout round of the inaugural Europa League, where they were defeated by Werder Bremen. McClaren signed a one-year extension to his contract in October 2009.

On 2 May 2010, Twente were crowned champions for the first time in their history after a 2–0 win away to NAC Breda. On winning the Eredivisie, McClaren became the first Englishman to manage a team to a top-level domestic league title since Bobby Robson with Porto in 1996 (Robson also won the Dutch title with PSV in 1991 and 1992). Robson had in fact been a major influence in McClaren's decision to go to the Netherlands. According to McClaren: "The relationship I had with Bobby was very special. He was a good friend and was of big influence on my decision to join Twente. I'd like to think that he'll be watching from a cloud up above and wishes us the best as we play the last game in the league against NAC."

Twente won 16 of 17 home matches in the Eredivisie league that season and lost just two away. Twente withstood immense pressure from Martin Jol's Ajax (who won their last 14 games in a row and had a goal difference of +86, more than double Twente's +40) during the second half of the season, and trumped the Amsterdam side by one point difference on the last day of the league to claim the title. Upon winning the championship, McClaren stated: "Winning the Carling Cup with Middlesbrough was special but this is pretty much right up at the top of anything I've ever done. To win a championship in a foreign country with foreign coaches, I think it's made me stronger."

At the end of the season, McClaren was awarded the Rinus Michels Award for Dutch manager of the season.

=== VfL Wolfsburg ===
Despite winning the Dutch league with Twente, McClaren left the club on 11 May 2010 to take over as manager of Bundesliga side VfL Wolfsburg, making him the first Englishman to manage a German top flight football club. Wolfsburg lost their first three league matches under McClaren – including a 2–1 injury time away loss to Bayern Munich on the opening day of the season, followed by a 4–3 home loss to Mainz 05 having led 3–0 after 30 minutes – but got off the mark with a 2–0 home win against Hannover 96. Wolfsburg then won their next two matches convincingly to rise to sixth in the table.

Despite struggling in the league, on 23 December 2010 the club publicly showed a vote of confidence in McClaren. Due to further poor results, however, on 7 February 2011, the board decided to dismiss McClaren with immediate effect.

=== Nottingham Forest ===
McClaren succeeded Billy Davies as manager of Nottingham Forest on 13 June 2011. McClaren made five signings by getting Andy Reid to return to his former club from Blackpool on a free transfer, Ishmael Miller from West Bromwich Albion for a fee of £1.2 million, Matt Derbyshire for an undisclosed fee from Olympiacos. George Boateng on a free transfer from Skoda Xanthi and Jonathan Greening from Fulham for a fee of £600,000. After Forest only won eight points from his first ten league games in charge, McClaren resigned as manager on 2 October 2011.

=== Return to Twente ===
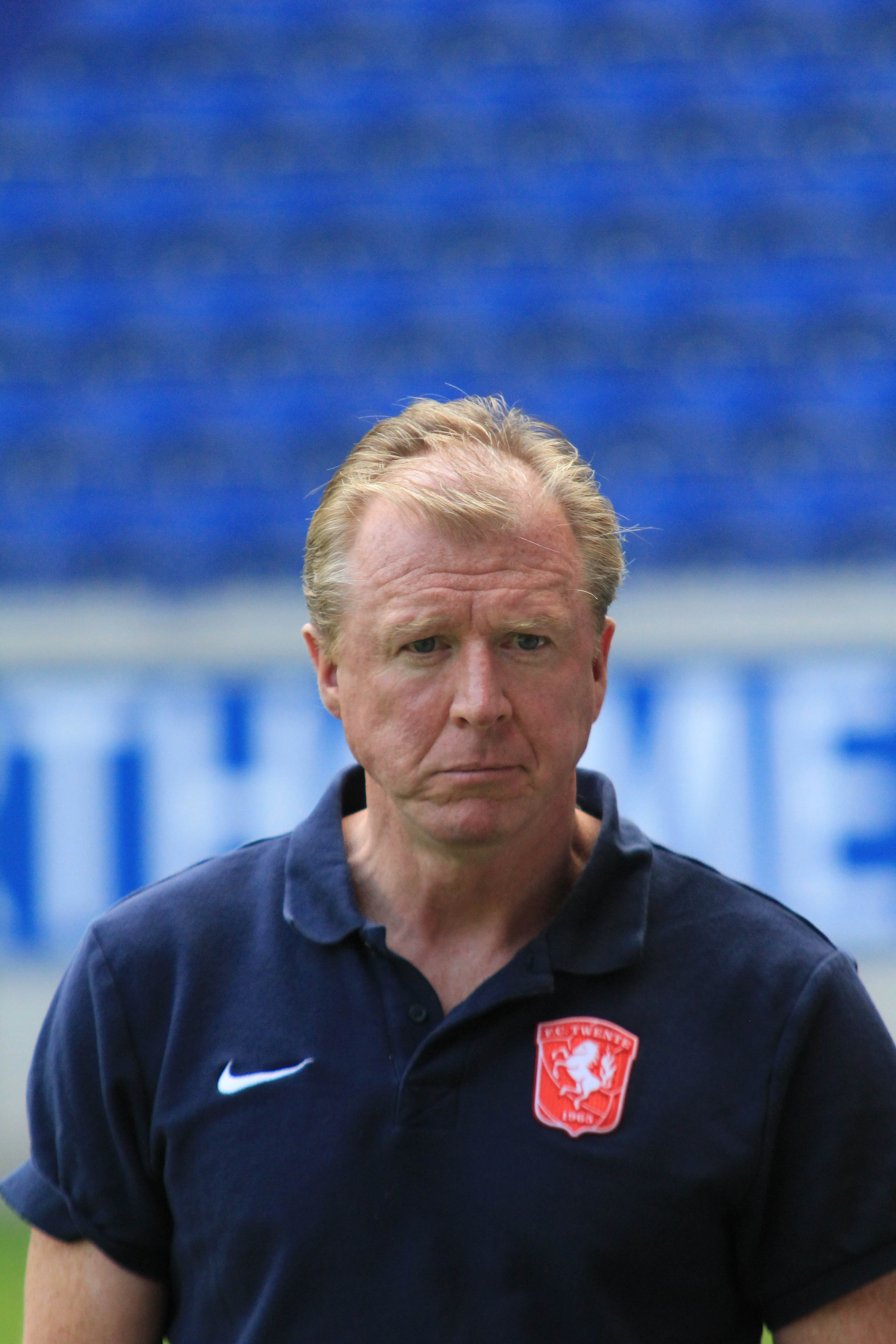
McClaren as manager of Twente in 2012

On 5 January 2012, Twente confirmed that McClaren had been appointed as the club's manager for the second time. In the press conference after being unveiled as manager, McClaren said his return to Twente was "an easy decision" to make, and wanted to set his sights on winning the Eredivisie title.

Twente defeated RKC Waalwijk 5–0 in McClaren's first match back as manager. His return was welcomed by the club's supporters, who wore "Welcome Back Steve" T-shirts during the game. In the January transfer window, McClaren caused controversy when he sold one of their best strikers, Marc Janko, to Porto for approximately £5 million. Despite this, McClaren invested money to sign Wesley Verhoek from ADO Den Haag for £1.5 million (a player McClaren had previously tried to sign while in charge at Nottingham Forest but the proposed deal fell through) and Glynor Plet from Heracles Almelo for £1.5 million.

After a disappointing sixth place, Twente invested in new players including Dušan Tadić and Luc Castaignos. Twente made it through the group stages of the Europa League, while winning the first six league matches. After growing criticism from supporters, McClaren resigned his position on 26 February 2013, stating: "We agree the club is bigger than any one individual and Twente is too big in my heart to stand in the way of its progress."

=== Derby County ===
In September 2013, McClaren returned to Derby County when he was appointed head coach to replace Nigel Clough, signing a two-and-a-half-year contract. He appointed former Derby winger Paul Simpson and former Manchester United goalkeeping coach Eric Steele to his backroom staff. Derby's first match following McClaren's appointment was at home to Ipswich Town, though academy manager Darren Wassall took charge of the team. With Derby trailing 4–1 at half time, McClaren entered the home dressing room to give a "rousing" speech to inspire a Derby fight back for a 4–4 draw. McClaren's first two games in charge brought successive victories, as he earned Derby their first league home win of the season with a tenth successive victory over Leeds United (3–1) and inflicted Watford's first home defeat of the season with a 3–2 away win. The Watford victory earned McClaren the LMA Performance of the Week award.

After Derby picked up 19 points from a possible 21 in December 2013, McClaren was awarded the Championship Manager of the Month award. Derby went on to finish third in the Championship in the 2013–14 season, amassing 85 points and qualifying for the Championship play-offs. After beating Brighton & Hove Albion over two legs in the semi-finals, Derby faced McClaren's former employers QPR in the final at Wembley Stadium, where they lost 1–0 to a last minute Bobby Zamora goal. This left Derby's quest for a return to the Premier League extending into its seventh season.

Derby enjoyed a strong opening two-thirds of the 2014–15 season, topping the table on three separate occasions and reaching the League Cup quarter-finals. However, after a 2–0 victory over Charlton Athletic on 24 February took Derby to the top of the division, their form nose-dived and they managed just two wins, against eventually relegated Wigan Athletic and Blackpool, in their remaining 13 fixtures. Despite the loan signings of Darren Bent, Tom Ince and Jesse Lingard, they missed out on the play-offs altogether after a 3–0 defeat at home to Reading on the last day of the season, when a point would have sufficed. The drastic loss in form was attributed by McClaren to injuries to key players, especially striker Chris Martin, although local press also believed that constant speculation linking McClaren to the Newcastle United job had been a contributing factor. On 25 May 2015, McClaren was dismissed by Derby.

=== Newcastle United ===
On 10 June 2015, McClaren was appointed as the replacement for caretaker manager John Carver as head coach of Premier League side Newcastle United. He signed a three-year deal with the club, with an option to extend the contract to eight years. He was also appointed to the Newcastle United board of directors, along with chief scout Graham Carr and club ambassador Bobby Moncur. On 18 October, after eight matches without a win, McClaren won his first Premier League game as manager of Newcastle with a 6–2 home victory against Norwich City. This was McClaren's first win in the Premier League since his Middlesbrough side beat West Ham 2–0 on 17 April 2006.

Six days after a 3–1 home defeat to AFC Bournemouth, McClaren was dismissed by Newcastle on 11 March 2016.

=== Return to Derby County ===
McClaren returned to Derby on 12 October 2016 for a second spell as manager, after the departure of Nigel Pearson. His first game in charge during his second spell was a 1–0 home win against Leeds United. In his early months, McClaren was able to guide Derby away from the relegation zone and towards the play-off positions. He was dismissed on 12 March 2017 after a 3–0 loss to Brighton.

=== Queens Park Rangers ===
On 18 May 2018, McClaren was appointed as the new manager of Championship club Queens Park Rangers on a two-year contract, replacing Ian Holloway, who was dismissed by the club a week previously after a poor run of results in their previous league campaign.

McClaren was dismissed as QPR manager on 1 April 2019 following a 2–1 home defeat to Bolton Wanderers on 30 March 2019 and a run of one win in 15 games.

=== Jamaica national team ===
On 31 July 2024, McClaren was named as the national coach of the Jamaican men's team. McClaren's first game in charge was a 0–0 draw with Cuba. His first win came four days later, as his side defeated Honduras 2–1. With McClaren as head coach, Jamaica qualified for the CONCACAF Gold Cup. In June 2025 at the final tournament of the CONCACAF Gold Cup Jamaica was knocked out after the group stage with one win and two defeats. On 19 November 2025, despite earning a place in the inter-confederation play-offs for a chance to compete at the 2026 FIFA World Cup, McClaren voluntarily resigned as Jamaican national coach after the team missed out on direct qualification to the tournament, drawing 0–0 at home with Curaçao in the final match of Group B. Jamaica would ultimately not qualify for the tournament, losing 1–0 to DR Congo after extra time in their qualification final match.

== Other roles ==
In May 2008, McClaren had a brief spell coaching then League Two side Darlington, assisting his former Derby County and Oxford United teammate Dave Penney. In April 2008, the BBC announced McClaren would join them as a pundit for Euro 2008, working as analyst and co-commentator for BBC Radio 5 Live, alongside Alan Green, one of his harshest critics as England manager. McClaren's first commentary game was Austria–Croatia on 8 June 2008, Croatia having been the team chiefly responsible for England's non-qualification for the tournament, having beaten England twice in qualifying.

On 2 July 2013, McClaren became part of Harry Redknapp's coaching staff at Queens Park Rangers in the Championship after agreeing a short-term, three-month deal.

In August 2017, McClaren joined Maccabi Tel Aviv as a coaching consultant. He vacated the post on 28 December. McClaren called his tenure a "wonderful experience," described Israel and Tel Aviv as "a special place," and said he would return to visit when Maccabi win the championship.

McClaren returned to Derby County on 24 November 2020 when being appointed as technical director. He stepped down from this role on 28 September 2021 after Derby entered administration, but remained at the club as a part-time senior adviser.

On 23 May 2022, it was confirmed that McClaren would be returning to Manchester United to join first team manager Erik ten Hag as part of his backroom coaching staff.

On 20 May 2026, McClaren was appointed as Head of Football at Rotherham United in a newly-created role, joining the League Two club following their relegation from League One. Tasked with providing strategic leadership across the club's football operations, his immediate responsibility was to lead the recruitment process for a new first team head coach, working alongside Director of Football Recruitment Rob Scott on player recruitment and squad planning. The appointment was announced by Chairman Tony Stewart as part of a wider restructuring effort following a difficult campaign.

== Personal life ==
McClaren is married to Kathryn, with whom he has three sons. As of 2006, McClaren lived in the town of Yarm in Stockton-on-Tees.

== Managerial statistics ==
As of match played 19 November 2025

Managerial record by team and tenure
| Team | From | To | Record | | | | | Ref. |
| Team | From | To | G | W | D | L | Win % | Ref. |
|---|---|---|---|---|---|---|---|---|
| Middlesbrough | 12 June 2001 | 11 May 2006 | 250 | 97 | 60 | 93 | 38.80 | |
| England | 1 August 2006 | 22 November 2007 | 18 | 9 | 4 | 5 | 50.00 | |
| Twente | 20 June 2008 | 11 May 2010 | 101 | 64 | 20 | 17 | 63.37 | |
| VfL Wolfsburg | 11 May 2010 | 7 February 2011 | 24 | 7 | 8 | 9 | 29.17 | |
| Nottingham Forest | 13 June 2011 | 2 October 2011 | 13 | 3 | 3 | 7 | 23.08 | |
| Twente | 5 January 2012 | 26 February 2013 | 63 | 30 | 17 | 16 | 47.62 | |
| Derby County | 30 September 2013 | 25 May 2015 | 95 | 51 | 22 | 22 | 53.68 | |
| Newcastle United | 10 June 2015 | 11 March 2016 | 31 | 7 | 6 | 18 | 22.58 | |
| Derby County | 12 October 2016 | 12 March 2017 | 29 | 13 | 7 | 9 | 44.83 | |
| Queens Park Rangers | 18 May 2018 | 1 April 2019 | 46 | 16 | 9 | 21 | 34.78 | |
| Jamaica | 1 August 2024 | 19 November 2025 | 24 | 13 | 5 | 6 | 54.17 | |
| Total | | | 693 | 308 | 162 | 223 | 44.44 | |

== Honours ==
=== Player ===
Hull City

- Associate Members' Cup runner-up: 1983–84

Derby County

- Football League Second Division: 1986–87

=== Manager ===
Middlesbrough

- Football League Cup: 2003–04
- UEFA Cup runner-up: 2005–06

Twente

- Eredivisie: 2009–10
- KNVB Cup runner-up: 2008–09

Individual

- Rinus Michels Award: 2010
