= Ibrahim Touré (footballer, born 1995) =

Dutch-Guinean footballer

Personal information
- Full name: Ibrahima Sory Touré
- Date of birth: 1 January 1995 (age 31)
- Place of birth: Conakry, Guinea
- Position: Attacking midfielder

Youth career
- 2008–2014: Dordrecht

Senior career*
Years	Team	Apps	(Gls)
2014–2017	Dordrecht	39	(2)
2017–2018	Cambuur	0	(0)
2018–2019	TOP Oss	1	(0)
2019–2023	SteDoCo	69	(5)
2024–2025	VV Capelle		
2025–2026	ASWH		
- * Club domestic league appearances and goals as of 08:41, 11 September 2026 (UTC)

Ibrahima Sory Touré (born 1 January 1995) is a Guinean-Dutch footballer who plays as a midfielder.

== Career ==
Touré played professionally with FC Dordrecht, SC Cambuur, and TOP Oss. During these years, he played 7 senior games in the Eredivisie (all with FC Dordrecht) and 33 senior games in the Eerste Divisie, as well as on under-23 teams.

In September 2019, Touré joined Dutch Derde Divisie club SteDoCo. In the 2024–2025 season, he played for VV Capelle. In May 2025, he signed with the Derde Divisie-side ASWH. In September 2026, two games into his second season at ASWH, he quit for "personal reasons".
