= Eric Steele =

English football player and coach

Personal information
- Full name: Eric Graham Steele
- Date of birth: 14 May 1954 (age 72)
- Place of birth: Wallsend, England
- Height: 6 ft 0 in (1.83 m)
- Position: Goalkeeper

Youth career
- Newcastle United

Senior career*
Years	Team	Apps	(Gls)
1973–1977	Peterborough United	124	(0)
1977–1979	Brighton & Hove Albion	87	(0)
1979–1984	Watford	51	(0)
1983	→ Cardiff City (loan)	7	(0)
1984–1987	Derby County	47	(0)
1987–1988	Southend United	27	(0)
1988	→ Mansfield Town (loan)	5	(0)
Total		348	(0)
- * Club domestic league appearances and goals

Eric Graham Steele (born 14 May 1954) is an English former footballer who played as a goalkeeper. He is currently employed as a goalkeeping coach by the Football Association, working with England's junior teams.

== Career ==
Steele began his playing career as a goalkeeper at Newcastle United in 1972, where he was part of the squad that won the Anglo-Italian Cup and won caps at England under-18 level. He then joined Peterborough United, and established himself as first-choice 'keeper, setting a record for most consecutive league appearances (124). That record would later be beaten by another Peterborough player, George Boyd (144). He does however, continue to hold the most consecutive appearances in all competitions for the Posh (148). He later joined Brighton & Hove Albion, Watford and Derby County, winning five promotions in 12 years with those clubs.

In 1988, he retired to run a pub, before establishing Eric Steele Coaching Services, which provided goalkeeping coaching to Manchester City, Leeds United, Derby County, and Barnsley, as well as working overseas in Australia, Switzerland, Norway, Germany and the USA.

Steele was at Huddersfield Town as goalkeeping coach and left at the end of the 1997/98 season when he joined Derby County when they came calling again in 1998, and he spent four years coaching there before being appointed goalkeeping coach at Aston Villa in 2001. Steele left his post at Aston Villa in 2006.

In 2006, Steele visited Australia, where he worked with junior and senior goalkeepers in Victoria and Perth. He worked with well-known coaches and helped improve Australian goalkeepers.

In 2007, he became the new Manchester City goalkeeping coach, following the departure of Tim Flowers to Coventry City as assistant to Iain Dowie.

Steele left his job at City on 27 June 2008 after being part of the backroom team under managers Stuart Pearce and Sven-Göran Eriksson. Mark Hughes, who had left Blackburn Rovers to take charge of Manchester City, brought with him Kevin Hitchcock, replacing Steele as goalkeeping coach. Paul Ince soon appointed him as goalkeeping coach at Blackburn Rovers. However, just weeks after joining Blackburn, Steele attracted the attention of Manchester United, who had been in search of a new goalkeeping coach since Tony Coton had been forced to retire through injury.

In preparation for Steele's departure, Blackburn signed Bobby Mimms from Wolverhampton Wanderers as their new goalkeeping coach. Manchester United confirmed the signing of Steele on 4 August.

Steele left United after David Moyes took over as manager in 2013.

On 30 September 2013, Steele returned to Derby County when he was appointed goalkeeping coach by the Championship club's newly installed manager, Steve McClaren, the former England team boss.

In July 2015, Steele was engaged by the Football Association to coach goalkeepers across their junior teams.
