= 2013–14 Derby County F.C. season =

Derby County
2013–14 season
- Chairman: Andy Appleby
- Manager: Nigel Clough (until 28 September); Steve McClaren (from 30 September)
- Stadium: iPro Stadium
- Championship: 3rd
- Play-offs: Final
- FA Cup: Third round
- League Cup: Third round
- Jack Stamps Trophy: Craig Bryson
- Top goalscorer: League: Chris Martin (22) (including play-offs); All: Chris Martin (25) (including play-offs)
- Highest home attendance: 33,004 vs. Nottingham Forest, 22 March 2014
- Lowest home attendance: 18,578 vs. Brentford, 27 August 2013, League Cup
- Average home league attendance: 24,933 (not including play-offs)
Home colours	Away colours	Third colours

The 2013–14 season was the 108th season in the Football League and 115th season overall of association football played by Derby County F.C., an English football club based in Derby, Derbyshire. Their tenth-place finish in the 2012–13 season meant it was their sixth consecutive season in the second tier, and their 46th overall.

== Overview ==
Derby County played their league games in the Championship in the 2013–14 season, the fixtures were announced on 19 June 2013. The season began on 3 August 2013 and the regular season concluded on 3 May 2014. The season was extended because Derby competed in the play-offs which meant the season ended on 24 May 2014 in the 2013–14 play-off final.

Derby entered the League Cup in the first round, the draw for this was announced on 17 June 2014. They were drawn against Oldham away who they beat 1–0. In the second round they faced Brentford F.C., who they defeated 5–0. The team were out of the competition after losing 2–1 to Leicester City in the third round.

Derby entered the FA Cup at the third round stage. In the draw, they were picked to play Premier League side Chelsea at home

=== Pre-season ===
In early April 2013, it was confirmed by the club that ten youth team players had signed professional terms with Derby County. After completing two-year scholarships; goalkeeper Ross Etheridge, defenders Dylan Hayes, Sam Berry and Josh Lelan, midfielders Rhys Sharpe, Niall Dawkins, Andy Dales, Ayrton Wassall and attacker Adam Wixted were all given deals. First year scholar defender Jamie Hanson; who featured in matchday squads for the first team in the second half of the previous season was also offered terms. Nigel Clough also admitted interested in Blackpool's out of contract defender Alex Baptiste but dismissed interest in Motherwell's Jamaican international winger Chris Humphrey. Birmingham City winger Chris Burke, Burnley goalkeeper Lee Grant and Norwich City striker James Vaughan, the latter two who had previously played for the Rams, were also speculated as possible transfer targets.

Ahead of Derby's final League game of the previous season it was announced that veteran Welsh defender Gareth Roberts would be released in the summer after the expiration of his contract. Grant became the first signing of the summer, rejoining Derby on a three-year contract six years after he was released. Nigel Clough stated that Grant was signed as the new first choice goalkeeper, with Saul Deeney and Mats Mørch being second and third choice respectively, with Mørch set to feature for the under-21 side. Frank Fielding and Adam Legzdins were made available for transfer, whilst Ross Atkins was reported to be joining fellow Derbyshire outfit Alfreton Town on loan. Defenders Tom Naylor and James O'Connor, midfielder James Bailey and strikers Theo Robinson and Nathan Tyson were made available for transfer. Former loan player Chris Martin joined the club on a free transfer from Norwich City on a two-year contract. Midfielder Ben Davies extended his contract by a year. Contract talks were also underway with midfielder Craig Bryson, however Clough had fears that right-back John Brayford would join a Premier League club.

Towards the end of May, Derby released their retained list where Roberts' departure was confirmed, but Ross Atkins, Saul Deeney, Conor Doyle and Michael Hoganson were all give new one-year deals, with Atkins and Doyle being made available for loan. Bryson's contract talks ended with the Scotsman signing a new three-year contract. Derby had bid for Dundee United striker Johnny Russell with a bid being rejected in late May, however an improved offer of £750,000 was accepted in early June, with the player joining Derby on a four-year contract.

On 17 June, the first round draw of the League Cup was made, with Derby drawing League One outfit Oldham Athletic away. In mid-June, Derby accepted a fee for transfer-listed goalkeeper Frank Fielding from Bristol City of League One, a move which was confirmed a week later for a fee of around £200,000. At the end of the month, Wigan Athletic had a bid of £1m for John Brayford turned down. Two long-speculated transfers were confirmed at the start of July, with goalkeeper Ross Atkins joining Alfreton Town on loan and former loanee Craig Forsyth rejoins the club from Watford on a three-year contract for a reported fee of £150,000.

As the players reported back from the post-season break, the club confirmed that ex-Watford midfielder John Eustace, a player who had a previous loan spell at the Rams in 2009 and American college winger Marcus Selandy-Defour had before joined the club on trials. Conor Doyle, a player who struggled to break into the Derby team was linked with Major League Soccer's Colorado Rapids for a six-month loan, however the MLS rules on player registrations complicated the move. He later joined D.C. United on a loan until the start of December, when a buying option for D.C. lapses. Derby won their first pre-season game at Irish-based Bohemians 6–1 through a brace from Johnny Russell, with returning loanee Callum Ball, Ben Davies, Paul Coutts and Conor Sammon netting the other four in the second half. They then took on Port Vale with a "weaker" starting lineup according to Clough. Despite this, they took the lead in the second minute with a Michael Jacobs penalty. Vale scored three goals without reply in 30 minutes. Michael Hoganson and Jeff Hendrick both scored early in the second half to level the score, with Russell and Craig Forsyth scoring late in half to ensure a 5–3 Derby win. Derby kept their 100% pre-season record going with a 2–0 win at Bristol Rovers through goals from Jamie Ward and Russell, his fourth goal in three pre-season games. A Derby XI then beat non-league Buxton 4–1, with transfer-listed Theo Robinson scoring a hattrick. The following day, Selandy-Defour completed his trial and returned to America. On 23 July, Derby beat Burton Albion 2–0 with goals from Chris Martin and Conor Sammon. The following day, Eustace signed a one-year deal with the club. On 25 July, a £1.5 million bid from Premier League newcomers Cardiff City was accepted for right-back John Brayford, with move being completed the following day. Derby were denied a 100% pre-season record, after losing 2–0 at home in their final pre-season friendly to West Bromwich Albion. Tottenham Hotspur right-back Adam Smith joined the club on a season-long loan deal on 29 July. Striker Callum Ball joined League Two outfit Torquay United on a two-month youth loan.

=== August ===
A day before the fixture release day of 19 June, it was announced that Derby County would start their season with a match against Blackburn Rovers at Pride Park, as part of the Football League's 125th anniversary. Derby took the lead through a 43rd-minute penalty form debutant Johnny Russell after a handball from Alex Marrow, Leon Best scored a late equaliser on 89 minutes. In the first League Cup match of the season against Oldham, Derby made six changes from the previous league match and booked their place into the 2nd round for the first time in five years through a Michael Jacobs 20th-minute goal. Two days later in the second round draw, Derby draw another League One side; Brentford at home with the game being played in late August. Derby wouldn't have to wait long for their first league, as they won at Brighton & Hove Albion 2–1 in a come from behind win with a Chris Martin double, trumping a Leonardo Ulloa opener. Out of favour defender Tom Naylor joined League Two newcomers Newport County on loan until early January 2014. Transfer listed striker Theo Robinson let the club to join Doncaster Rovers for a fee of £150,000. Meanwhile, young Norwegian goalkeeper Mats Mørch joined Burton Albion on a months loan. Derby lost 1–0 at home to rivals Leicester City after a Lee Grant own goal. In late August, it was reported that out of favour defender James O'Connor was training with Bristol City of League One with the view of a permanent transfer. Derby however, won consecutive away games, after beating Yeovil Town 3–0 in the first meeting between the clubs through late first half goals from Johnny Russell and Craig Bryson, with Chris Martin rounding out the scoring on 58 minutes. Derby then scored a comfortable passage into the third round of the League Cup with goals from Chris Martin, Conor Sammon and Will Hughes in the first half and Sammon and Martin again in the second half to complete a 5–0 win. Derby then drew Leicester City away for the third round. However, the club's disappointing home league form continued with Derby's August programme finishing with a 3–0 defeat to Burnley through first half Danny Ings and Sam Vokes, with Johnny Russell having a penalty saved by Tom Heaton halfway through the second half, with Jason Shackell finishing the scoring for the visitors on 74 minutes. Derby ended the month 14th in the table on 7 points. Hendrick missed the game with after picking up chipped ankle bone injury in the Yeovil, with a scan revealing damage worse than expected and was later ruled out for 12 weeks.

=== September ===
On transfer deadline day, two of Derby's transfer listed players left the club, with James O'Connor on loan deal until 13 January with Bristol City, with a view to a permanent transfer. Nathan Tyson joined Blackpool on a free transfer. After the international break, Derby returned to league action with a visit to Millwall and with a 5–1 win, Derby won their opening three away league games for the first time in 101 years and it was also the first time they won on road for three games in succession since February 2004, Craig Bryson scored his first career hattrick in the game which was also Derby's first league hattrick by a player since Paul Simpson in April 1996. Jake Buxton opening the scoring, with Shane Lowry being sent off for serious foul play at 2–0, Martyn Waghorn got Millwall's goal to make it 3–1, Mason Bennett scored his first league goal late on to complete the scoring. Derby's winning run on the road ended three days later after a 2–2 draw at basement side Bolton Wanderers, with Alex Baptiste and Chris Eagles first half goals being sandwiched by a Johnny Russell brace.

== Transfers ==
_{Note: Flags indicate national team as has been defined under FIFA eligibility rules. Players may hold more than one non-FIFA nationality.}

=== Transfers in ===
Date	Pos.	Name	From	Fee	Ref.
1 July 2013	GK	Lee Grant (ENG)	Burnley	Free	
1 July 2013	FW	Chris Martin (ENG)	Norwich City	Free	
1 July 2013	FW	Johnny Russell (SCO)	Dundee United (SCO)	£750,000	
1 July 2013	DF	Craig Forsyth (SCO)	Watford	£150,000	
24 July 2013	MF	John Eustace (ENG)	Watford	Free	
9 November 2013	MF	Kalifa Cissé (MLI)	New England Revolution (USA)	Free	
27 February 2014	MF	Lee Naylor (ENG)	Accrington Stanley	Free	

=== Transfers out ===
Date	Pos.	Name	To	Fee	Ref.
30 June 2013	DF	Gareth Roberts (WAL)	Bury	Free	
30 June 2013	GK	Frank Fielding (ENG)	Bristol City	£200,000	
14 July 2012	DF	Luke Adams (NZL)	Wellington Phoenix (NZL)	Free	
26 July 2012	DF	John Brayford (ENG)	Cardiff City	£1.5 million	
15 August 2013	FW	Theo Robinson (JAM)	Doncaster Rovers	£150,000	
2 September 2013	FW	Nathan Tyson (ENG)	Blackpool	Free	

=== Loans in ===
Date from	Pos.	Name	From	Duration	Ref.
29 July 2013	DF	Adam Smith (ENG)	Tottenham Hotspur	Season-long^{1}	
30 September 2013	DF	Zak Whitbread (USA)	Leicester City	31 December 2013	
18 October 2013	FW	Simon Dawkins (ENG)	Tottenham Hotspur	18 January 2014	
22 October 2013	FW	Andre Wisdom (ENG)	Liverpool	Season-long	
28 November 2013	DF	Michael Keane (ENG)	Manchester United	2 January 2014	
3 January 2014	FW	Patrick Bamford (ENG)	Chelsea	Season-long	
30 January 2014	MF	George Thorne (ENG)	West Bromwich Albion	Season-long	

=== Loans out ===
Date from	Pos.	Name	To	Date until	Ref.
1 July 2013	GK	Ross Atkins (ENG)	Alfreton Town	Season-long	
18 July 2013	FW	Conor Doyle (USA)	D.C. United (USA)	1 December 2013	
1 August 2013	FW	Callum Ball (ENG)	Torquay United	7 October 2013	
12 August 2013	DF	Tom Naylor (ENG)	Newport County	Early January 2014	
17 August 2013	GK	Mats Mørch (NOR)	Burton Albion	14 September 2013	
2 September 2013	DF	James O'Connor (ENG)	Bristol City	13 January 2014	
11 November 2013	MF	Michael Jacobs (ENG)	Wolverhampton Wanderers	2 January 2014	
12 November 2013	DF	Kieron Freeman (ENG)	Notts County	24 December 2014	
28 November 2013	FW	Callum Ball (ENG)	Notts County	2 January 2014	

- 1 = Loan terminated by mutual consent on 30 November 2013

== First team squad ==
- Ages and appearance stats correct as of final day of the season.
- Last updated: 24 May 2014

No.	Name	Nationality	Date of Birth (Age)	Signed from	Signed in	Contract ends	Apps.	Goals
Goalkeepers
1	Lee Grant	(England)	27 January 1983 (aged 31)	(England) Burnley	2013	2016	132	0
13	Saul Deeney	(Republic of Ireland)	23 March 1983 (aged 31)	Unattached	2009	2014	3	0
24	Mats Mørch	(Norway)	8 September 1993 (aged 20)	Trainee	2012		0	0
26	Adam Legzdins	(England)	28 November 1986 (aged 27)	(England) Burton Albion	2011	2014	37	0
Defenders
2	Adam Smith	(England)	29 April 1991 (aged 23)	(England) Tottenham Hotspur	2013	2014	10	0
3	Craig Forsyth	(Scotland)	24 February 1989 (aged 25)	(England) Watford	2013	2016	63	2
5	Shaun Barker	(England)	19 September 1982 (aged 31)	(England) Blackpool	2009	2015	105	6
6	Richard Keogh	(Republic of Ireland)	11 August 1986 (aged 27)	(England) Coventry City	2012	2015	96	6
12	Lee Naylor	(England)	19 March 1980 (aged 34)	Unattached	2014	2014	4	0
15	Mark O'Brien	(Republic of Ireland)	20 November 1992 (aged 21)	Trainee	2009	2015	35	0
17	Kieron Freeman	(Wales)	21 March 1992 (aged 22)	(England) Nottingham Forest	2012	2016	27	0
21	Valentin Gjokaj	(Albania)	23 August 1993 (aged 20)	Unattached	2012	2014	6	0
23	Michael Hoganson	(England)	3 December 1993 (aged 20)	Unattached	2012	2014	4	0
25	Jake Buxton	(England)	4 March 1985 (aged 29)	(England) Burton Albion	2009	2015	132	10
27	Zak Whitbread	(United States)	4 March 1984 (aged 30)	(England) Leicester City	2013	2014	4	1
33	Andre Wisdom	(England)	9 May 1993 (aged 21)	(England) Liverpool	2013	2014	38	0
38	Michael Keane	(England)	11 January 1993 (aged 21)	(England) Manchester United	2013	2014	8	0
	Tom Naylor	(England)	28 June 1991 (aged 22)	(England) Mansfield Town	2012	2015	10	0
	James O'Connor	(England)	20 November 1984 (aged 29)	(England) Doncaster Rovers	2012	2014	23	1
Midfielders
4	Craig Bryson	(Scotland)	6 November 1986 (aged 27)	(Scotland) Kilmarnock	2011	2016	134	27
7	Paul Coutts	(Scotland)	22 July 1988 (aged 25)	(England) Preston North End	2012	2015	58	2
8	Jeff Hendrick	(Republic of Ireland)	31 January 1992 (aged 22)	Trainee	2010	2015	129	15
12	Michael Jacobs	(England)	4 November 1991 (aged 22)	(England) Northampton Town	2012	2015	47	3
14	John Eustace	(England)	3 November 1979 (aged 34)	Unattached	2013	2014	48	2
16	Ben Davies	(England)	27 May 1981 (aged 32)	(England) Notts County	2011	2014	82	7
19	Will Hughes	(England)	7 April 1995 (aged 19)	Trainee	2011	2016	89	7
30	James Bailey	(England)	18 September 1988 (aged 25)	(England) Crewe Alexandra	2010	2014	64	1
34	Kalifa Cisse	(Mali)	9 January 1984 (aged 30)	Unattached	2013	2014	3	0
34	George Thorne	(England)	4 January 1993 (aged 21)	(England) West Bromwich Albion	2014	2014	12	2
Forwards
9	Chris Martin	(England)	4 November 1988 (aged 25)	(England) Norwich City	2013	2015	64	27
10	Jamie Ward	(Northern Ireland)	12 May 1986 (aged 28)	(England) Sheffield United	2011	2014	120	28
11	Johnny Russell	(Scotland)	8 May 1990 (aged 24)	(Scotland) Dundee United	2013	2017	43	9
18	Conor Sammon	(Republic of Ireland)	13 April 1987 (aged 27)	(England) Wigan Athletic	2012	2016	89	13
20	Mason Bennett	(England)	15 July 1996 (aged 17)	Trainee	2011	2016	32	2
22	Callum Ball	(England)	8 October 1992 (aged 21)	Trainee	2010	2014	31	3
32	Simon Dawkins	(England)	1 December 1987 (aged 26)	(England) Tottenham Hotspur	2013	2016	30	4
35	Patrick Bamford	(England)	5 September 1993 (aged 20)	(England) Chelsea	2014	2014	23	8
	Conor Doyle	(United States)	13 October 1991 (aged 22)	(United States) Creighton Bluejays	2010	2014	23	0

== League table ==
Pos	Team	Pld	W	D	L	GF	GA	GD	Pts	Promotion, qualification or relegation
1	Leicester City (C, P)	46	31	9	6	83	43	+40	102	Promotion to the Premier League
2	Burnley (P)	46	26	15	5	72	37	+35	93	Promotion to the Premier League
3	Derby County	46	25	10	11	84	52	+32	85	Qualification for Championship play-offs
4	Queens Park Rangers (O, P)	46	23	11	12	60	44	+16	80	Qualification for Championship play-offs
5	Wigan Athletic	46	21	10	15	61	48	+13	73	Qualification for Championship play-offs

Source: BBC Sport
Rules for classification: 1) points; 2) goal difference; 3) number of goals scored
(C) Champions; (O) Play-off winners; (P) Promoted

== Results ==
Win	Draw	Loss

=== Friendlies ===
7 May 2013 Andrew Corbett; Testimonial	Burton Albion XI	8–8	Derby County	Pirelli Stadium
19:30	Harrad 17', 65'; Goodfellow 57'; Corbett 72', 90+2' (pen.); Pearson 82'; Kee 85'; Sharkey 87'	Report	Ward 20'; Davies 22'; Sammon 27'; Robinson 51', 53', 87'; Tyson 56', 76'

13 July 2013	Bohemians (Republic of Ireland)	1–6	Derby County	Dalymount Park
15:00	Lyons 15'	Report	Russell 9', 26'; Ball 49'; Davies 50'; Coutts 76'; Sammon 79'

16 July 2013	Port Vale	3–5	Derby County	Vale Park
19:30	Pope 15', 30'; Robertson 28'	Report	Jacobs 2' (pen.); Hoganson 50'; Hendrick 54'; Russell 74'; Forsyth 83'	Attendance: 2,408 (663 away fans)

19 July 2013	Bristol Rovers	0–2	Derby County	Memorial Stadium
19:45		Report	Ward 35'; Russell 52'	Attendance: 1,945 (281 away fans)

20 July 2013	Buxton	1–4	Derby County XI	The Silverlands
19:45	Niven 26'	Report	Robinson 10', 24', 80'; Jacobs 36'	Attendance: N/A

23 July 2013	Burton Albion	0–2	Derby County	Pirelli Stadium
19:45		Report	Martin 45'; Sammon 89'	Attendance: 3,627

27 July 2013	Derby County	0–2	West Bromwich Albion	Pride Park Stadium
15:00		Report	Dorrans 39'; Rosenberg 89'	Attendance: 7,663 (1,412 away fans); Referee: Christopher Sarginson

30 July 2013	Matlock Town	0–3	Derby County XI	Causeway Lane
19:45		Report	Jacobs 51' (pen.); Robinson 67', 90'

13 August 2013 Bass Charity Vase; Final	Burton Albion	3–2	Derby County	Pirelli Stadium
19:45	Spillane 45'; Symes 49'; Knowles 89'	Report	Bennett 6'; Russell 17'	Attendance: 785; Referee: Andre Marriner

=== Football League Championship ===
Round	1	2	3	4	5	6	7	8	9	10	11	12	13	14	15	16	17	18	19	20	21	22	23	24	25	26	27	28	29	30	31	32	33	34	35	36	37	38	39	40	41	42	43	44	45	46
Ground	H	A	H	A	H	A	A	H	A	H	H	A	H	A	H	A	A	H	H	A	H	A	A	H	A	H	A	H	A	H	A	H	A	H	H	A	H	A	H	A	A	H	A	H	H	A
Result	D	W	L	W	L	W	D	L	L	D	W	W	D	L	W	W	W	W	W	W	W	D	W	L	L	W	D	W	D	W	W	W	L	L	D	D	W	L	W	L	W	W	W	W	W	D
Position	11	4	10	8	14	7	8	11	14	14	10	8	8	11	9	7	5	4	4	4	4	4	2	4	4	4	4	4	4	4	3	3	3	3	3	3	3	4	4	4	3	3	3	3	3	3

Source: Statto
A = Away; H = Home; W = Win; D = Draw; L = Loss

4 August 2013 1	Derby County	1–1	Blackburn Rovers	Pride Park Stadium
16:00	Russell 43' (pen.)	Report	Best 89'	Attendance: 21,188 (746 away fans); Referee: Stuart Attwell

10 August 2013 2	Brighton & Hove Albion	1–2	Derby County	Falmer Stadium
15:00	Ulloa 17'	Report	Martin 27', 47'	Attendance: 26,238 (1,046 away fans); Referee: Andy D'Urso

17 August 2013 3	Derby County	0–1	Leicester City	Pride Park Stadium
15:00		Report	Grant 37' (o.g.)	Attendance: 23,437; Referee: Robert Madley

24 August 2013 4	Yeovil Town	0–3	Derby County	Huish Park
15:00		Report	Russell 42'; Bryson 45'; Martin 58'	Attendance: 7,074 (1,750 away fans); Referee: Keith Hill

31 August 2013 5	Derby County	0–3	Burnley	Pride Park Stadium
15:00		Report	Ings 14'; Vokes 32'; Shackell 72'	Attendance: 23,514; Referee: Andy Madley

14 September 2013 6	Millwall	1–5	Derby County	The Den
15:00	Waghorn 75'	Report	Buxton 9'; Bryson 45', 57', 81'; Bennett 86'	Attendance: 9,523 (663 away fans); Referee: Keith Stroud

17 September 2013 7	Bolton Wanderers	2–2	Derby County	Reebok Stadium
19:45	Baptiste 5', Eagles 41'	Report	Russell 7', 18'	Attendance: 14,260 (654 away fans); Referee: Scott Mathieson

21 September 2013 8	Derby County	1–3	Reading	Pride Park Stadium
15:00	Hughes 80'	Report	Pogrebnyak 47', 62'; Blackman 95'	Attendance: 21,465 (779 away fans); Referee: Tim Robinson

28 September 2013 9	Nottingham Forest	1–0	Derby County	City Ground
12:15	Hobbs 41'	Report		Attendance: 28,276 (1,951 away fans); Referee: Simon Hooper

1 October 2013 10	Derby County	4–4	Ipswich Town	Pride Park Stadium
19:45	Whitbread 12'; Bryson 47', 88'; Ward 61'	Report	Berra 7'; Murphy 9', 34'; Cresswell 14'	Attendance: 21,037 (599 away fans); Referee: Trevor Kettle

5 October 2013 11	Derby County	3–1	Leeds United	Pride Park Stadium
15:00	Martin 20'; Russell 23'; Hughes 78'	Report	Pearce 45'	Attendance: 26,204; Referee: Geoff Eltringham

19 October 2013 12	Watford	2–3	Derby County	Vicarage Road
15:00	Forestieri 12'; McGugan 68'	Report	Ward 8', 47'; Sammon 88'	Attendance: 16,180 (1,550 away fans); Referee: James Linington

26 October 2013 13	Derby County	1–1	Birmingham City	Pride Park Stadium
15:00	Ward 39'	Report	Novak 66'	Attendance: 27,141; Referee: Roger East

2 November 2013 14	Queens Park Rangers	2–1	Derby County	Loftus Road
15:00	Jenas 11'; Eustace 63' (o.g.)	Report	Dawkins 23'	Attendance: 18,171; Referee: Jon Moss

9 November 2013 15	Derby County	3–0	Sheffield Wednesday	Pride Park Stadium
15:00	Buxton 45'; Hughes 49'; Martin 58'	Report		Attendance: 26,421 (3,715 away fans); Referee: David Webb

23 November 2013 16	Bournemouth	0–1	Derby County	Dean Court
15:00		Report	Ward 61'	Attendance: 10,720 (1,391 away fans); Referee: Stephen Martin

1 December 2013 17	Wigan Athletic	1–3	Derby County	DW Stadium
15:00	Powell 50'	Report	Bryson 3'; Dawkins 15'; Martin 29' (pen.)	Attendance: 15,097 (2,346 away fans); Referee: David Coote

4 December 2013 18	Derby County	2–1	Middlesbrough	Pride Park Stadium
19:45	Martin 45'; Sammon 90'	Report	Whitehead 74'	Attendance: 24,631 (546 away fans); Referee: Andrew Madley

7 December 2013 19	Derby County	5–1	Blackpool	iPro Stadium
12:15	Martin 47' (pen.), 53', 69' (pen.); Bryson 57'; Keogh 90+2'	Report	Osbourne 3'	Attendance: 24,063 (348 away fans); Referee: Andy Haines

14 December 2013 20	Charlton Athletic	0–2	Derby County	The Valley
15:00		Report	Ward 32'; Bryson 87'	Attendance: 16,871 (1,833 away fans); Referee: Andy Davies

21 December 2013 21	Derby County	3–1	Doncaster Rovers	iPro Stadium
15:00	Ward 13'; Dawkins 50'; Bryson 78'	Report	Buxton 64' (o.g.)	Attendance: 26,314 (628 away fans); Referee: Nigel Miller

26 December 2013 22	Huddersfield Town	1–1	Derby County	John Smith's Stadium
15:00	Paterson 86'	Report	Bryson 30'	Attendance: 18,159; Referee: Carl Boyeson

29 December 2013 23	Barnsley	1–2	Derby County	Oakwell
15:00	Cywka 62'	report	Martin 8', 49'	Attendance: 16,338; Referee: Mark Heywood

1 January 2014 24	Derby County	0–1	Wigan Athletic	iPro Stadium
15:00		report	Beausejour 69'	Attendance: 26,740 (835 away fans); Referee: David Webb

10 January 2014 25	Leicester City	4–1	Derby County	King Power Stadium
19:45 GMT	De Laet 25'; Nugent 48', 60' (pen.); Vardy 64'	Report	De Laet 59' (o.g.)	Attendance: 23,140; Referee: David Coote

18 January 2014 26	Derby County	1–0	Brighton & Hove Albion	iPro Stadium
15:00	Bamford 76'	Report		Attendance: 25,392; Referee: Andy Haines

25 January 2014 27	Blackburn Rovers	1–1	Derby County	Ewood Park
15:00	Gestede 47'	Report	Bamford 84'	Attendance: 13,796; Referee: Tony Harrington

28 January 2014 28	Derby County	3–2	Yeovil Town	iPro Stadium
19:45	Bamford 50'; Bryson 87'; Martin 90'	Report	Lundstram 25'; Miller 34'	Attendance: 23.615; Referee: Jeremy Simpson

1 February 2014 29	Birmingham City	3–3	Derby County	St Andrew's
15:00	Howard 48'; Burke 78'; Macheda 90'	Report	Bamford 49'; Martin 59'; Forsyth 73'	Attendance: 15,224; Referee: Craig Pawson

10 February 2014 30	Derby County	1–0	Queens Park Rangers	iPro Stadium
19:45	Eustace 20'; Forsyth (yellow card) 60'; Grant (yellow card) 88'	Report	Assou-Ekotto (yellow card) 23'; Kranjčar (yellow card) 51'; Barton (yellow card) 65'; Dunne (yellow card) 76'	Attendance: 23,495; Referee: Michael Naylor

18 February 2014 31	Sheffield Wednesday	0–1	Derby County	Hillsborough Stadium
19:45	Llera (yellow card) 35'; Hélan (yellow card) 59'; Hutchinson (yellow card) 74'	Report	Martin (yellow card) 37'; Bryson (yellow card) 40'; Forsyth (yellow card) 53'; Bamford 78'	Attendance: 21,039; Referee: Darren Bond

22 February 2014 32	Derby County	1–0	Bournemouth	iPro Stadium
15:00	Buxton (yellow card) 60'; Forsyth (yellow card) 79'; Martin 85'	Report	Camp (yellow card) 51'; Arter (yellow card) 81'; Elphick (yellow card) 84'; Francis (yellow card) 89'	Attendance: 27,306; Referee: Mark Heywood

1 March 2014 33	Burnley	2–0	Derby County	Turf Moor
15:00	Jones 29'; Marney 68' (yellow card) 80'; Mee (yellow card) 90+1'	Report	Martin (yellow card) 20' (yellow-red card) 43'; Hughes (yellow card) 47'	Attendance: 17,285; Referee: Bobby Madley

8 March 2014 34	Derby County	0–1	Millwall	iPro Stadium
15:00		Report	Morison 61'; Forde (yellow card) 90+2'; Dunne (yellow card) 90+6'	Attendance: 22,853; Referee: Mike Russell

11 March 2014 35	Derby County	0–0	Bolton Wanderers	iPro Stadium
19:45		Report	Medo (yellow card) 83'; Spearing (yellow card) 88'	Attendance: 23,435; Referee: Graham Scott

15 March 2014 36	Reading	0–0	Derby County	Madejski Stadium
15:00	Guthrie (yellow card) 22'; Le Fondre (yellow card) 88'	Report	Dawkins (yellow card) 43'; Eustace (yellow card) 90'	Attendance: 19,514; Referee: Michael Jones

22 March 2014 37	Derby County	5–0	Nottingham Forest	iPro Stadium
13:00	Bryson 6', 32', 69' (pen.); Thorne (yellow card) 18'; Hendrick 37'; Russell 54'	Report	Cox (yellow card) 34'; Fox (yellow card) 73'; Lascelles (yellow card) 85'	Attendance: 33,004; Referee: Michael Naylor

25 March 2014 38	Ipswich Town	2–1	Derby County	Portman Road
19:45	Williams (yellow card) 66' (goal) 68'; Nouble (yellow card) 78'; Berra 90+1'	Report	Bamford 1'; Martin (yellow card) 15'; Bryson (yellow card) 45+3'; Thorne (yellow card) 51'; Forsyth (yellow card) 84'	Attendance: 17,399; Referee: Fred Graham

29 March 2014 39	Derby County	3–0	Charlton Athletic	iPro Stadium
15:00	Bamford 18'; Russell 38'; Martin 84'	Report		Attendance: 24,429; Referee: Mark Haywood

5 April 2014 40	Middlesbrough	1–0	Derby County	Riverside Stadium
15:00	Chalobah 69'	Report		Attendance: 15.234; Referee: Andy Haines

8 April 2014 41	Blackpool	1–3	Derby County	Bloomfield Road
19:45	Goodwillie 1'	Report	Martin 2'; Bamford 14'; Bryson 19'	Attendance: 13,435; Referee: David Webb

12 April 2014 42	Derby County	3–1	Huddersfield Town	iPro Stadium
15:00	Russell 28'; Smithies 50' (o.g.); Martin 57' (pen.)	Report	Wells 14'	Attendance: 25,809; Referee: Darren Deadman

18 April 2014 43	Doncaster Rovers	0–2	Derby County	Keepmoat Stadium
15:00		Report	Thorne 45'; Martin 79'	Attendance: 11,405; Referee: Simon Hooper

21 April 2014 44	Derby County	2–1	Barnsley	iPro Stadium
15:00	Hendrick 34'; Russell 42'	Report	Proschwitz 80'	Attendance: 26,046; Referee: Graham Scott

26 April 2014 45	Derby County	4–2	Watford	iPro Stadium
15:00	Hendrick 28', 81'; Forsyth 60'; Martin 86'	Report	Deeney 5'; Ranégie 70'	Attendance: 25,922; Referee: Scott Duncan

3 May 2014 46	Leeds United	1–1	Derby County	Elland Road
12:15	Smith 50'	Report	Dawkins 6'	Attendance: 29,724; Referee: James Linington

==== Championship play-offs ====
8 May 2014 Semi-final 1st Leg	Brighton & Hove Albion	1–2	Derby County	Brighton
19:45 BST	Lingard 18'	Report	Martin 29' (pen.); Kuszczak 45' (o.g.)	Stadium: Falmer Stadium; Attendance: 27,118; Referee: Roger East

11 May 2014 Semi-final 2nd Leg	Derby County	4–1 (6–2 agg.)	Brighton & Hove Albion	Derby
17:15 BST	Hughes 34'; Martin 56'; Thorne 76'; Hendrick 87'	Report	LuaLua	Stadium: iPro Stadium; Attendance: 32,602; Referee: Craig Pawson

24 May 2014 Final	Derby County	0–1	Queens Park Rangers	London
15:00 BST		Report	O'Neil (red card) 60'; Zamora 90', (yellow card) 90+1'	Stadium: Wembley Stadium; Attendance: 87,348; Referee: Lee Mason

=== FA Cup ===
5 January 2014 Third round	Derby County	0–2	Chelsea	iPro Stadium
14:15 GMT		Report	Mikel 66'; Oscar 71'	Attendance: 32,110; Referee: Andre Marriner

=== Football League Cup ===
6 August 2013 First round	Oldham Athletic	0–1	Derby County	Boundary Park
19:45		Report	Jacobs 20'	Attendance: 5,000 (876 away fans); Referee: Robert Lewis

27 August 2013 Second round	Derby County	5–0	Brentford	Pride Park Stadium
19:45	Martin 19', 77'; Sammon 36', 71'; Hughes 38'	Report		Attendance: 9,076; Referee: Darren Bond

24 September 2013 Third round	Leicester City	2–1	Derby County	King Power Stadium
19:45	Knockaert 78'; Drinkwater 81'	Report	Martin 42'	Attendance: 14,043 (2,209 away fans); Referee: Dean Whitestone

== Squad statistics ==
As of 24 May 2014

No.	Pos	Nat	Player	Total		Championship		FA Cup		League Cup		Play-offs	
No.	Pos	Nat	Player	Apps	Goals	Apps	Goals	Apps	Goals	Apps	Goals	Apps	Goals
1	GK	(England) ENG	Lee Grant	53	0	46	0	1	0	3	0	3	0
2	DF	(England) ENG	Adam Smith (on loan from Tottenham Hotspur)	10	0	7+1	0	0	0	2	0	0	0
3	MF	(Scotland) SCO	Craig Forsyth	53	2	46	2	1	0	3	0	3	0
4	MF	(Scotland) SCO	Craig Bryson	49	16	43+2	16	0	0	2	0	1+1	0
5	DF	(England) ENG	Shaun Barker	0	0	0	0	0	0	0	0	0	0
6	DF	(Republic of Ireland) IRL	Richard Keogh	47	1	41	1	0	0	3	0	3	0
7	MF	(Scotland) SCO	Paul Coutts	11	0	3+5	0	0	0	3	0	0	0
8	MF	(Republic of Ireland) IRL	Jeff Hendrick	35	5	18+12	4	1	0	1	0	3	1
9	FW	(Scotland) SCO	Chris Martin	51	25	44	20	1	0	2+1	3	3	2
10	FW	(Northern Ireland) NIR	Jamie Ward	42	7	31+7	7	1	0	0	0	3	0
11	FW	(Scotland) SCO	Johnny Russell	43	9	23+16	9	0	0	1	0	3	0
12	MF	(England) ENG	Michael Jacobs	6	1	0+3	0	0	0	1+2	1	0	0
12	DF	(England) ENG	Lee Naylor	4	0	0+4	0	0	0	0	0	0	0
13	GK	(Republic of Ireland) IRL	Saul Deeney	0	0	0	0	0	0	0	0	0	0
14	MF	(England) ENG	John Eustace	39	1	28+7	1	1	0	2	0	0+1	0
15	DF	(Republic of Ireland) IRL	Mark O'Brien	0	0	0	0	0	0	0	0	0	0
16	MF	(England) ENG	Ben Davies	7	0	1+3	0	0	0	1+2	0	0	0
17	DF	(Wales) WAL	Kieron Freeman	7	0	5+1	0	0	0	1	0	0	0
18	FW	(Republic of Ireland) IRL	Conor Sammon	42	4	3+34	2	0+1	0	3	2	0+1	0
19	MF	(England) ENG	Will Hughes	48	5	37+4	3	1	0	2+1	1	2+1	1
20	FW	(England) ENG	Mason Bennett	15	1	1+12	1	0+1	0	0+1	0	0	0
21	DF	(Albania) ALB	Valentin Gjokaj	0	0	0	0	0	0	0	0	0	0
22	FW	(England) ENG	Callum Ball	0	0	0	0	0	0	0	0	0	0
23	DF	(England) ENG	Michael Hoganson	0	0	0	0	0	0	0	0	0	0
24	GK	(Norway) NOR	Mats Mørch	0	0	0	0	0	0	0	0	0	0
25	DF	(England) ENG	Jake Buxton	52	2	43+2	2	1	0	3	0	3	0
26	GK	(England) ENG	Adam Legzdins	0	0	0	0	0	0	0	0	0	0
27	DF	(United States) USA	Zak Whitbread (on loan from Leicester City)	4	1	4	1	0	0	0	0	0	0
28	DF	(England) ENG	Jamie Hanson	0	0	0	0	0	0	0	0	0	0
29	MF	(England) ENG	Max Lowe	0	0	0	0	0	0	0	0	0	0
30	MF	(England) ENG	James Bailey	2	0	0+1	0	0+1	0	0	0	0	0
32	FW	(England) ENG	Simon Dawkins	30	4	20+6	4	1	0	0	0	0+3	0
33	DF	(England) ENG	Andre Wisdom (on loan from Liverpool)	38	0	34	0	1	0	0	0	3	0
34	MF	(England) ENG	George Thorne (on loan from West Bromwich Albion)	12	2	9	1	0	0	0	0	3	1
34	MF	(Mali) MLI	Kalifa Cisse	3	0	1+2	0	0	0	0	0	0	0
35	FW	(England) ENG	Patrick Bamford (on loan from Chelsea)	23	8	14+7	8	0	0	0	0	0+2	0
38	DF	(England) ENG	Michael Keane (on loan from Manchester United)	8	0	4+3	0	1	0	0	0	0	0

=== Top scorers ===
As of 24 May 2014

Place	Position	Nation	Number	Name	Championship	FA Cup	League Cup	Play-offs	Total
1	FW	Scotland	9	Chris Martin	20	0	3	2	25
2	MF	Scotland	4	Craig Bryson	16	0	0	0	16
3	FW	Scotland	11	Johnny Russell	9	0	0	0	9
4	FW	England	35	Patrick Bamford	8	0	0	0	8
5	FW	Northern Ireland	10	Jamie Ward	7	0	0	0	7
6	MF	England	19	Will Hughes	3	0	1	1	5
=	DF	Ireland	8	Jeff Hendrick	4	0	0	1	5
8	FW	Ireland	18	Conor Sammon	2	0	2	0	4
=	FW	England	32	Simon Dawkins	4	0	0	0	4
10	DF	England	25	Jake Buxton	2	0	0	0	2
=	MF	England	34	George Thorne	1	0	0	1	2
=	DF	Scotland	3	Craig Forsyth	2	0	0	0	2
13	FW	England	20	Mason Bennett	1	0	0	0	1
=	DF	United States	27	Zak Whitbread	1	0	0	0	1
=	DF	Ireland	6	Richard Keogh	1	0	0	0	1
=	MF	England	14	John Eustace	1	0	0	0	1
=	MF	England	12	Michael Jacobs	0	0	1	0	1
Own Goals					2	0	0	1	3
TOTALS					84	0	7	6	97

=== Disciplinary record ===
As of 24 May 2014

Number	Nation	Position	Name	Championship		FA Cup		League Cup		Play-offs		Total	
Number	Nation	Position	Name	Yellow card	Red card	Yellow card	Red card	Yellow card	Red card	Yellow card	Red card	Yellow card	Red card
14	England	MF	John Eustace	10	0	1	0	0	0	0	0	11	0
19	England	MF	Will Hughes	5	0	1	0	1	0	0	0	7	0
3	Scotland	DF	Craig Forsyth	9	0	0	0	0	0	1	0	10	0
33	England	DF	Andre Wisdom	5	0	0	0	0	0	0	0	5	0
9	England	FW	Chris Martin	8	1	0	0	1	0	0	0	9	1
7	Scotland	MF	Paul Coutts	3	0	0	0	0	0	0	0	3	0
1	England	GK	Lee Grant	3	0	0	0	0	0	0	0	3	0
17	Wales	DF	Kieron Freeman	2	0	0	0	1	0	0	0	3	0
6	Ireland	DF	Richard Keogh	2	1	0	0	0	0	0	0	2	1
2	England	DF	Adam Smith	2	0	0	0	0	0	0	0	2	0
4	Scotland	MF	Craig Bryson	6	0	0	0	0	0	0	0	6	0
16	England	MF	Ben Davies	1	0	0	0	0	0	0	0	1	0
8	Ireland	MF	Jeff Hendrick	1	0	0	0	0	0	1	0	2	0
18	Ireland	FW	Conor Sammon	1	0	0	0	0	0	1	0	2	0
10	Northern Ireland	FW	Jamie Ward	3	0	0	0	0	0	1	0	4	0
34	Mali	MF	Kalifa Cisse	1	0	0	0	0	0	0	0	1	0
25	England	DF	Jake Buxton	3	0	0	0	0	0	0	0	3	0
32	England	FW	Simon Dawkins	2	0	0	0	0	0	0	0	2	0
11	Scotland	FW	Johnny Russell	1	0	0	0	0	0	0	0	1	0
34	England	MF	George Thorne	4	0	0	0	0	0	1	0	5	0
35	England	FW	Patrick Bamford	2	0	0	0	0	0	0	0	2	0
12	England	MF	Michael Jacobs	0	0	0	0	1	0	0	0	1	0
27	United States	DF	Zak Whitbread	1	0	0	0	0	0	0	0	1	0
			TOTALS	75	2	2	0	4	0	5	0	86	2

== Under-21s ==
=== Results ===
Win	Draw	Loss

==== Friendlies ====
13 July 2013	York City	1–0	Derby County	St George's Park
13:00	Chambers (?)	Report

16 July 2013	Derby County	2–1	Leicester City	Moor Farm
11:00	Bennett 5', 44'	Report	Panayiotou 6'

23 July 2013	Derby County	4–0	Brentford	John Port School
	Lelan 16'; Ball 21', 43'; Bennett 41'	Report

3 August 2013	Corby Town	1–2	Derby County	Steel Park
15:00			Tyson (?)	Attendance: 158

8 August 2013	Derby County	1–3	Notts County	Pride Park Stadium
	Tyson 2'	Report	Coombes 17', 64'; Kyle Dixon 57'

12 August 2013	Mickleover Sports	1–2	Derby County	The Raygar Stadium
19:30

11 September 2013	Derby County	1–1	Burnley	Pride Park Stadium

14 October 2013	Heanor Town	2–3	Derby County	Town Ground
	Benger 17'; Stevenson 73'	Report	Ball 24' (?); Dales 59'

30 October 2013	Derby County	5–4	Middlesbrough	Pride Park Stadium
	Ball (?); Sammon (?)	Report	Benger 17'; Stevenson 73'

12 November 2013	Wolverhampton Wanderers	2–2	Derby County	Molineux Stadium

19 November 2013	Derby County	1–1	Burnley	Pride Park Stadium

26 November 2013	Derby County	2–0	Hull City	Pride Park Stadium
	Sammon (?), 28'	Report

==== Professional U21 Development League 2 ====
19 August 2013	Crewe Alexandra	2–1	Derby County	Alexandra Stadium
	Walters 25'; Molyneux 47'	Report	Jacobs 49'

2 September 2013	Leeds United	2–1	Derby County	Elland Road
	Mowatt 24'; Walters 56'	Report	Sharpe 19' (pen.)

18 September 2013	Derby County	4–2	Coventry City	Pride Park Stadium
	Gjokaj 5'; Lowe 52', 75'; Dales 60'	Report	Manset 56'; Garner 59'

25 September 2013	Derby County	3–1	Sheffield Wednesday	Pride Park Stadium
	Thomas 47'; Dawkins 50'; Vernam 68'	Report	Hinchliffe 71'

4 October 2013	Nottingham Forest	1–2	Derby County	City Ground
	Demetriou (?)	Report	Thomas (?); Lowe (?)	Referee: Mark Billingham

4 November 2013	Huddersfield Town	2–1	Derby County	Canalside Sports Complex
	Carr 9', 26'	Report	Bennett 70'

3 December 2013	Sheffield United	2–0	Derby County
	Miller 13'; Calvert-Lewin 48'	Report

==== U21 Premier League Cup ====
23 October 2013 Second qualifying round	Derby County	1–2	Hull City	Pride Park Stadium
	Ball 85'	Report	McLean 13', 35'
