= Nathan Tyson =

English footballer (born 1982)

Personal information
- Full name: Nathan Tyson
- Date of birth: 4 May 1982 (age 44)
- Place of birth: Reading, Berkshire, England
- Position: Forward

Youth career
- Reading

Senior career*
Years	Team	Apps	(Gls)
1999–2004	Reading	33	(1)
2001	→ Maidenhead United (loan)	8	(3)
2001	→ Swansea City (loan)	11	(1)
2002	→ Cheltenham Town (loan)	8	(1)
2004	→ Wycombe Wanderers (loan)	10	(3)
2004–2006	Wycombe Wanderers	68	(39)
2005–2006	→ Nottingham Forest (loan)	8	(2)
2006–2011	Nottingham Forest	176	(33)
2011–2013	Derby County	39	(4)
2013	→ Millwall (loan)	4	(1)
2013–2014	Blackpool	10	(3)
2013–2014	→ Fleetwood Town (loan)	4	(0)
2014	→ Notts County (loan)	10	(0)
2014–2016	Doncaster Rovers	71	(18)
2016–2017	Kilmarnock	17	(0)
2017–2019	Wycombe Wanderers	33	(8)
2019–2020	Notts County	14	(1)
2020	→ Chesterfield (loan)	6	(3)
2020–2022	Chesterfield	21	(2)
2022	→ Alfreton Town (loan)	3	(0)
2022–2023	Grantham Town	29	(6)
2023	Ilkeston Town	4	(2)
2023	Long Eaton United	1	(0)
2023-2024	Basford United	10	(2)
2024	Clay Cross Town	1	(0)

International career
2003	England U20	1	(2)
- * Club domestic league appearances and goals as of 13:25, 18 September 2025 (UTC)

Nathan Tyson (born 4 May 1982) is an English professional footballer who plays as a forward; he last played for Clay Cross Town. He represented the England under-20 team in February 2003.

A pacey, left-footed forward, he began his career at Reading, where he made his first-team debut in April 2000. He had loan spells at Maidenhead United, Swansea City, Cheltenham Town, and Wycombe Wanderers, before he joined Wycombe Wanderers on a permanent transfer in March 2004. He averaged a goal every two games for Wycombe and was sold on to Nottingham Forest for a £675,000 fee in January 2006. He spent five and a half seasons with Forest, and helped the club to win promotion out of League One in 2007–08. He moved on to Derby County in June 2011, and was loaned out to Millwall in January 2013. He signed with Blackpool in September 2013, and was loaned out to Fleetwood Town and Notts County after failing to win a first team place at Blackpool. He joined Doncaster Rovers in July 2014, and spent two seasons with the club before moving to Kilmarnock in 2016 for a year.

== Club career ==
=== Reading ===
Tyson began his career at Reading as part of the youth academy, and made his first team debut on 29 April 2000, coming on as an 80th-minute substitute for Darius Henderson in a 1–1 draw with Bury at Gigg Lane. In August 2001, he joined Swansea City of the Third Division on an initial one-month loan. On 29 September, he was sent off for a foul on goalkeeper Stuart Brock two minutes after coming on as a substitute in a 2–0 win over Kidderminster Harriers at Aggborough, though manager Colin Addison said that he intended to appeal the decision as Tyson was "only a fraction from taking the ball". Tyson scored his first goal in the Football League on 23 October, helping the "Swans" to a 2–0 win over Darlington at Vetch Field. He returned to the Third Division towards the end of the 2001–02 season, joining Cheltenham Town on loan in March 2002. Manager Steve Cotterill signed him to help the club push for the play-offs, and Tyson scored one goal from one start and seven substitute appearances in the league, but did not feature in the play-offs as the "Robins" went on to secure promotion with a 3–1 victory over Rushden & Diamonds in the play-off final.

Reading were promoted into the First Division in 2002, and Tyson managed to earn himself a place in the "Royals" first team in the 2002–03 season, scoring his first goal for the club in a 2–1 victory over Derby County on 28 December. Reading qualified for the play-offs at the end of the campaign, though Tyson was sent off in the play-off semi-final first leg defeat to Wolverhampton Wanderers after fouling Paul Butler and then using abusive language.

"I'm a Reading boy and I don't think I was given a fair chance. Maybe things would have been different if Pards hadn't left, it's hard to say. Steve Coppell is the new manager and he has got his own ideas but I'm obviously not part of that. It's upsetting for me because I really thought I could do a lot for Reading.

— Tyson found himself surplus to requirement at the Madejski Stadium in the 2003–04 season after manager Alan Pardew left the club in October.

=== Wycombe Wanderers ===
In December 2003, Tyson joined Second Division side Wycombe Wanderers on a short-term loan, although had to return to Reading early the next month for treatment on a knee injury. After impressing manager Tony Adams, Tyson was signed for an undisclosed transfer fee in March 2004 and agreed a two-year contract. He finished as the club's top-scorer during the 2004–05 season with 22 goals in 42 league appearances, and also won the club's Player of the Year award. During the close season, Tyson was the subject of three bids from Sheffield Wednesday, all of which were turned down by Wycombe.

He began the 2005–06 season with 13 goals in 19 games, making him the top-scorer in the English leagues at the end of September. He was named as the League Two Player of the Month for August, having scored six times in six games. Sheffield Wednesday had a £700,000 bid accepted in October, but Tyson rejected the move. Tyson stated that he was "flattered" and said "I'm not worth that. How many houses can you buy for £750,000?" He was also linked with moves to Wolverhampton Wanderers and Hull City. His goal glut was quickly followed by a run of six games without a goal, which led manager John Gorman to claim that "his attitude has been fantastic and he'll bounce straight back".

=== Nottingham Forest ===
In November 2005, Tyson joined League One side Nottingham Forest on loan until January, at which point he signed a permanent deal with the club for a fee of £675,000. He ended the 2005–06 campaign with ten goals in 28 appearances. He was injured just minutes into Forest's opening game of the 2006–07 season against Bradford City on 5 August, which kept him out of action for three months. On 9 December, he scored an eight-minute first half hat-trick in a 4–1 win over Crewe Alexandra at Gresty Road. He ended the season with nine goals in 30 games. He scored 12 goals in 39 league and cup competitions in the 2007–08 season, helping Forest to secure runners-up spot in League One and thereby win promotion to the Championship.

In May 2008, he was the subject of a £750,000 bid from Bristol City, which was rejected. In January 2009, Tyson signed a new contract to keep him at the City Ground until the summer of 2011. On 22 January, he scored a volleyed goal to help Forest to beat Premier League side Manchester City 3–0 in the Third Round of the FA Cup. On 29 August 2009, Tyson waved a Nottingham Forest flag in front of the Derby fans after the final whistle of a 3–2 East Midlands derby victory. He was defended by manager Billy Davies but received a fine of £5,000 and a two-game suspended ban for the incident. He scored just four goals in 75 appearances in the 2009–10 and 2010–11 seasons, though was often only entering the game as a substitute. He left the club in May 2011 after rejecting the offer of a new contract.

=== Derby County ===
In June 2011, Tyson signed a three-year contract with Derby County. He made his "Rams" debut in a 2–1 win over former club Nottingham Forest on 17 September. However, he made only two brief appearances in the first half of the 2011–12 season after struggling with groin problems. He scored his first goal for the club in the opening game of the 2012–13 season against Scunthorpe United in the League Cup on 14 August, a match which Derby drew 5–5 and lost 7-6 on penalties. He scored his first league goal four days later, in a 2–2 draw with Sheffield Wednesday. After the match it was reported that fellow Championship side Huddersfield Town were interested in signing Tyson on loan. Tyson fell down the first team pecking order at Derby behind Conor Sammon, Chris Martin, Johnny Russell, and Mason Bennett.

On 16 January 2013, Tyson joined Millwall on loan until the end of the 2012–13 season. Manager Kenny Jackett said that "he has experience of the division [Championship], which at times we've lacked, and he brings pace to our front line". He made his "lions" debut as a half-time substitute in a 2–0 home defeat against Burnley on 19 January; during this game he picked up ligament damage, with an initial prognosis before a scan ruling him out for a month. He failed to score and only managed four appearances as he struggled with injuries during his time at The Den. He was transfer listed by Derby in May 2013. He stated that he was unhappy at finding this fact out through the media and said that manager Nigel Clough did not tell him that he was placed on the transfer list.

=== Blackpool ===
In September 2013, Tyson joined Championship club Blackpool on a free transfer, signing a one-year contract with an option of a second. On 21 November 2013, Nathan joined League Two side Fleetwood Town on loan until 1 January 2014. On 3 March 2014, he joined League One side Notts County on an initial one-month loan, which was later extended until the end of the season. He failed to score in either of his loan spells or for his parent club in a total of 25 appearances in the 2013–14 season.

=== Doncaster Rovers ===
In July 2014, Tyson signed a one-year contract with League One club Doncaster Rovers after impressing on a three-week trial. He triggered a one-year contract extension in April 2015, and said he "rediscovered his love for football" playing under Paul Dickov. He scored a hat-trick on the last day of the 2014–15 season, in a 5–2 win over Scunthorpe United at the Keepmoat Stadium on 3 May. This took him to a final tally of 14 goals in 44 games in all competitions to finish the season as the club's top-scorer, and he was also voted the club's Player of the Year. He then scored seven goals in 36 games in the 2015–16 season as Rovers were relegated into League Two. He lost his first team place to new-signing Gary McSheffrey in March 2016, and manager Darren Ferguson agreed to activate a release in Tyson's contract in June 2016 despite the striker only signing a new one-year contract three months earlier.

He joined Port Vale on trial in July 2016, and manager Bruno Ribeiro told the media that he would sign the player if the club's finances allowed it.

=== Kilmarnock ===
Tyson signed for Kilmarnock on 12 September 2016, having agreed a contract to the end of the 2016–17 season. Kilmarnock announced in their match programme on 5 April 2017, that Tyson had been released from his contract.

=== Wycombe Wanderers (second spell) ===
On 3 July 2017, Wycombe Wanderers announced that Tyson had returned to the club on trial. After playing in some of Wycombe's pre-season friendlies, it was announced on 25 July 2017, that Tyson had signed a one-year deal to return to Wycombe. On 23 April 2018, Tyson signed a one-year extension keeping him at Wycombe Wanderers until the summer of 2019.

=== Non-League ===
He was released by Wycombe at the end of the 2018–19 season. Then went on to sign on for Chesterfield following the 2020-21 season.

On 22 January 2022, Tyson signed for Alfreton Town on a one-month loan from Chesterfield. Tyson was released by Chesterfield at the end of the 2021–22 season.

In July 2022, he dropped down to newly-relegated Northern Premier League Division One East side Grantham Town following his release from Chesterfield.

Tyson joined Ilkeston Town prior to the commencement of the 2023–24 season following an impressive pre-season. On 15 August 2023, he scored his debut goal in a 4-0 win over Gainsborough Trinity. In September 2023, he briefly joined Long Eaton United before signing for Basford United in December of that year.

Tyson left Basford United, subsequently joining Clay Cross Town F.C., of the United Counties League, ahead of the 2024/25 season. He made his debut for Clay Cross Town in the first match of the season, a 1–3 defeat at Stapleford Town on 27 July 2024, but did not play again for the club.

== International career ==
On 6 February 2003, Tyson scored both goals for England under-20's in a 2–1 win over Germany.

== Style of play ==
Speaking in 2002, Cheltenham Town manager Steve Cotterill stated that "he is very quick and his main asset is his pace". Writing for The Guardian in October 2005, David Pleat said that "as a speedy, left-footed goalscorer Tyson is a rarity in the modern game" who made "well-timed runs", particularly for through balls, and had determination to chase lost causes.

== Personal life ==
Tyson was a cousin to Mark Philo, who also played professional football for Wycombe Wanderers. In a 2005 interview, Tyson stated that he had a superstition that led to him dressing on his left side first, liked the music of Usher, and had an interest in cars.

== Career statistics ==
As of end of 2022–23 season

Appearances and goals by club, season and competition
Club	Season	League			National cup		League Cup		Other		Total	
Club	Season	Division	Apps	Goals	Apps	Goals	Apps	Goals	Apps	Goals	Apps	Goals
Reading	1999–2000	Second Division	1	0	0	0	0	0	0	0	1	0
Reading	2000–01	Second Division	0	0	0	0	0	0	0	0	0	0
Reading	2001–02	Second Division	1	0	1	0	1	0	1 (Note: Appearance(s) and goal(s) in the Football League Trophy.)	0	4	0
Reading	2002–03	First Division	23	1	2	0	0	0	1 (Note: Appearance(s) in the play-offs.)	0	26	1
Reading	2003–04	First Division	8	0	0	0	1	0	0	0	9	0
Reading	Total		33	1	3	0	2	0	2	0	38	1
Maidenhead United (loan)	2000–01	Isthmian League Premier Division	8	3	0	0	—		0	0	8	3
Swansea City (loan)	2001–02	Third Division	11	1	0	0	0	0	0	0	11	1
Cheltenham Town (loan)	2001–02	Third Division	8	1	0	0	0	0	0	0	8	1
Wycombe Wanderers	2003–04	Second Division	21	9	0	0	0	0	0	0	21	9
Wycombe Wanderers	2004–05	League Two	42	22	2	0	1	0	2	0	47	22
Wycombe Wanderers	2005–06	League Two	15	11	1	0	2	2	1	0	19	13
Wycombe Wanderers	Total		78	42	3	0	3	2	3	0	87	44
Nottingham Forest	2005–06	League One	28	10	0	0	0	0	0	0	28	10
Nottingham Forest	2006–07	League One	24	7	5	2	0	0	1	0	30	9
Nottingham Forest	2007–08	League One	34	9	3	2	1	1	1	0	39	12
Nottingham Forest	2008–09	Championship	35	5	3	2	1	0	0	0	39	7
Nottingham Forest	2009–10	Championship	33	2	2	0	3	0	2	0	40	2
Nottingham Forest	2010–11	Championship	30	2	2	0	1	0	2	0	35	2
Nottingham Forest	Total		184	35	15	6	6	1	6	0	211	42
Derby County	2011–12	Championship	23	0	1	0	0	0	0	0	24	0
Derby County	2012–13	Championship	16	4	0	0	1	1	0	0	17	5
Derby County	Total		39	4	1	0	1	1	0	0	41	5
Millwall (loan)	2012–13	Championship	4	0	0	0	0	0	0	0	4	0
Blackpool	2013–14	Championship	10	3	0	0	0	0	0	0	10	3
Fleetwood Town (loan)	2013–14	League Two	4	0	0	0	0	0	1	0	5	0
Notts County (loan)	2013–14	League One	10	0	0	0	0	0	0	0	10	0
Doncaster Rovers	2014–15	League One	39	12	2	0	2	1	1	1	44	14
Doncaster Rovers	2015–16	League One	32	6	3	1	1	0	0	0	36	7
Doncaster Rovers	Total		71	18	5	1	3	1	1	1	80	21
Kilmarnock	2016–17	Scottish Premiership	17	0	1	0	0	0	0	0	18	0
Wycombe Wanderers	2017–18	League Two	33	8	1	0	1	0	0	0	35	8
Wycombe Wanderers	2018–19	League One	19	1	0	0	0	0	0	0	19	1
Wycombe Wanderers	Total		52	9	1	0	1	0	0	0	54	9
Notts County	2019–20	National League	13	1	3	0	—		0	0	16	1
Chesterfield (loan)	2019–20	National League	6	3	0	0	—		0	0	6	3
Chesterfield	2020–21	National League	18	2	1	0	—		1 (Note: Appearance(s) in National League play-offs)	0	20	2
Chesterfield	2021–22	National League	3	0	2	1	—		1	0	6	1
Chesterfield	Total		21	2	3	1	0	0	2	0	26	3
Alfreton Town (loan)	2021–22	National League North	3	0	—		—		0	0	3	0
Grantham Town	2022–23	NPL Division One East	29	6	1	0	—		0	0	30	6
Career total			563	121	33	8	16	5	14	1	627	135

== Honours ==
Cheltenham Town

- Football League Third Division play-offs: 2002

Nottingham Forest

- Football League One second-place promotion: 2007–08

Individual

- Football League Two Player of the Month: August 2005
- Doncaster Rovers Player of the Year: 2014–15
