= Michael Hoganson =

English footballer (born 1993)

Personal information
- Full name: Michael George Hoganson
- Date of birth: 3 October 1993 (age 33)
- Place of birth: Newcastle upon Tyne, England
- Positions: Left back; left midfielder

Team information
- Current team: Whickham

Youth career
- 2008–2012: Newcastle United

Senior career*
Years	Team	Apps	(Gls)
2012–2014	Derby County	4	(0)
2014	→ Alfreton Town (loan)	6	(0)
2014–15	Newcastle Benfield		
2015–16	Spennymoor Town		
2016–19	Bishop Auckland		
2019–21	West Auckland		
2021–	Whickham		
- * Club domestic league appearances and goals as of 01:52, 27 April 2014 (UTC)

Michael George Hoganson (born 3 October 1993) is an English footballer who plays as a left-sided defender and midfielder who plays for Whickham in the Northern Football League. He previously played in the Football League for Derby County.

== Playing career ==
Hoganson joined Newcastle United in 2008, during his time at The Magpies Hoganson mainly played for the under 18-side, featuring occasionally in Peter Beardsley's reserve team squads, but never featured in the first team before he was released in the summer of 2012.

After his release by Newcastle, Hoganson went on trial at League Two side Northampton Town and impressed manager Aidy Boothroyd, who offered him a one-year contract. However Hoganson went on trial at Championship side Derby County, which annoyed Boothroyd who jokingly said ahead of a pre-season game against Derby, "I'll run on and kick him myself. I'll run on and two-foot him and his agent," Boothroyd left the offer open for Hoganson despite this. Although Hoganson was left out of Derby's squad in the pre-season game against Northampton, Derby manager Nigel Clough said that he wanted another look at him after he impressed in a friendly against Burton Albion. On 7 August 2012, Hoganson joined Derby County on a one-year contract, with Nigel Clough stating that Hoganson would mainly play for the under-21 side in the new Professional Development League 2 North, but would also provide cover at left back and left-sided midfield in the first team. Hoganson made his competitive first team début in a 3–1 win against Middlesbrough on 1 January 2013, as an 87th minute substitute for Conor Sammon. Hoganson was given his first start in a 0–0 draw at home to Wolverhampton Wanderers on 16 February 2013, covering for the suspended Gareth Roberts at left back. After a run of three consecutive starts, Hoganson lost his place in the team to the returning Roberts and Watford loanee Craig Forsyth, so Hoganson returned to the under-21 side where he remained a regular throughout the season and was rewarded in May by an offer of a new one-year contract.

Hoganson featured for the first team in pre-season ahead of the 2013–14 season with a highlight being a long range goal he scored in a friendly game against Port Vale. Hoganson will act as cover for Craig Forsyth at left back, as well as feature for the under-21 side. On 18 March 2014, Hoganson joined Conference side Alfreton Town on loan until 26 April 2014.

With his contract due to expire, Hoganson was released by Derby at the end of the 2013–14 season. He subsequently returned to the North East of England to play Non-League football, initially with Newcastle Benfield F.C before joining Spennymoor Town in 2015. He then joined Bishop Auckland in February 2016.

== Statistics ==
As of end of 2013–14 season

Club	Season	League		FA Cup		League Cup		Other		Total	
Club	Season	Apps	Goals	Apps	Goals	Apps	Goals	Apps	Goals	Apps	Goals
Derby County	2012–13	4	0	0	0	0	0	0	0	4	0
Derby County	2013–14	0	0	0	0	0	0	0	0	0	0
Derby County	Total	4	0	0	0	0	0	0	0	4	0
Alfreton Town (loan)	2013–14	6	0	0	0	0	0	0	0	6	0
Career totals		10	0	0	0	0	0	0	0	10	0
