= 2012–13 Derby County F.C. season =

Derby County
2012–13 season
- Chairman: Andy Appleby
- Manager: Nigel Clough
- Stadium: Pride Park Stadium
- Championship: 10th
- League Cup: First round
- FA Cup: Fourth round
- Jack Stamps Trophy: Richard Keogh
- Top goalscorer: League: Jamie Ward (12); All: Jamie Ward (12)
- Highest home attendance: 33,010 vs. Nottingham Forest, 19 January 2013
- Lowest home attendance: 4,724 v Scunthorpe United, 14 August 2012
- Average home league attendance: 23,262
Home colours	Away colours	Third colours

The 2012–13 season was Derby County's 107th season in the Football League and their 114th overall in league football. It was their fifth consecutive season in the second tier following the previous campaign and their 45th overall.

Nigel Clough described the season as being "Frustratingly close to being in the top six (but) we were also very pleased with the level of performances, home and away." Steve Nicholson of the Derby Telegraph added that Derby's 10th-placed finish was "thoroughly deserved" and noted that only the small size of the squad, combined with injuries and a lack of signings in the January transfer window, meant that the club did not qualify for the playoffs. He also praised Derby's home form, their best in six years, and noted that "foundations are in place" for a top six finish.

Six of Derby's players featured in the Actim Index's top 100 players for the 2012–13 Football League Championship; Richard Keogh (19), Paul Coutts (37), Jeff Hendrick (58), Conor Sammon (61), Craig Bryson (84) and Jamie Ward (87).

== Team kit ==
On 15 June 2012, Derby County confirmed that Kappa would take over from Adidas as the club's kit supplier, the deal would last until the 2017–18 season. The club's new kit designs were released later in the summer. Derby's away kit design was released on 1 July 2012, an all back design with hints of orange from the kit sponsor buymobiles.net and Kappa, the club also reverted to showing the traditional Ram on the shirt, rather than the full club logo.

The home kit design was released on 16 July 2012, earlier than anticipated due to a website error which leaked to kit designs early. Like the away kit, the traditional Ram instead of the club's logo was on the shirt with kit colours being the traditional white shirts and black shorts. The kit was first worn by the team in the home pre-season friendly against Sunderland, with kit going on general sale from 17 August 2012, a day before the start of the league season.

Home colours	Away colours

== Review ==
=== Pre-season ===
Towards the end previous season, Derby began contract negotiations with players approaching the end of their contracts. Jake Buxton and Gareth Roberts signed new contract to the length of two years and one year respectively. The club also entered into contract talks with Paul Green, whose contract expired at the end of the season and who had attracted interest from Leeds United, among others. The club gave Green until April 2012 to respond. Green rejected Derby's contract offer on 20 April and left the club in the summer. Rams coach Johnny Metgod stated that the club were also in contract talks with Jamie Ward whose contract ended in the summer of 2013. Ward signed a new two-year contract, with an option for a further year which will extend his stay at Derby until at least the summer of 2014. Lee Croft and Miles Addison, both with one year left on their contract, were told that they were free to leave the club in the summer. Defender and captain Shaun Barker, who was injured in a 1–0 win against Nottingham Forest in March 2012 is set to miss the season due to injuries to his medial, anterior cruciate and posterior cruciate ligaments. Barker remains optimistic for a full recovery.

In April 2012 the club finally ended their interest in appointing a director of football, something the club had been considering since May 2011. This meant Derby manager Nigel Clough retained control of the club's player recruitment policy and he was keen to add to his squad, stating a desire to sign a striker and younger left back to cover for Gareth Roberts. Derby said that they expected season ticket sales to be at 15,000 by the end of the early bird deadline on 15 April, down by 2,500 on total season ticket sales compared to 2011–12, CEO Tom Glick was happy with the figures and predicted total season ticket sales to be similar to the previous season. Season ticket prices had increased for the first time in seven seasons. Derby also launched "demand-based ticketing" for single match tickets, with ticket prices fluctuating based on several factors such as local rivalries, team performance, time of the day etc. Derby are the first club to introduced this style of matchday pricing which is popular in North American sports. The club also announced the scoreboard in the stadium would be replaced by a large screen television, which would help improve advertising revenues and show action replays of key moments in the game as well as scores from other games. On 29 May 2012, it was announced that Derby's Chief Executive Tom Glick was leaving the club to take up a Chief Commercial and Operating Officer role at Premier League champions Manchester City. Glick remained in his role at Derby during pre-season.

Following the completion of the 2011–12 season, Derby announced their retained list for the 2012–13 campaign. Goalkeeper James Severn, defender Chris Jones and midfielders Aaron Cole and Ryan Connolly were all told that their contracts would not be renewed and joined Paul Green in leaving the club. Goalkeepers Ross Atkins and Saul Deeney had one-year contract options activated, whilst out of contract pair Conor Doyle and Alex Witham were also retained by the club. Academy players Stefan Galinski, Mats Mørch and Kane Richards all became first year professionals after they completed two-year scholarships. Miles Addison, James Bailey, Lee Croft, Steve Davies and Chris Maguire were all transfer listed by the club on 22 May. Addison attracted the interest of former loan club Bournemouth and several Championship clubs, later joining Bournemouth for an undisclosed fee. Davies, joint top scorer in 2011–12, was transfer listed due to turning down a three-year contract offer due to "family reasons", a decision which Nigel Clough fully respected. Newly promoted Championship club Sheffield Wednesday had two bids for Maguire rejected in May before a third offer in June was accepted and Maguire joined Wednesday for an undisclosed fee. Midfielder Lee Croft joined League One side Oldham Athletic until the end of the season.

Derby were linked to several players in the media, including West Bromwich Albion striker Simon Cox and Northampton Town winger Michael Jacobs. Derby offered Jacobs a contract, which was accepted. As Jacobs was under 24, Northampton were entitled to compensation, either agreed by the two clubs or set by a tribunal. Derby and Northampton agreed an undisclosed fee for the out-of-contract player and Jacobs joined Derby on a three-year contract. The club also were rumoured to be interested in Sheffield United right-back Matthew Lowton although the club denied interest in Lowton, who later joined Aston Villa. Wigan Athletic striker Conor Sammon, who the club had missed out on in January 2011, was also a target for the club. Derby also turned down two bids in excess of £1 million in June for defender Jason Shackell, both believed to be from Burnley and two more bids from further Championship clubs, with one thought to be Cardiff City. However the club later accepted a bid for Shackell from Burnley of £1.1 million and he transferred to Burnley, signing a four-year contract with the Clarets. Attention immediately turned to who Derby would sign as a replacement, with out-of-contract Nottingham Forest defender Joel Lynch the first target. The club spoke to Lynch but denied rumours that he had undergone a medical with them and he opted to sign for Huddersfield Town instead. Coventry City centre-half Richard Keogh, already attracting from Leeds United and bids from Bristol City and Cardiff City, which were rejected, was the next defender the club was linked to, Keogh later joined the club on a three-year contract, with striker Callum Ball loaned out to Coventry for the season. Nigel Clough said that although Derby may be outbid for players, they would be able to offer "the chance to be a part of what we think is a very exciting young side". At the same time, the club announced that eighteen-year-old former Bolton Wanderers winger James Caton had begun training with them. Other defenders Derby were linked to following Shackell's departure were Bristol City defender James Wilson, Leeds United left-back Aidan White, out-of-contract Dundee United centre-half Garry Kenneth, Cardiff City centre-half Anthony Gerrard and Sunderland centre-half John Egan. Derby offered out-of-contract Crewe Alexandra left-back Kelvin Mellor a three-year contract after Crewe only offered the player a one-year deal, but after extensive talks with Derby Mellor turned down Derby's offer after Crewe offered the player a two-year contract which he signed in July. An angry Nigel Clough hit out at Mellor saying "It must be difficult for him going back to the dressing room after all the things he said to us. And then when everyone was starting back for pre-season he decided to go to Ibiza with his mates for five days." Derby made an enquiry for Preston North End outcast Paul Coutts. After the enquiry was accepted, Derby started talks with Coutts and the Scot joined the club on a three-year contract for a reported fee of £150,000. Ross Atkins rejoined Burton Albion on loan, after spending the previous season at the League Two club.

The club's first pre-season friendly was a 2–1 defeat to Mansfield Town. Trialists James Caton and Swiss centre-half Valentin Gjokaj both featured for the club.

=== August ===
Versatile Doncaster Rovers defender James O'Connor joined the club for an undisclosed fee at the start of the month. Under the Premier League's controversial Elite Player Performance Plan, Derby County applied for a tier 2 academy, which meant they were entered into the Professional Development League 2 – North, which replaced the Premier Academy League and Premier Reserve League, as a result Derby withdrew their entry of a reserve team in the Central League, with manager Nigel Clough saying "We've had a great few years in the Reserve League, winning it twice, but our resources cannot stretch to fielding a First Team, Reserve Team, Under 21 Team and an Under 18 team at this moment – especially with games falling so close to each other." The club will stay play reserve games in behind closed doors friendlies. Former Newcastle United left back Michael Hoganson joined the club on a one-year contract, after a trial. American attacking midfielder Danny Barrera the club on trial and featured in the reserve pre-season friendly against Belper Town. Finnish Cesena striker, Roope Riski joined the club on trial ahead of the last first team pre-season against Chesterfield, the game also saw Steve Davies, made his first appearance after talks broke down on a move to Ipswich Town, scoring in a 3–1 loss. A fee of £1.2 million was reported to have been agreed Derby and Wigan Athletic over the transfer of Conor Sammon.

Derby started the competitive season in a League Cup against Scunthorpe United new signings Paul Coutts, Michael Jacobs and Richard Keogh all made their debuts and Keogh opened the scoring on the 30th minute after Jacobs corner, Jake Buxton scored a second goal from a Jacobs corner in the 34th minute, Theo Robinson scored on the 3rd on the 40th minute from another Jacobs corner. In the second half Andy Barcham pulled a goal back for Scunthorpe, Buxton got his second of the night a minute later from a Jacobs free-kick, before Mike Grella scored a second for Scunthorpe in the 63rd minute, Robinson had a 72nd-minute penalty saved by Sam Slocombe and Bobby Grant brought Derby's lead down to 4–3 a minute later, Nathan Tyson got his first Derby goal on the 83rd minute against assisted by Jacobs, Connor Jennings made it 4 in stoppage time and Grant from the penalty spot made it 5–5 to take the game into extra time. No goals were scored in the 30 minute extra time period and the game want to a penalty shoot-out, Scunthorpe won the game 7–6 on penalties with Tom Naylor missing the deciding penalty.

The final friendly of the season saw a Derby XI that included trialists Gjokaj, Barrera, Riski and Livingston striker Marc McNulty beat Matlock Town 2–1. Ahead of the club's first league fixture of the season Swiss defender Valentin Gjokaj signed a two-year deal, with an option of a third. Derby drew the game 2–2 with first half goals from Nathan Tyson (first league goal for Derby) and Jake Buxton and Chris O'Grady for Wednesday, Réda Johnson equalized is stoppage time. After the game it was reported that Bristol City had agreed a transfer fee for wantaway striker Steve Davies and Huddersfield Town were interested in signing Nathan Tyson on loan. Also, Conor Sammon joined the club on a four-year contract and Steve Davies left for Bristol City. Sammon made his debut in the following game at Bolton Wanderers, with James O'Connor making his first start for the club, Derby had a goal disallowed early in the second half before Kevin Davies scored in the 77th minute and Chris Eagles scored as stoppage time as Bolton won 2–0, this result left Derby in the relegation zone after 2 games. Welsh under-21 international Kieron Freeman from local rivals Nottingham Forest for an undisclosed fee. Theo Robinson was reprimanded after he broke club rules by posting on Twitter that he had been dropped from the squad before the team was announced. Derby's last league game for the month ended in a 1–1 draw at Wolverhampton Wanderers, Kevin Doyle scored in the first half for the home team, with Robinson equalising for the Rams in stoppage time. On transfer deadline day, young forward Kane Richards joined Matlock Town on loan.

=== September ===
Derby started the month with a 5–1 win against Watford, with first half goals from Richard Keogh, Jeff Hendrick and Conor Sammon his first for the club. In the second half Will Hughes scored his first goal for the senior team before Jamie Ward made it five Matej Vydra scored a consolation goal for the visitors. Young midfielder Alex Witham was released by the club, after he was allowed to train at an unnamed League One club. Injured defender Shaun Barker signed a one-year contract extension with his new contract running out in the summer of 2015. Polish youth international Stefan Galnski joined Corby Town on a months loan. 18-year-old New Zealand defender Luke Adams joined the club on a one-year contract. After an international break, Derby returned to league action at Huddersfield Town, with Daniel Ward scoring the only goal in the first half for the hosts in the first minute, there were no further goals in the game as Derby lost 1–0. Sam Rush was named as Tom Glick's replacement as the club's CEO on 17 September, Rush departed from his role at the Wasserman Media Group and joined Derby on 1 January. A day later, Derby played Charlton Athletic at home with Jamie Ward opening the scoring form 25-yards, Craig Bryson made it 2–0 after 53 minutes, Ward scored a 64th-minute penalty, Danny Green and Yann Kermorgant scored in the 70th and 72nd minutes respectively for the visitors as the game finished 3–2 to Derby. Four days later, Derby played Burnley at home with Jamie Ward and Charlie Austin scoring in the first half, Austin scored a winning goal for Burnley in the 89th minute. Out of favour midfielder James Bailey joined Coventry City on loan for three months. Stefan Galinski's loan at Corby Town was extended until 9 December, whilst Kane Richards loan at Matlock Town was extended to 3 November. Derby ended the month, playing in the East Midlands derby game at the City Ground against Nottingham Forest, after a scrappy first half, Forest striker Dexter Blackstock was sent off on the 46th minute for an elbow on Richard Keogh and 9 minutes later Craig Bryson scored the winning goal for Derby which earned Derby's first clean sheet and away win for the season, Derby also rose to 12th in the table from 20th.

=== October ===
Top scorer Jamie Ward was out for ruled four weeks after picking up a Grade One hamstring injury in the Forest match. Derby started October's action with a mid-week trip to Middlesbrough; Theo Robinson opened the score for the Rams with a 16th-minute penalty, before Lukas Jutkiewicz equalised 3 minutes later after a Frank Fielding error, Jutkiewicz scored a second on 81 minutes, Paul Coutts scored his first goal for the club equalising in the 87th minute. This game was followed by a home match against Brighton & Hove Albion, which finished goalless as Derby remained in 13th ahead of the international break. 15-year-old Irish youth international defender Jack Tuite joined the club from Cherry Orchard, after trial at Moor Farm. Will Hughes signed a new contract, committing his future to the club until the summer of 2015. Derby returned from the international break to a home match against managerless Blackburn Rovers, Derby drew 1–1 to a 34th minute Jordan Rhodes goal and an 88th-minute equaliser for Theo Robinson. Three days later they were in action at Ipswich Town, and goals from DJ Campbell and Theo Robinson in the first half ensured the scores were equal at 1–1 after the end of the first half, before Nathan Tyson score a late winner for Derby in stoppage time. Derby ended the month at Peterborough United and lost 3–0 with goals from Michael Bostwick and a late double for Saido Berahino after Jake Buxton was sent off for a second bookable offence Adam Legzdins also saved a Lee Tomlin penalty at 0–1.

=== November ===
Derby signed 16-year-old Scunthorpe United striker Charles Vernam for an undisclosed fee. Derby began league action in November against managerless Blackpool, after Ian Holloway left for Crystal Palace on the day of the match, Derby won the game 4–1 with first half goals from Theo Robinson and John Brayford with his first goal in over two years, Tom Ince scored early on in the second half for the visitors through a penalty, before Robinson get his second shortly after and Conor Sammon scored his first goal in two months to close the scoring. Three days later, Derby secured their first back-to-back victories in 24 league matches, after beating Barnsley 2–0 with second half goals from James O'Connor (his first for the club) and Nathan Tyson in the last minute of regulation time. Derby were unchanged for the second consecutive game at Millwall, however they trailed at half time after a 33rd-minute goal from Liam Feeney, before Will Hughes equalized 8 minutes into the second half, however Andrew Keogh got the winner for the hosts on 76 minutes. Hughes was called up for the England U21 squad and became the second youngest player in the side history. After his callup, Hughes was linked with moves to Arsenal, Liverpool and Manchester City, as Nigel Clough was reportedly under-pressure to raise £1.8 million in the January 2013 transfer window with Derby setting an asking price of £4 million for the 17-year-old. Right back John Brayford also was linked with a move to a Premier League outfit, in this case West Ham United. Nigel Clough denied this speculation and said there was no need to sell any players, however he wasn't surprised at the interest that was shown for both players. Out-of favour defender Tom Naylor joined Football League Two side Bradford City on loan from two months. Derby returned to league action on 17 November at table toppers Crystal Palace, Derby lost consecutive league games for the first time for the season with goals two goals from Glenn Murray and a single effort from André Moritz. Further speculation surrounded Hughes as Spanish giants FC Barcelona were also reported to have an interest in Hughes, after scouts from the Catalan club "compiled a detailed dossier" on Hughes when he appeared for England U17 in the Algarve Tournament in February 2012. Young Swiss defender Valentin Gjokaj joined League One outfit Carlisle United on loan for six weeks. Derby won their third consecutive match at home with a 3–2 win at Birmingham City, Derby dominated the first half however only scored once in the half through Conor Sammon, the second half was more equal with Marlon King scoring a penalty for the hosts with 17 minutes to then, Sammon netted again to regain the lead for Derby, before Peter Løvenkrands got a winner two minutes, Nathan Tyson score the winner a further two minutes later. Derby ended the month with a match at home to leaders Cardiff City, with the visitors taking the lead after 11 minutes through Heidar Helguson, a lead which Cardiff held until half-time, however Craig Noone was sent off for the hosts after 63 minutes for a second bookable offence, Theo Robinson equalised with his 8th goal of the season with 21 minutes to go, Derby pushed for a winner but the scores stayed 1–1, with Derby 12th in the table, 5 points behind the play-off places and 12 above the relegation zone.

=== December ===
Derby started the final month of 2012, with a 4–1 defeat at local rivals Leicester City, after goals from Zak Whitbread, Martyn Waghorn and Dave Nugent twice, Theo Robinson scored for the Rams to make it 2–1 before half time. This was Derby's fourth away defeat in four games. A week later, Derby took on Leeds United, with the Rams taking the lead through Sammon on 15 minutes, the visitor equalised on the stroke of half time through former Ram Paul Green, before Jake Buxton scored to make it 2–1 on 66 minutes, late substitute Ben Davies made sure the win was secured in stoppage time as Derby 3–1, the club's eighth win in a row against the Yorkshire club. Derby ended a run of four away defeats in a row with a 2–0 victory at Bristol City after two first half goals from Jeff Hendrick on 34 minutes and Craig Bryson on 36. Valentin Gjokaj's loan Carlisle United was cut short by two weeks after he was recalled by Derby, the Swiss defender only made on appearance in the FA Cup for The Cumbrians. Derby were targeting three wins a row for the first time during the season in a Friday night home match against Hull City, however the Rams fall behind on 25 minutes through a Robert Koren goal before Michael Jacobs scored his first goal for Derby to equalise in first half stoppage time, Abdoulaye Faye scored 5 minutes into the second half to give the visitors the lead for the second time. This result was only the second home defeat during the season for The Rams. Derby went to Burnley on Boxing Day and lost 2–0 with a first half goal from Charlie Austin and second half effort from Michael Duff. Derby ended the calendar year with a 1–1 draw at Charlton Athletic, with hosts taking the lead after Danny Haynes scoring after 19 minutes, Charlton held this lead until the 72nd minute when Jamie Ward scored from the penalty spot on his return after a three-month absence, Ward's goal came from the penalty spot after Michael Morrison was sent off for a foul on Richard Keogh which led to a second booking, Ward only lasted 15 minutes on his first team return as he was replaced after 83 minutes. This result left Derby 11th in the table, 6 points off the play-off places.

=== January ===
The transfer window started with James Bailey re-joining Coventry City on loan for the remainder of the season. Derby played their first league game of 2013 on New Year's Day at home to 3rd placed Middlesbrough; a game which the Rams won 3–1 with first half goals from Michael Jacobs and Jeff Hendrick and Conor Sammon in the second half, Lukas Jutkiewicz got a late consolation goal for the visitors. As a Championship club, Derby started their FA Campaign against League One leaders Tranmere Rovers, with Derby taking the lead through Ben Davies after 42 minutes, Conor Sammon got his 7th goal of the season in the second after 54 minutes, John Brayford got a third for Derby on 63 minutes, Jeff Hendrick made it four on 72 minutes, before 16 year old Mason Bennett got his first goal for the club on 87 which closed to scoring with Derby 5–0 up, this goal also ensured he became the youngest goal scorer in the club's history. Nineteen-year-old Polish youth international defender and striker Kane Richards were both released from the club without making a first team appearance. Derby then went to Brighton & Hove Albion and were 2–0 at half through a 2nd-minute goal from Ashley Barnes and from Andrea Orlandi after 25, Jeff Hendrick pulled one back after 70 minutes to score his third goal in the three Derby's, but Derby couldn't force an equaliser and fell to their 10th defeat of the season, 8 of these away from home. Goalkeeper Ross Atkins was recalled by Derby after he fell down to third choice at his loan club; Burton Albion. Tom Naylor's loan at Bradford City was extended by a month however. and out of favour striker Nathan Tyson joined fellow Championship club Millwall until the end of the season. Derby returned to league action in the East Midlands derby game at home to Forest, with Forest taking lead after 31 minutes through Chris Cohen, Jamie Ward equalised after 52 minutes. Derby ended their January fixtures with a FA Cup fourth round tie at home to Blackburn Rovers, with Rams falling behind after 44 minutes with a Colin Kazim-Richards strike, Scott Dann got a second on 66, Jordan Rhodes made it 0–3 on 71. In the league, Derby finished the month 13th in the table, 9 points behind the play-offs and 10 ahead of relegation. Transfer deadline day was a quiet one for Derby, with only one departure, Lee Croft who was on loan at Oldham Athletic had his contract terminated.

=== February ===
Derby began their February programme with a home fixture to managerless Huddersfield Town, a game which Derby won 3–0 with first half goals from Craig Bryson and Jamie Ward, with Richard Keogh netting the third early in the second half. A week later Derby were on the road against Sheffield Wednesday and with Derby taking a two-goal lead with goals from Hendrick and a Jamie Ward penalty, the hosts pulled a got back level through Leroy Lita and Miguel Llera. Three days later, Derby were back in league action in Yorkshire at Hull City a game which Derby lost 2–1 through a debut goal from Mohamed Nagy, Jamie Ward scored his fourth goal in four games on 84, before Ahmed Elmohamady got the winner three minutes later, Gareth Roberts on his 100th Derby appearance was sent off for serious foul play on 89 minutes, this was also the second red card for a Derby player during the season. Michael Hoganson was given his first senior start after Roberts three game ban and played apart in the defence which kept a clean sheet as the game with Wolverhampton Wanderers finished 0–0, Derby's first goalless result since 6 October. Derby drew at home again three days later, against Bolton Wanderers, Derby fell behind in first half stoppage time through a goal from Richard Keogh, before Jamie Ward got his 10th goal of the season 9 minutes before full-time to secure a 1–1 draw. Theo Robinson who lost his place in the starting 11 to Conor Sammon and Jamie Ward joined fellow Championship side Huddersfield Town on a loan until the end of the season. Norwich City striker Chris Martin joined Derby on an initial months loan, becoming Derby's first loan signing of the season. After his return from Bradford, Tom Naylor was made available for loan and it was reported that he turned down a move to Grimsby Town. Grismby joint manager Paul Hurst stated that Naylor was set to join another Conference National side. However, on 22 February 2013 Naylor completed a loan move to Grimsby Town until the end of the season. Derby ended their fixtures in February with a 2–1 defeat at Watford, through goals from Matej Vydra on 35 minutes and Joel Ekstrand on 68, Jamie Ward scored a penalty for the Rams on 73 minutes.

=== March ===
Derby started March with a Friday night fixture at home to Crystal Palace, Derby lost 1–0 through a 13-minute Yannick Bolasie goal, Conor Sammon had 87 minute penalty saved by Palace keeper Julián Speroni. Top scorer Jamie Ward suffered a re-occurrence of his hamstring injury in this game and as a response, Derby brought in Watford winger Craig Forsyth on a months loan ahead of Derby's trip at table toppers Cardiff City. In the first half, Derby had a handball penalty appeal turned down and had a Chris Martin goal disallowed for offside, Derby took the lead on 75 minutes through Conor Sammon with his first goal in English football away from home before, Craig Noone equalised on 82 to leave Derby winless in seven. Derby then took in Birmingham City looking for a win at St Andrew's for only the second time in twenty-five matches, through a 40th minute Ben Davies goal, before Wes Thomas equalised for the hosts on 67, Nathan Redmond gave the hosts the lead on 75 before Redmond secured to 3–1 win for Birmingham in stoppage time. A week later, Derby took on local rivals at Leicester City at home hoping to end an 8-game run without a win and led 2–0 at half time through Richard Keogh on 16 minutes and Chris Martin with his first for the club on 44. In the second half Leicester opened their account through Jeff Schlupp on 62 minutes, but Derby held on to win 2–1. After this, the club extended Martin's loan until the end of the season. Derby ended the month with an Easter Friday meeting at home with bottom of the table Bristol City, Jamie Ward had a 3rd-minute penalty saved by Tom Heaton, Jeff Hendrick opened the scoring with his tenth goal for the club and his seventh of the season on 36 minutes, Ward made it 2–0 in the second half on 54 minutes, substitute Ben Davies got his third goal of the league season in stoppage to ensure a 3–0 win for Derby. This result ensured back-to-back league wins for the first time since mid-December.

=== April ===
Derby started April, with an Easter Monday evening kick off at Leeds United aiming for a ninth consecutive win against the Yorkshire and season record of three league wins in succession. The first half was fairly event-less and petered out into a 0–0 draw. In the second half, Derby had a Conor Sammon goal ruled offside, before Ross McCormack scored the opening goal for Leeds on 67 minutes, however on 73 minutes Derby won a penalty which Sammon took; however he hit the post but Paul Coutts got his second goal for Derby in the rebound, Derby then pushed for a winner which Jake Buxton got on 88 minutes; to ensure a 2–1 win for Derby. This result moved Derby up to eighth in the table, six points off the play-offs and virtually ensured another season in the Championship at the minimum. Leeds manager Neil Warnock resigned shortly after the match. The following Saturday, Derby welcomed Ipswich Town at Pride Park and in the 44th minute missed their fourth consecutive penalty, their third in three games as Jamie Ward's effort was saved by Scott Loach, Derby were made to pay for the penalty miss when Carlos Edwards scored a winner for the visitors in stoppage time. Defender Jake Buxton signed a new two-year contract before Derby went to relegation threatened Blackburn Rovers, with Rovers leading 2–0 at half time through a Jordan Rhodes penalty and a Scott Dann in stoppage time, there were no further goals in the second half. Three days later Derby returned to league action with an away match at Barnsley another team under threat from relegation, Derby drew the game 1–1 after falling behind through a Chris O'Grady goal on 47th, Derby's equaliser came in stoppage time through Paul Coutts. Will Hughes said a years extension to his contract and returned to the matchday squad for Derby's penultimate home game of the season against Peterborough United, Derby lead three nil after 52 minutes with goals from Craig Bryson, Chris Martin and Richard Keogh however the visitors were allowed back into the match after Frank Fielding was sent off for a professional foul on 62 minutes, Chris McCann converted the penalty but Derby held on to win 3–1. Derby concluded their away fixtures with a tie at fellow midtable side Blackpool winning 1–0 at half-time through Gary Taylor-Fletcher, Tom Ince also missed a penalty for the hosts in the first half, substitute Ben Davies made it 1–1 on 65 minutes before Ludovic Sylvestre got a late winner for the hosts as Derby lost their 12th away game in 23 games. After this game, loan left-back Craig Forsyth was re-called by promotion chasing Watford whilst the club offered a one-year contract to Ben Davies.

=== May ===
It was announced on 2 May that left-back Gareth Roberts would be released, having spent three years with The Rams. As the season drew to a close, the club were linked with a number of players, including Birmingham City winger Chris Burke, Blackpool defender Alex Baptiste, former loanee Craig Forsyth, the on-loan Chris Martin, Norwich City striker James Vaughan and former Derby goalkeeper Lee Grant. Ever-present defender Richard Keogh won the Jack Stamps, Club, and Supporters Player of the Year awards. Will Hughes won the Sammy Crooks Young Player of the Year, with Kieron Freeman winning the under-21 Player of the Year award. Max Lowe winning the Academy Award and Jamie Hanson the scholar award. Jeff Hendrick won the goal of the season for his strike against Middlesbrough, Faye Nixon won the Brian Clough Award and academy head Darren Wassall won the President's Award Derby ended the season with a 1–0 win at home to Millwall, Conor Sammon scored his ninth goal of the season from the bench on 85 minutes as Derby finished the season 10th in the table, seven points above the relegation zone and seven points from the play-offs. On 7 May it was announced that former goalkeeper Lee Grant was to join the club on a free transfer in the summer, signing a three-year deal.

== End of season squad ==
- Ages correct as of final day of the season.

No.	Name	Nationality	Position (s)	Date of birth (age)	Signed from
Goalkeepers
1	Frank Fielding	(England)	GK	4 April 1988 (aged 25)	(England) Blackburn Rovers
13	Adam Legzdins	(England)	GK	28 November 1986 (aged 26)	(England) Burton Albion
30	Saul Deeney	(Republic of Ireland) (Note: Deeney was born in Derry, Northern Ireland, but also qualifies to represent the Republic of Ireland internationally and represented them at U-21 level.)	GK	23 March 1983 (aged 30)	(England) Burton Albion
Defenders
2	John Brayford	(England)	DF	29 December 1987 (aged 25)	(England) Crewe Alexandra
3	Gareth Roberts	(Wales)	DF	6 February 1978 (aged 35)	(England) Doncaster Rovers
5	Jake Buxton	(England)	DF	4 March 1985 (aged 28)	(England) Burton Albion
6	Richard Keogh	(Republic of Ireland) (Note: Keogh was born in Harlow, England, but also qualifies to represent the Republic of Ireland internationally and represented them at U-19 and U-21 level before making his international debut for the Republic of Ireland in February 2013.)	DF	11 August 1986 (aged 26)	(England) Coventry City
15	Mark O'Brien	(Republic of Ireland)	DF	20 November 1992 (aged 20)	Youth system
16	James O'Connor	(England)	DF	20 November 1984 (aged 28)	(England) Doncaster Rovers
17	Tom Naylor	(England)	DF	28 June 1991 (aged 21)	(England) Mansfield Town
21	Valentin Gjokaj	(Albania) (Note: Gjokaj was born in Lucerne, Switzerland, but also qualifies to represent Albania internationally and has represented them at U-21 level.)	DF	23 August 1993 (aged 19)	(Switzerland) Luzern II
22	Michael Hoganson	(England)	DF	3 September 1993 (aged 19)	(England) Newcastle United
23	Kieron Freeman	(Wales) (Note: Freeman was born in Arnold, England, but also qualifies to represent Wales internationally and has represented them at U-17, U-19, and U-21 level.)	DF	21 March 1992 (aged 21)	(England) Nottingham Forest
Midfielders
4	Craig Bryson	(Scotland)	MF	6 November 1986 (aged 26)	(Scotland) Kilmarnock
7	Paul Coutts	(Scotland)	MF	22 July 1988 (aged 24)	(England) Preston North End
8	Jeff Hendrick	(Republic of Ireland)	MF	31 January 1992 (aged 21)	Youth system
12	Michael Jacobs	(England)	MF	4 November 1991 (aged 21)	(England) Northampton Town
18	Ben Davies	(England)	MF	27 May 1981 (aged 31)	(England) Notts County
19	Will Hughes	(England)	MF	7 April 1995 (aged 18)	Youth system
Forwards
9	Nathan Tyson	(England)	FW	4 May 1982 (aged 31)	(England) Nottingham Forest
10	Jamie Ward	(Northern Ireland) (Note: Ward was born in Birmingham, England, but also qualifies to represent Northern Ireland internationally through his grandfather and represented them at U-19 and U-21 level before making his international debut for Northern Ireland in August 2011.)	FW	12 May 1986 (aged 26)	(England) Sheffield United
11	Theo Robinson	(Jamaica) (Note: Robinson was born in Birmingham, England, but also qualified to represent Jamaica internationally and made his international debut for Jamaica in February 2013.)	FW	22 January 1989 (aged 24)	(England) Millwall
14	Conor Doyle	(United States) (Note: Doyle was born in McKinney, Texas, United States, and represented them at U-20 and U-23 level, but also qualifies to represent the Republic of Ireland internationally and represented them at U-21 level before pledging his international allegiance to the United States.)	FW	13 October 1991 (aged 21)	(United States) Creighton Bluejays
20	Mason Bennett	(England)	FW	15 July 1996 (aged 16)	Youth system
25	Chris Martin	(England)	FW	4 November 1988 (aged 24)	(England) Norwich City

== Transfers ==
=== In ===
Permanent

Player	Country	Squad number	Position	Signed From	Date	Fee Paid
Michael Jacobs	ENG	12	Midfielder	Northampton Town	1 July 2012	Undisclosed
Paul Coutts	SCO	7	Midfielder	Preston North End	14 July 2012	£150k
Richard Keogh	IRL	6	Defender	Coventry City	19 July 2012	£1m
James O'Connor	ENG	16	Defender	Doncaster Rovers	1 August 2012	Undisclosed
Michael Hoganson	ENG	22	Defender	Unattached	7 August 2012	Free
Valentin Gjokaj	SUI	21	Defender	Unattached	18 August 2012	Free
Conor Sammon	IRL	32	Forward	Wigan Athletic	20 August 2012	£1.2m
Kieron Freeman	WAL	23	Defender	Nottingham Forest	22 August 2012	Undisclosed

Loan

Player	Country	Squad number	Position	Loaned From	Date	Loan Duration
Chris Martin	ENG	25	Forward	Norwich City	22 February 2013	Season Long
Craig Forsyth	SCO	24	Midfielder	Watford	4 March 2013	Two Months

=== Out ===
Permanent

Player	Country	Squad number	Position	Sold To	Date	Fee Received
Chris Maguire	SCO	11	Forward	Sheffield Wednesday	21 June 2012	£200k
Chris Jones	ENG	27	Defender	End of Contract	30 June 2012	N/A
Paul Green	IRL (Note: Green was born in Pontefract, England, but also qualified to represent the Republic of Ireland internationally through his maternal grandmother and made his international debut for the Republic of Ireland in May 2010.)	32	Midfielder	End of Contract	30 June 2012	N/A
James Severn	ENG	33	Goalkeeper	End of Contract	30 June 2012	N/A
Ryan Connolly	IRL	34	Midfielder	End of Contract	30 June 2012	N/A
Aaron Cole	ENG	—	Midfielder	End of Contract	30 June 2012	N/A
Jason Shackell	ENG	6	Defender	Burnley	5 July 2012	£1.1m
Miles Addison	ENG	—	Defender	Bournemouth	12 July 2012	Undisclosed
Steve Davies	ENG	29	Forward	Bristol City	20 August 2012	£750k
Alex Witham	ENG	—	Midfielder	Contract Terminated	1 September 2012	N/A
Stefan Galinski	POL	—	Defender	Contract Terminated	10 January 2013	N/A
Kane Richards	ENG	—	Forward	Contract Terminated	10 January 2013	N/A
Lee Croft	ENG	—	Midfielder	Contract Terminated	31 January 2013	N/A

Loan

Player	Country	Squad number	Position	Loaned To	Date	Loan Duration
Lee Croft	ENG	—	Midfielder	Oldham Athletic	3 July 2012	Seven Months^{[I]}
Callum Ball	ENG	16	Forward	Coventry City	19 July 2012	Season Long
Ross Atkins	ENG	—	Goalkeeper	Burton Albion	27 July 2012	Six Months^{[II]}
Kane Richards	ENG	—	Forward	Matlock Town	31 August 2012	Two Months
Stefan Galinski	POL	—	Defender	Corby Town	5 September 2012	Three Months
James Bailey	ENG	—	Midfielder	Coventry City	25 September 2012	Three Months
Tom Naylor	ENG	17	Defender	Bradford City	16 November 2012	Three Months
Valentin Gjokaj	SUI	21	Defender	Carlisle United	22 November 2012	One Month^{[III]}
James Bailey	ENG	—	Midfielder	Coventry City	1 January 2012	Season Long
Nathan Tyson	ENG	9	Forward	Millwall	16 January 2012	Season Long
Theo Robinson	JAM	11	Forward	Huddersfield Town	22 February 2012	Season Long
Tom Naylor	ENG	17	Defender	Grimsby Town	22 February 2013	Season Long

Notes
I Croft originally joined Oldham for the season, but Derby terminated the players contract after seven months.
II Atkins originally joined Burton Albion for the season, but Derby recalled the player after six months.
III Gjokaj originally joined Carlisle United for six weeks, but Derby recalled the player two weeks early.

== League table ==
Pos	Team	Pld	W	D	L	GF	GA	GD	Pts
8	Nottingham Forest	46	17	16	13	63	59	+4	67
9	Charlton Athletic	46	17	14	15	65	59	+6	65
10	Derby County	46	16	13	17	65	62	+3	61
11	Burnley	46	16	13	17	62	60	+2	61
12	Birmingham City	46	15	16	15	63	69	−6	61

Updated to match(es) played on 4 May 2013. Source: BBC Sport
Rules for classification: 1) points; 2) goal difference; 3) number of goals scored.

== Results ==
Win	Draw	Loss

=== Friendlies ===
The club announced their pre-season programme on 9 May 2012 with a game at Mansfield Town on 25 July which started a series of 5 pre-season games. There were also trips to Burton Albion, Northampton Town, Colchester United with the set of friendlies completed with a game at Chesterfield on 11 August. On 18 May 2012, a further pre-season friendly was announced, a home game against Premier League outfit Sunderland on 8 August.

Date	Time	Competition	Opponent	Venue	Result	Scorers	Attendance
25 July 2012	19:30	Friendly	Mansfield Town	A	1–2	Robinson 34' (pen.)	2,596 (1,030 away fans)
28 July 2012	15:00	Friendly	Burton Albion	A	1–0	Jacobs 49'	3,026
31 July 2012	19:30	Friendly	Northampton Town	A	4–3	Bennett 35', Robinson 38', 66', Ward 85'	1,726 (493 away fans)
3 August 2012	19:30	Friendly	Colchester United	A	2–2	Okuonghae 8' (o.g.), Robinson 90'	1,352
8 August 2012	19:45	Friendly	Sunderland	H	1–1	Tyson 89'	3,128 (668 away fans)
11 August 2012	15:15	Friendly	Chesterfield	A	1–3	S.Davies 90'	

=== Football League Championship ===
The fixtures for the 2012–13 Football League Championship were announced on 18 June 2012 at 09:00 BST. The season will begin on 18 August 2012, later than usual due to the 2012 Summer Olympics in London. The season will open with an away home game to newly promoted Sheffield Wednesday and ends with a game at home to Millwall on 4 May 2013.

Date	Match No.	Time	Opponent	Venue	Result	Scorers	Attendance	Referee	Pos.
18 August 2012	1	15:00	Sheffield Wednesday	H	2–2	Tyson 11', Buxton 27'	27,437 (5,952 away fans)	S. Mathieson (Cheshire)	10
21 August 2012	2	20:00	Bolton Wanderers	A	0–2		17,050 (974 away fans)	C. Pawson (South Yorkshire)	22
25 August 2012	3	15:00	Wolverhampton Wanderers	A	1–1	Robinson 90'	21,864 (1,480 away fans)	J. Moss (West Yorkshire)	21
1 September 2012	4	15:00	Watford	H	5–1	Keogh 16', Hendrick 36', Sammon 43', Hughes 52', Ward 67'	20,608 (894 away fans)	P. Tierney (Lancashire)	14
15 September 2012	5	15:00	Huddersfield Town	A	0–1		15,265	T. Kettle (Berkshire)	19
18 September 2012	6	19:45	Charlton Athletic	H	3–2	Ward 7', 64' (pen.), Bryson 53'	20,063 (443 away fans)	D. Phillips (West Sussex)	9
22 September 2012	7	15:00	Burnley	H	1–2	Ward 20'	21,387	O. Langford (West Midlands)	16
30 September 2012	8	13:15	Nottingham Forest	A	1–0	Bryson 55'	28,707 (4,389 away fans)	R. Madley (West Yorkshire)	12
3 October 2012	9	19:45	Middlesbrough	A	2–2	Robinson 16' (pen.), Coutts 87'	13,377 (279 away fans)	M. Naylor (South Yorkshire)	13
6 October 2012	10	15:00	Brighton & Hove Albion	H	0–0		22,059 (1,490 away fans)	A. Woolmer (Northamptonshire)	13
20 October 2012	11	15:00	Blackburn Rovers	H	1–1	Robinson 88'	22,958 (1,447 away fans)	M. Haywood (West Yorkshire)	14
23 October 2012	12	19:45	Ipswich Town	A	2–1	Robinson 40', Tyson 90'	15,417 (329 away fans)	A. Madley	12
27 October 2012	13	15:00	Peterborough United	A	0–3		8,427 (2,126 away fans)	S. Hooper (Wiltshire)	13
3 November 2012	14	15:00	Blackpool	H	4–1	Robinson 12', 54', Brayford 31', Sammon 65'	22,272 (905 away fans)	M. Russell (Hertfordshire)	11
6 November 2012	15	19:45	Barnsley	H	2–0	O'Connor 69', Tyson 90'	20,808 (404 away fans)	D. Coote (Nottingham)	9
10 November 2012	16	15:00	Millwall	A	1–2	Hughes 53'	10,392 (661 away fans)	G. Salisbury (Lancashire)	9
17 November 2012	17	15:00	Crystal Palace	A	0–3		16,211 (1,005 away fans)	F. Graham (Essex)	13
24 November 2012	18	17:20	Birmingham City	H	3–2	Sammon 32', 80', Tyson 84'	21,505 (1,571 away fans)	N. Miller (County Durham)	12
27 November 2012	19	19:45	Cardiff City	H	1–1	Robinson 69'	20,911 (777 away fans)	M. Brown (East Yorkshire)	12
1 December 2012	20	17:20	Leicester City	A	1–4	Robinson 38'	20,680 (883 away fans)	G. Eltringham (Sunderland)	16
8 December 2012	21	13:00	Leeds United	H	3–1	Sammon 15', Buxton 66', Davies 90'	25,034 (3,453 away fans)	S. Mathieson (Cheshire)	10
15 December 2012	22	15:00	Bristol City	A	2–0	Hendrick 34', Bryson 36'	12,526 (846 away fans)	A. D'Urso (Essex)	10
21 December 2012	23	19:45	Hull City	H	1–2	Jacobs 45'	25,442 (1,201 away fans)	D. Sheldrake (Surrey)	10
26 December 2012	24	15:00	Burnley	A	0–2		13,779	A. Haines (Tyne and Wear)	12
29 December 2012	25	15:00	Charlton Athletic	A	1–1	Ward 72' (pen.)	17,761 (1,372 away fans)	C. Boyeson (East Yorkshire)	11
1 January 2013	26	15:00	Middlesbrough	H	3–1	Jacobs 19', Hendrick 42', Sammon 65'	22,523 (1,581 away fans)	D. Whitestone (Northampton)	10
12 January 2013	27	15:00	Brighton & Hove Albion	A	1–2	Hendrick 70'	25,464 (1,173 away fans)	I. Williamson (Berkshire)	12
19 January 2013	28	13:00	Nottingham Forest	H	1–1	Ward 52'	33,010 (4,228 away fans)	M. Clattenburg (Tyne and Wear)	13
2 February 2013	29	15:00	Huddersfield Town	H	3–0	Bryson 24', Ward 33', Keogh 59'	21,561 (1,654 away fans)	K. Stroud (Dorset)	9
9 February 2013	30	15:00	Sheffield Wednesday	A	2–2	Hendrick 23', Ward 48' (pen.)	25,765 (3,649 away fans)	O. Langford (West Midlands)	10
12 February 2013	31	19:45	Hull City	A	1–2	Ward 84'	15,677	R. Madley (West Yorkshire)	10
16 February 2013	32	15:00	Wolverhampton Wanderers	H	0–0		23,036 (1,953 away fans)	G. Salisbury (Lancashire)	9
19 February 2013	33	19:45	Bolton Wanderers	H	1–1	Ward 81'	22,145 (774 away fans)	G. Ward (Surrey)	9
23 February 2013	34	15:00	Watford	A	1–2	Ward 73' (pen.)	14.445 (929 away fans)	M. Haywood (West Yorkshire)	11
1 March 2013	35	19:45	Crystal Palace	H	0–1		23,065 (993 away fans)	R. Madley (West Yorkshire)	12
5 March 2013	36	19:45	Cardiff City	A	1–1	Sammon 75'	21,544 (294 away fans)	D. Deadman (Cambridgeshire)	12
9 March 2013	37	15:00	Birmingham City	A	1–3	Davies 40'	15,850 (1,317 away fans)	S. Hooper (Wiltshire)	15
16 March 2013	38	17:20	Leicester City	H	2–1	Keogh 16', Martin 44'	23,123 (1,901 away fans)	K. Stroud (Hampshire)	12
29 March 2013	39	19:45	Bristol City	H	3–0	Hendrick 36', Ward 54', Davies 90'	23,483 (839 away fans)	C. Boyeson (East Yorkshire)	12
1 April 2013	40	17:20	Leeds United	A	2–1	Coutts 73', Buxton 88'	21,384	R. East (Wiltshire)	8
6 April 2013	41	15:00	Ipswich Town	H	0–1		23,081 (939 away fans)	E. Ilderton (Tyne and Wear)	10
13 April 2013	42	15:00	Blackburn Rovers	A	0–2		13,391	A. Haines (Tyne and Wear)	13
16 April 2013	43	19:45	Barnsley	A	1–1	Coutts 90'	9,007 (839 away fans)	P. Tierney (Lancashire)	15
20 April 2013	44	15:00	Peterborough United	H	3–1	Bryson 41', Martin 50', Keogh 52'	23,753 (1,788 away fans)	M. Haywood (West Yorkshire)	11
27 April 2013	45	15:00	Blackpool	A	1–2	Davies 65'	14,775 (1,657 away fans)	G. Ward (Surrey)	13
4 May 2013	46	12:45	Millwall	H	1–0	Sammon 85'	25,021 (1,054 away fans)	R. Madley (West Yorkshire)	10

=== FA Cup ===
As a Football League Championship club, Derby will enter the FA Cup at the third round stage in January 2013. They were given a draw home game to League One table toppers Tranmere Rovers, who they had never played in the competition before and had not met in any competition since a 6–2 home win in the First Division on 8 April 1996. In the fourth round draw, Derby drew fellow Championship side Blackburn Rovers.

Date	Round	Time	Opponent	Venue	Result	Scorers	Attendance	Referee
5 January 2013	3rd round proper	15:00	Tranmere Rovers	H	5–0	Davies 42', Sammon 54', Brayford 63', Hendrick 72', Bennett 87'	11,740	M. Halsey (Lancashire)
26 January 2013	4th round proper	15:00	Blackburn Rovers	H	0–3		14,013 (1,287 away fans)	S. Attwell (Warwickshire)

=== Football League Cup ===
As a Football League Championship club, Derby will enter the Football League Cup at the first round stage, which will commence the week starting 13 August 2012, before Derby's first league game of the season. The seeded and regionalised draw will be made on 14 June 2012 at 09:30 BST with Derby, one of the Northern region's seeded teams, drawn against League One side Scunthorpe United at home, who they had never in the competition before, with the last meeting between the clubs being an away 0–0 draw in the Championship on 19 February 2011.

Date	Round	Time	Opponent	Venue	Result	Scorers	Attendance	Referee
14 August 2012	1st round	19:45	Scunthorpe United	H	5–5 (a.e.t.) (6–7 pens)	Keogh 30', Buxton 34', 53', Robinson 40', Tyson 83'	4,724	D. Mohareb

== Squad statistics ==
=== Appearances, goals and cards ===
No.	Pos.	Name	League		FA Cup		League Cup		Total		Discipline	
No.	Pos.	Name	Apps	Goals	Apps	Goals	Apps	Goals	Apps	Goals	Yellow card	Red card
1	GK	(England) Frank Fielding	16	0	0	0	1	0	17	0	0	1
2	DF	(England) John Brayford	40	1	2	1	1	0	43	2	6	0
3	DF	(Wales) Gareth Roberts	29	0	2	0	1	0	32	0	1	1
4	MF	(Scotland) Craig Bryson	37	5	1	0	1	0	39	5	7	0
5	DF	(England) Jake Buxton	26/5	3	0	0	1	2	27/5	5	4	1
6	DF	(Republic of Ireland) Richard Keogh	46	4	2	0	1	1	49	5	3	0
7	MF	(Scotland) Paul Coutts	44	3	2	0	1	0	47	3	7	0
8	MF	(Republic of Ireland) Jeff Hendrick	43/2	6	2	1	0	0	45/2	7	4	0
9	FW	(England) Nathan Tyson	4/12	4	0	0	1	1	5/12	5	1	0
10	FW	(Northern Ireland) Jamie Ward	23/2	12	1	0	0	0	24/2	12	5	0
11	FW	(Jamaica) Theo Robinson	13/15	8	0	0	1	1	14/15	9	3	0
12	MF	(England) Michael Jacobs	13/26	2	1/1	0	1	0	15/27	2	3	0
13	GK	(England) Adam Legzdins	29/1	0	2	0	0	0	31/1	0	0	0
14	FW	(United States) Conor Doyle	1/1	0	0/1	0	0	0	1/2	0	0	0
15	DF	(Republic of Ireland) Mark O'Brien	6/3	0	2	0	0	0	8/3	0	2	0
16	DF	(England) James O'Connor	15/7	1	0/1	0	0	0	15/8	1	3	0
17	DF	(England) Tom Naylor	0	0	0	0	0/1	0	0/1	0	0	0
18	MF	(England) Ben Davies	8/17	4	1/1	1	0/1	0	9/17	5	3	0
19	MF	(England) Will Hughes	33/2	2	2	0	1	0	36/2	2	3	0
20	FW	(England) Mason Bennett	1/5	0	0/1	1	0/1	0	1/7	1	0	0
21	DF	(Albania) Valentin Gjokaj	2/4	0	0	0	0	0	2/4	0	1	0
22	DF	(England) Michael Hoganson	3/1	0	0	0	0	0	3/1	0	0	0
23	DF	(Wales) Kieron Freeman	10/9	0	0/1	0	0	0	10/10	0	2	0
24	MF	(Scotland) Craig Forsyth	10	0	0	0	0	0	10	0	2	0
25	FW	(England) Chris Martin	12/1	2	0	0	0	0	12/1	2	1	0
28	DF	(England) Josh Lelan	0	0	0	0	0	0	0	0	0	0
29	FW	(England) Steve Davies	0	0	0	0	0	0	0	0	0	0
29	DF	(England) Jamie Hanson	0	0	0	0	0	0	0	0	0	0
30	GK	(Republic of Ireland) Saul Deeney	0	0	0	0	0	0	0	0	0	0
32	FW	(Republic of Ireland) Conor Sammon	41/4	8	2	1	0	0	43/4	9	0	0

== Records ==
=== Club ===
Record	Statistic	Dates(s)
Biggest Win	5–1 v Watford	1 September 2012
Biggest Defeat	0–3 v Peterborough United v Crystal Palace 1–4 v Leicester City	27 October 2012 17 November 2012 1 December 2012
Consecutive Victories	3	16 March 2013 – 1 April 2013
Unbeaten Run	5	30 September 2012 – 23 October 2012
Consecutive Defeats	2	10 November 2012 – 17 November 2012 21 December 2012 – 26 December 2012 23 February 2013 – 1 March 2013
Winless Run	8	9 February 2013 – 9 March 2013

(The above statistics refer to league matches only)

=== Individuals ===
League

Most league appearances:

Pos	Player	Country	Apps (Subs)
1	Richard Keogh	(Republic of Ireland)	46
2	Jeff Hendrick	(Republic of Ireland)	43/2
3	Conor Sammon	(Republic of Ireland)	41/4
4	Paul Coutts	(Scotland)	44
5	Michael Jacobs	(England)	13/26

Most league Goals:

Pos	Player	Country	Goals
1	Jamie Ward	(Northern Ireland)	12
2	Theo Robinson	(Jamaica)	8
=	Conor Sammon	(Republic of Ireland)	8
4	Jeff Hendrick	(Republic of Ireland)	6
5	Craig Bryson	(Scotland)	5

All competitions

Most appearances:

Pos	Player	Country	Apps (Subs)
1	Richard Keogh	(Republic of Ireland)	49
2	Paul Coutts	(Scotland)	47
3	Jeff Hendrick	(Republic of Ireland)	45/2
4	Conor Sammon	(Republic of Ireland)	43/4
5	Michael Jacobs	(England)	15/27

Most goals:

Pos	Player	Country	Goals
1	Jamie Ward	(Northern Ireland)	12
2	Theo Robinson	(Jamaica)	9
=	Conor Sammon	(Republic of Ireland)	9
4	Jeff Hendrick	(Republic of Ireland)	7
5	Craig Bryson	(Scotland)	5

== Season Awards ==
Award	Player
Jack Stamps Player of the Year	Richard Keogh
Club Player of the Year	Richard Keogh
Supporter's Club Player of the Year	Richard Keogh
Sammy Crooks Young Player of the Year	Will Hughes
Under-21 Player of the Year	Kieron Freeman
Academy Player of the Year	Max Lowe
Scholar of the Year	Jamie Hanson
Goal of the Season	Jeff Hendrick v Middlesbrough
Brian Clough Award	Faye Nixon
President's Award	Darren Wassall

== Under-21s ==
=== Results ===
Win Draw Loss Upcoming fixture

==== Friendlies ====
There were three pre-season friendlies announced on 9 May 2012, which began with the final of the 2011–12 Central League Cup against Manchester City Elite Development squad at Pride Park on 4 August, there were also trips to local clubs Belper Town and Matlock Town. The Central League Cup against Manchester City Elite Development squad was postponed in July due to City not being able to name to fulfil the fixture due to a lack of players being available for selection on the date of the match, the game would be rescheduled at a later date. Behind closed doors friendlies would replace the club's reserve league games.

Date	K.O.	Competition	Opponents	Home/ Away	Result F – A	Derby Scorers	Attendance
7 August 2012	19:30	Friendly	Belper Town	A	0–1		850
15 August 2012	20:00	Friendly	Matlock Town	A	2–1	McNulty 26', Riski 43'
TBA	TBA	Central League Cup Final	Manchester City	H

==== PDL2 – North ====
Derby withdrew from the Central League, the instead entered the new U21 Professional Development League 2 – North, which was formed under the controversial EPPP, formulated by the Premier League. Derby started the season away to Leeds United on 22 August and ended the regular season at home to Coventry City on 8 April. Play-offs between the North and South divisions would decide the national champions. With the semi-finals being on 4 May and the final on 11 May.

Date	Match No.	K.O.	Opponents	Home/ Away	Full Time F – A	Derby Scorers	Pos
22 August 2012	1	13:00	Leeds United	A	2–2	Jacobs 11', Robinson	6
27 August 2012	2	13:00	Leicester City	H	3–2	Gjokaj 6', Doyle 72', Davies 84'	2
8 September 2012	3	11:00	Sheffield Wednesday	A	2–1	Robinson 25', Doyle 65'	3
19 September 2012	4	13:00	Huddersfield Town	H	2–0	Jacobs 69' (pen.), Doyle 79'	1
1 October 2012	5	13:00	Crewe Alexandra	H	4–2	Bennett, Doyle, Naylor (x2)	1
15 October 2012	6	13:00	Birmingham City	A	0–0		2
24 October 2012	7	13:00	Sheffield United	A	1–0	Chris Salt 30' (o.g.)	1
29 October 2012	8	13:00	Wigan Athletic	H	4–2	Davies 11', 46', Freeman 27', O'Brien 59'	1
7 November 2012	9	13:00	Leeds United	H	0–5		1
12 November 2012	10	13:00	Nottingham Forest	A	1–2	Jacobs 38' (pen.)	1
17 November 2012	11	13:00	Barnsley	A	2–0	Tyson 3', Robinson 29'	1
17 December 2012	12	13:00	Sheffield Wednesday	H	3–0	Bennett 21', 89', Tyson 49'	1
28 January 2013	13	13:00	Huddersfield Town	A	3–2	Doyle 19', Freeman 76', Hanson 84'	1
11 February 2013	14	13:00	Crewe Alexandra	A	0–3		2
6 March 2013	15	13:00	Sheffield United	H	2–0	Wassall 21', Hoganson 54'	2
18 March 2013	16	13:00	Barnsley	H	2–0	Rooney 58' (o.g.), Hanson 71'	2
26 March 2013	17	13:00	Coventry City	H	1–2	Jacobs (pen.)	2
2 April 2013	18	13:00	Leicester City	A	0–3		2
8 April 2013	19	13:00	Coventry City	A	0–0		2
17 April 2013	20	13:00	Nottingham Forest	H	0–1		2
22 April 2013	21	13:00	Birmingham City	H	0–4		3
24 April 2013	22	14:00	Wigan Athletic	H	0–0		3

=== Player statistics ===
Pos.	Name	Apps	Goals
GK	(England) Atkins	3	0
GK	(Republic of Ireland) Deeney	10	0
GK	(England) Fielding	3	0
GK	(England) Legzdins	5	0
GK	(Norway) Mørch	1	0
DF	(New Zealand) (Note: Adams was born in Melbourne, Australia, but also qualifies to represent New Zealand internationally and represented them at U-17, U-20, and U-23 level before making his international debut for New Zealand in May 2016.) Adams	6/7	0
DF	(England) Berry	1/1	0
DF	(England) Brayford	1	0
DF	(England) Buxton	3	0
DF	(England) Dales	11/3	0
DF	(Wales) Freeman	12	2
DF	(Albania) Gjokaj	18	1
DF	(Poland) Galinski	2	0
DF	(England) Hanson	6/2	2
DF	(England) Hayes	2	0
DF	(England) Hoganson	20	1
DF	(England) Lelan	5/2	0
DF	(England) Naylor	7	2
DF	(England) Nash	1	0
DF	(Republic of Ireland) O'Brien	7	1
DF	(England) O'Connor	7	0
DF	(England) Rawson	1/2	0
DF	(Wales) Roberts	3	0
DF	(England) Sellars	2	0

Pos.	Name	Apps	Goals
DF	(England) Sharpe	0/3	0
DF	(Republic of Ireland) Tuite	0/1	0
DF	(England) Wixted	3/5	0
MF	(England) Bailey	2	0
MF	(England) Bola	0/1	0
MF	(England) Davies	11	3
MF	(England) Clennett	1	0
MF	(England) Dawkins	6/3	0
MF	(United States) Doyle	17	5
MF	(Republic of Ireland) Hendrick	1	0
MF	(England) Hughes	1	0
MF	(England) Jacobs	14	4
MF	(England) Richards	3/1	0
MF	(England) Revan	1/1	0
MF	(England) Smith	5/2	0
MF	(England) Wassall	1/2	0
FW	(England) Bennett	13	2
FW	(England) Carrigy	1	0
FW	(England) Johnson	1	0
FW	(Jamaica) Robinson	4	2
FW	(England) Thomas	6/9	0
FW	(England) Tyson	6	2
FW	(England) Vernam	4	0

== Notes ==
Preceded by 2011–12	Derby County seasons 2012–13	Succeeded by 2013–14
