= Mason Bennett =

English footballer (born 1996)

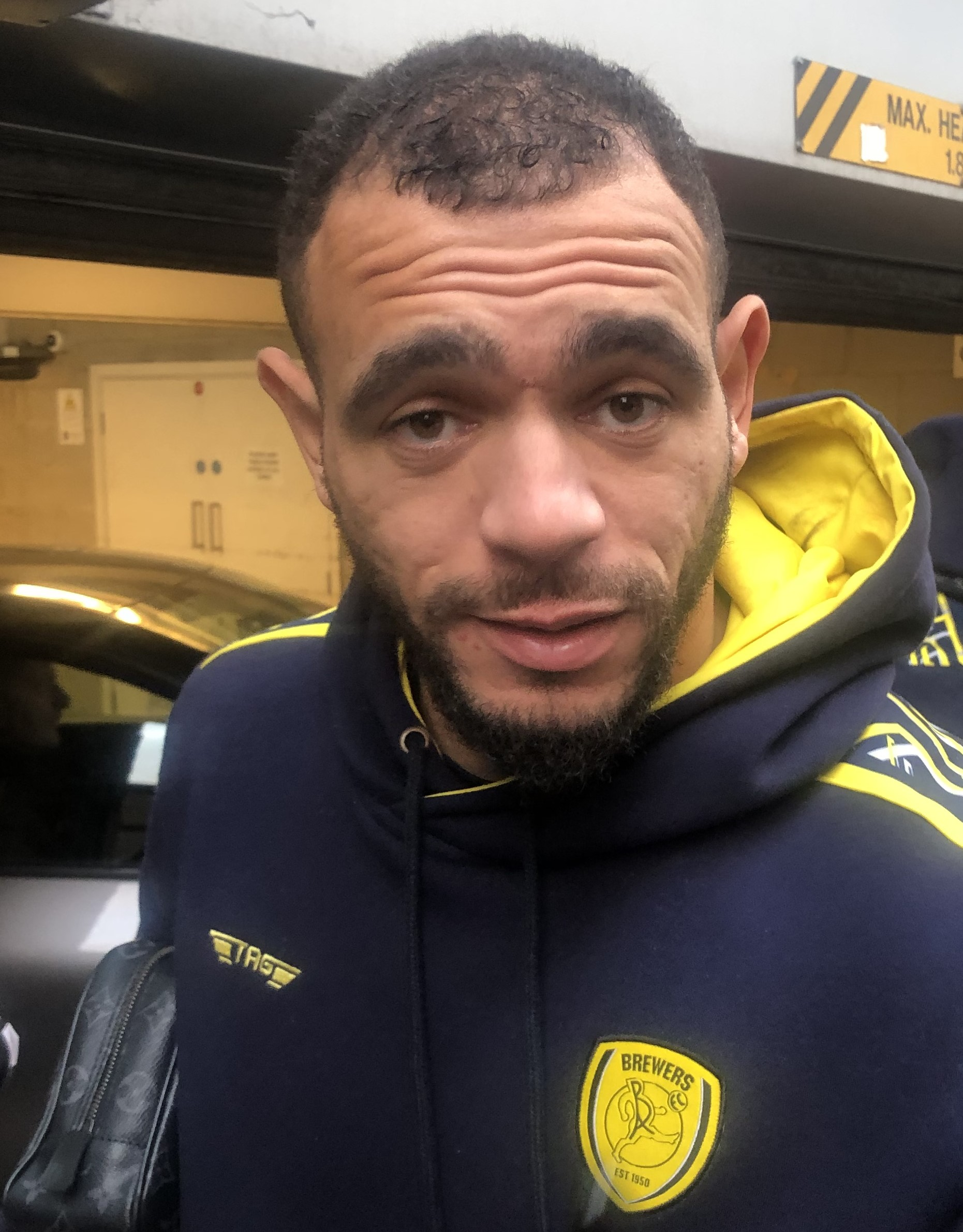
- Mason Bennett in 2024.

Personal information
- Full name: Mason Kane Bennett
- Date of birth: 15 July 1996 (age 30)
- Place of birth: Langwith, England
- Height: 5 ft 11 in (1.80 m)
- Positions: Winger; forward

Team information
- Current team: Worksop Town (on loan from Harrogate Town)

Youth career
- 2010–2011: Derby County

Senior career*
Years	Team	Apps	(Gls)
2011–2020	Derby County	72	(4)
2014	→ Chesterfield (loan)	5	(0)
2014	→ Bradford City (loan)	11	(1)
2016	→ Burton Albion (loan)	16	(1)
2018	→ Notts County (loan)	2	(1)
2020	→ Millwall (loan)	9	(2)
2020–2023	Millwall	87	(9)
2023–2025	Burton Albion	68	(5)
2025–	Harrogate Town	11	(0)
2026–	→ Worksop Town (loan)	1	(1)

International career^{‡}
2011	England U16	2	(3)
2011–2013	England U17	16	(2)
2013	England U19	4	(4)
- * Club domestic league appearances and goals as of 20:13, 17 October 2026 (UTC) ‡ National team caps and goals as of 13:45, 8 September 2014 (UTC)

Mason Kane Bennett (born 15 July 1996) is an English professional footballer who plays as a forward for Worksop Town, on loan from National League club Harrogate Town.

He has also represented England Youth at U-16 and U-17 Level. He holds the record as Derby County's youngest-ever player, when he made his full debut with a start in a defeat at Middlesbrough on 22 October 2011 at the age of 15 years and 99 days old. He beat the previous record, set by Lee Holmes 9 years earlier, by 169 days. Bennett also holds the record of Derby County's youngest goal scorer with a goal against Tranmere Rovers in the FA Cup on 5 January 2013 at the age of 16 years and 174 days old.

== Career ==
Born in Langwith, Derbyshire and attending Shirebrook Academy, Bennett came through the Derby County Academy at Moor Farm and showed "huge potential" at an early age, playing for the club's Under-16's side at just 14 years old and was tied to the club on a five-year contract. When discussing the club's youth policy in September 2011, Derby academy manager Darren Wassall said of Bennett: "He has a great attitude, lots of promise and lots of ability. He is a centre forward who scores goals but he has other parts to his game as well. He works very hard, he lives for football and he is from a lovely family. We have high hopes for him, as we have for many other players." Such was Bennett's ability that he was moved to the U-18 side in the 2011–12 season, and garnered much attention for his performance in a 6–1 win away to Middlesbrough U-18s, where he scored twice and set-up two goals.

He also made sparing appearances at reserve level, making his debut for the reserve team aged 14 against Sheffield Wednesday reserves on 26 October 2010. and making a substitute appearance for the reserve side in a victory at Burton Albion. Bennett's progress was such that he was named in the first team squad for the first time in the League Cup game against Shrewsbury Town on 9 August 2011, under a month after his 15th birthday. However, he remained an unused substitute as Derby lost 3–2.

He was considered for a role in a mid-week match away to Reading but, as Derby boss Nigel Clough later revealed "We would only get back from Reading at about 2am on Wednesday and he (had) school that morning!" His potential and reputation at this point was already at a level where scouts from Manchester United, Manchester City and Liverpool were watching his progress. He eventually made his full debut in a 2–0 defeat at Middlesbrough to become Derby's youngest ever first team player. In the event of the match, Bennett played for 78 minutes and hit the bar in the second half. If the ball had gone in he would have set the record as the youngest scorer in Football League history. Clough described the performance as "a very mature debut." Bennett played nine times during the season and won the Academy Player of the Year award.

Bennett mainly featured for the under-21 side at the start of the 2012–13 season sporadic substitute appearances, it was in one these appearances where Bennett scored his first goal for the first team, in a 5–0 win at home to Tranmere Rovers in the first half of the FA Cup on 5 January 2013, Bennett scored the fifth goal on 87 minutes, 3 minutes after he was introduced into the action. This goal also set the record for the youngest goal scorer in Derby County's history at the age of 16 years and 174 days, beating a record set by Lee Holmes in 2003.

Bennett turned 17 in pre-season ahead of the 2013–14 season, where he is expected to continue to feature for the under-21 side as well as substitute appearances for the first team, with a potential loan move being considered. Bennett however remained at the club and he scored his first league goal in Derby's 5–1 win at Millwall on 14 September. He has since made sporadic appearances under new Rams boss Steve McClaren including an appearance in the FA Cup Third Round on 5 January 2014 tie against Chelsea at iPro Stadium, in which Bennett impressed many fans with his pace and willingness to run at experienced full-back and England centurion Ashley Cole.

On 13 March 2014, Bennett joined League Two side Chesterfield on a month's loan. On 9 April 2014 he was recalled to Derby.

After returning to Derby County on 9 April, Bennett was left out of the squad that faced Queens Park Rangers in the 2014 Football League Championship play-off final but later signed a new four-year deal on 29 July to secure his future at the club.

On 12 August 2014 Bennett joined Bradford City on loan until January. Bennett scored his first goal for the club seven days later, in a 3–1 win away to Crawley Town. He was recalled on 14 October, having scored once in 13 matches.

Bennett joined Burton Albion on loan in January 2016.

On 28 August 2020, Bennett completed a permanent deal to Millwall, signing for an undisclosed fee having spent part of the previous season on loan at the London club.

He subsequently joined Burton Albion. On 13 May 2025 Burton said the player would leave in June when his contract expired.

On 12 June 2025, Bennett agreed to join League Two side Harrogate Town on a two-year deal.

On 17 October 2026, Bennett joined National League North side Worksop Town on a one-month loan deal.

== Personal life ==
Bennett was arrested alongside Derby teammate Tom Lawrence in September 2019 on suspicion of drink-driving. Club captain Richard Keogh was injured in the crash, and ruled out for the rest of the 2019–20 season. Derby manager Phillip Cocu said that Keogh felt responsible for the situation, and after Lawrence and Bennett both returned to Derby's team, Cocu said they were "not off the hook". Lawrence and Bennett were then both fined 6 weeks' wages by Derby, and ordered to serve 80 hours of community service and rehabilitation. On 15 October 2019 Lawrence and Bennett pleaded guilty to drink driving at Derby Magistrates Court.

== International career ==
Bennett represented England at U-16 and U-17 level whilst still only 15, and scored on his debut for the England U-17 side in the Nordic Under-17 Tournament in Iceland in 2011 in a 1–1 draw against Norway U17 in the Group Stages. He grabbed the headlines with his performance in England U-16's 3–1 victory over Northern Ireland U-16's Victory Shield, in which he set up England's opener and then scored two goals in a three-minute second-half spell. He scored another goal in a 4–2 win against Scotland U-16's as England won the Victory Shield.

On 17 January 2012, Bennett was called up to the England U-17 squad for the Algarve Tournament in February 2012, joined by his teammate Will Hughes. Bennett appeared in all 3 games, as England won the 3 game tournament with 7 points. Bennett was also called up the 2012 UEFA European Under-17 Football Championship elite round in March 2012, however England failed to qualify for the main tournament, finishing 3rd in their group on 4 points, with their exit confirmed in a 4–0 loss to Spain U17. In August 2012, Bennett was called up to the England U-17 squad for the St George's Park International Tournament, which was played from August–September 2012. Bennett scored the opening goal in Englands 3–2 loss against Italy U-17's as England finished the tournament in third place out of four teams.

== Career statistics ==
As of end of 2025–26 season

Appearances and goals by club, season and competition
Club	Season	League			FA Cup		League Cup		Other		Total	
Club	Season	Division	Apps	Goals	Apps	Goals	Apps	Goals	Apps	Goals	Apps	Goals
Derby County	2011–12	Championship	9	0	0	0	0	0	0	0	9	0
Derby County	2012–13	Championship	6	0	1	1	1	0	0	0	8	1
Derby County	2013–14	Championship	13	1	1	0	1	0	0	0	15	1
Derby County	2014–15	Championship	2	0	0	0	0	0	0	0	2	0
Derby County	2015–16	Championship	0	0	0	0	0	0	0	0	0	0
Derby County	2016–17	Championship	2	0	0	0	0	0	0	0	2	0
Derby County	2017–18	Championship	3	0	1	0	2	1	0	0	6	1
Derby County	2018–19	Championship	30	3	2	0	3	0	3 (Note: Appearances in EFL Championship play-offs)	0	38	3
Derby County	2019–20	Championship	7	0	0	0	2	0	0	0	9	0
Derby County	Total		72	4	5	1	9	1	3	0	89	6
Chesterfield (loan)	2013–14	League Two	5	0	0	0	0	0	1 (Note: Appearances in EFL Trophy)	0	6	0
Bradford City (loan)	2014–15	League One	11	1	0	0	1	0	1	0	13	1
Burton Albion (loan)	2015–16	League One	16	1	0	0	0	0	0	0	16	1
Derby County U23	2016–17	—	—		—		—		1	0	1	0
Notts County (loan)	2017–18	League Two	2	1	0	0	0	0	0	0	2	1
Millwall	2019–20	Championship	9	2	0	0	0	0	0	0	9	2
Millwall	2020–21	Championship	37	6	1	0	3	0	0	0	41	6
Millwall	2021–22	Championship	29	3	1	0	0	0	0	0	30	3
Millwall	2022–23	Championship	21	0	1	0	1	0	0	0	23	0
Millwall	Total		96	11	3	0	4	0	0	0	103	11
Burton Albion	2023–24	League One	34	3	2	0	0	0	5	1	41	4
Burton Albion	2024–25	League One	34	2	1	1	1	0	1	1	37	4
Burton Albion	Total		68	5	3	1	1	0	6	2	78	8
Harrogate Town	2025–26	League Two	11	0	0	0	0	0	3	1	14	1
Career totals			281	23	11	2	15	1	15	3	322	29

== Honours ==
Chesterfield

- Football League Trophy runner-up: 2013–14

England U16

- Victory Shield: 2011

Individual

- Derby County Academy Player of the Year: 2010, 2012
