= Tom Naylor =

English footballer (born 1991)

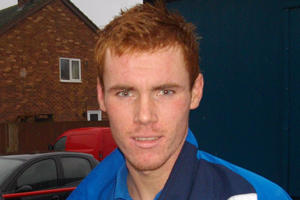
- Naylor in 2011

Personal information
- Full name: Tom Naylor
- Date of birth: 28 June 1991 (age 35)
- Place of birth: Kirkby-in-Ashfield, England
- Height: 1.81 m (5 ft 11 in)
- Positions: Defensive midfielder; centre-back

Team information
- Current team: Chesterfield
- Number: 4

Youth career
- –2009: Mansfield Town

Senior career*
| Years | Team | Apps | (Gls) |
| 2009–2012 | Mansfield Town | 23 | (1) |
| 2009–2010 | → Belper Town (loan) | 32 | (3) |
| 2010 | → Alfreton Town (loan) | 2 | (0) |
| 2011–2012 | → Derby County (loan) | 0 | (0) |
| 2012–2015 | Derby County | 8 | (0) |
| 2012–2013 | → Bradford City (loan) | 5 | (0) |
| 2013 | → Grimsby Town (loan) | 14 | (1) |
| 2013–2014 | → Newport County (loan) | 33 | (1) |
| 2014 | → Cambridge United (loan) | 8 | (0) |
| 2015 | → Burton Albion (loan) | 17 | (0) |
| 2015–2018 | Burton Albion | 107 | (12) |
| 2018–2021 | Portsmouth | 122 | (11) |
| 2021–2023 | Wigan Athletic | 79 | (5) |
| 2023– | Chesterfield | 111 | (18) |
- * Club domestic league appearances and goals as of 22:22, 16 January 2026 (UTC)

Tom Naylor (born 28 June 1991) is an English professional footballer who plays as either a defensive midfielder or a centre-back for EFL League Two club Chesterfield.

He has previously played in the EFL Championship for Wigan Athletic, Burton Albion and Derby County. Naylor has also played for Mansfield Town and Portsmouth and been on loan to Belper Town, Alfreton Town, Bradford City and Grimsby Town.

== Career ==
=== Mansfield Town ===
Born in Kirkby-in-Ashfield, Nottinghamshire, Naylor, originally a midfielder who was converted to central defender, started his career off with English club Mansfield Town by signing his first professional deal in March 2009, and made his first-team debut against Altrincham in the penultimate game of the 2008–09 season. He spent the 2009–10 season on a season-long loan at Belper Town in the process achieving player of the season. In October 2010, Naylor had a short loan spell with Alfreton Town where he played 3 games and helped the club stay unbeaten in all three.

Tom soon built up a reputation as an up-and-coming talent at Mansfield and began to get noticed further up the footballing ladder. With a year left to run on his contract in May 2011 he got interest from Championship clubs such as Leeds United, Hull City and Preston North End.

On 31 August 2011, it was revealed that a bid from an unnamed League One side (later believed to be Charlton Athletic) had been rejected by Mansfield and that a Premiership club had also enquired (which later turned out to be Fulham) with Mansfield manager Paul Cox allowing Naylor to go on a one-week trial.

=== Derby County ===
Naylor eventually joined Derby County on loan, with a view to a permanent deal, on 15 November 2011. The move was made permanent on 2 January 2012, with a contract until the summer of 2015. Nigel Clough publicly praised Naylor for the progress made during the 2 months he spent on loan and this resulted in him being called up to the first team. Naylor's first call up to the first team was in the FA Cup 3rd Round Match against Crystal Palace on 7 January 2012, Derby went on to win the match 1–0 with Theo Robinson scoring after 9 minutes, Naylor was an unused substitute in this match. Naylor was selected on the bench for the following FA Cup 4th Round Match against Stoke City on 28 January 2012, he made his debut as an 89th-minute substitute coming on for Jason Shackell, the match ended in a 2–0 defeat for The Rams. Naylor made his first start and league appearance in a 2–1 win at Doncaster Rovers on 17 March 2012. Naylor started the following 7 matches at right-back, covering for the injured John Brayford as Paul Green returned to his natural midfield role, with Derby winning 3, drawing 2 and losing 3 of these games, keeping 2 clean sheets and conceding 8 goals whilst Naylor was on the pitch. Naylor earned praise from Clough after his first to start and admitted that Naylor had been thrown into the "deep end and doing well", stating a preference for Naylor to be loaned out to a League One or League Two club. In the game against Cardiff City on 17 April 2012, Naylor was substituted at half time after picking up a tight hamstring as Brayford made his first team return.

Despite all of his first team appearances in the 2011–12 season being from right back, Derby manager Nigel Clough said that he intended to play Naylor in the 2012–13 season in central defence and with the season-long injury of Shaun Barker and sale of Shackell to Burnley, Clough stated his faith in Naylor's ability to become a first team regular at Championship level as a central defender. However, after falling down the pecking order at Derby, Naylor joined Football League Two outfit Bradford City on a two-month loan deal on 16 November. He made his debut on 17 November, in a home game against Exeter City. After featuring in 5 matches for The Bantams, Naylor extended his stay at the Yorkshire club by one month on 15 January. Naylor returned to Derby on 11 February, making only two appearances in his third month at Valley Parade. Despite there being a shortage of defenders due to injury and suspension upon his return Derby, Naylor was made available for loan and it was reported that he turned down a move to Grimsby Town. Grismby joint manager Paul Hurst stated that Naylor was set to join another Conference National side. However, on 22 February 2013 Naylor completed a loan move to Grimsby Town until the end of the season. Naylor made his Grimsby debut as a 78th-minute substitute for Jamie Devitt in Grimsby's 3–1 win at Ebbsfleet United on 26 February. On his first start for The Mariners, Naylor scored the only goal in a 1–0 win at Forest Green Rovers on 5 March. Naylor played a total of 16 games for Grimsby, as their promotion chase ended with a 2–0 aggregate defeat to Newport County in the play-off semi-finals. Upon his return to Derby, Naylor was told in May that he was not in Nigel Clough's plans in the future and was made available for transfer with two years left on his contract.

On 12 August 2013, Naylor joined League Two newcomers Newport County on loan until early January 2014. He scored his first goal for Newport in an FA Cup tie against Braintree Town on 9 November 2013. Naylor scored two own goals and conceded a penalty for Newport, in a 2–3 home defeat by Morecambe on 14 September 2013. In the return fixture Naylor scored to put Newport 1–0 up only for him to score another own goal and then get sent off after conceding a penalty. Morecambe went on win 4–1.

Naylor impressed in the first half of the season for Newport. His loan was extended until the end of the 2013–14 season.

=== Burton Albion ===
On 30 January 2015. Naylor joined Burton Albion from Derby County on a loan deal until the end of the season. He ended the season having made 17 appearances and helped win Burton win the League Two title.

On 29 June 2015, following his Derby release, Naylor signed a two-year contract with Burton Albion. He was offered a new contract by the club at the end of the 2017–18 season, following their relegation.

=== Portsmouth ===
On 8 June 2018, Naylor joined Portsmouth on a three-year deal. He turned down interest from other League One clubs and a new contract at Burton to join the Pompey revolution. On joining he said of Pompey:

"It's a massive move and as soon as I heard of Pompey's interest, I wanted to speak to them as soon as possible. I've had some good times at Burton – winning back-to-back promotions and staying up in our first year in the Championship. But this is a huge club and I think that we've got a chance of going up."

On 2 March 2019, Naylor scored his first home Portsmouth league goal, in a 5–1 win over Bradford City A.F.C.

=== Wigan Athletic ===
On 11 June 2021, Naylor agreed to join fellow League One side Wigan Athletic, agreeing a three-year deal at the DW Stadium Naylor made his debut for the club on 7 August in a 2–1 defeat to Sunderland. He scored his first goal for the club on 4 January 2022 in an EFL Trophy tie against Oldham Athletic.

=== Chesterfield ===
On 21 June 2023, Naylor signed for National League club Chesterfield on a three-year contract. The move saw him link back up with former manager at both Portsmouth and Wigan, Paul Cook.

== Career statistics ==
As of 16 January 2026

Appearances and goals by club, season and competition
| Club | Season | League^{[A]} | | | FA Cup | | League Cup | | Other^{[B]} | | Total | |
| Club | Season | Division | Apps | Goals | Apps | Goals | Apps | Goals | Apps | Goals | Apps | Goals |
|---|---|---|---|---|---|---|---|---|---|---|---|---|
| Mansfield Town | 2008–09 | Conference Premier | 1 | 0 | 0 | 0 | 0 | 0 | 0 | 0 | 1 | 0 |
| Mansfield Town | 2009–10 | Conference Premier | 0 | 0 | 0 | 0 | 0 | 0 | 0 | 0 | 0 | 0 |
| Mansfield Town | 2010–11 | Conference Premier | 17 | 1 | 0 | 0 | 0 | 0 | 7 | 0 | 24 | 1 |
| Mansfield Town | 2011–12 | Conference Premier | 5 | 0 | 0 | 0 | 0 | 0 | 0 | 0 | 5 | 0 |
| Mansfield Town | Total | | 23 | 1 | 0 | 0 | 0 | 0 | 7 | 0 | 30 | 1 |
| Belper Town (loan) | 2009–10 | Northern Premier League Division One South | ? | ? | ? | ? | ? | ? | ? | ? | ? | ? |
| Alfreton Town (loan) | 2010–11 | Conference North | 2 | 0 | 0 | 0 | 0 | 0 | 0 | 0 | 2 | 0 |
| Derby County | 2011–12 | Championship | 8 | 0 | 1 | 0 | 0 | 0 | 0 | 0 | 9 | 0 |
| Derby County | 2012–13 | Championship | 0 | 0 | 0 | 0 | 1 | 0 | 0 | 0 | 1 | 0 |
| Derby County | Total | | 10 | 0 | 1 | 0 | 1 | 0 | 0 | 0 | 12 | 0 |
| Bradford City (loan) | 2012–13 | League Two | 5 | 0 | 0 | 0 | 0 | 0 | 2 | 0 | 7 | 0 |
| Grimsby Town (loan) | 2012–13 | Conference Premier | 14 | 1 | 0 | 0 | 0 | 0 | 2^{[C]} | 0 | 16 | 1 |
| Newport County (loan) | 2013–14 | League Two | 33 | 1 | 3 | 1 | 1 | 0 | 3 | 0 | 40 | 2 |
| Cambridge United (loan) | 2014–15 | League Two | 8 | 0 | 1 | 0 | 0 | 0 | 0 | 0 | 9 | 0 |
| Burton Albion (loan) | 2014–15 | League Two | 17 | 0 | 0 | 0 | 0 | 0 | 0 | 0 | 17 | 0 |
| Burton Albion | 2015–16 | League One | 41 | 6 | 0 | 0 | 2 | 0 | 1 | 0 | 44 | 6 |
| Burton Albion | 2016–17 | Championship | 33 | 3 | 1 | 0 | 2 | 0 | 0 | 0 | 36 | 3 |
| Burton Albion | 2017–18 | Championship | 33 | 3 | 1 | 0 | 3 | 1 | 0 | 0 | 37 | 4 |
| Burton Albion | Total | | 184 | 14 | 6 | 1 | 8 | 1 | 8 | 0 | 206 | 16 |
| Portsmouth | 2018–19 | League One | 43 | 4 | 4 | 0 | 1 | 0 | 5 | 0 | 53 | 4 |
| Portsmouth | 2019–20 | League One | 33 | 1 | 3 | 0 | 3 | 0 | 4 | 0 | 43 | 1 |
| Portsmouth | 2020–21 | League One | 46 | 6 | 3 | 2 | 2 | 0 | 2 | 0 | 53 | 8 |
| Portsmouth | Total | | 122 | 11 | 10 | 2 | 6 | 0 | 11 | 0 | 149 | 13 |
| Wigan Athletic | 2021–22 | League One | 43 | 3 | 1 | 0 | 2 | 0 | 1 | 1 | 47 | 4 |
| Wigan Athletic | 2022–23 | Championship | 36 | 2 | 2 | 1 | 0 | 0 | — | | 38 | 3 |
| Wigan Athletic | Total | | 79 | 5 | 3 | 1 | 2 | 0 | 1 | 1 | 85 | 7 |
| Chesterfield | 2023–24 | National League | 44 | 11^{[D]} | 3 | 1 | — | | 0 | 0 | 47 | 12^{[D]} |
| Chesterfield | 2024–25 | League Two | 40 | 4 | 2 | 0 | 1 | 0 | 4 | 0 | 47 | 4 |
| Chesterfield | 2025–26 | League Two | 24 | 3 | 2 | 0 | 1 | 0 | 4 | 0 | 31 | 3 |
| Chesterfield | Total | | 108 | 18 | 7 | 1 | 2 | 0 | 8 | 0 | 125 | 19 |
| Career total | | | 526 | 49 | 27 | 5 | 19 | 1 | 35 | 1 | 607 | 56 |

A. The "League" column constitutes appearances and goals (including those as a substitute) in the Football Conference, the Northern Premier League and the Football League.
B. The "Other" column constitutes appearances and goals (including those as a substitute) in the FA Trophy, Football League Trophy and EFL Playoffs.
C. While Soccerway lists all 16 appearances as League, 2 were actually for Football League Trophy per Soccerbase
D. The attribution of Chesterfield's second goal vs Barnet on 27 February 2024 is disputed. Some attribute this goal to Naylor, whilst others, including Soccerbase, attribute it to Will Grigg.

== Honours ==
Burton Albion

- Football League Two: 2014–15

Portsmouth

- EFL Trophy: 2018–19; runner-up: 2019–20

Wigan Athletic

- EFL League One: 2021–22

Chesterfield

- National League: 2023–24

Individual

- Chesterfield Player of the Season: 2023–24
- National League Team of the Season: 2023–24
