= Andy Smith (footballer, born 1980) =

Northern Irish footballer

Personal information
- Full name: Andrew William Smith
- Date of birth: 25 September 1980 (age 46)
- Place of birth: Lisburn, Northern Ireland
- Height: 5 ft 11 in (1.80 m)
- Position: Forward

Youth career
- Lisburn Youth
- Shankill Boys

Senior career*
Years	Team	Apps	(Gls)
1999	Ballyclare Comrades	9	(3)
1999–2002	Sheffield United	6	(0)
2000	→ Bury (loan)	2	(0)
2001	→ Glenavon (loan)	13	(3)
2002–2004	Glentoran	64	(31)
2004–2007	Preston North End	14	(0)
2004	→ Stockport County (loan)	1	(0)
2005	→ Motherwell (loan)	7	(0)
2006	→ Cheltenham Town (loan)	2	(0)
2007	Bristol City	10	(0)
2008–2009	Portadown	16	(9)
2009–2011	Ballymena United	46	(7)
2011–2012	Union Royale Namur		
2012	Carrick Rangers	1	(0)
2014	Crusaders	8	(0)
2014–2015	Moura	7	(0)
Total		206	(53)

International career
2003	Northern Ireland B	1	(0)
2003–2005	Northern Ireland	18	(0)

Managerial career
- 2022: Dubnica
- 2023–2025: Haka
- * Club domestic league appearances and goals

Andrew William Smith (born 25 September 1980) is a football coach and a former Northern Ireland international footballer. He had a 16-year career playing professional and semi-professional football in Northern Ireland, England, Scotland, Belgium, and Portugal. He also won 18 caps for Northern Ireland between 2003 and 2005 and one cap for the Northern Ireland B team in 2003.

An energetic forward, he began his career at Ballyclare Comrades before signing with Sheffield United in September 1999. He played on loan at Bury and Glenavon, before signing with Glentoran in February 2002. He spent just over two years with the club, and his prolific scoring form helped the "Glens" to win the Irish League (2002–03), County Antrim Shield (2003), Irish League Cup (2003), and Irish Cup (2004). He was sold to Preston North End for £130,000 in July 2004 but failed to score a goal in the English Football League. He struggled with injuries and had brief loan spells at Stockport County, Motherwell, and Cheltenham Town. He joined Bristol City in February 2007. He helped the "Robins" to win promotion out of League One in 2006–07 despite again failing to score a goal. He went back into Northern Ireland semi-professional football with Portadown in October 2007 but did not play in the 2008–09 season due to a contract dispute. He joined Ballymena United in July 2009 and stayed with the club for two seasons. He later had brief stays at Union Royale Namur (Belgium), Carrick Rangers, Crusaders, and Moura (Portugal).

He began his coaching career as Bruno Ribeiro's assistant at Moura and later followed him to Pinhalnovense, Ludogorets Razgrad (Bulgaria), Académico de Viseu, and Port Vale. He managed Slovak club Dubnica for a brief spell in 2022 and managed Finnish club Haka from October 2023 to July 2025.

== Club career ==
=== Early career ===
Smith started out playing for Lisburn Youth in Drumbo, and Shankill Boys as a child. Smith began his career in the Irish League First Division with Ballyclare Comrades, before he was signed by English First Division side Sheffield United in September 1999. He had a two-month loan spell at Second Division club Bury in December 2000. In total, he played ten games for the "Blades" in the 2000–01 campaign and also featured three times for the "Shakers". He struggled with ankle and shoulder injuries at Bramall Lane. He was loaned out to Glenavon in November 2001, and scored three goals in 13 Irish League Premier Division games.

=== Glentoran ===
Smith returned to Northern Ireland on a permanent basis when he signed with Glentoran in February 2002, and scored two goals in ten league games in the remainder of the 2001–02 campaign. He had a prolific 2002–03 season to help Glentoran win a treble (the league title, County Antrim Shield, and Irish League Cup), scoring 35 goals in all competitions, and was described as a "fans favourite" due to his "peroxide blonde" hair and "cheeky goal celebrations". His goal tally included a 12-minute hat-trick in a 6–1 win over Institute on New Year's Eve. He played in the League Cup final, a 2–0 win over Linfield at Windsor Park. He scored a goal as Glentoran lifted the County Antrim Shield with a 3–0 victory over Ballymena United. The "Glens" could have won a quadruple, but lost 1–0 Coleraine in the final of the Irish Cup after a shot from Jody Tolan deflected off Smith into the net. He was sidelined from The Oval for a month with a knee injury, but managed to score seven goals in 23 league games in the 2003–04 campaign. He helped Glentoran to win the Irish Cup in his final appearance for the club, as they beat Coleraine 1–0 to avenge their defeat the previous year.

=== Return to England ===
Smith returned to English professional football after he was signed by manager Craig Brown at Championship club Preston North End for an undisclosed fee (later reported to be £130,000) in July 2004; his international teammate David Healy recommended the club to Smith. He had been due to sign for Milton Keynes Dons when Preston hijacked the deal with a late bid to take him to Deepdale. He featured in 17 games for the "Lilywhites" in the 2004–05 season, without scoring a goal. He was loaned out to League One club Stockport County in November 2004, who were managed by his former Northern Ireland boss Sammy McIlroy; Preston manager Billy Davies said he hoped the move would boost Smith's confidence levels. However, he returned to Preston after playing just twice at Edgeley Park. He joined Scottish Premier League side Motherwell on loan in August 2005 and was described by manager Terry Butcher as "an enthusiastic type of player who always works his socks off". He played nine matches for the "Steelmen" during the 2005–06 without scoring a goal at Fir Park.

He joined Cheltenham Town on loan in November 2006, which saw Cheltenham fans pay his wages as the club were in financial difficulties. Manager John Ward said he was "really grateful to all the supporters who have come forward with the funds to make it happen". However, Smith made just three starts for the "Robins" before returning to Preston after three weeks after he refused to sit on the bench for an FA Cup first round replay at Scunthorpe United. His Preston contract was cancelled by mutual consent in January 2007. Smith joined Gary Johnson's Bristol City on a two-month contract on 23 February 2007. He played 11 games in the remainder of the 2006–07 season, and left Ashton Gate after the "Robins" secured promotion into the Championship.

=== Later career ===
Despite failing to score a single goal in competitive football during his three years in England and Scotland, Smith remained an in demand player in Northern Ireland due to his record in the Irish leagues and his international caps. He signed for Portadown in October 2007 after protracted negotiations due to his "excessive wage demands". He showed "excellent scoring form" before he left the club two months later when his short-term contract ended. He rejoined Portadown in February 2008, signing a contract running until the end of the 2009–10 season. However, he refused to report for training after Portadown were relegated at the end of the 2008–09 season, and Portadown manager Ronnie McFall refused to release him from his contract. Smith had a trial at League Two side Grimsby Town in July 2009.

In July 2009, he signed a two-year contract with Ballymena United. He was handed a six-match suspension after headbutting Newry City's Darren King on 3 December, which manager Roy Walker said was a "draconian punishment" for breaking an "outdated law" as "there was no contact between the players". He scored six goals in 27 league games during the 2009–10 season and hit one goal in 19 league games throughout the 2010–11 campaign. He had his contract cancelled by mutual consent in April 2011, with manager Roy Walker claiming that Smith was planning to head to Vietnam.

In August 2011, Smith signed for Belgian Third Division side Union Royale Namur. He left the club in February 2012. On 30 August 2012, he signed with Michael Hughes's Carrick Rangers but left the club the following day after accepting further trials with clubs in France and Belgium. After joining former club Glentoran on trial in July 2013 to keep his fitness up, he signed for Crusaders on 2 January 2014 until the end of the 2013–14 season. He was an unused substitute in the League Cup final defeat to Cliftonville. He scored one goal for Crusaders, in a 2–1 win over Crumlin Star in the Irish Cup, before being released at the end of the season.

== International career ==
Smith won a cap for the Northern Ireland B team in a game against Scotland Future in May 2003. He played well in the game, and as a result was called up to the full Northern Ireland squad by manager Sammy McIlroy to play against Italy on 3 June 2003. He continued to play in the Northern Ireland team under new manager Lawrie Sanchez. His final international appearance came in a 4–1 friendly defeat to Germany on 5 June 2005.

== Style of play ==
Smith was a forward with stamina and fitness.

== Coaching career ==
Smith began his coaching career as an assistant to former Sheffield United teammate Bruno Ribeiro, and also played seven Campeonato Nacional de Seniores games whilst helping Ribeiro coach Moura AC in the 2014–15 season. He later joined Ribeiro at Pinhalnovense and Vitória Setúbal. He followed Ribeiro to Bulgarian Parva Liga side Ludogorets Razgrad in June 2015. Smith left the club when Ribeiro was sacked six weeks later. Smith later recalled how "mafia types with firework" tried to attack the pair of them in Bulgaria. He followed Ribeiro back to Portugal to assist him at Académico de Viseu in February 2016, before following him to Port Vale five months later. He departed Vale Park after Ribeiro resigned in December 2016.

=== Dubnica ===
Smith signed a two-year contract to manage Slovak 2. Liga club Dubnica in summer 2022. He took charge for eight games – three wins, one draw and four losses – before leaving the club on 6 September.

=== Haka ===
On 31 October 2023, he was appointed the new head coach of Finnish Veikkausliiga club Haka, on a two-year deal with an option to extend. In his first season managing in Veikkausliiga, he led Haka to surprisingly qualify for the top-6 championship group with one of the smaller budgets, and to ultimately finish sixth in the league. He also caused public attention with his outspoken and controversial comments. Smith also publicly criticized the refereeing on multiple occasions, and claimed that some matches were fixed against his team. He was sacked on 28 July 2025. He bemoaned that "we couldn't replace the players who had moved on, given the limited resources", but said he still "I loved every minute" of managing in Finland.

== Personal life ==
Smith has a distinctive appearance, and in October 2016 was described by The Times journalist Gregor Robertson as "wild-eyed, heavily tattooed, flame-haired and bearded".

== Career statistics ==
=== Club ===
Appearances and goals by club, season and competition
Club	Season	League			National cup (Note: Includes Irish Cup, FA Cup)		League cup (Note: Includes Football League Cup, Scottish League Cup, Northern Ireland League Cup)		Other		Total	
Club	Season	Division	Apps	Goals	Apps	Goals	Apps	Goals	Apps	Goals	Apps	Goals
Ballyclare Comrades	1998–99	Irish League First Division	9	3	0	0	0	0	–		9	3
Sheffield United	1999–2000	First Division	0	0	0	0	0	0	–		0	0
Sheffield United	2000–01	First Division	6	0	0	0	4	0	–		10	0
Sheffield United	Total		6	0	0	0	4	0	0	0	10	0
Bury (loan)	2000–01	Second Division	2	0	0	0	0	0	1 (Note: Appearance in Football League Trophy)	0	3	0
Glenavon (loan)	2001–02	Irish League Premier Division	13	3	2	1	0	0	–		15	4
Glentoran	2001–02	Irish League Premier Division	10	2	2	1	0	0	–		12	3
Glentoran	2002–03	Irish League Premier Division	31	22	–		–		–		31	22
Glentoran	2003–04	Irish Premier League	23	7	–		–		–		23	7
Glentoran	Total		64	31	2	1	0	0	0	0	66	32
Preston North End	2004–05	Championship	14	0	0	0	3	0	0	0	17	0
Preston North End	2005–06	Championship	0	0	0	0	0	0	–		0	0
Preston North End	2006–07	Championship	0	0	0	0	0	0	–		0	0
Preston North End	Total		14	0	0	0	3	0	0	0	17	0
Stockport County (loan)	2004–05	League One	1	0	1	0	0	0	0	0	2	0
Motherwell (loan)	2005–06	Scottish Premier League	7	0	0	0	2	0	–		9	0
Cheltenham Town (loan)	2006–07	League One	2	0	1	0	0	0	0	0	3	0
Bristol City	2006–07	League One	10	0	0	0	0	0	1	0	11	0
Portadown	2007–08	Irish Premier League	16	9	–		–		–		16	9
Portadown	2008–09	NIFL Championship 1	0	0	0	0	0	0	–		0	0
Portadown	Total		16	9	0	0	0	0	0	0	16	9
Ballymena United	2009–10	IFA Premiership	27	6	0	0	0	0	–		27	6
Ballymena United	2010–11	IFA Premiership	19	1	0	0	2	0	–		21	1
Ballymena United	Total		46	7	0	0	2	0	0	0	48	7
Carrick Rangers	2012–13	IFA Championship	1	0	0	0	0	0	–		1	0
Crusaders	2013–14	NIFL Premiership	8	0	3	1	0	0	1 (Note: Appearance in Setanta Sports Cup)	0	12	1
Moura AC	2014–15	Campeonato Nacional de Seniores Serie H	7	0	–		–		–		7	0
Career total (Note: Statistics with Union Royale Namur and for numerous clubs in various domestic and European cup competitions in Northern Ireland not recorded.)			206	53	9	3	11	0	3	0	229	56

=== International ===
Northern Ireland
Year	Apps	Goals
2003	5	0
2004	10	0
2005	3	0
Total	18	0

=== Managerial statistics ===
As of 1 July 2025

Managerial record by team and tenure
Team	Nat	From	To	Record							
Team	Nat	From	To	P	W	D	L	GF	GA	GD	W%
Dubnica	(Slovakia)	1 June 2022	6 September 2022	9	4	1	4	16	12	+4	44.44
Haka	(Finland)	31 October 2023	28 July 2025	69	29	14	26	127	112	+15	42.03
Total				78	33	15	30	143	124	+19	42.31

== Honours ==
Glentoran

- Irish League: 2002–03
- County Antrim Shield: 2003
- Irish League Cup: 2003
- Irish Cup: 2004; runner-up: 2003

Bristol City

- League One second-place promotion: 2006–07

Crusaders

- Irish League Cup runner-up: 2014
