= 2006–07 Bristol City F.C. season =

Bristol City
2006–07 season
- Chairman: Steve Lansdown
- Manager: Gary Johnson
- Stadium: Ashton Gate
- League One: 2nd
- FA Cup: Fourth round
- League Cup: First round
- Johnstones Paint Trophy: Southern Area Final

During the 2006–07 English football season, Bristol City F.C. competed in League One. The season proved to be a memorable one for the club, with City gaining promotion to the second tier for the first time since 1999, after eight seasons in the third tier.

== Final league table ==
Pos	Team	Pld	W	D	L	GF	GA	GD	Pts	Promotion, qualification or relegation
1	Scunthorpe United (C, P)	46	26	13	7	73	35	+38	91	Promotion to Football League Championship
2	Bristol City (P)	46	25	10	11	63	39	+24	85	Promotion to Football League Championship
3	Blackpool (O, P)	46	24	11	11	76	49	+27	83	Qualification for League One play-offs
4	Nottingham Forest	46	23	13	10	65	41	+24	82	Qualification for League One play-offs
5	Yeovil Town	46	23	10	13	55	39	+16	79	Qualification for League One play-offs

Rules for classification: In the Football League goals scored (GF) takes precedence over goal difference (GD).
(C) Champions; (O) Play-off winners; (P) Promoted

== Results ==
=== Legend ===
Win	Draw	Loss

=== Football League One ===
5 August 2006 1	Bristol City	1–0	Scunthorpe United	Bristol
	Showunmi 69'			Stadium: Ashton Gate

8 August 2006 2	Bradford City	2–1	Bristol City	Bradford
	Windass 42'; Graham 42'		Murray 2'	Stadium: Valley Parade

12 August 2006 3	Huddersfield Town	2–1	Bristol City	Huddersfield
	Beckett 64'; Abbott 90'		Jevons 49'	Stadium: Galpharm Stadium

19 August 2006 4	Bristol City	2–4	Blackpool	Bristol
	Showunmi 43', 64' (pen.)		Vernon 27'; Jackson 50'; Parker 77'; Graham 90'	Stadium: Ashton Gate

29 August 2006 5	Northampton Town	1–3	Bristol City	Northampton
	Kirk 18'		Jevons 32' (pen.); Orr (red card) 45'; Brooker 71'; Cotterill 90' (pen.)	Stadium: Sixfields

2 September 2006 6	Bristol City	1–0	Brighton & Hove Albion	Bristol
	Brown 21'			Stadium: Ashton Gate

8 September 2006 7	Tranmere Rovers	1–0	Bristol City	Birkenhead
	Mullin 85'			Stadium: Prenton Park

12 September 2006 8	Bristol City	2–1	Leyton Orient	Bristol
	Jevons 19'; Showunmi 44'		Lockwood 66' (pen.)	Stadium: Ashton Gate

16 September 2006 9	Bristol City	3–1	Chesterfield	Bristol
	Carey 4'; Brown 40'; Myrie-Williams 51'		Larkin 21'	Stadium: Ashton Gate

23 September 2006 10	Port Vale	0–2	Bristol City	Stoke on Trent
			Brown 45'; Jevons 76'	Stadium: Vale Park

26 September 2006 11	Bournemouth	0–1	Bristol City	Bournemouth
			Jevons 70'	Stadium: Fitness First Stadium

30 September 2006 12	Bristol City	0–0	Oldham Athletic	Bristol
				Stadium: Ashton Gate

7 October 2006 13	Brentford	1–1	Bristol City	Brentford
	O'Connor 68' (pen.)		McCombe 41'	Stadium: Griffin Park

14 October 2006 14	Bristol City	2–1	Crewe Alexandra	Bristol
	Murray 26'; Brown 32'		Varney 60'; Roberts (red card) 69'	Stadium: Ashton Gate

21 October 2006 15	Nottingham Forest	1–0	Bristol City	Nottingham
	Southall 9'			Stadium: City Ground

28 October 2006 16	Bristol City	1–0	Doncaster Rovers	Bristol
	Carey 37'			Stadium: Ashton Gate

4 November 2006 17	Yeovil Town	2–1	Bristol City	Yeovil
	Guyett (red card) 45'; Davies 78'; Gray 90'		Carey (red card) 45'; Jevons 90' (pen.)	Stadium: Huish Park

18 November 2006 18	Bristol City	3–1	Gillingham	Bristol
	Keogh 29'; Showunmi 77'; Murray 90'		Flynn 15'	Stadium: Ashton Gate

26 November 2006 19	Swansea City	0–0	Bristol City	Swansea
				Stadium: Liberty Stadium

5 December 2006 20	Bristol City	1–0	Carlisle United	Bristol
	Showunmi 85'			Stadium: Ashton Gate

9 December 2006 21	Rotherham United	1–1	Bristol City	Rotherham
	Facey 53'		Murray 72'	Stadium: Millmoor

16 December 2006 22	Bristol City	1–0	Millwall	Bristol
	Murray 1'			Stadium: Ashton Gate

23 December 2006 23	Cheltenham Town	2–2	Bristol City	Cheltenham
	O'Leary 36'; Bird 38'		Orr 53'; McCombe 90'	Stadium: Whaddon Road

26 December 2006 24	Bristol City	2–2	Bournemouth	Bristol
	Murray 74'; Johnson 80'		Pitman 16'; Browning 47'	Stadium: Ashton Gate

30 December 2006 25	Bristol City	2–1	Port Vale	Bristol
	Brooker 69'; Murray 76'		Smith 68'	Stadium: Ashton Gate

1 January 2007 26	Leyton Orient	1–1	Bristol City	London
	Lockwood 62' (pen.)		Johnson 68'	Stadium: Brisbane Road

13 January 2007 27	Bristol City	3–2	Tranmere Rovers	Bristol
	Showunmi 48'; Jevons 59'; Myrie-Williams 68'		McCombe 25' (o.g.); McLaren 44'	Stadium: Ashton Gate

20 January 2007 28	Oldham Athletic	0–3	Bristol City	Oldham
			Showunmi 9'; McAllister 37'; Andrews 65'	Stadium: Boundary Park

31 January 2007 29	Bristol City	0–1	Cheltenham Town	Bristol
			Spencer 44'	Stadium: Ashton Gate

5 February 2007 30	Scunthorpe United	1–0	Bristol City	Scunthorpe
	Sharp 41'			Stadium: Glanford Park

10 February 2007 31	Bristol City	1–1	Huddersfield Town	Bristol
	Basso (red card) 65'; Johnson 88'		Taylor-Fletcher 52'	Stadium: Ashton Gate

17 February 2007 32	Blackpool	0–1	Bristol City	Blackpool
			Andrews 53'	Stadium: Bloomfield Road

24 February 2007 33	Brighton & Hove Albion	0–2	Bristol City	Brighton
	Fraser (red card) 82'		Jevons 43', 84' (pen.)	Stadium: Withdean Stadium

3 March 2007 34	Bristol City	1–0	Northampton Town	Bristol
	Betsy 19'			Stadium: Ashton Gate

7 March 2007 35	Chesterfield	1–3	Bristol City	Chesterfield
	Allison 59'		Keogh 8'; Johnson 36'; Noble 45'	Stadium: Saltergate

10 March 2007 36	Bristol City	1–0	Brentford	Bristol
	Jevons 5' (pen.)			Stadium: Ashton Gate

13 March 2007 37	Bristol City	2–3	Bradford City	Bristol
	Jevons 13'; Russell 90'		Paynter 44'; Ashikodi 49'; Schumacher 55'	Stadium: Ashton Gate

17 March 2007 38	Crewe Alexandra	0–1	Bristol City	Crewe
			Showunmi 85'	Stadium: Gresty Road

24 March 2007 39	Doncaster Rovers	0–1	Bristol City	Doncaster
			McCombe 88'	Stadium: Keepmoat Stadium

31 March 2007 40	Bristol City	1–1	Nottingham Forest	Bristol
	Orr 38'		Holt 5'	Stadium: Ashton Gate

7 April 2007 41	Bristol City	0–0	Swansea City	Bristol
				Stadium: Ashton Gate

9 April 2007 42	Gillingham	1–0	Bristol City	Gillingham
	McDonald 55'			Stadium: Priestfield

14 April 2007 43	Bristol City	2–0	Yeovil Town	Bristol
	Johnson 43'; Orr 71' (pen.)		Guyett (red card) 70'	Stadium: Ashton Gate

21 April 2007 44	Carlisle United	1–3	Bristol City	Carlisle
	Graham 5'		McCombe 45'; Showunmi 65'; Orr 84'	Stadium: Brunton Park

28 April 2007 45	Millwall	1–0	Bristol City	London
	Robinson 78'			Stadium: The Den

5 May 2007 46	Bristol City	3–1	Rotherham United	Bristol
	Noble 8', 44'; Russell 55'		Newsham 58'	Stadium: Ashton Gate

=== FA Cup ===
11 November 2006 1	York City	0–1	Bristol City	York
			McCombe 53'	Stadium: Bootham Crescent

3 December 2006 2	Bristol City	4–3	Gillingham	Bristol
	Jevons 21', 44', 45'; Showunmi 64'		Mulligan 49'; Flynn 66', 90' (pen.)	Stadium: Ashton Gate

6 January 2007 3	Bristol City	3–3	Coventry City	Bristol
	Brooker 14'; Showunmi 18'; Jevons 21'		Cameron 13'; McKenzie 33'; John 81'	Stadium: Ashton Gate

16 January 2007 3 Replay	Coventry City	0–2	Bristol City	Coventry
			Murray 39'; Showunmi 54'	Stadium: Ricoh Arena

27 January 2007 4	Bristol City	2–2	Middlesbrough	Bristol
	Keogh 53'; Murray 59'		Yakubu 4'; Christie 23'	Stadium: Ashton Gate

13 February 2007 4 Replay	Middlesbrough	2–2 (a.e.t.) (5–4 p)	Bristol City	Bristol
	Viduka 69'; Yakubu 102'		Noble 23'; McCombe 117'	Stadium: Ashton Gate

=== League Cup ===
22 August 2006 1	Cheltenham Town	2–1	Bristol City	Cheltenham
	Guinan 24'; Wilson 33'		Cotterill 39'	Stadium: Whaddon Park

=== Football League Trophy ===
1 November 2006 2	Leyton Orient	1–3	Bristol City	London
	Duncan 63'		Corr 71'; Jevons 80'; Keogh 90'	Stadium: Brisbane Road

29 November 2006 Southern Quarter Final	Nottingham Forest	2–2 (a.e.t.) (2–4 p)	Bristol City	Nottingham
	Morgan 45'; Holt 79'		Jevons 58'; Showunmi 63'	Stadium: City Ground

23 January 2007 Southern Semi Final	Bristol City	2–0	Brighton & Hove Albion	Bristol
	Showunmi 41'; Andrews 68'			Stadium: Ashton Gate

21 February 2007 Southern Final First Leg	Bristol City	0–0	Bristol Rovers	Bristol
				Stadium: Ashton Gate

27 February 2007 Southern Final Second Leg	Bristol Rovers	1–0	Bristol City	Bristol
	Lambert 65'			Stadium: Memorial Stadium

== Squad statistics ==
Note: Flags indicate national team as defined under FIFA eligibility rules; some limited exceptions apply. Players may hold more than one non-FIFA nationality.

No.	Pos.	Nation	Player
1	GK	BRA	Adriano Basso
2	DF	ENG	Bradley Orr
3	DF	ENG	Craig Woodman
4	DF	ENG	Liam Fontaine
5	DF	ENG	Jamie McCombe
6	MF	SCO	Louis Carey
7	MF	SCO	Scott Murray
8	MF	ENG	David Noble
9	FW	ENG	Stephen Brooker
10	FW	ENG	Phil Jevons
11	FW	SEY	Kevin Betsy
11	MF	WAL	David Cotterill
12	MF	ENG	Scott Brown
14	MF	ENG	Cole Skuse
15	FW	NGR	Enoch Showunmi
16	DF	IRL	Richard Keogh
17	MF	ENG	Alex Russell
18	DF	SCO	Jamie McAllister

No.	Pos.	Nation	Player
19	FW	NIR	Andy Smith
19	FW	ENG	Marcus Stewart
20	DF	WAL	David Partridge
21	FW	ENG	Nick Wright (on loan from Birmingham City)
21	DF	ENG	Matthew Heywood
22	GK	ENG	Chris Weale
23	FW	IRL	Barry Corr
23	DF	ENG	Brian Wilson
23	MF	SCO	Grant Smith
26	MF	ENG	Jennison Myrie-Williams
27	MF	ENG	Frankie Artus
28	DF	WAL	James Wilson
29	MF	ENG	Danny Wring
32	GK	WAL	Wayne Hennessey (on loan from Wolverhampton Wanderers)
32	GK	ENG	Matt Reed
34	FW	ENG	Wayne Andrews
34	GK	ENG	John Ruddy (on loan from Everton)
34	GK	AUS	Adam Federici (on loan from Reading)
