= 2018–19 Derby County F.C. season =

Derby County
2018–19 season
- Chairman: Mel Morris
- Manager: Frank Lampard
- Stadium: Pride Park Stadium
- Championship: 6th
- Play-offs: Runners-up
- FA Cup: Fifth round (eliminated by Brighton & Hove Albion)
- EFL Cup: Fourth round (eliminated by Chelsea)
- Top goalscorer: League: Harry Wilson (15); All: Harry Wilson (18)
- Highest home attendance: 32,055 vs. West Bromwich Albion (5 May 2019)
- Lowest home attendance: 17,095 vs. Southampton (5 January 2019)
- Average home league attendance: 26,626
- Biggest win: 6–1 vs. Rotherham United (30 March 2019)
- Biggest defeat: 0–4 vs. Aston Villa (2 March 2019)
Home colours	Away colours	Third colours

The 2018–19 season was Derby County's eleventh consecutive season in the Championship in their 135th year in existence. Along with competing in the Championship, the club also participated in the FA Cup and EFL Cup. This season was Frank Lampard's sole full season as Derby County manager following Gary Rowett's move to Stoke City.

The season covers the period from 1 July 2018 to 30 June 2019.

== Competitions ==
=== Pre-season friendlies ===
The Rams revealed friendlies against Notts County, Mansfield Town, Southampton, Coventry City and Wolverhampton Wanderers.

14 July 2018 Friendly	Notts County	1–4	Derby County	Nottingham
15:00 BST	Hemmings 75'	Report	Thomas 2', 36'; Bennett; Huddlestone 83'	Stadium: Meadow Lane

18 July 2018 Friendly	Mansfield Town	3–1	Derby County	Mansfield
19:30 BST	Graham 65'; Angol 78' (pen.); Hamilton 80'	Report	Bennett 69'	Stadium: One Call Stadium

21 July 2018 Friendly	Derby County	3–0	Southampton	Derby
15:00 BST	Lawrence 58', 71'; Bennett 81'	Report		Stadium: Pride Park Stadium

25 July 2018 Friendly	Coventry City	0–1	Derby County	Nuneaton
19:45 BST		Report	Johnson 31'	Stadium: Liberty Way

28 July 2018 Friendly	Derby County	2–1	Wolverhampton Wanderers	Derby
15:00 BST	Nugent 41'; Mount 72'	Report	Jota 67'	Stadium: Pride Park Stadium

=== Championship ===
==== League table ====
Pos	Team	Pld	W	D	L	GF	GA	GD	Pts	Promotion, qualification or relegation
3	Leeds United	46	25	8	13	73	50	+23	83	Qualification for Championship play-offs (Note: Four teams play for one spot and promotion to the Premier League.)
4	West Bromwich Albion	46	23	11	12	87	62	+25	80	Qualification for Championship play-offs
5	Aston Villa (O, P)	46	20	16	10	82	61	+21	76	Qualification for Championship play-offs
6	Derby County	46	20	14	12	69	54	+15	74	Qualification for Championship play-offs
7	Middlesbrough	46	20	13	13	49	41	+8	73	
8	Bristol City	46	19	13	14	59	53	+6	70	
9	Nottingham Forest	46	17	15	14	61	54	+7	66	

Source: Sky Sports Archived 25 September 2019 at the Wayback Machine
Rules for classification: 1) Points; 2) Goal difference; 3) Number of goals scored; 4) Head-to-head results
(O) Play-off winners; (P) Promoted

==== Results by matchday ====
Matchday	1	2	3	4	5	6	7	8	9	10	11	12	13	14	15	16	17	18	19	20	21	22	23	24	25	26	27	28	29	30	31	32	33	34	35	36	37	38	39	40	41	42	43	44	45	46
Ground	A	H	A	H	H	A	A	H	H	A	H	A	H	A	A	H	H	A	A	H	A	H	H	A	A	H	A	H	A	H	A	H	A	A	H	H	H	H	A	A	H	A	H	A	A	H
Result	W	L	L	W	W	W	L	D	W	L	D	D	W	W	D	W	L	W	L	W	W	D	D	L	W	D	L	W	D	W	D	L	L	L	W	D	D	W	D	L	W	D	W	W	D	W
Position	6	11	14	11	6	4	7	8	6	9	8	8	5	5	6	5	6	6	7	7	4	4	5	6	6	6	6	6	7	7	7	7	7	7	7	6	6	6	7	9	8	8	6	6	6	6

Updated to match(es) played on 1 May 2019. Source: BBC Sport
A = Away; H = Home; W = Win; D = Draw; L = Loss

==== Result summary ====
Overall								Home						Away					
Pld	W	D	L	GF	GA	GD	Pts	W	D	L	GF	GA	GD	W	D	L	GF	GA	GD
46	20	14	12	69	54	+15	74	13	7	3	40	20	+20	7	7	9	29	34	−5

Last updated: 1 May 2019.
Source: BBC Sport

==== Matches ====
On 21 June 2018, the league fixtures were announced.

3 August 2018 1	Reading	1–2	Derby County	Reading
20:00 BST	Böðvarsson 52'	Report	Mount 60'; Lawrence 90+4', 90+13'	Stadium: Madejski Stadium; Attendance: 16,923; Referee: Robert Jones

11 August 2018 2	Derby County	1–4	Leeds United	Derby
17:30 BST	Lawrence 12'; Ledley (yellow card) 41'; Keogh (yellow card) 42'; Waghorn (yellow card) 64'; Lowe (yellow card) 81'	Report	Klich 5'; Roofe 21', 60'; Alioski 64', (yellow card) 90+3'; Bamford (yellow card) 90+2'	Stadium: Pride Park Stadium; Attendance: 27,311; Referee: Peter Bankes

18 August 2018 3	Millwall	2–1	Derby County	Bermondsey, London
15:00 BST	Gregory 7'; Williams 20'	Report	Nugent 73'	Stadium: The Den; Attendance: 13,557; Referee: Steve Martin

21 August 2018 4	Derby County	2–0	Ipswich Town	Derby
19:45 BST	Bryson (yellow card) 16'; Keogh (yellow card) 42'; Ledley 59'; Lawrence 68'	Report	Skuse (yellow card) 47'; Nsiala (yellow card) 67'	Stadium: Pride Park Stadium; Attendance: 24,362; Referee: Scott Duncan

25 August 2018 5	Derby County	2–0	Preston North End	Derby
15:00 BST	Mount 38'; Keogh 78'	Report		Stadium: Pride Park Stadium; Attendance: 25,257; Referee: David Webb

1 September 2018 6	Hull City	1–2	Derby County	Kingston upon Hull
15:00 BST	Kane 53'	Report	Waghorn 23' (pen.); Jozefzoon 88'	Stadium: KCOM Stadium; Attendance: 12,285; Referee: John Brooks

15 September 2018 7	Rotherham United	1–0	Derby County	Rotherham
15:00 BST	Wood (yellow card) 48'; Vassell (yellow card) 59'; Manning 63' (pen.); Mattock (yellow card) 67'; Taylor (yellow card) 90+6'	Report	Lawrence (red card) 58'; Waghorn (yellow card) 58'; Mount (yellow card) 60'; Keogh (yellow card) 63'; Johnson (yellow card) 87'	Stadium: New York Stadium; Attendance: 10,707; Referee: Peter Bankes

18 September 2018 8	Derby County	0–0	Blackburn Rovers	Derby
19:45 BST	Bogle (yellow card) 76'; Waghorn (yellow card) 90'	Report	Williams (yellow card) 46'; Palmer (yellow card) 49'; Lenihan (yellow card) 90+1'	Stadium: Pride Park Stadium; Attendance: 23,580; Referee: Darren England

22 September 2018 9	Derby County	3–1	Brentford	Derby
15:00 BST	Wilson 14'; Nugent 21'; Mount 28'	Report	Dalsgaard 1'	Stadium: Pride Park Stadium; Attendance: 25,110; Referee: Andrew Madley

29 September 2018 10	Bolton Wanderers	1–0	Derby County	Bolton
15:00 BST	Noone 10'; Magennis (yellow card) 25'; Olkowski (yellow card) 28'; Lowe (yellow card) 45+1'	Report	Johnson (yellow card) 44'	Stadium: University of Bolton Stadium; Attendance: 14,096; Referee: Scott Duncan

3 October 2018 11	Derby County	1–1	Norwich City	Derby
19:45 BST	Bryson 86'	Report	Klose 69'	Stadium: Pride Park Stadium; Attendance: 24,236; Referee: Geoff Eltringham

6 October 2018 12	Queens Park Rangers	1–1	Derby County	Shepherd's Bush
15:00 BST	Cameron 48'	Report	Marriott 24'	Stadium: Loftus Road Stadium; Attendance: 14,727; Referee: David Webb

20 October 2018 13	Derby County	2–1	Sheffield United	Derby
17:30 BST	Bryson 1'; Marriott 77'	Report	Basham 41' (yellow card) 70'	Stadium: Pride Park Stadium; Attendance: 27,927; Referee: Oliver Langford

24 October 2018 14	West Bromwich Albion	1–4	Derby County	West Bromwich
20:00 BST	Rodriguez 83'	Report	Marriott 10'; Lawrence 15'; Wilson 51'; Malone 71'	Stadium: The Hawthorns; Attendance: 22,848; Referee: Robert Jones

27 October 2018 15	Middlesbrough	1–1	Derby County	Middlesbrough
12:30 BST	Bogle 84' (o.g.); Ayala (yellow card) 90'	Report	Friend 19' (o.g.); Waghorn (yellow card) 33'	Stadium: Riverside Stadium; Attendance: 22,907; Referee: Simon Hooper

3 November 2018 16	Derby County	3–1	Birmingham City	Derby
15:00 GMT	Bennett 53'; Wilson 55'; Marriott 73'	Report	Jutkiewicz 10'; Camp (yellow card) 51'; Gardner (yellow card) 65'; Morrison (yellow card) 82'	Stadium: Pride Park Stadium; Attendance: 28,114; Referee: Chris Kavanagh

10 November 2018 17	Derby County	0–3	Aston Villa	Derby
15:00 GMT		Report	McGinn 74'; Abraham 78'; Hourihane 84'	Stadium: Pride Park Stadium; Attendance: 30,400; Referee: John Brooks

24 November 2018 18	Sheffield Wednesday	1–2	Derby County	Owlerton, Sheffield
15:00 GMT	Reach 12'	Report	Wilson 29'; Marriott	Stadium: Hillsborough Stadium; Attendance: 25,204; Referee: Jeremy Simpson

28 November 2018 19	Stoke City	2–1	Derby County	Stoke-on-Trent
20:00 GMT	Clucas 24'; Etebo (red card); Ince 64'		Wilson 50'	Stadium: bet365 Stadium; Attendance: 25,147; Referee: Darren England

1 December 2018 20	Derby County	2–1	Swansea City	Derby
15:00 GMT	Wilson 30', 40'	Report	Tomori 87' (o.g.)	Stadium: Pride Park Stadium; Attendance: 26,167; Referee: Andy Madley

8 December 2018 21	Wigan Athletic	0–1	Derby County	Wigan
15:00 GMT	Naismith (red card) 15'; Morsy (yellow card) 32'	Report	Marriott 21'; Wilson (yellow card) 32'; Bryson (yellow card) 76'	Stadium: DW Stadium; Attendance: 10,768; Referee: Gavin Ward

17 December 2018 22	Derby County	0–0	Nottingham Forest	Derby
19:45 GMT				Stadium: Pride Park Stadium; Attendance: 31,160; Referee: Keith Stroud

22 December 2018 23	Derby County	1–1	Bristol City	Derby
15:00 GMT	Waghorn 37'	Report	Paterson; Eros Pisano (yellow card) 90+4'	Stadium: Pride Park Stadium; Attendance: 26,719; Referee: Darren Bond

26 December 2018 24	Sheffield United	3–1	Derby County	Sheffield
15:00 GMT	Stevens (yellow card) 32'; Sharp 41'; Duffy (yellow card) 45+1'; McGoldrick 64'; Norwood (yellow card) 75'; Clarke 84'	Report	Wilson (yellow card) 28', (goal) 53'; Keogh (yellow card) 54'; Tomori (yellow card) 82'; Carson (yellow card) 89'; Nugent (yellow card) 89'	Stadium: Bramall Lane; Attendance: 28,974; Referee: Geoff Eltringham

29 December 2018 25	Norwich City	3–4	Derby County	Norwich
15:00 GMT	Zimmermann (yellow card) 5'; Godfrey 25'; Teemu Pukki 31', 81'; Aarons (yellow card) 45+4'; Vrančić (yellow card) 62'	Report	Tomori 36'; Mount 45+2'; Evans (yellow card) 66'; Jozefzoon 87'; Marriott 90+2'; Holmes (yellow card) 90+6'; Wilson (yellow card) 90+6'	Stadium: Carrow Road; Attendance: 26,866; Referee: David Webb

1 January 2019 26	Derby County	1–1	Middlesbrough	Derby
15:00 GMT	Wilson 2'	Report	Saville (yellow card) 45+5'; Hugill 52'; Bešić (yellow card) 73'	Stadium: Pride Park Stadium; Attendance: 28,123; Referee: Robert Jones

11 January 2019 27	Leeds United	2–0	Derby County	Leeds
19:45 GMT	Roofe 20' (yellow card) 54'; Harrison 47'	Report	Wisdom (yellow card) 15'; Evans (yellow card) 45+2'; Holmes (yellow card) 45+2'; Waghorn (yellow card) 90+5'	Stadium: Elland Road; Attendance: 34,668; Referee: Andy Davies

19 January 2019 28	Derby County	2–1	Reading	Derby
15:00 GMT	Holmes 3' (yellow card) 81'; Wilson 40'; Malone (yellow card) 69'	Report	Ejaria (yellow card) 65'; Aluko 66'	Stadium: Pride Park Stadium; Attendance: 26,404; Referee: Andy Woolmer

1 February 2019 29	Preston North End	0–0	Derby County	Preston
19:45 GMT	Pearson (yellow card) 28'	Report	Malone (yellow card) 90+1'	Stadium: Deepdale; Attendance: 12,124; Referee: Darren Bond

9 February 2019 30	Derby County	2–0	Hull City	Derby
15:00 GMT	Waghorn 41', 71'; Wilson (yellow card) 90+3'	Report	Ridgewell (yellow card) 90'	Stadium: Pride Park Stadium; Attendance: 28,211; Referee: Gavin Ward

13 February 2019 31	Ipswich Town	1–1	Derby County	Ipswich
19:45 GMT	Nolan 55'; Bishop (yellow card) 57'; Chalobah (yellow card) 63'; Pennington (yellow card) 90+4'	Report	Lawrence 2'; Waghorn (yellow card) 21'; Holmes (yellow card) 57'; Bennett (yellow card) 85'; Johnson (yellow card) 90+4'	Stadium: Portman Road; Attendance: 18,604; Referee: Andrew Madley

20 February 2019 32	Derby County	0–1	Millwall	Derby
19:45 GMT	Huddlestone (yellow card) 42'; Keogh (yellow card) 63'	Report	Marshall (yellow card) 44'; Wallace 72'; Williams (yellow card) 87'; Elliott (yellow card) 90+5'	Stadium: Pride Park Stadium; Attendance: 24,907; Referee: James Linington

25 February 2019 33	Nottingham Forest	1–0	Derby County	West Bridgford
19:45 GMT	Benalouane 2'; Yates (yellow card) 29'; Colback (yellow card) 82'	Report	Wilson (yellow card) 26'; Holmes (yellow card) 29'; Tomori (yellow card) 90+5'	Stadium: City Ground; Attendance: 29,421; Referee: Robert Jones

2 March 2019 34	Aston Villa	4–0	Derby County	Aston
15:00 GMT	Hourihane 9', 44' (yellow card) 24'; Abraham 37'; Grealish 45+2'; Hause (yellow card) 60'	Report	Evans (yellow card) 23'; Holmes (yellow card) 72'	Stadium: Villa Park; Attendance: 37,273; Referee: Lee Mason

5 March 2019 35	Derby County	2–1	Wigan Athletic	Derby
19:45 GMT	Johnson (yellow card) 41'; Bennett (yellow card) 59' (goal) 62'; Wilson (yellow card) 63'; Tomori (yellow card) 71'; Malone 78'	Report	Massey 25'; Morsy (yellow card) 37'	Stadium: Pride Park Stadium; Attendance: 23,655; Referee: Tony Harrington

9 March 2019 36	Derby County	1–1	Sheffield Wednesday	Derby
15:00 GMT	Johnson 10'	Report	Iorfa 57'	Stadium: Pride Park Stadium; Attendance: 28,574; Referee: Keith Stroud

13 March 2019 37	Derby County	0–0	Stoke City	Derby
19:45 GMT		Report	Williams (yellow card) 70'; Shawcross (yellow card) 89'	Stadium: Pride Park Stadium; Attendance: 25,685; Referee: Oliver Langford

30 March 2019 38	Derby County	6–1	Rotherham United	Derby
15:00 GMT	Waghorn 13' (pen.), 42', 71' (pen.); Johnson 39'; Mount 48'; Holmes 62'	Report	Wood 53'; Crooks (yellow card) 90+2'	Stadium: Pride Park Stadium; Attendance: 27,003; Referee: Tim Robinson

6 April 2019 39	Brentford	3–3	Derby County	Brentford
15:00 BST	Dalsgaard (yellow card) 15'; Jeanvier 23'; Maupay 31'; Henry (yellow card) 50'; Benrahma 83'; Canós (yellow card) 90+2'	Report	Wilson 13', 78'; Bogle (yellow card) 19' (goal) 26'; Johnson (yellow card) 22'; Cole (yellow card) 49'; Lawrence (yellow card) 69'; Tomori (yellow card) 90+2'	Stadium: Griffin Park; Attendance: 12,225; Referee: John Brooks

9 April 2019 40	Blackburn Rovers	2–0	Derby County	Blackburn
19:45 BST	Bennett (yellow card) 51'; Rothwell 76'; Travis (yellow card) 85'; Dack 90+2'	Report		Stadium: Ewood Park; Attendance: 12,590; Referee: Jeremy Simpson

13 April 2019 41	Derby County	4–0	Bolton Wanderers	Derby
15:00 BST	Johnson (yellow card) 28'; Bryson 37'; Mount 45+1', 55', 82'	Report	Ameobi (yellow card) 31'	Stadium: Pride Park Stadium; Attendance: 26,602; Referee: Andy Davies

19 April 2019 42	Birmingham City	2–2	Derby County	Birmingham
15:00 BST	Jutkiewicz 2' (yellow card) 56'; Morrison 18'; Gardner (yellow card) 38'; Adams (yellow card) 90+2'	Report	Waghorn 7' (yellow card) 48'; Keogh 28'; Bryson (yellow card) 45+2'; Cole (yellow card) 66'	Stadium: St Andrew's; Attendance: 23,902; Referee: Simon Hooper

22 April 2019 43	Derby County	2–0	Queens Park Rangers	Derby
15:00 BST	Wilson 90+4' (pen.), 90+11'; Bennett (yellow card) 90+9'	Report	Wszołek (yellow card) 42'; Scowen (yellow card) 54'; Luongo (yellow card) 67'	Stadium: Pride Park Stadium; Attendance: 25,986; Referee: David Webb

27 April 2019 44	Bristol City	0–2	Derby County	Bristol
15:00 BST	Semenyo (red card) 59'	Report	Lawrence 18' (yellow card) 63'; Bogle (yellow card) 21' (goal) 77'; Mount (yellow card) 29'; Bennett (yellow card) 90+3'	Stadium: Ashton Gate; Attendance: 25,556; Referee: Darren Bond

1 May 2019 45	Swansea City	1–1	Derby County	Swansea
19:45 BST	Grimes (yellow card) 16'; McBurnie (yellow card) 49' van der Hoorn (yellow card) 49'; Routledge 66'	Report	Keogh 21'; Wilson (yellow card) 45+2'; Huddlestone (yellow card) 76'; Bogle (yellow card) 79'; Bennett (yellow card) 90+4'	Stadium: Liberty Stadium; Attendance: 18,434; Referee: Peter Bankes

5 May 2019 46	Derby County	3–1	West Bromwich Albion	Derby
12:30 BST	Waghorn 19'; Bennett 70'; Wilson 73' (pen.)	Report	Johansen 47'	Stadium: Pride Park Stadium; Attendance: 32,055; Referee: Tim Robinson

==== Play-offs ====
11 May 2019 Semi-final first leg	Derby County	0–1	Leeds United	Derby
17:15 BST	Lawrence (yellow card) 55'; Keogh (yellow card) 67'; Holmes (yellow card) 68'; Huddlestone (yellow card) 89'	Report	Roofe 55'; Berardi (yellow card) 63'; Cooper (yellow card) 65'; Klich (yellow card) 87'	Stadium: Pride Park Stadium; Attendance: 31,723; Referee: Craig Pawson

15 May 2019 Semi-final second leg	Leeds United	2–4 (3–4 agg.)	Derby County	Leeds
19:45 BST	Hernández (yellow card) 20'; Dallas 24', 62'; Phillips (yellow card) 27'; Bamford (yellow card) 31'; Cooper (yellow card) 57'; Berardi (yellow card) 69' (yellow-red card) 78'	Report	Tomori (yellow card) 5'; Malone (yellow card) 20' (yellow-red card) 90+1'; Lawrence (yellow card) 20'; Marriott 45', 85'; Mount 46' (yellow card) 65'; Wilson 58' (pen.)	Stadium: Elland Road; Attendance: 36,326; Referee: Anthony Taylor

27 May 2019 Final	Aston Villa	2–1	Derby County	Wembley Stadium, London
15:00 BST	El Ghazi (yellow card) 28' (goal) 44'; Hourihane (yellow card) 48'; McGinn 59'	Report	Bennett (yellow card) 47'; Tomori (yellow card) 51'; Marriott 81'; Wilson (yellow card) 90+2'	Attendance: 85,826; Referee: Paul Tierney

=== EFL Cup ===
On 15 June 2018, the draw for the first round was made in Vietnam. The second round draw was made from the Stadium of Light on 16 August, with the third round draw made on 30 August. The draw for the fourth round took place on 29 September, broadcast live on the Quest highlights show EFL on Quest.

14 August 2018 First round	Oldham Athletic	0–2	Derby County	Oldham
19:45 BST		Report	Tomori 36'; Mount 70'	Stadium: Boundary Park; Attendance: 3,376; Referee: Darren Bond

28 August 2018 Second round	Hull City	0–4	Derby County	Kingston upon Hull
19:45 BST			Waghorn 24'; Jozefzoon 39'; Fleming 73' (o.g.); Mount 89'	Stadium: KCOM Stadium; Attendance: 4,666; Referee: Oliver Langford

25 September 2018 Third round	Manchester United	2–2 (7–8 p)	Derby County	Old Trafford, Manchester
20:00 BST	Mata 3'; Lingard (yellow card) 54'; Romero (red card) 67'; Fellaini 90+5'; Matić (yellow card) 90+7'	Report	Bennett (yellow card) 25'; Forsyth (yellow card) 48'; Wilson 59'; Marriott 85'	Stadium: Old Trafford; Attendance: 55,227; Referee: Stuart Attwell
	Penalties
	Lukaku (penalty scored); Young (penalty scored); Fellaini (penalty scored); Fred (penalty scored); Martial (penalty scored); Dalot (penalty scored); Matić (penalty scored); Jones (penalty missed)		Mount (penalty scored); Jozefzoon (penalty scored); Wilson (penalty scored); Marriott (penalty scored); Johnson (penalty scored); Bryson (penalty scored); Forsyth (penalty scored); Keogh (penalty scored)

31 October 2018 Fourth round	Chelsea	3–2	Derby County	Fulham
19:45 GMT	Tomori 5' (o.g.); Keogh 21' (o.g.); Fàbregas 41'; Emerson (yellow card) 84'	Report	Marriott 9'; Waghorn 27'; Keogh (yellow card) 90+3'	Stadium: Stamford Bridge; Attendance: 39,564; Referee: Jonathan Moss

=== FA Cup ===
The third round draw was made live on BBC by Ruud Gullit and Paul Ince from Stamford Bridge on 3 December 2018. The fourth round draw was made live on BBC by Robbie Keane and Carl Ikeme from Wolverhampton on 7 January 2019. The fifth round draw was broadcast on 28 January 2019 live on BBC; Alex Scott and Ian Wright conducted the draw.

5 January 2019 Third round	Derby County	2–2	Southampton	Derby
15:00 GMT	Marriott 58' (yellow card) 87'; Lawrence 61'; Bryson (yellow card) 64'	Report	Redmond 4', 48'; Elyounoussi (yellow card) 33'	Stadium: Pride Park Stadium; Attendance: 17,095; Referee: Oliver Langford

16 January 2019 Third round replay	Southampton	2–2 (3–5 p)	Derby County	Southampton
19:45 GMT	Johnson (yellow card) 16'; Armstrong 68'; Redmond 70'; Soares (yellow card) 75'	Report	Wilson 76'; Waghorn 82'	Stadium: St. Mary's Stadium; Attendance: 14,651; Referee: Anthony Taylor
	Penalties
	Ward-Prowse (penalty scored); Redmond (penalty missed); Vestergaard (penalty scored); Targett (penalty scored)		Waghorn (penalty scored); Nugent (penalty scored); Mount (penalty scored); Lawrence (penalty scored); Keogh (penalty scored)

26 January 2019 Fourth round	Accrington Stanley	0–1	Derby County	Accrington
12:30 GMT	Barlaser (yellow card) 3' (yellow-red card) 59'	Report	Waghorn 78'; Bogle (yellow card) 86' (red card) 90'; Jozefzoon (yellow card) 90+3'; Nugent (yellow card) 90+4'	Stadium: Crown Ground; Attendance: 5,397; Referee: Jonathan Moss

16 February 2019 Fifth round	Brighton & Hove Albion	2–1	Derby County	Falmer
12:30 GMT	Knockaert 33'; Locadia 45+2'; Bissouma (yellow card) 76'; Jahanbakhsh (yellow card) 90+4'	Report	Tomori (yellow card) 20'; Wilson (yellow card) 28'; Malone (yellow card) 35'; Cole 81'	Stadium: Falmer Stadium; Attendance: 24,562; Referee: David Coote

== Statistics ==
=== Appearances and goals ===
Last updated on 27 May 2019

No.	Pos	Nat	Player	Total		Championship		League Cup		FA Cup		Play-offs	
No.	Pos	Nat	Player	Apps	Goals	Apps	Goals	Apps	Goals	Apps	Goals	Apps	Goals
Goalkeepers
1	GK	(England) ENG	Scott Carson	33	0	30	0	3	0	0	0	0	0
21	GK	(Netherlands) NED	Kelle Roos	24	0	16	0	1	0	4	0	3	0
47	GK	(Slovakia) SVK	Henrich Ravas	0	0	0	0	0	0	0	0	0	0
Defenders
2	DF	(England) ENG	Andre Wisdom	13	0	9+2	0	1+1	0	0	0	0	0
3	DF	(Scotland) SCO	Craig Forsyth	15	0	10+3	0	1+1	0	0	0	0	0
5	DF	(England) ENG	Fikayo Tomori	55	2	43+1	1	4	1	4	0	3	0
6	DF	(Republic of Ireland) IRL	Richard Keogh	57	3	46	3	4	0	4	0	3	0
12	DF	(Nigeria) NGA	Efe Ambrose	0	0	0	0	0	0	0	0	0	0
26	DF	(England) ENG	Ashley Cole	12	1	6+3	0	0	0	0+1	1	1+1	0
29	DF	(Sweden) SWE	Marcus Olsson	0	0	0	0	0	0	0	0	0	0
33	DF	(England) ENG	Curtis Davies	8	0	5+3	0	0	0	0	0	0	0
37	DF	(England) ENG	Jayden Bogle	49	2	39+1	2	3	0	3	0	3	0
39	DF	(Scotland) SCO	Calum MacDonald	0	0	0	0	0	0	0	0	0	0
46	DF	(England) ENG	Scott Malone	36	2	24+3	2	3	0	4	0	2	0
48	DF	(England) ENG	Lee Buchanan	0	0	0	0	0	0	0	0	0	0
Midfielders
4	MF	(Scotland) SCO	Craig Bryson	32	3	25+3	3	1	0	3	0	0	0
7	MF	(Wales) WAL	Harry Wilson	49	18	37+3	15	3	1	3	1	3	1
8	MF	(England) ENG	Mason Mount	44	11	35	8	4	2	2	0	3	1
10	FW	(Wales) WAL	Tom Lawrence	39	7	28+5	6	1	0	1+1	1	3	0
11	MF	(Netherlands) NED	Florian Jozefzoon	34	3	13+14	2	2+1	1	0+3	0	0+1	0
15	MF	(England) ENG	Bradley Johnson	34	2	22+6	2	3	0	0	0	3	0
17	MF	(England) ENG	George Evans	14	0	6+5	0	1	0	2	0	0	0
23	MF	(United States) USA	Duane Holmes	32	2	16+9	2	0+1	0	3+1	0	2	0
30	MF	(Scotland) SCO	Ikechi Anya	0	0	0	0	0	0	0	0	0	0
40	MF	(England) ENG	Louie Sibley	0	0	0	0	0	0	0	0	0	0
41	MF	(England) ENG	Max Bird	8	0	1+3	0	0+2	0	1+1	0	0	0
43	MF	(England) ENG	Jayden Mitchell-Lawson	1	0	0+1	0	0	0	0	0	0	0
44	MF	(England) ENG	Tom Huddlestone	31	0	21+3	0	2	0	2	0	1+2	0
50	MF	(Republic of Ireland) IRL	Jason Knight	0	0	0	0	0	0	0	0	0	0
Forwards
9	FW	(England) ENG	Martyn Waghorn	44	13	29+7	9	2+1	2	3+1	2	0+1	0
14	FW	(England) ENG	Jack Marriott	43	13	19+14	7	3+1	2	2+1	1	0+3	3
20	FW	(England) ENG	Mason Bennett	38	3	9+21	3	1+2	0	0+2	0	2+1	0
28	FW	(England) ENG	David Nugent	38	2	11+20	2	1+1	0	2+2	0	1	0
49	FW	(England) ENG	Tyree Wilson	0	0	0	0	0	0	0	0	0	0
Players transferred or loaned out during the season
16	DF	(Republic of Ireland) IRL	Alex Pearce	1	0	0+1	0	0	0	0	0	0	0
24	MF	(Wales) WAL	Andy King	4	0	2+2	0	0	0	0	0	0	0
25	DF	(England) ENG	Max Lowe	1	0	0	0	0+1	0	0	0	0	0

=== Goals record ===
As of 27 May 2019

Rank	No.	Nat.	Po.	Name	Championship	FA Cup	League Cup	Championship play-offs	Total
1	7	(Wales)	LW	Harry Wilson	15	1	1	1	18
2	9	(England)	CF	Martyn Waghorn	9	2	2	0	13
3	8	(England)	AM	Mason Mount	8	0	2	1	11
3	14	(England)	CF	Jack Marriott	7	1	2	3	13
5	10	(Wales)	RW	Tom Lawrence	6	1	0	0	7
6	4	(Scotland)	CM	Craig Bryson	3	0	0	0	3
6	11	(Netherlands)	RW	Florian Jozefzoon	2	0	1	0	3
6	20	(England)	LW	Mason Bennett	3	0	0	0	3
6	6	(Republic of Ireland)	CB	Richard Keogh	3	0	0	0	3
10	5	(England)	CB	Fikayo Tomori	1	0	1	0	2
10	15	(England)	CM	Bradley Johnson	2	0	0	0	2
10	23	(United States)	RM	Duane Holmes	2	0	0	0	2
10	28	(England)	CF	David Nugent	2	0	0	0	2
10	46	(England)	LB	Scott Malone	2	0	0	0	2
10	37	(England)	RB	Jayden Bogle	2	0	0	0	2
16	26	(England)	LB	Ashley Cole	0	1	0	0	1
16	36	(Wales)	CM	Joe Ledley	1	0	0	0	1
Own goals					1	0	1	0	2
Total					69	6	10	5	90

== Transfers ==
=== Transfers in ===
Date from	Position	Nationality	Name	From	Fee	Ref.
1 July 2018	FW	IRL	Festy Ebosele	Bray Wanderers (IRL)	Undisclosed	
6 July 2018	RB	ENG	Aaron Eyoma	Arsenal	Free transfer	
20 July 2018	RW	NED	Florian Jozefzoon	Brentford	Undisclosed	
26 July 2018	CF	ENG	Jack Marriott	Peterborough United	Undisclosed	
31 July 2018	DM	ENG	George Evans	Reading	Undisclosed	
8 August 2018	LB	ENG	Scott Malone	Huddersfield Town	Undisclosed	
8 August 2018	CF	ENG	Martyn Waghorn	Ipswich Town	Undisclosed	
9 August 2018	RM	USA	Duane Holmes	Scunthorpe United	Undisclosed	
14 August 2018	GK	IRL	Harry Halwax	Leixlip United (IRL)	Undisclosed	
13 October 2018	AM	ENG	Josh Shonibare	Greenwich Borough	Undisclosed	
21 January 2019	LB	ENG	Ashley Cole	LA Galaxy (USA)	Free transfer	
15 February 2019	CB	NGA	Efe Ambrose	Hibernian (SCO)	Free transfer	

=== Transfers out ===
Date from	Position	Nationality	Name	To	Fee	Ref.
1 July 2018	DM	NIR	Chris Baird	Free agent	Released	
1 July 2018	CF	ENG	Darren Bent	Free agent	Released	
1 July 2018	CB	ENG	Alex Cover	Free agent	Released	
1 July 2018	CF	ENG	Adam Davie	Georgia Southern Eagles (USA)	Undisclosed	
1 July 2018	GK	ENG	Joe Fryatt	Boston College Eagles (USA)	Undisclosed	
1 July 2018	CM	ENG	Jack Haywood	Butler Bulldogs (USA)	Undisclosed	
1 July 2018	RW	SWE	Ayomide Jibodu	Dynamo Brest (BLR)	Released	
1 July 2018	CF	DEN	Emil Riis Jakobsen	Randers (DEN)	Released	
1 July 2018	LB	ENG	Jordan Mills	Redditch United	Free transfer	
1 July 2018	CB	ENG	Jason Shackell	Lincoln City	Released	
1 July 2018	RB	ENG	Kyron Stabana	Free agent	Released	
1 July 2018	LB	ENG	Matthew Taylor	Oxford United	Released	
1 July 2018	CB	ENG	Cain Thomas	Free agent	Released	
3 July 2018	RW	AUT	Andreas Weimann	Bristol City	£2,000,000	
24 July 2018	AM	ENG	Charles Vernam	Grimsby Town	Undisclosed	
2 August 2018	CF	CGO	Offrande Zanzala	Accrington Stanley	Undisclosed	
7 August 2018	CF	CZE	Matěj Vydra	Burnley	Undisclosed	
9 August 2018	DM	ENG	Jamie Hanson	Oxford United	Undisclosed	
31 August 2018	CF	ENG	Cameron Jerome	Göztepe (TUR)	Undisclosed	
6 November 2018	LW	ENG	Lewis Walker	Queens Park Rangers	Free transfer	
1 January 2019	CM	ENG	Callum Guy	Blackpool	Undisclosed	
31 January 2019	CM	WAL	Joe Ledley	Free agent	Mutual consent	
8 March 2019	MF	ENG	Zaid Al Hussaini	Free agent	Mutual consent	
8 March 2019	CM	ENG	Henry Wise	Free agent	Mutual consent	

=== Loans in ===
Start date	Position	Nationality	Name	From	End date	Ref.
17 July 2018	AM	ENG	Mason Mount	Chelsea	31 May 2019	
17 July 2018	RW	WAL	Harry Wilson	Liverpool	31 May 2019	
6 August 2018	CB	ENG	Fikayo Tomori	Chelsea	31 May 2019	
31 January 2019	CM	WAL	Andy King	Leicester City	31 May 2019	
4 February 2019	AM	IRL	Rowan Roache	Blackpool	31 May 2019	

=== Loans out ===
Start date	Position	Nationality	Name	To	End date	Ref.
13 August 2018	GK	ENG	Jonathan Mitchell	Oxford United	January 2019	
15 August 2018	RW	ENG	Nick Blackman	Sporting Gijón (ESP)	31 May 2019	
16 August 2018	RW	ENG	Luke Thomas	Coventry City	31 May 2019	
28 August 2018	RW	ENG	Kellan Gordon	Lincoln City	January 2019	
30 August 2018	LB	ENG	Max Lowe	Aberdeen (SCO)	January 2019	
31 August 2018	AM	WAL	Alex Babos	Real Unión (ESP)	14 January 2019	
31 August 2018	CM	SVN	Timi Elšnik	Mansfield Town	16 January 2019	
31 August 2018	CM	ENG	Callum Guy	Blackpool	1 January 2019	
31 August 2018	CF	SCO	Chris Martin	Hull City	31 May 2019	
12 October 2018	CB	ENG	Ethan Wassall	Hereford	November 2018	
12 October 2018	GK	ENG	Matthew Yates	Hereford	31 May 2019	
14 December 2018	RB	ENG	Aaron Eyoma	Woking	January 2019	
4 January 2019	CB	IRL	Alex Pearce	Millwall	31 May 2019	
7 January 2019	DM	ENG	George Thorne	Luton Town	31 May 2019	
18 January 2019	RW	SCO	Kyle McAllister	St Mirren (SCO)	31 May 2019	
24 January 2019	CB	SWE	Fuseine Rashid	Barwell	February 2019	
24 January 2019	FW	ENG	Jauvan Splatt	Barwell	February 2019	
25 January 2019	CM	SVN	Timi Elšnik	Northampton Town	31 May 2019	
31 January 2019	CM	ENG	Jacob Butterfield	Bradford City	31 May 2019	
31 January 2019	GK	ENG	Jonathan Mitchell	Shrewsbury Town	31 May 2019	
8 March 2019	RB	ENG	Aaron Eyoma	Braintree Town	April 2019	
28 March 2019	CB	SVN	Sven Karič	Braintree Town	31 May 2019	
28 March 2019	FW	ENG	Jauvan Splatt	Mickleover Sports	31 May 2019	
