= 2002–03 Irish League =

Irish League Premier Division
- Season: 2002–03
- Champions: Glentoran; 21st Irish title
- Matches: 228
- Goals: 597 (2.62 per match)
- Top goalscorer: Vinny Arkins (29 goals)

The 2002–03 Irish League was the 102nd edition of the Irish League, the highest level of league competition in Northern Irish football. The league consisted of 12 teams, and Glentoran won the championship.

== Premier Division ==
Location of teams in the 2002–03 Irish League Premier Division
Location of the Belfast-based teams in the 2002–03 Irish League Premier Division

=== League standings ===
Pos	Team	Pld	W	D	L	GF	GA	GD	Pts	Qualification
1	Glentoran (C)	38	28	6	4	78	22	+56	90	Qualification for the Champions League first qualifying round
2	Portadown	38	24	8	6	89	36	+53	80	Qualification for the UEFA Cup qualifying round
3	Coleraine	38	21	10	7	66	38	+28	73	Qualification for the UEFA Cup qualifying round
4	Linfield	38	17	12	9	70	41	+29	63	
5	Omagh Town	38	15	6	17	47	57	−10	51	Qualification for the Intertoto Cup first round
6	Institute	38	12	6	20	44	75	−31	42	
7	Ards	38	12	10	16	27	39	−12	46	
8	Lisburn Distillery	38	12	6	20	39	49	−10	42	
9	Cliftonville	38	9	14	15	37	43	−6	41	
10	Glenavon	38	8	12	18	41	67	−26	36	
11	Crusaders	38	9	9	20	26	61	−35	36	
12	Newry Town	38	8	7	23	33	69	−36	31	Qualification for the promotion/relegation play-off

Source: rsssf.com
(C) Champions

=== Results ===
==== Matches 1–22 ====
During matches 1–22 each team plays every other team twice (home and away).

Home \ Away	ARD	CLI	COL	CRU	GLV	GLT	INS	LIN	DIS	NEW	OMA	POR
Ards		0–0	0–1	2–2	1–1	1–2	3–0	1–2	1–0	2–1	0–0	0–2
Cliftonville	1–0		1–1	0–1	3–1	0–1	2–0	2–2	0–2	1–0	2–1	0–3
Coleraine	2–0	1–1		3–3	3–2	0–0	3–0	3–1	1–4	3–0	0–1	1–0
Crusaders	0–2	0–0	0–0		0–2	2–4	1–0	1–3	0–2	0–0	0–3	0–4
Glenavon	1–1	2–1	2–2	1–1		0–3	3–1	0–0	1–2	3–2	1–3	0–5
Glentoran	3–0	3–0	2–0	4–0	2–0		4–1	3–2	2–0	3–1	2–0	0–1
Institute	2–0	1–1	1–3	2–0	0–0	1–5		1–0	0–1	3–2	0–0	3–3
Linfield	3–1	2–2	2–0	2–0	1–1	1–1	2–3		1–4	3–0	3–1	0–1
Lisburn Distillery	1–0	0–3	1–1	2–1	0–2	1–3	1–2	0–2		2–1	1–2	2–4
Newry Town	1–3	0–3	0–2	0–3	2–2	0–2	1–0	0–6	1–0		1–4	0–0
Omagh Town	0–1	2–1	0–3	2–1	3–1	0–2	3–2	1–1	3–0	0–2		1–1
Portadown	1–1	1–0	1–2	1–0	6–0	2–0	4–1	3–1	3–0	4–2	3–1	

Source: Irish League Archive
Legend: Blue = home team win; Yellow = draw; Red = away team win.

==== Matches 23–33 ====
During matches 23–33 each team will play every other team for the third time (either at home, or away).

Home \ Away	ARD	CLI	COL	CRU	GLV	GLT	INS	LIN	DIS	NEW	OMA	POR
Ards		0–0		0–0		0–2	1–0			1–0		0–3
Cliftonville				0–1		0–2	1–3			1–1		
Coleraine	3–1	4–3			4–1				2–1		0–1	
Crusaders			0–2		2–0			0–5		0–2	2–0	0–5
Glenavon	3–0	1–1				0–1	0–2	2–2	0–2			
Glentoran			1–0	0–1			6–1	0–0		2–1		1–0
Institute			0–1	2–1				2–0		0–1	3–1	1–0
Linfield	1–0	0–0	2–0							4–0		3–2
Lisburn Distillery	0–1	1–1		0–1		0–1	1–1	1–2				
Newry Town			0–0		2–2				0–1		0–1	0–3
Omagh Town	0–1	2–1			2–0	0–4		1–1	0–3			
Portadown		2–1	1–5		2–1				1–1		5–1	

Legend: Blue = home team win; Yellow = draw; Red = away team win.

==== Matches 34–38 ====
During matches 34–38 each team will play every other team in their half of the table once. As this is the fourth time that teams play each other this season, home sides are chosen so that they will have played each other twice at home and twice away.

===== Section A =====
Home \ Away	COL	GLT	INS	LIN	OMA	POR
Coleraine		2–2	2–1	3–1		1–1
Glentoran					0–0	
Institute		0–4				
Linfield		1–1	7–0		1–0	
Omagh Town	0–2		4–1			3–5
Portadown		3–0	3–3	0–0		

Legend: Blue = home team win; Yellow = draw; Red = away team win.

===== Section B =====
Home \ Away	ARD	CLI	CRU	GLV	DIS	NEW
Ards		0–0		1–0	1–0	
Cliftonville				2–0	1–0	
Crusaders	0–0	1–0			1–1	
Glenavon			2–0			3–2
Lisburn Distillery				0–0		1–2
Newry Town	1–0	1–1	3–0			

Source: Irish League Archive
Legend: Blue = home team win; Yellow = draw; Red = away team win.

== First Division ==
Irish League First Division
- Champions: Dungannon Swifts
- Promoted: Dungannon Swifts; Ballymena United; Limavady United; Larne
- Relegated: Bangor; Carrick Rangers; Ballyclare Comrades; Armagh City
- Matches: 112
- Goals: 377 (3.37 per match)

Location of teams in the 2002–03 Irish League First Division

=== League standings ===
Pos	Team	Pld	W	D	L	GF	GA	GD	Pts	Promotion or relegation
1	Dungannon Swifts (C, P)	28	18	6	4	61	32	+29	60	Promotion to the Irish Premier League
2	Ballymena United (P)	28	16	6	6	71	40	+31	54	Promotion to the Irish Premier League
3	Limavady United (P)	28	15	5	8	53	37	+16	50	Promotion to the Irish Premier League
4	Larne (P)	28	13	4	11	35	30	+5	43	Promotion to the Irish Premier League
5	Bangor (R)	28	12	5	11	40	39	+1	41	Qualification for the promotion/relegation play-off
6	Carrick Rangers (R)	28	8	4	16	44	76	−32	28	Entered the Irish First Division
7	Ballyclare Comrades (R)	28	6	4	18	36	65	−29	22	Entered the Irish First Division
8	Armagh City (R)	28	4	6	18	37	58	−21	18	Entered the Irish First Division

Source: rsssf.com
(C) Champions; (P) Promoted; (R) Relegated

== Promotion/relegation play-off ==
Newry Town, who finished in the relegation play-off place, faced Bangor, the 5th-placed team in the First Division, in a two-legged tie for a place in next season's Irish Premier League.

6 May 2003

Bangor	0 – 0	Newry Town

Clandeboye Park, Bangor

9 May 2003

Newry Town	2 – 1	Bangor

The Showgrounds, Newry

Newry Town won 2–1 on aggregate
