= Jayden Bogle =

English footballer (born 2000)

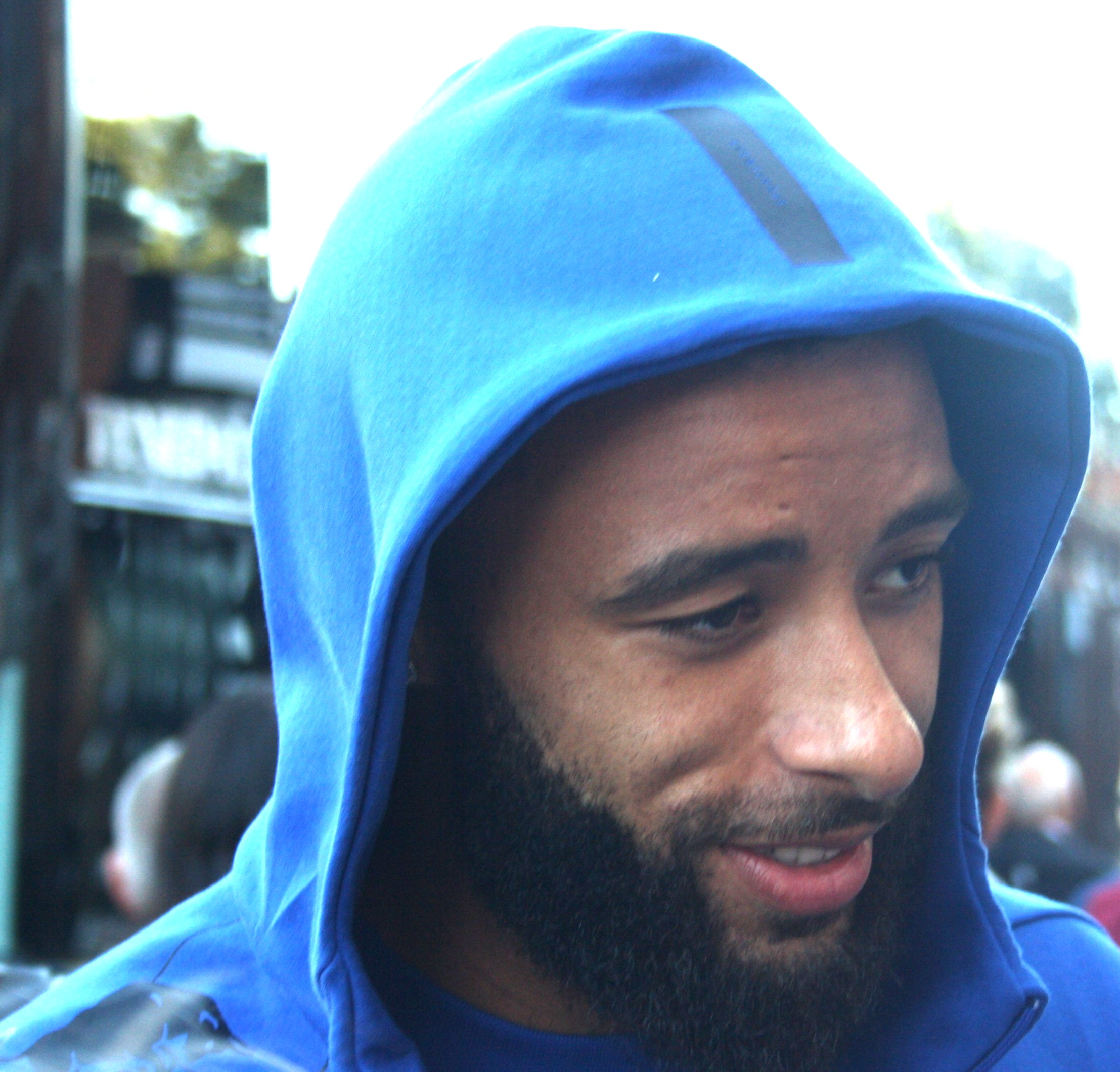
- Bogle with Leeds United in 2025

Personal information
- Full name: Jayden Ian Bogle
- Date of birth: 27 July 2000 (age 26)
- Place of birth: Reading, England
- Height: 5 ft 10 in (1.78 m)
- Positions: Right wing-back; right-back

Team information
- Current team: Leeds United
- Number: 2

Youth career
- Reading
- –2016: Swindon Town
- 2016–2018: Derby County

Senior career*
Years	Team	Apps	(Gls)
2018–2020	Derby County	77	(3)
2020–2024	Sheffield United	88	(10)
2024–	Leeds United	88	(8)

International career^{‡}
2019	England U20	4	(0)
- * Club domestic league appearances and goals as of 17:40, 7 November 2026 (UTC) ‡ National team caps and goals as of 05:02, 7 February 2026 (UTC)

Jayden Ian Bogle (born 27 July 2000) is an English professional footballer who plays as a right wing-back or right-back for Premier League club Leeds United.

== Club career ==
=== Early career ===
Bogle started his career at Southcote Colts then went into the youth set-up at Reading, before being released at the age of 14. He then joined Swindon Тown, playing there for 10 months before joining Derby County's youth set-up on 20 January 2016, ahead of leaving full-time education in the summer. After he joined Derby, Bogle mainly featured for the under-18s during the 2016–17 and 2017–18 seasons, with sporadic appearances in the under-23 Premier League 2 side. In February 2018, he signed a new contract with Derby until end of the 2018–19 season. At the end of the 2017–18 season, he was promoted to the first team squad ahead of the 2018–19 season.

Under new manager Frank Lampard, Bogle featured regularly for the first team in the 2018–19 pre-season; his performance earned the praise of central defender Curtis Davies who stated that he looked like a "first team player". Bogle featured as an unused substitute in Derby's first game of the Championship campaign at Reading. He made his senior debut on 14 August 2018, in a 2–0 win at Oldham Athletic in a first round EFL Cup tie, playing the full 90 minutes, when he received praise from Lampard for his performance. On 18 August, Bogle made his league debut starting in the 2–1 loss at Millwall, playing the whole game. He committed his future to Derby County by signing a new four-year contract on 27 September 2018. He scored his first senior goal in a 3–3 draw to Brentford, at Griffin Park.

=== Sheffield United ===
On 7 September 2020, Premier League club Sheffield United announced the signing of Bogle on a four-year contract. On 20 December 2020, Bogle scored on his league debut for the Blades as a substitute for Rhian Brewster in a 1–1 away draw against Brighton & Hove Albion.

=== Leeds United ===
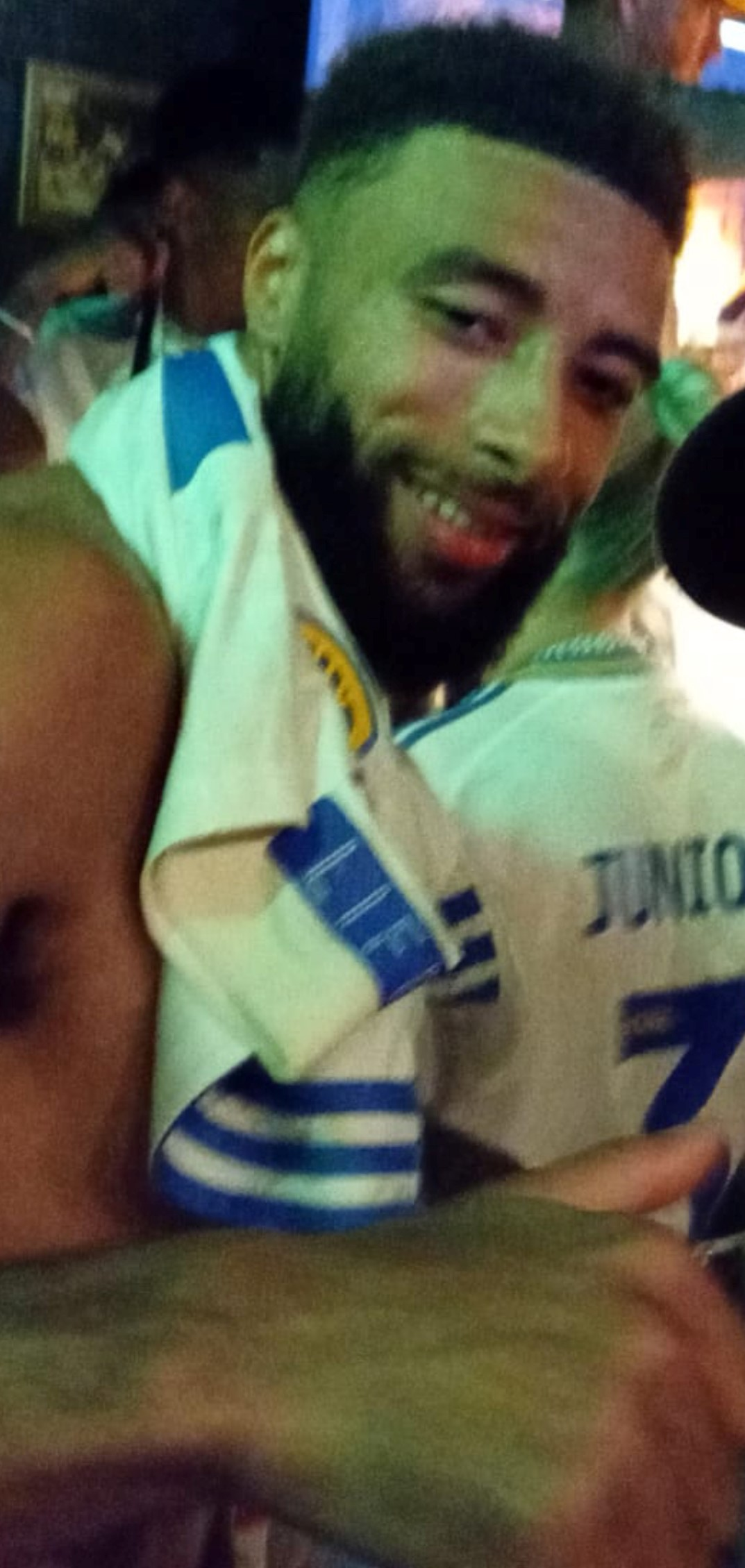
Bogle celebrating with a fan following Leeds United’s promotion to the Premier League in May 2025.

On 20 July 2024, Championship club Leeds United announced the signing of Bogle on a four-year contract for an undisclosed fee. On 10 August, he made his league debut for the club in a 3–3 draw against Portsmouth. On 28 September, Bogle scored his first goal with the club in a 3–0 win against Coventry City at Elland Road.

Bogle recorded a career-high six goals, adding four assists, during the 2024–25 season, which saw Leeds get promoted back to the Premier League and win the EFL Championship title. He was voted to the 2024–25 EFL Championship Team of the Season, along with teammates Daniel James and Ao Tanaka.

He scored his first Premier League goal for Leeds on 6 February 2026, the first goal in The Whites' 3–1 win over Nottingham Forest.

On 20 August 2026, Bogle signed a new contract with Leeds United, running until June 2030.

== International career ==
In May 2019, Bogle received his first call up to the England U20 squad for the 2019 Toulon Tournament and made his debut during the 4–0 win over Guatemala on 11 June 2019.

== Career statistics ==
As of match played 14 September 2026

Appearances and goals by club, season and competition
Club	Season	League			FA Cup		EFL Cup		Other		Total	
Club	Season	Division	Apps	Goals	Apps	Goals	Apps	Goals	Apps	Goals	Apps	Goals
Derby County	2017–18	Championship	0	0	0	0	0	0	—		0	0
Derby County	2018–19	Championship	40	2	4	0	3	0	3 (Note: Appearances in Championship play-offs)	0	50	2
Derby County	2019–20	Championship	37	1	3	0	0	0	—		40	1
Derby County	Total		77	3	7	0	3	0	3	0	90	3
Sheffield United	2020–21	Premier League	16	2	4	1	1	0	—		21	3
Sheffield United	2021–22	Championship	18	3	1	0	3	0	0	0	22	3
Sheffield United	2022–23	Championship	20	2	4	1	0	0	—		24	3
Sheffield United	2023–24	Premier League	34	3	1	0	1	0	—		36	3
Sheffield United	Total		88	10	10	2	5	0	0	0	103	12
Leeds United	2024–25	Championship	44	6	0	0	1	0	—		45	6
Leeds United	2025–26	Premier League	34	1	4	0	1	1	—		39	2
Leeds United	2026–27	Premier League	4	2	0	0	1	0	—		5	2
Leeds United	Total		82	9	4	0	3	1	—		89	10
Career total			247	22	21	2	11	1	3	0	282	25

== Honours ==
Sheffield United

- EFL Championship second-place promotion: 2022–23

Leeds United

- EFL Championship: 2024–25

Individual

- Derby County Young Player of the Season: 2018–19
- EFL Championship Team of the Season: 2024–25
- PFA Team of the Year: 2024–25 Championship
