= 2001–02 Irish League =

Irish League Premier Division
- Season: 2001–02
- Champions: Portadown; 4th Irish title
- Matches played: 180
- Goals scored: 506 (2.81 per match)
- Top goalscorer: Vinny Arkins (30 goals)

The 2001–02 Irish League was the 101st edition of the Irish League, the highest level of league competition in Northern Irish football. The league consisted of 10 teams, and Portadown won the championship.

== Premier Division ==
Location of teams in the 2001–02 Irish League Premier Division
Location of the Belfast-based teams in the 2001–02 Irish League Premier Division

=== League standings ===
Pos	Team	Pld	W	D	L	GF	GA	GD	Pts	Qualification
1	Portadown (C)	36	22	9	5	75	34	+41	75	Qualification for the Champions League first qualifying round
2	Glentoran	36	21	11	4	63	23	+40	74	Qualification for the UEFA Cup qualifying round
3	Linfield	36	17	11	8	64	35	+29	62	Qualification for the UEFA Cup qualifying round
4	Coleraine	36	19	2	15	64	58	+6	59	Qualification for the Intertoto Cup first round
5	Omagh Town	36	15	9	12	55	55	0	54	
6	Cliftonville	36	9	11	16	37	46	−9	38	
7	Glenavon	36	9	9	18	37	57	−20	36	
8	Newry Town	36	8	12	16	40	62	−22	36	
9	Crusaders	36	9	7	20	41	65	−24	34	
10	Ards	36	6	9	21	30	71	−41	27	

Source: rsssf.com
(C) Champions

=== Results ===
==== Matches 1–18 ====
Home \ Away	ARD	CLI	COL	CRU	GLV	GLT	LIN	NEW	OMA	POR
Ards		2–1	1–2	0–0	0–0	0–4	2–4	1–4	1–3	1–4
Cliftonville	1–0		2–4	3–0	1–0	0–4	1–2	2–2	0–2	1–1
Coleraine	1–2	0–0		1–0	2–1	2–0	1–0	1–0	2–1	2–4
Crusaders	3–0	0–2	0–2		3–4	0–2	0–2	1–1	1–2	0–1
Glenavon	0–1	1–3	1–0	0–2		0–0	0–2	0–0	5–1	1–4
Glentoran	4–0	2–0	1–0	1–0	1–0		1–0	3–0	4–1	2–2
Linfield	4–0	2–2	3–1	4–0	1–3	0–0		1–1	0–1	0–1
Newry Town	0–1	1–0	3–1	2–2	1–1	0–1	0–2		1–1	2–2
Omagh Town	1–0	0–0	2–2	2–2	1–1	2–2	1–0	4–2		3–0
Portadown	2–1	3–1	3–4	4–1	4–0	0–1	1–2	4–0	2–0	

Source: Irish League Archive
Legend: Blue = home team win; Yellow = draw; Red = away team win.

==== Matches 19–36 ====
Home \ Away	ARD	CLI	COL	CRU	GLV	GLT	LIN	NEW	OMA	POR
Ards		0–2	1–4	2–1	1–2	0–0	2–2	4–2	0–2	0–2
Cliftonville	0–0		2–3	1–1	0–1	1–2	3–1	0–2	1–0	0–0
Coleraine	5–0	3–2		1–2	4–0	1–0	0–2	1–2	2–1	1–3
Crusaders	1–1	1–3	2–1		2–0	0–1	1–3	4–3	7–2	1–2
Glenavon	0–1	2–1	1–2	0–1		1–1	2–0	0–1	3–4	2–3
Glentoran	1–1	0–0	2–1	6–0	5–1		3–3	2–2	2–0	1–0
Linfield	2–1	2–0	7–1	0–0	0–0	2–2		4–0	3–2	1–1
Newry Town	1–1	1–0	1–4	0–1	1–1	0–1	0–2		0–1	1–1
Omagh Town	1–1	1–1	3–2	3–0	2–0	2–1	1–1	0–1		1–2
Portadown	3–1	0–0	3–0	3–1	0–0	1–0	0–0	6–1	3–1	

Source: Irish League Archive
Legend: Blue = home team win; Yellow = draw; Red = away team win.

== First Division ==
Irish League First Division
- Champions: Lisburn Distillery
- Promoted: Lisburn Distillery; Institute
- Matches played: 180
- Goals scored: 509 (2.83 per match)

Location of teams in the 2001–02 Irish League First Division

=== League standings ===
Pos	Team	Pld	W	D	L	GF	GA	GD	Pts	Promotion
1	Lisburn Distillery (C, P)	36	24	4	8	64	26	+38	76	Promotion to the Premier Division
2	Institute (P)	36	22	8	6	76	35	+41	74	Promotion to the Premier Division
3	Dungannon Swifts	36	17	8	11	55	42	+13	59	
4	Larne	36	14	11	11	52	42	+10	53	
5	Ballymena United	36	14	11	11	59	56	+3	53	
6	Bangor	36	10	12	14	40	45	−5	42	
7	Limavady United	36	10	7	19	49	68	−19	37	
8	Carrick Rangers	36	9	9	18	34	55	−21	36	
9	Ballyclare Comrades	36	7	12	17	40	73	−33	33	
10	Armagh City	36	8	8	20	40	67	−27	32	

Source: rsssf.com
(C) Champions; (P) Promoted
