= 2003–04 Irish First Division =

Irish First Division
- Champions: Loughgall
- Promoted: Loughgall
- Relegated: Lurgan Celtic; Brantwood
- Matches played: 132
- Goals scored: 342 (2.59 per match)

Location of teams in the 2003–04 Irish First Division
Location of the Belfast-based teams in the 2003–04 Irish First Division

The 2003–04 Irish First Division was the ninth season of second-tier football in Northern Ireland under the league system at the time. The division consisted of 12 clubs.

Loughgall were the champions and were promoted to the 2004–05 Irish Premier League. Armagh City finished second and entered the promotion play-off, losing to Cliftonville 4–1 on aggregate. Lurgan Celtic and Brantwood were relegated to the Irish Second Division.

== League table ==
Pos	Team	Pld	W	D	L	GF	GA	GD	Pts	Promotion or relegation
1	Loughgall (C, P)	22	14	6	2	37	20	+17	48	Promotion to Irish Premier League
2	Armagh City	22	13	4	5	30	15	+15	43	Qualification to promotion play-off
3	Ballyclare Comrades	22	13	4	5	34	21	+13	43	
4	Bangor	22	11	6	5	35	20	+15	39	
5	Harland & Wolff Welders	22	9	6	7	29	24	+5	33	
6	Ballymoney United	22	7	8	7	22	26	−4	29	
7	Carrick Rangers	22	6	7	9	30	35	−5	25	
8	Donegal Celtic	22	5	8	9	29	27	+2	23	
9	Ballinamallard United	22	5	6	11	20	31	−11	21	
10	Moyola Park	22	4	6	12	34	41	−7	18	
11	Lurgan Celtic (R)	22	3	9	10	24	44	−20	18	Relegation to Irish Second Division
12	Brantwood (R)	22	4	6	12	18	38	−20	18	Relegation to Irish Second Division

Rules for classification: 1st points; 2nd goal difference; 3rd goals scored; 4th head-to-head points; 5th head-to-head goal difference
(C) Champions; (P) Promoted; (R) Relegated
