= Derek Duncan =

English footballer (born 1987)

Personal information
- Full name: Derek Henry Junior Duncan
- Date of birth: 23 April 1987 (age 39)
- Place of birth: Upton Park, England
- Height: 5 ft 9 in (1.75 m)
- Position: Winger

Youth career
- 2002–2004: Leyton Orient

Senior career*
Years	Team	Apps	(Gls)
2004–2007	Leyton Orient	19	(0)
2006	→ Lewes (loan)	5	(0)
2007	Grays Athletic	0	(0)
2007–2009	Wycombe Wanderers	0	(0)
2007–2008	→ Lewes (loan)	5	(0)
2009	Ebbsfleet United	8	(0)
2009–2010	AFC Wimbledon	22	(1)
2010–2011	Ebbsfleet United	32	(2)
2011–2012	Woking	25	(0)
2012–2013	Maidenhead United	19	(0)
- Thamesmead Town
2016–2017	VCD Athletic		
- * Club domestic league appearances and goals as of 17:39, 2 January 2017 (UTC)

Derek Henry Junior Duncan (born 23 April 1987) is an English footballer who plays as a winger or as a left back for VCD Athletic.

== Career ==
Duncan was signed by Grays Athletic on a one-year contract on 25 May 2007, following his release by Leyton Orient. The left-winger left Grays Athletic by mutual consent, just a month after he signed, after his agent offered him to other Football League clubs.

Duncan was signed by Paul Lambert in the summer of 2007 and joined Wycombe Wanderers, where he failed to make a league appearance before having his contract terminated by mutual consent in January 2009.

On the same day it was announced that he had left Wycombe Wanderers, it was announced that the winger had signed for Ebbsfleet United until the end of the 2008–09 season. The following day Duncan made his debut for Ebbsfleet in their 1–0 home league win over Rushden & Diamonds.

Duncan signed for AFC Wimbledon on 15 June 2009, but after one season at Kingsmeadow he signed for former club Ebbsfleet, on 6 July 2010.

On 29 July 2011, it was announced he had signed for Conference South side Woking.

At the start of 2012–13 season he signed for Conference South side Maidenhead United.

Isthmian League side VCD Athletic recruited Duncan for the 2016–17 season. He featured throughout the first part of the season, before picking up a straight-red card sending off on 1 January 2017 versus local rivals Phoenix Sports.
