= Marc Newsham =

English footballer

Personal information
- Full name: Marc Anthony Newsham
- Date of birth: 24 March 1987 (age 39)
- Place of birth: Doncaster, England
- Position: Striker

Team information
- Current team: Club Thorne Colliery FC

Senior career*
Years	Team	Apps	(Gls)
2005–2009	Rotherham United	48	(7)
2005	→ Sheffield (loan)	0	(0)
2008–2009	→ Gainsborough Trinity (loan)	?	(?)
2009	→ Ilkeston Town (loan)	?	(?)
2009–2015	Boston United	209	(110)
2015–2016	Gainsborough Trinity	20	(9)
2016–2018	Matlock Town		
2018–2024	Sheffield	129	(41)
Medal record
Representing Great Britain
football
Universiade
Silver medal – second place	2013 Kazan	Football
- * Club domestic league appearances and goals as of 13:26, 1 June 2024 (UTC) Club Thorne 2025

Marc Anthony Newsham (born 24 March 1987) is an English former footballer who played as a striker.

He notably played in the Football League for Rotherham United, but has since played in Non-League football for Gainsborough Trinity, Ilkeston Town, Boston United, Matlock Town and most notably Sheffield.

== Career ==
Newsham is a product of the Rotherham United youth team and made his first team debut in March 2005. He scored his first goal for the club against Accrington Stanley in the Football League Trophy in October 2005 to take the tie to penalties. Following the 2007–08 season, he signed a new one-year contract with Rotherham in May 2008.

Newsham signed on a month's loan for Gainsborough Trinity in November 2008, but failed to make an impact in the first team, mainly due to the signing of Luke Beckett. He also spent time on loan with Ilkeston Town helping the club earn a play-off spot in the Northern Premier Division. Newsham was released by Rotherham on his return and signed for Boston United in June 2009. From joining Boston in 2009, Newsham scored over 100 goals for the Lincolnshire club.

On 11 June 2015, Newsham left Boston United to join local rivals Gainsborough Trinity on a permanent deal. The transfer gained some attention after it was noted that the scarf Newsham was holding in his signing picture had misspelled the club's name. He scored his first competitive goal for Trinity against the Pilgrims in an FA Cup 2nd Qualifying Round tie.

He joined Matlock Town in May 2016.

Following the conclusion of the 2023–24 season, Newsham announced his retirement from football. He finished his career as Sheffield's tenth all-time highest goalscorer with 81 goals in 184 appearances.
