= 2003–04 Irish Premier League =

Irish Premier League
- Season: 2003–04
- Champions: Linfield; 45th Irish title
- Relegated: Glenavon
- UEFA Champions League: Linfield
- UEFA Cup: Portadown; Glentoran
- UEFA Intertoto Cup: Ballymena United
- Matches played: 240
- Top goalscorer: Glenn Ferguson (25 goals)

Location of teams in the 2003–04 Irish Premier League
Location of the Belfast-based teams in the 2003–04 Irish Premier League

The 2003–04 Irish Premier League was the 103rd edition of the Irish League, the highest level of league competition in Northern Irish football. For this season there was a change from the structure of previous seasons, with the First Division reverting to intermediate status and the new Premier Division being renamed as the Irish Premier League. The league consisted of 16 teams, and Linfield won the championship.

== League standings ==
Pos	Team	Pld	W	D	L	GF	GA	GD	Pts	Qualification or relegation
1	Linfield (C)	30	22	7	1	67	16	+51	73	Qualification to Champions League first qualifying round
2	Portadown	30	22	4	4	71	22	+49	70	Qualification to UEFA Cup first qualifying round
3	Lisburn Distillery	30	16	7	7	45	30	+15	55	
4	Coleraine	30	14	9	7	48	36	+12	51	
5	Glentoran	30	15	5	10	48	27	+21	50	Qualification to UEFA Cup first qualifying round (Note: As Irish Cup winners)
6	Ballymena United	30	13	8	9	41	35	+6	47	Qualification to Intertoto Cup first round
7	Limavady United	30	12	5	13	41	44	−3	41	
8	Ards	30	9	11	10	36	46	−10	38	
9	Crusaders	30	10	6	14	33	38	−5	36	
10	Dungannon Swifts	30	10	6	14	36	48	−12	36	
11	Institute	30	9	7	14	38	53	−15	34	
12	Newry Town	30	8	9	13	35	53	−18	33	
13	Omagh Town	30	9	4	17	37	58	−21	31	
14	Larne	30	7	8	15	42	51	−9	29	
15	Cliftonville	30	6	8	16	27	45	−18	26	Qualification to Promotion/relegation play-off
16	Glenavon (R)	30	4	4	22	24	67	−43	16	Relegation to Irish First Division

Source: rsssf.com
Rules for classification: 1st points; 2nd goal difference; 3rd number of goals scored; 4th head-to-head points; 5th head-to-head goal difference
(C) Champions; (R) Relegated

== Results ==
Each team played every other team twice (home and away) for a total of 30 games.

Home \ Away	ARD	BYM	CLI	COL	CRU	DUN	GLV	GLT	INS	LRN	LIM	LIN	LIS	NEW	OMA	POR
Ards		1–1	0–0	2–2	2–0	0–2	2–4	2–1	2–2	1–1	0–0	0–4	1–1	4–0	2–1	2–1
Ballymena United	1–0		0–1	3–1	1–1	1–0	4–0	0–0	2–1	1–1	0–3	0–0	1–4	4–0	3–1	1–4
Cliftonville	2–1	0–3		2–0	0–1	1–0	0–1	1–1	1–2	0–0	3–2	1–4	0–0	1–2	1–2	0–1
Coleraine	4–1	4–0	1–0		0–1	3–1	2–1	0–1	4–2	0–4	2–1	2–0	0–0	4–3	0–0	3–1
Crusaders	0–0	0–0	0–0	0–1		0–1	0–4	0–1	3–1	3–2	2–0	1–3	0–1	2–2	4–1	1–2
Dungannon Swifts	2–2	0–0	2–2	3–2	2–1		3–1	1–4	1–1	2–5	1–2	0–4	2–0	3–0	1–0	1–2
Glenavon	1–2	0–3	1–1	0–0	2–1	2–2		1–2	0–2	0–4	2–3	0–2	2–2	0–2	0–3	0–3
Glentoran	3–0	3–1	1–1	0–1	0–1 (Note: The first three games of the season by Glentoran were subsequently rated 0–1 for the respective opponents. Glentoran had used an ineligible player.)	1–0	4–0		1–0	1–0	2–1	1–3	0–1	4–0	4–0	1–2
Institute	0–1	0–4	2–1	2–2	1–3	1–0	1–0	3–1		4–1	0–4	0–0	0–2	1–1	1–1	0–3
Larne	5–1	1–2	2–1	0–2	0–0	0–2	1–0	1–4	2–4		2–1	0–3	0–2	3–3	1–2	2–4
Limavady United	0–1	0–1	3–1	3–3	2–3	3–1	2–0	1–0	2–1	0–0		0–2	0–3	1–0	3–2	0–6
Linfield	2–2	4–1	1–0	0–0	1–0	2–0	3–1	2–1	6–0	1–0	3–2		3–0	5–0	2–0	0–0
Lisburn Distillery	1–0	2–1	2–1	1–1	2–1	2–0	5–0	1–1	3–2	1–0	0–1	1–1		3–2	1–2	1–0
Newry Town	0–0	1–1	3–1	0–1	2–1	0–0	4–0	0–0	2–1	3–3	1–1	1–2	1–0		1–0	1–2
Omagh Town	1–4	2–0	2–3	1–1	0–3	1–3	2–1	1–4	0–3	0–0	2–0	1–3	3–2	3–0		2–5
Portadown	4–0	0–1	5–1	2–1	4–0	5–0	2–0	2–1	0–0	3–1	0–0	1–1	4–1	2–0	1–0	

Source: Irish League Archive
Legend: Blue = home team win; Yellow = draw; Red = away team win.

== Promotion/relegation play-off ==
Cliftonville, the club that finished in the relegation play-off place, faced Armagh City, the runners-up of the 2003–04 Irish First Division in a two-legged tie for a place in next season's Irish Premier League.

4 May 2004

Armagh City	0 – 3	Cliftonville

Holm Park, Armagh

7 May 2004

Cliftonville	1 – 1	Armagh City

Solitude, Belfast

Cliftonville won 4–1 on aggregate
