= 2018–19 Aberdeen F.C. season =

Aberdeen
2018–19 season
- Chairman: Stewart Milne
- Manager: Derek McInnes
- Ground: Pittodrie Stadium
- Scottish Premiership: 4th
- Scottish League Cup: Runners-up
- Scottish Cup: Semi-final
- Europa League: Second qualifying round
- Top goalscorer: League: Sam Cosgrove (17); All: Sam Cosgrove (21)
- Highest home attendance: League: 20,027 vs Celtic; 26 December 2018; Cup: 20,313 vs Burnley; Europa League; 26 July 2018
- Lowest home attendance: League: 12,252 vs Livingston; 11 December 2018; Cup: 7,857 vs Queen of the South; Scottish Cup; 10 February 2019
- Average home league attendance: 14,924
Home colours	Away colours

The 2018–19 Aberdeen F.C. season was Aberdeen's 106th season in the top flight of Scottish football. Aberdeen also competed in the League Cup and the Scottish Cup.

Aberdeen also competed in qualifying for the 2018–19 UEFA Europa League.

== Summary ==
=== May ===
On 14 May, Scott McKenna & Graeme Shinnie were called up to the national team. On 28 May, Gothenburg Great Neale Cooper died at the age of 54. On 29 May, Graeme Shinnie made his full Scotland debut, coming on as a substitute in a 2–0 defeat to Peru.

=== June ===
On 1 June, Lewis Ferguson officially joined the club, although the compensation fee still had to be sorted between the Dons and Hamilton Academical. On 2 June, Scott McKenna, in his fourth game for Scotland, was made team captain in a 1–0 defeat to Mexico. Graeme Shinnie also earned his first start for Scotland.

On 5 June, Chris Forrester joined the club from Peterborough United for a fee believed to be in the region of £150,000. On 12 June, the club announced that their Pre-season training camp would be taking place in Ireland and the club would play a friendly against Cobh Ramblers. On 14 June, defender Anthony O'Connor joined Bradford City on a three-year deal. After his release from Ipswich Town, Irish International Stephen Gleeson signed on a two-year deal.

On 15 June, the season league fixtures were announced by the SPFL, with the Dons starting at home to Rangers, with the game being live on TV on 5 August at 1pm. On the same day, the Dons announced a pre-season friendly at home to English Championship club West Bromwich Albion. On 20 June, the Europa League Second Qualifying Round draw was made and the Dons were drawn against English Premier League club Burnley. It was the first time the Dons played English opposition in Europe since Ipswich Town in 1981.

On 25 June, Executive Vice-Chairman George Yule announced that he would be leaving his role following major surgery, said to be "a prostate cancer scare" but he explained he was "heading towards full recovery". On 26 June, Scotland Under-21 International Daniel Harvie, who was released last season as he wanted regular football, signed for Ayr United.

=== July ===
On 3 July, the start of the construction phase began on the New Aberdeen Stadium. On 8 July, after the 2–2 draw against St Johnstone, the Dons took the decision to cancel the friendly on 11 July with Inverness Caledonian Thistle due to "a number of fitness concerns within the first team squad".

On 11 July, goalkeeper Danny Rogers joined St Mirren on a season long loan deal. On the same day, former Hearts defender Krystian Nowak joined on trial. After being on loan last season, Dominic Ball rejoined the club again for a second season-long loan spell.

On 15 July, the friendly match between the Dons and Cove Rangers was abandoned after 50 minutes due to a severe head injury to Cove Rangers player Jordon Brown. After sustaining an injury in the match, the Dons announced defender Mark Reynolds was ruled out until the end of the year having to undergo knee surgery.

On 19 July, striker Adam Rooney left for newly promoted National League side Salford City for a reported fee of £375,000. He scored 88 goals in 197 appearances for the club. The transfer led to Accrington Stanley owner Andy Holt accusing Salford, and most notably Gary Neville, of "buying" a place in the English Football League, with Rooney reportedly due to earn £4,000 per week at Salford. Motherwell manager Stephen Robinson also accused Neville of "lacking etiquette" after discussing his club's transfer business and "blew them away with money" to get the deal done.

On 22 July, Austrian goalkeeper Sebastian Gessl joined on trial after leaving German side Karlsruher SC. On 25 July, the Dons signed both Goalkeeper Tomáš Černý, on a one-year deal after his release from Partick Thistle, and defender Tommie Hoban, on loan from Watford with the club having the option of recalling him in January 2019.

=== August ===
On 2 August, the Dons were knocked out of UEFA Europa League at the Second qualifying round stage against Burnley. Even though with defeat, the Dons were praised by Burnley fans by creating a great atmosphere at both matches.

After his actions after the match last season against Celtic, defender Shay Logan was suspended for the first 3 matches of the league season beginning on 5 August, against Rangers, Dundee and St Mirren. On 8 August, defender Scott McKenna was ruled out for 6 weeks with an injury picked up in the 1–1 draw with Rangers. On 13 August, striker James Wilson joined from Manchester United on a season-long loan deal.

After the 4–0 win in the League Cup against St Mirren, the Dons were drawn against Hibernian in the Quarter Finals, although at the time of the draw, it was not known whether it was Hibernian or Ross County. On 20 August, compensation was agreed after a tribunal for midfielder Lewis Ferguson after signing him from Hamilton Academical with the fee being kept private and although the Dons felt they had "received a fair hearing", Hamilton wanted "The guidelines used in making the decision should be made available".

On 22 August, the Dons rejected a £3.5m bid from Celtic for defender Scott McKenna, with manager Derek McInnes stating that McKenna would not be sold in the transfer window, and that another bid would be a waste of time. Aberdeen valued the centre-half at around £10m.

On 30 August, Max Lowe joined on loan from Derby County, initially until January 2019. On 31 August, Jordan McGregor joined after being released from Airdrieonians and impressing on trial. He joined with the Development Squad.

=== September ===
On Transfer deadline day, the Dons rejected a reported £7m bid from Aston Villa for defender Scott McKenna.

On 1 September, Mikey Devlin was sent off by referee Craig Thomson after only 5 minutes in a 2–0 home loss to Kilmarnock. The decision was appealed by the Dons but was rejected by the SFA with manager McInnes stating that he was "extremely disappointed with this outcome" and he later criticized the SFA for their "incompetency". On 4 September, Bruce Anderson signed a new deal until 2021.

After progressing through to the Semi-finals with a win against Hibernian (6–5 on penalties after a 0–0 draw after extra-time), the Dons were drawn to face Rangers. Alfredo Morelos and Kyle Lafferty were suspended for them. Oddly, the venue was not chosen until a later date due to clashes with Celtic and the Europa League, with Murrayfield Stadium being a likely option due to the demand for tickets. The following day, due to dismay expressed from the club and supporters, the match with Rangers was due to take place at noon at Hampden Park.

=== October ===
On 3 October, the League Cup semi final match with Rangers was changed to a 4:30pm kick off time after fans and clubs appeals.

On 4 October, the SPFL suspended Scott McKenna for two matches after his challenge on Odsonne Édouard in the match against Celtic. The Dons appealed however it was rejected. On 11 October, defender Scott McKenna came on a second-half substitute in a 2–1 defeat against Israel, marking his competitive debut for Scotland. Subsequently, following this match due to call-offs, Michael Devlin and Gary Mackay-Steven were called up for the friendly with Portugal.

Aberdeen reached the League Cup Final thanks to a late header from Lewis Ferguson against Rangers with manager McInnes claiming "he was born to play at Hampden."

=== November ===
On 6 November, Michael Devlin, Gary Mackay-Steven, Scott McKenna & Graeme Shinnie were all called up to the national team for the Nations League matches in Albania and at home to Israel. However Devlin was injured in training before the Albania match and subsequently missed the League Cup Final.

On 13 November, striker James Wilson was awarded Goal of the Month for October for his stunning strike against Hamilton Academical.

=== December ===
On 2 December, former Dons loanee Ryan Christie scored the only goal in a 1–0 win in the League Cup Final against the Dons. During the match, winger Gary Mackay-Steven suffered concussion in a challenge with Dedryck Boyata. He was down for 6 minutes and was taken to hospital then later released. Manager McInnes later said after the match, that he "intends to come back to another final with Aberdeen and I intend to win another trophy", with his only success with the club coming in the 2014 Final.

On 5 December, the Dons won against Rangers at Ibrox with Scott McKenna scoring the only goal and having to play for almost 60 minutes with 10 men after Sam Cosgrove was wrongfully dismissed. A few days after the match, Connor McLennan signed a new deal until 2021.

Although the Dons lost their next match to St Johnstone, after this they had back-to-back wins against newly-promoted clubs Livingston and St Mirren respectively, propelling the Dons to a season-high so far of fourth in the table. Sam Cosgrove's booking against Livingston for 'diving' was later rescinded. On 21 December, despite holding talks over an extended stay, Max Lowe returned to his parent club Derby County in January.

After the comfortable 2–0 win over Hearts, the two managers had a spat beginning with Craig Levein claiming after the match they should have had 2 penalties. McInnes responded saying they "moan about this and that" but "the best team won". Levein then claimed McInnes of "double standards" and him talking "tripe" and said he was "crying like a baby" in a phone conversation. McInnes then responded again after the 4–3 defeat to Celtic saying Levein was "irrational and childish".

The Dons completed the year with a win against Livingston, placing fourth in the table. It was also announced the club will have their winter training camp again in Dubai. Later subsequently whilst in Dubai, striker Sam Cosgrove was awarded player of the month for December and manager Derek McInnes was awarded manager of the month for December.

=== January ===
On 7 January, Sam Cosgrove signed a contract extension until 2022. On the same day, youth defender Sam Roscoe extended his loan deal with Alloa until the end of the season. On 8 January, Greg Tansey had his contract terminated with the club and later that day signed for St Mirren. There was some confusion as to whether Dean Campbell had scored against Livingston in the away win, so the SPFL awarded Campbell with the goal, his first for the club. The Dons concluded their winter training camp in Dubai with a 2–0 friendly win against Dibba Al Hisn, with Sam Cosgrove scoring both goals.

On 17 January, Max Lowe rejoined the Dons on loan from Derby County until the end of the season. On 18 January, after being on loan last season, Greg Stewart joined on loan until the end of the season from Birmingham City. The Dons returned to action in the Scottish Cup with a lackluster 1–1 draw against bottom of League One side Stenhousemuir, however they won the replay 4–1. On 22 January, summer signing Chris Forrester had his contract terminated by the club, sighting personal reasons. He returned to Ireland, his native homeland, to play for St Patrick's Athletic.

On transfer deadline day, Scott Wright joined Dundee, Bruce Anderson joined Dunfermline Athletic, and Mark Reynolds joined Dundee United all on loan respectively, until the end of the season. The Dons also rejected bids for defender Scott McKenna and winger Gary Mackay-Steven.

=== February ===
The Dons moved up to third in the table with a hard-fought 2–1 win at Easter Road against Hibernian, even with striker Sam Cosgrove and goalkeeper Joe Lewis going off with injuries. Both players, however, were fit to play in the next match in what was a pulsating 4–2 home defeat to Rangers, with Alfredo Morelos (who was later given a 3 match ban after an appeal) and Scott McKenna clashing with both men being sent off. It was the third time Morelos had been sent off against Aberdeen this season. Rangers goalkeeper Allan McGregor was also given a possible 2 match ban for 'kicking' Lewis Ferguson. McGregor was then given the 2 match ban.

Even after a stunning goal from Stephen Dobbie, Aberdeen seen off Queen of the South with a 4–1 win in the Scottish Cup at Pittodrie. They were drawn at home in the next round against the winner of either Kilmarnock or Rangers with the latter winning in the replay. In the next league match, the Dons drew 2–2 at home to St Mirren. During the match whilst broadcasting for BBC Scotland, Derek Ferguson (father of Lewis Ferguson) announced his son was set to sign a new deal with the club. He signed on until 2024. Defender Tommie Hoban was injured in the match and a few days later, he was ruled out until the end of the season through another knee injury. He returned to Watford for treatment.

Shortly after the 2–0 win away to St Johnstone, manager Derek McInnes announced that Shay Logan would be out with an ankle injury for up to three months. The club later that day announced the signing of experienced defender Greg Halford until the end of the season. Aberdeen ended the month with a home defeat to Hamilton Academical.

=== March ===
On 1 March, Aberdeen FC's plans for the new £50m stadium were given the legal go-ahead. The Dons Scottish Cup Quarter-final match with Rangers ended in a 1–1 draw but the match was marred with violence as 6 arrests were made and seats broken in the away section. The replay took place on 12 March. The Dons had a league match in between the Rangers matches, a 0–0 draw at Celtic Park. It was the first 0–0 between the sides since 1994.

On 12 March, Scott McKenna & Graeme Shinnie were called up to the national team. Niall McGinn was called up for Northern Ireland. On the same day, the Dons won their Scottish Cup replay with Rangers 2–0 at Ibrox. They will play Celtic on 14 April in the Semi-final at Hampden Park with a 2:00pm kick off. Graeme Shinnie will be suspended for the match after picking up 2 yellows in the matches against Rangers. The Dons League home woes continued after they were held to a 1–1 draw with Livingston. The Dons ended March with their unbeaten away run coming to an end against Hearts at Tynecastle Stadium. Tom Crotty who has invested in the club became a director.

=== April ===
Aberdeen began April by winning their first home League match of 2019 with a 3–1 win against Motherwell. The club announced that defender Mark Reynolds had agreed to join Dundee United permanently, having initially joined them on loan in January.

The Dons ended the pre-split fixtures with a 2–0 win against Dundee at Dens Park, with Sam Cosgrove scoring both goals taking his season tally up to 20. The post-split fixtures were announced with the Dons away to Kilmarnock and Rangers, then home matches against Celtic and Hearts, and finishing the season at Easter Road against Hibernian.

Scott McKenna was named captain for the Scottish Cup semi-final match against Celtic as normal captain Graeme Shinnie was suspended. Shinnie, out of contract at the end of the season, was in talks with Derby County. Aberdeen lost the match 3–0 exiting the competition, finishing the match with 9 men and with both manager and assistant being sent to the stands. Dominic Ball was given a second yellow after a head challenge with Ryan Christie which left the former with a black-eye and multiple cheek fractures. Lewis Ferguson was given a straight red for a tackle on Tom Rogic. Assistant head coach Tony Docherty was sent to the stand at half time and during the second half, manager Derek McInnes was also sent to the stand for appearing to hurl abuse at the Celtic fans, after they had allegedly sung a sectarian song about him. Police Scotland looked into the incident but found no clear evidence and both were later charged by the SFA. After the match, it was revealed Niall McGinn was out until the end of the season with an ankle injury.

Their next league match seen them win at Kilmarnock, with the home side having three players sent off, although one was later rescinded. Steve Clarke ranted at referee Steven McLean saying that "he should never referee Killie games again." He was later charged for his comments.

On 26 April before the Dons next match against Rangers their manager Steven Gerrard claimed Aberdeen only raise their games against them, with McInnes dismissing these comments. Defender Andrew Considine also signed a two-year contract extension with the option of a further year. Aberdeen lost the match 2–0 with Rangers scoring two penalties, one of which Considine was sent off for conceding.

=== May ===
On 4 May, Aberdeen lost 3–0 at home to Celtic, handing their opponents an eighth league title in a row. Captain Graeme Shinnie announced he signed a three-year deal on a pre-contract for Derby County. He was also named in the Premier League Team of the Year, whilst Lewis Ferguson was nominated for Young Player of the Year. On 10 May, the Dons won their final home game of the season with a 2–1 win against Hearts. A few days after the match, back-up Goalkeeper Tomáš Černý signed a new one-year deal.

On 16 May, the Aberdeen player awards took place. Ethan Ross was named Development Player of the Year, Lewis Ferguson was named Young Player of the Year and scored the Goal of the Season, Max Lowe was named Players’ Player of the Year, and Joe Lewis was named AFC Player of the Year. The next day, Ethan Ross signed a new two-year contract.

On the final day of the League season, the Dons came from behind to win 2–1 at Easter Road against Hibernian, however because Kilmarnock beat Rangers by the same scoreline, they finished the season in Fourth place. Aberdeen received the final European place after Celtic won the Scottish Cup Final against Hearts. In the close season, Frank Ross signed a new one-year deal with the option of a further year.

== Results and fixtures ==
Win Draw Loss Postponed

=== Pre-season ===
30 June 2018 Friendly	Cobh Ramblers	0–1	Aberdeen	Fota Island Resort, Cork, Ireland
14:00 BST		AFC Report	Forrester 62'	Attendance: 250

4 July 2018 Friendly	Aberdeen	1–0	Falkirk	Gayfield Park, Arbroath
19:30 BST	Ferguson 87'	AFC Report		Attendance: 922; Referee: Nick Walsh

8 July 2018 Friendly	St Johnstone	2–2	Aberdeen	McDiarmid Park
14:00 BST	Wotherspoon 5'; Hurst 73'	AFC Report	May 8'; Wright 28'	Attendance: 1,554; Referee: Alan Muir

15 July 2018 Friendly	Cove Rangers	A – A (Note: Abandoned after a severe injury to Cove Rangers player Jordon Brown. Score 2–1 to Aberdeen at abandonment)	Aberdeen	Balmoral Stadium
13:00 BST	Megginson 27' (pen.)	AFC Report	Logan 21'; Forrester 45'	Attendance: 1,250; Referee: Alex Shepherd

20 July 2018 Friendly	Aberdeen	1–1	West Bromwich Albion	Pittodrie Stadium
20:00 BST	Cosgrove 37'	AFC Report; WBA Report	Livermore 43'	Attendance: 6,257; Referee: Willie Collum

23 July 2018 Friendly	Inverurie Locos	2–3	Aberdeen XI	Harlaw Park
19:30 BST	Gauld 52'; Souter 90'	AFC Report	Brown 4'; Anderson 20'; Dangana 37'

29 July 2018 Friendly	Arbroath	0–3	Aberdeen XI	Gayfield Park
14:00 BST		AFC Report	Anderson 20' (pen.), 34', 48'	Attendance: 443; Referee: Alan Newlands

=== Scottish Premiership ===
5 August 2018 1	Aberdeen	1–1	Rangers	Pittodrie Stadium
13:00 BST	Ferguson (yellow card) 65'; Devlin (yellow card) 74'; Forrester (yellow card) 88'; Anderson 90+3'	Report	Morelos (red card) 12'; Tavernier 30' (pen.); Arfield (yellow card) 74'; Goldson (yellow card) 79'	Attendance: 19,046; Referee: Kevin Clancy

11 August 2018 2	Dundee	0–1	Aberdeen	Dens Park
15:00 BST	Kusunga (yellow card) 74'	Report	Ferguson (yellow card) 24'; Devlin (yellow card) 33'; Gleeson (yellow card) 50'; Mackay-Steven 75' (pen.)	Attendance: 7,581; Referee: Bobby Madden

25 August 2018 3	Hibernian	1–1	Aberdeen	Easter Road
15:00 BST	Hanlon (yellow card) 36'; Stevenson (yellow card) 52'; Maclaren 85'; Mallan (yellow card) 89'; Porteous (yellow card) 90+5'	Report	Hoban 45' (yellow card) 46'; Shinnie (yellow card) 68'; Considine (yellow card) 90'; Logan (yellow card) 90'; Mackay-Steven (yellow card) 90+5'	Attendance: 18,583; Referee: Andrew Dallas

1 September 2018 4	Aberdeen	0–2	Kilmarnock	Pittodrie Stadium
15:00 BST	Devlin (red card) 5'; Ferguson (yellow card) 54'; Shinnie (yellow card) 83'; Logan (yellow card) 87'	Report	Power (yellow card) 22'; Tshibola (yellow card) 30'; Brophy 44' (yellow card) 56'; Stewart 69'	Attendance: 14,248; Referee: Craig Thomson

15 September 2018 5	St Johnstone	1–1	Aberdeen	McDiarmid Park
15:00 BST	McMillan 13'; Craig (yellow card) 18'; Alston (yellow card) 66'; Swanson (yellow card) 89'	Report	Considine (yellow card) 47'; McGinn 69'; Lowe (yellow card) 70'	Attendance: 4,880; Referee: Willie Collum

22 September 2018 6	Aberdeen	1–0	Motherwell	Pittodrie Stadium
15:00 BST	Wilson 6'; McKenna (yellow card) 76'; Considine (yellow card) 89'; Ball (yellow card) 90+2'	Report	Aldred (yellow card) 44'; Bigirimana (yellow card) 77'; Frear (yellow card) 86'	Attendance: 14,027; Referee: Nick Walsh

29 September 2018 7	Celtic	1–0	Aberdeen	Celtic Park
15:00 BST	Sinclair 63'	Report		Attendance: 59,143; Referee: Bobby Madden

6 October 2018 8	Aberdeen	4–1	St Mirren	Pittodrie Stadium
15:00 BST	Cosgrove 26', 65'; McLennan 30'; Lowe 41'	Report	Flynn (yellow card) 23'; McGinn (yellow card) 45'; Jackson 76'	Attendance: 14,003; Referee: Alan Muir

20 October 2018 9	Hearts	2–1	Aberdeen	Tynecastle Stadium
15:00 BST	Djoum (yellow card) 19' (goal) 36'; Godinho (yellow card) 29'; Naismith 43' (pen.) (yellow card) 71'; Morrison (yellow card) 57'; Clare (yellow card) 89'	Report	Ball (yellow card) 10'; Mackay-Steven (yellow card) 20' (goal) 55' (pen.); Considine (yellow card) 36'; Devlin (yellow card) 42'; Ferguson (yellow card) 68'; Logan (yellow card) 78'	Attendance: 18,051; Referee: Kevin Clancy

31 October 2018 11	Aberdeen	3–0	Hamilton Academical	Pittodrie Stadium
19:45 GMT	Shinnie 8'; Wilson 23'; Devlin 60'	Report	Imrie (yellow card) 78' (yellow-red card) 90+2'	Attendance: 12,365; Referee: Greg Aitken

4 November 2018 12	Kilmarnock	1–2	Aberdeen	Rugby Park
12:15 GMT	K. Boyd 32' (pen.); Taylor (yellow card) 35'; Broadfoot (yellow card) 87'		Logan (yellow card) 40'; Anderson 73'; Ferguson 87'	Attendance: 5,270; Referee: Bobby Madden

9 November 2018 13	Aberdeen	1–0	Hibernian	Pittodrie Stadium
19:45 GMT	Mackay-Steven 40'	Report	Porteous (yellow card) 16'; Mallan (yellow card) 60'; Milligan (yellow card) 90'	Attendance: 15,629; Referee: Alan Muir (Note: The referee was initially Willie Collum but after he picking up a groin injury at a previous match, he was replaced with fourth official Alan Muir.)

24 November 2018 14	Motherwell	3–0	Aberdeen	Fir Park
15:00 GMT	Johnson 25', 30'; Turnbull 54'; Campbell (yellow card) 84'	Report	Ferguson (yellow card) 87'	Attendance: 5,131; Referee: John Beaton

5 December 2018 16	Rangers	0–1	Aberdeen	Ibrox Stadium
19:45 GMT	Morelos (yellow card) 45+2' (yellow-red card) 64'; Lafferty (yellow card) 49'; McGregor (yellow card) 89'		McKenna 7'; Cosgrove (yellow card) 11' (yellow-red card) 34'; Shinnie (yellow card) 53'	Attendance: 49,711; Referee: Steven McLean

8 December 2018 17	Aberdeen	0–2	St Johnstone	Pittodrie Stadium
15:00 GMT	Shinnie (yellow card) 30'	Report	Craig (yellow card) 36'; Tanser (yellow card) 56'; Shaughnessy 71'; Alston 74'; Davidson (yellow card) 77'	Attendance: 13,304; Referee: Don Robertson

11 December 2018 10 (Note: Rearranged match after postponement)	Aberdeen	3–2	Livingston	Pittodrie Stadium
19:45 GMT	McGinn 9'; Cosgrove 57' (yellow card) 63' (Note: Booking was later rescinded); Ferguson 90+2'	Report	Halkett (yellow card) 6'; Pittman 12'; McMillan 32' (yellow card) 56'	Attendance: 12,252; Referee: Craig Thomson

15 December 2018 18	St Mirren	1–2	Aberdeen	The Simple Digital Arena
15:00 GMT	Jones (yellow card) 30'; MacPherson 35'; Edwards (yellow card) 37'; Hodson (yellow card) 60'; Hammill (yellow card) 78'	Report	May 30' (pen.); Ferguson (yellow card) 37'; Lowe (yellow card) 59'; Cosgrove 61'	Attendance: 4,699; Referee: Greg Aitken

18 December 2018 15	Aberdeen	5–1	Dundee	Pittodrie Stadium
19:45 GMT	Cosgrove 16', 44'; Considine 50'; McLennan 56'; O'Dea 73' (o.g.); Ferguson (yellow card) 75'	Report	Woods (yellow card) 56'; Ralph (yellow card) 66'; C Miller 68'; McGowan (yellow card) 77'	Attendance: 13,142; Referee: Nick Walsh

22 December 2018 19	Aberdeen	2–0	Hearts	Pittodrie Stadium
15:00 GMT	Cosgrove 2', 69' (pen.); Logan (yellow card) 63'; Gleeson (yellow card) 71'	Report	Mitchell (yellow card) 65' (yellow-red card) 86'; Haring (yellow card) 66'; Naismith (yellow card) 71'	Attendance: 16,451; Referee: John Beaton

26 December 2018 20	Aberdeen	3–4	Celtic	Pittodrie Stadium
14:00 GMT	May 24' (pen.) (yellow card) 52'; McGinn (yellow card) 38'; Cosgrove 83' (pen.) (yellow card) 90'; Ferguson 90'	Report	Sinclair 6', 76', 88' (yellow card) 90+2'; Édouard 86'	Attendance: 20,027; Referee: Willie Collum

29 December 2018 21	Livingston	1–2	Aberdeen	Toni Macaroni Arena
15:00 GMT	Hardie 89'	Report	Wilson 71'; Campbell 85'	Attendance: 5,548; Referee: Steven McLean

23 January 2019 22	Hamilton Academical	0–3	Aberdeen	Hope CBD Stadium
19:45 GMT	McGowan (yellow card) 16'; Gordon (yellow card) 28'; Martin (yellow card) 82'	Report	Cosgrove 25', 52'; Logan (yellow card) 51'; Ferguson 56' (yellow card) 78'	Attendance: 2,104; Referee: Greg Aitken

26 January 2019 23	Aberdeen	0–0	Kilmarnock	Pittodrie Stadium
15:00 GMT	Shinnie (yellow card) 29'; Ferguson (yellow card) 45'	Report	Dicker (yellow card) 73'; Tshibola (yellow card) 73'; S. Boyd (yellow card) 75'; Power (yellow card) 77'; K. Boyd (red card) 82'	Attendance: 15,560; Referee: Nick Walsh

2 February 2019 24	Hibernian	1–2	Aberdeen	Easter Road
15:00 GMT	Shaw 9'; Hanlon (yellow card) 10'; Kamberi (yellow card) 62'; Stevenson (yellow card) 83'	Report	Considine 12' (yellow card) 41'; Mackay-Steven 22'; Hoban (yellow card) 73'	Attendance: 16,269; Referee: Don Robertson

6 February 2019 25	Aberdeen	2–4	Rangers	Pittodrie Stadium
19:45 GMT	Cosgrove 31', 47' (pen.); Logan (yellow card) 36'; McKenna (red card) 55'; Ferguson (yellow card) 78'	Report	Morelos 20', 38', (red card) 57'; Tavernier 43' (pen.); Candeias (yellow card) 70'; Arfield (yellow card) 72'; Defoe 90+4'	Attendance: 19,190; Referee: Bobby Madden
Note: Game televised on Sky Sports football

16 February 2019 26	Aberdeen	2–2	St Mirren	Pittodrie Stadium
15:00 GMT	Ferguson 32'; Cosgrove 77'	Report	Lyons (yellow card) 16'; Nazon 20' (pen.) (yellow card) 23'; McAllister 61'	Attendance: 14,701; Referee: Craig Thomson

23 February 2019 27	St Johnstone	0–2	Aberdeen	McDiarmid Park
15:00 GMT	Kane (yellow card) 32'; Kerr (yellow card) 71'; Foster (yellow card) 79'	Report	Shinnie 16', 75' (yellow card) 67'	Attendance: 5,092; Referee: Euan Anderson

27 February 2019 28	Aberdeen	0–2	Hamilton Academical	Pittodrie Stadium
19:45 GMT	Considine (yellow card) 14'	Report	Oakley 34'; Miller 59' (yellow card) 90+4'; McGowan (yellow card) 63'	Attendance: 12,468; Referee: Bobby Madden

9 March 2019 29	Celtic	0–0	Aberdeen	Celtic Park
15:00 GMT	Boyata (yellow card) 41'	Report	Stewart (yellow card) 75'	Attendance: 59,123; Referee: Craig Thomson

16 March 2019 30	Aberdeen	1–1	Livingston	Pittodrie Stadium
15:00 GMT	McGinn 30'	Report	Sibbald 43'	Attendance: 14,366; Referee: Don Robertson

30 March 2019 31	Hearts	2–1	Aberdeen	Tynecastle Stadium
15:00 GMT	Clare 59' (Penalty); Ikpeazu 77'	Report	McLennan 16'	Attendance: 17,880; Referee: John Beaton

3 April 2019 32	Aberdeen	3–1	Motherwell	Pittodrie Stadium
19:45 BST	Lowe 4'; Ball (yellow card) 54'; McGinn 71', 90+7'	Report	Hastie 36'; McHugh (yellow card) 43'	Attendance: 13,228; Referee: Gavin Duncan

6 April 2019 33	Dundee	0–2	Aberdeen	Dens Park
15:00 BST		Report	Cosgrove 59' (pen.), 77'	Attendance: 6,593; Referee: Andrew Dallas

20 April 2019 34	Kilmarnock	0–1	Aberdeen	Rugby Park
15:00 BST	Broadfoot (red card) 36'; Findlay (yellow card) 35' (yellow-red card) 84'; Taylor (yellow card) 48'; Boyd (yellow card) 78'; McKenzie (red card) 90+4'	Report	Devlin (yellow card) 8'; Cosgrove (yellow card) 33'; McKenna (yellow card) 48' (goal) 66'; Shinnie (yellow card) 76'	Attendance: 6,531; Referee: Steven McLean

28 April 2019 35	Rangers	2–0	Aberdeen	Ibrox Stadium
15:00 BST	Defoe (yellow card) 33'; Tavernier 48' (pen.), 80' (pen.)	Report	Considine (yellow card) 44' (yellow-red card) 79'; Lewis (yellow card) 81'; McKenna (yellow card) 90+1'	Attendance: 49,667; Referee: Don Robertson
Note: Game televised on Sky Sports football

4 May 2019 36	Aberdeen	0–3	Celtic	Pittodrie Stadium
12:30 BST	Ball (yellow card) 12'; Logan (yellow card) 43'; Cosgrove (yellow card) 68'	Report	Weah (yellow card) 21'; Ajer (yellow card) 23'; Lustig 40'; Šimunović 53'; Édouard 88'; Brown (yellow card) 90+1'	Attendance: 15,189; Referee: John Beaton
Note: Game televised on Sky Sports football

10 May 2019 37	Aberdeen	2–1	Hearts	Pittodrie Stadium
19:45 BST	Considine (yellow card) 49'; Ferguson 54'; Stewart 77'; Lewis (yellow card) 88'	Report	Burns (yellow card) 21' (goal) 65'; Clare (yellow card) 48'; Dikamona (yellow card) 80'; MacLean (yellow card) 90'	Attendance: 14,371; Referee: Bobby Madden
Note: Game televised on BT Sport 1

19 May 2019 38	Hibernian	1–2	Aberdeen	Easter Road
15:00 BST	McNulty 26'; Milligan (yellow card) 34'; Oméonga (yellow card) 79'; McGregor (yellow card) 88'; Mallan (yellow card) 90+1'	Report	Cosgrove 43'; Ball (yellow card) 88'; Wilson 63'	Attendance: 18,631; Referee: Euan Anderson

=== UEFA Europa League ===
==== Qualifying phase ====
26 July 2018 1st Leg	Aberdeen (Scotland)	1–1	(England) Burnley	Aberdeen, Scotland
19:45 BST	Mackay-Steven 19' (pen.); Logan (yellow card) 56'	UEFA; AFC Report	Tarkowski (yellow card) 18'; Lowton (yellow card) 37'; Vokes 80'	Stadium: Pittodrie Stadium; Attendance: 20,313; Referee: Siebert (Germany)

2 August 2018 2nd Leg	Burnley (England)	3–1 (a.e.t.) (4–2 agg.)	(Scotland) Aberdeen	Burnley, England
19:45 BST	Wood 6'; Cork 101'; Barnes 114' (pen.); Lowton (yellow card); Gudmundsson (yellow card)	BBC Report; UEFA	Ferguson 27'; Shinnie (yellow card); Considine (yellow card)	Stadium: Turf Moor; Attendance: 17,404; Referee: Irrati (Italy)

=== Scottish League Cup ===
18 August 2018 Second Round	Aberdeen	4–0	St Mirren	Pittodrie Stadium
15:00 BST	Mackay-Steven 16', 57' (pen.); Shinnie 20'; May 26'	Report	McGinn (yellow card) 44'; Willock (yellow card) 52'	Attendance: 9,011; Referee: Steven McLean

25 September 2018 Quarter final	Hibernian	0–0 (5–6 p)	Aberdeen	Easter Road
19:45 BST	Hyndman (yellow card) 35'; Mallan (yellow card) 42'; Porteous (yellow card) 86'	Report	Devlin (yellow card) 33'; Considine (yellow card) 76'; Ball (yellow card) 105+1'	Attendance: 11,170; Referee: Steven McLean
	Penalties
	Mallan (penalty missed); Slivka (penalty scored); Whittaker (penalty scored); Stevenson (penalty scored); Boyle (penalty scored); Shaw (penalty scored); Agyepong (penalty missed)		(penalty scored) Shinnie; (penalty scored) Mackay-Steven; (penalty missed) McGinn; (penalty scored) Anderson; (penalty scored) May; (penalty scored) Forrester; (penalty scored) McKenna

28 October 2018 Semi final	Aberdeen	1–0	Rangers	Hampden Park
16:30 GMT	Shinnie (yellow card) 3'; Ferguson (yellow card) 45+7' (goal) 79'; McKenna (yellow card) 54'; Lewis (yellow card) 90'	Report	Ejaria (yellow card) 2'; Sadiq (yellow card) 83'	Attendance: 46,186; Referee: John Beaton

2 December 2018 Final	Celtic	1–0	Aberdeen	Hampden Park
15:00 GMT	Forrest (yellow card) 24'; Christie 45+5' (yellow card) 50'; Rogic (yellow card) 59'	Report	Ball (yellow card) 60'; Logan (yellow card) 68'; Ferguson (yellow card) 78'; Cosgrove (yellow card) 78'	Attendance: 50,936; Referee: Andrew Dallas

=== Scottish Cup ===
19 January 2019 Fourth Round	Aberdeen	1–1	Stenhousemuir	Pittodrie Stadium
15:00 GMT	Lowe 21'	Report	McBrearty (yellow card) 52'; McGuigan 71'; Reid (yellow card) 90'	Attendance: 9,661; Referee: Barry Cook

29 January 2019 Fourth Round replay	Stenhousemuir	1–4	Aberdeen	Ochilview Park
19:30 GMT	Munro 53'; Dickson (yellow card) 72'		Logan (yellow card) 8'; McGinn 21'; Cosgrove 30' (pen.); Stewart 38'; Donaldson 67' (o.g.)	Attendance: 2,429; Referee: Barry Cook

10 February 2019 Fifth Round	Aberdeen	4–1	Queen of the South	Pittodrie Stadium
15:30 GMT	McGinn 47'; Considine 63'; Cosgrove 67', 73' (pen.) (yellow card) 8'	Report	Low (yellow card) 39'; Dobbie 50'	Attendance: 7,857; Referee: Euan Anderson
Note: Game televised on BBC One Scotland

3 March 2019 Quarter-final	Aberdeen	1–1	Rangers	Pittodrie Stadium
13:30 GMT	Cosgrove 11' (pen.) (yellow card) 71'; McLennan (yellow card) 53'; Shinnie (yellow card) 72'; Lowe (yellow card) 78'	Report	Morelos (yellow card) 15'; Worrall 49'	Attendance: 15,395; Referee: Kevin Clancy
Note: Game televised on Premier Sports

12 March 2019 Quarter-final replay	Rangers	0–2	Aberdeen	Ibrox Stadium
19:45 GMT	Candeias (yellow card) 30'; Morelos (yellow card) 33'; Davis (yellow card) 90+1'	Report	McGinn 3', (yellow card) 53'; McKenna (yellow card) 34'; May (yellow card) 38'; Ferguson (yellow card) 42'; McLennan 62'; Shinnie (yellow card) 67'; Ball (yellow card) 70'; Campbell (yellow card) 79'; Considine (yellow card) 82'	Attendance: 47,397 (931 Dons fans); Referee: Kevin Clancy

14 April 2019 Semi-final	Aberdeen	0–3	Celtic	Hampden Park
14:00 BST	Ball (yellow card) 27' (yellow-red card) 36'; Considine (yellow card) 54'; Lowe (yellow card) 64'; Ferguson (red card) 67'	Report	Forrest (yellow card) 23' (goal) 45+2'; Édouard 61' (pen.); Rogic 69'	Attendance: 46,773; Referee: Craig Thomson
Note: Game televised on Premier Sports

=== Scottish Challenge Cup ===
14 August 2018 Round 1	Raith Rovers	3–1	Aberdeen Colts	Stark's Park
19:45	Wedderburn 16'; Matthews 28'; Nisbet 30'	Report	Anderson 72'	Attendance: 479; Referee: Grant Irvine

== Squad statistics ==
=== Appearances ===
As of 19 May 2019

No.	Pos	Player	Premiership		Europa League		League Cup		Scottish Cup		Total	
No.	Pos	Player	Apps	Goals	Apps	Goals	Apps	Goals	Apps	Goals	Apps	Goals
1	GK	(England) Joe Lewis	37	0	2	0	4	0	6	0	49	0
2	DF	(England) Shay Logan	25+1	0	2	0	3	0	3	0	34	0
3	DF	(Scotland) Graeme Shinnie (c)	36	3	2	0	4	1	5	0	47	4
4	DF	(Scotland) Andrew Considine	33	2	1	0	4	0	6	1	44	3
5	DF	(Scotland) Scott McKenna	30	2	2	0	3	0	4	0	39	2
7	FW	(Scotland) Greg Stewart	12+3	1	0	0	0	0	5	1	20	2
8	MF	(Republic of Ireland) Stephen Gleeson	7+8	0	0+1	0	1	0	0+2	0	19	0
9	FW	(England) James Wilson	11+12	4	0	0	2+1	0	0+5	0	31	4
10	MF	(Northern Ireland) Niall McGinn	22+5	5	2	0	2+1	0	3+2	3	37	8
11	MF	(Scotland) Gary Mackay-Steven	19+1	4	2	1	4	2	3+1	0	30	7
14	DF	(England) Greg Halford	0+2	0	0	0	0	0	0	0	2	0
16	FW	(England) Sam Cosgrove	29+6	17	2	0	2	0	5	4	44	21
17	FW	(Scotland) Stevie May	21+11	2	0+2	0	1+2	1	4+1	0	42	3
18	DF	(Scotland) Michael Devlin	16+6	1	2	0	3	0	0+3	0	30	1
19	MF	(Scotland) Lewis Ferguson	33	6	2	1	3	1	6	0	44	8
20	GK	(Czech Republic) Tomáš Černý	1+1	0	0	0	0	0	0	0	2	0
21	DF	(England) Dominic Ball	24+7	0	1+1	0	3+1	0	3	0	40	0
23	MF	(Scotland) Frank Ross	1	0	0	0	1	0	0	0	2	0
24	MF	(Scotland) Dean Campbell	1+7	1	0	0	0	0	2	0	10	1
27	FW	(Scotland) Connor McLennan	18+3	3	0	0	0+2	0	3+1	1	27	4
29	DF	(England) Max Lowe	31+2	2	0	0	2+1	0	6	1	42	3
30	GK	(Republic of Ireland) David Craddock	0	0	0	0	0	0	0	0	0	0
31	FW	(Nigeria) David Dangana	0	0	0	0	0	0	0	0	0	0
33	MF	(Scotland) Ethan Ross	0+4	0	0	0	0	0	0+1	0	5	0
34	MF	(Finland) Miko Virtanen	0	0	0	0	0	0	0	0	0	0
37	DF	(Scotland) Jack MacKenzie	0	0	0	0	0	0	0	0	0	0
Players who left the club during the season
7	MF	(Republic of Ireland) Chris Forrester	1+4	0	0+1	0	0+2	0	0	0	8	0
15	FW	(Scotland) Scott Wright (on loan)	4+9	0	0+2	0	2	0	1	0	18	0
25	FW	(Scotland) Bruce Anderson (on loan)	1+13	2	0	0	0+3	0	0	0	17	2
28	DF	(Republic of Ireland) Tommie Hoban	4+1	1	2	0	0	0	2	0	9	1
32	DF	(England) Sam Roscoe (on loan)	0	0	0	0	0	0	0	0	0	0
36	DF	(Wales) Ryan Harrington (on loan)	0	0	0	0	0	0	0	0	0	0

=== Goalscorers ===
As of 19 May 2019

Ranking	Nation	Number	Name	Scottish Premiership	Europa League	League Cup	Scottish Cup	Total
1	(England)	16	Sam Cosgrove	17	0	0	4	21
2	(Northern Ireland)	10	Niall McGinn	5	0	0	3	8
=	(Scotland)	19	Lewis Ferguson	6	1	1	0	8
4	(Scotland)	11	Gary Mackay-Steven	4	1	2	0	7
5	(Scotland)	3	Graeme Shinnie	3	0	1	0	4
=	(England)	9	James Wilson	4	0	0	0	4
=	(Scotland)	27	Connor McLennan	3	0	0	1	4
8	(Scotland)	4	Andrew Considine	2	0	0	1	3
=	(Scotland)	17	Stevie May	2	0	1	0	3
=	(England)	29	Max Lowe	2	0	0	1	3
11	(Scotland)	5	Scott McKenna	2	0	0	0	2
=	(Scotland)	7	Greg Stewart	1	0	0	1	2
=	(Scotland)	25	Bruce Anderson	2	0	0	0	2
14	(Scotland)	18	Michael Devlin	1	0	0	0	1
=	(Scotland)	24	Dean Campbell	1	0	0	0	1
=	(Republic of Ireland)	28	Tommie Hoban	1	0	0	0	1
			Own Goal	1	0	0	1	2
TOTALS				57	2	5	12	76

=== Disciplinary record ===
As of 19 May 2019

Number	Nation	Position	Name	Premiership		Europa League		League Cup		Scottish Cup		Total	
Number	Nation	Position	Name	Booked	Sent off (straight red)	Booked	Sent off (straight red)	Booked	Sent off (straight red)	Booked	Sent off (straight red)	Booked	Sent off (straight red)
1	(England)	GK	Joe Lewis	2	0	0	0	1	0	0	0	3	0
2	(England)	DF	Shay Logan	8	0	1	0	1	0	1	0	11	0
3	(Scotland)	DF	Graeme Shinnie	7	0	1	0	1	0	2	0	11	0
4	(Scotland)	DF	Andrew Considine	8	1	1	0	1	0	2	0	12	1
5	(Scotland)	DF	Scott McKenna	3	1	0	0	1	0	1	0	5	1
7	(Republic of Ireland)	MF	Chris Forrester	1	0	0	0	0	0	0	0	1	0
7	(Scotland)	DF	Greg Stewart	1	0	0	0	0	0	0	0	1	0
8	(Republic of Ireland)	MF	Stephen Gleeson	2	0	0	0	0	0	0	0	2	0
10	(Northern Ireland)	MF	Niall McGinn	1	0	0	0	0	0	1	0	2	0
11	(Scotland)	MF	Gary Mackay-Steven	2	0	0	0	0	0	0	0	2	0
16	(England)	FW	Sam Cosgrove	4	1	0	0	1	0	2	0	7	1
17	(Scotland)	FW	Stevie May	1	0	0	0	0	0	1	0	2	0
18	(Scotland)	DF	Michael Devlin	4	1	0	0	1	0	0	0	5	1
19	(Scotland)	MF	Lewis Ferguson	11	0	0	0	2	0	1	1	14	1
21	(England)	DF	Dominic Ball	6	0	0	0	2	0	1	1	9	1
24	(Scotland)	MF	Dean Campbell	0	0	0	0	0	0	1	0	1	0
27	(Scotland)	FW	Connor McLennan	0	0	0	0	0	0	1	0	1	0
28	(Republic of Ireland)	DF	Tommie Hoban	2	0	0	0	0	0	0	0	2	0
29	(England)	DF	Max Lowe	3	0	0	0	0	0	2	0	5	0
			TOTALS	66	4	3	0	11	0	16	2	96	6

== Team statistics ==
=== League table ===
Pos	Team	Pld	W	D	L	GF	GA	GD	Pts	Qualification or relegation (Note: Teams play each other three times (33 matches), before the league is split into two groups (the top six and the bottom six).)
2	Rangers	38	23	9	6	82	27	+55	78	Qualification for the Europa League first qualifying round (Note: Since the winners of the 2018–19 Scottish Cup, Celtic, qualified for European competition based on league position, the spot awarded to the Scottish Cup winners (Europa League first qualifying round) was passed to the fourth-placed team.)
3	Kilmarnock	38	19	10	9	50	31	+19	67	Qualification for the Europa League first qualifying round
4	Aberdeen	38	20	7	11	57	44	+13	67	Qualification for the Europa League first qualifying round
5	Hibernian	38	14	12	12	51	39	+12	54	
6	Heart of Midlothian	38	15	6	17	42	50	−8	51	

Source: Soccerway BBC
Rules for classification: 1) Points; 2) Goal difference; 3) Goals scored; 4) Play-off (only if deciding champion, UEFA competitions qualification and second stage group allocation).

=== Results by round ===
Round	1	2	3	4	5	6	7	8	9	10	11	12	13	14	15	16	17	18	19	20	21	22	23	24	25	26	27	28	29	30	31	32	33	34	35	36	37	38
Ground	H	A	A	H	A	H	A	H	A	H	H	A	H	A	H	A	H	A	H	H	A	A	H	A	H	H	A	H	A	H	A	H	A	A	A	H	H	A
Result	D	W	D	L	D	W	L	W	L	P	W	W	W	L	P	W	L	W	W	L	W	W	D	W	L	D	W	L	D	D	L	W	W	W	L	L	W	W
Position	6	5	5	8	8	7	7	7	7	8	8	7	6	6	7	6	7	4	3	4	4	4	4	3	3	3	3	3	3	3	4	4	4	3	3	4	4	4

Updated to match(es) played on 19 May 2019. Source: Competitive matches
A = Away; H = Home; W = Win; D = Draw; L = Loss

== Transfers ==
=== Players in ===
Dates	Pos	Nat	Player	From	Fee
1 June 2018	MF	(Scotland)	Lewis Ferguson	(Scotland) Hamilton Academical	Compensation
5 June 2018	MF	(Republic of Ireland)	Chris Forrester	(England) Peterborough United	£150,000
19 June 2018	MF	(Republic of Ireland)	Stephen Gleeson	(England) Ipswich Town	Free
25 July 2018	GK	(Czech Republic)	Tomáš Černý	(Scotland) Partick Thistle	Free
31 August 2018	DF	(Scotland)	Jordan McGregor	(Scotland) Airdrieonians	Free
26 February 2019	DF	(England)	Greg Halford	Unattached	Free

=== Players out ===
Dates	Pos	Nat	Player	To	Fee
15 May 2018	DF	(Iceland)	Kári Árnason	(Iceland) Víkingur	Free
12 June 2018	DF	(Scotland)	Joe MacPherson		Released
14 June 2018	DF	(Republic of Ireland)	Anthony O'Connor	(England) Bradford City	Free
26 June 2018	DF	(Scotland)	Daniel Harvie	(Scotland) Ayr United	Free
19 July 2018	FW	(Republic of Ireland)	Adam Rooney	(England) Salford City	Undisclosed
18 September 2018	DF	(England)	Toby Wells	(England) Barrow	Free
29 September 2018	FW	(England)	Nicky Maynard	(England) Bury	Free
8 January 2019	MF	(England)	Greg Tansey	(Scotland) St. Mirren	Free
10 January 2019	DF	(Scotland)	Jordan McGregor	(Scotland) Stirling Albion	Free
23 January 2019	MF	(Republic of Ireland)	Chris Forrester	(Republic of Ireland) St Patrick's Athletic	Free

=== Loans in ===
Date	Pos	Nat	Name	From	Fee
18 July 2018	DF	(England)	Dominic Ball	(England) Rotherham United	Loan
25 July 2018	DF	(Republic of Ireland)	Tommie Hoban	(England) Watford	Loan
13 August 2018	FW	(England)	James Wilson	(England) Manchester United	Loan
30 August 2018	DF	(England)	Max Lowe	(England) Derby County	Loan
19 January 2019	FW	(Scotland)	Greg Stewart	(England) Birmingham City	Loan

=== Loans out ===
Date	Pos	Nat	Name	To	Fee
6 July 2018	MF	(Scotland)	Seb Ross	(Scotland) Stenhousemuir	Loan
11 July 2018	GK	(Republic of Ireland)	Danny Rogers	(Scotland) St Mirren	Loan
3 August 2018	DF	(Scotland)	Chris Antonazzi	(Scotland) Montrose	Loan
23 August 2018	DF	(Wales)	Ryan Harrington	(Scotland) Montrose	Loan
30 August 2018	DF	(England)	Sam Roscoe	(Scotland) Alloa Athletic	Loan
31 January 2018	FW	(Scotland)	Scott Wright	(Scotland) Dundee	Loan
31 January 2018	FW	(Scotland)	Bruce Anderson	(Scotland) Dunfermline Athletic	Loan
31 January 2018	DF	(Scotland)	Mark Reynolds	(Scotland) Dundee United	Loan

== See also ==
- List of Aberdeen F.C. seasons
