= James Wilson (footballer, born 1995) =

English footballer

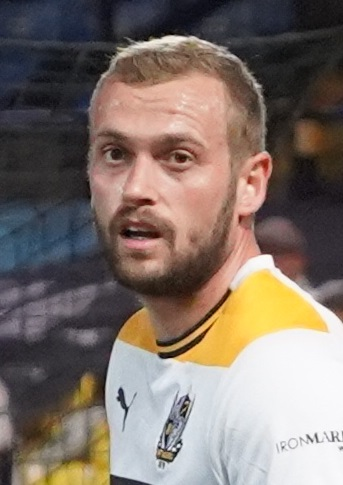
- Wilson in 2023

Personal information
- Full name: James Antony Wilson
- Date of birth: 1 December 1995 (age 30)
- Place of birth: Biddulph, England
- Height: 6 ft 0 in (1.83 m)
- Position: Forward

Youth career
- 2002–2014: Manchester United

Senior career*
Years	Team	Apps	(Gls)
2014–2019	Manchester United	15	(3)
2015–2016	→ Brighton & Hove Albion (loan)	25	(5)
2016	→ Derby County (loan)	4	(0)
2018	→ Sheffield United (loan)	8	(1)
2018–2019	→ Aberdeen (loan)	24	(4)
2019–2020	Aberdeen	11	(0)
2020–2021	Salford City	29	(9)
2021–2024	Port Vale	93	(17)
2024–2025	Northampton Town	9	(0)
Total		218	(39)

International career
2011	England U16	1	(0)
2013	England U19	3	(1)
2014–2015	England U20	4	(0)
2015	England U21	1	(1)
- * Club domestic league appearances and goals

James Antony Wilson (born 1 December 1995) is an English former professional footballer who played as a forward.

He began his career with Manchester United. He was at the club's Academy for ten years before he signed his first professional contract at the age of 17. He has also represented England at the under-16, under-19, under-20 and under-21 levels. He scored two goals on his Premier League debut in May 2014 and played 17 first-team games during the 2014–15 campaign, scoring another two goals. He spent most of the 2015–16 season on loan at Brighton & Hove Albion, scoring five goals in 25 Championship games.

Wilson started the 2016–17 season on loan at Derby County but returned to Old Trafford after suffering a serious knee injury in October. He spent the second half of the 2017–18 season on loan at Sheffield United and joined Scottish Premiership club Aberdeen on loan for the start of the 2018–19 season. He joined Aberdeen permanently in July 2019 and then returned to England to sign with League Two side Salford City in January 2020, where he would gain an EFL Trophy winner's medal. He joined Port Vale after being released from Salford at the end of the 2020–21 campaign. He helped the club to win promotion out of League Two via the play-offs in 2022. He joined Northampton Town for the 2024–25 season.

== Early life and youth career ==
Born in Biddulph, Staffordshire, Wilson was first scouted by Manchester United at the age of seven. He came through the club's youth academy, and made his first appearance for the under-18s as a 14-year-old in a friendly against Slovak side Tatran Prešov on 31 October 2010. After making his competitive debut for the under-18s against West Bromwich Albion on 5 February 2011, he made a further three league appearances for the team during the 2010–11 season, scoring in the third, a 2–1 home defeat to Everton. After scoring twice in the 2011 Milk Cup, in which Manchester United finished runners-up, Wilson suffered a broken ankle in the second game of the 2011–12 season that kept him out for nearly five months. On his return, he became a regular in the under-18s during the second half of the season, scoring five times in 13 league appearances and twice in the FA Youth Cup. He also made his debut for the reserves during the season, coming on as a 61st-minute substitute for Frédéric Veseli in a 1–0 defeat away to West Bromwich Albion on 6 March 2012.

In July 2012, Wilson extended his stay at Old Trafford, signing as an academy scholar. He started the 2012–13 season as a regular in the under-18s, and although it took him five games to score his first goal of the season, he caught up quickly with five goals in that fifth game against Newcastle United on 22 September 2012, the second-most goals scored by a Manchester United player at any level during the tenure of manager Sir Alex Ferguson. After scoring a further five goals in his next four competitive appearances, he was rewarded with his first professional contract on his 17th birthday, and celebrated by scoring twice in a 4–2 home win over Southampton that same day. Although he was ruled out by injury from the middle of January to the start of March 2013, he still finished the season as the under-18s' top scorer with 14 goals in 18 league appearances.

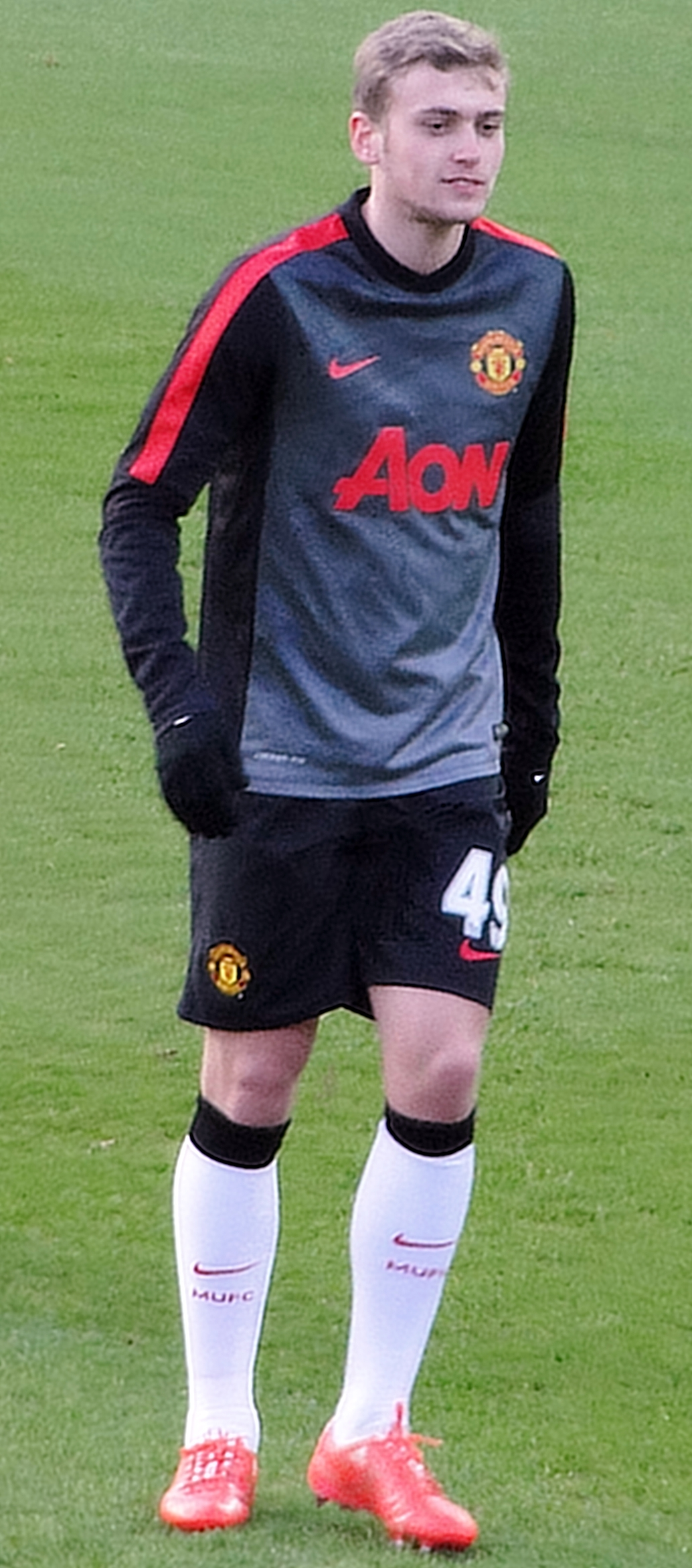
Wilson warming up for Manchester United in 2015

== Club career ==
=== Manchester United ===
Despite playing a prominent role in the reserves' pre-season campaign ahead of the 2013–14 season, Wilson continued as a regular in the under-18s, scoring seven goals in six consecutive appearances at the start of the season (including three in UEFA Youth League fixtures against Bayer Leverkusen and Shakhtar Donetsk), adding another in the reserves' 3–3 Manchester Senior Cup draw with Bury. He became more involved with the reserves in the second half of the season, and after scoring a hat-trick in a 3–0 win over Wolverhampton Wanderers on 10 March 2014, Wilson was given his first taste of first-team action on 5 April with a place on the bench for the 4–0 away win over Newcastle United. He made his senior debut a month later when he started a Premier League match at home to Hull City on 6 May and marked the occasion with two goals in a 3–1 win, a half-volley at the near post and a rebounded goal from a Marouane Fellaini shot, before being replaced by Robin van Persie in the 64th-minute. On 7 August 2014, Wilson scored all four goals, including three in the second half, in the under-21s' 4–1 victory over Manchester City in the Manchester Senior Cup final.

Wilson's first goal of the 2014–15 season came on 17 January, when he came on as a substitute for Jonny Evans and scored in added time at the end of a 2–0 win at Queens Park Rangers. In September 2015, he signed a new contract with the club until June 2019, with an option to extend for a further year. However, he left the club on loan two months later, leading to criticism of manager Louis van Gaal, who defended his decision by saying "I think for him it's better to play at his age than sit on the bench"; assistant manager Ryan Giggs, who had given Wilson his debut, was reportedly frustrated with van Gaal's decision. Wilson was not included in the first-team during José Mourinho's time as manager from May 2016 onwards and was released at the end of the 2018–19 season.

==== Brighton & Hove Albion (loan) ====
On 26 November 2015, Wilson joined Championship club Brighton & Hove Albion on a loan deal until the end of the 2015–16 season. He made his debut for the Seagulls two days later, replacing Bobby Zamora for the final 24 minutes of a 2–1 win over Birmingham City at the Falmer Stadium, and came close to scoring after hitting the post. Wilson made his first league start for Brighton on 5 December, and scored his first goal for the club, as they came from 2–0 down to defeat Charlton Athletic 3–2. He scored his second goal for Brighton a week later on 12 December, in a 2–2 draw with Derby County. Wilson featured in both legs of Brighton's Championship play-off semi-final defeat to Sheffield Wednesday, coming on as a substitute in the first leg for Tomer Hemed and starting in the second leg. Wilson made a total of 28 appearances for Brighton in all competitions throughout his loan spell, scoring five league goals, and manager Chris Hughton said that he was returning to Manchester United as a better player.

==== Derby County (loan) ====
On 20 August 2016, Wilson joined Championship club Derby County on a loan deal lasting until the end of the 2016–17 season. He made his debut for the Rams six days later, coming on as a 56th-minute substitute for Jacob Butterfield in a 1–0 defeat. Manager Nigel Pearson gave him his first start on 10 September, in a 2–0 defeat to Newcastle United at Pride Park Stadium. On 17 October, Wilson suffered a serious knee injury and returned to Manchester United for treatment, his loan spell subsequently being cut short. Newly appointed Derby manager Steve McClaren said that "it's incredibly disappointing news... [but] he will bounce back from this disappointment. As well as being a very good player, he is also a strong and determined character".

==== Sheffield United (loan) ====
On 10 January 2018, Wilson completed a loan move to Championship club Sheffield United until the end of the 2017–18 season. He made his debut at Bramall Lane two days later as a 66th-minute substitute for Clayton Donaldson against Sheffield Wednesday in the Steel City derby, which ended in a 0–0 draw. He made his first start eight days later, and scored the opening goal of a 2–1 victory at Norwich City, earning praise for his work rate after the game from manager Chris Wilder. This would be the only goal of his nine appearances for the Blades.

=== Aberdeen ===
On 13 August 2018, Wilson joined Scottish Premiership side Aberdeen on loan for the rest of the 2018–19 season. He scored his first goal for the Dons on 22 September, in a 1–0 win against Motherwell at Pittodrie. He ended the campaign with four league goals from 12 starts and 12 substitute appearances, including a substitute appearance in the League Cup final defeat to Celtic at Hampden Park. On 3 July 2019, Wilson joined Aberdeen on a permanent basis, signing a two-year contract. Manager Derek McInnes said that "we feel that he showed glimpses towards the end of last season how effective a player he can be and what a positive impact he can have on the team". He played 16 games without scoring a goal in the first half of the 2019–20 season.

=== Salford City ===
On 31 January 2020, he returned to England and signed at 18-month contract with League Two club Salford City. He made his debut in a 3–2 defeat to Plymouth Argyle at Moor Lane on 11 February, scoring two goals after coming on as a substitute, which he described as "bittersweet". He made a further five appearances for Graham Alexander's Ammies in what remained of the 2019–20 campaign. He picked up his first honour after playing in the 2020 EFL Trophy final at Wembley Stadium, where Salford beat Portsmouth on penalties following a 0–0 draw. However, he did not take part in the shoot-out as he was replaced by Luke Burgess on 87 minutes. He was released by new manager Gary Bowyer after scoring eight goals from 29 games in the 2020–21 season.

=== Port Vale ===
James Wilson for Port Vale in November 2021

On 7 June 2021, Salford's League Two rivals Port Vale announced they had signed the player on a two-year contract; manager Darrell Clarke stated that "his pedigree is fantastic and I'm sure he will prove a great attacking threat for us next season". He scored his first goal for the "Valiants" on 18 September, in a 2–0 win over Harrogate Town at Vale Park, and was praised by Clarke for his work-rate in the post-match interview. He started 12 of Vale's first 14 league games of the 2021–22 campaign, building up his fitness from playing the opening 65, 70 or 75 minutes to last 90 minutes twice in a week. He scored a hat-trick in a 5–1 victory over Accrington Stanley in an FA Cup first round match on 6 November. He had scored five goals in four games, when he was sidelined for 'several weeks' with a broken foot. He returned to action in the new year and scored his tenth goal in March; acting manager Andy Crosby praised his strike partnership with Jamie Proctor and said that: "there is more to come from Willo... he appreciates the surroundings, the culture, the environment we have got". He scored both of Vale's goals in the play-off semi-final tie with Swindon Town, and also converted the opening penalty kick in the ensuing penalty shoot-out victory. He was named as man of the match in the play-off final at Wembley Stadium as Vale secured promotion with a 3–0 victory over Mansfield Town; Michael Baggaley of The Sentinel wrote that Wilson put in "a classy performance throughout".

Wilson missed the start of the 2022–23 season with a calf injury and returned to training in September. He went on to form an effective strike partnership with new signing Ellis Harrison. Wilson scored both goals in a 2–0 win at league leaders Plymouth Argyle on 2 December. Injuries limited him to 27 appearances and three League One goals, and though he was offered a new contract, his departure from the club was confirmed on 14 May 2023. After joining the club for pre-season training in Spain in July 2023, he agreed to re-join the club on a six-month deal on 4 August. New manager Andy Crosby said that "I firmly believe there is much more to come from Willo".

He initially missed games as he worked on regaining his fitness, but scored goals in each of his first two league starts of the 2023–24 season and stated, "I love being back". However, on 10 October, Wilson sustained a calf injury during a 1–1 draw with Newcastle United U21 and was ruled out of action for around eight weeks. Upon his return to fitness, Wilson signed a contract extension to run until the end of the season, with director of football David Flitcroft stating that his "dedication to his recovery behind the scenes was outstanding". However, he picked up muscle injury on 29 March, which new manager Darren Moore confirmed would see him miss the rest of the season. He was not retained at the end of the season.

=== Northampton Town ===
On 2 July 2024, Wilson signed for League One club Northampton Town on a one-year contract with the option for a further season. Wilson's adaptability was seen as a major advantage to manager Jon Brady, who liked to play different formations and systems. He made 12 appearances without scoring in the 2024–25 campaign and was not retained by new manager Kevin Nolan.

== International career ==
Wilson made one appearance for the England under-16 team, helping England towards a 10th successive Victory Shield title in a 3–0 win against Northern Ireland in March 2011. In October 2013, Wilson scored on his England under-19 debut in a 6–1 win against Estonia. On 3 September 2015, Wilson scored on his England under-21 debut and only cap in a 1–0 win against the United States.

"...there aren't stats to record the times a player draws a gasp of appreciation from a crowd with a velvety first touch, a daring Houdini spin away from a defender or reverse pass that only he and the recipient ever saw was on."

— The Sentinel reporter Mike Baggaley wrote about Wilson in October 2023.

== Career statistics ==
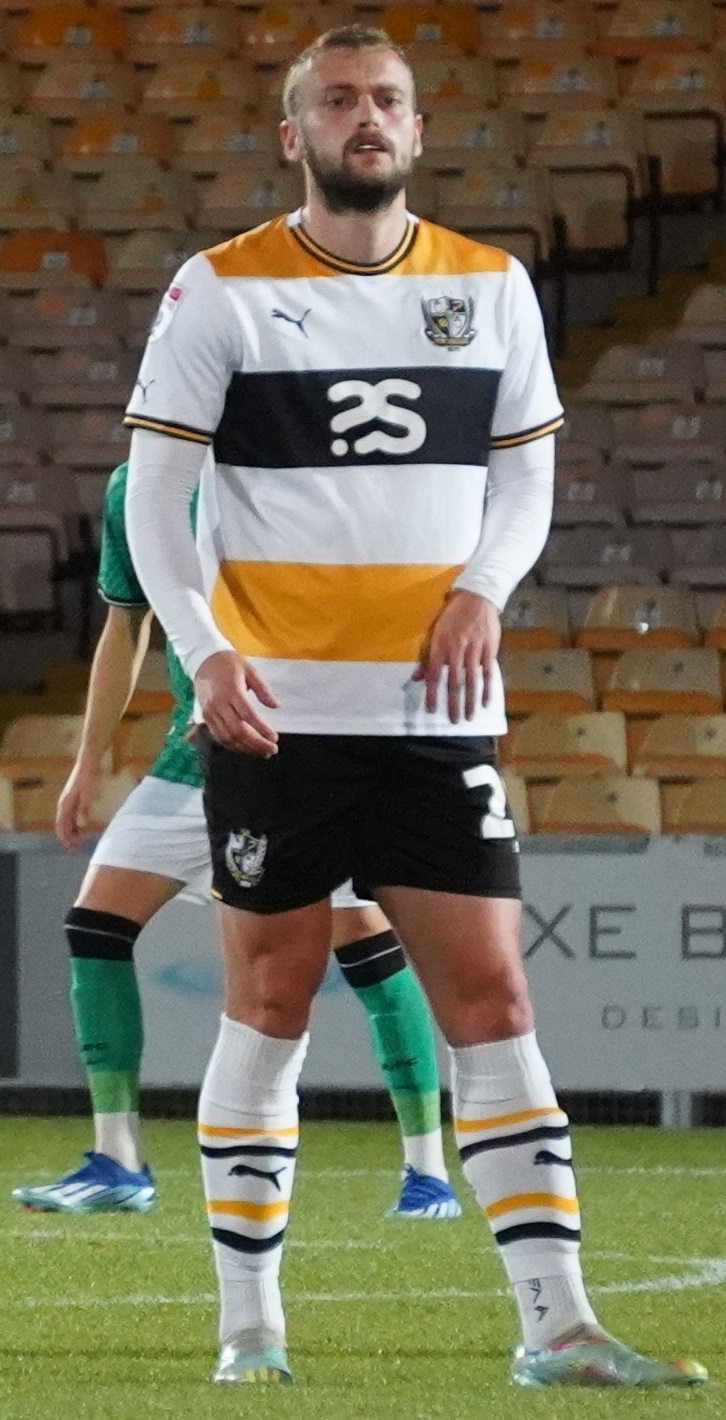
Wilson playing for Port Vale in October 2023

Appearances and goals by club, season and competition
Club	Season	League			National cup (Note: Includes FA Cup, Scottish Cup)		League cup (Note: Includes Football League Cup, Scottish League Cup)		Europe		Other		Total	
Club	Season	Division	Apps	Goals	Apps	Goals	Apps	Goals	Apps	Goals	Apps	Goals	Apps	Goals
Manchester United	2013–14	Premier League	1	2	0	0	0	0	0	0	0	0	1	2
Manchester United	2014–15	Premier League	13	1	3	1	1	0	—		—		17	2
Manchester United	2015–16	Premier League	1	0	0	0	1	0	0	0	—		2	0
Manchester United	2016–17	Premier League	0	0	0	0	0	0	0	0	—		0	0
Manchester United	2017–18	Premier League	0	0	0	0	0	0	0	0	—		0	0
Manchester United	2018–19	Premier League	0	0	0	0	0	0	0	0	—		0	0
Manchester United	Total		15	3	3	1	2	0	0	0	0	0	20	4
Brighton & Hove Albion (loan)	2015–16	Championship	25	5	0	0	—		—		2 (Note: Appearances in Championship play-offs)	0	27	5
Derby County (loan)	2016–17	Championship	4	0	0	0	0	0	—		—		4	0
Sheffield United (loan)	2017–18	Championship	8	1	1	0	—		—		—		9	1
Aberdeen (loan)	2018–19	Scottish Premiership	24	4	5	0	3	0	—		—		32	4
Aberdeen	2019–20	Scottish Premiership	11	0	0	0	2	0	3 (Note: Appearances in UEFA Europa League)	0	—		16	0
Aberdeen	Total		35	4	5	0	5	0	3	0	—		48	4
Salford City	2019–20	League Two	5	2	—		—		—		1 (Note: Appearance(s) in EFL Trophy)	0	6	2
Salford City	2020–21	League Two	24	7	1	0	1	0	—		3	1	29	8
Salford City	Total		29	9	1	0	1	0	—		4	1	35	10
Port Vale	2021–22	League Two	41	9	2	3	1	0	—		3 (Note: Appearances in League Two play-offs)	3	47	15
Port Vale	2022–23	League One	25	4	0	0	0	0	—		2	0	27	4
Port Vale	2023–24	League One	27	4	0	0	3	0	—		1	0	31	4
Port Vale	Total		93	17	2	3	4	0	—		6	3	105	23
Northampton Town	2024–25	League One	9	0	0	0	1	0	—		2	0	12	0
Career total			218	39	12	4	13	0	3	0	14	4	260	47

== Honours ==
Aberdeen

- Scottish League Cup runner-up: 2018–19

Salford City

- EFL Trophy: 2019–20

Port Vale

- EFL League Two play-offs: 2022
