= Max Lowe =

English footballer

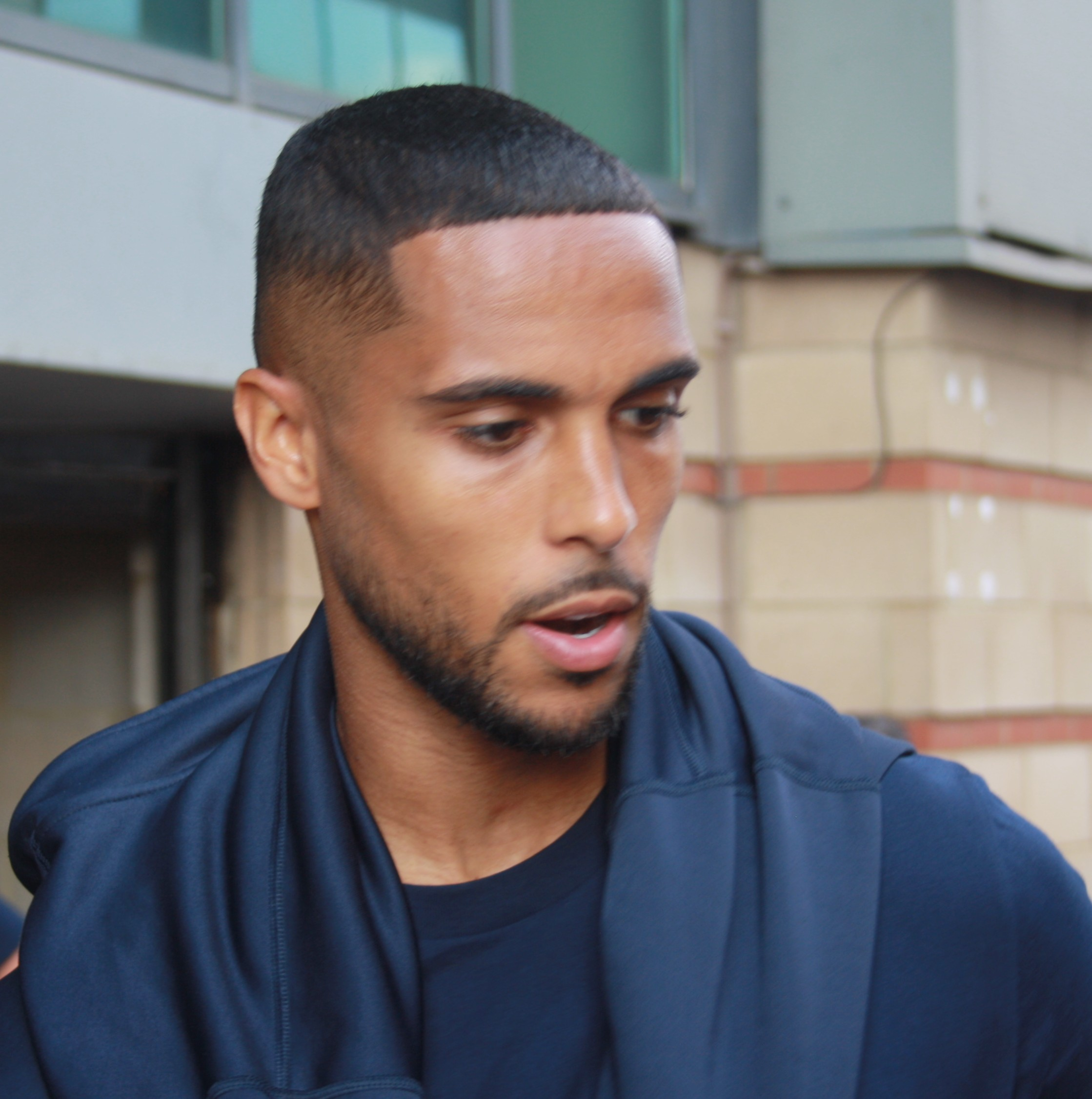
- Lowe in 2026

Personal information
- Full name: Max Josef Lowe
- Date of birth: 11 May 1997 (age 29)
- Place of birth: Birmingham, England
- Height: 1.75 m (5 ft 9 in)
- Positions: Full-back; defensive midfielder

Team information
- Current team: Sheffield Wednesday
- Number: 3

Youth career
- –2013: Derby County

Senior career*
| Years | Team | Apps | (Gls) |
| 2013–2020 | Derby County | 42 | (0) |
| 2018 | → Shrewsbury Town (loan) | 12 | (0) |
| 2018–2019 | → Aberdeen (loan) | 32 | (1) |
| 2020–2024 | Sheffield United | 44 | (1) |
| 2021–2022 | → Nottingham Forest (loan) | 20 | (1) |
| 2024– | Sheffield Wednesday | 69 | (0) |

International career
| 2012–2013 | England U16 | 5 | (0) |
| 2013–2014 | England U17 | 8 | (0) |
| 2014–2015 | England U18 | 5 | (0) |
| 2016–2019 | England U20 | 6 | (0) |
- * Club domestic league appearances and goals as of 19:52, 8 November 2026 (UTC)

Max Josef Lowe (born 11 May 1997) is an English professional footballer who plays as a full-back or defensive midfielder for EFL League One club Sheffield Wednesday. He has represented England at under-16, under-17, under-18 and under-20 level.

== Club career ==
=== Derby County ===
Lowe came through the Derby County academy, and was an unused substitute for the first team on 2 October 2013, as Derby drew 4–4 with Ipswich Town. He went on to turn professional at the club in June 2015. However, he missed much of the 2015–16 season with a hamstring injury. He made his professional debut on 23 August 2016, in a 1–1 draw with Carlisle United in the second round of the EFL Cup at Pride Park Stadium; he converted his penalty in the resulting shoot-out, which Derby won 14–13. On 27 September 2016, Lowe made his League debut in an away game to Cardiff City.

Lowe joined League One side Shrewsbury Town on a half-season loan in January 2018.

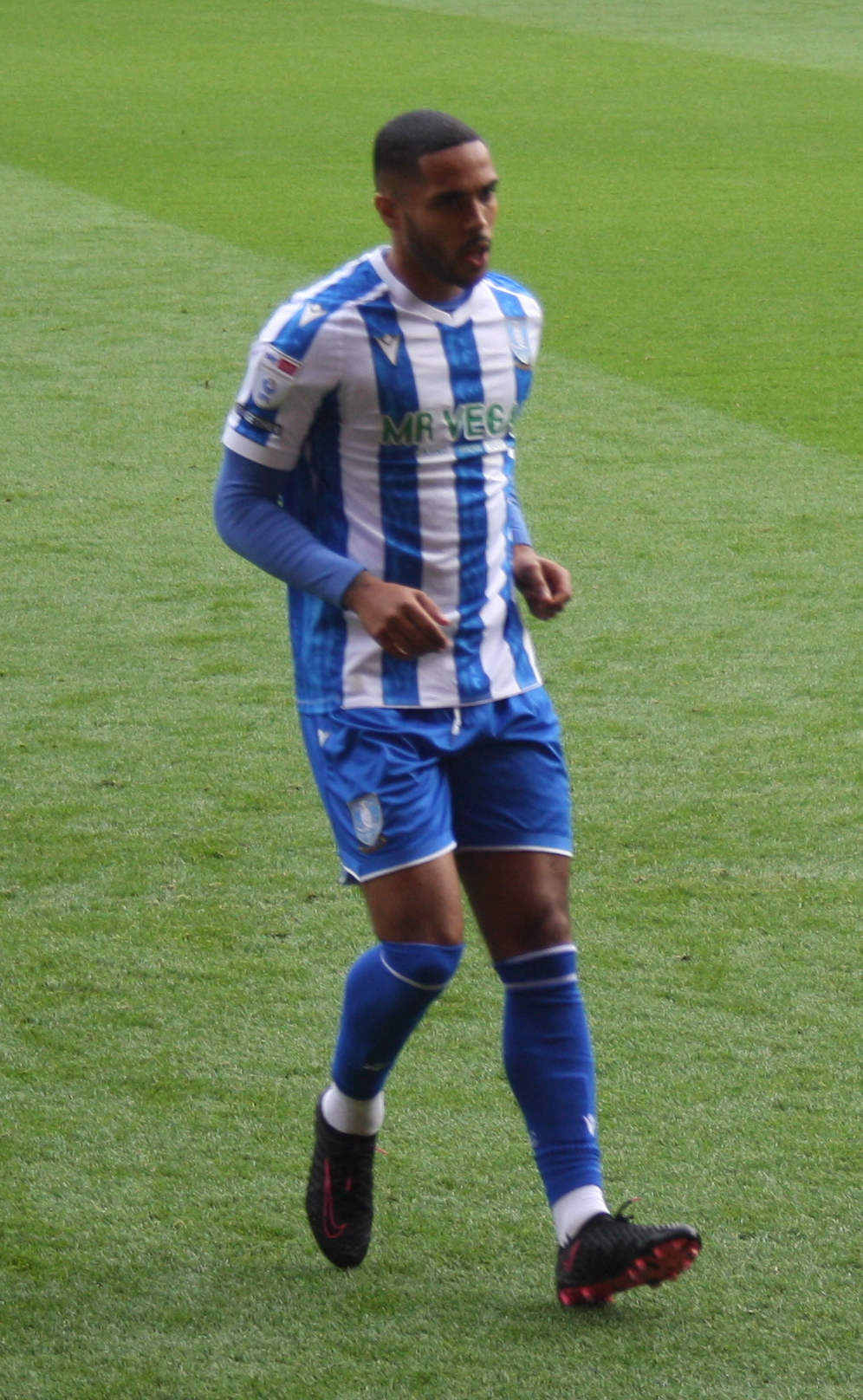
Max Lowe with Sheffield Wednesday in 2025

He was then loaned to Scottish Premiership club Aberdeen in August 2018, on a deal which ran until January 2019. After playing in two games for Derby during January, Lowe returned to Aberdeen on loan for the rest of the 2018–19 season.

=== Sheffield United ===
On 7 September 2020, Sheffield United announced the signing of Lowe on a four-year contract. Lowe made his debut in the EFL Cup in a 5-4 penalty loss to Burnley. His Premier League debut, against Fulham in United's fifth league fixture of the season, lasted only 19 minutes after he had to be withdrawn following a concussion. Lowe came back into the side at left wing-back in defeats to Man City, Chelsea, West Ham and West Brom which left United stranded at the foot of the table with one point from their opening ten fixtures; Wilder admitted that Lowe was starting games "too early" and local media suggesting he looked "lost" and "could quickly find himself sinking without a trace." Following defeat to Leicester City, in which Lowe was booked and subbed at half time, he lost his place in the team, only making two more league appearances (one start, one as substitute) between December and March. As a whole, Lowe made the matchday squad 33 times as Sheffield United were relegated back to the Championship after two seasons, but featured just eight times, with seven appearances from the start, and was fourth-choice full back, leading to suggestions he could leave the club.

On 27 August 2021, Lowe joined Championship side Nottingham Forest on loan for the remainder of the season. on 10 June 2022, Forest announced that Lowe would return to his parent club once the loan had expired.

On 29 May 2024, Sheffield United announced he would be leaving in the summer when his contract expired.

=== Sheffield Wednesday ===
On 15 June 2024, it was confirmed Lowe would be joining Sheffield Wednesday on 1 July 2024 following the expiration of his Sheffield United contract. He made his Wednesday debut against Plymouth Argyle on 11 August 2024, starting the game in a 4–0 victory. In March 2025, it was confirmed by manager Danny Röhl, that an injury sustained against his former club and rivals Sheffield United, would see Lowe miss the rest of the 2024–25 season. In August 2025, amid financial turmoil at Wednesday, Lowe handed in his notice, with other senior players said to be considering doing the same, however he later withdrew that claim and stayed at the club. In June 2026, he signed a new one-year contract with an option.

== International career ==
Lowe featured in the qualifying round of the 2014 UEFA European Under-17 Championship for the England under-17s, playing in the 6–0 win over the Republic of Ireland at the Vazgen Sargsyan Republican Stadium on 29 October 2013.

He was called up to the England under-18 team in September 2014 and the England under-20 team in August 2016.

In May 2019, Lowe returned to the international fold by being included in the England U20 squad for the 2019 Toulon Tournament.

== Career statistics ==
As of 8 November 2026

Appearances and goals by club, season and competition
| Club | Season | League | | | National cup (Note: Includes FA Cup and Scottish Cup) | | League cup (Note: Includes EFL Cup and Scottish League Cup) | | Other | | Total | |
| Club | Season | Division | Apps | Goals | Apps | Goals | Apps | Goals | Apps | Goals | Apps | Goals |
|---|---|---|---|---|---|---|---|---|---|---|---|---|
| Derby County | 2016–17 | Championship | 9 | 0 | 1 | 0 | 2 | 0 | 0 | 0 | 12 | 0 |
| Derby County | 2017–18 | Championship | 0 | 0 | 0 | 0 | 0 | 0 | 0 | 0 | 0 | 0 |
| Derby County | 2018–19 | Championship | 3 | 0 | 1 | 0 | 1 | 0 | 0 | 0 | 5 | 0 |
| Derby County | 2019–20 | Championship | 29 | 0 | 1 | 0 | 1 | 0 | 0 | 0 | 31 | 0 |
| Derby County | Total | | 41 | 0 | 3 | 0 | 4 | 0 | 0 | 0 | 48 | 0 |
| Shrewsbury Town (loan) | 2017–18 | League One | 12 | 0 | 2 | 0 | 0 | 0 | 2 (Note: Appearances in EFL Trophy) | 0 | 16 | 0 |
| Aberdeen (loan) | 2018–19 | Scottish Premiership | 16 | 1 | 0 | 0 | 3 | 0 | 0 | 0 | 19 | 1 |
| Aberdeen (loan) | 2018–19 | Scottish Premiership | 17 | 1 | 6 | 1 | 0 | 0 | 0 | 0 | 23 | 2 |
| Aberdeen (loan) | Total | | 33 | 2 | 6 | 1 | 3 | 0 | 0 | 0 | 42 | 3 |
| Sheffield United | 2020–21 | Premier League | 8 | 0 | 2 | 0 | 1 | 0 | 0 | 0 | 11 | 0 |
| Sheffield United | 2022–23 | Championship | 26 | 1 | 5 | 0 | 1 | 0 | 0 | 0 | 32 | 1 |
| Sheffield United | 2023–24 | Premier League | 10 | 0 | 0 | 0 | 0 | 0 | 0 | 0 | 10 | 0 |
| Sheffield United | Total | | 44 | 1 | 7 | 0 | 2 | 0 | 0 | 0 | 53 | 1 |
| Nottingham Forest (loan) | 2021–22 | Championship | 20 | 1 | 2 | 0 | 0 | 0 | 1 (Note: Appearance in Championship play-offs) | 0 | 23 | 1 |
| Sheffield Wednesday | 2024–25 | Championship | 34 | 0 | 1 | 0 | 2 | 0 | 0 | 0 | 37 | 0 |
| Sheffield Wednesday | 2025–26 | Championship | 28 | 0 | 0 | 0 | 1 | 0 | 0 | 0 | 29 | 0 |
| Sheffield Wednesday | 2026–27 | League One | 7 | 0 | 1 | 0 | 2 | 0 | 0 | 0 | 10 | 0 |
| Sheffield Wednesday | Total | | 69 | 0 | 2 | 0 | 5 | 0 | 0 | 0 | 76 | 0 |
| Career total | | | 219 | 4 | 22 | 1 | 14 | 0 | 3 | 0 | 258 | 5 |

== Honours ==
Shrewsbury Town

- EFL Trophy: runner-up 2017–18

Aberdeen

- Scottish League Cup runner-up: 2018–19

Nottingham Forest

- EFL Championship play-offs: 2022
