= Scott Carson =

English footballer (born 1985)

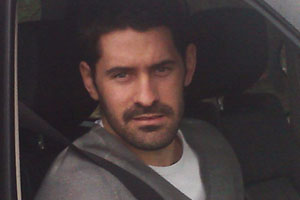
- Carson in 2007

Personal information
- Full name: Scott Paul Carson
- Date of birth: 3 September 1985 (age 41)
- Place of birth: Whitehaven, England
- Height: 6 ft 3 in (1.90 m)
- Position: Goalkeeper

Youth career
- 2000–2001: Cleator Moor Celtic
- 2001–2002: Workington
- 2002–2003: Leeds United

Senior career*
Years	Team	Apps	(Gls)
2003–2005	Leeds United	3	(0)
2005–2008	Liverpool	4	(0)
2006	→ Sheffield Wednesday (loan)	9	(0)
2006–2007	→ Charlton Athletic (loan)	36	(0)
2007–2008	→ Aston Villa (loan)	35	(0)
2008–2011	West Bromwich Albion	110	(0)
2011–2013	Bursaspor	63	(0)
2013–2015	Wigan Athletic	50	(0)
2015–2021	Derby County	158	(0)
2019–2021	→ Manchester City (loan)	1	(0)
2021–2025	Manchester City	0	(0)
Total		469	(0)

International career
2003	England U18	2	(0)
2004–2007	England U21	29	(0)
2006–2007	England B	2	(0)
2006–2011	England	4	(0)
- * Club domestic league appearances and goals

Scott Paul Carson (born 3 September 1985) is an English former professional footballer who played as a goalkeeper.

Carson joined the Leeds United academy in 2002, making his full first-team debut for Leeds against Manchester United in February 2004. In January 2005, he moved to Liverpool for a £750,000 fee and was called up for the England senior team later that year. He made nine appearances for Liverpool, including the UEFA Champions League quarter-final victory over Juventus in April 2005, before going on loan to Sheffield Wednesday, Charlton Athletic and Aston Villa in successive seasons to gain experience. After his return to Liverpool from his loan spell at Aston Villa at the end of the 2007–08 season, he joined West Bromwich Albion for a £3.25 million fee in July 2008. In 2011, he moved to Bursaspor of Turkey. After two years in Turkey, he moved back to England with Wigan Athletic, where he remained until 2015 when he signed for Derby County. Carson joined reigning Premier League champions Manchester City on loan in August 2019 to provide cover for Ederson and Claudio Bravo. He signed permanently for Manchester City in 2021. After 6 years at City, Carson left the club at the expiration of his contract in June 2025 and announced his retirement from professional football 4 months later in October after playing just 107 minutes with the club.

Carson made his first appearance for the England under-21 team in February 2004 and later set a record of 29 caps for the under-21 team. Following the 2007 UEFA European Under-21 Championship, Carson made his full debut for the England senior team against Austria in November 2007, going on to play in a total of four matches with them.

== Club career ==
=== Leeds United ===
Carson was born in Whitehaven, Cumbria, and grew up in Cleator Moor, where he attended Ehenside School. Although a promising rugby league player as a youth, he instead chose to concentrate on football, playing in goal for his school team from the age of "about 11 or 12". He quickly rose through the youth teams at local team Cleator Moor Celtic to play for the men's team when he was 15. He joined the Leeds United football academy in July 2002 after impressing former Leeds defender Peter Hampton while playing for non-league Workington in the FA Youth Cup. He spent less than a year in the academy and half a season with the reserves before making his first-team debut in January 2004, coming on as a late substitute after Paul Robinson was sent off against Middlesbrough. Two weeks later, he made his full debut, starting against Manchester United in a 1–1 draw at Old Trafford, and made one further appearance in the 2003–04 season against Chelsea in May 2004. Robinson left Leeds in May 2004 and Leeds signed Scottish international goalkeeper Neil Sullivan two months later to compete with Carson for a first-team place, and to help Carson develop and improve. Carson's contract was due to expire at the end of the 2004–05 season but Leeds were keen to retain him and in December 2004 offered him a new long-term contract. However, he chose to join Liverpool, who paid Leeds a £750,000 fee for him, in January 2005.

=== Liverpool ===
Carson joined Liverpool on a four-and-a-half-year contract and was to provide competition for Jerzy Dudek for a first-team place. He made his first team debut for Liverpool in March 2005 in a defeat to Newcastle United, and made three consecutive appearances in April, including the home leg of the UEFA Champions League quarter-final victory over Juventus. He was an unused substitute when Liverpool were victorious in the 2005 UEFA Champions League final and 2005 UEFA Super Cup.

==== Loan to Sheffield Wednesday ====
Carson made only four appearances for Liverpool in the 2005–06 season, all in cup competitions, and in March 2006 moved to Sheffield Wednesday on loan. Wednesday sought his services to help solve their goalkeeping crisis, while Carson was looking to gain more first team experience and to challenge for a place in the England 2006 FIFA World Cup squad. He kept five clean sheets in nine appearances for Wednesday, whose assistant manager Kevin Summerfield hailed his contribution as a key factor in helping the club escape relegation. He returned to Liverpool at the end of the season and in July 2006, extended his contract with Liverpool until 2011.

==== Loan to Charlton Athletic ====
In August 2006, Carson joined Charlton Athletic on loan for the 2006–07 season, after Charlton failed in a bid for Norwich City goalkeeper Robert Green. Carson explained that "Liverpool want me to get some experience and then hopefully I can go back next season and be challenging Pepe [Reina] for the number one spot. There were a couple of Championship clubs interested but I need to be playing Premiership football because Robert Green, Ben Foster and Chris Kirkland are going to be playing week in, week out so I need to be performing." He played in 36 of 38 Premier League matches, missing only the two matches against Liverpool due to the terms of his loan deal. Although he was unable to prevent Charlton from being relegated at the end of 2006–07, his outstanding form led him to be named as the Charlton Athletic Player of the Year, the first loan player ever to receive the award.

==== Loan to Aston Villa ====
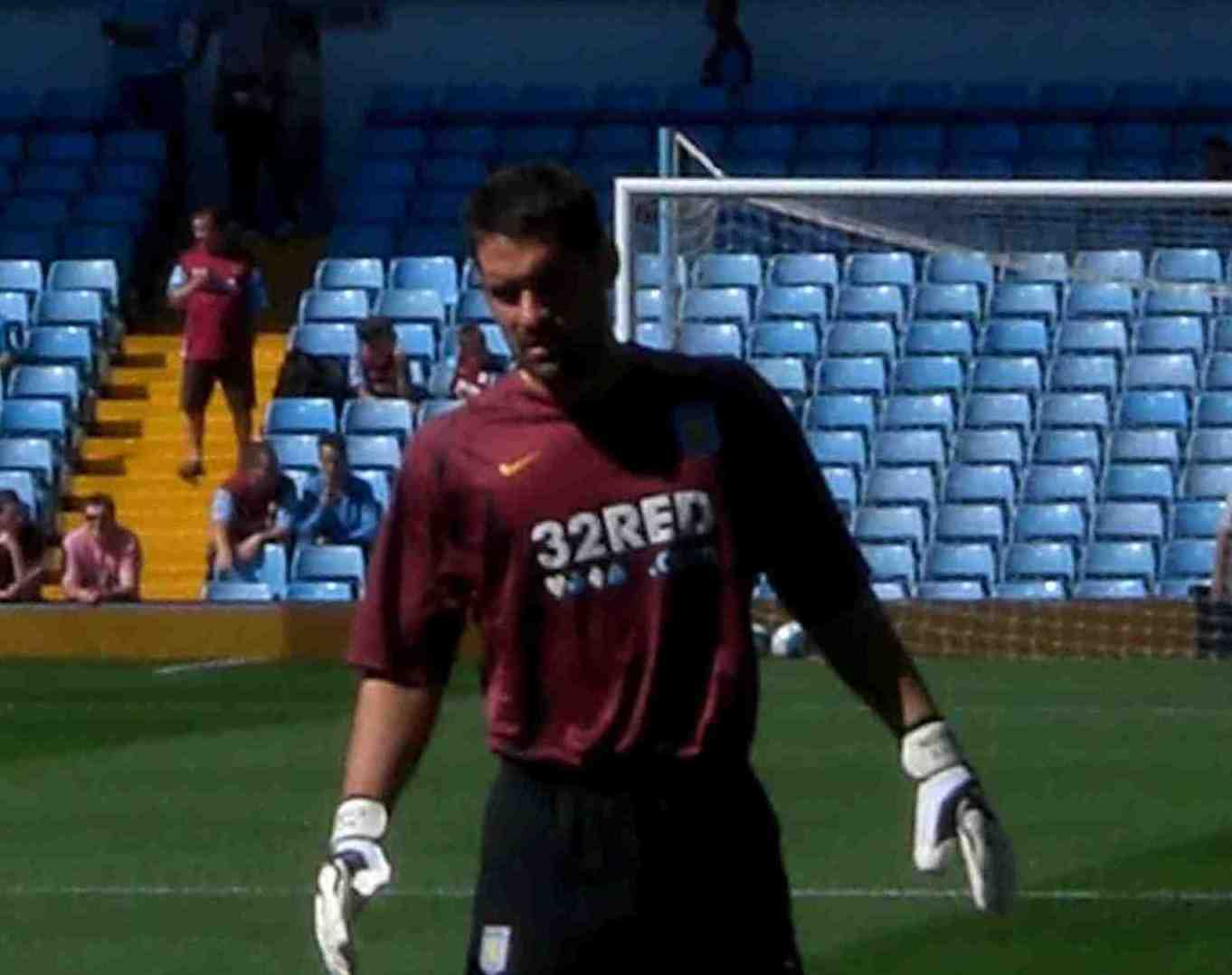
Carson training with Aston Villa in 2007

Carson returned to Liverpool at the end of the season and in June 2007, Liverpool manager Rafael Benítez confirmed that he would be part of the first-team squad for the 2007–08 season, saying "He must fight with Pepe Reina now for a starting place." Carson remained second choice to Reina, however, and faced further competition following the signing of Charles Itandje in August 2007; as a result, Carson was loaned out again, this time to Aston Villa at a cost to Villa of £2 million. Benitez said of the deal, "We do not want to sell him, we are very happy with Scott. But he needs to play to keep up his England place." Aston Villa manager Martin O'Neill preferred Carson to Thomas Sørensen and Stuart Taylor, and Carson played in all but three of Villa's 38 league matches, missing the two matches against Liverpool as he was ineligible to play, and kept 11 clean sheets during the 2007–08 season. He received the first red card of his career when he fouled Carlos Tevez in Villa's 4–1 Premier League defeat to Manchester United.

=== West Bromwich Albion ===
Carson returned to Liverpool at the end of the 2007–08 season but in July 2008 joined West Bromwich Albion on a four-year contract for a £3.25 million fee, possibly rising to £3.75 million, with an option for the club to extend the contract by another year. Carson, who had played for five different clubs since making his debut for Leeds in 2004, explained that he wanted to get settled at one club, saying "I've been like a nomad for three or four years. It'll be good to get some roots and hopefully settle. I can see myself here for four or five years, even longer." He made his debut in a 1–0 defeat to Arsenal in the opening match of the 2008–09 Premier League season. Despite relegation to the Championship, Carson kept his first team place and after the departure of captain Jonathan Greening he was given the captaincy. West Bromwich Albion won promotion back to the Premier League, finishing second, 12 points clear of third place Nottingham Forest with Carson keeping 15 clean sheets out of 43 matches. He had been playing regular football for the Midlands club, but in the 2010–11 season, his form seemed to dip and in January 2011, Carson was briefly dropped to the bench for Welsh goalkeeper Boaz Myhill. After the appointment of Roy Hodgson as West Bromwich Albion head coach, he swiftly found himself back in favour at The Hawthorns.

=== Bursaspor ===
On 1 July 2011, Carson completed a move to Turkish Süper Lig club Bursaspor for a £2 million fee. In his first season with Bursaspor he was an ever-present, conceding 35 goals in 34 matches, the fifth-lowest in the 2011–12 Süper Lig season, while the club finished eighth. He also received a runner-up medal for the 2011–12 Turkish Cup.

In his second season in Turkey, he played twenty-nine league matches and conceded thirty-three goals, helping his team concede the sixth-fewest goals in the 2012–13 Süper Lig season. Bursaspor finished fourth and qualified for the 2013–14 UEFA Europa League.

=== Wigan Athletic ===
Carson joined Wigan Athletic for £700,000 on a three-year deal on 4 July 2013.

=== Derby County ===
After Wigan's relegation to League One, Carson signed a two-year deal with Championship club Derby County with an option for a third year. The fee was undisclosed. At the end of the 2016–17 season, Carson was announced as Derby's Player of the Year.

=== Manchester City ===
Carson signed for reigning Premier League champions Manchester City on 8 August 2019 on loan for the 2019–20 season, as the third-choice goalkeeper behind Ederson and Claudio Bravo. He extended his loan for the 2020–21 season. On 14 May 2021, he made his first Premier League appearance in almost a decade in a 4–3 away win over Newcastle United. During the match, Carson saved a Joe Willock penalty but let in the rebound after the ball fell kindly back to Willock.

On 14 June 2021, it was announced that he would leave Derby at the end of the season, following the expiry of his contract. He joined Manchester City permanently. On 9 March 2022, in the second leg of the round of 16 of the UEFA Champions League, against Portuguese side Sporting CP, Carson came off the bench with twenty minutes to go to play his first Champions League match in seventeen years. Carson went on to preserve a clean sheet in a 0–0 draw, since City had beat Sporting 5–0 in the first leg; the English side moved on to the next stage.

Carson would extend his stay with City for a fourth season on 14 June 2022, by signing a new one-year contract. He was an unused substitute when City were victorious in the 2023 UEFA Champions League final over Inter Milan, which was contested at the same stadium he had won the 2005 UEFA Champions League final for Liverpool against Inter's local rivals AC Milan. He thus equalled the record for the longest gap between a first and last European Cup title (18 years), shared with Milan's Paolo Maldini and Alessandro Costacurta.

On 16 June 2023, it was announced that Carson had signed a one-year extension to his contract, keeping him at the club until the end of the 2023–24 season. On 23 May 2024, Carson signed a further one-year contract extension keeping him at the club until the end of the 2024–25 season.

On 9 June 2025, Manchester City announced that Carson would leave the club upon the expiration of his contract at the end of the month.

Later that year, on 23 October 2025, Carson announced his retirement from professional football, four months after departing from Manchester City.

== International career ==
Carson was first called up to the England under-21 squad in October 2003, a month after his 18th birthday, for the 2004 UEFA European Under-21 Championship qualifier against Turkey. At the time he was yet to make his competitive debut for Leeds United's first team, and had previously played only four matches for England at other levels. He made his under-21 debut in a 3–2 win for England against the Netherlands in February 2004. He was selected in the squad for the 2007 UEFA European Under-21 Championship, and in the third match against Serbia, he earned his 28th under-21 cap, eclipsing the record held by Gareth Barry and Jamie Carragher. His 29th and final cap came against the hosts, the Netherlands, in the semi-final, which finished level at 1–1 after extra-time. In the resultant penalty shoot-out, he saved one of the 16 penalties he faced and also scored one himself, but England lost 13–12. Carson has since been overtaken by James Milner as the England Under-21 team's most-capped player.

In May 2005, while still a member of the under-21 team, Carson was called up to the England senior team squad for the team's tour of the United States later that month. A year later, he came on as substitute for Robert Green, who had suffered a serious injury, in the England B international friendly against Belarus in May 2006. The injury to Green, who had been named in the England squad for the 2006 FIFA World Cup, led to Carson, who was on standby, being promoted to the England squad for the tournament, although he did not make any appearances. Carson continued to be selected for the England senior team squad, and in May 2007, made his second appearance for the England B team in a 3–1 win over Albania. Following the 2007 UEFA Under-21 Championships, he made his full England debut in a friendly against Austria in November 2007 when he kept a clean sheet. A week later, he made his competitive debut replacing Paul Robinson in a crucial match against Croatia, which England lost 3–2, resulting in their failure to qualify for UEFA Euro 2008. Carson was held particularly culpable for the first goal, when Niko Kranjčar cut inside and his dipping speculative shot from 30 yards dipped and bounced in front of him, with Carson only succeeding in parrying the ball into the net as it squirmed through him. England coach Steve McClaren was dismissed the next day, as commentators criticised McClaren for selecting an inexperienced goalkeeper for the match.

New manager Fabio Capello named Carson in his first England squad for the friendly match against Switzerland in February 2008, but the goalkeeper did not make the final squad for the match against France the following month due to injury. After failing to make Capello's squads for the next five internationals, Carson was recalled to the England squad in October 2008 for the 2010 FIFA World Cup qualifiers against Kazakhstan and Belarus. He won his third England cap in November 2008, in a friendly against Germany in Berlin when he came on for the second half. In doing so he became the first West Bromwich Albion player to play for England for 24 years. He won his fourth cap as a second-half substitute against Sweden on 15 November 2011, becoming the first-ever Bursaspor player to play for England in the club's history.

== Personal life ==
Carson's son, Hayden, currently plays for Salford City B.

== Career statistics ==
=== Club ===
Appearances and goals by club, season and competition
Club	Season	League			National cup (Note: Includes FA Cup, Turkish Cup)		League cup (Note: Includes Football League/EFL Cup)		Europe		Other		Total	
Club	Season	Division	Apps	Goals	Apps	Goals	Apps	Goals	Apps	Goals	Apps	Goals	Apps	Goals
Leeds United	2003–04	Premier League	3	0	0	0	0	0	—		—		3	0
Leeds United	2004–05	Championship	0	0	0	0	0	0	—		—		0	0
Leeds United	Total		3	0	0	0	0	0	—		—		3	0
Liverpool	2004–05	Premier League	4	0	—		0	0	1 (Note: Appearance(s) in UEFA Champions League)	0	—		5	0
Liverpool	2005–06	Premier League	0	0	1	0	1	0	2	0	0	0	4	0
Liverpool	Total		4	0	1	0	1	0	3	0	0	0	9	0
Sheffield Wednesday (loan)	2005–06	Championship	9	0	—		—		—		—		9	0
Charlton Athletic (loan)	2006–07	Premier League	36	0	0	0	2	0	—		—		38	0
Aston Villa (loan)	2007–08	Premier League	35	0	1	0	0	0	—		—		36	0
West Bromwich Albion	2008–09	Premier League	35	0	4	0	0	0	—		—		39	0
West Bromwich Albion	2009–10	Championship	43	0	4	0	0	0	—		—		47	0
West Bromwich Albion	2010–11	Premier League	32	0	0	0	0	0	—		—		32	0
West Bromwich Albion	Total		110	0	8	0	0	0	—		—		118	0
Bursaspor	2011–12	Süper Lig	34	0	3	0	—		4 (Note: Appearances in UEFA Europa League)	0	—		41	0
Bursaspor	2012–13	Süper Lig	29	0	3	0	—		4	0	—		36	0
Bursaspor	Total		63	0	6	0	—		8	0	—		77	0
Wigan Athletic	2013–14	Championship	16	0	2	0	0	0	4	0	3 (Note: One appearance in FA Community Shield, two appearances in Championship play-offs)	0	25	0
Wigan Athletic	2014–15	Championship	34	0	0	0	0	0	—		—		34	0
Wigan Athletic	Total		50	0	2	0	0	0	4	0	3	0	59	0
Derby County	2015–16	Championship	36	0	1	0	0	0	—		2 (Note: Appearances in Championship play-offs)	0	39	0
Derby County	2016–17	Championship	46	0	2	0	2	0	—		—		50	0
Derby County	2017–18	Championship	46	0	1	0	0	0	—		2	0	49	0
Derby County	2018–19	Championship	30	0	0	0	3	0	—		0	0	33	0
Derby County	2019–20	Championship	0	0	—		—		—		—		0	0
Derby County	Total		158	0	4	0	5	0	—		4	0	171	0
Manchester City (loan)	2019–20	Premier League	0	0	0	0	0	0	0	0	0	0	0	0
Manchester City (loan)	2020–21	Premier League	1	0	0	0	0	0	0	0	—		1	0
Manchester City (loan)	Total		1	0	0	0	0	0	0	0	0	0	1	0
Manchester City	2021–22	Premier League	0	0	0	0	0	0	1	0	0	0	1	0
Manchester City	2022–23	Premier League	0	0	0	0	0	0	0	0	0	0	0	0
Manchester City	2023–24	Premier League	0	0	0	0	0	0	0	0	0	0	0	0
Manchester City	2024–25	Premier League	0	0	0	0	0	0	0	0	0	0	0	0
Manchester City	Total		0	0	0	0	0	0	1	0	0	0	1	0
Career total			469	0	22	0	8	0	16	0	7	0	522	0

=== International ===
Appearances and goals by national team and year
National team	Year	Apps	Goals
England	2006	0	0
England	2007	2	0
England	2008	1	0
England	2009	0	0
England	2010	0	0
England	2011	1	0
Total		4	0

== Honours ==
Liverpool

- UEFA Champions League: 2004–05
- UEFA Super Cup: 2005
- Football League Cup runner-up: 2004–05
- FIFA Club World Championship runner-up: 2005

West Bromwich Albion

- Football League Championship runner-up: 2009–10

Bursaspor

- Turkish Cup runner-up: 2011–12

Manchester City

- FA Community Shield: 2024
- UEFA Champions League: 2022–23; runner-up: 2020–21
- UEFA Super Cup: 2023
- FIFA Club World Cup: 2023
- FA Cup runner-up: 2023–24

Individual

- Charlton Athletic Player of the Year: 2006–07
- Derby County Player of the Year: 2016–17
- EFL Championship Player of the Month: December 2017
