= 2016–17 Derby County F.C. season =

Derby County
2016–17 season
- Chairman: Mel Morris
- Manager: Nigel Pearson (until 27 September); Steve McClaren (from 12 October until 12 March); Gary Rowett (from 14 March)
- Stadium: Pride Park Stadium
- Championship: 9th
- FA Cup: Fourth round
- League Cup: Third round
- Top goalscorer: League: Tom Ince (14); All: Tom Ince (15)
- Highest home attendance: 32,616
- Lowest home attendance: 26,301
- Average home league attendance: 29,042
Home colours	Away colours	Third colours

The 2016–17 season was Derby County's ninth consecutive season in the Championship in their 133rd year in existence. Along with competing in the Championship, the club also participated in the FA Cup and League Cup.

The season covers the period from 1 July 2016 to 30 June 2017.

== Transfers ==
=== Transfers in ===
Date from	Position	Nationality	Name	From	Fee	Ref.
27 August 2016	CF	CZE	Matěj Vydra	Watford	£8,000,000	
31 August 2016	RM	SCO	Ikechi Anya	Watford	Undisclosed	
31 August 2016	GK	ENG	Chris Weale	Yeovil Town	Free transfer	
9 January 2017	CF	ENG	David Nugent	Middlesbrough	Undisclosed	
27 January 2017	RW	SCO	Kyle McAllister	St Mirren	Undisclosed	

=== Transfers out ===
Date from	Position	Nationality	Name	To	Fee	Ref.
1 July 2016	DM	ENG	Jared Bird	Free agent	Released	
1 July 2016	LW	ESP	Iván Calero	Sparta Rotterdam (Note: Following Calero's release, he signed for Sparta Rotterdam.)	Released	
1 July 2016	DM	ENG	James Carvell	Free agent	Released	
1 July 2016	DM	GER	Tom Koblenz	Jägersburg	Released	
1 July 2016	CF	ENG	Shaq McDonald	Nuneaton Town (Note: Following McDonald's release, he signed for Nuneaton Town.)	Released	
1 July 2016	GK	NOR	Mats Mörch	Free agent	Released	
1 July 2016	CF	IRL	Conor Sammon	Heart of Midlothian (Note: Following Sammon's release, he signed for Heart of Midlothian.)	Released	
1 July 2016	RB	ENG	Ryan Shotton	Birmingham City	Undisclosed	
1 July 2016	CF	ENG	Kwame Thomas	Coventry City (Note: Following Thomas' release, he signed for Coventry City.)	Released	
1 July 2016	LB	ENG	Stephen Warnock	Wigan Athletic (Note: Following Warnock's release, he signed for Wigan Athletic.)	Released	
9 July 2016	CB	ESP	Raúl Albentosa	Deportivo La Coruña	Undisclosed	
26 July 2016	CB	ENG	Jake Buxton	Wigan Athletic	Undisclosed	
31 August 2016	CM	IRL	Jeff Hendrick	Burnley	£10,500,000	
4 January 2017	GK	ENG	Lee Grant	Stoke City	£1,300,000	
17 January 2017	GK	ENG	Chris Weale	Free agent	Mutual consent	

=== Loans in ===
Date from	Position	Nationality	Name	From	Date until	Ref.
21 August 2016	CF	ENG	James Wilson	Manchester United	2 February 2017	(Note: On 2 February 2017, James Wilson's loan was terminated.)
5 January 2017	DM	BEL	Julien De Sart	Middlesbrough	End of Season	

=== Loans out ===
Date from	Position	Nationality	Name	To	Date until	Ref.
24 August 2016	GK	NED	Kelle Roos	Bristol Rovers	10 January 2017 (Note: On 10 January 2017, Kelle Roos was recalled from his loan with Bristol Rovers.)	
31 August 2016	GK	ENG	Lee Grant	Stoke City	3 January 2017	
31 August 2016	CF	SCO	Chris Martin	Fulham	End of Season	
10 November 2016	RM	BRA	Alefe Santos	Eastleigh	2 January 2017	
11 January 2017	CM	ENG	Callum Guy	Port Vale	End of Season	
17 January 2017	CB	ENG	Farrend Rawson	Coventry City	End of Season	
19 January 2017	RW	AUT	Andreas Weimann	Wolverhampton Wanderers	End of Season	
23 January 2017	AM	ENG	Charles Vernam	Coventry City	End of Season	
25 January 2017	DM	ENG	Jamie Hanson	Wigan Athletic	End of Season	

== Competitions ==
=== Pre-season friendlies ===
15 July 2016 Friendly	(Portugal) Vitória de Setúbal	1–0	Derby County	Algarve, Portugal
21:30 CEST	Costinha 11'	Report

16 July 2016 Friendly	(Portugal) Benfica	4–0	Derby County	Algarve, Portugal
21:30 CEST	Semedo 18'; Fonte 54'; Almeida 62'; Salvio 88'	Report

23 July 2016 Friendly	Walsall	0–2	Derby County	Bescot
15:00 WEST (UTC+01:00)		Report	Bent 35'; Ince 68'	Stadium: Bescot Stadium; Attendance: 2933

26 July 2016 Friendly	Chesterfield	1–2	Derby County	Chesterfield
19:30 BST	O'Shea 56'	Report	Bent 52'; Rawson 66'	Stadium: Proact Stadium

27 July 2016 Friendly	Sheffield United	0–1	Derby County	Sheffield
19:45 BST		Report	Blackman 32' (pen.)	Stadium: Bramall Lane

30 July 2016 Friendly	(Germany) Karlsruher SC	0–2	Derby County	Karlsruhe, Germany
14:30 BST		Report	Weimann 55'; Bent 76'	Stadium: Wildparkstadion

=== Championship ===
==== League table ====
Pos	Team	Pld	W	D	L	GF	GA	GD	Pts
7	Leeds United	46	22	9	15	61	47	+14	75
8	Norwich City	46	20	10	16	85	69	+16	70
9	Derby County	46	18	13	15	54	50	+4	67
10	Brentford	46	18	10	18	75	65	+10	64
11	Preston North End	46	16	14	16	64	63	+1	62

Source: English Football League, Soccerway
Rules for classification: 1) Points; 2) Goal difference; 3) Number of goals scored; 4) Points in head-to-head matches; 5) Goal difference in head-to-head matches; 6) Goals scored in head-to-head matches; 7) Play-off.

==== Matches ====
6 August 2016 1	Derby County	0–0	Brighton & Hove Albion	Derby
15:00 BST	Bryson (yellow card) 41'; Hendrick (yellow card) 84'	Report	Kayal (yellow card) 60'; Knockaert (yellow card) 72'	Stadium: Pride Park Stadium; Attendance: 28,749 (1,354 Brighton supporters)

13 August 2016 2	Barnsley	2–0	Derby County	Barnsley
15:00 BST	Carson 11' (o.g.); Watkins (yellow card) 33'; Mawson 47'; Hourihane (yellow card) 56'; Hammill (yellow card) 81'	Report	Butterfield (yellow card) 47'; Bryson (yellow card) 58'; Christie (yellow card) 77'; Ince (yellow card) 83'	Stadium: Oakwell; Attendance: 15,049 (3,932 Derby supporters)

16 August 2016 3	Preston North End	0–1	Derby County	Preston
19:45 BST	Pringle (yellow card) 86'	Report	Forsyth 87'	Stadium: Deepdale; Attendance: 10,628 (1,150 Derby supporters)

20 August 2016 4	Derby County	0–0	Aston Villa	Derby
17:30 BST	Hughes (yellow card) 57'; Keogh (yellow card) 59'; Bryson (yellow card) 60'	Report	Bacuna (yellow card) 47'; McCormack (yellow card) 60'; Cissokho (yellow card) 73'	Stadium: Pride Park Stadium; Attendance: 31,205 (3,070 away supporters)

26 August 2016 5	Burton Albion	1–0	Derby County	Burton upon Trent
19:45 BST	Irvine 12'; Turner (yellow card) 89'		Bryson (yellow card) 78'	Stadium: Pirelli Stadium

10 September 2016 6	Derby County	0–2	Newcastle United	Derby
17:30 BST		Report	Gouffran 20' (yellow card) 60'; Shelvey (yellow card) 24'; Gayle (yellow card) 76'; Yedlin 90+1'	Stadium: iPro Stadium; Attendance: 30,405 (3,177 Newcastle supporters)

13 September 2016 7	Derby County	0–1	Ipswich Town	Derby
19:45 BST		Report	Skuse (yellow card) 36'; Berra (yellow card) 40'; Varney (yellow card) 48' (goal) 53'; Pitman (yellow card) 90'	Stadium: iPro Stadium; Attendance: 26,425 (687 Ipswich supporters)

17 September 2016 8	Bristol City	1–1	Derby County	Bristol
15:00 BST	Wilbraham 90+4'	Report	Anya 44'	Stadium: Ashton Gate Stadium; Attendance: 19,451 (1,525 away)

24 September 2016 9	Derby County	1–2	Blackburn Rovers	Derby
15:00 BST	Vydra 69'; Christie (yellow card) 77'	Report	Lowe (yellow card) 29'; Evans (yellow card) 37'; Emnes 70'; Graham 73'	Stadium: iPro Stadium; Attendance: 26,602 (523 Blackburn supporters)

27 September 2016 10	Cardiff City	0–2	Derby County	Cardiff
19:45 BST	Whittingham (yellow card) 33'; Connolly (red card) 80'	Report	Butterfield (yellow card) 52'; Ince 55'; Blackman 80' (pen.); Johnson (yellow card) 90+2'	Stadium: Cardiff City Stadium; Attendance: 14,131; Referee: Geoff Eltringham

1 October 2016 11	Reading	1–1	Derby County	Reading
15:00 BST	McCleary (yellow card) 60'; Gunter (yellow card) 61'; Evans 90'	Report	Johnson (yellow card) 44'; Vydra 62'; Hughes (yellow card) 65'; Ince (yellow card) 90'; Butterfield (yellow card) 90+4'	Stadium: Madejski Stadium; Attendance: 17,002; Referee: Tim Robinson

15 October 2016 12	Derby County	1–0	Leeds United	Derby
15:00 BST	Hughes (yellow card) 47'; Russell 56'; Johnson (yellow card) 72'	Report		Stadium: iPro Stadium; Attendance: 31,170; Referee: Tony Harrington

18 October 2016 13	Derby County	0–0	Brentford	Derby
19:45 BST				Stadium: iPro Stadium; Attendance: 26,707; Referee: Scott Duncan

22 October 2016 14	Huddersfield Town	1–0	Derby County	Huddersfield
15:00 BST	Wells (yellow card) 40'; Hogg (yellow card) 57'; Kachunga 90+3'	Report	Hughes (yellow card) 65'	Stadium: The John Smith's Stadium; Attendance: 19,749; Referee: Peter Bankes

29 October 2016 15	Derby County	2–0	Sheffield Wednesday	Derby
15:00 BST	Christie 17'; Pearce 67'; Ince (yellow card) 82'	Report	Palmer (yellow card) 51'; Hutchinson (yellow card) 66'; Nuhiu (yellow card) 90+1'	Stadium: iPro Stadium; Attendance: 30,064; Referee: James Linington

5 November 2016 16	Wolverhampton Wanderers	2–3	Derby County	Wolverhampton
12:30 GMT	Saville (yellow card) 34'; Costa 61'; Cavaleiro (yellow card) 77'; Doherty (yellow card) 79'; Coady (yellow card) 80'; Edwards 82'; Borthwick-Jackson (yellow card) 90+2'	Report	Ince 6', 77' (pen.); Bent 15'; Hughes (yellow card) 36'	Stadium: Molineux Stadium; Attendance: 19,858; Referee: Paul Tierney

19 November 2016 17	Derby County	3–0	Rotherham United	Derby
15:00 GMT	Ince 15', 68'; Bent 19'	Report		Stadium: iPro Stadium; Attendance: 28,191; Referee: Oliver Langford

26 November 2016 18	Derby County	1–0	Norwich City	Derby
15:00 GMT	Johnson 65'; Pearce (yellow card) 86'; Weimann (yellow card) 90+5'	Report	Lafferty (yellow card) 78'; Martin (yellow card) 85'	Stadium: iPro Stadium; Attendance: 29,311; Referee: Simon Hooper

3 December 2016 19	Wigan Athletic	0–1	Derby County	Wigan
15:00 GMT	Perkins (yellow card) 45+1'	Report	Olsson (yellow card) 10'; Johnson 16' (yellow card) 38'; Hughes (yellow card) 85'	Stadium: The DW Stadium; Attendance: 12,526; Referee: Andrew Madley

11 December 2016 20	Derby County	3–0	Nottingham Forest	Derby
12:00 GMT	Johnson (yellow card) 9'; Bent (yellow card) 10'; Bendtner 33' (o.g.); Ince 55'; Hughes 64' (yellow card) 71'	Report	Osborn (yellow card) 9'; Perquis (yellow card) 10'; Lam (yellow card) 50'; Cash (yellow card) 65'	Stadium: iPro Stadium; Attendance: 32,600; Referee: Chris Kavanagh

14 December 2016 21	Queens Park Rangers	0–1	Derby County	Shepherd's Bush, London
19:45 GMT		Report	Butterfield (yellow card) 17'; Baird (yellow card) 26'; Ince 86'	Stadium: Loftus Road Stadium; Attendance: 12,371; Referee: David Coote

17 December 2016 22	Fulham	2–2	Derby County	Fulham, London
15:00 GMT	Fredericks (yellow card) 32'; Johansen (yellow card) 40' (goal) 61'; Ayité 45+1'; Madl (yellow card) 90+2'	Report	Ince 34'; Pearce 75'; Bryson (yellow card) 85'	Stadium: Craven Cottage; Attendance: 18,748; Referee: Andy Woolmer

27 December 2016 23	Derby County	1–0	Birmingham City	Derby
15:00 GMT	Bent 64' (pen.); Hughes (yellow card) 88'	Report	Davis (yellow card) 56'; Morrison (yellow card) 64'	Stadium: iPro Stadium; Attendance: 32,616; Referee: Graham Scott

31 December 2016 24	Derby County	0–0	Wigan Athletic	Derby
15:00 GMT	Johnson (yellow card) 57'; Hughes (yellow card) 87'	Report		Stadium: iPro Stadium; Attendance: 28,289; Referee: Geoff Eltringham

2 January 2017 25	Norwich City	3–0	Derby County	Norwich
15:00 GMT	Oliveira 15', 78', 80'; Pinto (yellow card) 81'	Report	Keogh (yellow card) 41'; Butterfield (red card) 66'; Carson (yellow card) 67'	Stadium: Carrow Road; Attendance: 26,422; Referee: Darren Bond

13 January 2017 26	Leeds United	1–0	Derby County	Leeds
19:45 GMT	Wood 45'; Bartley (yellow card) 51'; Hernández (yellow card) 56'	Report	Johnson (yellow card) 64' (yellow-red card) 89'; Baird (yellow card) 74'; Ince (yellow card) 82'	Stadium: Elland Road; Attendance: 25,546; Referee: Scott Duncan

21 January 2017 27	Derby County	3–2	Reading	Derby
15:00 GMT	Bent 36'; Ince 63' (yellow card) 90+8'; Hughes 74'; Bryson (yellow card) 79'; Russell (yellow card) 85'	Report	Swift 16' (yellow card) 41'; Méïte 80'; Obita (yellow card) 87' (yellow-red card) 90+6'	Stadium: iPro Stadium; Attendance: 28,393; Referee: Peter Bankes

31 January 2017 28	Ipswich Town	0–3	Derby County	Ipswich
19:45 GMT		Report	Bryson 9'; Ince 12'; Bent 45+4'	Stadium: Portman Road; Attendance: 14,719; Referee: Andrew Madley

4 February 2017 29	Newcastle United	1–0	Derby County	Newcastle
15:00 GMT	Ritchie 27' (yellow card) 86'; Dummett (yellow card) 81'	Report	De Sart (yellow card) 79'	Stadium: St James' Park; Attendance: 52,231; Referee: Darren Bond

11 February 2017 30	Derby County	3–3	Bristol City	Derby
15:00 GMT	Butterfield (yellow card) 41'; Bent 57', 81' (pen.); Keogh (yellow card) 63'; Ince 76'	Report	Taylor 14'; Abraham 27', 38'; Bryan (yellow card) 58'; Flint (yellow card) 66'; Đurić (yellow card) 83'; Hegeler (yellow card) 90+2'	Stadium: iPro Stadium; Attendance: 28,043; Referee: Andrew Davies

14 February 2017 31	Derby County	3–4	Cardiff City	Derby
19:45 GMT	De Sart 7'; Bent 17', 74'	Report	Harris 41', 47'; Noone 57'; Ralls 90' (pen.)	Stadium: iPro Stadium; Attendance: 26,541; Referee: Stephen Martin

21 February 2017 32	Derby County	0–0	Burton Albion	Derby
19:45 GMT	Ince (yellow card) 85'	Report	Naylor (yellow card) 69'	Stadium: iPro Stadium; Attendance: 31,081; Referee: Simon Hooper

25 February 2017 33	Aston Villa	1–0	Derby County	Birmingham
15:00 GMT	Chester 25'; Taylor (yellow card) 79'; Bacuna (red card) 90+3'	Report	Ince (yellow card) 44'; Christie (yellow card) 80'	Stadium: Villa Park; Attendance: 30,935; Referee: Andrew Madley

28 February 2017 34	Blackburn Rovers	1–0	Derby County	Blackburn
19:45 GMT	Nyambe (yellow card) 11'; Guthrie (yellow card) 24'; Conway 58' (pen.); Bennett (yellow card) 83'; Steele (yellow card) 90+2'	Report	Lowe (yellow card) 37'; De Sart (yellow card) 90+3'	Stadium: Ewood Park; Attendance: 10,536; Referee: Darren Bond

4 March 2017 35	Derby County	2–1	Barnsley	Derby
15:00 GMT	Ince 54'; Nugent 76' (yellow card) 90+2'	Report	Yiadom (yellow card) 27'; James 52'; Scowen (yellow card) 58'	Stadium: iPro Stadium; Attendance: 30,280; Referee: Keith Stroud

7 March 2017 36	Derby County	1–1	Preston North End	Derby
19:45 GMT	Vydra 50'; Johnson (yellow card) 81'	Report	McGeady (yellow card) 54'; Barkhuizen 90+4'	Stadium: iPro Stadium; Attendance: 26,301; Referee: James Linington

10 March 2017 37	Brighton & Hove Albion	3–0	Derby County	Brighton
19:45 GMT	Knockaert 5'; Baldock 43'; Murray 78'	Report		Stadium: Falmer Stadium; Referee: Chris Kavanagh

18 March 2017 38	Nottingham Forest	2–2	Derby County	West Bridgford
13:00 GMT	Clough 5'; Fox (yellow card) 80'; Pinillos 90+4'	Report	Vydra 47'; Nugent 53'; Johnson (yellow card) 90+4'	Stadium: City Ground; Attendance: 26,665; Referee: Peter Bankes

31 March 2017 39	Derby County	1–0	Queens Park Rangers	Derby
19:45 BST	Vydra 70'	Report	Freeman (yellow card) 78'	Stadium: iPro Stadium; Attendance: 27,690; Referee: Geoff Eltringham

4 April 2017 40	Derby County	4–2	Fulham	Derby
19:45 GMT	Nugent 8', 42', 59'; Russell 67' (yellow card) 90+3'	Report	Ayité 35', 79'; Lucas Piazon (yellow card) 45+2'; McDonald (yellow card) 87'; Aluko (yellow card) 90'	Stadium: iPro Stadium; Attendance: 27,221; Referee: Jeremy Simpson

8 April 2017 41	Birmingham City	1–2	Derby County	Birmingham
15:00 BST	Adams 68'	Report	Kuszczak 3' (o.g.); Pearce (yellow card) 45+1'; Keogh (yellow card) 90'; Ince 90+1'	Stadium: St Andrew's; Attendance: 19,381; Referee: Andy Davies

14 April 2017 42	Brentford	4–0	Derby County	Brentford
15:00 BST	Vibe 32', 82'; Woods (yellow card) 51'; Barbet (yellow card) 60'; Jota 70', 90'	Report	Baird (yellow card) 31'; Johnson (yellow card) 50'; Olsson (yellow card) 72'	Stadium: Griffin Park; Referee: Tim Robinson

17 April 2017 43	Derby County	1–1	Huddersfield Town	Derby
18:00 BST	Camara (yellow card) 77'; Butterfield 88'	Report	Quaner 9' van La Parra (yellow card) 45'; Hefele (yellow card) 85'	Stadium: iPro Stadium; Attendance: 29,031; Referee: Darren Bond

22 April 2017 44	Sheffield Wednesday	2–1	Derby County	Sheffield
15:00 BST	Reach (yellow card) 53'; Fletcher 58'; Hooper 64'	Report	Bent 48'; Hughes (yellow card) 57'	Stadium: Hillsborough Stadium; Attendance: 28,889; Referee: Paul Tierney

29 April 2017 45	Derby County	3–1	Wolverhampton Wanderers	Derby
15:00 BST	Nugent 12'; Johnson 29'; Bryson 57'; Pearce (yellow card) 62'	Report	Williamson (yellow card) 23'; Cavaleiro (red card) 33'; Marshall 45+1'	Stadium: iPro Stadium; Attendance: 31,051; Referee: Chris Kavanagh

7 May 2017 46	Rotherham United	1–1	Derby County	Rotherham
12:00 BST	Frecklington 66'	Report	Ince 84' (pen.)	Stadium: New York Stadium; Attendance: 10,763; Referee: Darren Deadman

=== FA Cup ===
7 January 2017 Third round	West Bromwich Albion	1–2	Derby County	West Bromwich
15:00 GMT	Phillips 35'; Morrison (yellow card) 53'	Report	Bent 51'; Ince 54' (yellow card) 90+5'; Johnson (yellow card) 90+2'	Stadium: The Hawthorns; Attendance: 25,288; Referee: Jonathan Moss

27 January 2017 Fourth round	Derby County	2–2	Leicester City	Derby
19:55 GMT	Bent 21'; Bryson 40'; Pearce (yellow card) 55'	Report	Bent 8' (o.g.); Morgan 86'	Stadium: iPro Stadium; Attendance: 25,079; Referee: Mark Clattenburg

8 February 2017 Fourth round replay	Leicester City	3–1 (a.e.t.)	Derby County	Leicester
19:45 GMT	Mendy (yellow card) 9'; King 47'; Musa (yellow card) 84'; Ndidi 95'; Gray 114'	Report	Christie (yellow card) 6'; Camara 62'	Stadium: King Power Stadium; Attendance: 31,648; Referee: Mike Jones

=== EFL Cup ===
9 August 2016 First round	Derby County	1–0	Grimsby Town	Derby
19:45 BST	Pearce (yellow card) 25'; Keogh 60'	Report		Stadium: Pride Park Stadium; Attendance: 11,692 (1,734 Grimsby supporters)

23 August 2016 Second round	Derby County	1–1 (a.e.t.) (14–13 p)	Carlisle United	Derby
19:45 BST	Bent 56'	Report	Jones 90+5'; Grainger (yellow card) 109'	Stadium: Pride Park Stadium; Attendance: 9,860 (611 Carlisle supporters)
	Penalties
	Ince (penalty scored); Blackman (penalty scored); Butterfield (penalty scored); Hughes (penalty missed); Keogh (penalty scored); Elšnik (penalty scored); Baird (penalty scored); Pearce (penalty missed); Lowe (penalty scored); Carson (penalty scored); Ince (penalty scored); Blackman (penalty scored); Butterfield (penalty scored); Hughes (penalty scored); Keogh (penalty scored); Elšnik (penalty scored)		Devitt (penalty scored); Jones (penalty scored); Joyce (penalty scored); Wyke (penalty missed); Grainger (penalty scored); McKee (penalty scored); Gillesphey (penalty scored); Ibehre (penalty missed); Miller (penalty scored); Raynes (penalty scored); Devitt (penalty scored); Jones (penalty scored); Joyce (penalty scored); Wyke (penalty scored); Grainger (penalty scored); McKee (penalty missed)

20 September 2016 Third Round	Derby County	0–3	Liverpool	Derby
19:45 BST	Johnson (yellow card) 77'; Hughes (yellow card) 79'		Klavan 24'; Moreno (yellow card) 45+2'; Coutinho 50'; Origi 54'; Grujić (yellow card) 76'	Stadium: iPro Stadium

== Statistics ==
=== Appearances and goals ===
No.	Pos	Nat	Player	Total		Championship		FA Cup		League Cup	
No.	Pos	Nat	Player	Apps	Goals	Apps	Goals	Apps	Goals	Apps	Goals
Goalkeepers
1	GK	(England) ENG	Scott Carson	50	0	46	0	2	0	2	0
35	GK	(England) ENG	Jonathan Mitchell	2	0	0	0	1	0	1	0
Defenders
2	DF	(Republic of Ireland) IRL	Cyrus Christie	30	1	24+3	1	1	0	2	0
3	DF	(Scotland) SCO	Craig Forsyth	4	1	3	1	0	0	1	0
5	DF	(England) ENG	Jason Shackell	10	0	7+1	0	2	0	0	0
6	DF	(Republic of Ireland) IRL	Richard Keogh	48	1	42	0	3	0	3	1
12	DF	(Northern Ireland) NIR	Chris Baird	37	0	28+5	0	2	0	2	0
16	DF	(Republic of Ireland) IRL	Alex Pearce	45	2	39+1	2	1+1	0	3	0
25	DF	(England) ENG	Max Lowe	12	0	8+1	0	1	0	1+1	0
26	DF	(England) ENG	Jamie Hanson	6	0	2+3	0	1	0	0	0
29	DF	(Sweden) SWE	Marcus Olsson	32	0	30	0	0	0	2	0
Midfielders
4	MF	(Scotland) SCO	Craig Bryson	37	3	23+11	2	2	1	1	0
8	MF	(Scotland) SCO	Ikechi Anya	28	1	14+12	1	1	0	0+1	0
15	MF	(England) ENG	Bradley Johnson	38	3	33	3	3	0	2	0
17	MF	(Belgium) BEL	Julien De Sart	11	1	8+1	1	2	0	0	0
18	MF	(England) ENG	Jacob Butterfield	45	1	34+6	1	1+1	0	2+1	0
19	MF	(England) ENG	Will Hughes	42	2	28+10	2	1	0	2+1	0
30	MF	(Slovenia) SLO	Timi Elšnik	2	0	0	0	0	0	0+2	0
Forwards
7	FW	(Scotland) SCO	Johnny Russell	39	2	29+7	2	1+1	0	1	0
10	FW	(England) ENG	Tom Ince	50	15	41+4	14	2	1	0+3	0
11	FW	(England) ENG	Darren Bent	42	13	22+15	10	2	2	3	1
20	FW	(Guinea) GUI	Abdoul Camara	17	1	3+10	0	2+1	1	1	0
22	FW	(England) ENG	Nick Blackman	12	1	2+7	1	1	0	2	0
23	FW	(Czech Republic) CZE	Matěj Vydra	36	5	20+13	5	0+3	0	0	0
28	FW	(England) ENG	David Nugent	18	6	11+6	6	0+1	0	0	0
38	FW	(England) ENG	Mason Bennett	2	0	0+2	0	0	0	0	0
Players transferred or loaned out during the season
8	MF	(Republic of Ireland) IRL	Jeff Hendrick	2	0	2	0	0	0	0	0
9	FW	(Scotland) SCO	Chris Martin	6	0	3+2	0	0	0	1	0
14	FW	(England) ENG	James Wilson	4	0	3+1	0	0	0	0	0
24	FW	(Austria) AUT	Andi Weimann	12	0	1+10	0	0	0	1	0
48	FW	(England) ENG	Charles Vernam	1	0	0	0	0+1	0	0	0

Last updated: 30 June 2017
Source: Competitions
