= 2016–17 Coventry City F.C. season =

Coventry City
2016–17 season
- Chairman: Tim Fisher
- Manager: Tony Mowbray (until 29 September); Russell Slade (until 5 March); Mark Robins (from 6 March)
- Stadium: Ricoh Arena
- League One: 23rd (relegated)
- FA Cup: Second round vs Cambridge United
- EFL Cup: Second round vs Norwich City
- EFL Trophy: Winners vs Oxford United
- Top goalscorer: League: George Thomas 5 All: George Thomas 9
- Highest home attendance: 11,946 vs Bristol Rovers (25 March 2017)
- Lowest home attendance: 7,466 vs Southend United (14 March 2017)
- Average home league attendance: 9,111
- Biggest win: 2–0 vs Port Vale (1 October 2016); 2–0 vs Rochdale (22 October 2016); 2–0 vs Chesterfield (1 November 2016)
- Biggest defeat: 3–0 vs Charlton Athletic (15 October 2016); 4–1 vs Oxford United (19 November 2016); 4–1 vs Bristol Rovers (26 December 2016); 3–0 vs Northampton Town (28 January 2017)
Home colours	Away colours
- All statistics correct as of 30 April 2017.

The 2016–17 season is Coventry City's 133rd season in their existence and fifth consecutive in the English third tier, League One. Along with competing in League One, the club participated in three cup competitions: FA Cup, EFL Cup and EFL Trophy.

The season covers the period between 1 July 2016 and 30 June 2017.

== Review and events ==
=== July ===
Réda Johnson, Marc-Antoine Fortuné, Conor Thomas, Aaron Martin, Martin Lorentzson, Jim O'Brien, Aaron Phillips, Peter Ramage, Stephen Hunt and Darius Henderson are all released following the end of their contracts.

== Competitions ==
=== Preseason friendlies ===
On 24 May 2016, Coventry City announced they will visit National League North side Nuneaton Town on 9 July. Three days later, the Sky Blues announced they will face Championship side Norwich City on 26 July. On 24 June, Coventry announced their full pre-season schedule.

On 10 July 2016, Coventry City confirmed they will play Ettifaq on Saturday 16, July. Three days later, the club announced a change to the friendly against the Saudi Arabian side and instead will now play Sturm Graz.

9 July 2016	Nuneaton Town	1–2	Coventry City	Nuneaton
15:00 (BST)	Shorthouse 79'	Report	Lameiras 37'; De. Kelly-Evans 44'	Stadium: Liberty Way; Attendance: 1,675

16 July 2016	Sturm Graz (Austria)	3–2	Coventry City	Jennersdorf, Austria
11:00 CEST	Stanković 8' 20'; Hierländer 80'	Report	Tudgay 88' 90'	Stadium: Freizeitzentrum

19 July 2016	Rugby Town	1–2	Coventry City XI	Rugby
19:30	Kolodynski 2'	Report	Spence 20'; Thomas 40'	Stadium: Butlin Road; Attendance: 631

23 July 2016	Newport County	0–2	Coventry City	Newport
15:00		Report	Thomas 43'; Willis 55'	Stadium: Newport Stadium; Attendance: 869

26 July 2015	Norwich City	3–0	Coventry City	Norwich
19:30 BST	Hoolahan 9'; Jo. Murphy 66'; Ja. Murphy 86'	Report		Stadium: Carrow Road; Attendance: 7,602

29 July 2016	Coventry City	Cancelled	Doncaster Rovers	Nuneaton
19:30		Report		Stadium: Liberty Way

29 July 2016	Nuneaton Town	1–3	Coventry City	Nuneaton
19:30	McDonald 84'	Report	Lameiras 3'; Di Kelly-Evans 6'; Tudgay 70'	Stadium: Liberty Way

=== League One ===
==== League table ====
Pos	Team	Pld	W	D	L	GF	GA	GD	Pts	Promotion, qualification or relegation
20	Gillingham	46	12	14	20	59	79	−20	50	
21	Port Vale (R)	46	12	13	21	45	70	−25	49	Relegation to EFL League Two
22	Swindon Town (R)	46	11	11	24	44	66	−22	44	Relegation to EFL League Two
23	Coventry City (R)	46	9	12	25	37	68	−31	39	Relegation to EFL League Two
24	Chesterfield (R)	46	9	10	27	43	78	−35	37	Relegation to EFL League Two

Source: BBC Sport
Rules for classification: 1) Points; 2) Goal difference; 3) Number of goals scored
(R) Relegated

==== Results summary ====
Overall								Home						Away					
Pld	W	D	L	GF	GA	GD	Pts	W	D	L	GF	GA	GD	W	D	L	GF	GA	GD
46	9	12	25	37	68	−31	39	8	7	8	22	24	−2	1	5	17	15	44	−29

Last updated: 30 April 2017.

==== Results by matchday ====
Matchday	1	2	3	4	5	6	7	8	9	10	11	12	13	14	15	16	17	18	19	20	21	22	23	24	25	26	27	28	29	30	31	32	33	34	35	36	37	38	39	40	41	42	43	44	45	46
Ground	A	H	H	A	H	A	A	H	A	H	A	A	H	H	A	H	H	A	A	H	A	H	A	A	H	A	H	A	H	A	A	H	H	A	A	H	H	A	H	H	A	H	H	A	H	A
Result	L	D	D	L	D	L	D	D	L	D	W	L	W	W	D	W	L	L	L	L	L	L	L	D	D	L	L	L	L	L	D	W	L	L	D	L	L	L	W	W	L	W	D	L	W	L
Position	17	18	18	21	22	23	23	24	24	24	23	24	23	21	19	18	18	19	20	21	21	21	23	23	22	24	24	24	24	24	24	24	24	24	24	24	24	24	24	24	24	24	24	24	23	23

Updated to match(es) played on 30 April 2017. Source: Statto.com
A = Away; H = Home; W = Win; D = Draw; L = Loss

==== Results ====
On 22 June 2016, the fixtures for the 2016–17 season were announced.

6 August 2016 1	Swindon Town	1–0	Coventry City	Swindon
15:00	Kasim 86'; Sendles-White (yellow card) 53'	Report	Sordell (yellow card) 32'; Haynes (yellow card) 52'	Stadium: County Ground; Attendance: 9,023; Referee: Darren Handley

13 August 2016 2	Coventry City	0–0	Shrewsbury Town	Coventry
15:00	Ricketts (yellow card) 51'; Stevenson (yellow card) 58'; Harries (yellow card) 64'; Gadzhev (yellow card) 68'	Report	Riley (yellow card) 12'; Dodds (yellow card) 45'; El-Abd (yellow card) 49'; Toney (yellow card) 90+4'	Stadium: Ricoh Arena; Attendance: 10,296 (530 away)

16 August 2016 3	Coventry City	0–0	Bury	Coventry
19:45		Report	Etuhu (yellow card) 39'; Soares (yellow card) 66'	Stadium: Ricoh Arena; Attendance: 9,096 (222)

20 August 2016 4	Bradford City	3–1	Coventry City	Bradford
15:00	McMahon 67' (pen.), 75' (pen.); Marshall 69'	Report	Agyei 13'; Turnbull (red card) 66'	Stadium: Valley Parade; Attendance: 17,595 (570)

27 August 2016 5	Coventry City	1–1	Northampton Town	Coventry
15:00	Sordell (yellow card) 51'; Tudgay 63'; Bigirimana (yellow card) 74'; McCann (yellow card) 81'	Report	Beautyman 30' (yellow card) 63'; Moloney (yellow card) 34'; O'Toole (yellow card) 43'; Buchanan (yellow card) 66'; Revell (yellow card) 90+2'	Stadium: Ricoh Arena; Attendance: 10,022 (1,608)

3 September 2016 6	Fleetwood Town	2–0	Coventry City	Fleetwood
15:00	Long 58'; Woolford 71'	Report	Harries (yellow card) 70'	Stadium: Highbury Stadium; Attendance: 3,557

10 September 2016 7	Millwall	1–1	Coventry City	South Bermondsey
15:00	O'Brien 71'; Martin (yellow card) 78'	Report	Sordell 23'; Sterry (yellow card) 90+1'	Stadium: The Den; Attendance: 8,755 (730)

17 September 2016 8	Coventry City	0–0	Oldham Athletic	Coventry
15:00	Gadzhev (yellow card) 45'; Bigirimana (yellow card) 62'	Report	Green (yellow card) 41'; Dunne (yellow card) 64'	Stadium: Ricoh Arena; Attendance: 8,813 (453 away)

24 September 2016 9	Gillingham	2–1	Coventry City	Gillingham
15:00	Ehmer 26'; Knott 72'	Report	Reid 21'; Dion Kelly-Evans (yellow card) 29'; Bigirimana (yellow card) 58'	Stadium: Priestfield Stadium; Attendance: 7,664 (380)

28 September 2016 10	Coventry City	2–2	AFC Wimbledon	Coventry
19:45	Sordell 2' (yellow card) 90+8'; Willis (yellow card) 72'; McCann (yellow card) 81'; Wright 90+4'	Report	Meades 37'; Robinson (yellow card) 55'; Taylor 83'	Stadium: Ricoh Arena; Attendance: 8,030; Referee: Mark Heywood

1 October 2016 11	Port Vale	0–2	Coventry City	Stoke-on-Trent
15:00	Streete (yellow card) 20'; Paulo Tavares (yellow card) 62'; Hart (yellow card) 77'	Report	Sordell (yellow card) 33' (goal) 36'; McCann (yellow card) 43' (goal) 72'; Sterry (yellow card) 45+1'	Stadium: Vale Park; Attendance: 5,605; Referee: John Busby

15 October 2016 12	Charlton Athletic	3–0	Coventry City	Charlton, London
15:00 BST	Holmes 32' (yellow card) 83'; Lookman 78'; Magennis 88'	Report	McCann (yellow card) 41'	Stadium: The Valley; Attendance: 11,406; Referee: Darren Deadman

18 October 2016 13	Coventry City	2–1	Oxford United	Coventry
19:45	Stevenson 28' (yellow card) 55'; Sordell 43'; Sterry (yellow card) 57'	Report	Taylor (yellow card) 37'; Ruffles (yellow card) 90+1'; Crowley 90+2'	Stadium: Ricoh Arena; Attendance: 9,912; Referee: Robert Jones

22 October 2016 14	Coventry City	2–0	Rochdale	Coventry
15:00 BST	Agyei 28'; Turnbull (yellow card) 38'; Wright 84'	Report	Lund (yellow card) 66'	Stadium: City of Coventry Stadium; Attendance: 8,133; Referee: Richard Clark

29 October 2016 15	Walsall	1–1	Coventry City	Walsall
15:00 BST	Edwards (yellow card) 1'; Laird (yellow card) 40'; Oztumer (yellow card) 67' (goal) 76'	Report	Rose 36'; Bigirimana (yellow card) 44'; Turnbull (yellow card) 72'; Page (yellow card) 85'	Stadium: The Banks's Stadium; Attendance: 6,719; Referee: Dean Whitestone

1 November 2016 16	Coventry City	2–0	Chesterfield	Coventry
19:45	Willis 69'; Rose 81'; Bigirimana (yellow card) 85'; Page (red card) 90+3'	Report	Evatt (yellow card) 88'; Liddle (yellow card) 89'	Stadium: Ricoh Arena; Attendance: 7,941; Referee: John Brooks

12 November 2016 17	Coventry City	0–1	Scunthorpe United	Coventry
15:00 GMT	Turnbull (yellow card) 68'; Rúben Lameiras (yellow card) 90+2'	Report	Morris 55'; Holmes (yellow card) 60'; Goode (yellow card) 66'	Stadium: Ricoh Arena; Attendance: 9,737; Referee: Jonathan Moss

19 November 2016 18	Oxford United	4–1	Coventry City	Oxford
15:00 GMT	Hemmings 7'; Ledson (yellow card) 30'; Sterry 30' (o.g.); Maguire 36' (pen.); Hall (yellow card) 37'; Skarz (yellow card) 43'; MacDonald 60'	Report	Tudgay 90+5' (pen.)	Stadium: The Kassam Stadium; Attendance: 9,199; Referee: Darren England

22 November 2016 19	Bolton Wanderers	1–0	Coventry City	Bolton
20:00 GMT	Clough 11'; Beevers (yellow card) 56'	Report	Sterry (yellow card) 60'; Sordell (yellow card) 67'	Stadium: Macron Stadium; Attendance: 12,290; Referee: Seb Stockbridge

26 November 2016 20	Coventry City	1–2	Milton Keynes Dons	Coventry
15:00 GMT	Stevenson 38' (red card) 74'; Kelly-Evans (yellow card) 77'; Jones (yellow card) 78'; Maycock (yellow card) 90+5'	Report	Upson 35', 80'; Aneke (yellow card) 90+4'	Stadium: Ricoh Arena; Attendance: 9,640; Referee: Andrew Davies

10 December 2016 21	Southend United	3–1	Coventry City	Southend-on-Sea
15:00 GMT	Wordsworth 6'; Ferdinand 64'; McLaughlin 69'	Report	McCann (yellow card) 12'; Willis (yellow card) 60'; Kelly-Evans (yellow card) 64'; Agyei 89'	Stadium: Roots Hall Stadium; Attendance: 6,430; Referee: Dean Whitestone

15 December 2016 22	Coventry City	1–2	Sheffield United	Coventry
19:45 GMT	Agyei 51'; Turnbull (yellow card) 82'; Sordell (yellow card) 90'	Report	Sharp 23', 87'	Stadium: Ricoh Arena; Attendance: 8,801; Referee: David Webb

26 December 2016 23	Bristol Rovers	4–1	Coventry City	Bristol
15:00 GMT	Hartley 18'; Bodin (yellow card) 35' (goal) 54', 74', 83' (pen.); Clarke (yellow card) 58'	Report	Turnbull (yellow card) 18'; Willis 57'; Reid (yellow card) 72'; Page (yellow card) 78'	Stadium: Memorial Stadium; Attendance: 11,200; Referee: Brendan Malone

31 December 2016 24	Peterborough United	1–1	Coventry City	Peterborough
15:00	Lopes (yellow card) 44'; Bostwick (yellow card) 82' (goal) 90+3'	Report	Willis 19'; Tudgay (yellow card) 45'	Stadium: London Road Stadium; Attendance: 5,866; Referee: John Brooks

2 January 2017 25	Coventry City	2–2	Bolton Wanderers	Coventry
15:00 GMT	Tudgay 37'; Haynes (yellow card) 66'; Beavon 69'	Report	Clough 67' (pen.); Clayton 90+1'	Stadium: Ricoh Arena; Attendance: 8,397; Referee: Carl Boyeson

14 January 2017 26	Chesterfield	1–0	Coventry City	Chesterfield
15:00 GMT	Gardner 77'; Evans (yellow card) 83'	Report	Haynes (yellow card) 90+6'; Beavon (yellow card) 90+11'	Stadium: Proact Stadium; Attendance: 5,896; Referee: Nick Kinseley

21 January 2017 27	Coventry City	0–1	Fleetwood Town	Coventry
15:00 GMT	Clarke (yellow card) 56'	Report	Bolger (yellow card) 58' (goal) 90'; McLaughlin (yellow card) 73'	Stadium: Ricoh Arena; Attendance: 8,129; Referee: Darren Deadman

28 January 2017 28	Northampton Town	3–0	Coventry City	Northampton
15:00 GMT	Anderson 53', 64', 76'	Report	Willis (red card) 19'	Stadium: Sixfields Stadium; Attendance: 7,543; Referee: Lee Probert

4 February 2017 29	Coventry City	0–2	Millwall	Coventry
15:00 GMT		Report	Cooper 33'; Webster (yellow card) 69'; Morison 79'	Stadium: Ricoh Arena; Attendance: 8,764; Referee: Mark Heywood

11 February 2017 30	Oldham Athletic	3–2	Coventry City	Oldham
15:00 GMT	Foley 8' (o.g.); Clarke 66'; McLaughlin 70'	Report	Tudgay 9'; Gadzhev (yellow card) 21'; Rawson (yellow card) 67'; Thomas 76'	Stadium: Boundary Park; Attendance: 3,766; Referee: Ben Toner

14 February 2017 31	AFC Wimbledon	1–1	Coventry City	Kingston upon Thames, London
19:45 GMT	Robinson 90+3'	Report	Jones 71'	Stadium: Kingsmeadow; Attendance: 4,022; Referee: Gavin Ward

18 February 2017 32	Coventry City	2–1	Gillingham	Coventry
15:00 GMT	K. Thomas 16'; G. Thomas 21'	Report	Oshilaja (yellow card) 19'; Byrne (yellow card) 51'; Herd (yellow card) 53'; Ehmer 55'; Garmston (yellow card) 88'	Stadium: Ricoh Arena; Attendance: 8,718; Referee: Michael Salisbury

25 February 2017 33	Coventry City	1–3	Swindon Town	Coventry
15:00	Foley (yellow card) 84'; Thomas 90+1'	Report	Ajose 32', 71'; Obika 38'; Colkett (yellow card) 59'; Barry (yellow card) 76'; Thomas (yellow card) 90+5'	Stadium: Ricoh Arena; Attendance: 9,543; Referee: Graham Salisbury

28 February 2017 34	Bury	2–1	Coventry City	Bury
19:45	Vaughan 16'; Pope 40'	Report	Beavon 65'; Kelly-Evans (yellow card) 73'	Stadium: Gigg Lane; Attendance: 2,611; Referee: Scott Duncan

4 March 2017 35	Shrewsbury Town	0–0	Coventry City	Shrewsbury
15:00	Rodman (yellow card) 45+11'; Yates (yellow card) 54'; Deegan (yellow card) 87'	Report	Jones (yellow card) 86'	Stadium: New Meadow; Attendance: 6,205; Referee: Robert Jones

11 March 2017 36	Coventry City	0–2	Bradford City	Coventry
15:00		Report	Jones 51'; Hiwula 56'	Stadium: Ricoh Arena; Attendance: 9,150; Referee: John Brooks

14 March 2017 37	Coventry City	0–2	Southend United	Coventry
19:45	Kelly-Evans (yellow card) 52'	Report	Ranger 2'; Leonard 23'	Stadium: Ricoh Arena; Attendance: 7,646; Referee: John Busby

18 March 2017 38	Milton Keynes Dons	1–0	Coventry City	Denbigh
15:00	Walsh (yellow card) 35'; O'Keefe 51'	Report		Stadium: Stadium mk Attendance: 9,060; Referee: Eddie Ilderton

21 March 2017 39	Coventry City	2–1	Port Vale	Coventry
19:45	Reid 37'; Thomas 41'; Rawson (yellow card) 90+3'	Report	Reeves (yellow card) 45+1'; Smith 74'; Foley (yellow card) 78'	Stadium: Ricoh Arena; Attendance: 7,695; Referee: David Webb

25 March 2017 40	Coventry City	1–0	Bristol Rovers	Coventry
15:00	Thomas 80'; Bigirimana (yellow card) 90+5'	Report	Lockyer (yellow card) 37'; Leadbitter (yellow card) 65'	Stadium: Ricoh Arena; Attendance: 11,946; Referee: Graham Horwood

5 April 2017 41	Sheffield United	2–0	Coventry City	Sheffield
20:00	Clarke 70'; Fleck 75'	Report	Bigirimana (yellow card) 36'	Stadium: Bramall Lane; Attendance: 24,334; Referee: Ross Joyce

8 April 2017 42	Coventry City	1–0	Peterborough United	Coventry
15:00	Lameiras 51'; Foley (yellow card) 82'	Report	Baldwin (yellow card) 90'	Stadium: Ricoh Arena; Attendance: 10,551; Referee: Gavin Ward

14 April 2017 43	Coventry City	1–1	Charlton Athletic	Coventry
15:00	Thomas 28'; Jones (yellow card) 71'; Stevenson (yellow card) 82'	Report	Bauer 54'; Crofts (yellow card) 60'	Stadium: Ricoh Arena; Attendance: 9,479; Referee: Darren Handley

17 April 2017 44	Rochdale	2–0	Coventry City	Rochdale
15:00 BST	Henderson 18', 52'; Rafferty (yellow card) 22'	Report	Bigirimana (yellow card) 45'	Stadium: Spotland Stadium; Attendance: 3,202; Referee: Nigel Miller

22 April 2017 45	Coventry City	1–0	Walsall	Coventry
15:00	Thomas 39'	Report	O'Connell (yellow card) 54' (yellow-red card) 70'	Stadium: Ricoh Arena; Attendance: 9,284; Referee: Darren Drysdale

30 April 2017 46	Scunthorpe United	3–1	Coventry City	Scunthorpe
12:00	van Veen 52'; Bishop 85'; Townsend (yellow card) 88'; Adelakun 89'	Report	Camwell (yellow card) 35'; Gadzhev 36'	Stadium: Glanford Park; Attendance: 5796; Referee: Richard Clark

=== FA Cup ===
6 November 2016 First round	Morecambe	1–1	Coventry City	Morecambe
14:00 GMT	Winnard 59'; Whitmore (yellow card) 77'; Murphy (yellow card) 90'	Report	Sterry 72' (yellow card) 79'; Lameiras (yellow card) 90+1'	Stadium: Globe Arena; Attendance: 1,732; Referee: Andy Haines

15 November 2016 First round replay	Coventry City	2–1	Morecambe	Coventry
19:45 GMT	Sordell 39', 57'	Report	Winnard 10'; Jennings (yellow card) 86'	Stadium: Ricoh Arena; Attendance: 2,175; Referee: Mark Haywood

4 December 2016 Second round	Cambridge United	4–0	Coventry City	Cambridge
14:00 GMT	Berry 7', 29' (pen.), 38', 86'	Report	Maycock (yellow card) 43'; Turnbull (yellow card) 84'; Gadzhev (yellow card) 90+2'	Stadium: The R Costings Abbey Stadium; Attendance: 4,283; Referee: Keith Stroud

=== EFL Cup ===
The draw for the first round was made on 22 June 2016, via a live stream on Facebook. Coventry City were drawn at home to League Two side Portsmouth.

9 August 2016 Round 1	Coventry City	3–2 (a.e.t.)	Portsmouth	Coventry
19:45	Haynes 60'; Gadzhev 82' (yellow card) 20'; Rose 116'; Stevenson (yellow card) 83'; Lameiras (yellow card) 120+1'	Report	Main 20' (pen.); Naismith 85' (yellow card) 86'	Stadium: Ricoh Arena; Referee: Andrew Madley

23 August 2016 Round 2	Norwich City	6–1	Coventry City	Norwich
19:45	Lafferty 25'; Tenés 36', 80'; Thompson (yellow card) 42'; Martin 58'; Murphy 63'; Godfrey 86'	Report	Lameiras 56' (pen.)	Stadium: Carrow Road; Attendance: 10,105

=== EFL Trophy ===
The 2016–17 EFL Trophy group stage draw was made on 27 July 2016. Coventry City faced Northampton Town, Wycombe Wanderers and West Ham United Academy during this phase of the competition.

Pos	Div	Team	Pld	W	PW	PL	L	GF	GA	GD	Pts	Qualification
1	L1	Coventry City	3	3	0	0	0	11	5	+6	9	Advance to Round 2
2	L2	Wycombe Wanderers	3	2	0	0	1	8	4	+4	6	Advance to Round 2
3	ACA	West Ham United U21	3	0	1	0	2	3	8	−5	2	
4	L1	Northampton Town	3	0	0	1	2	2	7	−5	1	

Source: Sky Sports

30 August 2016 Group Stage	Coventry City	4–2	West Ham United Academy	Coventry
19:45 BST	McCann (yellow card) 30'; Turnbull 35', 75' (yellow card) 90+4'; Lameiras 48'; Kelly-Evans (yellow card) 52' (yellow-red card) 88'; Willis 73'	Report	Martínez 32', 90+1'; Lewis (yellow card) 43'; Neufville (yellow card) 52'; Browne (yellow card) 54'	Stadium: Ricoh Arena; Attendance: 2,091

4 October 2016 Group Stage	Coventry City	3–1	Northampton Town	Coventry
19:45 BST	Agyei 1'; Jones 8'; Lameiras 66'	Report	Richards 2'	Stadium: Ricoh Arena; Attendance: 2,085

9 November 2016 Group Stage	Wycombe Wanderers	2–4	Coventry City	High Wycombe
19:45	McGinn 32'; Kashket 53'	Report	Haynes 57', 60'; Thomas 63'; Bigirimana 86'; Harries (yellow card) 88'	Stadium: Adams Park; Attendance: 912; Referee: Charles Breakspear

7 December 2016 Second round	Coventry City	1–0	Crawley Town	Coventry
19:45 GMT	Sordell 28'; Turnbull (yellow card) 45'	Report		Stadium: Ricoh Arena; Attendance: 1,338; Referee: Graham Horwood

10 January 2017 Third round	Coventry City	3–0	Brighton & Hove Albion Academy	Coventry
19:45 GMT	Lameiras 41'; Thomas 51'; Haynes 88'	Report		Stadium: Ricoh Arena; Attendance: 2,085; Referee: Rob Lewis

24 January 2017 Quarter-final	Swansea City Academy	1–1 (2–4 p)	Coventry City	Swansea
19:30 GMT	Maric (yellow card) 61'; McBurnie 70' (pen.)	Report	Haynes (yellow card) 41'; Maric 85' (o.g.)	Stadium: Liberty Stadium; Attendance: 3,356; Referee: Mark Haywood
	Penalties
	Lewis (penalty scored); Biabi (penalty missed); Byers (penalty scored); Blair (penalty missed)		Thomas (penalty scored); Bigirimana (penalty scored); Reid (penalty scored); Lameiras (penalty scored)

7 February 2017 Semi-final	Coventry City	2–1	Wycombe Wanderers	Coventry
19:30 GMT	Beavon 11'; Thomas 19'; Kelly-Evans (yellow card) 78'; Tudgay (yellow card) 90'	Report	Akinfenwa 55'	Stadium: Ricoh Arena; Attendance: 11,672; Referee: Darren England

2 April 2017 Final	Coventry City	2–1	Oxford United	London
14:30 GMT	Bigirimana 11' (yellow card) 39'; Thomas 55'	Report	Dunkley (yellow card) 63'; Sercombe 75' (yellow card) 86'	Stadium: Wembley Stadium; Attendance: 74,434; Referee: Chris Sarginson

=== Birmingham Senior Cup ===
5 October 2016 First round	Alvechurch FC	1–3	Coventry City	Alvechurch
19.45 BST	Spencer 58'; Sauane (yellow card) 57'		Kelly-Evans 9'; Shipley 18', 51'	Stadium: Lye Meadow; Referee: Jack Shepherd

5 December 2016 Second round	Stratford Town	2–0	Coventry City	Stratford-upon-Avon
TBC BST	Ahenkorah 29'; Gregory 51'			Stadium: The DCS Stadium; Attendance: 131

== Squad information ==
=== Squad details ===
No.	Name	Position	Nationality	Place of birth	Date of birth (age) *	Club apps *	Club goals *	Signed from	Date signed	Fee	Contract End
Goalkeepers
1	Lee Burge	GK	(England)	Hereford	9 January 1993 (aged 23)	32	0	Academy	1 June 2010	Trainee	30 June 2017
23	Reice Charles-Cook	GK	(England)	Lewisham	8 April 1994 (aged 22)	39	0	Bury	1 August 2014	Free	30 June 2018
34	Corey Addai	GK	(England)	London	10 October 1997 (aged 18)	0	0	Academy	1 June 2014	Trainee	30 June 2018
Defenders
2	Jordan Willis	CB	(England)	Coventry	24 August 1994 (aged 21)	81	0	Academy	1 June 2011	Trainee	30 June 2018
3	Chris Stokes	LB	(England)	Frome	8 March 1991 (aged 25)	54	3	Forest Green Rovers	21 February 2015	Free	30 June 2017
4	Jordan Turnbull	CB	(England)	Trowbridge	30 October 1994 (aged 21)	0	0	Southampton	15 August 2016	Undisclosed	30 June 2019
7	Nathan Clarke	CB	(England)	Halifax	30 July 1983 (aged 32)	0	0	Bradford City	1 January 2017	Free	30 June 2017
19	Farrend Rawson	CB	(England)	Nottingham	11 July 1996 (aged 19)	0	0	Derby County	17 January 2017	Loan	30 June 2017
21	Kevin Foley	RB	(Republic of Ireland) (England)	Luton	1 November 1984 (aged 31)	0	0	Charlton Athletic	6 January 2017	Free	30 June 2017
24	Ryan Haynes	LB	(England)	Northampton	27 September 1995 (aged 20)	45	1	Academy	27 March 2013	Trainee	30 June 2017
29	Cian Harries	CB	(Wales) (England)	Solihull	1 April 1997 (aged 19)	1	0	Academy	1 June 2014	Trainee	30 June 2020
30	Dion Kelly-Evans	RB	(England)	Coventry	21 September 1996 (aged 19)	1	0	Academy	1 June 2014	Trainee	30 June 2017
37	Jacob Whitmore	CB	(England)	Coventry	6 May 1998 (aged 18)	0	0	Academy	1 July 2016	Trainee	30 June 2017
38	Darragh Leahy	LB	(Republic of Ireland)	Dublin	15 April 1998 (aged 18)	0	0	Academy	1 July 2016	Trainee	30 June 2018
Midfielders
5	Gaël Bigirimana	CM	(Burundi) (England)	Bujumbura	22 October 1993 (aged 22)	41	0	Newcastle United	26 August 2016	Undisclosed	30 June 2017
6	Andy Rose	CM	(England) (Australia)	Melbourne	13 February 1990 (aged 26)	12	2	(United States) Seattle Sounders FC	2 January 2016	Free	30 June 2017
8	Rúben Lameiras	RW	(Portugal)	Lisbon	22 December 1994 (aged 21)	32	2	Tottenham Hotspur	24 July 2015	Free	30 June 2017
10	Jodi Jones	RW	(England)	Bow	22 October 1997 (aged 18)	6	0	Dagenham & Redbridge	10 May 2016	Undisclosed	30 June 2020
11	Kyel Reid	LM	(England) (Jamaica)	Deptford	26 November 1987 (aged 28)	0	0	Preston North End	28 July 2016	Free	30 June 2018
12	Callum Reilly	CM	(Republic of Ireland)	Warrington	3 October 1993 (aged 22)	0	0	Burton Albion	1 January 2017	Loan	30 June 2017
13	Vladimir Gadzhev	CM	(Bulgaria)	Pazardzhik	18 July 1987 (aged 28)	2	0	(Bulgaria) Levski Sofia	24 March 2016	Free	30 June 2017
25	Jack Finch	DM	(England)	Fenny Compton	6 August 1996 (aged 19)	21	0	Academy	1 April 2014	Trainee	30 June 2017
28	Devon Kelly-Evans	LM	(England)	Coventry	21 September 1996 (aged 19)	0	0	Academy	1 June 2014	Trainee	30 June 2017
31	Ben Stevenson	CM	(England)	Leicester	23 March 1997 (aged 19)	0	0	Academy	1 July 2015	Trainee	30 June 2020
32	Kyle Spence	LM	(Scotland) (England)	Croydon	14 January 1997 (aged 19)	1	0	Unattached	15 February 2016	Free	30 June 2017
33	Bilal Sayoud	AM	(England)	London	5 May 1997 (aged 19)	0	0	Nike Academy	24 March 2016	Free	30 June 2018
35	Callum Maycock	CM	(England)	Birmingham	23 December 1997 (aged 18)	0	0	Academy	1 July 2016	Trainee	30 June 2018
36	Jordan Shipley	CM	(England)	Coventry	26 September 1997 (aged 18)	0	0	Academy	1 July 2016	Trainee	30 June 2018
Forwards
9	Charles Vernam	CF	(England)	London	8 October 1996 (aged 19)	0	0	Derby County	23 January 2017	Loan	30 June 2017
14	Kwame Thomas	CF	(England)	Nottingham	28 September 1995 (aged 20)	0	0	Derby County	1 July 2016	Free	30 June 2018
16	Stuart Beavon	CF	(England)	Reading	5 May 1984 (aged 32)	0	0	Burton Albion	1 January 2017	Free	30 June 2018
17	Michael Folivi	CF	(England)	London	25 February 1998 (aged 18)	0	0	Watford	31 January 2017	Loan	30 June 2017
20	Marcus Tudgay	CF	(England)	Shoreham-by-Sea	3 February 1983 (aged 33)	50	9	Nottingham Forest	29 July 2014	Free	30 June 2017
27	George Thomas	FW	(Wales) (England)	Leicester	24 March 1997 (aged 19)	17	0	Academy	25 October 2013	Trainee	30 June 2017
Left before the end of the season
9	Dan Agyei	CF	(England) (Ghana)	London	1 June 1997 (aged 19)	0	0	Burnley	18 August 2016	Loan	3 January 2017
12	Chris McCann	DM	(Republic of Ireland)	Dublin	21 July 1987 (aged 28)	0	0	(United States) Atlanta United FC	2 August 2016	Loan	31 December 2016
15	Lewis Page	LB	(England)	Enfield	20 May 1996 (aged 20)	0	0	West Ham United	9 August 2016	Loan	5 January 2017
17	Marvin Sordell	CF	(England)	Harrow	17 February 1991 (aged 25)	0	0	Colchester United	4 July 2016	Free	30 June 2017
18	Sam Ricketts	CB	(Wales) (England)	Aylesbury	11 October 1981 (aged 34)	46	1	Wolverhampton Wanderers	6 July 2015	Free	30 June 2017
19	Jack McBean	CF	(United States) (Scotland)	Newport Beach	15 December 1994 (aged 21)	0	0	(United States) LA Galaxy	19 August 2016	Loan	5 January 2017
21	Andre Wright	FW	(England)	Sandwell	7 December 1996 (aged 19)	0	0	West Bromwich Albion	31 August 2016	Loan	5 January 2017
22	Jamie Sterry	RB	(England)	Newcastle upon Tyne	21 November 1995 (aged 20)	0	0	Newcastle United	31 August 2016	Loan	4 January 2017
22	Yakubu	CF	(Nigeria)	Benin City	22 November 1982 (aged 33)	0	0	(Turkey) Kayserispor	13 February 2017	Free	5 April 2017
26	Ivor Lawton	CM	(England)	Coventry	5 September 1995 (aged 20)	1	0	Academy	26 November 2013	Trainee	31 December 2016

* Player age and appearances/goals for the club as of beginning of 2016–17 season.

=== Appearances ===
Correct as of match played on 30 April 2017

No.	Nat.	Player	Pos.	League One	FA Cup	EFL Cup	EFL Trophy	Total
1	(England)	Lee Burge	GK	33	3		3	39
2	(England)	Jordan Willis	DF	36	3	2	5	46
3	(England)	Chris Stokes	DF	5+2			2	9
4	(England)	Jordan Turnbull	DF	36	3		7	46
5	(Burundi)	Gaël Bigirimana	MF	28+2	2		5+2	39
6	(England)	Andy Rose	MF	19+2	1+1	1	4	28
7	(England)	Nathan Clarke	DF	18				18
8	(Portugal)	Rúben Lameiras	MF	14+13	2	1+1	5+1	37
9	(England)	Charles Vernam	FW	3+1				4
10	(England)	Jodi Jones	MF	11+23	1+1	0+1	3+5	45
11	(England)	Kyel Reid	MF	19+10	2+1	1+1	3	37
12	(Republic of Ireland)	Callum Reilly	MF	17+1			2	20
13	(Bulgaria)	Vladimir Gadzhev	MF	13+1	2	2	2+2	22
14	(England)	Kwame Thomas	FW	8+6				14
16	(England)	Stuart Beavon	FW	13+1			3	17
17	(England)	Michael Folivi	FW	0+1				1
19	(England)	Farrend Rawson	DF	12+2				14
20	(England)	Marcus Tudgay	FW	21+7		1	1+5	35
21	(Republic of Ireland)	Kevin Foley	DF	11+1				12
23	(England)	Reice Charles-Cook	GK	13+2		2	5	22
24	(England)	Ryan Haynes	DF	17+2	1	1	5+1	27
25	(England)	Jack Finch	MF			0+1	1+2	4
27	(Wales)	George Thomas	FW	23+5	0+1	1	6	36
28	(England)	Devon Kelly-Evans	MF			0+1		1
29	(Wales)	Cian Harries	DF	6+2	2	2	4	16
30	(England)	Dion Kelly-Evans	DF	13+12	1	1	5+1	33
31	(England)	Ben Stevenson	MF	22+6	1+1	2	2+2	36
32	(Scotland)	Kyle Spence	MF	0+1		0+1		2
33	(England)	Bilal Sayoud	MF					
34	(England)	Corey Addai	GK					
35	(England)	Callum Maycock	MF	0+2	1+2		1+1	7
36	(England)	Jordan Shipley	MF	0+1				1
37	(England)	Jacob Whitmore	DF					
38	(Republic of Ireland)	Darragh Leahy	DF					
41	(England)	Chris Camwell	DF	1				1
42	(England)	Jordon Thompson	DF					
Left before the end of the season
9	(England)	Dan Agyei	FW	12+4		1	2	19
12	(Republic of Ireland)	Chris McCann	MF	13	0+1	1	3	18
15	(England)	Lewis Page	DF	22	1	1	2	26
17	(England)	Marvin Sordell	FW	18+2	3		3	26
18	(Wales)	Sam Ricketts	DF	6+1		2	0+1	10
19	(United States)	Jack McBean	FW	0+2	1+1		2	6
21	(England)	Andre Wright	FW	7+4	1			12
22	(England)	Jamie Sterry	DF	16	2		2	20
22	(Nigeria)	Yakubu	FW	0+3				3
26	(England)	Ivor Lawton	MF					

=== Goalscorers ===
Correct as of match played on 30 April 2017

No.	Nat.	Player	Pos.	League One	FA Cup	EFL Cup	EFL Trophy	Total
27	(Wales)	George Thomas	FW	5	0	0	4	9
17	(England)	Marvin Sordell	FW	4	2	0	1	7
2	(England)	Jordan Willis	DF	3	0	0	2	5
8	(Portugal)	Rúben Lameiras	MF	1	0	1	3	5
9	(England)	Dan Agyei	FW	4	0	0	1	5
20	(England)	Marcus Tudgay	FW	4	0	0	0	4
24	(England)	Ryan Haynes	DF	0	0	1	3	4
6	(England)	Andy Rose	MF	2	0	1	0	3
14	(England)	Kwame Thomas	FW	3	0	0	0	3
16	(England)	Stuart Beavon	FW	2	0	0	1	3
4	(England)	Jordan Turnbull	DF	0	0	0	2	2
5	(Burundi)	Gaël Bigirimana	MF	0	0	0	2	2
10	(England)	Jodi Jones	MF	1	0	0	1	2
11	(England)	Kyel Reid	MF	2	0	0	0	2
13	(Bulgaria)	Vladimir Gadzhev	MF	1	0	1	0	2
21	(England)	Andre Wright	FW	2	0	0	0	2
31	(England)	Ben Stevenson	MF	2	0	0	0	2
12	(Republic of Ireland)	Chris McCann	MF	1	0	0	0	1
22	(England)	Jamie Sterry	DF	0	1	0	0	1
Own Goals				0	0	0	0	0
Totals				39	3	4	20	64

=== Assists ===
Correct as of match played on 30 April 2017

No.	Nat.	Player	Pos.	League One	FA Cup	EFL Cup	EFL Trophy	Total
10	(England)	Jodi Jones	MF	3	0	0	4	7
5	(Burundi)	Gaël Bigirimana	MF	4	0	0	0	4
8	(Portugal)	Rúben Lameiras	MF	3	0	1	0	4
11	(England)	Kyel Reid	MF	1	1	0	2	4
24	(England)	Ryan Haynes	DF	3	0	0	1	4
6	(England)	Andy Rose	MF	3	0	0	0	3
4	(England)	Jordan Turnbull	DF	2	0	0	0	2
9	(England)	Dan Agyei	FW	1	0	0	1	2
12	(Republic of Ireland)	Callum Reilly	MF	1	0	0	1	2
13	(Bulgaria)	Vladimir Gadzhev	MF	1	1	0	0	2
12	(Republic of Ireland)	Chris McCann	MF	0	0	0	1	1
15	(England)	Lewis Page	DF	1	0	0	0	1
16	(England)	Stuart Beavon	FW	1	0	0	0	1
17	(England)	Marvin Sordell	FW	1	0	0	0	1
20	(England)	Marcus Tudgay	FW	1	0	0	0	1
21	(England)	Andre Wright	FW	0	1	0	0	1
22	(England)	Jamie Sterry	DF	1	0	0	0	1
22	(Nigeria)	Yakubu	FW	1	0	0	0	1
27	(Wales)	George Thomas	FW	0	0	0	1	1
31	(England)	Ben Stevenson	MF	1	0	0	0	1
Totals				29	3	1	11	44

=== Yellow cards ===
Correct as of match played on 30 April 2017

No.	Nat.	Player	Pos.	League One	FA Cup	EFL Cup	EFL Trophy	Total
5	(Burundi)	Gaël Bigirimana	MF	8	0	0	1	9
4	(England)	Jordan Turnbull	DF	5	1	0	2	8
12	(Republic of Ireland)	Chris McCann	MF	5	0	0	1	6
17	(England)	Marvin Sordell	FW	6	0	0	0	6
30	(England)	Dion Kelly-Evans	DF	5	0	0	1	6
13	(Bulgaria)	Vladimir Gadzhev	MF	3	1	1	0	5
22	(England)	Jamie Sterry	DF	4	1	0	0	5
31	(England)	Ben Stevenson	MF	3	0	1	0	4
8	(Portugal)	Rúben Lameiras	MF	1	1	1	0	3
10	(England)	Jodi Jones	MF	3	0	0	0	3
24	(England)	Ryan Haynes	DF	2	0	0	1	3
29	(Wales)	Cian Harries	DF	2	0	0	1	3
2	(England)	Jordan Willis	DF	2	0	0	0	2
15	(England)	Lewis Page	DF	2	0	0	0	2
19	(England)	Farrend Rawson	DF	2	0	0	0	2
20	(England)	Marcus Tudgay	FW	1	0	0	1	2
21	(Republic of Ireland)	Kevin Foley	DF	2	0	0	0	2
35	(England)	Callum Maycock	DF	1	1	0	0	2
7	(England)	Nathan Clarke	DF	1	0	0	0	1
11	(England)	Kyel Reid	MF	1	0	0	0	1
18	(Wales)	Sam Ricketts	DF	1	0	0	0	1
41	(England)	Chris Camwell	DF	1	0	0	0	1
Totals				61	5	3	8	77

=== Red cards ===
Correct as of match played on 30 April 2017

No.	Nat.	Player	Pos.	League One	FA Cup	EFL Cup	EFL Trophy	Total
2	(England)	Jordan Willis	DF	1	0	0	0	1
4	(England)	Jordan Turnbull	DF	1	0	0	0	1
15	(England)	Lewis Page	DF	1	0	0	0	1
30	(England)	Dion Kelly-Evans	DF	0	0	0	1	1
31	(England)	Ben Stevenson	MF	1	0	0	0	1
Totals				4	0	0	1	5

=== Captains ===
Correct as of match played on 30 April 2017

No.	Nat.	Player	Pos.	League One	FA Cup	EFL Cup	EFL Trophy	Total
2	(England)	Jordan Willis	DF	29	3	0	5	37
7	(England)	Nathan Clarke	DF	10	0	0	0	10
18	(Wales)	Sam Ricketts	DF	6	0	2	0	8
20	(England)	Marcus Tudgay	FW	1	0	0	1	2
6	(England)	Andy Rose	MF	0	0	0	1	1
16	(England)	Stuart Beavon	FW	0	0	0	1	1
Totals				46	3	2	8	59

=== Suspensions served ===
No.	Nat.	Player	Pos.	Date suspended	Reason	Matches missed
4	(England)	Jordan Turnbull	DF	20 August 2016	1 red card	Norwich City (A)
30	(England)	Dion Kelly-Evans	DF	30 August 2016	1 red card (EFLT)	Northampton Town (H)
5	(Burundi)	Gaël Bigirimana	MF	1 November 2016	Reached 5 yellow cards	Morecambe (A)
15	(England)	Lewis Page	DF	1 November 2016	1 red card	Morecambe (A)
17	(England)	Marvin Sordell	FW	22 November 2016	Reached 5 yellow cards	Milton Keynes Dons (H)
22	(England)	Jamie Sterry	DF	22 November 2016	Reached 5 yellow cards	Milton Keynes Dons (H)
31	(England)	Ben Stevenson	MF	26 November 2016	1 red card	Cambridge United (A); Southend United (A); Sheffield United (H)
4	(England)	Jordan Turnbull	DF	7 December 2016	Reached 2 yellow cards (EFLT)	Brighton & Hove Albion Academy (H)
2	(England)	Jordan Willis	DF	28 January 2017	1 red card	Millwall (H); Oldham Athletic (A); AFC Wimbledon (A)

=== Monthly & weekly awards ===
No.	Nat.	Player	Pos.	Date	Award	Ref
2	(England)	Jordan Willis	DF	24 October 2016	EFL Team of the Week	

=== End-of-season awards ===
No.	Nat.	Player	Pos.	Date	Award	Ref
27	(Wales)	George Thomas	FW	23 April 2017	CCFC Top Goalscorer	
27	(Wales)	George Thomas	FW	23 April 2017	CCFC JSB Player of the Season	
5	(Burundi)	Gaël Bigirimana	MF	23 April 2017	CCFC FPA Player of the Season	
1	(England)	Lee Burge	GK	23 April 2017	CCFC Supporters' Club Player of the Season	
27	(Wales)	George Thomas	FW	23 April 2017	CCFC Young Player of the Season	

== Transfers ==
=== Transfers in ===
Player	From	Date	Fee	Ref.
(England) Jodi Jones	(England) Dagenham & Redbridge	1 July 2016	Undisclosed	
(England) Kwame Thomas	(England) Derby County	1 July 2016	Free	
(England) Marvin Sordell	(England) Colchester United	4 July 2016	Free	
(England) Jordan Ponticelli	(England) Strachan Football Foundation	26 July 2016	Free	
(England) Kyel Reid	(England) Preston North End	28 July 2016	Free	
(England) Jordan Turnbull	(England) Southampton	15 August 2016	Undisclosed	
(Burundi) Gaël Bigirimana	(England) Newcastle United	26 August 2016	Undisclosed	
(England) Stuart Beavon	(England) Burton Albion	1 January 2017	Free	
(England) Nathan Clarke	(England) Bradford City	1 January 2017	Free	
(Republic of Ireland) Kevin Foley	(England) Charlton Athletic	6 January 2017	Free	
(Nigeria) Yakubu	(Turkey) Kayserispor	13 February 2017	Free	

=== Transfers out ===
Player	To	Date	Fee	Ref.
(France) Marc-Antoine Fortuné	(England) Southend United (Note: Following Marc-Antoine Fortuné being released, he later signed for Southend United.)	1 July 2016	Free	
(England) Darius Henderson	(England) Mansfield Town (Note: Following Darius Henderson being released, he later signed for Mansfield Town.)	1 July 2016	Free	
(Republic of Ireland) Stephen Hunt	Retired (Note: Following Stephen Hunt being released, he later retired from football.)	1 July 2016	Free	
(Benin) Réda Johnson	(England) Eastleigh (Note: Following Réda Johnson being released, he later signed for Eastleigh.)	1 July 2016	Free	
(Sweden) Martin Lorentzson	(Sweden) Örebro SK (Note: Following Martin Lorentzson being released, he later signed for Örebro SK .)	1 July 2016	Free	
(England) Aaron Martin	(England) Oxford United (Note: Following Aaron Martin being released, he later signed for Oxford United.)	1 July 2016	Free	
(Scotland) Jim O'Brien	(England) Shrewsbury Town (Note: Following Jim O'Brien being released, he later signed for Shrewsbury Town.)	1 July 2016	Free	
(England) Aaron Phillips	(England) Northampton Town (Note: Following Aaron Phillips being released, he later signed for Northampton Town.)	1 July 2016	Free	
(England) Peter Ramage	(United States) Arizona United (Note: Following Peter Ramage being released, he later signed for Arizona United.)	1 July 2016	Free	
(Germany) Bassala Sambou	(England) Everton	1 July 2016	Compensation	
(England) Conor Thomas	(England) Swindon Town (Note: Following Conor Thomas being released, he later signed for Swindon Town.)	1 July 2016	Free	
(Scotland) John Fleck	(England) Sheffield United	8 July 2016	Free	
(France) Romain Vincelot	(England) Bradford City	23 July 2016	£60,000	
(Wales) Sam Ricketts	Retired	16 November 2016	Free	
(England) Ivor Lawton	(England) Halesowen Town (Note: Following Ivor Lawton being released, he later signed for Halesowen Town.)	31 December 2016	Free	
(England) Marvin Sordell	(England) Burton Albion	1 January 2017	Free	
(Nigeria) Yakubu	Retired	5 April 2017	Free	

=== Loans in ===
Player	From	Date from	Date to	Ref.
(Republic of Ireland) Chris McCann	(United States) Atlanta United FC	2 August 2016	31 December 2016	
(England) Lewis Page	(England) West Ham United	9 August 2016	5 January 2017	
(England) Dan Agyei	(England) Burnley	18 August 2016	3 January 2017	
(United States) Jack McBean	(United States) LA Galaxy	19 August 2016	5 January 2017	
(England) Jamie Sterry	(England) Newcastle United	31 August 2016	4 January 2017	
(England) Andre Wright	(England) West Bromwich Albion	31 August 2016	5 January 2017	
(Republic of Ireland) Callum Reilly	(England) Burton Albion	1 January 2017	End of season	
(England) Farrend Rawson	(England) Derby County	17 January 2017	End of season	
(England) Charles Vernam	(England) Derby County	23 January 2017	End of season	
(England) Michael Folivi	(England) Watford	31 January 2017	End of season	

=== Loans out ===
Player	To	Date from	Date to	Ref.
(Republic of Ireland) Darragh Leahy	(England) Nuneaton Town	4 November 2016	21 January 2017	
(England) Devon Kelly-Evans	(England) Nuneaton Town	10 February 2017	End of season	

=== Trials ===
Player	From	Date	Signed	Ref.
(Germany) Jordan Brown	(Switzerland) Grasshopper Club Zürich	July 2016	No	
(England) Kane Smith	(England) Hitchin Town	July 2016	No	
(England) Kyel Reid	(England) Preston North End	July 2016	Yes	
(France) Fabien Robert	(England) Swindon Town	July 2016	No	
(Finland) Juhani Ojala	(Russia) Terek Grozny	August 2016	No	
(United States) Jack McBean	(United States) LA Galaxy	August 2016	Yes	
(Argentina) Luciano Becchio	(England) Rotherham United	September 2016	No	
(England) Louis Robles	(United States) Limestone Saints	December 2016	No	
(Saint Kitts and Nevis) Theo Wharton	(Wales) Cardiff City	January 2017	No	
(Mali) Samba Diakite	(England) Queens Park Rangers	January 2017	No	
(Iran) Navid Nasseri	(England) Birmingham City	January 2017	No	
(England) Dean Hammond	(England) Sheffield United	January 2017	No	
(Nigeria) Yakubu	(Turkey) Kayserispor	February 2017	Yes	
