= 2015–16 Coventry City F.C. season =

Coventry City
2015–16 season
- Chairman: Tim Fisher
- Manager: Tony Mowbray
- Stadium: Ricoh Arena
- League One: 8th
- FA Cup: First round vs Northampton Town
- League Cup: First round vs Rochdale
- Football League Trophy: Second round vs Yeovil Town
- Top goalscorer: League: Adam Armstrong 20; All: Adam Armstrong 20
- Highest home attendance: 17,779 vs Port Vale (26 December 2015)
- Lowest home attendance: 9,942 vs Rochdale (5 March 2016)
- Average home league attendance: 12,570
- Biggest win: 6–0 vs Bury (13 February 2016)
- Biggest defeat: 3–0 vs Southend United (23 January 2016)
Home colours	Away colours
- All statistics correct as of 8 May 2016.

The 2015–16 season was Coventry City's 132nd season in their history and fourth consecutive season in League One. Along with competing in League One, the club also participated in the FA Cup, the League Cup and the Football League Trophy. The season covered the period from 1 July 2015 to 30 June 2016.

== Review and events ==
=== July ===
8 players were released on 1 July 2015 with Al Bangura, Adam Barton, Frank Nouble, Shaun Miller, Simeon Jackson, Andy Webster, Danny Pugh and Blair Turgott all leaving the club. Five players from the academy signed professional contracts on 1 July 2015 as Cian Harries, Devon Kelly-Evans, Dion Kelly-Evans, Ben Stevenson and George Thomas all signing contracts alongside Chris Stokes, who signed a one-year contract on a free transfer from Forest Green Rovers. On 6 July 2015, Sam Ricketts joined Coventry City on a free transfer signing a one-year deal with the club. Romain Vincelot signed for the Sky Blues on 8 July 2015. On the same date, Coventry City owners Sisu earned the right to appeal against a Court's decision, which ruled that Coventry City Council's £14.4million loan to the Ricoh Arena operators ACL in 2012 was not state aid with the two-day appeal hearing taking place in February 2016. Réda Johnson extended his time at Coventry City on 10 July 2015, signing a new one-year deal. On 24 July 2015, Rúben Lameiras signed a contract at the club after a successful trial. Adam Armstrong signed a 6-month loan deal from Newcastle United on 28 July 2015. On 31 July 2015, the club announced that assistant manager Neil MacFarlane left the club by mutual agreement.

=== August ===
On 1 August 2015, Coventry City ended their pre-season campaign with a 0–0 draw against Oxford United. They played a total of five games, failing to win a single game after three draws and two losses. A Coventry City XI side also drew 0–0 with Leamington during pre-season. Sam Ricketts was named as captain for the season on 3 August 2015. Bryn Morris was signed on season-long youth loan deal from Middlesbrough on 6 August 2015. Norwich City's Jacob Murphy was signed on loan on 15 August 2015 in a deal which will last till the end of the season. On 18 August, Ivor Lawton was loaned out to Nuneaton Town for one month. The club finished the month in fifth place after winning their first three league games but were defeated by Walsall 2–1 and drew at home to Southend United. Coventry were also knocked out the League Cup when they lost on penalties to Rochdale away from home in the first round. Adam Armstrong was awarded with League One's Player of the month award for August.

=== September ===
Transfer deadline day saw Danny Swanson and Kyle Spence leave the club with just one player coming the other way as Lateef Elford-Alliyu signed a four-month contract with the Sky Blues. Marc-Antoine Fortuné signed for Coventry City on a free transfer, signing on 4 September. Ryan Kent became Coventry's fourth loan signing of the season on 10 September, arriving from Liverpool. Adam Jackson signed on loan for the club on 14 September from Middlesbrough. The Sky Blues finished the month in fourth place after two wins and two defeats, beating Burton Albion and Chesterfield but losing to Scunthorpe United and Bury.

=== October ===
Former England-International midfielder Joe Cole was signed by Tony Mowbray on 16 October, signing for 35 days with the club. George Thomas was loaned out to Yeovil Town on 24 October until 21 November. On 24 October, Reice Charles-Cook broke a post-war club record as he went 578 minutes without conceding a goal overtaking Steve Ogrizovic's 572 minutes without conceding. Coventry City were in fourth place by the end of the month without losing a game in the league winning three of the six fixtures. However, they were knocked out the Football League Trophy in the second round by League Two side Yeovil Town on penalties after drawing the game 0–0.

=== November ===
Steve Waggott left his position at the club as chief executive on 5 November. This was followed by the appointment of Chris Anderson as executive vice-chairman and managing director on the next day. Ryan Kent was temporarily recalled to Liverpool after a change in managers saw Jürgen Klopp take charge and on 18 November, Klopp revealed he was happy for Kent to resume his loan spell after believing he was at the right place. A further two loan signings was made with Newcastle United midfielder Gaël Bigirimana and Cardiff City defender Ben Turner returning to the club until 3 January 2016 after signing on 16 November and 18 November. It was announced on 19 November that Joe Cole will be staying at the Ricoh Arena until 3 January after a loan extension. Yeovil Town extended their loan deal for George Thomas, meaning he will remain at the club till January. On 22 November, Jacob Murphy became only the second-ever player to score a hat-tick at the Ricoh Arena. Coventry had another undefeated month in the league meaning the Sky Blues were unbeaten in their last eleven matches, the best run at the club since 1967. This meant that the club ended the month in first place with three wins and two draws in November. However, Coventry City were defeated when they were knocked out the FA Cup in the first round after a home defeat to Northampton Town on 7 November.

== Competitions ==
=== Preseason friendlies ===
On 7 May 2015, Coventry City announced their first pre-season friendly away to Luton Town on 25 July 2015. On 18 May 2015, Coventry City announced a pre-season friendly against Oxford United on 1 August 2015. On 21 May 2015, Coventry City announced their third pre-season friendly against Cambridge United. On 1 June 2015, a friendly against Nuneaton Town was confirmed for 11 July 2015. On 3 July 2015, it was revealed that Coventry City's fixture against Oxford United will be played at Liberty Way as Oxford United want to make sure that their pitch is at the highest quality for the start of the season. A fixture against Portsmouth was announced on 11 July 2015, which will take place at Havant and Waterlooville's West Leigh Park. On 22 July 2015, the Sky Blues announced a XI side will face Leamington on 29 July 2015.

11 July 2015 Friendly	Nuneaton Town	0–0	Coventry City	Nuneaton
14:00 BST		Report		Stadium: JDRF James Parnell Stadium; Attendance: 1,502

21 July 2015 Friendly	Portsmouth	2–1	Coventry City	Havant
19:30 BST	Chaplin 4'; Evans 45'	Report	G. Thomas 53'	Stadium: West Leigh Park

25 July 2015 Friendly	Luton Town	1–1	Coventry City	Luton
15:00 BST	Marriott 87'	Report	Maddison 48'	Stadium: Kenilworth Road; Attendance: 2,436 (278 Sky Blue Army)

28 July 2015 Friendly	Cambridge United	1–0	Coventry City	Cambridge
19:45 BST	Legge 36'	Report		Stadium: Abbey Stadium; Attendance: 1,934 (140 Sky Blue Army); Referee: Fred Graham

29 July 2015 Friendly	Leamington	0–0	Coventry City XI	Whitnash
19:30 BST		Report		Stadium: New Windmill Ground; Attendance: 508

1 August 2015 Friendly	Oxford United	0–0	Coventry City	Nuneaton
15:00 BST		Report		Stadium: JDRF James Parnell Stadium; Attendance: 878

=== League One ===
On 17 June 2015, the fixtures for the forthcoming season were announced.

==== League table ====
Pos	Team	Pld	W	D	L	GF	GA	GD	Pts	Promotion, qualification or relegation
6	Barnsley (O, P)	46	22	8	16	70	54	+16	74	Qualification for the League One play-offs (Note: Four teams play for one spot and promotion to Football League Championship.)
7	Scunthorpe United	46	21	11	14	60	47	+13	74	
8	Coventry City	46	19	12	15	67	49	+18	69	
9	Gillingham	46	19	12	15	71	56	+15	69	
10	Rochdale	46	19	12	15	68	61	+7	69	

Updated to match(es) played on 1 July 2016. Source: BBC Sport
Rules for classification: 1) Points; 2) Goal difference; 3) Number of goals scored
(O) Play-off winners; (P) Promoted

==== Results summary ====
Overall								Home						Away					
Pld	W	D	L	GF	GA	GD	Pts	W	D	L	GF	GA	GD	W	D	L	GF	GA	GD
46	19	12	15	67	49	+18	69	12	6	5	41	24	+17	7	6	10	26	25	+1

Last updated: 8 May 2016.

==== Results by matchday ====
Matchday	1	2	3	4	5	6	7	8	9	10	11	12	13	14	15	16	17	18	19	20	21	22	23	24	25	26	27	28	29	30	31	32	33	34	35	36	37	38	39	40	41	42	43	44	45	46
Ground	H	A	H	A	H	A	A	H	A	H	A	H	A	A	H	H	A	H	A	H	A	H	H	A	A	H	H	A	H	A	H	A	H	A	H	A	H	A	H	A	A	H	H	A	H	A
Result	W	W	W	L	D	W	L	W	L	W	W	D	D	D	W	W	W	W	D	D	L	D	W	D	W	D	L	L	L	D	W	L	L	L	L	W	D	L	L	D	L	W	W	L	W	W
Position	4	1	1	3	5	2	4	4	4	5	5	5	4	4	4	4	2	1	1	1	2	3	4	4	4	4	4	5	5	5	5	6	6	7	8	7	8	9	9	11	13	12	11	12	9	8

Updated to match(es) played on 8 May 2016. Source: Statto.com
A = Away; H = Home; W = Win; D = Draw; L = Loss

==== Fixtures ====
8 August 2015 1	Coventry City	2–0	Wigan Athletic	Coventry
15:00 BST	Armstrong 15', 62'	BBC Report		Stadium: Ricoh Arena; Attendance: 13,131; Referee: Scott Duncan

15 August 2015 2	Millwall	0–4	Coventry City	London
15:00 BST		Report	Armstrong 6', 24'; Lameiras 19'; O'Brien 80'	Stadium: The Den; Attendance: 11,197; Referee: Andy Woolmer

18 August 2015 3	Coventry City	3–2	Crewe Alexandra	Coventry
19:45 BST	Fleck 14'; Armstrong 51'; O'Brien 83'	Report	Inman 31'; Haber 53'	Stadium: Ricoh Arena; Attendance: 11,511; Referee: Tim Robinson

22 August 2015 4	Walsall	2–1	Coventry City	Walsall
15:00 BST	Forde 40'; Bradshaw 52'	Report	Murphy 56'	Stadium: Bescot Stadium; Attendance: 7,176; Referee: Jeremy Simpson

31 August 2015 5	Coventry City	2–2	Southend United	Coventry
19:45 BST	Johnson 34'; Ricketts 72'	Report	Hunt 36'; Mooney 41' (pen.)	Stadium: Ricoh Arena; Attendance: 12,967; Referee: Darren Handley

6 September 2015 6	Burton Albion	1–2	Coventry City	Burton upon Trent
14:30 BST	Martin 11' (o.g.)	Report	Tudgay 20'; Vincelot 56'	Stadium: Pirelli Stadium; Attendance: 4,633; Referee: Peter Bankes

12 September 2015 7	Scunthorpe United	1–0	Coventry City	Scunthorpe
15:00 BST	Madden 79'	Report		Stadium: Glanford Park; Attendance: 3,746; Referee: Andy Haines

19 September 2015 8	Coventry City	1–0	Chesterfield	Coventry
15:00 BST	Armstrong 50'	Report	Dieseruvwe (red card) 89'	Stadium: Ricoh Arena; Attendance: 11,003; Referee: Darren Bond

26 September 2015 9	Bury	2–1	Coventry City	Bury
15:00 BST	L. Clarke 19', 51' (pen.)	Report	Johnson 62'	Stadium: Gigg Lane; Attendance: 4,526; Referee: Nigel Miller

3 October 2015 10	Coventry City	3–0	Shrewsbury Town	Coventry
15:00 BST	Armstrong 26', 65'; Fortuné 45' (pen.)	Report		Stadium: Ricoh Arena; Attendance: 11,445; Referee: Chris Sarginson

10 October 2015 11	Fleetwood Town	0–1	Coventry City	Fleetwood
15:00 BST		Report	Wood 90' (o.g.)	Stadium: Highbury; Attendance: 3,864; Referee: Mark Heywood

17 October 2015 12	Coventry City	0–0	Blackpool	Coventry
15:00 BST		Report		Stadium: Ricoh Arena; Attendance: 12,094; Referee: Keith Hill

20 October 2015 13	Rochdale	0–0	Coventry City	Rochdale
15:00 BST		Report		Stadium: Spotland Stadium; Attendance: 2,495; Referee: Mark Haywood

24 October 2015 14	Swindon Town	2–2	Coventry City	Swindon
15:00 BST	Gladwin 85'; Ajose 90' (pen.)	Report	Vincelot 66'; Tudgay 81'	Stadium: The County Ground; Attendance: 8,309; Referee: Dean Whitestone

31 October 2015 15	Coventry City	3–2	Peterborough United	Coventry
15:00 GMT	Vincelot 56'; Armstrong 80', 87'	Report	J. Anderson 15'; Oztumer 36'	Stadium: Ricoh Arena; Attendance: 11,853; Referee: Gavin Ward

3 November 2015 16	Coventry City	4–3	Barnsley	Coventry
19:45 BST	Kent 3'; Armstrong 18', 52'; Cole 60'	Report	Mawson 48'; Scowen 54', 90'	Stadium: Ricoh Arena; Attendance: 10,954; Referee: Michael Bull

14 November 2015 17	Colchester United	1–3	Coventry City	Colchester
15:00 GMT	Bonne 17'	Report	Murphy 32', 40'; Fortune 49'	Stadium: Weston Homes Community Stadium; Attendance: 5,275; Referee: Graham Horwood

21 November 2015 18	Coventry City	4–1	Gillingham	Coventry
15:00 GMT	Murphy 34', 41', 44'; Turner 37'	Report	Dack 63'	Stadium: Ricoh Arena; Attendance: 15.604; Referee: Mark Brown

24 November 2015 19	Bradford City	0–0	Coventry City	Bradford
19:45 GMT		Report		Stadium: Valley Parade; Attendance: 17,757; Referee: Nigel Miller

28 November 2015 20	Coventry City	2–2	Doncaster Rovers	Coventry
15:00 GMT	Armstrong 30'; Fleck 59'	Report	Tyson 52', 72'	Stadium: Ricoh Arena; Attendance: 11,885; Referee: Lee Swabey

13 December 2015 21	Sheffield United	1–0	Coventry City	Sheffield
12:00 GMT	Sharp 79'	Report		Stadium: Bramall Lane; Attendance: 18,074; Referee: Iain Williamson

19 December 2015 22	Coventry City	1–1	Oldham Athletic	Coventry
15:00 GMT	Martin 49'	Report	Philliskirk 90+3'	Stadium: Ricoh Arena; Attendance: 15,419; Referee: David Webb

26 December 2015 23	Coventry City	1–0	Port Vale	Coventry
15:00 GMT	Maddison 80'	Report		Stadium: Ricoh Arena; Attendance: 17,779; Referee: Robert Lewis

28 December 2015 24	Chesterfield	1–1	Coventry City	Chesterfield
15:00 GMT	Novak 38'	Report	Maddison 89'	Stadium: Proact Stadium; Attendance: 9,057; Referee: Paul Tierney

2 January 2016 25	Crewe Alexandra	0–5	Coventry City	Crewe
15:00 GMT		Report	Armstrong 11', 30' (pen.), 45'; Murphy 27', 85'	Stadium: Gresty Road; Attendance: 5,946; Referee: Mark Haywood

12 January 2016 26	Coventry City	1–1	Walsall	Coventry
19:45 GMT	Stokes 34'	Report	Chambers (yellow card) 65'; Bradshaw 81'; Demetriou (yellow card) 88'	Stadium: Ricoh Arena; Attendance: 15,671; Referee: (England) Tony Harrington

16 January 2016 27	Coventry City	0–2	Burton Albion	Coventry
15:00 GMT	Fleck (yellow card) 55'; Vincelot (yellow card) 81'	Report	Mousinho (yellow card) 25'; Butcher 49'; Cansdell-Sherriff (yellow card) 70'; Beavon 72'	Stadium: Ricoh Arena; Attendance: 17,140; Referee: (England) Andre Marriner

23 January 2016 28	Southend United	3–0	Coventry City	Southend
15:00 GMT	Payne 24'; Barnett 31' 68' (pen.); Deegan (yellow card) 44' (yellow-red card); Bolger (yellow card) 90'	Report	Charles-Cook (yellow card) 66'	Stadium: Roots Hall; Attendance: 8,767; Referee: (England) Brendan Malone

30 January 2016 29	Coventry City	1–2	Scunthorpe United	Coventry
15:00 GMT	Vincelot (yellow card) 76' (yellow-red card); Armstrong 86' (pen.)	Report	Hopper 9'; Wallace 62'; McSheffrey (yellow card) 90+4'	Stadium: Ricoh Arena; Attendance: 11,138; Referee: (England) James Linington

7 February 2016 30	Port Vale	1–1	Coventry City	Stoke-on-Trent
14:00 GMT	Kelly 84'	Report	Murphy 42'; Henderson (yellow card) 70'	Stadium: Vale Park; Attendance: 6,320; Referee: (England) Phil Gibbs

13 February 2016 31	Coventry City	6–0	Bury	Coventry
15:00 GMT	Stokes 4'; Cargill 12'; Maddison 16'; Fleck 43'; Armstrong 68', 70'	Report	Soares (yellow card) 28'; Brown (yellow card) 41'; Lowe (yellow card) 58'; Tutte (yellow card) 82'	Stadium: Ricoh Arena; Attendance: 11,024; Referee: (England) Andy Davies

27 February 2016 32	Coventry City	1–2	Fleetwood Town	Coventry
15:00 GMT	Vincelot (yellow card) 22'; Tudgay 75'; Fleck (yellow card) 78'	Report	Burns 56'; Ball 83'	Stadium: Ricoh Arena; Attendance: 11,160; Referee: (England) Andy Davies

1 March 2016 33	Barnsley	2–0	Coventry City	Barnsley
19:45 GMT	Roberts 10'; Brownhill (yellow card) 70'; Fletcher 60' (yellow card) 73'	Report	Ricketts (yellow card) 58'	Stadium: Oakwell; Attendance: 9,344; Referee: (England) Ross Joyce

5 March 2016 34	Coventry City	0–1	Rochdale	Coventry
15:00 GMT		Report	Camps (yellow card) 83'; Henderson 89' (pen.)	Stadium: Ricoh Arena; Attendance: 9,942; Referee: (England) Oliver Langford

8 March 2016 35	Shrewsbury Town	2–1	Coventry City	Shrewsbury
19:45 GMT	Whalley (yellow card) 4' (goal) 39'; Kaikai 9'; Black (yellow card) 48'	Report	Martin 4'; Stokes (yellow card) 38'; Stephens (yellow card) 82'	Stadium: Greenhous Meadow; Attendance: 6,023; Referee: (England) Sebastian Stockbridge

12 March 2016 36	Blackpool	0–1	Coventry City	Blackpool
15:00 GMT	Boyce (yellow card) 69'; Osayi_Samuel (yellow card) 90+7'	Report	Fortuné 26'	Stadium: Bloomfield Road; Attendance: 8,869; Referee: (England) Mark Brown

19 March 2016 37	Coventry City	0–0	Swindon Town	Coventry
15:00 GMT	Vincelot (yellow card) 27'	Report	Rodgers (yellow card) 45'; Thompson (yellow card) 59'	Stadium: Ricoh Arena; Attendance: 12,322; Referee: Darren England

25 March 2016 38	Peterborough United	3–1	Coventry City	Peterborough
19:45 GMT	Bostwick 45'; Angol 61'; Beautyman 69'; Fox (yellow card) 88'; Coulthirst (yellow card) 90+6'	Report	Cole 65'; Ricketts (yellow card) 90+5'	Stadium: London Road; Attendance: 6,021; Referee: (England) Chris Kavanagh

29 March 2016 39	Coventry City	0–1	Colchester United	Coventry
19:45 BST	Stephens (yellow card) 23'; Vincelot (yellow card) 74'	Report	Massey 18'; Lapslie (yellow card) 88'	Stadium: Ricoh Arena; Attendance: 10,027; Referee: (England) Tim Robinson

2 April 2016 40	Gillingham	0–0	Coventry City	Gillingham
15:00 BST	Nelson (yellow card) 90+1'	Report	Bigirimana (yellow card) 90'	Stadium: Priestfield; Attendance: 7,200; Referee: (England) Chris Sarginson

9 April 2016 41	Wigan Athletic	1–0	Coventry City	Wigan
15:00 BST	Grigg 57'	Report	Cole (yellow card) 59'; Murphy (yellow card) 90+3'	Stadium: DW Stadium; Attendance: 10,415; Referee: (England) Dean Whitestone

16 April 2016 42	Coventry City	2–1	Millwall	Coventry
15:00 BST	Fleck 61'; Tudgay 70'	Report	Webster 19' (yellow card) 90+2'; Williams (red card) 28'; Abdou (yellow card) 84'	Stadium: Ricoh Arena; Attendance: 11,632; Referee: (England) Mark Haywood

19 April 2016 43	Coventry City	1–0	Bradford City	Coventry
19:45 BST	Rose 59' (yellow card) 43'; Fleck (yellow card) 77'; Vincelot (yellow card) 84'; Armstrong (yellow card) 90+5'	Report	Clarke (yellow card) 62'; Davies (red card) 82'	Stadium: Ricoh Arena; Attendance: 10,241; Referee: (England) Rob Lewis

23 April 2016 44	Doncaster Rovers	2–0	Coventry City	Doncaster
15:00 BST	Rowe 21'; Williams 32'; Middleton (yellow card) 82'	Report		Stadium: Keepmoat Stadium; Attendance: 6,364; Referee: (England) Darren Handley

30 April 2016 45	Coventry City	3–1	Sheffield United	Coventry
15:00 BST	Fortuné 4'; Rose 8'; Fleck (yellow card) 80'; Rúben Lameiras 87'	Report	Coutts (yellow card) 33'; Sharp 58' (pen.); Adams (yellow card) 67'	Stadium: Ricoh Arena; Attendance: 13,177; Referee: (England) Andrew Davey

8 May 2016 46	Oldham Athletic	0–2	Coventry City	Oldham
12:30 BST		Report	Vincelot 74'; Armstrong 81'	Stadium: Boundary Park; Attendance: 4,928; Referee: Darren England

=== FA Cup ===
Coventry City will begin their FA Cup campaign in the first round with ties being played on 6 November 2015 to 9 November 2015.

7 November 2015 First round	Coventry City	1–2	Northampton Town	Coventry
15:00 BST	Murphy 10'	Report	Diamond 5'; Richards 18'	Stadium: Ricoh Arena; Attendance: 9,124; Referee: Darren Handley

=== League Cup ===
On 16 June 2015, the first round draw was made, Coventry City were drawn away against Rochdale. On 11 August 2015, the fixture was played at Spotland with Coventry City exiting the competition on penalties.

11 August 2015 First round	Rochdale	1–1 (a.e.t.) (5–3 p)	Coventry City	Rochdale
19:45 BST	McDermott 45'	Report	Tudgay 84'	Stadium: Spotland; Attendance: 1,986; Referee: Eddie Ilderton
	Penalties
	Rose (penalty scored); Henderson (penalty scored); Kennedy (penalty scored); Rafferty (penalty scored); Andrew (penalty scored)		Tudgay (penalty scored); Morris (penalty scored); Maddison (penalty scored); Lameiras (penalty missed)

=== Football League Trophy ===
Coventry City will play in Southern Section of the competition. Their first match of the Football League Trophy will be during the week commencing 5 October after receiving a bye, which means they automatically qualify for the second round, where they will play away at Yeovil Town.

6 October 2015 Second round	Yeovil Town	0–0 (4–3 p)	Coventry City	Yeovil
19:45 BST		Report		Stadium: Huish Park; Attendance: 1,605; Referee: Kevin Johnson
	Penalties
	Dickson (penalty scored); Bird (penalty scored); Howells (penalty scored); Laird (penalty scored)		Tudgay (penalty scored); Elford-Alliyu (penalty missed); Murphy (penalty scored); G. Thomas (penalty scored); Ricketts (penalty missed)

=== Birmingham Senior Cup ===
On the Birmingham FA website the first round details of the Birmingham Senior Cup were announced, with Coventry City to face Stratford Town.

21 October 2015 First round	Stratford Town	2–1	Coventry City	Stratford-upon-Avon
19.45 BST	Ahenkorah 2'; McGrath 83'		G. Thomas 15' (pen.)	Stadium: The DCS Stadium; Attendance: 261; Referee: Grant Taylor

== Squad information ==
=== Squad details ===
No.	Name	Position	Nationality	Place of birth	Date of birth (age) *	Club apps *	Club goals *	Signed from	Date signed	Fee	Contract End
Goalkeepers
1	Lee Burge	GK	(England)	Hereford	9 January 1993 (aged 22)	22	0	Academy	1 June 2010	Trainee	30 June 2017
23	Reice Charles-Cook	GK	(England)	Lewisham	8 April 1994 (aged 21)	0	0	Bury	18 July 2014	Free	30 June 2018
43	Corey Addai	GK	(England)	London	10 October 1997 (aged 17)	0	0	Academy	1 June 2014	Trainee	30 June 2016
Defenders
2	Jordan Willis	CB	(England)	Coventry	24 August 1994 (aged 20)	77	0	Academy	1 June 2011	Trainee	30 June 2018
3	Chris Stokes	LB	(England)	Frome	8 April 1991 (aged 24)	16	1	Forest Green Rovers	21 February 2015	Free	30 June 2016
5	Réda Johnson	CB	(Benin) (France)	Marseille	21 March 1988 (aged 27)	22	6	Sheffield Wednesday	4 July 2014	Free	30 June 2016
12	Martin Lorentzson	RB	(Sweden)	Östertälje	21 July 1984 (aged 30)	0	0	(Sweden) Åtvidabergs FF	7 December 2015	Free	30 June 2016
15	Jack Stephens	CB	(England)	Torpoint	27 January 1994 (aged 21)	0	0	Southampton	1 February 2016	Loan	30 June 2016
17	Aaron Phillips	RB	(England)	Warwick	20 November 1993 (aged 21)	35	3	Academy	1 June 2011	Trainee	30 June 2016
18	Sam Ricketts	CB	(Wales) (England)	Aylesbury	11 October 1981 (aged 33)	0	0	Wolverhampton Wanderers	6 July 2015	Free	30 June 2016
21	Aaron Martin	CB	(England)	Newport	29 September 1989 (aged 25)	40	0	Yeovil Town	9 January 2015	Free	30 June 2016
22	Peter Ramage	CB	(England)	Ashington	22 November 1983 (aged 31)	0	0	(India) Kerala Blasters	7 January 2016	Free	30 June 2016
26	Ryan Haynes	LB	(England)	Northampton	27 September 1995 (aged 19)	34	1	Academy	27 March 2013	Trainee	30 June 2017
29	Cian Harries	CB	(Wales) (England)	Solihull	1 April 1997 (aged 18)	0	0	Academy	1 June 2014	Trainee	30 June 2018
30	Dion Kelly-Evans	RB	(England)	Coventry	21 September 1996 (aged 18)	0	0	Academy	1 June 2014	Trainee	30 June 2016
Midfielders
4	Romain Vincelot	DM	(France)	Poitiers	29 October 1985 (aged 29)	0	0	Leyton Orient	8 July 2015	£25,000	30 June 2017
6	Conor Thomas	CM	(England)	Coventry	29 October 1993 (aged 21)	111	1	Academy	1 June 2010	Trainee	30 June 2016
7	John Fleck	CM	(Scotland)	Glasgow	24 August 1991 (aged 23)	139	4	(Scotland) Rangers	4 July 2012	Free	30 June 2016
8	Rúben Lameiras	RM	(Portugal)	Lisbon	22 December 1994 (aged 20)	0	0	Tottenham Hotspur	24 July 2015	Free	30 June 2017
10	James Maddison	AM	(England)	Coventry	23 November 1996 (aged 18)	18	2	Norwich City	1 February 2016	Loan	30 June 2016
11	Jim O'Brien	AM	(Scotland) (Republic of Ireland)	Alexandria	28 September 1987 (aged 27)	48	6	Barnsley	4 July 2014	Free	30 June 2016
13	Vladimir Gadzhev	CM	(Bulgaria)	Pazardzhik	18 July 1987 (aged 27)	0	0	(Bulgaria) Levski Sofia	24 March 2016	Free	30 June 2017
14	Joe Cole	AM	(England)	Paddington	8 November 1981 (aged 33)	0	0	Aston Villa	16 October 2015	Free	30 June 2016
16	Andy Rose	CM	(England) (Australia)	Melbourne	13 February 1990 (aged 25)	0	0	(United States) Seattle Sounders FC	2 January 2016	Free	30 June 2017
19	Gaël Bigirimana	CM	(Burundi) (England)	Bujumbura	22 October 1993 (aged 21)	28	0	Newcastle United	16 November 2015	Loan	30 June 2016
24	Ivor Lawton	CM	(England)	Coventry	5 September 1995 (aged 19)	0	0	Academy	26 November 2013	Trainee	30 June 2016
31	Ben Stevenson	CM	(England)	Leicester	23 March 1997 (aged 18)	0	0	Academy	16 March 2015	Trainee	30 June 2017
42	Stephen Hunt	RM	(Republic of Ireland)	Waterford	1 August 1981 (aged 33)	0	0	Ipswich Town	8 January 2016	Free	30 June 2016
45	Jodi Jones	AM	(England)	Bow	22 October 1997 (aged 17)	0	0	Dagenham & Redbridge	18 March 2016	Loan	30 June 2016
–	Jack Finch	DM	(England)	Fenny Compton	6 August 1996 (aged 18)	21	0	Academy	1 April 2014	Trainee	30 June 2016
–	Devon Kelly-Evans	LM	(England)	Coventry	21 September 1996 (aged 18)	0	0	Academy	1 June 2014	Trainee	30 June 2016
–	Bilal Sayoud	AM	(England)	London	5 May 1997 (aged 18)	0	0	Nike Academy	24 March 2016	Free	30 June 2018
–	Kyle Spence	LM	(Scotland) (England)	Croydon	14 January 1997 (aged 18)	1	0	Unattached	15 February 2016	Free	30 June 2016
Forwards
9	Adam Armstrong	CF	(England)	West Denton	10 February 1997 (aged 18)	0	0	Newcastle United	28 July 2015	Loan	30 June 2016
20	Marcus Tudgay	CF	(England)	Shoreham-by-Sea	3 February 1983 (aged 32)	23	4	Nottingham Forest	29 July 2014	Free	30 June 2016
25	Jacob Murphy	FW	(England)	Wembley	24 February 1995 (aged 20)	0	0	Norwich City	14 August 2015	Loan	30 June 2016
27	George Thomas	FW	(Wales) (England)	Leicester	24 March 1997 (aged 18)	8	0	Academy	25 October 2013	Free	30 June 2016
32	Marc-Antoine Fortuné	CF	(France)	Cayenne	2 July 1981 (aged 33)	0	0	Wigan Athletic	4 September 2015	Free	30 June 2016
34	Bassala Sambou	CF	(Germany) (England)	Germany	15 October 1997 (aged 17)	0	0	Academy	13 May 2014	Trainee	30 June 2016
44	Darius Henderson	CF	(England)	Sutton	7 September 1981 (aged 33)	0	0	Scunthorpe United	5 February 2016	Free	30 June 2016
Left before the end of the season
12	Bryn Morris	CM	(England)	Hartlepool	25 April 1996 (aged 19)	0	0	Middlesbrough	6 August 2015	Loan	30 June 2016
14	Danny Swanson	AM	(Scotland)	Edinburgh	28 December 1986 (aged 28)	18	0	Peterborough United	3 July 2014	Free	30 June 2016
15	Adam Jackson	CB	(England)	Darlington	18 May 1994 (aged 21)	0	0	Middlesbrough	14 September 2015	Loan	12 October 2015
15	Ben Turner	CB	(England)	Birmingham	21 January 1988 (aged 27)	84	4	(Wales) Cardiff City	18 November 2015	Loan	22 December 2015
16	Lateef Elford-Alliyu	CF	(England) (Nigeria)	Ibadan	1 June 1992 (aged 23)	0	0	(Malta) Valletta	1 September 2015	Free	31 December 2015
38	Baily Cargill	CB	(England)	Winchester	5 July 1995 (aged 19)	0	0	Bournemouth	1 February 2016	Loan	12 March 2016
40	Ryan Kent	LM	(England)	Oldham	11 November 1996 (aged 18)	0	0	Liverpool	10 September 2015	Loan	3 January 2016

* Player age and appearances/goals for the club as of beginning of 2015–16 season.

=== Appearances ===
Correct as of match played on 8 May 2016

No.	Nat.	Player	Pos.	League One	FA Cup	League Cup	FL Trophy	Total
1	(England)	Lee Burge	GK	9	1			10
2	(England)	Jordan Willis	DF	4				4
3	(England)	Chris Stokes	DF	36	1	1		38
4	(France)	Romain Vincelot	MF	45		1		46
5	(Benin)	Réda Johnson	DF	12				12
6	(England)	Conor Thomas	MF	0+3	1		1	5
7	(Scotland)	John Fleck	MF	40	1	1	1	43
8	(Portugal)	Rúben Lameiras	MF	18+11	1	1	1	32
9	(England)	Adam Armstrong	FW	38+2				40
10	(England)	James Maddison	MF	14+9		0+1		24
11	(Scotland)	Jim O'Brien	MF	20+6	1	1	1	29
12	(Sweden)	Martin Lorentzson	DF	5+2				7
13	(Bulgaria)	Vladimir Gadzhev	MF	0+2				2
14	(England)	Joe Cole	MF	18+4				22
15	(England)	Jack Stephens	DF	16				16
16	(England)	Andy Rose	MF	7+5				12
17	(England)	Aaron Phillips	DF	17+6	1	1	1	26
18	(Wales)	Sam Ricketts	DF	43	1	1	1	46
19	(Burundi)	Gaël Bigirimana	MF	9+4				13
20	(England)	Marcus Tudgay	FW	6+19		1	1	27
21	(England)	Aaron Martin	DF	29	1	1	1	32
22	(England)	Peter Ramage	DF	3+1				4
23	(England)	Reice Charles-Cook	GK	37		1	1	39
24	(England)	Ivor Lawton	MF				0+1	1
25	(England)	Jacob Murphy	FW	29+11	1		1	42
26	(England)	Ryan Haynes	DF	4+5	0+1		1	11
27	(Wales)	George Thomas	FW	2+5		0+1	0+1	9
29	(Wales)	Cian Harries	DF	1				1
30	(England)	Dion Kelly-Evans	DF	0+1				1
31	(England)	Ben Stevenson	MF					
32	(France)	Marc-Antoine Fortuné	FW	14+11	1			26
34	(Germany)	Bassala Sambou	FW		0+1			1
42	(Republic of Ireland)	Stephen Hunt	MF	5				5
43	(England)	Corey Addai	GK					
44	(England)	Darius Henderson	FW	0+5				5
45	(England)	Jodi Jones	MF	4+2				6
–	(England)	Jack Finch	MF					
–	(England)	Devon Kelly-Evans	MF					
–	(Scotland)	Kyle Spence	MF					
–	(England)	Bilal Sayoud	MF					
Left before the end of the season
12	(England)	Bryn Morris	MF	1+5		1		7
14	(Scotland)	Danny Swanson	MF					
15	(England)	Adam Jackson	DF					
15	(England)	Ben Turner	DF	5				5
16	(England)	Lateef Elford-Alliyu	FW		0+1		0+1	2
38	(England)	Baily Cargill	DF	5				5
40	(England)	Ryan Kent	MF	10+7				17

=== Goalscorers ===
Correct as of match played on 8 May 2016

No.	Nat.	Player	Pos.	League One	FA Cup	League Cup	FL Trophy	Total
9	(England)	Adam Armstrong	FW	20	0	0	0	20
25	(England)	Jacob Murphy	FW	9	1	0	0	10
20	(England)	Marcus Tudgay	FW	4	0	1	0	5
4	(France)	Romain Vincelot	MF	4	0	0	0	4
7	(Scotland)	John Fleck	MF	4	0	0	0	4
32	(France)	Marc-Antoine Fortuné	FW	4	0	0	0	4
10	(England)	James Maddison	MF	3	0	0	0	3
3	(England)	Chris Stokes	DF	2	0	0	0	2
5	(Benin)	Réda Johnson	DF	2	0	0	0	2
8	(Portugal)	Rúben Lameiras	MF	2	0	0	0	2
11	(Scotland)	Jim O'Brien	MF	2	0	0	0	2
14	(England)	Joe Cole	MF	2	0	0	0	2
16	(England)	Andy Rose	MF	2	0	0	0	2
21	(England)	Aaron Martin	DF	2	0	0	0	2
15	(England)	Ben Turner	DF	1	0	0	0	1
18	(Wales)	Sam Ricketts	DF	1	0	0	0	1
38	(England)	Baily Cargill	DF	1	0	0	0	1
40	(England)	Ryan Kent	MF	1	0	0	0	1
Own Goals				1	0	0	0	1
Totals				67	1	1	0	69

=== Assists ===
Correct as of match played on 8 May 2016

No.	Nat.	Player	Pos.	League One	FA Cup	League Cup	FL Trophy	Total
25	(England)	Jacob Murphy	FW	9	0	0	0	9
14	(England)	Joe Cole	MF	7	0	0	0	7
11	(Scotland)	Jim O'Brien	MF	6	0	0	0	6
9	(England)	Adam Armstrong	FW	4	0	0	0	4
7	(Scotland)	John Fleck	MF	3	0	0	0	3
17	(England)	Aaron Phillips	DF	3	0	0	0	3
32	(France)	Marc-Antoine Fortuné	FW	3	0	0	0	3
3	(England)	Chris Stokes	DF	2	0	0	0	2
8	(Portugal)	Rúben Lameiras	MF	2	0	0	0	2
10	(England)	James Maddison	MF	2	0	0	0	2
6	(England)	Conor Thomas	MF	0	1	0	0	1
20	(England)	Marcus Tudgay	FW	1	0	0	0	1
21	(England)	Aaron Martin	DF	1	0	0	0	1
27	(Wales)	George Thomas	FW	0	0	1	0	1
40	(England)	Ryan Kent	MF	1	0	0	0	1
Totals				44	1	1	0	46

=== Yellow cards ===
Correct as of match played on 8 May 2016

No.	Nat.	Player	Pos.	League One	FA Cup	League Cup	FL Trophy	Total
7	(Scotland)	John Fleck	MF	13	0	0	0	13
4	(France)	Romain Vincelot	MF	11	0	0	0	11
18	(Wales)	Sam Ricketts	DF	2	1	0	0	3
21	(England)	Aaron Martin	DF	3	0	0	0	3
3	(England)	Chris Stokes	DF	2	0	0	0	2
9	(England)	Adam Armstrong	FW	2	0	0	0	2
11	(Scotland)	Jim O'Brien	MF	2	0	0	0	2
15	(England)	Jack Stephens	DF	2	0	0	0	2
25	(England)	Jacob Murphy	FW	2	0	0	0	2
5	(Benin)	Réda Johnson	DF	1	0	0	0	1
8	(Portugal)	Rúben Lameiras	MF	1	0	0	0	1
10	(England)	James Maddison	MF	1	0	0	0	1
12	(England)	Bryn Morris	MF	0	0	1	0	1
14	(England)	Joe Cole	MF	1	0	0	0	1
15	(England)	Ben Turner	DF	1	0	0	0	1
16	(England)	Andy Rose	MF	1	0	0	0	1
17	(England)	Aaron Phillips	DF	1	0	0	0	1
19	(Burundi)	Gaël Bigirimana	MF	1	0	0	0	1
20	(England)	Marcus Tudgay	FW	0	0	1	0	1
23	(England)	Reice Charles-Cook	GK	1	0	0	0	1
44	(England)	Darius Henderson	FW	1	0	0	0	1
Totals				49	1	2	0	52

=== Red cards ===
Correct as of match played on 8 May 2016

No.	Nat.	Player	Pos.	League One	FA Cup	League Cup	FL Trophy	Total
4	(France)	Romain Vincelot	MF	1	0	0	0	1
18	(Wales)	Sam Ricketts	DF	1	0	0	0	1
Totals				2	0	0	0	2

=== Captains ===
Correct as of match played on 8 May 2016

No.	Nat.	Player	Pos.	League One	FA Cup	League Cup	FL Trophy	Total
18	(Wales)	Sam Ricketts	DF	43	1	1	1	46
4	(France)	Romain Vincelot	MF	3	0	0	0	3
Totals				46	1	1	1	49

=== Penalties awarded ===
No.	Nat.	Player	Pos.	Date	Opponents	Ground	Success
11	(Scotland)	Jim O'Brien	MF	31 August 2015	Southend United	Ricoh Arena	No
32	(France)	Marc-Antoine Fortuné	FW	3 October 2015	Shrewsbury Town	Ricoh Arena	Yes
20	(England)	Marcus Tudgay	FW	24 October 2015	Swindon Town	The County Ground	No
9	(England)	Adam Armstrong	FW	2 January 2016	Crewe Alexandra	Gresty Road	Yes
9	(England)	Adam Armstrong	FW	30 January 2016	Scunthorpe United	Ricoh Arena	Yes
25	(England)	Jacob Murphy	FW	29 March 2016	Colchester United	Ricoh Arena	No

=== Suspensions served ===
No.	Nat.	Player	Pos.	Date suspended	Reason	Matches missed
7	(Scotland)	John Fleck	MF	17 October 2015	Reached 5 yellow cards	Rochdale (A)
4	(France)	Romain Vincelot	MF	3 November 2015	Reached 5 yellow cards	Northampton Town (H)
18	(Wales)	Sam Ricketts	DF	13 December 2015	1 red card	Oldham Athletic (H)
7	(Scotland)	John Fleck	MF	16 January 2016	Reached 10 yellow cards	Southend United (A); Scunthorpe United (H)
4	(France)	Romain Vincelot	MF	30 January 2016	1 red card	Port Vale (A)

=== Hat-tricks ===
No.	Nat.	Player	Pos.	Date	Opponents	Ground	Result
25	(England)	Jacob Murphy	FW	21 November 2015	Gillingham	Ricoh Arena	4–1
9	(England)	Adam Armstrong	FW	2 January 2016	Crewe Alexandra	Gresty Road	0–5

=== Monthly & weekly awards ===
No.	Nat.	Player	Pos.	Date	Award	Ref
9	(England)	Adam Armstrong	FW	10 August 2015	Football League Team of the Week	
8	(Portugal)	Rúben Lameiras	MF	17 August 2015	Football League Team of the Week	
9	(England)	Adam Armstrong	FW	4 September 2015	Football League One Player of the Month	
25	(England)	Jacob Murphy	FW	21 September 2015	Football League Team of the Week	
23	(England)	Reice Charles-Cook	GK	12 October 2015	Football League Team of the Week	
9	(England)	Adam Armstrong	FW	2 November 2015	Football League Team of the Week	
25	(England)	Jacob Murphy	FW	16 November 2015	Football League Team of the Week	
25	(England)	Jacob Murphy	FW	23 November 2015	Football League Team of the Week	
25	(England)	Jacob Murphy	FW	11 December 2015	Football League One Player of the Month	
14	(England)	Joe Cole	MF	15 February 2016	Football League Team of the Week	

=== End-of-season awards ===
No.	Nat.	Player	Pos.	Date	Award	Ref
9	(England)	Adam Armstrong	FW	21 April 2016	PFA League One Team of the Year	
9	(England)	Adam Armstrong	FW	4 May 2016	CCFC Top Goalscorer	
7	(Scotland)	John Fleck	MF	4 May 2016	CCFC Players' Player of the Season	
9	(England)	Adam Armstrong	FW	4 May 2016	CCFC Goal of the Season	
7	(Scotland)	John Fleck	MF	4 May 2016	CCFC Player of the Season	
9	(England)	Adam Armstrong	FW	4 May 2016	CCFC Young Player of the Season	
18	(Wales)	Sam Ricketts	DF	4 May 2016	CCFC Community Player of the Season	

== Transfers ==
=== Transfers in ===
Player	From	Date	Fee	Ref.
(England) Chris Stokes	(England) Forest Green Rovers	1 July 2015	Free	
(Wales) Sam Ricketts	(England) Wolverhampton Wanderers	6 July 2015	Free	
(France) Romain Vincelot	(England) Leyton Orient	8 July 2015	£25,000	
(Portugal) Rúben Lameiras	(England) Tottenham Hostpur	24 July 2015	Free	
(England) Lateef Elford-Alliyu	(Malta) Valletta	1 September 2015	Free	
(France) Marc-Antoine Fortuné	(England) Wigan Athletic	4 September 2015	Free	
(Sweden) Martin Lorentzson	(Sweden) Åtvidabergs FF	7 December 2015	Free	
(England) Andy Rose	(United States) Seattle Sounders FC	2 January 2016	Free	
(England) Peter Ramage	(India) Kerala Blasters	7 January 2016	Free	
(England) Joe Cole	(England) Aston Villa	7 January 2016	Free	
(Republic of Ireland) Stephen Hunt	(England) Ipswich Town	8 January 2016	Free	
(England) Darius Henderson	(England) Scunthorpe United	5 February 2016	Free	
(Scotland) Kyle Spence	Unattached	15 February 2016	Free	
(England) Bilal Sayoud	(England) Nike Academy	24 March 2016	Free	
(Bulgaria) Vladimir Gadzhev	(Bulgaria) Levski Sofia	24 March 2016	Free	

=== Transfers out ===
Player	To	Date	Fee	Ref.
(Sierra Leone) Al Bangura	(England) St Albans City (Note: Following Bangura's release he joined St Albans City.)	1 July 2015	Free	
(Republic of Ireland) Adam Barton	(England) Portsmouth (Note: Following Barton's release he joined Portsmouth.)	1 July 2015	Free	
(Canada) Simeon Jackson	(England) Barnsley (Note: Following Jackson's release he joined Barnsley.)	1 July 2015	Free	
(England) Shaun Miller	(England) Morecambe (Note: Following Miller's release he joined Morecambe.)	1 July 2015	Free	
(England) Frank Nouble	(China) Tianjin Songjiang (Note: Following Nouble's release he joined Tianjin Songjiang.)	1 July 2015	Free	
(England) Danny Pugh	(England) Bury (Note: Following Pugh's release he joined Bury.)	1 July 2015	Free	
(England) Blair Turgott	(England) Leyton Orient (Note: Following Turgott's release he joined Leyton Orient.)	1 July 2015	Free	
(Scotland) Andy Webster	(Scotland) St Mirren (Note: Following Webster's release he joined St Mirren.)	1 July 2015	Free	
(Scotland) Danny Swanson	(Scotland) Heart of Midlothian (Note: Following Swanson's release he joined Heart of Midlothian.)	1 September 2015	Free	
(Scotland) Kyle Spence	(England) Hampton & Richmond Borough (Note: Following Spence's release he joined Hampton & Richmond Borough.)	1 September 2015	Free	
(England) Lateef Elford-Alliyu	Released	1 January 2016	Free	
(England) James Maddison	(England) Norwich City	1 February 2016	Undisclosed	
(England) Joe Cole	(United States) Tampa Bay Rowdies	4 May 2016	Free	

=== Loans in ===
Player	From	Date from	Date to	Ref.
(England) Adam Armstrong	(England) Newcastle United	28 July 2015	End of season	
(England) Bryn Morris	(England) Middlesbrough	6 August 2015	27 October 2015	
(England) Jacob Murphy	(England) Norwich City	14 August 2015	End of season	
(England) Ryan Kent	(England) Liverpool	10 September 2015	3 January 2016	
(England) Adam Jackson	(England) Middlesbrough	14 September 2015	12 October 2015	
(England) Joe Cole	(England) Aston Villa	16 October 2015	3 January 2016	
(Burundi) Gaël Bigirimana	(England) Newcastle United	16 November 2015	End of season	
(England) Ben Turner	(Wales) Cardiff City	18 November 2015	22 December 2015	
(England) Jack Stephens	(England) Southampton	1 February 2016	End of season	
(England) Baily Cargill	(England) Bournemouth	1 February 2016	12 March 2016	
(England) James Maddison	(England) Norwich City	1 February 2016	End of season	
(England) Jodi Jones	(England) Dagenham & Redbridge	18 March 2016	End of season	

=== Loans out ===
Player	To	Date from	Date to	Ref.
(England) Ivor Lawton	(England) Nuneaton Town	18 August 2015	15 September 2015	
(Wales) George Thomas	(England) Yeovil Town	24 October 2015	3 January 2016	
(Wales) Cian Harries	(England) Cheltenham Town	8 January 2016	6 February 2016	
(England) Ryan Haynes	(England) Cambridge United	13 February 2016	End of season	
(Scotland) Jim O'Brien	(England) Scunthorpe United	15 February 2016	End of season	
(England) Peter Ramage	(England) Leyton Orient	17 March 2016	End of season	

=== Trials ===
Player	From	Date	Signed	Ref.
(Portugal) Rúben Lameiras	(Sweden) Åtvidabergs FF	July 2015	Yes	
(Germany) Roussel Ngankam	(Romania) FC Botoșani	July 2015	No	
(Portugal) Muhamedou	(Portugal) S.C. Braga	July 2015	No	
(England) Bradley Plant	(England) Cheadle Town	July 2015	No	
(England) Lateef Elford-Alliyu	(Malta) Valletta	August 2015	Yes	
(New Zealand) Liam Graham	(Italy) Monza	September 2015	No	
(England) Chris Eagles	(England) Charlton Athletic	October 2015	No	
(Sweden) Martin Lorentzson	(Sweden) Åtvidabergs FF	November 2015	Yes	
(England) Andy Rose	(United States) Seattle Sounders FC	December 2015	Yes	
(England) Peter Ramage	(India) Kerala Blasters	December 2015	Yes	
(Republic of Ireland) Stephen Hunt	(England) Ipswich Town	January 2016	Yes	
(Netherlands) Elson Hooi	(Netherlands) NAC Breda	January 2016	No	
