= Ryan Haynes (footballer) =

English footballer (born 1995)

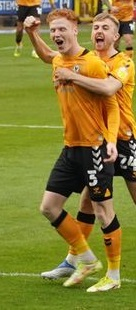
- Haynes celebrating a goal against Port Vale in May 2022.

Personal information
- Full name: Ryan Matthew Haynes
- Date of birth: 27 September 1995 (age 31)
- Place of birth: Northampton, England
- Height: 1.85 m (6 ft 1 in)
- Position: Left back

Team information
- Current team: Brackley Town
- Number: 37

Youth career
- Coventry City

Senior career*
Years	Team	Apps	(Gls)
2012–2018	Coventry City	78	(1)
2016	→ Cambridge United (loan)	10	(0)
2018–2019	Shrewsbury Town	16	(0)
2019–2022	Newport County	103	(5)
2022–2024	Northampton Town	31	(1)
2024–2025	Cheltenham Town	13	(0)
2025–2026	Brackley Town	15	(1)
- * Club domestic league appearances and goals as of 22:53, 26 February 2026 (UTC)

Ryan Matthew Haynes (born 27 September 1995) is an English professional footballer who plays as a left back for National League North club Brackley Town.

== Career ==
=== Coventry City ===
Raised in Daventry, Northamptonshire, Haynes was spotted by Coventry City at a youth tournament in Rugby, Warwickshire. With senior left-backs at the club unavailable through injury and suspension, Haynes made his professional debut on 6 April 2013 in a 1–1 League One playing the whole game of a draw with Brentford. He scored his first goal for Coventry in a 3–2 win over Peterborough United on 25 October 2014.

He scored his second goal for Coventry in a 3–2 EFL Cup win against Portsmouth on 9 August 2016. He scored a brace in an EFL Trophy tie against Wycombe Wanderers on 9 November 2016.

=== Cambridge United (loan) ===
On 13 February 2016, Haynes joined Cambridge United on loan for the remainder of the 2015–16 season.

=== Shrewsbury Town ===
Haynes joined League One side Shrewsbury Town on a two-year contract for an undisclosed fee in June 2018.

=== Newport County ===
On 12 July 2019, Haynes joined League Two side Newport County on a two-year contract for an undisclosed fee. On 3 August 2019 he made his debut for Newport in a 2–2 draw against Mansfield Town On 31 August 2019, he scored his first goal for Newport in a 2–0 win against Forest Green Rovers in League Two. Haynes played for Newport in the League Two playoff final at Wembley Stadium on 31 May 2021 which Newport lost to Morecambe, 1–0 after a 107th minute penalty. In June 2021 Haynes signed a one-year contract extension with Newport County. He was released by Newport County at the end of the 2021–22 season.

=== Northampton Town ===
On 20 June 2022, Haynes agreed to join fellow League Two club Northampton Town on a two-year contract from 1 July when his Newport County contract would expire. He departed the club at the end of the 2023–24 season upon the expiration of his contract.

== Career statistics ==
As of match played on 25 August 2025

Appearances and goals by club, season and competition
Club	Season	League			National Cup		League Cup		Other		Total	
Club	Season	Division	Apps	Goals	Apps	Goals	Apps	Goals	Apps	Goals	Apps	Goals
Coventry City	2012–13	League One	1	0	0	0	0	0	0	0	1	0
Coventry City	2013–14	League One	2	0	0	0	0	0	0	0	2	0
Coventry City	2014–15	League One	26	1	1	0	1	0	3 (Note: Appearances in Football League Trophy)	0	31	1
Coventry City	2015–16	League One	9	0	1	0	0	0	1	0	11	0
Coventry City	2016–17	League One	19	0	1	0	1	1	6	3	27	4
Coventry City	2017–18	League Two	21	0	4	0	0	0	0	0	25	0
Coventry City	Total		78	1	7	0	2	1	10	3	97	5
Cambridge United (loan)	2015–16	League Two	10	0	0	0	0	0	0	0	10	0
Shrewsbury Town	2018–19	League One	16	0	4	0	1	0	4	0	25	0
Newport County	2019–20	League Two	32	1	4	0	1	0	3	0	40	1
Newport County	2020–21	League Two	37	1	3	0	4	0	4 (Note: 3 Appearance in League Two play-offs)	0	48	1
Newport County	2021–22	League Two	34	3	0	0	0	0	1	0	35	3
Newport County	Total		103	5	7	0	5	0	8	0	123	5
Northampton Town	2022–23	League Two	28	1	1	0	1	0	3	0	33	1
Northampton Town	2023–24	League One	3	0	0	0	0	0	2	0	5	0
Northampton Town	Total		31	1	1	0	1	0	5	0	38	1
Cheltenham Town	2024–25	League Two	13	0	0	0	1	0	1	0	15	0
Brackley Town	2025–26	National League	4	1	0	0	–		0	0	4	1
Career total			255	8	19	0	10	1	28	3	312	12

== Honours ==
Coventry City

- EFL Trophy: 2016–17

Northampton Town

- EFL League Two third-place promotion: 2022–23
