= Ivor Lawton =

English footballer

Personal information
- Full name: Ivor James John Lawton
- Date of birth: 5 September 1995 (age 31)
- Place of birth: Coventry, England
- Position: Midfielder

Youth career
- 2002–2013: Coventry City

Senior career*
Years	Team	Apps	(Gls)
2013–2017	Coventry City	0	(0)
2015	→ Nuneaton Town (loan)	3	(0)
2017–2019	Halesowen Town		
2019	Stratford Town	6	(0)
2019–2020	Alvechurch		
2020	RC Warwick		

Managerial career
- 2020: RC Warwick (player-assistant)
- 2021-2022: Coventry United (assistant)
- 2022: Coventry United (caretaker)
- 2022: Coventry United
- * Club domestic league appearances and goals

Ivor James John Lawton (born 5 September 1995) is an English football manager and former player.

== Playing career ==
Lawton joined Coventry City after being spotted playing for Mount Nod Juniors at the age of six. According to the then manager Tony Mowbray, in May 2015 he "earned the right for us to give him an offer of a new contract by his personality, his drive and conviction". He joined Conference North club Nuneaton Town on loan at the start of the 2015–16 season, and made his senior debut playing at right-back in a 1–1 draw with Stockport County at Liberty Way on 22 August. He made his professional debut for Coventry after coming on as a 76th-minute substitute for Conor Thomas in a 0–0 draw with Yeovil Town in a Football League Trophy match at Huish Park on 6 October 2015; Coventry went on to lose the penalty shoot-out 4–3. Manager Tony Mowbray said that Lawton had the potential to be an "iconic warrior figure" at the Ricoh Arena. However, he suffered serious knee ligament damage only a week after his debut and was ruled out of action for the rest of the 2015–16 season. He returned to fitness in October 2016, having spent 12 months on the sidelines. He was released in January 2017.

He had a trial at Port Vale in March 2017.

Lawton joined Halesowen Town in November 2017.

On 11 July 2019, Lawton signed for Southern League Premier Division Central side Stratford Town.

On 24 October 2019, Lawton signed for Alvechurch. In April 2020, he joined RC Warwick as a playing assistant coach.

In November 2021, Lawton joined Coventry United as a First Team Coach. In February 2022, Lawton became caretaker manager, when manager Joe Haggarty was fired. In June 2022, Lawton was appointed manager of the club. Just two months later, in August, Lawton resigned from the position due to personal reasons.

== Style of play ==
Speaking in May 2014, Coventry City Academy manager Richard Stevens said, that Lawton was "competitive, combative and a real aggressive midfield player" who was "a warrior and leader among men". He is also able to play across the defence.

== Statistics ==
As of 15 January 2016

Appearances and goals by club, season and competition
Club	Season	League			FA Cup		EFL Cup		Other		Total	
Club	Season	Division	Apps	Goals	Apps	Goals	Apps	Goals	Apps	Goals	Apps	Goals
Nuneaton Town (loan)	2015–16	Conference North	3	0	0	0	0	0	0	0	3	0
Coventry City	2013–14	League One	0	0	0	0	0	0	0	0	0	0
Coventry City	2014–15	League One	0	0	0	0	0	0	0	0	0	0
Coventry City	2015–16	League One	0	0	0	0	0	0	1 (Note: Appearances in Football League Trophy)	0	1	0
Coventry City	2016–17	EFL League One	0	0	0	0	0	0	0	0	0	0
Coventry City	Total		0	0	0	0	0	0	1	0	0	0
Career total			3	0	0	0	0	0	1	0	4	0
