= Cian Harries =

Welsh footballer (born 1997)

Personal information
- Full name: Cian William Thomas Harries
- Date of birth: 1 April 1997 (age 29)
- Place of birth: Birmingham, England
- Height: 6 ft 1 in (1.86 m)
- Position: Defender

Team information
- Current team: Forest Green Rovers
- Number: 26

Youth career
- –2015: Coventry City

Senior career*
Years	Team	Apps	(Gls)
2015–2017	Coventry City	9	(0)
2016	→ Cheltenham Town (loan)	1	(0)
2017–2020	Swansea City	2	(0)
2019–2020	→ Fortuna Sittard (loan)	8	(1)
2020–2022	Bristol Rovers	47	(1)
2022–2023	Swindon Town	3	(0)
2023–2024	Aldershot Town	41	(7)
2024–2025	Woking	24	(1)
2025–	Forest Green Rovers	13	(0)
2026-	→ Kidderminster Harriers (loan)	0	(0)

International career^{‡}
2013–2014	Wales U17	5	(1)
2014	Wales U19	1	(0)
2017	Wales U20	2	(0)
2017–2018	Wales U21	7	(0)
- * Club domestic league appearances and goals as of 19:39, 23 January 2025 (UTC) ‡ National team caps and goals as of 20:52, 16 October 2018 (UTC)

Cian William Thomas Harries (born 1 April 1997) is a professional footballer who plays as a defender for National League club Forest Green Rovers. He is currently on a season long loan at Kidderminster Harriers for the 2026/2027 season. He is a former Wales Under-21 international.

== Club career ==
On 25 May 2015, Harries signed his first professional contract with Coventry City on a three-year deal to begin on 1 July 2015.

During the 2016 January transfer window, Harries joined Cheltenham Town on an initial one-month loan deal. He made his début a day later coming on in the 81st minute to replace Billy Waters in the 0–0 draw against Boreham Wood. On 16 January 2016, Harries made his first start on 16 January 2016, in the FA Trophy 2–2 draw against Oxford City.

He made his debut for Coventry City, starting against Oldham Athletic on the final day. He played the full game in a 0–2 win.

He made his full home debut against Portsmouth at the Ricoh Arena in the newly named 'EFL Cup'. Coventry ran out 3–2 winners in extra-time.

After making four more appearances for the Sky Blues, Harries signed a new four-year deal keeping him at the football club up till June 2020.

On 4 January 2017, Harries played a trial match for Liverpool U23s against Bangor City in a friendly. He was an unused substitute as Coventry won the 2017 EFL Trophy Final.

He made his debut for Swansea City on 28 August 2018 in the EFL Cup against Crystal Palace FC.

On 27 August 2019, Harries signed with Fortuna Sittard on a season long loan with the option of a permanent move.

=== Bristol Rovers ===
On 31 January 2020, Harries signed with Bristol Rovers for a two-and-a-half-year deal for an undisclosed fee after being recalled from loan.

On the opening day of the 2021–22 League Two season, Harries scored his first goal for the club with an impressive volley from outside of the box to level the scores in an eventual last-minute 2–1 defeat to Mansfield Town. On 19 October 2021, Harries received a career-first red card in a 1–1 draw at Colchester United, receiving a second yellow card when the referee deemed him to be taking too long over a throw-in when Rovers were 1–0 up, just one minute before Colchester equalised. Having failed to make an appearance since 8 February, Harries was released at the end of the season following Rovers' immediate promotion back to League One.

=== Swindon Town ===
On 28 June 2022, Harries agreed to join League Two club Swindon Town on a one-year deal. At the end of the season, he was released having made only seven appearances in all competitions.

=== Aldershot Town ===
On 21 June 2023, Harries signed for National League club Aldershot Town on a one-year deal. Despite having been offered a new contract at the end of the 2023–24 season, he instead opted to depart the club at the end of his existing deal.

=== Woking ===
On 28 May 2024, Harries joined Aldershot's main rivals Woking.

=== Forest Green Rovers ===
On 17 January 2025, Harries signed for fellow National League side Forest Green Rovers for an undisclosed fee.

On 23 June 2026, Harries signed for newly promoted National League side Kidderminster Harriers on a season long loan.

== International career ==
In May 2017, Harries was named in the Wales under-20 squad for the 2017 Toulon Tournament. After remaining on the bench for the tournament opener, Harries was named in the starting line-up in Wales' remaining two group matches against France and Bahrain as Wales were eliminated in the group stage.

In October 2017, Harries made his Wales U21 debut in a 3–1 victory against Liechtenstein.

== Career statistics ==
As of match played 11 January 2025.

Appearances and goals by club, season and competition
Club	Season	League			National Cup		League Cup		Other		Total	
Club	Season	Division	Apps	Goals	Apps	Goals	Apps	Goals	Apps	Goals	Apps	Goals
Coventry City	2015–16	League One	1	0	0	0	0	0	0	0	1	0
Coventry City	2016–17	League One	8	0	2	0	2	0	4 (Note: Appearances in the EFL Trophy)	0	16	0
Coventry City	Total		9	0	2	0	2	0	4	0	17	0
Cheltenham Town (loan)	2015–16	National League	1	0	0	0	0	0	2 (Note: Appearances in FA Trophy)	0	3	0
Swansea City	2017–18	Premier League	0	0	0	0	0	0	—		0	0
Swansea City	2018–19	Championship	2	0	3	0	1	0	2	0	8	0
Swansea City	Total		2	0	3	0	1	0	2	0	8	0
Swansea City U-23s	2017–18	Premier League 2, Div 1	—		—		—		2	0	2	0
Fortuna Sittard (loan)	2019–20	Eredivisie	8	1	0	0	0	0	0	0	8	1
Bristol Rovers	2019–20	League One	3	0	0	0	0	0	0	0	3	0
Bristol Rovers	2020–21	League One	28	0	1	0	0	0	3	0	32	0
Bristol Rovers	2021–22	League Two	16	1	3	0	0	0	2	0	21	1
Bristol Rovers	Total		47	1	4	0	0	0	5	0	56	1
Swindon Town	2022–23	League Two	3	0	1	0	1	0	2	0	7	0
Aldershot Town	2023–24	National League	41	7	5	1	—		2 (Note: Appearance(s) in FA Trophy)	0	48	8
Woking	2024–25	National League	24	1	1	0	—		4 (Note: Two appearances in FA Trophy; Two Appearances in National League Cup)	0	29	1
Career total			134	10	16	1	4	0	24	0	178	11

== Honours ==
Coventry City

- EFL Trophy: 2016–17

Bristol Rovers

- EFL League Two third-place promotion: 2021–22
