= Dion Kelly-Evans =

English footballer (born 1996)

Personal information
- Full name: Dion Jermaine Kelly-Evans
- Date of birth: 21 September 1996 (age 30)
- Place of birth: Coventry, England
- Height: 1.65 m (5 ft 5 in)
- Position: Defender

Youth career
- –2015: Coventry City

Senior career*
Years	Team	Apps	(Gls)
2015–2018	Coventry City	27	(0)
2018–2019	Kettering Town	39	(3)
2019–2022	Notts County	79	(1)
2022–2023	Boreham Wood	13	(0)
2023–2024	Banbury United	10	(0)
2024–2025	Woking	42	(1)
2025–2026	Chester	23	(1)
2026	AFC Telford United	4	(0)
- * Club domestic league appearances and goals as of 13:34, 5 September 2026 (UTC)

Dion Jermaine Kelly-Evans (born 21 September 1996) is a footballer who plays as a defender.

== Career ==
On 21 May 2015, Kelly-Evans signed his first professional contract with Coventry City on a one-year deal which would begin 1 July 2015.

He made his professional début on 8 May 2016, the last game of the 2015–16 season, against Oldham Athletic coming on for Andy Rose at Half-time. He came on as a substitute as Coventry won the 2017 EFL Trophy final.

He was released by Coventry at the end of the 2017–18 season after helping them gain promotion back to EFL League One.

In August 2018 he signed for Kettering Town winning the Evo-Stik League South Premier Central. Also named Chiefs Executive Player Of The Season.

On 1 August 2019, Kelly-Evans signed for Notts County helping them qualify for the play-offs in each of his three seasons on County's quest back to the EFL League Two. Kelly-Evans was released at the end of the 2021–22 season.

On 1 July 2022, Kelly-Evans joined Boreham Wood.

Following a spell with Banbury United, Kelly-Evans returned to the National League, to join Woking on a deal until the end of the 2023–24 campaign. On 17 August 2024, Kelly-Evans received a red card in the 13th minute of a match against Gateshead after a tackle which broke the leg of Greg Olley, ruling him out for the season. On 6 May 2025, it was announced that Kelly-Evans would leave the club upon the expiry of his contract in June. He departed having scored 3 goals in 48 appearances.

On 3 July 2025, Kelly-Evans joined National League North side Chester on a one-year deal.

On 18 August 2026, Kelly-Evans joined National League North club AFC Telford United. Just over two weeks later however, he departed the club by mutual consent.

== Personal life ==
Kelly-Evans is the twin brother of fellow former Coventry City player Devon Kelly-Evans.

== Career statistics ==
As of match played 31 August 2026

Appearances and goals by club, season and competition
Club	Season	League			FA Cup		League Cup		Other		Total	
Club	Season	Division	Apps	Goals	Apps	Goals	Apps	Goals	Apps	Goals	Apps	Goals
Coventry City	2015–16	League One	1	0	0	0	0	0	0	0	1	0
Coventry City	2016–17	League One	24	0	1	0	1	0	6 (Note: Appearances in the Football League Trophy)	0	32	0
Coventry City	2017–18	League Two	2	0	1	0	0	0	3	0	6	0
Coventry City	Total		27	0	2	0	1	0	9	0	39	0
Kettering Town	2018–19	Southern League Premier Division Central	39	3	2	0	—		3 (Note: Two appearances in FA Trophy and one in Southern League Premier Division Central play-offs)	0	44	3
Notts County	2019–20	National League	18	0	1	0	—		5 (Note: Four appearances in FA Trophy and one in National League play-offs)	0	24	0
Notts County	2020–21	National League	33	1	0	0	—		5 (Note: Four appearances in FA Trophy, including 2019–20 FA Trophy semi-final played in September 2020 after being cancelled due to COVID-19 and one appearance in National League play-offs)	0	38	1
Notts County	2021–22	National League	28	0	4	0	—		3 (Note: Two appearances in FA Trophy and one appearance in National League play-offs)	0	35	0
Notts County	Total		79	1	5	0	0	0	13	0	97	1
Boreham Wood	2022–23	National League	13	0	0	0	—		1 (Note: Appearances in the FA Trophy)	0	14	0
Banbury United	2023–24	National League North	10	0	—		—		0	0	10	0
Woking	2023–24	National League	13	0	—		—		—		13	0
Woking	2024–25	National League	29	1	2	0	—		4 (Note: One appearance in FA Trophy; Three Appearances in National League Cup)	2	35	3
Woking	Total		42	1	2	0	—		4	2	48	3
Chester	2025–26	National League North	23	1	2	0	—		0	0	25	1
AFC Telford United	2026–27	National League North	4	0	0	0	—		0	0	4	0
Career total			237	6	13	0	1	0	30	2	281	8

== Honours ==
Coventry City

- EFL Trophy: 2016–17
