= Kyle Spence =

Footballer (born 1997)

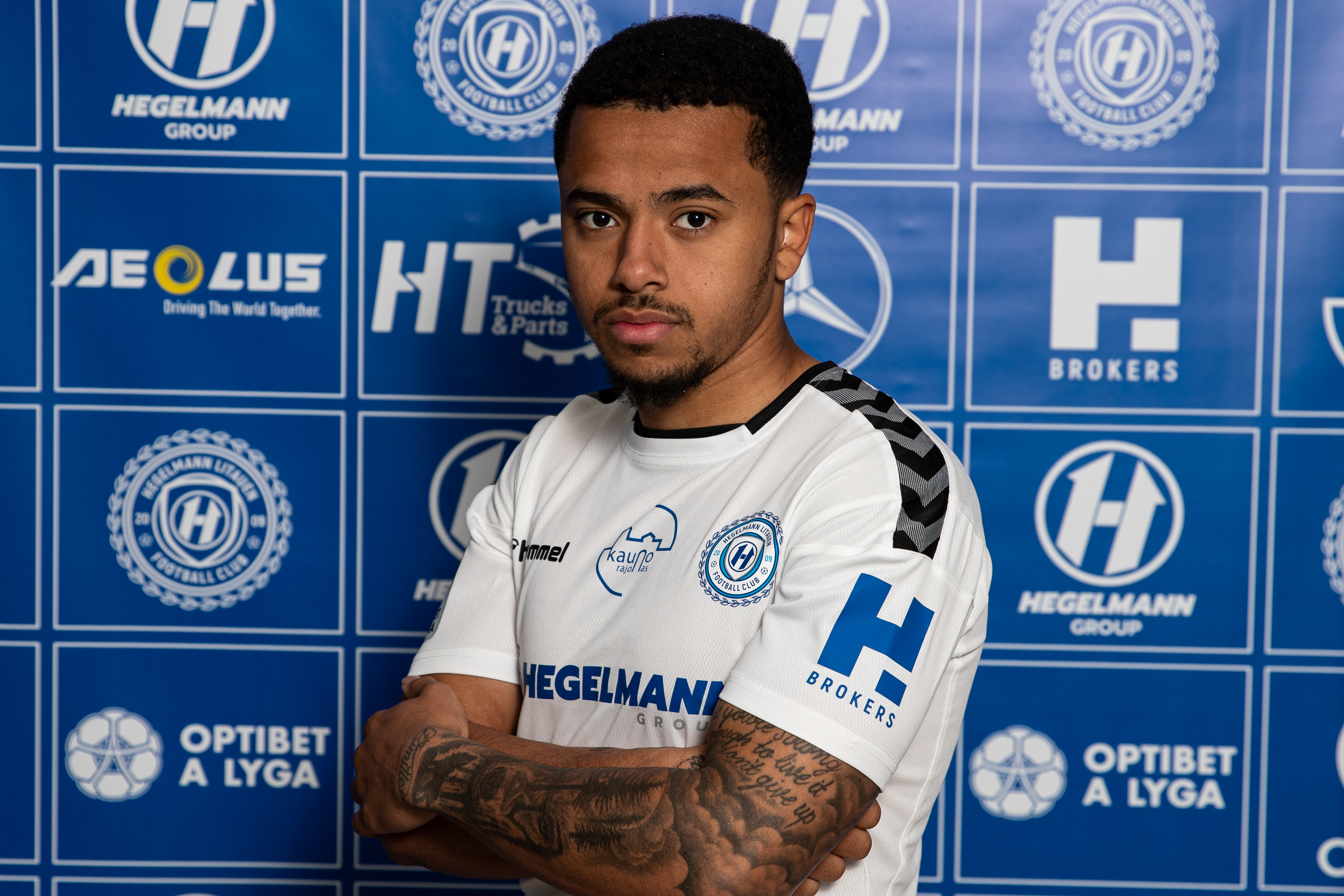
- Spence in 2021 with Hegelmann Litauen

Personal information
- Full name: Kyle Cameron Walter Spence
- Date of birth: 14 January 1997 (age 29)
- Place of birth: Croydon, Surrey, England
- Height: 5 ft 7 in (1.71 m)
- Position: Winger

Team information
- Current team: Maccabi Petah Tikva
- Number: 7

Youth career
- –2014: Crystal Palace
- 2014–2015: Coventry City

Senior career*
Years	Team	Apps	(Gls)
2014–2017	Coventry City	1	(0)
2017	Hampton & Richmond Borough	3	(0)
2017	Kingstonian	2	(0)
2017	East Grinstead Town	2	(0)
2018	Valdres	23	(9)
2019	Alta	26	(4)
2020	Øygarden	16	(0)
2021	Hegelmann Litauen	18	(5)
2022–2023	FSV Frankfurt	16	(0)
2023–2024	Vélez	6	(0)
2024	Gżira United	12	(3)
2024–2025	Coleraine	19	(0)
2025–2026	Karvan	32	(3)
2026–	Maccabi Petah Tikva	1	(0)

International career
2012–2013	Scotland U16	7	(1)
- * Club domestic league appearances and goals as of 11:26, 24 August 2026 (UTC)

Kyle Cameron Walter Spence (born 14 January 1997) is a professional footballer who plays as a winger for Maccabi Petah Tikva in the Israeli Premier League. Born in England, he has represented Scotland at youth international level.

Born in Croydon, Spence began his career with local club Crystal Palace before joining Coventry City who he made his professional debut for later that year. He has since played in Norway, Lithuania and Germany.

== Club career ==
=== Career in England ===
Born in Croydon, Surrey, Spence attended Oasis Academy Shirley Park and trained at Fulham Academy but chose to sign with the Crystal Palace Academy. He played for Croydon Schools FA and Surrey Schools FA U14 county team, which won the English Schools U14 National County Cup final on 10 May 2011 by beating Oxford 4–3 on penalties at Brentford's Griffin Park and featured notable players, such as, Jeremie Boga, Patrick Roberts and Ryan Sweeney. The following year, Spence went on to win the national title on 24 April 2012 with his school, as they beat Ribblesdale High School 3–0 at Derby County's Pride Park Stadium. On 7 May 2013, he won the Crystal Palace Oasis Academy Player of the year. Spence was part of the Crystal Palace Academy squad coached by John Salako and Mark Bright.

Spence joined Coventry City in 2014. He made his professional debut as a substitute on 2 September 2014 in a 1–0 Football League Trophy win over Wycombe Wanderers, coming on to replace Mohamed Coulibaly after 80 minutes. Following his progression with the U18 squad, Spence was offered a professional contract with the club but he did not sign the deal and left Coventry City in the summer of 2015.

After spending time on trial at Millwall, Spence re-signed with Coventry City for the second time in February 2016, until the end of the season. After making his return, Spence played in the club's reserve side for the season and signed a one-year contract extension with Coventry City. Following this, he made his first team appearance of the 2016–17 season, coming on as a 67th-minute substitute, in a 0–0 draw against Shrewsbury Town on 13 August 2016. His second appearance of the season came on 23 August 2016 came against Norwich City in the second round of the League Cup, as the club lost 6–1. Having made two appearances in all competitions, Spence was released at the end of the 2016–17 season.

Spence joined Hampton & Richmond Borough on 4 August 2017. He made his debut for the club, coming on as a 55th-minute substitute, in a 1–1 draw against East Thurrock United on 5 August 2017. Spence went on to make four appearances for Hampton & Richmond Borough before leaving the club to join Kingstonian on 29 August 2017 and then joined East Grinstead Town the following month.

=== Norway ===
On 11 February 2018, Spence moved to Norway, where he signed for Norwegian fourth-tier side Valdres.

On 14 April 2018, Spence scored a hat trick on his league debut against Vestfossen, resulting in a 4–1 win for the club. This was followed up by scoring his fourth goal for Valdres, in a 2–1 win against Brumunddal in the first round of the Norwegian Cup and scored three days later against Skjetten Fotball. Since joining the club, he quickly established himself in the first team. Spence later scored five more goals later in the 2018 season, including a brace against Østsiden. He finished the 2018 season with 27 appearances, 10 goals and 8 assists in all competitions. Following this, Spence did not sign a contract with Valdres, resulting in him leaving the club.

It was reported on 8 February 2019 that Spence went on trial with Norwegian third-tier side Alta. His trial proved successful and he signed for the club on 14 March 2019.

Spence made his debut for Alta in the opening game of the season against Mjølner, coming on as a 79th-minute substitute, in a 3–0 win. On 22 May, he scored his first goal for the club in a 3–0 win over Fløya in the Norwegian Football Cup before scoring his first league goal just over two weeks later in a 2–2 draw with Asker. Since joining Alta, Spence quickly established himself in the starting eleven for the club. On 1 September 2019, he scored twice for Alta in a 3–2 win against Sotra. Three weeks later, Spence scored his fifth goal for the club, in a 2–1 win against Kjelsas IL. By the end of the 2019 season, he had made 29 appearances, scoring five times in all competitions. Following this, Alta offered Spence a new contract to stay at the club.

On 8 January 2020, Spence joined newly formed Norwegian First Division side Øygarden instead. However, due to the pandemic, the season was pushed back to July. On 20 July 2020, he made his Norwegian First Division debut for his new side as a substitute in a 4–4 draw with Raufoss. He went on to make sixteen appearances in all competitions in his first season with the club.

=== Lithuania ===
On 16 April 2021, Spence moved to Lithuania, joining A Lyga side Hegelmann Litauen until the end of the season. He was nominated for A Lyga player of the month for July 2021.

In June 2022, Spence joined German Regionalliga Südwest side FSV Frankfurt on a free transfer.

In August 2023, Spence joined Spanish Segunda Federación side Vélez on a free transfer.

After financial difficulties at the Spanish club, Spence joined Malta Premier League side Gżira United on a free transfer.

On 30 July 2024, Spence joined NIFL Premiership club Coleraine. In January 2025, he scored his first goal for the club in a 5–0 win over Armagh City in the Irish Cup.

=== Karvan ===
On 17 July 2025, Spence signed a one-year contract with Azerbaijan Premier League side Karvan.

=== Maccabi Petah Tikva ===
On 3 June 2026, newly promoted Israeli Premier League club Maccabi Petah Tikva announced the signing of Spence.

== International career ==
Spence was called up by Scotland under-16 in 2012, having been eligible to play for Scotland through his grandparents and made his debut on 21 August 2012 against Latvia U16. He went on to make seven appearances for the under-16s, scoring one goal against Turkey in 2012.

== Personal life ==
Spence's great aunt is Madge Saunders, a Jamaican Christian minister and community worker who was the first woman in the United Church in Jamaica and the Cayman Islands to serve as a parish minister.

== Career statistics ==
As of matches played 24 August 2026

Appearances and goals by club, season and competition
Club	Season	League			National cup		League cup		Other		Total	
Club	Season	Division	Apps	Goals	Apps	Goals	Apps	Goals	Apps	Goals	Apps	Goals
Coventry City	2014–15	League One	0	0	0	0	0	0	1 (Note: Appearances in Football League Trophy)	0	1	0
Coventry City	2015–16	League One	0	0	0	0	0	0	0	0	0	0
Coventry City	2016–17	League One	1	0	0	0	1	0	0	0	2	0
Coventry City	Total		1	0	0	0	1	0	1	0	3	0
Hampton & Richmond Borough	2017–18	National League South	3	0	0	0	0	0	0	0	3	0
Kingstonian	2017–18	Isthmian Premier	2	0	1	0	0	0	0	0	3	0
East Grinstead Town	2017–18	Isthmian D1 South	2	0	0	0	0	0	1 (Note: Appearances in FA Trophy)	0	3	0
Valdres	2018	3. divisjon	23	9	4	1	0	0	0	0	27	10
Alta	2019	2. divisjon	26	4	3	1	0	0	0	0	29	5
Øygarden	2020	OBOS-ligaen	16	0	0	0	0	0	0	0	16	0
Hegelmann Litauen	2021	A Lyga	18	5	2	0	0	0	0	0	20	5
FSV Frankfurt	2022–23	Regionalliga Südwest	16	0	0	0	0	0	1 (Note: Appearances in Hessian Cup)	0	17	0
Vélez	2023–24	Segunda Federación	6	0	0	0	0	0	0	0	6	0
Gżira United	2023–24	Maltese Premier League	12	3	3	1	0	0	0	0	15	4
Coleraine	2024–25	NIFL Premiership	19	0	1	1	1	0	1 (Note: Appearances in NIFL Premiership Conference League playoff)	0	21	1
Karvan	2025–26	Azerbaijan Premier League	32	3	2	0	0	0	0	0	34	3
Maccabi Petah Tikva	2026–27	Israeli Premier League	1	0	0	0	5	0	0	0	6	0
Career total			177	24	16	4	7	0	4	0	204	28

== Honours ==
FSV Frankfurt

- Hessian Cup winners: 2022–23
