= Aaron Phillips (footballer) =

English association football player (born 1993)

Personal information
- Full name: Aaron Owen Phillips
- Date of birth: 20 November 1993 (age 32)
- Place of birth: Warwick, England
- Height: 5 ft 7 in (1.71 m)
- Position: Defender

Team information
- Current team: St Ives Town

Youth career
- –2012: Coventry City

Senior career*
Years	Team	Apps	(Gls)
2012–2016	Coventry City	53	(1)
2013	→ Nuneaton Town (loan)	17	(1)
2016–2018	Northampton Town	22	(1)
2018–2019	Kidderminster Harriers	4	(1)
2019–	St Ives Town	12	(0)
- * Club domestic league appearances and goals as of 01:40, 19 April 2020 (UTC)

Aaron Owen Phillips (born 20 November 1993) is an English footballer who plays as a defender for Northern Premier League Division One Midlands club St Ives Town. He has played in the English Football League for Coventry City and Northampton Town.

== Career ==
=== Coventry City ===
On 31 January 2013, Phillips joined Conference Premier club Nuneaton Town on loan for a month, with a view of gaining more experience, He made his Nuneaton Town debut on 2 February 2013 in a 3–2 loss to Stockport County. Phillips was joined at Nuneaton by fellow Sky Blue Lee Burge, both Phillips and Burge had their loan spells extended until the end of the season and were influential in saving Nuneaton from relegation.

Phillips made his Coventry City debut as a substitute on 3 August 2013 in a 3–2 League One loss to Crawley Town, coming on to replace Jordan Willis after 82 minutes. Phillips scored his first goal for the club on 19 October in a 1–1 draw against Wolverhampton Wanderers. Aaron made his first start for Coventry City in their 1–0 victory in League One against Walsall in October 2013.

On 1 January 2014, Phillips signed a new contract to keep him at Coventry City until the summer of 2016.

=== Northampton Town ===
On 3 June 2016, Phillips signed for Northampton Town newly promoted to League One. He made his league debut for Northampton on 6 August 2016 in a 1–1 home draw against Flettwood Town. He scored his first goal for Northampton on 14 March 2017 in a 2–1 home win against Port Vale. His goal came in the 63rd minute, and was assisted by John-Joe O'Toole. This was the first goal of the game.

=== Brackley Town ===
On 28 August 2020, Phillips signed for Brackley Town for the 20/21 Season in the National League North.

== Personal life ==
Phillips' father is former Wales international footballer David Phillips who a member of the Coventry City team that won the 1987 FA Cup Final.

== Career statistics ==
As of match played 19 April 2020

Appearances and goals by club, season and competition
Club	Season	League			FA Cup		League Cup		Other		Total	
Club	Season	Division	Apps	Goals	Apps	Goals	Apps	Goals	Apps	Goals	Apps	Goals
Coventry City	2012–13	League One	0	0	0	0	0	0	0	0	0	0
Coventry City	2013–14	League One	11	1	1	0	0	0	1 (Note: Appearance(s) in Football League Trophy)	0	13	1
Coventry City	2014–15	League One	19	0	0	0	0	0	3	2	22	2
Coventry City	2015–16	League One	23	0	1	0	1	0	1	0	26	0
Coventry City	Total		53	1	2	0	1	0	5	2	61	3
Nuneaton Town (loan)	2012–13	Conference Premier	17	1	0	0	0	0	0	0	17	1
Northampton Town	2016–17	League One	20	1	1	0	2	0	3 (Note: Appearances in EFL Trophy)	0	26	1
Northampton Town	2017–18	League One	2	0	0	0	1	0	0	0	3	0
Northampton Town	Total		22	1	1	0	3	0	3	0	29	1
Kidderminster Harriers	2018–19	National League North	4	1	0	0	—		0	0	4	1
St Ives Town	2019–20	Southern League Premier Division Central	12	0	2	0	—		3 (Note: Two appearances in Southern League Cup, one in FA Trophy)	0	17	0
Brackley Town	2020-	National League North										
Career total			108	4	5	0	4	0	11	2	128	6
