= Jack Finch (footballer, born 1996) =

English footballer

Personal information
- Full name: Jack Jonathon Finch
- Date of birth: 6 August 1996 (age 30)
- Place of birth: Fenny Compton, England
- Position: Midfielder

Youth career
- Coventry City

Senior career*
Years	Team	Apps	(Gls)
2013–2017	Coventry City	16	(0)
2017	Kidderminster Harriers	4	(0)
2017–2018	Banbury United	44	(0)
2018–2019	Brackley Town	0	(0)
2019	Banbury United	2	(0)
2019–2020	Daventry Town	2	(0)
2020–	Banbury United		
- * Club domestic league appearances and goals as of 13:12, 19 December 2017 (UTC)

Jack Jonathon Finch (born 6 August 1996) is an English professional footballer who plays as a midfielder for Daventry Town.

== Career ==
=== Coventry City ===
Born in Fenny Compton, England, Finch began his career at Sunday league side Fenny Compton Colts and one day, when he was playing as a right-back in a match against Southam United, he was scouted by Coventry City, leading him to join the club when he was nine-year old. While at the academy, Finch started out playing as a right-back before switching to centre-back then into midfield.

After progressing the ranks of the academy, he was called up by the first team in July 2013, but did not travel in the club's pre-season tour. Although he was a regular for the Under-21s side for most of the 2013–14 season, Finch was offered a two-year professional contract. Shortly after being offered a new contract, Finch was called by the first team against Bradford City, where he appeared as an unused substitute. He went on to make two appearances as an unused substitute against Wolverhampton Wanderers and Sheffield United. At the end of the 2013–14 season, he signed a two-year professional contract with them.

Finch made his professional debut starting on 13 August 2014 in a 2–1 League Cup loss to Cardiff City. However, in a match against Crewe Alexandra on 11 October 2014, Finch was sent-off for a second bookable offence, in a 2–1 loss. Despite the sending-off, Finch was given a handful of first team appearances between November and February. However, in late-March, he returned to the U21 side for the rest of the season after finding his first team opportunities limited. Despite a setback, Finch went on to make 16 League appearances in the 2014–15 season.

However, the 2015–16 season saw Finch not featured for the first team and did not make a single appearance that season, due to competitions around the midfield position. As the 2015–16 season progressed, Finch began to suffer his own setback when he suffered an injury that left him long-term. It wasn't until February 2016 when he returned from injury.

In the 2016–17 season, Finch was included in the first team squad for the pre-season tour. Finch then made his first appearance in over a year, in the first round of League Cup, in a 3–2 win over Portsmouth on 9 August 2016. Finch appeared three times in the EFL Trophy. At the end of the 2016–17 season, Finch was released by the club when his contract came to an end.

== Career statistics ==
As of match played 9 December 2017

Appearances and goals by club, season and competition
Club	Season	League			FA Cup		League Cup		Other		Total	
Club	Season	Division	Apps	Goals	Apps	Goals	Apps	Goals	Apps	Goals	Apps	Goals
Coventry City	2014–15	League One	16	0	1	0	1	0	3 (Note: Appearances in the Football League Trophy)	0	21	0
Coventry City	2015–16	League One	0	0	0	0	0	0	0	0	0	0
Coventry City	2016–17	League One	0	0	0	0	1	0	3 (Note: Appearances in the EFL Trophy)	0	4	0
Coventry City	Coventry total		16	0	1	0	2	0	6	0	25	0
Kidderminster Harriers	2017–18	National League North	3	0	0	0	—		0	0	3	0
Banbury United	2017–18	SFL - Premier Division	5	0	0	0	—		1 (Note: Appearance in the FA Trophy)	0	6	0
Career total			19	0	1	0	2	0	6	0	28	0
