= Jordan Brown (German footballer) =

German footballer

Personal information
- Full name: Jordan Jeremiah Brown
- Date of birth: 12 November 1991 (age 34)
- Place of birth: Hamburg, Germany
- Height: 1.75 m (5 ft 9 in)
- Position: Midfielder

Team information
- Current team: TuS Dassendorf

Youth career
- –2010: Eintracht Norderstedt

Senior career*
Years	Team	Apps	(Gls)
2010–2011	Eintracht Norderstedt	27	(7)
2011–2013	Hamburger SV II	14	(1)
2013–2015	FC Wil 1900	51	(9)
2015–2016	Grasshoppers	2	(0)
2015–2016	→ FC Wohlen (loan)	19	(0)
2016–2022	Eintracht Norderstedt	103	(0)
2022–	TuS Dassendorf	0	(0)
- * Club domestic league appearances and goals as of 1 July 2022

Jordan Jeremiah Brown (born 12 November 1991) is a German footballer who plays as a midfielder for TuS Dassendorf.

== Career ==
Brown trialled with Coventry City in July 2016.
