= Devon Kelly-Evans =

English footballer (born 1996)

Personal information
- Full name: Devon Kelly-Evans
- Date of birth: 21 September 1996 (age 30)
- Place of birth: Coventry, England
- Position: Midfielder

Team information
- Current team: Harborough Town

Youth career
- –2015: Coventry City

Senior career*
Years	Team	Apps	(Gls)
2015–2018	Coventry City	14	(1)
2017	→ Nuneaton Town (loan)	4	(0)
2017	→ Nuneaton Town (loan)	7	(2)
2018–2021	Nuneaton Borough	19	(0)
2021–2023	Leamington	85	(8)
2023–2024	Quorn	18	(2)
2024	Leamington	19	(2)
2024–2025	Kettering Town	33	(2)
2025–	Harborough Town	0	(0)
- * Club domestic league appearances and goals as of 22:39, 24 July 2025 (UTC)

Devon Jerome Kelly-Evans (born 21 September 1996) is an English footballer who plays as a midfielder for National League North club Harborough Town.

== Career ==
Kelly-Evans made his professional debut as a substitute on 23 August 2016 in a 6-1 Football League Cup defeat to Norwich City, coming on to replace Ben Stevenson after 67 minutes. Towards the end of the 2016–17 season, Devon Kelly-Evans was sent out on loan to Nuneaton Town, where he made 11 appearances and scored two goals.

On 12 September 2017, Devon Kelly-Evans made his league debut for Coventry City, replacing Stuart Beavon in the 87th minute of a 2–0 win over Carlisle United. He then scored his first senior goal for the Sky Blues in a 2–0 over Exeter City on 23 September 2017.

He was released by Coventry at the end of the 2017–18 season.

He signed for Nuneaton Borough on 15 June 2018 on a two-year deal. In August 2021 he moved up a league to local Warwickshire side Leamington. On 4 May 2022 Kelly-Evans scored the first goal for Leamington as they won the Birmingham Senior Cup, beating Stourbridge 3-1 in the final.

In November 2023, Kelly-Evans joined Northern Premier League Midlands Division club Quorn. He returned to Leamington in March 2024.

He joined Kettering Town FC before the 24/25 season.

== Career statistics ==
=== Club ===
As of match played 30 January 2018

Appearances and goals by club, season and competition
Club	Season	League			FA Cup		League Cup		Other		Total	
Club	Season	Division	Apps	Goals	Apps	Goals	Apps	Goals	Apps	Goals	Apps	Goals
Coventry City	2016–17	League One	0	0	0	0	1	0	0	0	1	0
Coventry City	2017–18	League Two	14	1	1	0	1	0	1 (Note: Appearance in EFL Trophy)	0	17	1
Coventry City	Coventry City		14	1	1	0	2	0	1	0	18	1
Nuneaton Town (loans)	2016–17	National League North	11	2	0	0	~	~	0	0	11	2
Career totals			25	3	1	0	2	0	1	0	29	3

== Personal life ==
Kelly-Evans is the twin brother of professional footballer Dion Kelly-Evans.
