= Jordan Willis (footballer) =

English footballer (born 1994)

Personal information
- Full name: Jordan Kenneth Willis
- Date of birth: 24 August 1994 (age 32)
- Place of birth: Coventry, England
- Height: 5 ft 11 in (1.80 m)
- Position: Centre back

Team information
- Current team: Maidenhead United
- Number: 37

Youth career
- –2011: Coventry City

Senior career*
| Years | Team | Apps | (Gls) |
| 2011–2019 | Coventry City | 179 | (4) |
| 2019–2022 | Sunderland | 50 | (2) |
| 2023 | Wycombe Wanderers | 9 | (0) |
| 2023–2026 | Northampton Town | 58 | (1) |
| 2026– | Maidenhead United | 0 | (0) |

International career
| 2012 | England U18 | 1 | (0) |
| 2013 | England U19 | 1 | (0) |
- * Club domestic league appearances and goals as of 15 October 2026 (UTC)

Jordan Kenneth Willis (born 24 August 1994) is an English professional footballer who plays as a centre back for Maidenhead United.

He spent 8 years in the English Football League with Coventry City, and has also played for Sunderland, Wycombe Wanderers and Northampton Town .

== Club career ==
=== Coventry City ===
Willis was born in Coventry, West Midlands. He made his first-team debut for Coventry City as a substitute on 5 November 2011 in a 4–2 Championship loss to Southampton, coming on to replace James McPake after 64 minutes. At the age of 17 years and 72 days he became the tenth youngest Coventry City player of all time. He made his first start of the following season on 28 August 2012, in a 3–2 win against Birmingham City in the League Cup.

He established himself in the first-team towards the end of the 2013–14 season in the right-back position. A change in formation to a three-man defence saw Willis become a first-choice player for Coventry City at the start of the following season. On 11 October, Jordan Willis captained the Sky Blues for the first time in their game against Crewe Alexandra.

He scored his first goal for Coventry in an EFL Trophy tie against West Ham Under-23s on 30 August 2016. He then scored his first league goal for the club in a 2–0 win against Chesterfield on 1 November 2016.

Willis left Coventry at the end of 2018–19 season after rejecting the offer of a new contract.

=== Sunderland ===
Willis signed for League One club Sunderland on 13 July 2019 on a two-year contract. Willis scored his first goal for Sunderland on 17 August 2019, a header from a Grant Leadbitter corner, in a 2–1 home victory against Portsmouth. Sunderland announced on 25 May 2022, that he will be released when his contract runs out on 30 June 2022.

=== Wycombe Wanderers ===
Willis signed for Wycombe on 11 February 2023, until the end of the season.

=== Northampton Town ===
After over five months without a club, on 7 October 2023 Willis signed for Northampton Town on a short-term contract lasting initially until January 2024. In December, he agreed a contract extension with Northampton Town until the end of the season. He left the club at the end of the 2025–26 season.

=== Maidenhead United ===
Willis signed for Maidenhead United on 10 November 2026.

== International career ==
In February 2012 he was called up to the England under-18 team by manager Noel Blake. He made his debut on 7 March 2012 in a 3–0 win against Poland in Crewe. He made his England under-19 debut on 5 February 2013, in a 3–1 win against Denmark.

== Career statistics ==
As of match played 14 November 2026

Appearances and goals by club, season and competition
| Club | Season | League | | | FA Cup | | League Cup | | Other | | Total | |
| Club | Season | Division | Apps | Goals | Apps | Goals | Apps | Goals | Apps | Goals | Apps | Goals |
|---|---|---|---|---|---|---|---|---|---|---|---|---|
| Coventry City | 2011–12 | Championship | 3 | 0 | 0 | 0 | 0 | 0 | — | | 3 | 0 |
| Coventry City | 2012–13 | League One | 1 | 0 | 1 | 0 | 1 | 0 | 0 | 0 | 3 | 0 |
| Coventry City | 2013–14 | League One | 28 | 0 | 1 | 0 | 1 | 0 | 1 (Note: Appearance(s) in Football League Trophy) | 0 | 31 | 0 |
| Coventry City | 2014–15 | League One | 34 | 0 | 1 | 0 | 1 | 0 | 4 | 0 | 40 | 0 |
| Coventry City | 2015–16 | League One | 4 | 0 | 0 | 0 | 0 | 0 | 0 | 0 | 4 | 0 |
| Coventry City | 2016–17 | League One | 36 | 3 | 3 | 0 | 2 | 0 | 5 (Note: Appearances in EFL Trophy) | 2 | 46 | 5 |
| Coventry City | 2017–18 | League Two | 35 | 0 | 4 | 1 | 0 | 0 | 3 (Note: One appearance in EFL Trophy, two appearances and one goal in League Two play-offs) | 1 | 42 | 2 |
| Coventry City | 2018–19 | League One | 38 | 1 | 1 | 0 | 0 | 0 | 0 | 0 | 39 | 1 |
| Coventry City | Total | | 179 | 4 | 11 | 1 | 5 | 0 | 13 | 3 | 208 | 8 |
| Sunderland | 2019–20 | League One | 35 | 2 | 1 | 0 | 2 | 0 | 2 | 0 | 40 | 2 |
| Sunderland | 2020–21 | League One | 15 | 0 | 0 | 0 | 1 | 0 | 4 | 0 | 20 | 0 |
| Sunderland | 2021–22 | League One | 0 | 0 | 0 | 0 | 0 | 0 | 0 | 0 | 0 | 0 |
| Sunderland | Total | | 50 | 2 | 1 | 0 | 3 | 0 | 6 | 0 | 60 | 2 |
| Wycombe Wanderers | 2022–23 | League One | 9 | 0 | 0 | 0 | 0 | 0 | 0 | 0 | 9 | 0 |
| Northampton Town | 2023–24 | League One | 27 | 0 | 1 | 0 | 0 | 0 | 0 | 0 | 28 | 0 |
| Northampton Town | 2024–25 | League One | 15 | 0 | 0 | 0 | 0 | 0 | 1 | 0 | 16 | 0 |
| Northampton Town | 2025–26 | League One | 16 | 1 | 1 | 0 | 1 | 0 | 6 | 0 | 24 | 1 |
| Northampton Town | Total | | 58 | 1 | 2 | 0 | 1 | 0 | 7 | 0 | 68 | 1 |
| Maidenhead United | 2026–27 | National League South | 0 | 0 | 0 | 0 | 0 | 0 | 2 (Note: One appearance and one goal in FA Trophy, one appearance in Berks & Bucks Senior Cup) | 1 | 2 | 1 |
| Career total | | | 296 | 7 | 13 | 1 | 8 | 0 | 26 | 4 | 347 | 12 |

== Honours ==
Coventry City

- EFL Trophy: 2016–17
- EFL League Two play-offs: 2018

Sunderland AFC

- EFL Trophy: 2020–21
