= 2013–14 Coventry City F.C. season =

Coventry City
2013–14 season
- Chairman: Tim Fisher
- Manager: Steven Pressley
- Stadium: Sixfields Stadium
- League One: 18th
- FA Cup: Fourth round vs Arsenal
- League Cup: First round vs Leyton Orient
- Football League Trophy: Second round vs Leyton Orient
- Top goalscorer: League: Callum Wilson 21; All: Callum Wilson 22
- Highest home attendance: 4,905 vs Peterborough United – Football League One – 26 December 2013
- Lowest home attendance: 1,214 vs Hartlepool United – FA Cup – 17 December 2013
- Average home league attendance: 2,287
Home colours	Away colours

The 2013–14 season is Coventry City's 94th season in The Football League and their second consecutive season in League One. In addition to League One, the Sky Blues also entered the Football League Cup and FA Cup in the first rounds. They also entered the Football League Trophy in the second round after being awarded a bye for the first round.

== Review and events ==
=== Monthly events ===
This is a list of the significant events to occur at the club during the 2013–14 season, presented in chronological order. This list does not include transfers or match results.

June:

- 17 – Coventry City were drawn to play Leyton Orient away in the first round of the Football League Cup.
- 19 – Coventry City's 2013–14 season fixtures in League One were revealed.
- 28 – Coventry City defender Aaron Phillips pens a new one-year deal with the club, commencing on 1 July 2013.
- 28 – Callum Wilson and Billy Daniels have penned new deals at the club. Wilson has penned a one-year deal and Daniels a two-year deal.
- 28 – Leon Lobjoit, Ben Maund, Louis Garner and Lewis Rankin all sign one-year professional deals at the club.

July:

- 3 – Coventry City have agreed to groundshare with Northampton Town at the Sixfields Stadium for the next three years.
- 4 – Coventry City were awarded a bye for the first round of the 2013–14 Football League Trophy.
- 8 – The Football League has approved the application from Otium Entertainment Group to see Coventry City groundshare with Northampton Town to play at Sixfields Stadium for an initial period of three seasons.
- 10 – Coventry City's second pre-season friendly and first on the tour of the Netherlands against Go Ahead Eagles has been cancelled due to the high risk of football hooliganism.
- 15 – Coventry City confirmed a replacement pre-season fixture to replace the cancelled match against Go Ahead Eagles, The Sky Blues would take on German side TSV Wachtendonk.
- 16 – Coventry City's home Football League One clash against Sheffield United has been selected to be shown live on Sky Sports on Sunday 13 October 2013.

August:

- 2 – Otium Entertainment Group were awarded the Golden Share for the 2013–14 season but club handed ten-point deduction from the Football League.
- 15 – Coventry City scooped up the LMA Performance of the Week award for the 5–4 win over Bristol City.

September:

- 3 – Cyrus Christie was named London Supporters Club Player of the Month.
- 12 – Callum Wilson won the August goal of the month award for his second of two goals in the 4–4 draw with Preston North End on 25 August 2013.
- 13 – Jordan Willis signed a new two-year contract, with an option of a further year.
- 16 – Jordan Clarke signed a new two-year contract, with an option of a further year.
- 18 – Callum Wilson won the August player of the month.
- 19 – Coventry City have teamed up with medical charity Grace Research Fund who will adorn Sky Blues shirts for the next three months.
- 19 – Coventry City will wear the new 2013/14 home shirt for the first time for the League One clash against Sheffield United on 13 October 2013. The match will also be shown live on Sky Sports.

October:

- 4 – Steven Pressley handed a first team squad number to 16-year-old academy player James Maddison.
- 16 – Franck Moussa won the September goal of the month award for his long-range effort in the 3–2 loss against Port Vale at Vale Park.
- 24 – Callum Wilson won the September player of the month.
- 30 – Coventry City's FA Cup first round away tie against AFC Wimbledon was chosen for live television screening on BT Sport. The match will be played on Friday 8 November 2013.
- 31 – Callum Wilson signs a new contract to keep him at the club until June 2015 with the option to extend to 2016.

November:

- 1 – Callum Wilson was named October's PFA Fan's Player of the Month for League One.
- 7 – Coventry City handed a squad number to Academy player Courtney Baker-Richardson ahead of the FA Cup fixture against AFC Wimbledon.
- 12 – Conor Thomas signs a new contract to keep him at the club until June 2016.
- 12 – Franck Moussa won the October goal of the month award for his delightful chip against Leyton Orient in the 3–1 win on Tuesday, 22 October.
- 22 – Ryan Haynes signs a new contract to keep him at the club until June 2017.
- 22 – Billy Daniels signs a new contract to keep him at the club until June 2016.
- 26 – Coventry City hand squad number to Ivor Lawton ahead of the League One fixture against Rotherham United.

December:

- 10 – Coventry City fan appointed as head of the CCFC Stadium Forum which will consult on the new stadium design.
- 10 – Coventry City Academy and Alan Higgs Centre reach agreement on a permanent return.
- 11 – Chris Maguire won the November goal of the month award for his second free-kick against Milton Keynes Dons in the 3–1 win on Saturday, 30 November.
- 11 – John Fleck won the November Player of the Month award.

January:

- 1 – Aaron Phillips signs a new contract to keep him at the club until June 2016.

February:

- 20 – Franck Moussa won the CCFC January Player of the Month vote with 68% beating Joe Murphy in second with 22% of the vote.
- 20 – Franck Moussa won the CCFC January Goal of the Month vote with 75.8% beating Carl Baker in second spot.

== Squad details ==
=== Players info ===
As of 4 April 2014

No.	Pos.	Name	Nat.	Place of birth	Date of birth	Club apps.	Club goals	Int. caps	Int. goals	Previous club	Date joined	Contract end	Fee
1	GK	Joe Murphy	IRL	Dublin	21 August 1981 (age 45)	131	0	2	0	Scunthorpe United	1 July 2011	30 June 2014	Free
2	DF	Cyrus Christie	ENG	Coventry	30 September 1992 (age 34)	97	2	–	–	Academy	1 June 2010	30 June 2014	Trainee
3	DF	Blair Adams	ENG	South Shields	18 September 1991 (age 35)	52	0	–	–	Sunderland	17 January 2013	30 June 2015	Undisclosed
4	DF	Andy Webster	SCO	Dundee	23 April 1982 (age 44)	35	2	28	1	Heart of Midlothian	9 August 2013	30 June 2015	Free
6	MF	Conor Thomas	ENG	Coventry	29 October 1993 (age 33)	77	1	–	–	Academy	1 June 2010	30 June 2016	Trainee
7	MF	John Fleck	SCO	Glasgow	24 August 1991 (age 35)	72	3	–	–	Rangers	4 July 2012	30 June 2015	Free
8	MF	Carl Baker	ENG	Whiston	26 December 1982 (age 43)	155	20	–	–	Stockport County	8 January 2010	30 June 2015	Undisclosed
9	FW	Nathan Eccleston	ENG	Newton Heath	30 December 1990 (age 35)	3	0	–	–	Blackpool	26 March 2014	31 May 2014	Loan
10	FW	Nathan Delfouneso	ENG	Birmingham	2 February 1991 (age 35)	9	1	–	–	Aston Villa	30 January 2014	31 May 2014	Loan
11	MF	Dylan McGeouch	SCO	Glasgow	15 January 1993 (age 33)	5	0	–	–	Celtic	30 January 2014	31 May 2014	Loan
12	MF	David Prutton	ENG	Kingston upon Hull	12 September 1981 (age 45)	2	0	–	–	Sheffield Wednesday	27 March 2014	31 May 2014	Loan
13	GK	Lee Burge	ENG	Hereford	9 January 1993 (age 33)	–	–	–	–	Academy	1 June 2010	30 June 2014	Trainee
14	MF	Franck Moussa	BEL	Brussels	24 July 1989 (age 37)	77	19	–	–	Leicester City	21 September 2012	30 June 2014	Free
15	DF	Danny Seaborne	ENG	Barnstaple	5 March 1987 (age 39)	18	1	–	–	Yeovil Town	14 January 2014	30 June 2015	Free
16	MF	Adam Barton	IRL	(England) Clitheroe	7 January 1991 (age 35)	36	3	–	–	Preston North End	6 August 2012	30 June 2015	Undisclosed
17	MF	Billy Daniels	ENG	Bristol	3 July 1994 (age 32)	22	3	–	–	Academy	1 June 2011	30 June 2016	Trainee
18	DF	Aaron Phillips	ENG	Warwick	20 November 1993 (age 32)	11	1	–	–	Academy	1 June 2011	30 June 2016	Trainee
19	DF	Jordan Willis	ENG	Coventry	24 August 1994 (age 32)	26	0	–	–	Academy	1 June 2011	30 June 2015	Trainee
20	FW	Callum Wilson	ENG	Coventry	27 February 1992 (age 34)	43	22	–	–	Academy	1 June 2009	30 June 2015	Trainee
24	DF	Jordan Clarke	ENG	Coventry	18 November 1991 (age 34)	107	3	–	–	Academy	1 June 2008	30 June 2015	Trainee
25	DF	Stuart Urquhart	SCO	Glasgow	26 March 1995 (age 31)	–	–	–	–	Rangers	18 September 2013	30 June 2016	Free
26	MF	Mark Marshall	JAM	Manchester Parish	5 May 1987 (age 39)	9	0	–	–	Barnet	3 February 2014	30 June 2014	Free
27	MF	Anton Robinson	ENG	Harrow	17 February 1986 (age 40)	3	0	–	–	Huddersfield Town	24 March 2014	31 May 2014	Loan
30	MF	Louis Garner	ENG	Manchester	31 October 1994 (age 32)	3	0	–	–	Academy	1 June 2011	30 June 2014	Trainee
31	DF	Ryan Haynes	ENG	Northampton	27 September 1995 (age 31)	3	0	–	–	Academy	27 March 2013	30 June 2017	Trainee
33	FW	Ben Maund	ENG	Kidderminster	7 May 1995 (age 31)	–	–	–	–	Academy	1 June 2013	30 June 2014	Trainee
34	MF	Lewis Rankin	SCO	(England) Coventry	2 July 1995 (age 31)	–	–	–	–	Academy	1 June 2013	30 June 2014	Trainee
35	GK	Alex Gott	SCO	(England) Bedworth	30 September 1995 (age 31)	–	–	–	–	Academy	1 June 2013	30 June 2014	Trainee
36	MF	James Maddison	ENG	Coventry	23 November 1996 (age 29)	–	–	–	–	Academy	4 October 2013	30 June 2014	Trainee
37	MF	George Thomas	WAL	(England) Leicester	24 March 1997 (age 29)	1	0	–	–	Academy	25 October 2013	30 June 2014	Trainee
38	FW	Courtney Baker-Richardson	ENG	Coventry	5 December 1995 (age 30)	–	–	–	–	Academy	7 November 2013	30 June 2014	Trainee
39	MF	Ivor Lawton	ENG	Coventry	5 September 1995 (age 31)	–	–	–	–	Academy	26 November 2013	30 June 2014	Trainee
40	MF	Jack Finch	ENG	Fenny Compton	6 August 1996 (age 30)	–	–	–	–	Academy	1 April 2014	30 June 2014	Trainee

== Matches ==
=== Preseason friendlies ===
13 July 2013	Nuneaton Town	1–4	Coventry City	Nuneaton
15:00	Moult 9'	report	Wilson 18'; L. Clarke 54', 85' (pen.); Moussa 86'	Stadium: Triton Showers Community Arena; Attendance: 1,595

16 July 2013	TSV Wachtendonk (Germany)	0–6	Coventry City	Wachtendonk
19:30		report	Lobjoit 6'; Moussa 25', 44'; Baker 35'; L. Clarke 42'; Maund 87'	Stadium: Sportpark Laerheide

18 July 2013	Willem II (Netherlands)	1–0	Coventry City	Netherlands
18:30	Messaoud 58'	report		Stadium: Behind closed doors

20 July 2013	Heracles Almelo (Netherlands)	1–1	Coventry City	Tubbergen
13:30	Navrátil 33'	report	Baker 3'	Stadium: Sportpark De Grote Moat

23 July 2013	Cheltenham Town	0–2	Coventry City	Cheltenham
19:00		report	L. Clarke 36'; Christie 73'	Stadium: Whaddon Road; Attendance: 872 (199 Sky Blue Army); Referee: S Hooper

24 July 2013	Fleetwood Town	2–0	Coventry City	Fleetwood
19:45	Ball 81'; Sarcevic 86'	report		Stadium: Highbury Stadium; Attendance: 1,455

26 July 2013	Mansfield Town	2–3	Coventry City	Mansfield
19:30	Todd 22'; Clucas 48'	report	Baker 39' (pen.), 90+3' (pen.); Beevers 63' (o.g.)	Stadium: One Call Stadium; Attendance: 1,012 (121 Sky Blue Army)

27 July 2013	Oxford United	1–0	Coventry City	Oxford
15:00	Constable 46'	report		Stadium: Kassam Stadium; Attendance: 1,557 (301 Sky Blue Army)

=== League One ===
3 August 2013 1	Crawley Town	3–2	Coventry City	Crawley
15:00	Proctor 13'; Walsh 20'; Jones 83'	report	Wilson 58'; Moussa 80'	Stadium: Broadfield Stadium; Attendance: 3,454 (1,080 Sky Blue Army); Referee: Lee Collins

11 August 2013 2	Coventry City	5–4	Bristol City	Northampton
15:00	L. Clarke 27' (pen.); Wilson 43', 75' (yellow card) 90'; Daniels 45', 87'; Thomas (yellow card) 61'	report	Baldock 55', 74'; Emmanuel-Thomas 62'; Elliott 85'; Moloney (yellow card) 21'; Pack (yellow card) 34'; Flint (yellow card) 48'; Williams (yellow card) 52'	Stadium: Sixfields Stadium; Attendance: 2,204; Referee: David Coote

17 August 2013 3	Carlisle United	0–4	Coventry City	Carlisle
15:00	Black (yellow card) 1'; Feely (yellow card) 88'	report	L. Clarke 4', 65'; Moussa 6' (yellow card) 58'; Daniels 31' (yellow card) 33'; Thomas (yellow card) 42'	Stadium: Brunton Park; Attendance: 4,072 (439 Sky Blue Army); Referee: Paul Tierney

25 August 2013 4	Coventry City	4–4	Preston North End	Northampton
15:00	L. Clarke 25'; Wilson 70', 83'; Manset 90+5' (yellow card) 78'	report	Clarke 10'; Wright 64' (yellow card) 84'; Byrom 87'; Humphrey 90+2'	Stadium: Sixfields Stadium; Attendance: 2,068 (562 away); Referee: Robert Madley

31 August 2013 5	Shrewsbury Town	1–1	Coventry City	Shrewsbury
15:00	Bradshaw 48'	report	Wilson 4'; Christie (yellow card) 49'; Thomas (yellow card) 86'	Stadium: New Meadow; Attendance: 6,541 (1,574 Sky Blue Army); Referee: Steve Rushton

8 September 2013 6	Coventry City	2–0	Colchester United	Northampton
15:00	Wilson 38', 59'	report		Stadium: Sixfields Stadium; Attendance: 1,789; Referee: Stephen Martin

15 September 2013 7	Coventry City	2–1	Gillingham	Northampton
15:00	L. Clarke 2'; Moussa 83'; Adams (yellow card) 51'	report	McDonald 10'; Nelson (yellow card) 74'; Barrett (yellow card) 90'	Stadium: Sixfields Stadium; Attendance: 2,046 (371 away); Referee: Trevor Kettle

21 September 2013 8	Port Vale	3–2	Coventry City	Burslem
15:00	Pope 40'; Loft 60'; Birchall (yellow card) 73' (goal) 83'	report	Wilson 35'; Moussa 43'; Adams (yellow card) 45+3'	Stadium: Vale Park; Attendance: 9,218 (3,148 Sky Blue Army); Referee: Michael Naylor

29 September 2013 9	Coventry City	0–2	Brentford	Northampton
15:00	Wilson (yellow card) 65'	report	Donaldson 22'; Taylor 68'	Stadium: Sixfields Stadium; Attendance: 2,650; Referee: Carl Boyeson

5 October 2013 10	Stevenage	0–1	Coventry City	Stevenage
15:00	Tansey (yellow card) 10'; Deacon (yellow card) 75'	report	L. Clarke 33'; Thomas (yellow card) 90+4'	Stadium: Broadhall Way; Attendance: 3,325 (Sky Blue Army ??); Referee: Graham Scott

13 October 2013 11	Coventry City	3–2	Sheffield United	Northampton
15:00	L. Clarke 6', 49'; Wilson 65'; Webster (yellow card) 38'; Willis (yellow card) 75'; Adams (yellow card) 88'	report	Taylor 62', 80'; Maguire (yellow card) 45'; Doyle (yellow card) 89'	Stadium: Sixfields Stadium; Attendance: 2,078 (Sky Blue Army ??); Referee: Mike Dean

19 October 2013 12	Wolverhampton Wanderers	1–1	Coventry City	Wolverhampton
15:00	Griffiths 68'; Henry (yellow card) 85'	report	Phillips 86' (yellow card) 90'; J. Clarke (yellow card) 67'	Stadium: Molineux; Attendance: 22,939 (3,400 Sky Blue Army); Referee: Fred Graham

22 October 2013 13	Coventry City	3–1	Leyton Orient	Northampton
19:45	Baker 10'; Moussa 67' (yellow card) 62'; L. Clarke 77'; Fleck (yellow card) 90+6'	report	Lasimant 90+3'; Vincelot (yellow card) 27'; Clarke (yellow card) 64'	Stadium: Sixfields Stadium; Attendance: 2,386 (758 away); Referee: James Adcock

26 October 2013 14	Walsall	0–1	Coventry City	Bescot
15:00	Chambers (yellow card) 67'	report	Moussa 54'; Fleck (yellow card) 41'	Stadium: Bescot Stadium; Attendance: 6,519 (2,138 Sky Blue Army); Referee: Gavin Ward

2 November 2013 15	Coventry City	3–0	Notts County	Northampton
15:00	L. Clarke 47', 58'; Wilson 64'; Baker (yellow card) 45+4'; Fleck (yellow card) 85'	report	Labadie (yellow card) 27'; Haynes (red card) 45'; Sheehan (yellow card) 56'	Stadium: Sixfields Stadium; Attendance: 2,693 (Away 543); Referee: Lee Collins

17 November 2013 16	Bradford City	3–3	Coventry City	Bradford
15:30	Wells 17', 28', 90+5'; Jones (yellow card) 30'	report	Webster 2'; L. Clarke 7'; Wilson 42' (yellow card) 86'; Thomas (yellow card) 45+3'; Adams (yellow card) 71'	Stadium: Coral Windows Stadium; Attendance: 14,322 (Sky Blue Army ???); Referee: Kevin Friend

23 November 2013 17	Coventry City	1–5	Tranmere Rovers	Northampton
14:00	Baker 76' (pen.); Webster (yellow card) 63'	report	Lowe 4', 44', 54'; Kirby 37'; Wallace 89'; Holmes (yellow card) 76'; Taylor (red card) 78'	Stadium: Sixfields Stadium; Attendance: 1,815 (away 178); Referee: Darren Deadman

26 November 2013 18	Coventry City	0–3	Rotherham United	Northampton
19:45	Thomas (yellow card) 13'; Phillips (yellow card) 15'	report	Dicko 58'; Revell 70'; Agard 70' (pen.)	Stadium: Sixfields Stadium; Referee: Jonathan Moss

30 November 2013 19	Milton Keynes Dons	1–3	Coventry City	Denbigh
15:00	Williams 45+2' (pen.); Gleeson (yellow card) 39'; Potter (yellow card) 55'	report	Dagnall 66'; Maguire 86', 90' (yellow card) 87'; Wilson (yellow card) 60'	Stadium: Stadium mk Attendance: 14,988 (6,781 Sky Blue Army); Referee: Jeremy Simpson

14 December 2013 20	Coventry City	2–2	Crewe Alexandra	Northampton
15:00	Moussa 36'; Wilson 56' (pen.); Maguire (yellow card) 84'	report	Hitchcock 14'; Aneke 66'; Davis (yellow card) 41'	Stadium: Sixfields Stadium; Attendance: 1,618 (??? away); Referee: Steve Bratt

21 December 2013 21	Swindon Town	2–1	Coventry City	Swindon
15:00	Kasim 77', (yellow card) 88'; Storey 87'; Foderingham (yellow card) 90+3'	report	L. Clarke 51'; Fleck (yellow card) 41'; Christie (yellow card) 44'; Thomas (yellow card) 53'; Baker (yellow card) 60'; Dagnall (yellow card) 90+3'	Stadium: The County Ground; Attendance: 9,291(1,219 Sky Blue Army); Referee: Gavin Ward

26 December 2013 22	Coventry City	4–2	Peterborough United	Northampton
12:00	L. Clarke 45+1', 48'; Moussa 80'; Wilson 90+1'	report	Jeffers 21'; Tomlin 45+3'	Stadium: Sixfields Stadium; Attendance: 4,905 (??? away); Referee: Brendan Malone

29 December 2013 23	Coventry City	1–1	Oldham Athletic	Northampton
15:00	Baker 73'; Christie (yellow card) 8'; Fleck (yellow card) 28'	report	Clarke-Harris 45+3'; Oxley (yellow card) 32'; Winchester (yellow card) 42'; Mellor (yellow card) 83'	Stadium: Sixfields Stadium; Attendance: 3,347 (524 away); Referee: Dean Whitestone

1 January 2014 24	Rotherham United	1–3	Coventry City	Rotherham
15:00	Skarz 35'; Morgan (red card) 70'	report	Baker 71' (pen.), 90+14'; Christie 85' (yellow card) 90'	Stadium: New York Stadium; Attendance: 9,154 (1,198 Sky Blue Army); Referee: Gary Sutton

12 January 2014 25	Coventry City	2–2	Crawley Town	Northampton
15:00	Sadler 41' (o.g.); Moussa 85', (yellow card) 77'	report	Proctor 83'; Drury 87'	Stadium: Sixfields Stadium; Attendance: 2,128 (192 away fans); Referee: James Linnington

18 January 2014 26	Preston North End	1–1	Coventry City	Preston
15:00	Davies 54', (red card) 88'; Wiseman (yellow card) 23'; Gallagher (yellow card) 84'; Buchanan (yellow card) 90+2'	report	Moussa 90+7'; Murphy (yellow card) 90+5'	Stadium: Deepdale; Attendance: 10,671 (932 Sky Blue Army); Referee: Keith Wright

28 January 2014 27	Leyton Orient	2–0	Coventry City	Leyton
19:45	Cox 57'; Mooney 81'	report	Baker (yellow card) 21'	Stadium: Matchroom Stadium; Attendance: 5,077 (??? Sky Blue Army); Referee: Michael Bull

4 February 2014 28	Bristol City	1–2	Coventry City	Bristol
19:45	Burns 82'; Wagstaff (yellow card) 85'	report	Moussa 7'; Webster 25'; Marshall (yellow card) 75'; Barton (yellow card) 89'	Stadium: Ashton Gate; Attendance: 11,272 (686 Sky Blue Army); Referee: Andy Woolmer

8 February 2014 29	Notts County	3–0	Coventry City	Nottingham
15:00	Mullins 13'; Spencer 33'; Sheehan 87' (pen.); Roberts (yellow card) 60'	report	Baker (yellow card) 38'	Stadium: Meadow Lane; Attendance: 8,149 (3,866 Sky Blue Army); Referee: Carl Berry

18 February 2014 30	Coventry City	1–2	Carlisle United	Northampton
19:45	Moussa 32'; Webster (yellow card) 72'	report	Noble 55'; Byrne 70'; Meppen-Walter (yellow card) 48'	Stadium: Sixfields Stadium; Attendance: 1,603 (191 away); Referee: Steve Bratt

22 February 2014 31	Tranmere Rovers	3–1	Coventry City	Birkenhead
15:00	Lowe 12' (pen.); Wallace 48', (yellow card) 35'; Kirby 64', (yellow card) 83'; Taylor (yellow card) 75'	report	Petrasso 79'; Fleck (yellow card) 90+2'	Stadium: Prenton Park; Attendance: 5,279 (912 Sky Blue Army); Referee: Robert Madley

2 March 2014 32	Coventry City	0–0	Shrewsbury Town	Northampton
15:00		report		Stadium: Sixfields Stadium; Attendance: 1,966 (391 away); Referee: Darren Deadman

5 March 2014 33	Coventry City	2–1	Walsall	Northampton
19:45	Wilson 22'; Delfouneso 84'; Webster (yellow card) 72'; J. Clarke (yellow card) 90+1'	report	Benning 54'; A. Chambers (yellow card) 40'; Featherstone (yellow card) 58'; J. Chambers (yellow card) 74'	Stadium: Sixfields Stadium; Attendance: 1,637 (496 away); Referee: Richard Clark

8 March 2014 34	Colchester United	2–1	Coventry City	Colchester
15:00	Sears 5'; Massey 26'; Wilson (yellow card) 85'	report	Wilson 45+1'; Delfouneso (yellow card) 90+6'	Stadium: Colchester Community Stadium; Attendance: 4,426 (797 Sky Blue Army); Referee: Trevor Kettle

11 March 2014 35	Gillingham	4–2	Coventry City	Gillingham
19:45	Akinfenwa 25' (pen.), 75' (pen.), (yellow card) 9'; Weston 56'; Hessenthaler 90'; Legge (yellow card) 83'; Fagan (yellow card) 89'	report	Wilson 50' (pen.), (yellow card) 73'; Baker 83' (pen.); Seaborne (red card) 24'; Adams (yellow card) 32'; Moussa (yellow card) 59'; Webster (yellow card) 90+2'	Stadium: Priestfield Stadium; Attendance: 5,447 (268 Sky Blue Army); Referee: Darren Shedrake

16 March 2014 36	Coventry City	2–2	Port Vale	Northampton
15:00	J. Clarke 81'; Wilson 90+2'; Akpom (yellow card) 33'; Fleck (yellow card) 89'	report	Loft 1'; Williamson 74'; Knott (yellow card) 69'; Lines (yellow card) 71'; Grimmer (yellow card) 80'; Pope (yellow card) 81'	Stadium: Sixfields Stadium; Attendance: 1,627 (345 away); Referee: Rob Lewis

22 March 2014 37	Brentford	3–1	Coventry City	Brentford
15:00	Donaldson 17'; Trotta 20'; McCormack 48', (yellow card) 90+1'	report	Wilson 6'; Baker (yellow card) 75'; Thomas (yellow card) 81'	Stadium: Griffin Park; Attendance: 8,572 (1,306 Sky Blue Army); Referee: Gavin Ward

26 March 2014 38	Coventry City	1–0	Stevenage	Northampton
19:45	Seaborne 67'; Fleck (yellow card) 57'	report	Doughty (yellow card) 90+2'	Stadium: Sixfields Stadium; Attendance: 1,697 (437 Away); Referee: Tim Robinson

29 March 2014 39	Crewe Alexandra	1–2	Coventry City	Crewe
15:00	J. Clarke 62' (o.g.)	report	Wilson 27', 81'; Prutton (yellow card) 8'; Moussa (yellow card) 37'; Robinson (yellow card) 60'; Thomas (yellow card) 64'; J. Clarke (yellow card) 72'; Marshall (yellow card) 83'; Baker (yellow card) 85'	Stadium: Alexandra Stadium; Attendance: 5,042 (1,142 Sky Blue Army); Referee: Andy Davies

1 April 2014 40	Coventry City	0–0	Bradford City	Northampton
19:45		report		Stadium: Sixfields Stadium; Attendance: 1,673 (327 away); Referee: Lee Probert

5 April 2014 41	Coventry City	1–2	Milton Keynes Dons	Northampton
15:00	Baker 57'; Wilson (yellow card) 81'; Fleck (yellow card) 90+1'	report	Alli 39'; McLeod 66', (yellow card) 90+3'	Stadium: Sixfields Stadium; Attendance: 2,782 (1,051 away); Referee: Graham Horwood

12 April 2014 42	Peterborough United	1–0	Coventry City	Peterborough
15:00	Ntlhe 6'; Ajose (yellow card) 45'	report		Stadium: London Road Stadium; Attendance: 6,617 (1,097 Sky Blue Army); Referee: Darren Sheldrake

18 April 2014 43	Coventry City	1–2	Swindon Town	Northampton
15:00	Fleck 43'; J. Clarke (yellow card) 86'	report	Pritchard 8'; M. Smith 90+4', (yellow card) 51'; McEveley (yellow card) 51'	Stadium: Sixfields Stadium; Attendance: 3,091 (1,092 away); Referee: Chris Sarginson

21 April 2014 44	Oldham Athletic	0–0	Coventry City	Oldham
15:00		report		Stadium: Boundary Park; Attendance: 4,633 (578 Sky Blue Army); Referee: Jeremy Simpson

26 April 2014 45	Coventry City	1–1	Wolverhampton Wanderers	Northampton
15:00	Delfouneso 86'; Christie (yellow card) 59'	report	Edwards 84'	Stadium: Sixfields Stadium; Attendance: 4,252 (2,170 away); Referee: Brendan Malone

3 May 2014 46	Sheffield United	2–1	Coventry City	Sheffield
15:00	Flynn 62'; Davies 73'; Collins (yellow card) 76'	Report	Thomas (yellow card) 21'; Delfouneso 39'; Fleck (yellow card) 45+2'; Christie (yellow card) 67'	Stadium: Bramall Lane; Attendance: 20,723; Referee: Darren Bond

=== FA Cup ===
8 November 2013 First Round	AFC Wimbledon (L2)	1–3	Coventry City	Norbiton
19:45	Smith 54'	report	Wilson 57'; Baker 60'; Kennedy 70' (o.g.); Christie (yellow card) 68'	Stadium: Cherry Red Records Stadium; Attendance: 3,379; Referee: Darren Drysdale

7 December 2013 Second Round	Hartlepool United (L2)	1–1	Coventry City	Hartlepool
15:00	Monkhouse 78'	report	Baker 12'; Seaborne (yellow card) 57'; Daniels (yellow card) 73'	Stadium: Victoria Park; Attendance: 2,898 (541 Sky Blue Army); Referee: Robert Madley

17 December 2013 Second Round; Replay	Coventry City	2–1	Hartlepool United (L2)	Northampton
19:45	L. Clarke 36', 90+3'	report	Baldwin 88', (yellow card) 82'; Monkhouse (yellow card) 90+4'	Stadium: Sixfields Stadium; Attendance: 1,214 (225 away); Referee: Keith Hill

4 January 2014 Third Round	Barnsley (CH)	1–2	Coventry City	Barnsley
15:00	O'Brien 19'; Dawson (yellow card) 29'	report	Moussa 78', (yellow card) 32'; L. Clarke 89', (yellow card) 30'; Christie (yellow card) 43'	Stadium: Oakwell; Attendance: 7,439 (2,632 Sky Blue Army); Referee: Carl Boyeson

24 January 2014 Fourth Round	Arsenal (PR)	4–0	Coventry City	London
19:45	Podolski 15', 27'; Giroud 84'; Cazorla 89'; Wilshire (yellow card) 39'	report		Stadium: Emirates Stadium; Attendance: 59,491 (5,100 Sky Blue Army); Referee: Robert Madley

=== League Cup ===
6 August 2013 First Round	Leyton Orient (L1)	3–2	Coventry City	Leyton
19:45	Lisbie 26', 89'; Cox 37'; Cuthbert (yellow card) 78'	report	Baker 22', (red card) 56'; Moussa 59'; L. Clarke (yellow card) 42'; Fleck (yellow card) 63'	Stadium: Matchroom Stadium; Attendance: 2,871 (487 Sky Blue Army); Referee: Dean Whitestone

=== Football League Trophy ===
8 October 2013 Second Round	Leyton Orient (L1)	0–0 (4–2 p)	Coventry City	Leyton
19:30	Cuthbert (yellow card) 19'	report	Fleck (yellow card) 69'; Wilson (yellow card) 86'	Stadium: Matchroom Stadium; Attendance: 2,151 (489 Sky Blue Army); Referee: Tim Robinson
	Penalties
	Mooney (penalty scored); Omozusi (penalty scored); Sawyer (penalty scored); James (penalty scored)		L. Clarke (penalty scored); Moussa (penalty missed); J. Clarke (penalty scored); Fleck (penalty missed)

== League One data ==
=== League table ===
A total of 24 teams contest the division: 17 sides remaining in the division from last season, three relegated from the Championship, and four promoted from League Two.

Pos	Team	Pld	W	D	L	GF	GA	GD	Pts
16	Colchester United	46	13	14	19	53	61	−8	53
17	Gillingham	46	15	8	23	60	79	−19	53
18	Coventry City	46	16	13	17	74	77	−3	51 (Note: On 2 August Coventry City were deducted 10 points for exiting administration without a CVA.)
19	Crewe Alexandra	46	13	12	21	54	80	−26	51
20	Notts County	46	15	5	26	64	77	−13	50

Updated to match(es) played on 3 May 2014. Source: BBC Sport
Rules for classification: 1) Points; 2) Goal difference; 3) Number of goals scored

=== Results summary ===
Overall								Home						Away					
Pld	W	D	L	GF	GA	GD	Pts	W	D	L	GF	GA	GD	W	D	L	GF	GA	GD
46	16	13	17	74	77	−3	51	9	8	6	41	39	+2	7	5	11	33	38	−5

Last updated: 3 May 2014.
Source: CCFC League One Results

=== Round by round ===
Round	1	2	3	4	5	6	7	8	9	10	11	12	13	14	15	16	17	18	19	20	21	22	23	24	25	26	27	28	29	30	31	32	33	34	35	36	37	38	39	40	41	42	43	44	45	46
Ground	A†	H	A	H	A	H	H	A	H	A	H	A	H	A	H	A	H	H	A	H	A	H	H	A	H	A	A	A	A	H	A	H	H	A	A	H	A	H	A	H	H	A	H	A	H	A
Result	L	W	W	D	D	W	W	L	L	W	W	D	W	W	W	D	L	L	W	D	L	W	D	W	D	D	L	W	L	L	L	D	W	L	L	D	L	W	W	D	L	L	L	D	D	L
Position	24	24	24	24	24	23	20	20	22	18	16	17	14	13	11	12	12	13	11	11	13	12	12	10	11	11	12	10	12	13	13	13	12	12	14	15	17	16	13	13	13	15	17	17	17	18

Updated to match(es) played on 3 May 2014. Source: League One Results
A = Away; H = Home; W = Win; D = Draw; L = Loss
Notes: † 10 points were deducted from Coventry City's league total prior to the playing of the round 1 match.

=== Scores overview ===
Opposition	Home Score	Away Score	Double
Bradford City	0–0	3–3	
Brentford	0–2	1–3	Brentford Do Double
Bristol City	5–4	2–1	Coventry City Do Double
Carlisle United	1–2	4–0	
Colchester United	2–0	1–2	
Crawley Town	2–2	2–3	
Crewe Alexandra	2–2	2–1	
Gillingham	2–1	2–4	
Leyton Orient	3–1	0–2	
Milton Keynes Dons	1–2	3–1	
Notts County	3–0	0–3	
Oldham Athletic	1–1	0-0	
Peterborough United	4–2	0-1	
Port Vale	2–2	2–3	
Preston North End	4–4	1–1	
Rotherham United	0–3	3–1	
Sheffield United	3–2	2-1	Sheffield United Do Double
Shrewsbury Town	0–0	1–1	
Stevenage	1–0	1–0	Coventry City Do Double
Swindon Town	1-2	1–2	Swindon Town Do Double
Tranmere Rovers	1–5	1–3	Tranmere Rovers Do Double
Walsall	2–1	1–0	Coventry City Do Double
Wolverhampton Wanderers	0-0	1–1	

== Season statistics ==
=== Appearances and goals ===
As of 16 April 2014

No.	Pos	Nat	Player	Total		League One		FA Cup		League Cup		League Trophy	
No.	Pos	Nat	Player	Apps	Goals	Apps	Goals	Apps	Goals	Apps	Goals	Apps	Goals
1	GK	(Republic of Ireland) IRL	Joe Murphy	53	0	46	0	5	0	1	0	1	0
2	DF	(England) ENG	Cyrus Christie	39	1	32+1	1	5	0	1	0	0	0
3	DF	(England) ENG	Blair Adams	43	0	34+2	0	5	0	1	0	1	0
4	DF	(Scotland) SCO	Andy Webster	46	2	39+1	2	4+1	0	0	0	1+0	0
6	MF	(England) ENG	Conor Thomas	48	0	39+3	0	4	0	1	0	1	0
7	MF	(Scotland) SCO	John Fleck	48	1	40+2	1	4	0	1	0	1	0
8	MF	(England) ENG	Carl Baker	42	10	31+5	7	5	2	1	1	0	0
9	FW	(England) ENG	Nathan Eccleston (on loan from Blackpool)	7	0	4+3	0	0	0	0	0	0	0
10	FW	(England) ENG	Nathan Delfouneso (on loan from Aston Villa)	13	2	7+6	2	0	0	0	0	0	0
11	MF	(Scotland) SCO	Dylan McGeouch (on loan from Celtic)	8	0	0+8	0	0	0	0	0	0	0
12	MF	(England) ENG	David Prutton (on loan from Sheffield Wednesday)	7	0	7	0	0+0	0	0	0	0	0
13	GK	(England) ENG	Lee Burge	0	0	0	0	0	0	0	0	0	0
14	MF	(Belgium) BEL	Franck Moussa	46	14	36+3	12	5	1	1	1	1	0
15	DF	(England) ENG	Danny Seaborne (initially on loan from Yeovil Town)	24	1	18+3	1	3	0	0	0	0	0
16	MF	(Republic of Ireland) IRL	Adam Barton (on loan at Fleetwood Town)	17	0	5+9	0	1+1	0	0	0	1	0
17	MF	(England) ENG	Billy Daniels	24	3	10+9	3	3+1	0	0	0	0+1	0
18	DF	(England) ENG	Aaron Phillips	13	1	3+8	1	0+1	0	0	0	0+1	0
19	DF	(England) ENG	Jordan Willis	30	0	20+7	0	1	0	1	0	1	0
20	FW	(England) ENG	Callum Wilson	40	22	36	21	2	1	1	0	1	0
24	DF	(England) ENG	Jordan Clarke	45	1	38+1	1	3+1	0	1	0	1	0
25	DF	(Scotland) SCO	Stuart Urquhart	0	0	0	0	0	0	0	0	0	0
26	MF	(Jamaica) JAM	Mark Marshall	13	0	5+8	0	0	0	0	0	0	0
27	MF	(England) ENG	Anton Robinson (on loan from Huddersfield Town)	6	0	5+1	0	0	0	0	0	0	0
30	MF	(England) ENG	Louis Garner	3	0	0+3	0	0	0	0	0	0	0
31	DF	(England) ENG	Ryan Haynes	2	0	1+1	0	0	0	0	0	0	0
33	FW	(England) ENG	Ben Maund	0	0	0	0	0	0	0	0	0	0
34	MF	(Scotland) SCO	Lewis Rankin	0	0	0	0	0	0	0	0	0	0
35	GK	(Scotland) SCO	Alex Gott	0	0	0	0	0	0	0	0	0	0
36	MF	(England) ENG	James Maddison	0	0	0	0	0	0	0	0	0	0
37	MF	(Wales) WAL	George Thomas	1	0	1	0	0	0	0	0	0	0
38	FW	(England) ENG	Courtney Baker-Richardson (on loan at Tamworth)	1	0	0	0	0+1	0	0	0	0	0
39	MF	(England) ENG	Ivor Lawton	0	0	0	0	0	0	0	0	0	0
40	MF	(England) ENG	Jack Finch	0	0	0	0	0	0	0	0	0	0
Players who left before the season ended:
9	FW	(England) ENG	Chuba Akpom (on loan from Arsenal)	6	0	5+1	0	0	0	0	0	0	0
9	FW	(England) ENG	Leon Clarke	29	18	22+1	15	4	3	1	0	1	0
10	FW	(France) FRA	Mathieu Manset	9	1	0+9	1	0	0	0	0	0	0
12	MF	(Scotland) SCO	Chris Maguire (on loan from Sheffield Wednesday)	3	2	1+2	2	0	0	0	0	0	0
12	FW	(Curaçao) CUW	Denzel Slager	4	0	0+3	0	1	0	0	0	0	0
21	FW	(England) ENG	Chris Dagnall (on loan from Barnsley)	7	1	5+2	1	0	0	0	0	0	0
21	FW	(Jamaica) JAM	Jamar Loza (on loan from Norwich City)	1	0	0+1	0	0	0	0	0	0	0
27	MF	(Canada) CAN	Michael Petrasso (on loan from Queens Park Rangers)	7	1	7	1	0	0	0	0	0	0
32	MF	(England) ENG	Leon Lobjoit	0	0	0	0	0	0	0	0	0	0
	FW	(Northern Ireland) NIR	Rory Donnelly (on loan from Swansea City)	0	0	0	0	0	0	0	0	0	0

=== Goalscorers ===
No.	Flag	Pos	Name	League One	FA Cup	League Cup	Football League Trophy	Total
20	(England)	FW	Callum Wilson	21	1	0	0	22
9	(England)	FW	Leon Clarke	15	3	0	0	18
14	(Belgium)	MF	Franck Moussa	12	1	1	0	14
8	(England)	MF	Carl Baker	7	2	1	0	10
17	(England)	MF	Billy Daniels	3	0	0	0	3
4	(Scotland)	DF	Andy Webster	2	0	0	0	2
10	(England)	FW	Nathan Delfouneso	2	0	0	0	2
12	(Scotland)	MF	Chris Maguire	2	0	0	0	2
			Own goal	1	1	0	0	2
2	(England)	DF	Cyrus Christie	1	0	0	0	1
7	(Scotland)	MF	John Fleck	1	0	0	0	1
10	(France)	FW	Mathieu Manset	1	0	0	0	1
15	(England)	DF	Danny Seaborne	1	0	0	0	1
18	(England)	DF	Aaron Phillips	1	0	0	0	1
21	(England)	FW	Chris Dagnall	1	0	0	0	1
24	(England)	DF	Jordan Clarke	1	0	0	0	1
27	(Canada)	MF	Michael Petrasso	1	0	0	0	1

=== Assists ===
No.	Flag	Pos	Name	League One	FA Cup	League Cup	Football League Trophy	Total
8	(England)	MF	Carl Baker	9	1	0	0	10
7	(Scotland)	MF	John Fleck	5	2	0	0	7
9	(England)	FW	Leon Clarke	5	0	0	0	5
14	(Belgium)	MF	Franck Moussa	3	2	0	0	5
2	(England)	DF	Cyrus Christie	4	0	0	0	4
3	(England)	DF	Blair Adams	4	0	0	0	4
20	(England)	FW	Callum Wilson	3	0	1	0	4
26	(Jamaica)	MF	Mark Marshall	4	0	0	0	4
1	(Republic of Ireland)	GK	Joe Murphy	0	0	1	0	1
6	(England)	MF	Conor Thomas	1	0	0	0	1
9	(England)	FW	Chuba Akpom	1	0	0	0	1
12	(Scotland)	MF	Chris Maguire	1	0	0	0	1
17	(England)	MF	Billy Daniels	1	0	0	0	1
24	(England)	DF	Jordan Clarke	1	0	0	0	1
27	(Canada)	MF	Michael Petrasso	1	0	0	0	1

=== Yellow cards ===
No.	Flag	Pos	Name	League One	FA Cup	League Cup	Football League Trophy	Total
7	(Scotland)	MF	John Fleck	9	0	1	1	11
6	(England)	MF	Conor Thomas	9	0	0	0	9
20	(England)	FW	Callum Wilson	6	0	0	1	7
2	(England)	DF	Cyrus Christie	5	2	0	0	7
14	(Belgium)	MF	Franck Moussa	5	1	0	0	6
8	(England)	MF	Carl Baker	6	0	0	0	6
3	(England)	DF	Blair Adams	5	0	0	0	5
4	(Scotland)	DF	Andy Webster	5	0	0	0	5
24	(England)	DF	Jordan Clarke	4	0	0	0	4
9	(England)	FW	Leon Clarke	1	1	1	0	3
18	(England)	DF	Aaron Phillips	2	0	0	0	2
13	(Scotland)	MF	Chris Maguire	2	0	0	0	2
26	(Jamaica)	MF	Mark Marshall	2	0	0	0	2
10	(France)	FW	Mathieu Manset	1	0	0	0	1
19	(England)	DF	Jordan Willis	1	0	0	0	1
17	(England)	MF	Billy Daniels	0	1	0	0	1
15	(England)	DF	Danny Seaborne	0	1	0	0	1
21	(England)	FW	Chris Dagnall	1	0	0	0	1
1	(Republic of Ireland)	GK	Joe Murphy	1	0	0	0	1
16	(Republic of Ireland)	MF	Adam Barton	1	0	0	0	1
10	(England)	FW	Nathan Delfouneso	1	0	0	0	1
9	(England)	FW	Chuba Akpom	1	0	0	0	1
12	(England)	MF	David Prutton	1	0	0	0	1
27	(England)	MF	Anton Robinson	1	0	0	0	1

=== Red cards ===
No.	Flag	Pos	Name	League One	FA Cup	League Cup	Football League Trophy	Total
8	(England)	MF	Carl Baker	0	0	1	0	1
15	(England)	DF	Danny Seaborne	1	0	0	0	1

=== Captains ===
No.	Pos.	Name	Starts
8	MF	(England) Carl Baker	37
15	DF	(England) Danny Seaborne	6
9	FW	(England) Leon Clarke	6
1	GK	(Republic of Ireland) Joe Murphy	3

=== Penalties awarded ===
Date	Success?	Penalty Taker	Opponent	Competition
6 August 2013	✗	(England) Leon Clarke	Leyton Orient	League Cup
11 August 2013	✓	(England) Leon Clarke	Bristol City	League One
23 November 2013	✓	(England) Carl Baker	Tranmere Rovers	League One
14 December 2013	✓	(England) Callum Wilson	Crewe Alexandra	League One
1 January 2014	✓	(England) Carl Baker	Peterborough United	League One
11 March 2014	✓	(England) Callum Wilson	Gillingham	League One
11 March 2014	✓	(England) Carl Baker	Gillingham	League One
26 March 2014	✗	(England) Callum Wilson	Stevenage	League One
5 April 2014	✗	(England) Carl Baker	Milton Keynes Dons	League One

=== Suspensions served ===
Date	Matches Missed	Suspended Player	Reason	Missed Opponents
6 August 2013	3	(England) Carl Baker	(red card) vs. Leyton Orient	Bristol City (H), Carlisle United (A), Preston North End (H)
16 November 2013	1	(Scotland) John Fleck	Reached 5 yellow cards	AFC Wimbledon (A)
23 November 2013	1	(England) Conor Thomas	Reached 5 yellow cards	Tranmere Rovers (H)
7 December 2013	1	(England) Callum Wilson	Reached 5 yellow cards	Hartlepool United (A)
1 January 2014	3	(England) Danny Seaborne	(red card) vs. Oldham Athletic (FA Disciplinary Panel)	Rotherham United (A), Barnsley (A), Crawley Town (H)
16 March 2014	1	(England) Danny Seaborne	(red card) vs. Gillingham	Port Vale (H)
26 March 2014	2	(Scotland) John Fleck	Reached 10 yellow cards	Crewe Alexandra (A), Bradford City (H)

=== Monthly & weekly awards ===
Award	Date	Player
LMA Performance of the Week	15 August 2013	Team vs. Bristol City
London Supporters Club Player of the Month	3 September 2013	(England) Cyrus Christie
August Player of the Month	18 September 2013	(England) Callum Wilson
September Player of the Month	24 October 2013	(England) Callum Wilson
October PFA Fan's Player of the Month	1 November 2013	(England) Callum Wilson
October League One Manager of the Month	8 November 2013	(Scotland) Steven Pressley
November Player of the Month	11 December 2013	(Scotland) John Fleck
December Player of the Month	–	
January Player of the Month	20 February 2014	(Belgium) Franck Moussa

=== Goal of the month awards ===
Month	Date	Player	Opponent
August	12 September 2013	(England) Callum Wilson	Preston North End
September	16 October 2013	(Belgium) Franck Moussa	Port Vale
October	12 November 2013	(Belgium) Franck Moussa	Leyton Orient
November	11 December 2013	(Scotland) Chris Maguire	Milton Keynes Dons
December	14 January 2014	(England) Carl Baker	Oldham Athletic
January	20 February 2014	(Belgium) Franck Moussa	Preston North End

=== End-of-season awards ===
Award	Winner
Top Goalscorer	(England) Callum Wilson
Players' Player of the Season	(England) Callum Wilson
Goal of the Season	(Belgium) Franck Moussa
Player of the Season	(England) Callum Wilson
Young Player of the Season	(England) Conor Thomas
Trainer of the Season	(Scotland) John Fleck
Community Player of the Season	(England) Conor Thomas

=== International appearances ===
Date	No.	Pos.	Name	Match	Stats	Caps
20 August 2013	N/A	DF	(Wales) Cian Harries	Wales U-17 4 – 0 Malta U-17	90 Minutes	4
20 August 2013	N/A	FW	(Wales) George Thomas	Wales U-17 4 – 0 Malta U-17	90 Minutes	3
23 September 2013	3	DF	(Wales) Cian Harries	Hungary U-17 5 – 5 Wales U-17	90 Minutes	5
23 September 2013	8	FW	(Wales) George Thomas	Hungary U-17 5 – 5 Wales U-17	90 Minutes	4
25 September 2013	3	DF	(Wales) Cian Harries	Scotland U-17 0 – 0 Wales U-17	90 Minutes	6
25 September 2013	8	FW	(Wales) George Thomas	Scotland U-17 0 – 0 Wales U-17	90 Minutes	5
28 September 2013	3	DF	(Wales) Cian Harries	Wales U-17 3 – 0 Slovenia U-17	90 Minutes	7
28 September 2013	8	FW	(Wales) George Thomas	Wales U-17 3 – 0 Slovenia U-17	90 Minutes	6
18 February 2014	3	DF	(Wales) Cian Harries	Czech Republic U-17 1 – 3 Wales U-17	90 Minutes	8
18 February 2014	8	FW	(Wales) George Thomas	Czech Republic U-17 1 – 3 Wales U-17	90 Minutes	7
20 February 2014	3	DF	(Wales) Cian Harries	Czech Republic U-17 2 – 2 Wales U-17	90 Minutes	9
20 February 2014	18	FW	(Wales) George Thomas	Czech Republic U-17 2 – 2 Wales U-17	45 Minutes	8
26 March 2014	3	DF	(Wales) Cian Harries	Switzerland U-17 1 – 0 Wales U-17	90 Minutes	10
26 March 2014	8	FW	(Wales) George Thomas	Switzerland U-17 1 – 0 Wales U-17	90 Minutes	9
28 March 2014	3	DF	(Wales) Cian Harries	Spain U-17 1 – 0 Wales U-17	90 Minutes	11
28 March 2014	8	FW	(Wales) George Thomas	Spain U-17 1 – 0 Wales U-17	90 Minutes	10
31 March 2014	8	FW	(Wales) George Thomas	Wales U-17 0 – 2 Russia U-17	58 Minutes	11

=== Overall ===
Games played	52 (45 League One, 5 FA Cup, 1 League Cup, 1 Football League Trophy)
Games won	19 (16 League One, 3 FA Cup, 0 League Cup, 0 Football League Trophy)
Games drawn	14 (13 League One, 1 FA Cup, 0 League Cup, 0 Football League Trophy)
Games lost	19 (16 League One, 1 FA Cup, 1 League Cup, 1 Football League Trophy)
Goals scored	83 (73 League One, 8 FA Cup, 2 League Cup, 0 Football League Trophy)
Goals conceded	86 (75 League One, 8 FA Cup, 3 League Cup, 0 Football League Trophy)
Goal difference	−3
Yellow cards	80 (70 League One, 6 FA Cup, 2 League Cup, 2 Football League Trophy)
Red cards	2 (1 League One, 0 FA Cup, 1 League Cup, 0 Football League Trophy)
Worst discipline	(England) Carl Baker (6 (yellow card) , 1 (red card) )
Best result	W 4–0 (A) v Carlisle United – Football League One – 17 August 2013
Worst result	L 1–5 (H) v Tranmere Rovers – Football League One – 23 November 2013
Most appearances	(Republic of Ireland) Joe Murphy (52)
Top scorer	Callum Wilson (22)
Points	50 / 135 (37.03%) †

- † Club were deducted 10 points before season start.

== Transfers ==
=== Transfers in ===
Player	From	Date	Fee
(France) Mathieu Manset	(England) Carlisle United	7 August 2013	Free
(Scotland) Andy Webster	(Scotland) Heart of Midlothian	9 August 2013	Free
(Scotland) Stuart Urquhart	(Scotland) Rangers	18 September 2013	Free
(Curaçao) Denzel Slager	(Netherlands) RKC Waalwijk	4 January 2014	Free
(England) Danny Seaborne	(England) Yeovil Town	14 January 2014	Free
(Jamaica) Mark Marshall	Free Agent	3 February 2014	Free

=== Transfers out ===
Player	To	Date	Fee
(Republic of Ireland) Stephen Elliott	(England) Carlisle United	29 April 2013	Free
(Wales) Will Roberts	Released	15 May 2013	Free
(England) Nathan Cameron	(England) Bury	28 June 2013	Free
(Republic of Ireland) Shane Fagan	(Republic of Ireland) Shamrock Rovers	1 July 2013	Free
(England) Jordan Stewart	(United States) San Jose Earthquakes	9 July 2013	Free
(England) Cody McDonald	(England) Gillingham	10 July 2013	Free
(England) David Bell	(England) Notts County	19 July 2013	Free
(England) Richard Wood	(England) Charlton Athletic	19 July 2013	Free
(England) Ricky Fletcher	(England) Coventry Sphinx	26 July 2013	Free
(England) Josh Ruffels	(England) Oxford United	30 July 2013	Free
(England) Joe Henderson	(England) Daventry Town	16 August 2013	Free
(England) Danny Philliskirk	(England) Oldham Athletic	16 August 2013	Free
(England) Chris Dunn	(England) Yeovil Town	17 August 2013	Free
(France) William Edjenguélé	(England) Bury	22 August 2013	Free
(France) Kévin Malaga	Released	2 September 2013	Free
(England) Gary McSheffrey	(England) Chesterfield	13 September 2013	Free
(England) Shaun Jeffers	(England) Peterborough United	16 October 2013	Free
(England) Steve Jennings	(England) Tranmere Rovers	22 October 2013	Free
(France) Mathieu Manset	(Belgium) Royal Antwerp	6 January 2014	Free
(England) Leon Lobjoit	(England) Hemel Hempstead Town	29 January 2014	Free
(England) Leon Clarke	(England) Wolverhampton Wanderers	30 January 2014	£750,000
(Curaçao) Denzel Slager	(United States) Orange County Blues	18 February 2014	Free

=== Loans in ===
Player	From	Date from	Date to
(Jamaica) Jamar Loza	(England) Norwich City	25 October 2013	22 November 2013
(England) Chris Dagnall	(England) Barnsley	28 November 2013	5 January 2014
(Scotland) Chris Maguire	(England) Sheffield Wednesday	28 November 2013	23 December 2013
(England) Danny Seaborne	(England) Yeovil Town	28 November 2013	5 January 2014
(England) Nathan Delfouneso	(England) Aston Villa	30 January 2014	31 May 2014
(Scotland) Dylan McGeouch	(Scotland) Celtic	30 January 2014	31 May 2014
(Northern Ireland) Rory Donnelly	(Wales) Swansea City	31 January 2014	4 February 2014
(Canada) Michael Petrasso	(England) Queens Park Rangers	14 February 2014	16 March 2014
(England) Chuba Akpom	(England) Arsenal	14 February 2014	24 March 2014
(England) Anton Robinson	(England) Huddersfield Town	24 March 2014	31 May 2014
(England) Nathan Eccleston	(England) Blackpool	26 March 2014	31 May 2014
(England) David Prutton	(England) Sheffield Wednesday	27 March 2014	31 May 2014

=== Loans out ===
Player	To	Date from	Date to
(England) Courtney Baker-Richardson	(England) Tamworth	20 February 2014	26 April 2014
(Republic of Ireland) Adam Barton	(England) Fleetwood Town	27 March 2014	31 May 2014
(England) Billy Daniels	(England) Cheltenham Town	27 March 2014	17 April 2014

=== Trials ===
Player	Pos.	From	Trial date	Signed
(France) Mathieu Manset	FW	(England) Carlisle United	17 July 2013	✓
(Spain) Israel	MF	(Spain) Xerez	17 July 2013	✗
(Portugal) Fábio Martins	MF	(Portugal) Porto B	22 July 2013	✗
(Scotland) Craig Reid	DF	(Scotland) Greenock Morton	24 July 2013	✗
(Spain) Daniel Orozco	DF	(Hungary) Lombard-Pápa	26 July 2013	✗
(England) Zavon Hines	MF	(England) Bradford City	27 July 2013	✗
(Brazil) Alessandro Celin	FW	South China	22 August 2013	✗
(Portugal) Fábio Nunes	MF	(England) Blackburn Rovers	22 August 2013	✗
(Scotland) Robbie Neilson	DF	(Scotland) Falkirk	22 August 2013	✗
(Scotland) Stuart Urquhart	DF	(Scotland) Rangers	2 September 2013	✓
(England) Jake Jervis	FW	(Turkey) Elazığspor	4 October 2013	✗
(Curaçao) Denzel Slager	FW	(Netherlands) RKC Waalwijk	9 December 2013	✓
(Jamaica) Mark Marshall	MF	Free Agent	30 January 2014	✓
