= 2011–12 Coventry City F.C. season =

Coventry City F.C.
2011–12 season
- Chairman: Ken Dulieu (until 2 December 2011); Vacant (since 2 December 2011)
- Manager: Andy Thorn
- Stadium: Ricoh Arena
- Championship: 23rd (relegated)
- FA Cup: 3rd round vs Southampton
- League Cup: 1st round vs Bury
- Top goalscorer: League: Lukas Jutkiewicz 9 All: Lukas Jutkiewicz, Gary McSheffrey 9
- Highest home attendance: 22,240 vs Birmingham City – Championship – 10 March 2012
- Lowest home attendance: 12,054 vs Crystal Palace – Championship – 6 March 2012
- Average home league attendance: 15,118
Home colours	Away colours

The 2011–12 season was Coventry City's 92nd season in The Football League and their 11th consecutive season in the Football League Championship, giving them the longest consecutive run out of all the teams in the division. In addition to the Championship, The Sky Blues also entered the League Cup in the first round and will enter the FA Cup in the third round.

== Review and events ==
=== Monthly events ===
This is a list of the significant events to occur at the club during the 2011–12 season, presented in chronological order. This list does not include transfers, which are listed in the transfers section below, or match results, which are in the results section.

June:

- 16 – Coventry City draw Bury away in the League Cup First Round.
- 17 – Coventry City's fixtures for the 2011–12 Championship season are announced
- 19 – Defender Jordan Clarke signs a new three-year contract extension running until June 2014.
- 19 – Strikers Callum Wilson and Shaun Jeffers sign new two-year contract extensions running until June 2013.
- 21 – Sammy Clingan is named new club captain for the 2011–12 season, taking over from Lee Carsley.
- 27 – Goalkeeper Danny Ireland signs a new one-year contract extension running until June 2012.
- 27 – Defender Nathan Cameron signs a new two-year contract extension running until June 2013.

July:

- 20 – Coventry City announce the new squad numbers for the forthcoming season.
- 22 – Coventry City appoint former captain Lee Carsley as Under-18s coach.

August

- 4 – Defender James McPake signs a new one-year contract extension running until June 2013.
- 4 – Midfielder David Bell signs a new three-year contract extension running until June 2015.
- 8 – Midfielder Gaël Bigirimana signs a new one-year contract extension running until June 2014.
- 22 – Cyrus Christie is named in the Official Football League Championship team of the week, following his performance against Watford.
- 23- An official takeover bid is made for Coventry City by a consortium fronted by former Vice-Chairman Gary Hoffman.
- 27- The official takeover bid fronted by former Vice-Chairman Gary Hoffman is withdrawn due to possible rule breach.

September

- 2 – Goalkeeper Lee Burge signs a new two-year contract extension running until June 2014.
- 12 – Cyrus Christie is named in the Official Football League Championship team of the week, following his performance against Derby County.

October

- 18 – Joe Murphy and Chris Hussey are named in the Official Football League Championship team of the week, following their performances against Nottingham Forest.
- 18 – Midfielder Carl Baker signs a new three-year contract extension running until June 2015.

November

- 8 – Midfielder Gary McSheffrey signs a one-year contract extension running until June 2013.
- 15 – Director Leonard Brody stands down from his position with immediate effect.
- 26 – Coventry City set up a link with Norwegian club IF Helle.

December

- 2 – Ken Dulieu stands down as Coventry City Chairman and take up Head Of Football Operations role.
- 4 – Coventry City draw Southampton away in the FA Cup Third Round.
- 20 – Former Coventry City chairman Ken Dulieu resigns as Head of Football Operations.

February

- 13 – Jordan Willis is called up to the England Under-18 squad for the first time for the match against Poland Under-19.
- 15 – Coventry City played Kettering Town in a fundraising friendly match to raise money for the Blue Square Bet Premier club. The match raised over £6,000l.
- 27 – Richard Keogh is named in the Official Football League Championship team of the week, following his performance against Barnsley.

March

- 2 – Coventry City have a transfer embargo placed on them for not filing their annual accounts.
- 7 – Jordan Willis wins first cap for England Under-18 in friendly against Poland Under-19.
- 11 – Gaël Bigirimana wins Championship Apprentice Of The Year Award for 2011/2012.
- 19 – Joe Murphy is named in the Official Football League Championship team of the week, following his performance against Watford.
- 26 – Chris Hussey is named in the Official Football League Championship team of the week, following his performance against Portsmouth.

April

- 2 – Richard Keogh is named in the Official Football League Championship team of the week, following his performance against Hull City.
- 16 – Richard Keogh wins Irish Supporters' Club Player of the Season Award for 2011/2012.
- 17 – Richard Keogh wins South Wales Supporters' Club's Player of the Season Award for 2011/2012.
- 18 – Richard Keogh wins London Supporters' Club Player of the Season Award for 2011/2012.
- 21 – Coventry City are relegated from the Football League Championship and will play in the Football League One next season.
- 21 – Richard Keogh wins Coventry City Supporters' Club Player of the Season Award for 2011/2012.
- 21 – Gaël Bigirimana wins Community Player of the Season Award for 2011/2012.
- 21 – Cyrus Christie wins Young Player of the Season Award for 2011/2012.
- 21 – Jordan Clarke wins Goal of the Season Award for 2011/2012 for his strike against Cardiff City.
- 21 – Gary McSheffrey wins Top Scorer Award for 2011/2012.
- 21 – Richard Keogh wins Players' Player of the Season Award for 2011/2012.
- 21 – Richard Keogh wins Fans' Player of the Season Award for 2011/2012.
- 26 – Academy player Joe Henderson was handed a first team squad number, He has been given the number 39 shirt.

== Squad details ==
=== Players info ===
As of 30 April 2012

No.	Name	Nat.	Place of birth	Date of birth	Club apps.	Club goals	Int. caps	Int. goals	Previous club	Date joined	Contract end	Fee
1	Joe Murphy	(Republic of Ireland)	Dublin	21 August 1981	46	0	2	0	Scunthorpe United	1 July 2011	30 June 2014	Free
2	Richard Keogh	(Republic of Ireland)	(England) Harlow	11 August 1986	91	1	–	–	Carlisle United	1 July 2010	30 June 2013	Undisclosed
3	Chris Hussey	(England)	Hammersmith	2 January 1989	48	0	–	–	AFC Wimbledon	1 January 2010	30 June 2013	Undisclosed
4	Sammy Clingan	(Northern Ireland)	Belfast	13 January 1984	98	7	28	0	Norwich City	24 July 2009	30 June 2012	£700,000
5	Hermann Hreiðarsson	(Iceland)	Reykjavík	11 July 1974	2	0	89	5	Portsmouth	16 January 2012	30 June 2012	Free
6	James McPake	(Scotland)	Bellshill	24 June 1984	38	1	–	–	Livingston	2 February 2009	30 June 2013	Undisclosed
7	David Bell	(Republic of Ireland)	(England) Kettering	21 January 1984	87	5	–	–	Norwich City	30 January 2009	30 June 2015	£500,000
8	Carl Baker	(England)	Whiston	26 December 1982	78	2	–	–	Stockport County	8 January 2010	30 June 2015	Undisclosed
10	Freddy Eastwood	(Wales)	(England) Basildon	29 October 1983	113	17	11	4	Wolverhampton Wanderers	11 July 2008	30 June 2012	£1,200,000
11	Gary McSheffrey	(England)	Coventry	13 August 1982	213	60	–	–	Birmingham City	1 July 2010	30 June 2013	Free
12	Gary Deegan	(Republic of Ireland)	Dublin	28 September 1987	42	5	–	–	Bohemians	4 January 2010	30 June 2013	€90,000
13	Chris Dunn	(England)	Brentwood	23 October 1987	2	0	–	–	Northampton Town	1 July 2011	30 June 2014	Undisclosed
14	Cody McDonald	(England)	Chelmsford	30 May 1986	21	4	–	–	Norwich City	31 August 2011	30 June 2014	£500,000
15	Martin Cranie	(England)	Yeovil	23 September 1986	112	1	–	–	Portsmouth	13 August 2009	30 June 2012	£500,000
16	Oliver Norwood	(Northern Ireland)	(England) Burnley	12 April 1991	16	2	4	0	Manchester United	31 January 2012	30 June 2012	Loan
18	Alex Nimely	(England)	(Liberia) Monrovia	11 May 1991	17	1	–	–	Manchester City	12 January 2012	30 June 2012	Loan
19	Roy O'Donovan	(Republic of Ireland)	Cork	10 August 1985	13	0	–	–	Sunderland	1 July 2010	30 June 2013	Free
22	Clive Platt	(England)	Wolverhampton	27 October 1977	66	6	–	–	Colchester United	28 July 2010	30 June 2012	Nominal
23	Danny Ireland	(Australia)	Sydney	30 September 1990	1	0	–	–	N/A	1 July 2007	30 June 2012	Trainee
24	Richard Wood	(England)	Ossett	5 July 1985	81	5	–	–	Sheffield Wednesday	1 January 2010	30 June 2013	Undisclosed
26	Jordan Clarke	(England)	Coventry	19 November 1991	50	2	–	–	N/A	1 June 2008	30 June 2014	Trainee
27	Shaun Jeffers	(England)	Bedford	14 April 1992	5	0	–	–	N/A	1 June 2009	30 June 2013	Trainee
28	Callum Wilson	(England)	Coventry	27 February 1992	1	0	–	–	N/A	1 June 2009	30 June 2013	Trainee
29	Billy Daniels	(England)	Bristol	3 July 1994	0	0	–	–	N/A	16 April 2012	N/A	Trainee
30	Nathan Cameron	(England)	Birmingham	21 November 1991	39	0	–	–	N/A	1 June 2009	30 June 2013	Trainee
31	Cyrus Christie	(England)	Coventry	30 September 1992	37	0	–	–	N/A	1 June 2010	30 June 2012	Trainee
32	Conor Thomas	(England)	Coventry	29 October 1993	25	1	–	–	N/A	1 June 2010	30 June 2014	Trainee
33	Lee Burge	(England)	Hereford	9 January 1993	–	–	–	–	N/A	1 June 2010	30 June 2014	Trainee
34	Gaël Bigirimana	(Democratic Republic of the Congo)	(Burundi) Bujumbura	22 October 1993	24	0	–	–	N/A	1 June 2010	30 June 2014	Trainee
35	Josh Ruffels	(England)	Oxford	23 October 1993	1	0	–	–	N/A	1 June 2010	30 June 2012	Trainee
36	Aaron Phillips	(England)	Warwick	20 November 1993	–	–	–	–	N/A	1 June 2011	30 June 2012	Trainee
37	Jordan Willis	(England)	Coventry	24 August 1994	2	0	–	–	N/A	1 June 2011	30 June 2012	Trainee
38	Will Roberts	(Wales)	Rhuddlan	24 April 1994	–	–	–	–	N/A	1 June 2011	30 June 2013	Trainee
39	Joe Henderson	(England)	Banbury	2 November 1993	–	–	–	–	N/A	1 June 2011	30 June 2013	Trainee
Players played for Coventry this season who have left before the season ends:
9	Lukas Jutkiewicz	(England)	Southampton	28 March 1989	67	18	–	–	Everton	26 July 2010	23 January 2012	£100,000
25	Gary Gardner	(England)	Solihull	29 June 1992	4	1	–	–	Aston Villa	24 November 2011	21 December 2011	Loan

== Matches ==
=== Pre-season friendlies ===
16 July 2011	Nuneaton Town	2–2	Coventry City	Nuneaton
15:00 GMT	Smith 29'; Glover 90'	Report	O'Donovan 66', 88'	Stadium: Liberty Way; Attendance: 1,440; Referee: Eddie Smart

20 July 2011	Hinckley United	0–3	Coventry City	Hinckley
19:00 GMT		Report	O'Donovan 2'; Eastwood 61'; Thomas 73'	Stadium: The Greene King Stadium; Attendance: 1,112; Referee: Ian Dudley

23 July 2011	Kettering Town	0–1	Coventry City	Kettering
15:00 GMT		Report	McSheffrey 49'	Stadium: Rockingham Road; Attendance: 969

26 July 2011	Chesterfield	2–2	Coventry City	Chesterfield
19:45 GMT	Morgan 51', 60'	Report	Hussey 40'; Jutkiewicz 52'	Stadium: B2net Stadium; Attendance: 2,572

27 July 2011	Leamington	1–2	Coventry City XI	Leamington
19:45 GMT	Berwick 37' (pen.)	Report	Wilson 22'; Ruffels 28'	Stadium: New Windmill Ground; Attendance: 724

30 July 2011	Coventry City	0–3	Norwich City	Coventry
15:00 GMT		Report	Wilbraham 2'; Morison 67'; Bennett 87'	Stadium: Ricoh Arena; Referee: Phil Gibbs

2 August 2011	Coventry Sphinx	3–4	Coventry City XI	Coventry
19:00 GMT	Donaldson 15'; Tomczak 40'; Edwards 58'	Report	Richards 54'; Daniels 68'; Phillips 87'; Jeffers 88'	Stadium: Sphinx Drive; Attendance: 148; Referee: Ken Andrews

16 February 2012	Kettering Town	1–1	Coventry City XI	Kettering
15:00 GMT	Verma 12'	Report	Clarke-Harris 75'	Stadium: Rockingham Road; Attendance: 525; Referee: Dave Avent

=== Championship ===
6 August 2011 1	Coventry City	0–1	Leicester City	Coventry
12:30	Baker (red card) 39'; Hussey (yellow card) 65'; O'Donovan (yellow card) 90+3'	(Report)	Peltier 52'; Vassell (red card) 11'; Wellens (yellow card) 80'; Gallagher (yellow card) 82'; Fernandes (yellow card) 90+2'; Mills (yellow card) 90+3'	Stadium: Ricoh Arena; Attendance: 21,102 (6,264 away); Referee: Darren Deadman

13 August 2011 2	Birmingham City	1–0	Coventry City	Birmingham
15:00	Fahey 73'	report	Bell (yellow card) 90+1'	Stadium: St Andrew's; Attendance: 19,225 (1,670 away); Referee: Anthony Bates

16 August 2011 3	Crystal Palace	2–1	Coventry City	London
20:00	Scannell 90', (yellow card) 89'; Easter 90+6'; Jedinak (yellow card) 79'	report	Jutkiewicz 48'; Bigirimana (yellow card) 45'; Murphy (yellow card) 90+1'	Stadium: Selhurst Park; Attendance: 12,330 (460 away); Referee: Patrick Miller

20 August 2011 4	Coventry City	0–0	Watford	Coventry
17:00		report	Dickinson (yellow card) 56'; Jenkins (yellow card) 88'	Stadium: Ricoh Arena; Attendance: 13,043 (849 away); Referee: Roger East

27 August 2011 5	Middlesbrough	1–1	Coventry City	Middlesbrough
15:00	Emnes 21'	report	Jutkiewicz 76'; Baker (yellow card) 36'	Stadium: Riverside Stadium; Attendance: 17,432 (295 away); Referee: Paul Tierney

10 September 2011 6	Coventry City	2–0	Derby County	Coventry
15:00	Jutkiewicz 59' (pen.); Baker 79'	report		Stadium: Ricoh Arena; Attendance: 14,219 (1,427 away); Referee: Chris Foy

19 September 2011 7	Ipswich Town	3–0	Coventry City	Ipswich
19:45	Cranie 7' (o.g.); Andrews 15'; Scotland 67'	report	Bell (yellow card) 29'	Stadium: Portman Road; Attendance: 15,650 (185 away); Referee: Craig Pawson

24 September 2011 8	Coventry City	1–1	Reading	Coventry
15:00	McSheffrey 2'; Christie (yellow card) 20'; Thomas (yellow card) 90+2'	report	Church 10'; Cummings (yellow card) 65'; Gorkšs (yellow card) 90+3'	Stadium: Ricoh Arena; Attendance: 12,309 (815 away); Referee: Eddie Ilderton

27 September 2011 9	Coventry City	2–2	Blackpool	Coventry
19:45	Deegan 78'; Jutkiewicz 83'	report	Taylor-Fletcher 18'; Southern 90+2'; Eardley (yellow card) 68'	Stadium: Ricoh Arena; Attendance: 12,822 (1,043 away); Referee: Andy Woolmer

1 October 2011 10	Barnsley	2–0	Coventry City	Barnsley
15:00	Gray 42' (pen.), 55'; O'Brien (yellow card) 60'	report	Hussey (yellow card) 41'	Stadium: Oakwell; Attendance: 9,497 (784 away); Referee: Geoff Eltringham

15 October 2011 11	Coventry City	1–0	Nottingham Forest	Coventry
15:00	Jutkiewicz 57'	report	Miller (yellow card) 65'	Stadium: Ricoh Arena; Attendance: 15,712 (2,191 away); Referee: Fred Graham

18 October 2011 12	Leeds United	1–1	Coventry City	Leeds
19:45	O'Dea 26'; Snodgrass (yellow card) 62'	report	Wood 90+3', (yellow card) 54'	Stadium: Elland Road; Attendance: 21,528; Referee: Andy Haines

22 October 2011 13	Coventry City	1–2	Burnley	Coventry
15:00	McDonald 59'; Bell (yellow card) 58'; Bigirimana (red card) 81'; Murphy (yellow card) 90+'; Wood (yellow card) 90+'	report	Wallace 73', (yellow card) 67'; Austin 90+4'; Rodriguez (yellow card) 32'; Bartley (yellow card) 53'; Edgar (yellow card) 79'; Hines (yellow card) 90+6'	Stadium: Ricoh Arena; Attendance: 12,785 (987 away); Referee: Graham Scott

29 October 2011 14	Doncaster Rovers	1–1	Coventry City	Doncaster
15:00	Hayter 60'; Stock (yellow card) 82'	report	Clingan 31'; Cameron (yellow card) 84'	Stadium: Keepmoat Stadium; Attendance: 8,426; Referee: Colin Webster

1 November 2011 15	Millwall	3–0	Coventry City	London
19:45	Henderson 53', 69'; Feeney 82'	report		Stadium: The Den; Attendance: 9,517 (386 away); Referee: David Phillips

5 November 2011 16	Coventry City	2–4	Southampton	Coventry
15:00	Jutkiewicz 47'; Platt 70'; Christie (yellow card) 66'	report	Chaplow 34'; Lallana 39' do Prado 77'; De Ridder 85'	Stadium: Ricoh Arena; Attendance: 15,621 (3,008 away); Referee: Michael Naylor

19 November 2011 17	Coventry City	1–2	West Ham United	Coventry
15:00	Platt 33'; McSheffrey (yellow card) 41'; Clingan (yellow card) 70'	report	Cole 69'; Piquionne 75'; Diop (yellow card) 20'; Faye (yellow card) 49'; Faubert (yellow card) 59'	Stadium: Ricoh Arena; Attendance: 20,524 (6,500 away); Referee: Keith Stroud

22 November 2011 18	Coventry City	1–1	Cardiff City	Coventry
19:45	Jutkiewicz 61'; Bigirimana (yellow card) 62'	report	Whittingham 48'	Stadium: Ricoh Arena; Attendance: 12,317 (1,130 away); Referee: Darren Drysdale

26 November 2011 19	Brighton & Hove Albion	2–1	Coventry City	Brighton
15:00	Mackail-Smith 7'; Vincelot 37'	report	Gardner 9'; Baker (yellow card) 18'; Hussey (yellow card) 45'; Cranie (yellow card) 90+3'	Stadium: Amex Stadium; Attendance: 19,108 (1,781 away); Referee: Gavin Ward

3 December 2011 20	Portsmouth	2–1	Coventry City	Portsmouth
15:00	Halford 20' (pen.); Ward 59'	report	Jutkiewicz 54'; Wood (yellow card) 73'	Stadium: Fratton Park; Attendance: 12,236; Referee: Carl Boyeson

10 December 2011 21	Coventry City	0–1	Hull City	Coventry
15:00	Gardner (yellow card) 33'	report	Evans 60'	Stadium: Ricoh Arena; Attendance: 12,652 (884 away); Referee: Paul Tierney

17 December 2011 22	Peterborough United	1–0	Coventry City	Peterborough
15:00	Sinclair 66'	report	Keogh (yellow card) 68'; Wood (yellow card) 75'	Stadium: London Road Stadium; Attendance: 8,062 (918 away); Referee: Mark Brown

26 December 2011 23	Coventry City	1–0	Bristol City	Coventry
15:00	Deegan 72' (yellow card) 48'	report	Cissé (yellow card) 78'	Stadium: Ricoh Arena; Attendance: 15,302 (1,620 away); Referee: Phil Gibbs

31 December 2011 24	Coventry City	2–0	Brighton & Hove Albion	Coventry
15:00	McSheffrey 34'; Jutkiewicz 54'; Deegan (yellow card) 40'; Christie (yellow card) 69'	report	Navarro (yellow card) 27'; Dunk (yellow card) 57'	Stadium: Ricoh Arena; Attendance: 14,158 (1,306 away); Referee: Mark Haywood

2 January 2012 25	West Ham United	1–0	Coventry City	London
15:00	Nolan 66'	report	Deegan (yellow card) 71'	Stadium: Upton Park; Attendance: 34,936; Referee: Simon Hooper

14 January 2012 26	Derby County	1–0	Coventry City	Derby
15:00	Ball 75'	report	Deegan (yellow card) 38'; Keogh (yellow card) 86'	Stadium: Pride Park Stadium; Attendance: 24,126 (965 away); Referee: Roger East

21 January 2012 27	Coventry City	3–1	Middlesbrough	Coventry
15:00	McSheffrey 36'; Nimely 57'; Bates 64' (o.g.); Deegan (yellow card) 43'; Hreiðarsson (yellow card) 74'	report	McDonald 66'; Thomson (yellow card) 29' (red card) 39'; Williams (yellow card) 56'; Robson (yellow card) 59'; Arca (red card) 90'	Stadium: Ricoh Arena; Attendance: 14,112 (1,541 away); Referee: Gary Sutton

31 January 2012 28	Blackpool	2–1	Coventry City	Blackpool
20:00	K. Phillips 87'; Taylor-Fletcher 90', (yellow card) 88'; Evatt (yellow card) 88'	report	Thomas 43'; Christie (yellow card) 69'; Murphy (yellow card) 88'	Stadium: Bloomfield Road; Attendance: 11,414; Referee: Dean Mohareb

4 February 2012 29	Coventry City	2–3	Ipswich Town	Coventry
15:00	Clingan 29' (pen.); Deegan 45'; Wood (yellow card) 66'	report	Emmanuel-Thomas 22'; Chopra 64', 90+5'	Stadium: Ricoh Arena; Attendance: 13,464 (1,146 away); Referee: Nigel Miller

11 February 2012 30	Reading	2–0	Coventry City	Reading
15:00	Kébé 25'; Roberts 43'; Leigertwood (yellow card) 65'	report	Christie (yellow card) 28'; Cranie (yellow card) 40'; Clarke (yellow card) 82'	Stadium: Madejski Stadium; Attendance: 18,006 (1,303 away); Referee: David Coote

14 February 2012 31	Coventry City	2–1	Leeds United	Coventry
19:45	McSheffrey 20' (pen.), 90+3' (pen.), (yellow card) 90+4'; Nimely (yellow card) 83'	report	McCormack 32'; Pugh (yellow card) 20'; Brown (yellow card) 74'; White (yellow card) 90'	Stadium: Ricoh Arena; Attendance: 15,704 (3,214 away); Referee: Pat Miller

18 February 2012 32	Nottingham Forest	2–0	Coventry City	Nottingham
15:00	McCleary 74'; Findley 86'	report		Stadium: City Ground; Attendance: 21,588 (2,663 away); Referee: Mark Clattenburg

25 February 2012 33	Coventry City	1–0	Barnsley	Coventry
15:00	Platt 90+1'; McSheffrey (yellow card) 90+3'	report		Stadium: Ricoh Arena; Attendance: 13,928 (922 away); Referee: Andy D'Urso

3 March 2012 34	Leicester City	2–0	Coventry City	Leicester
15:00	Nugent 11'; Beckford 60'; Morgan (yellow card) 46'; Konchesky (red card) 83'	report	Nimely (yellow card) 34'	Stadium: King Power Stadium; Attendance: 25,487 (1,894 away); Referee: Lee Probert

6 March 2012 35	Coventry City	1–1	Crystal Palace	Coventry
19:45	McDonald 80'; Clarke (yellow card) 36'; Cameron (yellow card) 69'; McSheffrey (yellow card) 73'	report	Ambrose 4' (pen.); McShane (yellow card) 68'	Stadium: Ricoh Arena; Attendance: 12,054 (624 away); Referee: Mark Brown

10 March 2012 36	Coventry City	1–1	Birmingham City	Coventry
12:30	McSheffrey 70'; Nimely (yellow card) 57'; Clarke (yellow card) 89'	report	King 72'; Mutch (red card) 90'	Stadium: Ricoh Arena; Attendance: 22,240 (5,755 away); Referee: Neil Swarbrick

17 March 2012 37	Watford	0–0	Coventry City	Watford
15:00	Nosworthy (yellow card) 66'; Murray (yellow card) 76'; Deeney (yellow card) 90+4'	report		Stadium: Vicarage Road; Attendance: 12,563 (1,067 away); Referee: Colin Webster

21 March 2012 38	Cardiff City	2–2	Coventry City	Cardiff
19:45	McDonald 18' (o.g.); Whittingham 83'; Gunnarsson (yellow card) 51'	report	Clarke 69'; Norwood 90+5'	Stadium: Cardiff City Stadium; Attendance: 20,564; Referee: Bobby Madley

24 March 2012 39	Coventry City	2–0	Portsmouth	Coventry
15:00	McSheffrey 55' (yellow card) 75'; Norwood 77'; Keogh (yellow card) 67'	report	Maguire (yellow card) 81'	Stadium: Ricoh Arena; Attendance: 15,809 (1,588 away); Referee: Geoff Eltringham

31 March 2012 40	Hull City	0–2	Coventry City	Kingston upon Hull
15:00	Stewart (yellow card) 41'; McLean (yellow card) 59'	report	Cooper 13' (o.g.); McDonald 86'; Platt (yellow card) 63'; McSheffrey (yellow card) 82'	Stadium: KC Stadium; Attendance: 17,279; Referee: Graham Salisbury

7 April 2012 41	Coventry City	2–2	Peterborough United	Coventry
15:00	McDonald 26'; McSheffrey 45' (pen.); Platt (yellow card) 87'; Hussey (yellow card) 90'	report	Sinclair 3', 76'	Stadium: Ricoh Arena; Attendance: 18,760 (1,786 away); Referee: Danny McDermid

9 April 2012 42	Bristol City	3–1	Coventry City	Bristol
15:00	Stead 47'; Bolasie 82'; Wood 90+4'; Adomah (yellow card) 38'; Foster (yellow card) 84'; Pitman (red card) 87'	report	Stead 33' (o.g.)	Stadium: Ashton Gate; Attendance: 19,003; Referee: Scott Mathieson

14 April 2012 43	Burnley	1–1	Coventry City	Burnley
15:00	Austin 20'; Marney (yellow card) 45+2'	report	Platt 67' (yellow card) 64'; Murphy (yellow card) 90+2'	Stadium: Turf Moor; Attendance: 13,398 (550 away); Referee: Andy Woolmer

17 April 2012 44	Coventry City	0–1	Millwall	Coventry
19:45	Clingan (yellow card) 17'	report	Lowry 66'; Barron (yellow card) 22'; Wright (yellow card) 23'; Taylor (yellow card) 56'; Dunne (yellow card) 69'; Smith (yellow card) 75'	Stadium: Ricoh Arena; Attendance: 13,974 (653 away); Referee: James Linington

21 April 2012 45	Coventry City	0–2	Doncaster Rovers	Coventry
15:00	Keogh (red card) 80'	report	Hayter 81' (pen.); Gillett 87'	Stadium: Ricoh Arena; Attendance: 15,124; Referee: Chris Foy

28 April 2012 46	Southampton	4–0	Coventry City	Southampton
12:30	Sharp 16'; Fonte 19'; Hooiveld 59'; Lallana 63'	report		Stadium: St. Mary's Stadium; Attendance: 32,363; Referee: Anthony Taylor

=== FA Cup ===
7 January 2012 Third round	Coventry City	1–2	Southampton	Coventry
15:00	McSheffrey 5'; Cranie (yellow card) 53'	report	Ward-Prowse 64'; Martin 82'	Stadium: Ricoh Arena; Attendance: 9,000 (1,734 away); Referee: Colin Webster

=== League Cup ===
9 August 2011 First round	Bury	3–1	Coventry City	Bury
19.45	Bishop 33'; Lowe 75', 88'; Worrall (yellow card) 44'; Mozika (yellow card) 69'; Sodje (yellow card) 71'	Report	O'Donovan 26'; Bigirimana (yellow card) 73'	Stadium: Gigg Lane; Attendance: 2,997 (1,625 away); Referee: Jock Waugh

== Championship data ==
=== League table ===
Pos	Team	Pld	W	D	L	GF	GA	GD	Pts	Promotion or relegation
20	Bristol City	46	12	13	21	44	68	−24	49	
21	Barnsley	46	13	9	24	49	74	−25	48	
22	Portsmouth (R)	46	13	11	22	50	59	−9	40 (Note: Portsmouth were deducted 10 points for entering administration.)	Relegation to League One
23	Coventry City (R)	46	9	13	24	41	65	−24	40	Relegation to League One
24	Doncaster Rovers (R)	46	8	12	26	43	80	−37	36	Relegation to League One

Updated to match(es) played on 28 April 2012. Source: BBC Sport
Rules for classification: 1) points; 2) goal difference; 3) number of goals scored.
(R) Relegated

=== Results summary ===
Overall								Home						Away					
Pld	W	D	L	GF	GA	GD	Pts	W	D	L	GF	GA	GD	W	D	L	GF	GA	GD
46	9	13	24	41	65	−24	40	8	7	8	28	26	+2	1	6	16	13	39	−26

Last updated: 27 April 2012.
Source: CCFC Championship Results

=== Round by round ===
Round	1	2	3	4	5	6	7	8	9	10	11	12	13	14	15	16	17	18	19	20	21	22	23	24	25	26	27	28	29	30	31	32	33	34	35	36	37	38	39	40	41	42	43	44	45	46
Ground	H	A	A	H	A	H	A	H	H	A	H	A	H	A	A	H	H	H	A	A	H	A	H	H	A	A	H	A	H	A	H	A	H	A	H	H	A	A	H	A	H	A	A	H	H	A
Result	L	L	L	D	D	W	L	D	D	L	W	D	L	D	L	L	L	D	L	L	L	L	W	W	L	L	W	L	L	L	W	L	W	L	D	D	D	D	W	W	D	L	D	L	L	L
Position	21	22	22	23	22	18	21	22	21	22	18	19	21	22	22	23	23	23	23	24	24	24	24	23	24	24	24	24	24	24	22	23	22	22	22	23	22	22	22	21	22	22	22	23	23	23

Updated to match(es) played on 27 April 2012. Source: Championship Results
A = Away; H = Home; W = Win; D = Draw; L = Loss

== Season statistics ==
=== Starts and goals ===
As of 27 April 2012

No.	Pos	Nat	Player	Total		Championship		League Cup		FA Cup	
No.	Pos	Nat	Player	Apps	Goals	Apps	Goals	Apps	Goals	Apps	Goals
1	GK	(Ireland) EIR	Joe Murphy	47	0	46+0	0	1+0	0	0+0	0
2	DF	(Ireland) EIR	Richard Keogh	47	0	45+0	0	1+0	0	1+0	0
3	DF	(England) ENG	Chris Hussey	31	0	28+1	0	1+0	0	0+1	0
4	MF	(Northern Ireland) NIR	Sammy Clingan	36	2	34+2	2	0+0	0	0+0	0
5	DF	(Iceland) ISL	Hermann Hreiðarsson	2	0	2+0	0	0+0	0	0+0	0
6	DF	(Scotland) SCO	James McPake (On loan to Hibernian)	6	0	3+2	0	0+1	0	0+0	0
7	MF	(Ireland) EIR	David Bell	29	0	19+9	0	1+0	0	0+0	0
8	MF	(England) ENG	Carl Baker	27	1	20+6	1	0+0	0	1+0	0
10	FW	(Wales) WAL	Freddy Eastwood (On loan to Southend United)	4	0	0+4	0	0+0	0	0+0	0
11	MF	(England) ENG	Gary McSheffrey	41	9	37+2	8	1+0	0	1+0	1
12	MF	(Ireland) EIR	Gary Deegan	25	3	19+5	3	0+0	0	1+0	0
13	GK	(England) ENG	Chris Dunn	3	0	0+2	0	0+0	0	1+0	0
14	FW	(England) ENG	Cody McDonald	23	4	16+7	4	0+0	0	0+0	0
15	DF	(England) ENG	Martin Cranie	40	0	38+0	0	1+0	0	1+0	0
16	MF	(Northern Ireland) NIR	Oliver Norwood (On loan from Manchester United)	18	2	17+1	2	0+0	0	0+0	0
18	FW	(England) ENG	Alex Nimely (On loan from Manchester City)	17	1	16+1	1	0+0	0	0+0	0
19	FW	(Ireland) EIR	Roy O'Donovan (On loan to Hibernian)	13	1	6+5	0	1+0	1	1+0	0
22	FW	(England) ENG	Clive Platt	33	4	23+10	4	0+0	0	0+0	0
23	GK	(Australia) AUS	Danny Ireland	0	0	0+0	0	0+0	0	0+0	0
24	DF	(England) ENG	Richard Wood	19	1	12+5	1	1+0	0	1+0	0
26	DF	(England) ENG	Jordan Clarke	19	1	17+2	1	0+0	0	0+0	0
27	FW	(England) ENG	Shaun Jeffers	4	0	0+3	0	0+0	0	0+1	0
28	FW	(England) ENG	Callum Wilson (On loan to Tamworth)	0	0	0+0	0	0+0	0	0+0	0
29	FW	(England) ENG	Billy Daniels	0	0	0+0	0	0+0	0	0+0	0
30	DF	(England) ENG	Nathan Cameron	14	0	11+3	0	0+0	0	0+0	0
31	DF	(England) ENG	Cyrus Christie	39	0	27+10	0	1+0	0	1+0	0
32	MF	(England) ENG	Conor Thomas	29	1	24+3	1	0+1	0	1+0	0
33	GK	(England) ENG	Lee Burge	0	0	0+0	0	0+0	0	0+0	0
34	MF	(Democratic Republic of the Congo) COD	Gaël Bigirimana	28	0	16+10	0	1+0	0	1+0	0
35	MF	(England) ENG	Josh Ruffels	2	0	0+1	0	0+0	0	0+1	0
36	DF	(England) ENG	Aaron Phillips	0	0	0+0	0	0+0	0	0+0	0
37	DF	(England) ENG	Jordan Willis	3	0	1+2	0	0+0	0	0+0	0
38	MF	(Wales) WAL	Will Roberts	1	0	0+1	0	0+0	0	0+0	0
39	DF	(England) ENG	Joe Henderson	1	0	0+1	0	0+0	0	0+0	0
Players played for Coventry this season who have left before the season ends:
9	FW	(England) ENG	Lukas Jutkiewicz (On loan to Middlesbrough)	26	9	25+0	9	1+0	0	0+0	0
25	MF	(England) ENG	Gary Gardner (On loan from Aston Villa)	4	1	4+0	1	0+0	0	0+0	0

Notes:
- Player substitutions are not included.

=== Goalscorers ===
No.	Flag	Pos	Name	Championship	League Cup	FA Cup	Total
9	(England)	FW	Lukas Jutkiewicz	9	0	0	9
11	(England)	MF	Gary McSheffrey	8	0	1	9
14	(England)	FW	Cody McDonald	4	0	0	4
22	(England)	FW	Clive Platt	4	0	0	4
12	(Republic of Ireland)	MF	Gary Deegan	3	0	0	3
			Own goal	3	0	0	3
4	(Northern Ireland)	MF	Sammy Clingan	2	0	0	2
16	(Northern Ireland)	MF	Oliver Norwood	2	0	0	2
8	(England)	MF	Carl Baker	1	0	0	1
18	(England)	FW	Alex Nimely	1	0	0	1
19	(Republic of Ireland)	FW	Roy O'Donovan	0	1	0	1
24	(England)	DF	Richard Wood	1	0	0	1
25	(England)	MF	Gary Gardner	1	0	0	1
26	(England)	DF	Jordan Clarke	1	0	0	1
32	(England)	MF	Conor Thomas	1	0	0	1

=== Assists ===
No.	Flag	Pos	Name	Championship	League Cup	FA Cup	Total
11	(England)	MF	Gary McSheffrey	5	0	0	5
31	(England)	DF	Cyrus Christie	3	0	1	4
3	(England)	DF	Chris Hussey	3	0	0	3
4	(Northern Ireland)	MF	Sammy Clingan	2	0	0	2
7	(Republic of Ireland)	MF	David Bell	1	1	0	2
2	(Republic of Ireland)	DF	Richard Keogh	1	0	0	1
8	(England)	MF	Carl Baker	1	0	0	1
16	(Northern Ireland)	MF	Oliver Norwood	1	0	0	1
18	(England)	FW	Alex Nimely	1	0	0	1
19	(Republic of Ireland)	FW	Roy O'Donovan	1	0	0	1
22	(England)	FW	Clive Platt	1	0	0	1
24	(England)	DF	Richard Wood	1	0	0	1
26	(England)	DF	Jordan Clarke	1	0	0	1

=== Yellow cards ===
No.	Flag	Pos	Name	Championship	League Cup	FA Cup	Total
11	(England)	MF	Gary McSheffrey	6	0	0	(yellow card) 6
31	(England)	DF	Cyrus Christie	5	0	0	(yellow card) 5
12	(Republic of Ireland)	MF	Gary Deegan	5	0	0	(yellow card) 5
24	(England)	DF	Richard Wood	5	0	0	(yellow card) 5
3	(England)	DF	Chris Hussey	4	0	0	(yellow card) 4
2	(Republic of Ireland)	DF	Richard Keogh	4	0	0	(yellow card) 4
1	(Republic of Ireland)	GK	Joe Murphy	4	0	0	(yellow card) 4
7	(Republic of Ireland)	MF	David Bell	3	0	0	(yellow card) 3
34	(Democratic Republic of the Congo)	MF	Gaël Bigirimana	2	1	0	(yellow card) 3
26	(England)	DF	Jordan Clarke	3	0	0	(yellow card) 3
18	(England)	FW	Alex Nimely	3	0	0	(yellow card) 3
22	(England)	FW	Clive Platt	3	0	0	(yellow card) 3
8	(England)	MF	Carl Baker	2	0	0	(yellow card) 2
30	(England)	DF	Nathan Cameron	2	0	0	(yellow card) 2
4	(Northern Ireland)	MF	Sammy Clingan	2	0	0	(yellow card) 2
15	(England)	DF	Martin Cranie	1	0	1	(yellow card) 2
25	(England)	MF	Gary Gardner	1	0	0	(yellow card) 1
5	(Iceland)	DF	Hermann Hreiðarsson	1	0	0	(yellow card) 1
19	(Republic of Ireland)	FW	Roy O'Donovan	1	0	0	(yellow card) 1
32	(England)	MF	Conor Thomas	1	0	0	(yellow card) 1

=== Red cards ===
No.	Flag	Pos	Name	Championship	League Cup	FA Cup	Total
8	(England)	MF	Carl Baker	1	0	0	(red card) 1
34	(Democratic Republic of the Congo)	MF	Gaël Bigirimana	1	0	0	(red card) 1
2	(Republic of Ireland)	DF	Richard Keogh	1	0	0	(red card) 1

=== Captains ===
No.	Pos.	Name	Starts
4	MF	(Northern Ireland) Sammy Clingan	34
2	DF	(Republic of Ireland) Richard Keogh	12
15	DF	(England) Martin Cranie	1
11	MF	(England) Gary McSheffrey	1

=== Penalties Awarded ===
Date	Success?	Penalty Taker	Opponent	Competition
2011-09-10	✓	(England) Lukas Jutkiewicz	Derby County	Championship
2011-09-24	✗	(England) Lukas Jutkiewicz	Reading	Championship
2012-02-04	✓	(Northern Ireland) Sammy Clingan	Ipswich Town	Championship
2012-02-14	✓	(England) Gary McSheffrey	Leeds United	Championship
2012-02-14	✓	(England) Gary McSheffrey	Leeds United	Championship
2012-03-03	✗	(Northern Ireland) Sammy Clingan	Leicester City	Championship
2012-03-21	✗	(England) Gary McSheffrey	Cardiff City	Championship
2012-04-07	✓	(England) Gary McSheffrey	Peterborough United	Championship
2012-04-18	✗	(England) Gary McSheffrey	Millwall	Championship

=== Suspensions served ===
Date	Matches Missed	Suspended Player	Reason	Missed Opponents
9 August 2011	3	(England) Carl Baker	(red card) vs. Leicester City	Bury (A), Birmingham City (A), Crystal Palace (A)
29 October 2011	3	(Democratic Republic of the Congo) Gaël Bigirimana	(red card) vs. Burnley	Doncaster Rovers (A), Millwall (A), Southampton (H)
28 April 2012	1	(England) Richard Keogh	(red card) vs. Doncaster Rovers	Southampton (A)

=== Monthly & Weekly Awards ===
Award	Date	Player
Championship Team of the Week	22 August 2011	(England) Cyrus Christie
Championship Team of the Week	12 September 2011	(England) Cyrus Christie
Championship Team of the Week	18 October 2011	(Republic of Ireland) Joe Murphy
Championship Team of the Week	18 October 2011	(England) Chris Hussey
Championship Team of the Week	27 February 2012	(Republic of Ireland) Richard Keogh
Championship Team of the Week	19 March 2012	(Republic of Ireland) Joe Murphy
Championship Team of the Week	25 March 2012	(England) Chris Hussey
Championship Team of the Week	2 April 2012	(Republic of Ireland) Richard Keogh

=== End of Season Awards ===
Award	Winner
Player of The Season Award	(Republic of Ireland) Richard Keogh
Young Player of the Season Award	(England) Cyrus Christie
Players' Player of The Season Award	(Republic of Ireland) Richard Keogh
Top Scorer Award	(England) Gary McSheffrey
Goal of The Season Award	(England) Jordan Clarke
Community Player of The Season Award	(Democratic Republic of the Congo) Gaël Bigirimana
Coventry Supporters' Club Player of the Season Award	(Republic of Ireland) Richard Keogh
London Supporters' Club Player of the Season Award	(Republic of Ireland) Richard Keogh
Welsh Supporters' Club Player of the Season Award	(Republic of Ireland) Richard Keogh
Irish Supporters' Club Player of the Season Award	(Republic of Ireland) Richard Keogh
Championship Apprentice Award	(Democratic Republic of the Congo) Gaël Bigirimana
Coventry City U18's Player of the Year Award	(England) Jordan Willis

=== International Appearances ===
Date	No.	Pos.	Name	Match	Stats	Caps
10 August 2011	4	MF	(Northern Ireland) Sammy Clingan	Northern Ireland 4 – 0 Faroe Islands	90 Minutes	26
6 September 2011	4	MF	(Northern Ireland) Sammy Clingan	Estonia 4 – 1 Northern Ireland	90 Minutes	27
7 October 2011	4	MF	(Northern Ireland) Sammy Clingan	Northern Ireland 1 – 2 Estonia	32 Minutes	28
29 February 2012	4	MF	(Northern Ireland) Sammy Clingan	Northern Ireland 0 – 3 Norway	90 Minutes	29
8 March 2012	37	DF	(England) Jordan Willis	England Under-18 3 – 0 Poland Under-18	45 Minutes	1

=== Overall ===
Games played	48 (46 Championship, 1 League Cup, 1 FA Cup)
Games won	9 (9 Championship, 0 League Cup, 0 FA Cup)
Games drawn	13 (13 Championship, 0 League Cup, 0 FA Cup)
Games lost	26 (24 Championship, 1 League Cup, 1 FA Cup)
Goals scored	43 (41 Championship, 1 League Cup, 1 FA Cup)
Goals conceded	70 (65 Championship, 3 League Cup, 2 FA Cup)
Goal difference	−27
Yellow cards	60 (58 Championship, 1 League Cup, 1 FA Cup)
Red cards	3 (3 Championship, 0 League Cup, 0 FA Cup)
Worst discipline	(England) Richard Keogh (4 (yellow card) , 1 (red card) )
Best result	W 2–0 (H) v Derby County – Championship – 10 September 2011
	W 2–0 (H) v Brighton & Hove Albion – Championship – 31 December 2011
	W 3–1 (H) v Middlesbrough – Championship – 21 January 2012
	W 2–0 (H) v Portsmouth – Championship – 24 March 2012
	W 2–0 (A) v Hull City – Championship – 31 March 2012
Worst result	L 4–0 (A) v Southampton – Championship – 27 April 2012
Most appearances	(Republic of Ireland) Richard Keogh (47 appearances)
Top scorer	(England) Lukas Jutkiewicz (9 goals)
	(England) Gary McSheffrey (9 goals)
Points	40 / 138 (28.99%)

== Transfers ==
=== Transfers in ===
Player	From	Date	Fee
(England) Chris Dunn	(England) Northampton Town	1 July 2011	Undisclosed
(Republic of Ireland) Joe Murphy	(England) Scunthorpe United	1 July 2011	Free
(England) Cody McDonald	(England) Norwich City	31 August 2011	£500,000
(Iceland) Hermann Hreiðarsson	(England) Portsmouth	16 January 2012	Free

=== Transfers out ===
Player	To	Date	Fee
(England) Conor Grogan	Released	30 June 2011	Free
(England) Luke Adams	Released	30 June 2011	Free
(Republic of Ireland) Michael Quirke	(England) Coalville Town	30 June 2011	Free
(Scotland) Michael McIndoe	Retired	30 June 2011	Free
(England) Connor Gudger	(England) Hinckley United	1 July 2011	Free
(Jamaica) Marlon King	(England) Birmingham City	1 July 2011	Free
(Republic of Ireland) Keiren Westwood	(England) Sunderland	1 July 2011	Free
(Republic of Ireland) Stephen O'Halloran	(England) Carlisle United	1 July 2011	Free
(England) Isaac Osbourne	(Scotland) Aberdeen	1 July 2011	Free
(England) Alistair Worby	(Scotland) St Johnstone	1 July 2011	Free
(Iceland) Aron Gunnarsson	(Wales) Cardiff City	8 July 2011	Undisclosed
(Republic of Ireland) Lee Carsley	(England) Coach: Coventry City U18s	22 July 2011	Retired
(England) Ben Turner	(Wales) Cardiff City	31 August 2011	£750,000
(England) Lukas Jutkiewicz	(England) Middlesbrough	16 January 2012	£1,300,000

=== Loans in ===
Player	From	Date from	Date until
(England) Gary Gardner	(England) Aston Villa	24 November 2011	21 December 2011
(England) Alex Nimely	(England) Manchester City	12 January 2012	30 June 2012
(Northern Ireland) Oliver Norwood	(England) Manchester United	31 January 2012	30 June 2012

=== Loans out ===
Player	To	Date from	Date until
(England) Jamel Wiseman	(England) Nuneaton Town	15 November 2011	3 January 2011
(England) Callum Wilson	(England) Tamworth	29 December 2011	31 January 2012
(England) Lukas Jutkiewicz	(England) Middlesbrough	14 January 2012	16 January 2012
(Scotland) James McPake	(Scotland) Hibernian	23 January 2012	30 June 2012
(Republic of Ireland) Roy O'Donovan	(Scotland) Hibernian	31 January 2012	30 June 2012
(Wales) Freddy Eastwood	(England) Southend United	22 March 2012	30 June 2012

=== Trials ===
Player	From	Trial Date	Signed
(Republic of Ireland) Killian Brennan	(Republic of Ireland) Bohemians	July 2011	✗
(Suriname) Marvin Hasselbaink	(Netherlands) Almere City	November 2011	✗
(Poland) Mariusz Kisiel	(England) Chasetown	January 2012	✗
(Iceland) Kjartan Finnbogason	(Iceland) KR Reykjavik	January 2012	✗
