= Dulieu =

Dulieu is a surname. Notable people with the surname include:

- Jean Dulieu (1921–2006), pseudonym of Jan van Oort, Dutch writer and cartoonist
- Ken Dulieu, English businessman
