= Jordan Clarke (footballer) =

English footballer (born 1991)

Personal information
- Full name: Jordan Lee Clarke
- Date of birth: 19 November 1991 (age 34)
- Place of birth: Coventry, England
- Height: 1.83 m (6 ft 0 in)
- Position: Defender

Team information
- Current team: Oldham Athletic
- Number: 2

Youth career
- Coventry City

Senior career*
Years	Team	Apps	(Gls)
2008–2015	Coventry City	125	(4)
2014–2015	→ Yeovil Town (loan)	5	(2)
2015–2021	Scunthorpe United	154	(5)
2021–2023	Oldham Athletic	58	(1)

International career^{‡}
2009	England U19	4	(0)
2011	England U20	1	(0)
- * Club domestic league appearances and goals as of 21:20, 3 June 2023 (UTC) ‡ National team caps and goals as of 21:15, 11 March 2012 (UTC)

Jordan Lee Clarke (born 19 November 1991) is an English professional footballer whose last club was Oldham Athletic. He is a free agent.

== Club career ==
A former captain of the academy U16 side, Clarke made his professional debut for his hometown club as a substitute on 9 August 2009, in a 2–1 Football League Championship win against Ipswich Town. Three days later, he made his full debut against Hartlepool in the League Cup, playing 104 minutes. He was sent off after a controversial second yellow card in only his fourth league start in the away loss to Derby County on 6 November. On 9 December, he was injured and substituted in the first half during the 2–0 loss to Newcastle United at home. It was later confirmed that he will be out for around three months due to knee ligament damage. On 22 October 2010 he scored his first goal for the club in a 3–0 win against Barnsley at the Ricoh Arena. In March 2012 he scored his second goal for Coventry in a 2–2 draw away to Cardiff City.

On 1 July 2013, Coventry manager Steven Pressley confirmed that Jordan Clarke was one of 8 players surplus to requirements at the club. However, this decision was reversed a week later and Clarke was brought back into the first team squad. Since then Jordan Clarke has been primarily used as a centre-back at the club and put in a number of impressive performances to earn a new long-term contract.

On 29 October 2014, Clarke joined fellow League One side Yeovil Town on loan until 5 January 2015, in a deal which saw Aaron Martin move in the other direction.

On 10 January 2015, Clarke signed for League One side Scunthorpe United for an undisclosed fee agreeing a two-and-a-half-year deal.

On 7 December 2019 Clarke was allegedly racially abused by Forest Green Rovers fans.

=== Oldham Athletic ===
He was one of 17 players released by Scunthorpe at the end of the 2020–21 season.

Clarke signed to Oldham Athletic in June 2021. After two seasons at the club, he was released at the end of the 2022–23 season.

== International career ==
Clarke was called into the England under-19 squad for the friendly against Russia in September 2009. He played a large part in helping England advance to the elite qualification round for the 2010 European Championships.

== Personal life ==
Clarke attended the Coundon Court School in Coundon, Coventry. He was in a relationship with Chloe Goodman.

== Career statistics ==
As of end of 2022–23 season

Appearances and goals by club, season and competition
Club	Season	League			FA Cup		League Cup		Other		Total	
Club	Season	Division	Apps	Goals	Apps	Goals	Apps	Goals	Apps	Goals	Apps	Goals
Coventry City	2008–09	Championship	0	0	0	0	0	0	—		0	0
Coventry City	2009–10	Championship	12	0	0	0	1	0	—		13	0
Coventry City	2010–11	Championship	21	1	0	0	1	0	—		22	1
Coventry City	2011–12	Championship	19	1	0	0	0	0	—		19	1
Coventry City	2012–13	League One	20	0	3	0	2	0	3 (Note: Appearance(s) in Football League Trophy)	0	28	0
Coventry City	2013–14	League One	41	1	4	0	1	0	1	0	47	1
Coventry City	2014–15	League One	12	1	0	0	1	0	2	0	15	1
Coventry City	Total		125	4	7	0	6	0	6	0	144	4
Yeovil Town (loan)	2014–15	League One	5	2	2	1	—		—		7	3
Scunthorpe United	2014–15	League One	24	0	—		—		—		24	0
Scunthorpe United	2015–16	League One	33	2	2	0	1	0	0	0	36	2
Scunthorpe United	2016–17	League One	23	1	0	0	2	0	6 (Note: Four appearances in EFL Trophy, two appearances in League One play-offs)	0	31	1
Scunthorpe United	2017–18	League One	23	0	2	0	1	0	3 (Note: Two appearances in EFL Trophy, one appearance in League One play-offs)	0	29	0
Scunthorpe United	2018–19	League One	15	1	1	0	1	0	1 (Note: Appearance(s) in EFL Trophy)	0	18	1
Scunthorpe United	2019–20	League Two	12	0	0	0	0	0	5	0	17	0
Scunthorpe United	2020–21	League Two	24	1	0	0	0	0	0	0	24	1
Scunthorpe United	Total		154	5	5	0	5	0	15	0	179	5
Oldham Athletic	2021–22	League Two	40	1	2	0	2	0	2	0	46	1
Oldham Athletic	2022–23	National League	18	0	3	0	—		0	0	21	0
Oldham Athletic	Total		58	1	5	0	2	0	2	0	67	1
Career total			342	12	19	1	13	0	23	0	397	13
