= Louis Garner =

English footballer

Personal information
- Date of birth: 31 October 1994 (age 31)
- Place of birth: Manchester, England
- Position: Midfielder

Team information
- Current team: Coventry City
- Number: 30

Youth career
- Coventry City

Senior career*
| Years | Team | Apps | (Gls) |
| 2012–2014 | Coventry City | 3 | (0) |
- * Club domestic league appearances and goals as of 17:30, 2 December 2013

Louis Garner (born 31 October 1994) is an English footballer. He is a midfielder who made three substitute appearances in Football League One for Coventry City in 2013–14. He was released by the club at the end of that season.

== Career ==
Garner made his professional debut as a substitute on 5 October 2013 in a 1-0 Football League One win over Stevenage, coming on to replace the injured Cyrus Christie after 87 minutes.

== Career statistics ==
Stats according to Soccerbase

As of 2 December 2013

| Club | Season | League | | | FA Cup | | League Cup | | Other^{[A]} | | Total | |
| Club | Season | Division | Apps | Goals | Apps | Goals | Apps | Goals | Apps | Goals | Apps | Goals |
|---|---|---|---|---|---|---|---|---|---|---|---|---|
| Coventry City | 2012–13 | League One | 0 | 0 | 0 | 0 | 0 | 0 | 0 | 0 | 0 | 0 |
| Coventry City | 2013–14 | League One | 3 | 0 | 0 | 0 | 0 | 0 | 0 | 0 | 3 | 0 |
| Total | | | 3 | 0 | 0 | 0 | 0 | 0 | 0 | 0 | 3 | 0 |
| Career totals | | | 2 | 0 | 0 | 0 | 0 | 0 | 0 | 0 | 2 | 0 |
