= Conor Thomas =

English footballer (born 1993)

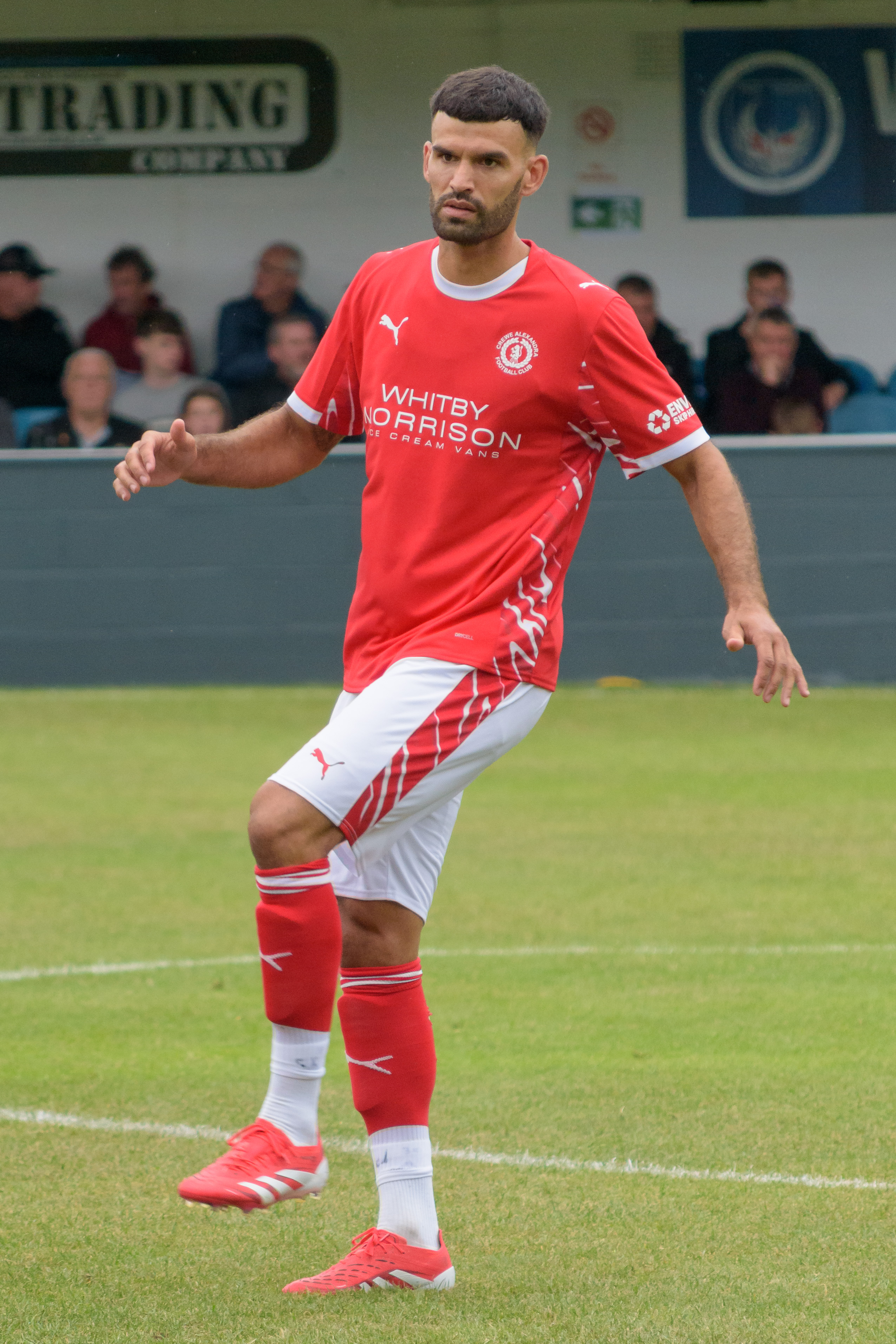
- Thomas playing for Crewe Alexandra in 2025

Personal information
- Full name: Conor Thomas
- Date of birth: 29 October 1993 (age 33)
- Place of birth: Coventry, England
- Height: 6 ft 2 in (1.88 m)
- Position: Midfielder

Team information
- Current team: Crewe Alexandra
- Number: 8

Youth career
- –2010: Coventry City

Senior career*
Years	Team	Apps	(Gls)
2010–2016	Coventry City	100	(1)
2011	→ Liverpool (loan)	0	(0)
2016–2017	Swindon Town	35	(1)
2017–2018	ATK	18	(0)
2018–2022	Cheltenham Town	120	(18)
2022–	Crewe Alexandra	125	(5)

International career
2009	England U17	6	(0)
2011	England U18	1	(0)
- * Club domestic league appearances and goals as of 16:24, 21 November 2026 (UTC)

Conor Thomas (born 29 October 1993) is an English professional footballer who plays as a midfielder for EFL League Two club Crewe Alexandra. He has previously played for Coventry City, Swindon Town, former Indian Super League club ATK and Cheltenham Town.

== Club career ==
=== Coventry City ===
Thomas joined the Coventry City Academy after being spotted playing for local side Christ The King FC. He was approached by scouts from Aston Villa and Birmingham too, but decided to start his career with the Sky Blues. He made his professional debut as a substitute on 8 January 2011 in a 2–1 FA Cup win over Crystal Palace, coming on to replace Gary McSheffrey after 72 minutes and made his full debut for the club on 25 January, again during an FA Cup tie, against Birmingham City.

He joined Premier League club Liverpool initially on loan on 31 January 2011, with a view to a permanent move but after playing and training with Liverpool's reserves and training with the first team on seven occasions he returned to Coventry after a hamstring injury and the mutual decision to end the loan. Thomas scored his first senior goal on 31 January 2012 in a 2–1 defeat away to Blackpool, opening the scoring in the 59th minute.

After a six-year spell at Coventry, Thomas was released by the club in June 2016.

=== Swindon Town ===
On 4 July 2016, following his release from Coventry City, Thomas joined fellow League One side Swindon Town on a three-year deal. On 6 August 2016, Thomas made his Swindon Town debut in a 1–0 victory against his former side, Coventry City, featuring for the entire 90 minutes. On 25 March 2017, Thomas scored his first goal for Swindon, netting the winner in their 1–0 victory over Millwall in the 90th minute.

=== ATK ===
On 23 August 2017, Thomas joined Indian Super League side ATK.

=== Cheltenham Town ===
On 25 May 2018, Thomas returned to England to join League Two side Cheltenham Town on a two-year deal. He helped Cheltenham to the 2019–20 League Two play-off semi-finals, only to lose 3–2 on aggregate against Northampton Town. After four seasons, on 6 May 2022, Thomas left the club after not being able to reach an agreement with the club on new terms.

=== Crewe Alexandra ===
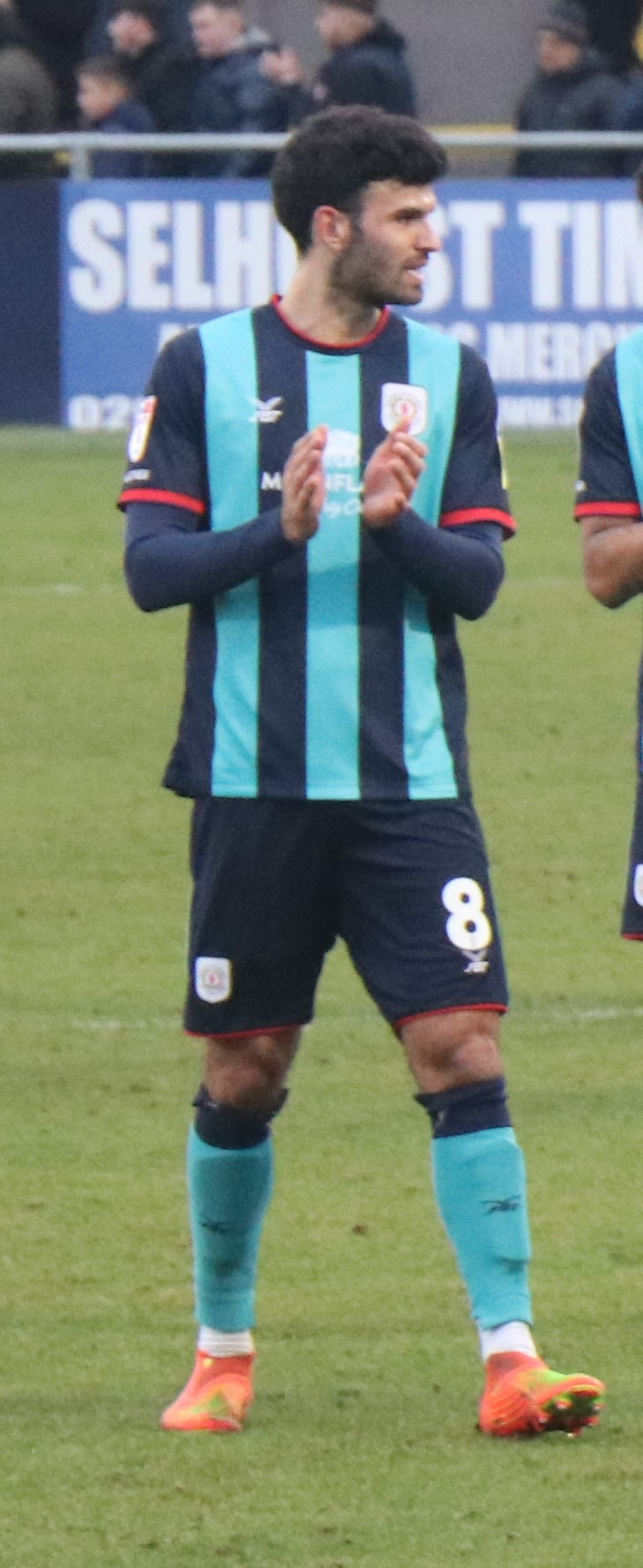
Thomas playing for Crewe Alexandra in 2023.

On 19 May 2022, he joined Crewe Alexandra. He started in Crewe's opening game of the 2022–23 season, a 2–1 victory over Rochdale at Spotland. and he scored his first Crewe goal in the side's 2–1 win over former club Swindon Town at Gresty Road on 29 April 2023.

In May 2024, Thomas signed a new two-year deal, keeping him at Crewe until the summer of 2026. In late October, Thomas sustained a freak knee injury as a result of a teammate taking an ill-timed shot in training, ruling him out of action until early 2025. He eventually made a substitute appearance in Crewe's 3–1 win at Chesterfield on 1 March 2025. He started his fourth season with Crewe by scoring twice in the side's 3–1 victory at Salford City on 2 August 2025. In June 2026, Thomas signed a new one-year contract at Crewe.

== International career ==
Thomas was an England under-17 international. He played in the final of the 2009 Nordic Tournament and was awarded a winner's medal following the side's victory over Scotland.

== Coaching career ==
In March 2023, Thomas launched the Conor Thomas Academy, offering one-on-one and small group football coaching sessions to young players in the Crewe, Sandbach, and Stoke areas. The academy aims to bridge the gap between amateur and academy-level football.

== Media involvement ==
Conor Thomas has undertaken football commentary work with BBC Radio Stoke. He participated in studio discussions with presenter Samantha Fletcher-Goodwin and contributed to live match commentary at Crewe Alexandra home games alongside Graham McGarry and Peter Morse.

== Career statistics ==
As of match played on 21 November 2026

Appearances and goals by club, season and competition
Club	Season	League			National Cup		League Cup		Other		Total	
Club	Season	Division	Apps	Goals	Apps	Goals	Apps	Goals	Apps	Goals	Apps	Goals
Coventry City	2010–11	Championship	0	0	2	0	0	0	—		2	0
Coventry City	2011–12	Championship	27	1	1	0	1	0	—		29	1
Coventry City	2012–13	League One	11	0	1	0	0	0	1 (Note: Appearances in Football League Trophy)	0	13	0
Coventry City	2013–14	League One	43	0	4	0	1	0	1	0	49	0
Coventry City	2014–15	League One	16	0	0	0	0	0	3	0	19	0
Coventry City	2015–16	League One	3	0	1	0	0	0	1	0	5	0
Coventry City	Total		100	1	9	0	2	0	6	0	117	1
Liverpool (loan)	2010–11	Premier League	0	0	—		—		0	0	0	0
Swindon Town	2016–17	League One	33	1	1	0	1	0	2	0	37	1
Swindon Town	2017–18	League Two	2	0	0	0	1	0	0	0	3	0
Swindon Town	Total		35	1	1	0	2	0	2	0	40	1
ATK	2017–18	Indian Super League	18	0	2	0	—		—		20	0
Cheltenham Town	2018–19	League Two	32	6	3	0	2	1	4	0	41	7
Cheltenham Town	2019–20	League Two	26	6	2	0	1	0	3 (Note: One appearance in EFL Trophy, two appearances and one goal in League Two play-offs)	1	32	7
Cheltenham Town	2020–21	League Two	38	5	3	0	2	0	0	0	43	5
Cheltenham Town	2021–22	League One	24	1	2	0	2	0	2	0	30	1
Cheltenham Town	Total		120	18	10	0	7	1	9	1	146	20
Crewe Alexandra	2022–23	League Two	44	1	2	0	0	0	1	0	47	1
Crewe Alexandra	2023–24	League Two	25	1	3	0	1	0	5 (Note: Two appearances in EFL Trophy and three appearances in League Two play-offs)	0	34	1
Crewe Alexandra	2024–25	League Two	19	0	0	0	0	0	0	0	19	0
Crewe Alexandra	2025–26	League Two	28	3	1	0	0	0	0	0	29	3
Crewe Alexandra	2026–27	League Two	9	0	1	1	0	0	0	0	10	1
Crewe Alexandra	Total		125	5	7	1	1	0	6	0	139	6
Career total			398	25	29	1	12	1	23	1	462	28

== Honours ==
Cheltenham Town

- EFL League Two: 2020–21
