= Stuart Urquhart =

Scottish footballer

Personal information
- Date of birth: 26 March 1995 (age 31)
- Place of birth: Glasgow, Scotland
- Position: Defender

Youth career
- 2006–2009: Hamilton Academical
- 2009–2012: Rangers

Senior career*
Years	Team	Apps	(Gls)
2012–2013	Rangers	0	(0)
2013	→ Dumbarton (loan)	3	(0)
2013–2014	Coventry City	0	(0)
2014–2015	Dunfermline Athletic	12	(0)

International career
2010–2012	Scotland U17	8	(0)
2013	Scotland U18	2	(0)
- * Club domestic league appearances and goals as of 28 March 2015

Stuart Urquhart (born 26 March 1995) is a Scottish footballer who plays as a defender. Urquhart, who most recently played for Dunfermline Athletic, has also played for the Scotland U17 team.

== Playing career ==
=== Club ===
Urquhart made his professional debut for Dumbarton (on loan from Rangers) on 16 February 2013 in a 3–2 Scottish First Division match, playing the whole of a loss to Raith Rovers. He went on to play two more Scottish First Division games whilst at Dumbarton, featuring in a 0–2 loss against Falkirk and a 2–2 draw against Cowdenbeath.

On 18 September 2013, Urquhart signed a three-year contract with Coventry City after turning down a contract at Rangers.

Urquhart left Coventry City by mutual consent on 18 August 2014 and on 23 August joined Scottish League One team Dunfermline Athletic on a one-year deal. After making fourteen appearances for Dunfermline, Urquhart was released at the end of the season.

=== International ===
Urquhart made his international debut for the Scotland U-17 in a 1–0 UEFA European Under-17 Championship win against Macedonia U-17. He went on to play 7 more games for the Under-17's squad, matches against Luxembourg U-17, Switzerland U-17, San Marino U-17, Macedonia U-17, Lithuania U-17, Iceland U-17 and Denmark U-17.

== Personal life ==
After leaving Dunfermline Athletic in May 2015, Urquhart announced that he had been diagnosed with a heart problem, potentially bringing an end to his playing career.

== Career statistics ==
Stats according to,

As of 5 May 2015

Appearances and goals by club, season and competition
Club	Season	League			FA Cup		League Cup		Other		Total	
Club	Season	Division	Apps	Goals	Apps	Goals	Apps	Goals	Apps	Goals	Apps	Goals
Rangers	2012–13	Scottish Division Three	0	0	0	0	0	0	0	0	0	0
Dumbarton (loan)	2012–13	Scottish Division One	3	0	0	0	0	0	0	0	3	0
Coventry City	2013–14	League One	0	0	0	0	0	0	0	0	0	0
Dunfermline Athletic	2014–15	Scottish League One	12	0	2	0	0	0	0	0	14	0
Career totals			15	0	2	0	0	0	0	0	17	0
