= Cyrus Christie =

Irish-English footballer (born 1992)

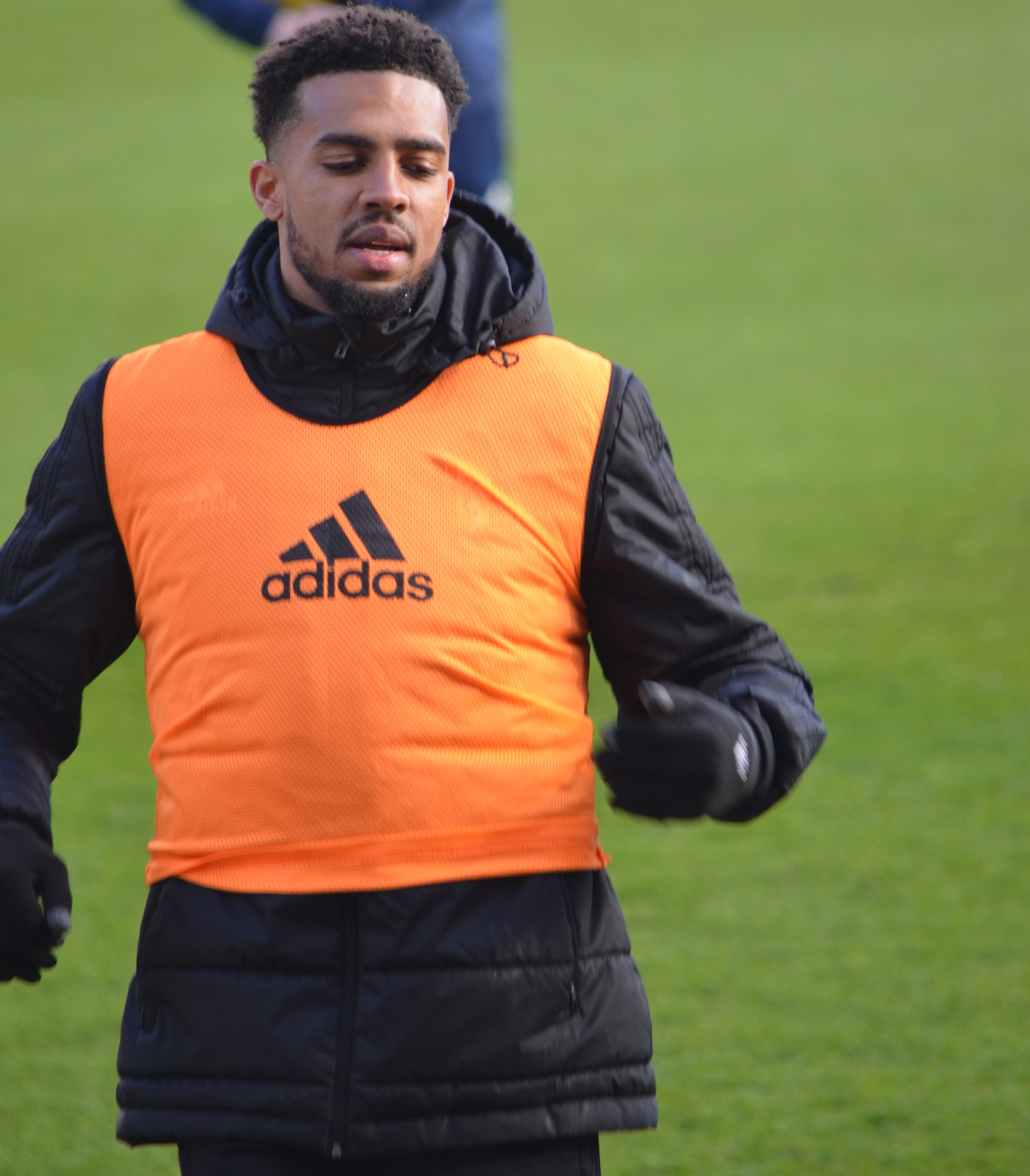
- Christie warming up for Fulham in 2018

Personal information
- Full name: Cyrus Sylvester Frederick Christie
- Date of birth: 30 September 1992 (age 34)
- Place of birth: Coventry, England
- Height: 6 ft 2 in (1.88 m)
- Position: Right-back

Team information
- Current team: Hanoi FC
- Number: 44

Youth career
- –2010: Coventry City

Senior career*
Years	Team	Apps	(Gls)
2010–2014	Coventry City	102	(3)
2011	→ Nuneaton Town (loan)	5	(0)
2011	→ Hinckley United (loan)	8	(0)
2014–2017	Derby County	107	(2)
2017–2018	Middlesbrough	25	(1)
2018–2022	Fulham	52	(1)
2020–2021	→ Nottingham Forest (loan)	44	(0)
2022	→ Swansea City (loan)	23	(3)
2022–2024	Hull City	54	(3)
2024–2025	Swansea City	11	(0)
2025–2026	Bolton Wanderers	23	(0)
2026–	Hanoi FC	2	(0)

International career
2014–2022	Republic of Ireland	30	(2)
- * Club domestic league appearances and goals as of 10 April 2026 (UTC)

Cyrus Sylvester Frederick Christie (born 30 September 1992) is a professional footballer who plays as a right-back for V.League 1 club Hanoi FC.

== Early and personal life ==
Christie was born in Coventry, West Midlands. He is a nephew of the late boxer Errol Christie. Christie is Jamaican on his father's side, and his mother was born in France and is of Lebanese descent. Christie holds Jamaican, French and Lebanese citizenship from his parents.

== Club career ==
=== Coventry City ===
Christie made his first-team debut for Championship club Coventry City against Morecambe on 10 August 2010, in a 2–0 away defeat in the League Cup.

He joined Conference North club Nuneaton Town on loan in January 2011, but was recalled by Coventry after two starts and three substitute appearances. He then went on a 'work experience' loan to another Conference North club Hinckley United, in February 2011, where he made eight appearances.

After Coventry's first league win of the 2011–12 season, a 2–0 home win against Derby County, Christie made it into the Championship Team of the Week. The following season, he was in the League One side of the week after putting a man of the match performance against Leyton Orient. The following game on 3 November, in the first round of the FA Cup, he scored his first goal in a 3–0 win against Arlesey Town and was praised by manager Mark Robins. On 8 December he scored his first league goal in a 5–1 home win over Walsall.

In 2012, Coventry were relegated to League One.

=== Derby County ===
On 10 July 2014, Christie returned to the Championship on a three-year contract at Derby County. He was out of contract at Coventry, but the two clubs agreed an undisclosed fee for the player since he came through Coventry's academy and was under 23 years old.

Christie made his debut against Rotherham United on 9 August, where he provided an assist for goalscorer Jeff Hendrick in a 1–0 home victory. On 20 February 2016, he scored his first Rams goal in his 74th appearance, a 3–1 win at Brentford. His short-range strike with seven minutes remaining was his first club goal since March 2013 and ended an eight-game winless run at the start of the year.

=== Middlesbrough ===
On 7 July 2017, Christie and Jonny Howson moved for undisclosed fees to newly relegated Championship club Middlesbrough. He made his debut on 5 August as the season began with a 1–0 loss at Wolverhampton Wanderers, and scored his first goal for the club in a 1–1 draw away to Fulham on 23 September.

=== Fulham ===
On 31 January 2018, Christie joined Championship side Fulham for an undisclosed fee. He made his debut for Fulham in a 1–1 draw at Bristol City on 21 February 2018. At the end of the season, Fulham were promoted to the Premier League.

Christie scored his first goal for Fulham in an EFL Cup tie against Millwall on 25 September 2018.

In August 2019, Christie accused a Fulham fan of assaulting his sister and the fan's wife of using racist language at the club's opening game of the season, a 1–0 loss at Barnsley.

On 18 September 2020, Christie joined Nottingham Forest on a season-long loan. He made 44 league appearances for the club across the 2020–21 season.

On 13 January 2022, Christie joined EFL Championship side Swansea City on loan for the remainder of the 2021–22 season. He scored his first goal for the club against Bristol City on 13 February 2022. In May 2022 while on international duty, Christie revealed that he was now a free agent as he would not be signing a new contract at Fulham following the end of his contract, he also confirmed that he had interest from clubs outside of England interested in him.

=== Hull City ===
On 26 August 2022, Christie moved on a free transfer to Championship club Hull City. On 19 May 2024, the club announced he would be released in the summer when his contract expired.

=== Swansea City ===
On 1 November 2024, Christie joined EFL Championship side Swansea City on a free contract until the end of the 2024–2025 season.

=== Bolton Wanderers ===
On 1 September 2025, Christie joined League One side Bolton Wanderers on a free contract until the end of the 2025–26 season, with the option of a further year.

His contract was mutually terminated early on 28 August 2026.

=== Hanoi FC ===
On 1 September 2026, Christie joined V.League 1 club Hanoi FC.

== International career ==
Born in England, Christie was eligible to represent the Republic of Ireland through his grandmother from Dublin. In October 2014, Ireland manager Martin O'Neill asked Christie to represent the Republic of Ireland, having been impressed with his performances for Derby at the beginning of the 2014–15 season following his move from Coventry. On 10 November, Christie was called into the Ireland squad for a UEFA Euro 2016 qualifying match against Scotland, and a friendly against the United States.

On 18 November 2014, Christie made his international debut for Ireland against the United States, in a 4–1 win at the Aviva Stadium, with O'Neill praising his performance. He scored his first international goal on his next cap, a 4–0 away win over Gibraltar on 4 September 2015 which was his competitive debut in UEFA Euro 2016 qualifying. That 8 October, he played in a victory over world champions Germany in another qualifier, and was praised for his contributions.

Christie was named as part of Martin O’Neill's 23 man squad for Euro 2016. Christie remained an unused substitute for all four of Ireland's games during the tournament.

Christie scored an own goal on 14 November 2017 as the Irish lost 5–1 at home to Denmark in a 2018 FIFA World Cup qualifying play-off. He was subsequently the target of online racist abuse, which the Football Association of Ireland reported to the police.

== Career statistics ==
=== Club ===
As of 3 May 2026

Appearances and goals by club, season and competition
Club	Season	League			FA Cup		League Cup		Other		Total	
Club	Season	Division	Apps	Goals	Apps	Goals	Apps	Goals	Apps	Goals	Apps	Goals
Coventry City	2010–11	Championship	0	0	0	0	1	0	—		1	0
Coventry City	2011–12	Championship	37	0	1	0	1	0	—		39	0
Coventry City	2012–13	League One	31	2	2	1	1	0	5 (Note: Appearances in Football League Trophy)	0	39	3
Coventry City	2013–14	League One	34	1	5	0	1	0	0	0	40	1
Coventry City	Total		102	3	8	1	4	0	5	0	119	4
Nuneaton Town (loan)	2010–11	Conference North	5	0	—		—		—		5	0
Hinckley United (loan)	2010–11	Conference North	8	0	—		—		—		8	0
Derby County	2014–15	Championship	38	0	2	0	4	0	—		44	0
Derby County	2015–16	Championship	42	1	1	0	0	0	2 (Note: Appearances in the Championship play-offs)	0	45	1
Derby County	2016–17	Championship	27	1	1	0	2	0	—		30	1
Derby County	Total		107	2	4	0	6	0	2	0	119	2
Middlesbrough	2017–18	Championship	25	1	1	0	0	0	—		26	1
Fulham	2017–18	Championship	5	0	0	0	0	0	1	0	6	0
Fulham	2018–19	Premier League	23	0	0	0	3	1	—		26	1
Fulham	2019–20	Championship	24	1	2	0	1	0	3	0	30	1
Fulham	2020–21	Premier League	0	0	—		0	0	—		0	0
Fulham	2021–22	Championship	0	0	0	0	1	0	—		1	0
Fulham	Total		52	1	0	0	5	1	4	0	63	2
Nottingham Forest (loan)	2020–21	Championship	44	0	0	0	—		—		44	0
Swansea City (loan)	2021–22	Championship	23	3	—		—		—		23	3
Hull City	2022–23	Championship	28	3	0	0	0	0	—		28	3
Hull City	2023–24	Championship	28	0	0	0	1	0	—		28	0
Hull City	Total		55	3	0	0	1	0	—		56	3
Swansea City	2024–25	Championship	11	0	1	0	—		—		12	0
Bolton Wanderers	2025–26	League One	23	0	2	0	—		5 (Note: Four appearances in EFL Trophy, one appearance in League One play-offs)	0	29	0
Hà Nội	2026–27	V.League 1	0	0	0	0	—		—		0	0
Career total			455	13	19	1	16	1	16	0	496	15

=== International ===
As of match played 8 June 2022

Appearances and goals by national team and year
National team	Year	Apps	Goals
Republic of Ireland	2014	1	0
Republic of Ireland	2015	2	1
Republic of Ireland	2016	3	0
Republic of Ireland	2017	11	1
Republic of Ireland	2018	6	0
Republic of Ireland	2019	1	0
Republic of Ireland	2020	3	0
Republic of Ireland	2021	2	0
Republic of Ireland	2022	1	0
Total		30	2

Scores and results list Republic of Ireland's goal tally first, score column indicates score after each Christie goal.

List of international goals scored by Cyrus Christie
No.	Date	Venue	Opponent	Score	Result	Competition	Ref.
1	4 September 2015	Estádio Algarve, Algarve, Portugal	Gibraltar	1–0	4–0	UEFA Euro 2016 qualifying	
2	4 June 2017	Aviva Stadium, Dublin, Ireland	Uruguay	2–1	3–1	Friendly	

== Honours ==
Fulham

- EFL Championship play-offs: 2018, 2020

Bolton Wanderers

- EFL League One play-offs: 2026

== See also ==
- List of Republic of Ireland international footballers born outside the Republic of Ireland
