= Ken Dulieu =

British businessman and entrepreneur

Kenneth Paul Dulieu is a British businessman and entrepreneur known for his leadership in the security, risk management, and private intelligence sectors, as well as his involvement in professional football and hospitality ventures. He is the founding chairman of Capcon Limited and currently operates a property business and leisure complex in Portugal. Dulieu has also served as chairman of several football clubs and is actively involved in charitable work.

== Early life and career ==
Dulieu began his career in the private security and investigations sector. In 1983, he founded K & J Dulieu Limited, which traded as Capitol Consultants and later became Capitol Group plc. The business expanded rapidly to become one of the largest suppliers of security and investigatory services in the United Kingdom, employing over 3,000 people. It was listed on the London Stock Exchange in 1994, with Dulieu as chief executive.

In 1998, Capitol Group was sold to Carlisle Holdings plc. In 1999, Dulieu and his partners subsequently reacquired the Investigations and Audit & Stocktaking divisions, floating them on the Alternative Investment Market (AIM) in 2001 as Capcon Holdings plc. The business was taken private again in 2011, where Dulieu is currently Chairman of Capcon and Head of Capcon Argen. Capcon specialises in risk management and compliance solutions, offering services such as due diligence, investigations, employee screening, brand protection, and compliance audits. Capcon Argen operates globally, providing high-level intelligence, security consulting, and strategic advisory services.

== Football administration ==
=== Southampton Football Club ===
In 2006, Dulieu was appointed chairman of Southampton Leisure Holdings plc, the parent company of Southampton F.C. He was brought in to oversee the financial restructuring and turnaround of the club during a period of significant financial instability. Under his leadership, operating losses were reduced from £3.3 million to under £1 million, and the club began to challenge for promotion. Dulieu stepped down in 2007 after fulfilling an extended term and securing new investment. He was succeeded by Leon Crouch.

=== Coventry City Football Club ===
In 2010, Dulieu was appointed chairman of Coventry City F.C., where he was tasked with stabilising the club's financial situation and preparing it for the introduction of UEFA Financial Fair Play Regulations. He oversaw cost reductions, the integration of the academy and first team, and player contract renegotiations. Dulieu stepped down in December 2011 after implementing the turnaround strategy.

== Other business ventures ==
In addition to his security and football-related roles, Dulieu has pursued a range of entrepreneurial ventures:

- Capitol Inns: Dulieu began acquiring public houses in 1988, eventually owning a chain of six properties and two restaurants, which he sold in 1993 to LivingWell Health & Leisure.
- Eurosave Travel Club Ltd: Founded in 1992 to provide low-cost ferry travel packages to Europe and Scandinavia. The business ceased operations in 2002 following the abolition of duty-free sales.
- Meridien Shipping: Established in 1993 to operate a freight ferry service between Folkestone and Boulogne. The company generated over £5 million in turnover during its first year.

== Relocation to Portugal and leisure investment ==
In 1999, Dulieu relocated with his family to Portugal. He continues to operate a property development business in the region. He is also the co-owner of a leisure complex, which comprises parkland, a swimming pool, a large gym, seven padel courts, office space, and a bar/restaurant, reflecting his ongoing interest in hospitality and lifestyle ventures.

== Charitable work ==
Dulieu is a founding trustee of UK charity Kids in Sport, which later became part of Heart of Bucks, the community foundation for Buckinghamshire. He is also the Chairman of Trustees of the National Youth Harp Orchestra Charitable Trust, which supports young harpists and promotes access to music education and performance opportunities.

== Current roles ==
As of 2024, Dulieu remains chairman and Founding Partner of Capcon Limited, a private intelligence and risk consultancy firm providing global services in compliance, due diligence, and security. Alongside this, he continues to operate his property business and co-manages the leisure complex in Portugal.
