= Billy Daniels (footballer) =

English footballer (born 1994)

Personal information
- Full name: Billy Jordan Daniels
- Date of birth: 3 July 1994 (age 32)
- Place of birth: Bristol, England
- Positions: Forward; midfielder

Team information
- Current team: Hednesford Town

Youth career
- 2010–2012: Coventry City

Senior career*
Years	Team	Apps	(Gls)
2012–2015	Coventry City	24	(3)
2014	→ Cheltenham Town (loan)	2	(0)
2015	Notts County	3	(1)
2015–2018	Nuneaton Town	69	(4)
2018–2019	Kidderminster Harriers	26	(1)
2019	Nuneaton Borough	0	(0)
2019–	Hednesford Town	3	(0)
- * Club domestic league appearances and goals as of 01:45, 24 February 2020 (UTC)

Billy Jordan Daniels (born 3 July 1994) is an English professional footballer who plays for Hednesford Town. During his career, he has played as both a forward and a midfielder.

== Career ==
=== Coventry City ===
Born in Bristol, Daniels progressed through Coventry's academy to sign his first professional contract in May 2012. His professional debut for Coventry came on 14 August 2012, in a 1–0 victory over Dagenham & Redbridge in the Football League Cup.

Billy Daniels signed a contract extension in the summer of 2013. On 11 August 2013 Billy Daniels scored his first two goals in professional football in a 5–4 win for Coventry against Bristol City, including what turned out to be the winning goal. The win against Bristol City was particularly important to Daniels due to him growing up supporting their city rivals Bristol Rovers. The game was notable for being the first time Coventry played at Sixfields Stadium after their failure to agree a deal with the owners of the Ricoh Arena.

Daniels followed this brace up by scoring in Coventry's away win against Carlisle United in the following league game. However, his progress has been halted by both the return of Coventry captain Carl Baker to the right wing position that Daniels had been occupying and also a hernia problem that has limited him to sparse substitute appearance in September and October 2013. After his career Billy Daniels is now a P.E teacher.

==== Loan to Cheltenham Town ====
On 27 March 2014, Daniels joined League Two side Cheltenham Town on a 28-day loan.

=== Notts County ===
On 15 January 2015, Daniels signed for League One team Notts County for an undisclosed fee, on an 18-month contract.

=== Nuneaton Town ===
On 1 September 2015, Daniels joined National League North team Nuneaton Town

=== Kidderminster Harriers ===
On 13 July 2018, Daniels joined National League North team Kidderminster Harriers on a one-year deal.

=== Hednesford Town ===
On 5 August 2019 Hednesford Town announced the signing of Daniels from Nuneaton Borough.

== Career statistics ==
Stats according to

As of 9 September 2014

Club	Season	League			FA Cup		League Cup		Other^{[A]}		Total	
Club	Season	Division	Apps	Goals	Apps	Goals	Apps	Goals	Apps	Goals	Apps	Goals
Coventry City	2012–13	League One	4	0	0	0	1	0	1	0	6	0
Coventry City	2013–14	League One	18	3	4	0	0	0	1	0	23	3
Coventry City	2014–15	League One	2	0	0	0	1	0	1	0	4	0
Coventry City	Coventry City Total		24	3	4	0	2	0	3	0	33	3
Cheltenham Town (loan)	2013–14	League Two	2	0	0	0	0	0	0	0	2	0
Career totals			26	3	4	0	2	0	3	0	35	3

A. The "Other" column constitutes appearances and goals (including substitutes) in the Football League Trophy.
