= 2018 EFL League Two play-off final =

UK football match that determined who moved up to "League One" of English football

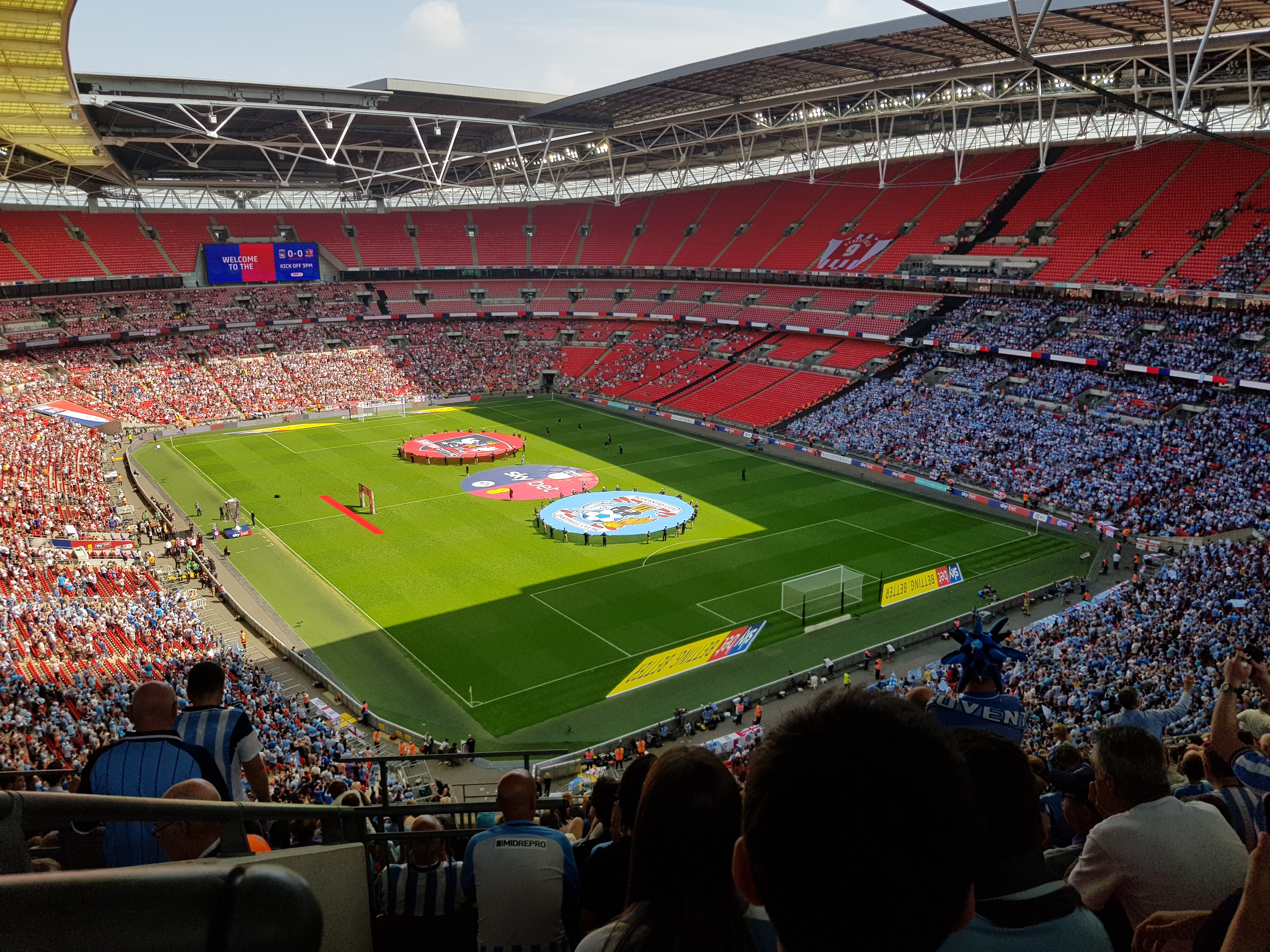
- View of Wembley Stadium prior to the final
- Event: 2017–18 EFL League Two
Coventry City	Exeter City
3	1
- Date: 28 May 2018
- Venue: Wembley Stadium, London
- Man of the Match: Marc McNulty
- Referee: David Webb
- Attendance: 50,196
- Weather: Hot, sunny, 30 °C (86 °F)

The 2018 EFL League Two play-off final was an association football match played on 28 May 2018 at Wembley Stadium, London, between Coventry City and Exeter City. The match determined the fourth and final team to gain promotion from EFL League Two, English football's fourth tier, to EFL League One. The top three teams of the 2017–18 EFL League Two season gained automatic promotion to League One, while the teams placed from fourth to seventh in the table took part in play-off semi-finals; the winners of these semi-finals competed for the final place for the 2018–19 season in League One. Exeter finished in fourth place while Coventry ended the season in sixth position. Lincoln City and Notts County were the losing semi-finalists.

The game, which was refereed by David Webb, was played on a hot sunny day in front of a crowd of 50,196. After a goalless first half, Coventry took the lead four minutes into the second half through Jordan Willis. Five minutes later they doubled their lead with a goal from Jordan Shipley. Midway through the half, Jack Grimmer made it 3–0 to Coventry. Kyle Edwards scored a consolation goal in the closing minutes of the game, but Coventry won 3–1 to earn promotion to the 2018–19 EFL League One. It was their first promotion for 51 years since being guided by Jimmy Hill into the 1967–68 Football League First Division. Marc McNulty, the Coventry striker, was named the man of the match.

Three days after the final, the Exeter City manager Paul Tisdale left the club after twelve years, having failed to agree a new contract. At the time of his departure, he was the longest serving manager in English football's top four divisions. Exeter's new manager and former player Matt Taylor led them to ninth place in the 2018–19 League Two table in their next season, two places and a single point below the play-off positions. In their following season, Coventry finished in eighth place in the 2018–19 League One table, two places and eight points outside the play-offs.

== Route to the final ==
EFL League Two final table, leading positions
Pos	Team	Pld	W	D	L	GF	GA	GD	Pts
1	Accrington Stanley	46	29	6	11	76	46	+30	93
2	Luton Town	46	25	13	8	94	46	+48	88
3	Wycombe Wanderers	46	24	12	10	79	60	+19	84
4	Exeter City	46	24	8	14	64	54	+10	80
5	Notts County	46	21	14	11	71	48	+23	77
6	Coventry City	46	22	9	15	64	47	+17	75
7	Lincoln City	46	20	15	11	64	48	+16	75

Exeter City were playing their sixth consecutive season in EFL League Two, the fourth tier of the English football league system, having been relegated from EFL League One in 2012. They had missed out on promotion the previous season, losing to Blackpool in the 2017 EFL League Two play-off final. For Coventry City it was their first season in the league's bottom tier since the 1958–59 season, following relegation from League One in 2017. They had, however, played in a Wembley final the previous season, winning the 2017 EFL Trophy Final. Exeter finished the regular 2017–18 season in fourth place in League Two, two places ahead of Coventry. Both therefore missed out on the three automatic places for promotion to League One and instead took part in the play-offs to determine the fourth promoted team. Exeter City finished four points behind Wycombe Wanderers (who were promoted in third place), eight behind Luton Town (who finished second) and thirteen behind league winners Accrington Stanley. Coventry City ended the season in sixth, two places and five points behind Exeter.

Coventry City's opponents in the play-off semi-finals were Notts County and the first leg was played on 12 May 2018 at the Ricoh Arena in Coventry. Described by the BBC's Ged Scott as an "exciting tussle, which produced an ultimately fair result", the match ended 1–1. After a goalless first half, Jonathan Forte put the visitors into the lead on 49 minutes. With three minutes of the match remaining, Matt Tootle was adjudged to have fouled Tom Bayliss and Marc McNulty scored the resulting penalty to level the tie. The second semi-final leg took place six days later at Meadow Lane in Nottingham. Coventry dominated the first half with Maxime Biamou opening the scoring with a bicycle kick on six minutes. McNulty then doubled the visitors' lead eight minutes before the break, before Jorge Grant pulled one back for Notts County a minute before half time. Biamou scored his second and Coventry's third mid-way through the second half, and a deflected shot from Bayliss made it 4–1 to Coventry. This meant they progressed to the play-off final, winning 5–2 on aggregate.

Exeter City faced Lincoln City in their play-off semi-final, with the first leg taking place on 12 May 2018 at Sincil Bank in Lincoln. The home team saw two claims for penalties denied and both sides spurned opportunities to score as the game finished goalless. The second leg of the semi-final was played five days later at St James Park in Exeter. Jayden Stockley put the home team ahead mid-way through the first half and Lincoln's Elliott Whitehouse had a goal disallowed five minutes before half time. Hiram Boateng made it 2–0 to Exeter after curling a shot in off the post following a run from inside his own half. Ryan Harley's 25-yard (23 m) strike extended Exeter's lead, and with a consolation goal from Matt Green, the match ended 3–1 and Exeter progressed to the final.

== Match ==
=== Background ===
In the matches played between the two sides during the regular season, each team won their home game, with Coventry winning 2–1 at the Ricoh Arena in September 2017 and Exeter victorious at St James Park 1–0 the following January. McNulty was the highest scorer for Coventry with 23 league goals during the season while Stockley was Exeter's top marksman with 19 goals during the league campaign.

Exeter City manager Paul Tisdale was confident in his team's chances of victory, reflecting on their previous season's failure at Wembley, suggesting that his players had "experience of the build-up, the logistics, the preparations and what it felt like to lose". His counterpart Mark Robins was cautious, noting that Coventry were "one step away but you don't want to tempt fate". During the build-up to the final, Tisdale was linked to a move away from Exeter, in particular to Milton Keynes Dons. He was the longest-serving manager in England's top four divisions following the retirement of Arsène Wenger, having been at Exeter for twelve years. Tisdale's contract was due for renewal in November 2018 and Richard Foster of The Guardian reported that Tisdale was "keeping his options open" in order to make a decision after the play-offs. Steve Perryman, Exeter's director of football was to retire after the final having fulfilled the role at the club for fifteen years. Coventry City sold around 37,000 tickets for the match, substantially outnumbering the opposition fans.

The referee for the match was David Webb, who had officiated Coventry once during the regular season, a 2–1 home win over Cheltenham Town in December. He had also officiated Exeter City in the previous year's play-off semi-final at Carlisle United. The assistant referees were Adrian Waters and Dean Treleaven, with John Brooks named as the fourth official. Sam Lewis was the reserve assistant referee.

Robins named an unchanged side from the team that won the second leg of the play-off semi-final against Notts County. Tisdale made one change to the Exeter squad, with Craig Woodman starting and Robbie Simpson dropping into the substitutes. Coventry wore a one-off kit commissioned for the match as the club had run out of their regular season home strip. Prior to the match, Exeter fans commemorated their former player Adam Stansfield with a giant number nine shirt. Stansfield had died in 2010 at the age of 31 from cancer and the club retired his shirt for the following nine years. After the players were introduced to a group of dignitaries, the national anthem was sung by Faryl Smith.

=== First half ===
Coventry City kicked the match off at around 3:00 p.m. on 28 May 2018 in hot and sunny conditions, with a pitchside temperature of 30 °C (86 °F), in front of a Wembley Stadium crowd of 50,196. McNulty won an early corner for Coventry but Exeter cleared the ball. In the sixth minute, McNulty attempted a volley from outside the Exeter penalty area, but his shot went over the crossbar. Nine minutes later, Coventry had another chance but Jordan Storey's tackle on McNulty neutralised the threat. On 18 minutes Christy Pym saved a low 25-yard (23 m) shot from McNulty before a Shipley strike was deflected out for a corner. In the 23rd minute, a cross from Jack Grimmer was mishit by Bayliss, going out for an Exeter goal kick. Two minutes later, Coventry were temporarily reduced to ten men when Chris Stokes was forced to leave the pitch for medical attention after he was accidentally struck in the face by Stockley. Exeter won a corner on 29 minutes but Stockley's header was gathered by the Coventry goalkeeper Lee Burge. On 31 minutes, Harley's strike was also caught by Burge, before Shipley's long-distance shot was saved by Pym. After three minutes of additional time, the half was brought to a goalless end.

=== Second half ===
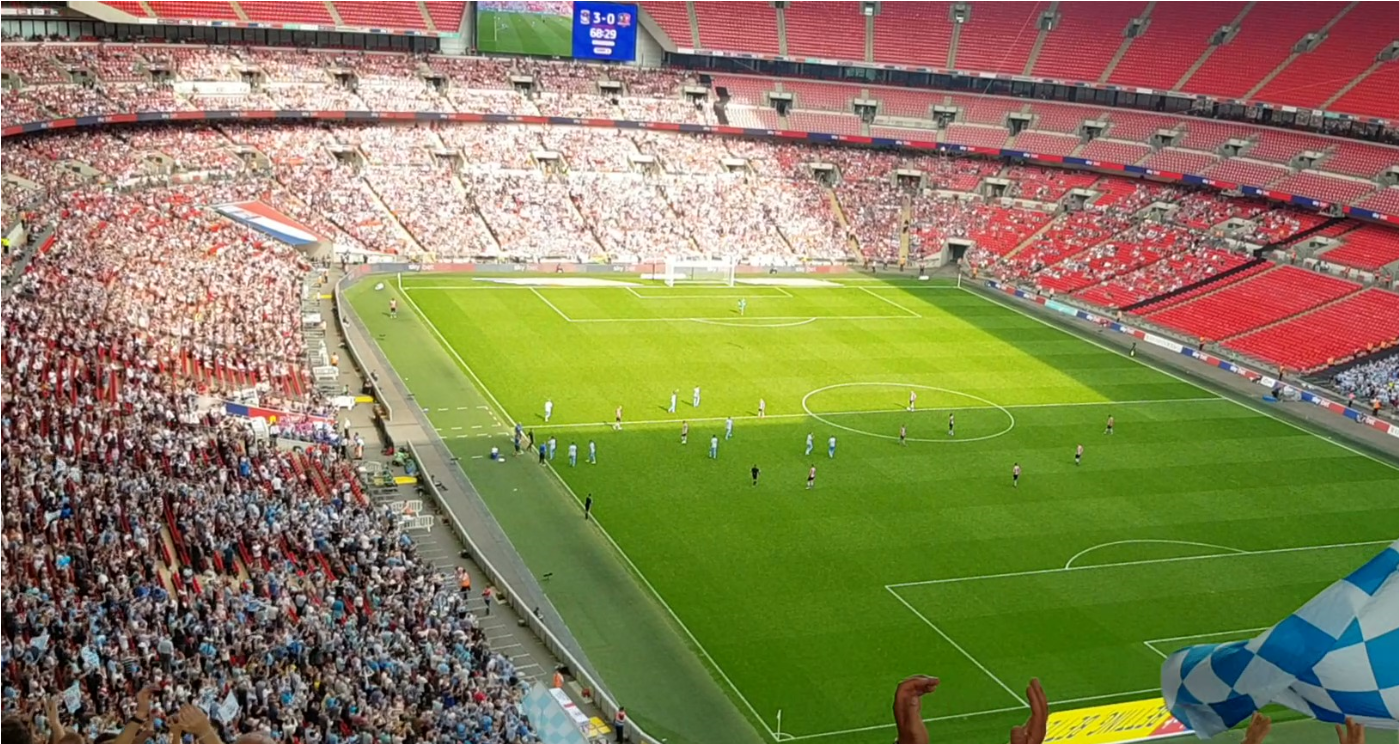
Coventry City players celebrate after scoring their third goal

No changes were made to either team during half time and Exeter kicked off the second half. Two minutes in, a pass from Bayliss found McNulty whose shot from close range was saved by Pym. A minute later, the deadlock was broken as Coventry took a 1–0 lead through Jordan Willis who turned and shot from outside the box, his strike curling past Pym. Three minutes later, Coventry made their first substitution of the afternoon with Biamou being replaced by Jonson Clarke-Harris. On 53 minutes, they doubled their lead as a deflected shot from Shipley beat Pym in the Exeter goal. Two consecutive corners for Exeter came to nothing while a 40-yard (37 m) strike from Shipley went wide. In the 62nd minute, Exeter made a double substitution, with Woodman and Dean Moxey being replaced by Lloyd James and Matt Jay. On 68 minutes, Grimmer made it 3–0 to Coventry with a curling shot from the edge of the area. Six minutes later, both sides made further substitutions, Shipley replaced by Kyel Reid for Coventry and Kyle Edwards coming on for Boateng for Exeter. In the 75th minute, Exeter went close with Harley's dipping shot saved by Burge. With twelve minutes of regulation time remaining, Pym was forced to make a save from a curling Bayliss shot before Jay's long-range strike for Exeter was gathered by Burge. In the 83rd minute, Coventry made their final change, with Jordan Ponticelli coming on for McNulty. Five minutes later Clarke-Harris' shot from distance went astray before Edwards scored a consolation goal for Exeter with another curled strike. Four minutes into additional time, Stockley's header was saved by Burge before another shot from the Exeter striker went wide of the Coventry post. The match ended 3–1 to Coventry who were promoted to League One.

=== Details ===
28 May 2018
15:00 BST

Coventry City	3–1	Exeter City
Willis 49'; Shipley 54'; Grimmer 68'		Edwards 89'

Wembley Stadium, London
Attendance: 50,196
Referee: David Webb

Coventry City	Exeter City

GK	1	Lee Burge
RB	2	Jack Grimmer
CB	4	Jordan Willis
CB	15	Dominic Hyam
LB	3	Chris Stokes
RM	30	Tom Bayliss
CM	6	Liam Kelly
CM	8	Michael Doyle (c)
LM	26	Jordan Shipley	(substituted off) 73'
CF	10	Marc McNulty	(substituted off) 82'
CF	9	Maxime Biamou	(substituted off) 51'
Substitutes:
GK	13	Liam O'Brien
DF	5	Rod McDonald
DF	39	Jordon Thompson
MF	17	Jordan Maguire-Drew
MF	32	Kyel Reid	(substituted on) 73'
FW	18	Jonson Clarke-Harris	(substituted on) 51'
FW	38	Jordan Ponticelli	(substituted on) 82'
Manager:
Mark Robins

GK	1	Christy Pym
RB	2	Pierce Sweeney
CB	38	Jordan Storey
CB	15	Jordan Moore-Taylor (c)
LB	3	Craig Woodman	(substituted off) 63'
RM	25	Jake Taylor
CM	44	Hiram Boateng	(substituted off) 73'
CM	6	Jordan Tillson
CM	21	Dean Moxey	(substituted off) 63'
LM	7	Ryan Harley
CF	11	Jayden Stockley
Substitutes:
GK	12	Paul Jones
DF	5	Troy Archibald-Henville
DF	22	Kane Wilson
MF	4	Lloyd James	(substituted on) 63'
FW	8	Robbie Simpson
FW	20	Matt Jay	(substituted on) 63'
FW	28	Kyle Edwards	(substituted on) 73'
Manager:
Paul Tisdale

=== Statistics ===
Statistics
	Coventry City	Exeter City
Total shots	14	13
Shots on target	8	3
Corner kicks	5	4
Fouls committed	6	5
Possession	44%	56%
Yellow cards	0	0
Red cards	0	0

== Post-match ==
Robins was proud of his team's achievements: "We've played at a level no one expected us to and the pressure that comes with that is immense. The players have been magnificent." His counterpart, Tisdale, said in his post-match press conference that "it wasn't the best performance, two very good goals against us and really disappointed" but also expressed pride in the club and its players for the season as a whole. The Coventry defender Willis said "It means everything, especially with the season we had last year ... I've not scored many and they all came last season but this one is definitely up there."

It was Coventry City's first promotion for 51 years since they were guided into the 1967–68 Football League First Division by Jimmy Hill, and the team celebrated the achievement with their fans through an open-top bus tour of Coventry on 31 May, followed by a civic reception hosted by the Lord Mayor. Two seasons later Coventry were promoted again, to the EFL Championship, being named 2019–20 EFL League One champions after the season was abandoned due to the COVID-19 pandemic.

On 1 June 2018, following a failure to agree a new contract, Tisdale left Exeter City after twelve years at the club. At the time of his departure, he was the longest serving manager in English football's top four divisions. He was replaced by the former Exeter City player Matt Taylor, who led them to ninth place in the 2018–19 League Two table in their next season, two places and a single point below the play-off positions. They reached the League Two play-off final again in the curtailed 2019–20 season but lost once again, 4–0 against Northampton Town, their third defeat in the event in four seasons. In their following campaign, Coventry finished in eighth place in the 2018–19 League One season, two places and eight points outside the play-offs.
