= 2017–18 Coventry City F.C. season =

Coventry City
2017–18 season
- Chairman: Tim Fisher
- Manager: Mark Robins
- Stadium: Ricoh Arena
- League Two: 6th (promoted via play-offs)
- FA Cup: Fifth round vs Brighton & Hove Albion
- EFL Cup: First round vs Blackburn Rovers
- EFL Trophy: Group stage
- Top goalscorer: League: Marc McNulty (25); All: Marc McNulty (28)
- Highest home attendance: 28,343 vs Accrington Stanley (10 February 2018)
- Lowest home attendance: 6,151 vs Carlisle United (12 September 2017)
- Average home league attendance: 9,255
- Biggest win: 6–1 vs Cheltenham Town (28 April 2018)
- Biggest defeat: 6–2 vs Yeovil Town (2 April 2018)
Home colours	Away colours

The 2017–18 season was Coventry City's 134th season in their existence and their first in the English fourth tier for 59 years, League Two, following relegation the previous season. Along with competing in League Two, the club participated in three cup competitions: FA Cup, EFL Cup and EFL Trophy.

The season covers the period between 1 July 2017 and 30 June 2018.

Coventry's 6th place league finish, despite being the lowest in their history, was their highest in any division since the 1969–70 season.

== Review and events ==
=== July ===
Nathan Clarke, Kevin Foley, Andy Rose, Rúben Lameiras, Vladimir Gadzhev, Jack Finch, Kyle Spence, Marcus Tudgay and Jacob Whitmore are all released following the end of their contracts.

== Competitions ==
=== Preseason friendlies ===
As of 27 June 2017, Coventry City have announced seven pre-season friendlies against Liverpool XI, Nuneaton Town, Sutton United, Barnsley, Mickleover Sports, Milton Keynes Dons, Valenciennes and Leamington.

8 July 2017	Sutton United	0–1	Coventry City	London Borough of Sutton
15:00 BST		Report	Moorhouse 86'	Stadium: Gander Green Lane; Attendance: 1,076

11 July 2017	Valenciennes (France)	3–2	Coventry City	Murcia, Spain
19:00 CEST	Ambri 6'; Hyam 70' (o.g.); Nestor 82'	Report	McNulty 40' (pen.); Ponticelli 65'	Stadium: Pinatar Arena

18 July 2017	Barnsley	3–1	Coventry City	Barnsley
19:45 BST	Mallan 24'; Payne 40'; Bradshaw 67'	Report	Beavon 54'	Stadium: Oakwell

21 July 2017	Coventry City	2–0	Milton Keynes Dons	Nuneaton
19:00 BST	McNulty 15' (pen.), 58' (pen.)	Report		Stadium: Liberty Way; Attendance: 983

25 July 2017	Mickleover Sports	0–1	Coventry City	Mickleover
19:30 BST		Report	Ponticelli 63'	Stadium: Don Amott Arena

29 July 2017	Coventry City	0–0	Liverpool XI	Nuneaton
14:00 BST		Report		Stadium: Liberty Way

30 July 2017	Nuneaton Town	1–2	Coventry City	Nuneaton
17:55 BST	Beswick 76'	Report	Beavon 19'; Jones 82'	Stadium: Liberty Way

2 August 2017	Leamington	Cancelled	Coventry City	Leamington
19:45 BST		Report		Stadium: New Windmill Ground

=== League Two ===
==== League table ====
Pos	Team	Pld	W	D	L	GF	GA	GD	Pts	Promotion, qualification or relegation
4	Exeter City	46	24	8	14	64	54	+10	80	Qualification for League Two play-offs (Note: Four teams play for one spot and promotion to EFL League One.)
5	Notts County	46	21	14	11	71	48	+23	77	Qualification for League Two play-offs
6	Coventry City (O, P)	46	22	9	15	64	47	+17	75	Qualification for League Two play-offs
7	Lincoln City	46	20	15	11	64	48	+16	75	Qualification for League Two play-offs
8	Mansfield Town	46	18	18	10	67	52	+15	72	

Source: BBC Sport
Rules for classification: 1) Points; 2) Goal difference; 3) Number of goals scored
(O) Play-off winners; (P) Promoted

==== Results summary ====
Overall								Home						Away					
Pld	W	D	L	GF	GA	GD	Pts	W	D	L	GF	GA	GD	W	D	L	GF	GA	GD
46	22	9	15	64	47	+17	75	13	4	6	36	24	+12	9	5	9	28	23	+5

Last updated: 5 May 2018.

==== Results by matchday ====
Matchday	1	2	3	4	5	6	7	8	9	10	11	12	13	14	15	16	17	18	19	20	21	22	23	24	25	26	27	28	29	30	31	32	33	34	35	36	37	38	39	40	41	42	43	44	45	46
Ground	H	A	H	A	A	H	H	A	H	A	H	A	A	H	H	A	H	A	A	H	A	H	H	A	A	H	A	H	H	A	H	A	A	A	H	H	A	H	A	H	A	A	H	H	A	H
Result	W	W	L	L	D	W	W	L	W	W	W	D	L	L	D	W	L	W	D	D	L	W	W	L	W	W	L	W	W	L	L	L	D	W	W	D	W	W	D	L	L	W	W	L	W	D
Position	2	1	4	10	10	8	4	6	6	4	4	5	7	8	8	6	6	7	6	6	7	7	4	7	5	3	8	6	4	8	9	9	9	8	8	7	6	6	6	7	7	6	6	7	6	6

Updated to match(es) played on 5 May 2018. Source:
A = Away; H = Home; W = Win; D = Draw; L = Loss

==== Matches ====
On 21 June 2017, the league fixtures were announced.

5 August 2017 1	Coventry City	3–0	Notts County	Coventry
15:00 BST	Jones 29', 80', 90+5'	Report		Stadium: Ricoh Arena; Attendance: 10,350

12 August 2017 2	Grimsby Town	0–2	Coventry City	Cleethorpes
15:00 BST		Report	McNulty 62'; Grimmer 76'	Stadium: Blundell Park; Attendance: 6,767; Referee: Barrett

19 August 2017 3	Coventry City	0–1	Newport County	Coventry
15:00 BST		Report	Cole 53'; Reynolds (yellow card) 90'; White (yellow card) 90+1'	Stadium: Ricoh Arena; Attendance: 8,745; Referee: Paul Tierney

26 August 2017 4	Yeovil Town	2–0	Coventry City	Yeovil
15:00 BST	Olomola (yellow card) 15' (goal) 75'; Browne 27'; Smith (yellow card) 56'; Mugabi (yellow card) 90+1'	Report		Stadium: Huish Park; Attendance: 3,754; Referee: Martin Coy

2 September 2017 5	Chesterfield	0–0	Coventry City	Chesterfield
15:00 BST	Weir (yellow card) 49' (yellow-red card) 60'; Flores (yellow card) 58'; Jules (yellow card) 87'	Report	Grimmer (yellow card) 33'	Stadium: Proact Stadium; Attendance: 5,164; Referee: Darren Drysdale

9 September 2017 6	Coventry City	1–0	Port Vale	Coventry
15:00 BST	Jones 24'; McDonald (red card) 81'; Vincenti (yellow card) 84'	Report	Middleton (yellow card) 71'	Stadium: Ricoh Arena; Attendance: 6,951; Referee: Brett Huxtable

12 September 2017 7	Coventry City	2–0	Carlisle United	Coventry
19:45 BST	Nazon 48'; Vincenti (yellow card) 56' (goal) 80'	Report	Grainger (yellow card) 57'; Joyce (yellow card) 72'; Hope (yellow card) 84'	Stadium: Ricoh Arena; Attendance: 6,151; Referee: Trevor Kettle

16 September 2017 8	Cambridge United	2–1	Coventry City	Cambridge
15:00 BST	Ibehre 10'; Taylor (yellow card) 70'; Ikpeazu 76'; Maris (yellow card) 82'	Report	Vincenti (yellow card) 33'; Kelly (yellow card) 36'; Nazon 54' (yellow card) 71'	Stadium: Abbey Stadium; Attendance: 5,142; Referee: Mark Heywood

23 September 2017 9	Coventry City	2–0	Exeter City	Coventry
15:00 BST	Brown 58' (o.g.); Doyle (yellow card) 77'; Kelly-Evans 90+1'	Report	Tillson (yellow card) 57'; Boateng (yellow card) 74'	Stadium: Ricoh Arena; Attendance: 8,340; Referee: Robert Jones

26 September 2017 10	Swindon Town	1–2	Coventry City	Swindon
19:45 BST	Norris 20' (yellow card) 50'; Dunne (red card) 72'; Anderson (yellow card) 90+1'	Report	Doyle 32' (yellow card) 73'; McDonald (yellow card) 74'; Nazon 76'; Kelly-Evans (yellow card) 78'	Stadium: County Ground; Attendance: 6,340; Referee: Charles Breakspear

30 September 2017 11	Coventry City	1–0	Crewe Alexandra	Coventry
15:00 BST	Nazon 9'; Jones (yellow card) 87'	Report	Lowery (yellow card) 46'	Stadium: Ricoh Arena; Attendance: 7,664; Referee: Dean Whitestone

7 October 2017 12	Barnet	0–0	Coventry City	Canons Park
12:30 BST		Report	McDonald (yellow card) 90'	Stadium: The Hive Stadium; Attendance: Ben Toner; Referee: 4,041

14 October 2017 13	Accrington Stanley	1–0	Coventry City	Accrington
15:00 BST	McConville 14'; Richards-Everton (yellow card) 64'; Thorniley (yellow card) 89'; Donacien (yellow card) 89'	Report	Stevenson (yellow card) 27'; Grimmer (yellow card) 90'	Stadium: Wham Stadium; Attendance: 2,828; Referee: Seb Stockbridge

17 October 2017 14	Coventry City	0–1	Forest Green Rovers	Coventry
19:45 BST	McDonald (yellow card) 23'; Doyle (yellow card) 45+1'; Nazon (yellow card) 79'; McNulty (yellow card) 90+1'	Report	Marsh-Brown 29'; Brown (yellow card) 90+2'	Stadium: Ricoh Arena; Attendance: 6,366; Referee: Simon Hooper

21 October 2017 15	Coventry City	0–0	Colchester United	Coventry
15:00 BST	Nazon (yellow card) 65'; Doyle (yellow card) 68'	Report	Inniss (yellow card) 65'; Lapslie (yellow card) 75' (yellow-red card) 76'; Walker (yellow card) 77'	Stadium: Ricoh Arena; Attendance: 7,149; Referee: Michael Salisbury

28 October 2017 16	Luton Town	0–3	Coventry City	Luton
15:00 BST	Hylton (yellow card) 6'; Lee (yellow card) 41'; Rea (red card) 90+1'; Cuthbert (yellow card) 90+9'	Report	McNulty 17' (yellow card) 90+4'; Shipley 90+2'; Nazon 90+6'	Stadium: Kenilworth Road; Attendance: 9,670; Referee: Robert Jones

11 November 2017 17	Coventry City	0–1	Mansfield Town	Coventry
15:00 GMT	McDonald (yellow card) 31'; Grimmer (yellow card) 49'; Jones (yellow card) 80'	Report	White (yellow card) 42'; Rose (yellow card) 65'; MacDonald 84'; Hemmings (yellow card) 90+4'	Stadium: Ricoh Arena; Attendance: 8,410; Referee: Nick Kinseley

18 November 2017 18	Lincoln City	1–2	Coventry City	Lincoln
15:00 GMT	Long (yellow card) 20'; Rhead 28'; Dickie (yellow card) 52'; Green (yellow card) 66'; Palmer (yellow card) 90+7'	Report	Jones 61'; Nazon 70' (yellow card) 71'	Stadium: Sincil Bank; Attendance: 9,581; Referee: Ross Joyce

21 November 2017 19	Stevenage	1–1	Coventry City	Stevenage
19:45 GMT	Pett 76'	Report	McNulty 22'; Shipley (yellow card) 31'	Stadium: Broadhall Way; Attendance: 2,544; Referee: Kevin Johnson

25 November 2017 20	Coventry City	1–1	Crawley Town	Coventry
15:00 GMT	Davies (yellow card) 30'; Haynes (yellow card) 60'; McNulty 74'; McDonald (yellow card) 90+4'	Report	Randall (yellow card) 3'; Roberts 42'	Stadium: Ricoh Arena; Attendance: 6,381; Referee: Craig Hicks

9 December 2017 21	Morecambe	2–0	Coventry City	Morecambe
15:00 GMT	McGurk (yellow card) 10'; Oliver 36'; Lang 69'; Fleming (yellow card) 72'; Rose (yellow card) 84'	Report		Stadium: Globe Arena; Attendance: 1,773; Referee: Robert Lewis

16 December 2017 22	Coventry City	2–1	Cheltenham Town	Coventry
15:00 GMT	Bayliss 2' (yellow card) 42'; McNulty 75'	Report	Eisa 34'; Pell (yellow card) 60'; O'Shaughnessy (yellow card) 79'; Storer (yellow card) 89'	Stadium: Ricoh Arena; Attendance: 6,457; Referee: David Webb

22 December 2017 23	Coventry City	3–2	Wycombe Wanderers	Coventry
19:45 GMT	Doyle 14'; Bayliss (yellow card) 34'; McNulty 41', 55' (pen.) (yellow card) 86'; Shipley (yellow card) 83'	Report	Tyson (yellow card) 12'; Scarr 45+5' (yellow card) 54'; Akinfenwa (yellow card) 46'; Jacobson 49' (pen.) (yellow card) 90+2'; O'Nien (yellow card) 52'	Stadium: Ricoh Arena; Attendance: 7,234; Referee: Tony Harrington

26 December 2017 24	Port Vale	1–0	Coventry City	Burslem
15:00 GMT	Tonge (yellow card) 28'; Kay (yellow card) 71'; Smith 79'; Gunning (yellow card) 90+2'; Davis (yellow card) 90+2'	Report	McDonald (yellow card) 36'; Davies (yellow card) 50'; Doyle (yellow card) 62'	Stadium: Vale Park; Attendance: 7,127; Referee: John Brooks

30 December 2017 25	Carlisle United	0–1	Coventry City	Carlisle
15:00 GMT	Grainger (yellow card) 67'; Devitt (yellow card) 85'	Report	McNulty 50'; Davies (yellow card) 80'; Biamou (yellow card) 85'	Stadium: Brunton Park; Attendance: 5,807; Referee: Scott Oldham

1 January 2018 26	Coventry City	1–0	Chesterfield	Coventry
15:00 GMT	McNulty 14'; Bayliss (yellow card) 61'	Report	Dennis (yellow card) 45+4'; Wiseman (yellow card) 61' (yellow-red card) 80'	Stadium: Ricoh Arena; Attendance: 7,402; Referee: Trevor Kettle

6 January 2018 P	Coventry City	v	Cambridge United	Coventry
15:00 GMT				Stadium: Ricoh Arena
Note: On 14 December, it was announced that the home fixture against Cambridge United was rearranged due to the club's FA Cup involvement.

13 January 2018 27	Exeter City	1–0	Coventry City	Exeter
15:00 GMT	Harley 7'; James (yellow card) 81'	Report	Stokes (yellow card) 45'	Stadium: St James Park; Attendance: 4,219; Referee: Ben Toner

20 January 2018 28	Coventry City	3–1	Swindon Town	Coventry
15:00 GMT	Davies (yellow card) 16'; Biamou 17'; McNulty 22' (pen.), 81'; Doyle (yellow card) 69'; Grimmer (yellow card) 77'	Report	Gordon (yellow card) 36'; Banks 39'	Stadium: Ricoh Arena; Attendance: 8,643; Referee: Steve Martin

27 January 2018 P	Wycombe Wanderers	v	Coventry City	High Wycombe
15:00 GMT				Stadium: Adams Park
Note: On 8 January, it was announced that the away fixture against Wycombe Wanderers was to be re-arranged due to the club's FA Cup involvement.

30 January 2018 29	Coventry City	3–1	Cambridge United	Coventry
19:45 GMT	McNulty 10' (yellow card) 81'; Shipley 30'; McDonald (yellow card) 38'; Stokes (yellow card) 87'; Doyle 90+2'	Report	Taft 84'	Stadium: Ricoh Arena; Attendance: 6,897; Referee: Tom Nield

3 February 2018 30	Forest Green Rovers	2–1	Coventry City	Nailsworth
15:00 GMT	Bray 39'; L. Collins 64'	Report	Kelly (yellow card) 38'; McNulty 59' (pen.)	Stadium: The New Lawn; Attendance: 3,623; Referee: Darren Handley

10 February 2018 31	Coventry City	0–2	Accrington Stanley	Coventry
15:00 GMT	Di. Kelly-Evans (yellow card) 65'	Report	Clark 5', 60'; Kee (yellow card) 47'; Conneely (yellow card) 84'	Stadium: Ricoh Arena; Attendance: 28,343; Referee: Dean Whitestone

13 February 2018 32	Colchester United	2–1	Coventry City	Colchester
19:45 GMT	Ogedi-Uzokwe 27' (pen.); Mandron 88'	Report	Bayliss 56'	Stadium: Colchester Community Stadium; Attendance: 3,319; Referee: John Busby

17 February 2018 P	Coventry City	v	Luton Town	Coventry
15:00 GMT				Stadium: Ricoh Arena
Note: Rearranged due to the club's FA Cup involvement.

24 February 2018 33	Mansfield Town	1–1	Coventry City	Mansfield
15:00 GMT	Hemmings 16'; King (yellow card) 49'; Logan (yellow card) 71'; Miller (yellow card) 87'	Report	Willis (red card) 15'; Doyle (yellow card) 19'; Clarke-Harris (pen.), 71'; Shipley (yellow card) 83'	Stadium: Field Mill; Attendance: 6,105; Referee: Michael Salisbury

27 February 2018 34	Wycombe Wanderers	0–1	Coventry City	High Wycombe
19:45 GMT	Cowan-Hall (yellow card) 50'; Bloomfield (yellow card) 90'	Report	Reid (yellow card) 80'; McNulty 82' (pen.) (yellow card) 83'	Stadium: Adams Park; Attendance: 4,087; Referee: Brendan Malone

3 March 2018 P	Coventry City	v	Lincoln City	Coventry
15:00 GMT				Stadium: Ricoh Arena; Referee: Michael Dean

10 March 2018 35	Coventry City	1–0	Barnet	Coventry
15:00 GMT	Clarke-Harris 75', (yellow card) 76'	Report	Weston (yellow card) 26'	Stadium: Ricoh Arena; Attendance: 7,127; Referee: Gavin Ward

13 March 2018 36	Coventry City	2–2	Luton Town	Coventry
19:45 GMT	Vincenti 3'; McNulty 45'; Kelly (yellow card) 78'	Report	Cuthbert 55'; Rea (yellow card) 63'; Collins 88'	Stadium: Ricoh Arena; Attendance: 8,863; Referee: Charles Breakspear

17 March 2018 37	Crewe Alexandra	1–2	Coventry City	Crewe
15:00 GMT	Bowery 33'; Ray (yellow card) 37'; Nolan (yellow card) 75'	Report	Clarke-Harris 5'; Bayliss 43'	Stadium: Gresty Road; Attendance: 4,666; Referee: Antony Coggins

24 March 2018 38	Coventry City	4–0	Grimsby Town	Coventry
15:00 GMT	Vincenti 38'; McNulty 55', 76', 87'	Report		Stadium: Ricoh Arena; Attendance: 8,755; Referee: Ollie Yates

30 March 2018 39	Newport County	1–1	Coventry City	Newport
15:00 BST (UTC+1)	Demetriou 40'; O'Brien (yellow card) 82'	Report	Haynes (yellow card) 73'; Biamou 79'	Stadium: Rodney Parade; Attendance: 4,667; Referee: Dean Whitestone

2 April 2018 40	Coventry City	2–6	Yeovil Town	Coventry
15:00 BST (UTC+1)	Biamou 47', 68'	Report	Fisher 6', 15'; Zoko 11', 55'; Surridge 80', 90'; Green (yellow card) 62'	Stadium: Ricoh Arena; Attendance: 8,787; Referee: Eddie Ilderton

7 April 2018 41	Notts County	2–1	Coventry City	Nottingham
15:00 BST (UTC+1)	Noble (yellow card) 50'; Ameobi (yellow card) 52'; Forte 60', 86'	Report	Biamou (yellow card) 45'; McDonald (yellow card) 52'; Bayliss (yellow card) 57'; Burge (yellow card) 60'; Ponticelli 85'	Stadium: Meadow Lane; Attendance: 10,316; Referee: Ross Joyce

14 April 2018 42	Crawley Town	1–2	Coventry City	Crawley
15:00 BST (UTC+1)	Young 13'; Tajbakhsh (yellow card) 29'	Report	Ponticelli 5', 77'; Doyle (yellow card) 64'	Stadium: Broadfield Stadium; Attendance: 3,294; Referee: Lee Swabey

20 April 2018 43	Coventry City	3–1	Stevenage	Coventry
19:45 BST (UTC+1)	McNulty 2', 6'; Doyle (yellow card) 21'; Kelly 37'	Report	Revell 20'; Amos (yellow card) 25'; Wilkinson (red card) 40'; Martin (yellow card) 84'	Stadium: Ricoh Arena; Attendance: 8,859; Referee: Michael Salisbury

24 April 2018 44	Coventry City	2–4	Lincoln City	Coventry
19:45 BST (UTC+1)	Bayliss 16'; Shipley 39'; Clarke-Harris (yellow card) 42'	Report	Rhead 1'; Palmer 38', 44', (yellow card) 85'; Green (yellow card) 63'; Frecklington 67'; Wilson (yellow card) 79'; Whitehouse (yellow card) 90+1'; Allsop (yellow card) 90+1'; Williams (yellow card) 90+3'	Stadium: Ricoh Arena; Attendance: 13,115; Referee: Mike Jones

28 April 2018 45	Cheltenham Town	1–6	Coventry City	Cheltenham
15:00 BST (UTC+1)	Chatzitheodoridis (yellow card) 29'; Eisa 58'; Pell (yellow card) 61'	Report	Bayliss 12'; McNulty 27', 43', 78'; Shipley 28'; Burge (yellow card) 57'; Doyle (yellow card) 58'; Biamou 74', (yellow card) 74'; Stokes (yellow card) 82'	Stadium: Whaddon Road; Attendance: 5,027; Referee: Antony Coggins

5 May 2018 46	Coventry City	0–0	Morecambe	Coventry
15:00 BST (UTC+1)	Grimmer (yellow card) 40'	Report		Stadium: Ricoh Arena; Attendance: 15,874; Referee: Andy Davies

==== Football League play-offs ====
12 May 2018 Semi final (1st leg)	Coventry City	1–1	Notts County	Coventry
19:30 BST	Stokes (yellow card) 26'; Doyle (yellow card) 28'; Hyam (yellow card) 75'; McNulty 87' (pen.)	Report	Forte 49'; Grant (yellow card) 74'; Duffy (yellow card) 86'; O'Connor (yellow card) 89'	Stadium: Ricoh Arena; Attendance: 17,404; Referee: Gavin Ward

18 May 2018 Semi final (2nd leg)	Notts County	1–4 (2–5 agg.)	Coventry City	Nottingham
19:45 BST	Tootle (yellow card) 16'; Alessandra (yellow card) 30'; Grant 44'; Brisley (yellow card) 45+4'	Report	Biamou 6', 71'; Doyle (yellow card) 24'; McNulty 37', (yellow card) 45+5'; Bayliss 86'	Stadium: Meadow Lane; Attendance: 17,615; Referee: Darren Drysdale

28 May 2018 Final	Coventry City	3–1	Exeter City	London
15:00 BST	Willis 49'; Shipley 54'; Grimmer 68'	Report	Edwards 89'	Stadium: Wembley Stadium; Attendance: 50,196; Referee: David Webb

=== FA Cup ===
On 16 October 2017, Coventry City were drawn at home to Maidenhead United in the first round. Another home tie for the second round was confirmed with Boreham Wood the visiting side. A third home tie was drawn for the third round, with Premier League side Stoke City the visitors.

Maxime Biamou scored the only goal of the game as Coventry beat Milton Keynes Dons away in the fourth round. Coventry took 7,833 supporters to the game, outnumbering the home fans.

5 November 2017 First round	Coventry City	2–0	Maidenhead United	Coventry
14:00 GMT	Ponticelli 33', 44'; Vincenti (yellow card) 45+3'	Report	Barratt (yellow card) 19'	Stadium: Ricoh Arena; Attendance: 3,370; Referee: Scott Duncan

3 December 2017 Second round	Coventry City	3–0	Boreham Wood	Coventry
14:00 GMT	Nazon (yellow card) 4' (goal) 27'; Doyle (yellow card) 22'; McNulty 40'; Shipley 48'	Report	Champion (yellow card) 25'; Stephens (yellow card) 44'; Murtagh (yellow card) 90+4'	Stadium: Ricoh Arena; Attendance: 2,985; Referee: Darren Handley

6 January 2018 Third round	Coventry City	2–1	Stoke City	Coventry
15:00 GMT	Willis 24'; Grimmer 68'	Report	Ireland (yellow card) 26'; Allen (yellow card) 35'; Adam 54' (pen.)	Stadium: Ricoh Arena; Attendance: 14,199; Referee: Martin Atkinson

27 January 2018 Fourth round	Milton Keynes Dons	0–1	Coventry City	Milton Keynes
15:00 GMT	Ebanks-Landell (yellow card) 72'; Tavernier (yellow card) 87'	Report	Biamou 64'; Doyle (yellow card) 5'; McDonald (yellow card) 65'	Stadium: Stadium mk Attendance: 14,925; Referee: Peter Bankes

17 February 2018 Fifth round	Brighton & Hove Albion	3–1	Coventry City	Brighton and Hove
15:00 GMT	Locadia 15'; Goldson 34'; Ulloa 61'	Report	Clarke-Harris 77'	Stadium: Falmer Stadium; Attendance: 26,966; Referee: Craig Pawson

=== EFL Cup ===
On 16 June 2017, Coventry City were drawn at home to Blackburn Rovers in the first round.

8 August 2017 First round	Coventry City	1–3	Blackburn Rovers	Coventry
19:45 BST	Nazon 22'	Report	Evans 16'; Smallwood 33'; Samuel 56'	Stadium: Ricoh Arena; Attendance: 5,372; Referee: Darren England

=== EFL Trophy ===
On 12 July 2017, Coventry City were drawn in Northern Group E against Shrewsbury Town, Walsall and West Bromwich Albion Academy.

Pos	Lge	Team	Pld	W	PW	PL	L	GF	GA	GD	Pts	Qualification
1	L1	Walsall (Q)	3	2	0	1	0	6	3	+3	7	Round 2
2	L1	Shrewsbury Town (Q)	3	2	0	0	1	6	3	+3	6	Round 2
3	L2	Coventry City (E)	3	1	1	0	1	6	6	0	5	
4	ACA	West Bromwich Albion U21 (E)	3	0	0	0	3	2	8	−6	0	

Updated to match(es) played on 3 October 2017. Source: EFL.com
(E) Eliminated; (Q) Qualified to the phase indicated

29 August 2017 Group stage	Coventry City	2–3	Shrewsbury Town	Coventry
19:45 BST	Andreu 51' (yellow card) 66'; McNulty 63' (pen.)	Report	Payne 30'; Gnahoua; Bolton (red card) 69'; Godfrey (yellow card) 71'; Adams (yellow card) 79'; Riley 90+4'	Stadium: Ricoh Arena; Attendance: 1,968

3 October 2017 Group stage	Walsall	2–2 (3–4 p)	Coventry City	Walsall
19:45 BST	Ismail 32' (pen.); Bakayoko (yellow card) 42'; Edwards (yellow card) 83'; Agyei 90+2'	Report	McNulty 54' (pen.); Ponticelli 59'	Stadium: Bescot Stadium; Attendance: 1,517; Referee: Robert Lewis
	Penalties
	Oztumer (penalty scored); Leahy (penalty scored); Agyei (penalty missed); Bakayoko (penalty scored); Edwards (penalty missed)		McNulty (penalty missed); Vincenti (penalty scored); Stevenson (penalty scored); Shipley (penalty scored); Ponticelli (penalty scored)

7 November 2017 Group stage	Coventry City	2–1	West Bromwich Albion Academy	Coventry
19:45 GMT	Hyam (yellow card) 16'; Stevenson 58'; Biamou 62'; Di. Kelly-Evans (yellow card) 70'; De. Kelly-Evans (yellow card) 90+2'	Report	Burke 72'	Stadium: Ricoh Arena; Attendance: 1,429; Referee: John Busby

== Squad information ==
=== Squad details ===
No.	Name	Position	Nationality	Place of birth	Date of birth (age) *	Club apps *	Club goals *	Signed from	Date signed	Fee	Contract end
Goalkeepers
1	Lee Burge	GK	(England)	Hereford	9 January 1993 (aged 24)	71	0	Academy	1 June 2010	Trainee	30 June 2019
13	Liam O'Brien	GK	(England)	Ruislip	30 November 1991 (aged 25)	0	0	Portsmouth	1 July 2017	Free	30 June 2019
33	Corey Addai	GK	(England)	London	10 October 1997 (aged 19)	0	0	Academy	1 June 2014	Trainee	30 June 2019
40	Tom Billson	GK	(England)	Shrewsbury	18 October 2000 (aged 16)	0	0	Academy	1 June 2017	Trainee	30 June 2019
Defenders
2	Jack Grimmer	RB	(Scotland)	Aberdeen	25 January 1994 (aged 23)	0	0	Fulham	5 July 2017	Free	30 June 2019
3	Chris Stokes	LB	(England)	Frome	8 March 1991 (aged 26)	63	3	Forest Green Rovers	21 February 2015	Free	30 June 2019
4	Jordan Willis	CB	(England)	Coventry	24 August 1994 (aged 22)	127	5	Academy	1 June 2011	Trainee	30 June 2019
5	Rod McDonald	CB	(England)	Liverpool	11 April 1992 (aged 25)	0	0	Northampton Town	1 July 2017	Undisclosed	30 June 2019
12	Tom Davies	CB	(England)	Warrington	18 April 1992 (aged 25)	0	0	Portsmouth	31 August 2017	Undisclosed	30 June 2019
15	Dominic Hyam	CB	(Scotland) (England)	Leuchars	20 December 1995 (aged 21)	0	0	Reading	1 July 2017	Free	30 June 2019
20	Dion Kelly-Evans	RB	(England)	Coventry	21 September 1996 (aged 20)	34	0	Academy	1 June 2014	Trainee	30 June 2018
24	Ryan Haynes	LB	(England)	Northampton	27 September 1995 (aged 21)	72	5	Academy	27 March 2013	Trainee	30 June 2019
34	Chris Camwell	LB	(England)	Nuneaton	27 October 1998 (aged 18)	0	0	Academy	1 July 2016	Trainee	30 June 2021
36	Reece Ford	DF	(Republic of Ireland)	Coventry	28 October 1998 (aged 18)	0	0	Academy	1 July 2016	Trainee	30 June 2020
39	Jordon Thompson	DF	(England)	Coventry	8 April 1999 (aged 18)	0	0	Academy	1 July 2016	Trainee	30 June 2021
Midfielders
6	Liam Kelly	DM	(Scotland) (England)	Milton Keynes	10 February 1990 (aged 27)	0	0	Leyton Orient	1 July 2017	Free	30 June 2019
7	Peter Vincenti	RM	(Jersey)	Saint Peter	7 July 1986 (aged 30)	0	0	Rochdale	1 July 2017	Free	30 June 2019
8	Michael Doyle	CM	(Republic of Ireland)	Dublin	8 August 1981 (aged 35)	304	25	Portsmouth	1 July 2017	Free	30 June 2019
11	Jodi Jones	RW	(England)	Bow	22 October 1997 (aged 19)	51	2	Dagenham & Redbridge	10 May 2016	Undisclosed	30 June 2020
17	Jordan Maguire-Drew	RW	(England)	Crawley	19 September 1997 (aged 19)	0	0	Brighton & Hove Albion	3 January 2018	Loan	30 June 2018
19	Tony Andreu	AM	(France)	Cagnes-sur-Mer	22 May 1988 (aged 29)	0	0	Norwich City	10 Aug 2017	Free	30 June 2019
22	Devon Kelly-Evans	LM	(England)	Coventry	21 September 1996 (aged 20)	1	0	Academy	1 June 2014	Trainee	30 June 2018
26	Jordan Shipley	CM	(England)	Coventry	26 September 1997 (aged 19)	1	0	Academy	1 July 2016	Trainee	30 June 2020
27	Josh Barrett	AM	(Republic of Ireland) (England)	Oxford	21 June 1998 (aged 19)	0	0	Reading	2 January 2018	Loan	30 June 2018
28	Callum Maycock	CM	(England)	Birmingham	23 December 1997 (aged 19)	7	0	Academy	1 July 2016	Trainee	30 June 2020
29	Bilal Sayoud	AM	(England)	London	5 May 1997 (aged 20)	0	0	Nike Academy	24 March 2016	Free	30 June 2018
30	Tom Bayliss	CM	(England)	Leicester	6 April 1999 (aged 18)	0	0	Academy	1 July 2016	Trainee	30 June 2020
32	Kyel Reid	LM	(England) (Jamaica)	Deptford	26 November 1987 (aged 29)	37	2	Preston North End	28 July 2016	Free	30 June 2018
35	Kyle Finn	LM	(England)	Warwick	7 December 1998 (aged 18)	0	0	Academy	1 July 2016	Trainee	30 June 2020
37	Jak Hickman	MF	(England)	Sandwell	11 September 1998 (aged 18)	0	0	Academy	1 July 2016	Trainee	30 June 2021
	Zain Westbrooke	CM	(England)	Chertsey	28 October 1996 (aged 20)	0	0	Brentford	10 May 2018	Free	30 June 2020
Forwards
9	Maxime Biamou	CF	(France)	Créteil	13 November 1990 (aged 26)	0	0	Sutton United	1 July 2017	Undisclosed	30 June 2019
10	Marc McNulty	CF	(Scotland)	Edinburgh	14 September 1992 (aged 24)	0	0	Sheffield United	1 July 2017	Free	30 June 2019
16	Stuart Beavon	CF	(England)	Reading	5 May 1984 (aged 33)	17	3	Burton Albion	1 January 2017	Free	30 June 2019
18	Jonson Clarke-Harris	CF	(England) (Jamaica)	Leicester	20 July 1994 (aged 22)	1	0	Rotherham United	31 January 2018	Loan	30 June 2018
38	Jordan Ponticelli	CF	(England)	Coventry	10 September 1998 (aged 18)	0	0	Strachan Football Foundation	26 July 2016	Free	30 June 2022
Left before the end of the season
12	James Pearson	RB	(England)	Sheffield	19 January 1993 (aged 24)	0	0	Barnet	4 August 2017	Free	Non-contract
14	Kwame Thomas	CF	(England)	Nottingham	28 September 1995 (aged 21)	14	3	Derby County	1 July 2016	Free	30 June 2018
18	Duckens Nazon	CF	(Haiti) (France)	Paris	7 April 1994 (aged 23)	0	0	Wolverhampton Wanderers	4 August 2017	Loan	1 January 2018
23	Reice Charles-Cook	GK	(England)	Lewisham	8 April 1994 (aged 23)	61	0	Bury	1 August 2014	Free	30 June 2018
23	Carl Baker	AM	(England)	Prescot	26 December 1982 (aged 34)	182	28	Unattached	9 March 2018	Free	30 June 2018
25	Jordan Turnbull	CB	(England)	Trowbridge	30 October 1994 (aged 22)	46	2	Southampton	15 August 2016	Undisclosed	30 June 2019
27	Darragh Leahy	LB	(Republic of Ireland)	Dublin	15 April 1998 (aged 19)	0	0	Academy	1 July 2016	Trainee	30 June 2018
31	Ben Stevenson	CM	(England)	Leicester	23 March 1997 (aged 20)	36	2	Academy	1 July 2015	Trainee	30 June 2020

* Player age and appearances/goals for the club as of beginning of 2017–18 season.

=== Appearances ===
Correct as of match played on 28 May 2018

No.	Nat.	Player	Pos.	League Two	FA Cup	EFL Cup	EFL Trophy	League Two Play-offs	Total
1	(England)	Lee Burge	GK	40	4		1	3	48
2	(Scotland)	Jack Grimmer	DF	42	5	1	2	3	53
3	(England)	Chris Stokes	DF	28+1	2		1	3	35
4	(England)	Jordan Willis	DF	35	4		1	2	42
5	(England)	Rod McDonald	DF	36+1	2+1	1			41
6	(Scotland)	Liam Kelly	MF	30+3	2			3	38
7	(Jersey)	Peter Vincenti	MF	18+6	1+1		3		29
8	(Republic of Ireland)	Michael Doyle	MF	44	4		1	3	52
9	(France)	Maxime Biamou	FW	20+19	3+2	1	0+1	3	49
10	(Scotland)	Marc McNulty	FW	40+2	5		2	3	52
11	(England)	Jodi Jones	MF	19	1	1	1		22
12	(England)	Tom Davies	DF	15+6	3			1	25
13	(England)	Liam O'Brien	GK	6+1	1	1	2		11
15	(Scotland)	Dominic Hyam	DF	11+3	1	1	3	3	22
16	(England)	Stuart Beavon	FW	9+5		0+1	2+1		18
17	(England)	Jordan Maguire-Drew	MF	3	1				4
18	(England)	Jonson Clarke-Harris	FW	12+5	1			0+3	21
19	(France)	Tony Andreu	MF	2+3			1		6
20	(England)	Dion Kelly-Evans	DF	1+1	0+1		3		6
22	(England)	Devon Kelly-Evans	MF	8+6	0+1	1	1		17
24	(England)	Ryan Haynes	DF	18+3	3+1				25
26	(England)	Jordan Shipley	MF	25+5	4+1	1	1+1	3	41
27	(Republic of Ireland)	Josh Barrett	MF	1+5	2				8
28	(England)	Callum Maycock	MF	0+1	0+1		2+1		5
29	(England)	Bilal Sayoud	MF				0+1		1
30	(England)	Tom Bayliss	MF	23	4+1		0+1	3	32
32	(England)	Kyel Reid	MF	2+11				0+1	14
33	(England)	Corey Addai	GK						
34	(England)	Chris Camwell	DF			1	1		2
35	(England)	Kyle Finn	MF			0+1			1
36	(Republic of Ireland)	Reece Ford	DF						
37	(England)	Jak Hickman	MF						
38	(England)	Jordan Ponticelli	FW	4+15	1+1	0+1	0+1	0+3	26
39	(England)	Jordon Thompson	DF				0+1		1
40	(England)	Tom Bilson	GK						
	(England)	Zain Westbrooke	MF						
Left before the end of the season
12	(England)	James Pearson	DF				1		1
14	(England)	Kwame Thomas	FW				1		1
18	(Haiti)	Duckens Nazon	FW	11+10	1+1	1			24
23	(England)	Reice Charles-Cook	GK						
23	(England)	Carl Baker	MF						
25	(England)	Jordan Turnbull	DF						
27	(Republic of Ireland)	Darragh Leahy	DF						
31	(England)	Ben Stevenson	MF	2+3	1+2	1	3		12

=== Goalscorers ===
Correct as of match played on 28 May 2018

No.	Nat.	Player	Pos.	League Two	FA Cup	EFL Cup	EFL Trophy	League Two Play-offs	Total
10	(Scotland)	Marc McNulty	FW	23	1	0	2	2	28
9	(France)	Maxime Biamou	FW	5	1	0	1	2	9
18	(Haiti)	Duckens Nazon	FW	6	1	1	0	0	8
26	(England)	Jordan Shipley	MF	4	1	0	0	1	6
30	(England)	Tom Bayliss	MF	5	0	0	0	1	6
38	(England)	Jordan Ponticelli	FW	3	2	0	1	0	6
11	(England)	Jodi Jones	MF	5	0	0	0	0	5
18	(England)	Jonson Clarke-Harris	FW	3	1	0	0	0	4
2	(Scotland)	Jack Grimmer	DF	1	1	0	0	1	3
7	(Jersey)	Peter Vincenti	MF	3	0	0	0	0	3
8	(Republic of Ireland)	Michael Doyle	MF	3	0	0	0	0	3
4	(England)	Jordan Willis	DF	0	1	0	0	1	2
6	(Scotland)	Liam Kelly	MF	1	0	0	0	0	1
19	(France)	Tony Andreu	MF	0	0	0	1	0	1
22	(England)	Devon Kelly-Evans	MF	1	0	0	0	0	1
31	(England)	Ben Stevenson	MF	0	0	0	1	0	1
Own goals				1	0	0	0	0	1
Totals				64	9	1	6	8	88

=== Assists ===
Correct as of match played on 28 May 2018

No.	Nat.	Player	Pos.	League Two	FA Cup	EFL Cup	EFL Trophy	League Two Play-offs	Total
10	(Scotland)	Marc McNulty	FW	5	1	0	1	3	10
11	(England)	Jodi Jones	MF	4	1	0	1	0	6
9	(France)	Maxime Biamou	FW	5	0	0	0	0	5
2	(Scotland)	Jack Grimmer	DF	2	2	0	0	0	4
18	(England)	Jonson Clarke-Harris	FW	4	0	0	0	0	4
18	(Haiti)	Duckens Nazon	FW	3	1	0	0	0	4
26	(England)	Jordan Shipley	MF	4	0	0	0	0	4
4	(England)	Jordan Willis	DF	2	0	0	0	1	3
6	(Scotland)	Liam Kelly	MF	2	0	0	0	1	3
8	(Republic of Ireland)	Michael Doyle	MF	2	0	0	0	1	3
30	(England)	Tom Bayliss	MF	2	1	0	0	0	3
7	(Jersey)	Peter Vincenti	MF	2	0	0	0	0	2
32	(England)	Kyel Reid	MF	2	0	0	0	0	2
3	(England)	Chris Stokes	DF	1	0	0	0	0	1
12	(England)	Tom Davies	DF	0	1	0	0	0	1
15	(Scotland)	Dominic Hyam	DF	0	0	0	0	1	1
17	(England)	Jordan Maguire-Drew	MF	1	0	0	0	0	1
28	(England)	Callum Maycock	MF	0	0	0	1	0	1
31	(England)	Ben Stevenson	MF	0	0	0	1	0	1
Totals				41	7	0	4	7	59

=== Yellow cards ===
Correct as of match played on 28 May 2018

No.	Nat.	Player	Pos.	League Two	FA Cup	EFL Cup	EFL Trophy	League Two Play-offs	Total
8	(Republic of Ireland)	Michael Doyle	MF	10	2	0	0	2	14
5	(England)	Rod McDonald	DF	8	1	0	0	0	9
10	(Scotland)	Marc McNulty	FW	5	0	0	0	1	6
18	(Haiti)	Duckens Nazon	FW	5	1	0	0	0	6
2	(Scotland)	Jack Grimmer	DF	5	0	0	0	0	5
3	(England)	Chris Stokes	DF	3	0	0	0	1	4
7	(Jersey)	Peter Vincenti	MF	3	1	0	0	0	4
12	(England)	Tom Davies	DF	4	0	0	0	0	4
30	(England)	Tom Bayliss	MF	4	0	0	0	0	4
1	(England)	Lee Burge	GK	3	0	0	0	0	3
6	(Scotland)	Liam Kelly	MF	3	0	0	0	0	3
9	(France)	Maxime Biamou	FW	3	0	0	0	0	3
11	(England)	Jodi Jones	MF	3	0	0	0	0	3
26	(England)	Jordan Shipley	MF	3	0	0	0	0	3
15	(Scotland)	Dominic Hyam	DF	0	0	0	1	1	2
18	(England)	Jonson Clarke-Harris	FW	2	0	0	0	0	2
20	(England)	Dion Kelly-Evans	DF	1	0	0	1	0	2
22	(England)	Devon Kelly-Evans	MF	1	0	0	1	0	2
24	(England)	Ryan Haynes	DF	2	0	0	0	0	2
19	(France)	Tony Andreu	MF	0	0	0	1	0	1
31	(England)	Ben Stevenson	MF	1	0	0	0	0	1
32	(England)	Kyel Reid	MF	1	0	0	0	0	1
34	(England)	Chris Camwell	DF	0	0	1	0	0	1
Totals				70	5	1	4	5	85

=== Red cards ===
Correct as of match played on 28 May 2018

No.	Nat.	Player	Pos.	League Two	FA Cup	EFL Cup	EFL Trophy	League Two Play-offs	Total
4	(England)	Jordan Willis	DF	1	0	0	0	0	1
5	(England)	Rod McDonald	DF	1	0	0	0	0	1
Totals				2	0	0	0	0	2

=== Captains ===
Correct as of match played on 28 May 2018

No.	Nat.	Player	Pos.	League Two	FA Cup	EFL Cup	EFL Trophy	League Two Play-offs	Total
8	(Republic of Ireland)	Michael Doyle	MF	44	4	0	1	3	52
4	(England)	Jordan Willis	DF	2	0	0	1	0	3
2	(Scotland)	Jack Grimmer	DF	0	0	0	1	0	1
5	(England)	Rod McDonald	DF	0	0	1	0	0	1
6	(Scotland)	Liam Kelly	MF	0	1	0	0	0	1
Totals				46	5	1	3	3	58

=== Suspensions served ===
No.	Nat.	Player	Pos.	Date suspended	Reason	Matches missed
5	(England)	Rod McDonald	DF	9 September 2017	1 red card	Carlisle United (H)
18	(Haiti)	Duckens Nazon	FW	18 November 2017	5 yellow cards	Stevenage (A)
5	(England)	Rod McDonald	DF	25 November 2017	5 yellow cards	Boreham Wood (H)
4	(England)	Jordan Willis	DF	24 February 2018	1 red card	Wycombe Wanderers (A)
12	(England)	Tom Davies	DF	15 May 2018	Violent conduct	Notts County (A) +2

=== Hat-tricks ===
No.	Nat.	Player	Pos.	Date	Opponents	Ground	Result
11	(England)	Jodi Jones	MF	5 August 2017	Notts County	Ricoh Arena	3–0
10	(Scotland)	Marc McNulty	FW	24 March 2018	Grimsby Town	Ricoh Arena	4–0
10	(Scotland)	Marc McNulty	FW	28 April 2018	Cheltenham Town	Whaddon Road	6–1

=== Monthly & weekly awards ===
No.	Nat.	Player	Pos.	Date	Award	Ref
11	(England)	Jodi Jones	MF	7 August 2017	EFL Team of the Week	
11	(England)	Jodi Jones	MF	25 September 2017	EFL Team of the Week	
	(England)	Mark Robins		30 October 2017	EFL Manager of the Week	
26	(England)	Jordan Shipley	MF	16 November 2017	EFL League Two Goal of the Month	
10	(Scotland)	Marc McNulty	FW	22 January 2018	EFL Team of the Week	
10	(Scotland)	Marc McNulty	FW	9 February 2018	EFL League Two Player of the Month	
1	(England)	Lee Burge	GK	12 March 2018	EFL Team of the Week	
10	(Scotland)	Marc McNulty	FW	26 March 2018	EFL Team of the Week	
38	(England)	Jordan Ponticelli	FW	16 April 2018	EFL Team of the Week	
10	(Scotland)	Marc McNulty	FW	30 April 2018	EFL Team of the Week	

=== End-of-season awards ===
No.	Nat.	Player	Pos.	Date	Award	Ref
1	(England)	Lee Burge	GK	3 April 2018	EFL League Two Team of the Year	
4	(England)	Jordan Willis	DF	3 April 2018	EFL League Two Team of the Year	
2	(Scotland)	Jack Grimmer	DF	17 April 2018	PFA League Two Team of the Year	
8	(Republic of Ireland)	Michael Doyle	MF	5 May 2018	CCFC Former Players' Association Player of the Year	
10	(Scotland)	Marc McNulty	FW	6 May 2018	CCFC Top Goalscorer	
10	(Scotland)	Marc McNulty	FW	6 May 2018	CCFC Player of the Season	
30	(England)	Tom Bayliss	MF	6 May 2018	CCFC Young Player of the Season	
10	(Scotland)	Marc McNulty	FW	6 May 2018	CCFC Players' Player of the Season	
9	(France)	Maxime Biamou	FW	6 May 2018	CCFC Goal of the Season	
3	(England)	Chris Stokes	DF	6 May 2018	CCFC Community Player of the Season	

=== International appearances ===
No.	Nat.	Player	Pos.	Date	Match	Stats	Ref
18	(Haiti)	Duckens Nazon	FW	10 October 2017	Japan 3–3 Haiti	2 goals	
18	(Haiti)	Duckens Nazon	FW	10 November 2017	United Arab Emirates 0–1 Haiti		

== Transfers ==
=== Transfers in ===
Date	Position	Nationality	Name	From	Fee	Ref.
1 July 2017	CF	(France)	Maxime Biamou	(England) Sutton United	Undisclosed	
1 July 2017	CM	(Republic of Ireland)	Michael Doyle	(England) Portsmouth	Free	
1 July 2017	CB	(Scotland)	Dominic Hyam	(England) Reading	Free	
1 July 2017	DM	(Scotland)	Liam Kelly	(England) Leyton Orient	Free	
1 July 2017	CB	(England)	Rod McDonald	(England) Northampton Town	Undisclosed	
1 July 2017	CF	(Scotland)	Marc McNulty	(England) Sheffield United	Free	
1 July 2017	GK	(England)	Liam O'Brien	(England) Portsmouth	Free	
1 July 2017	RM	(Jersey)	Peter Vincenti	(England) Rochdale	Free	
5 July 2017	RB	(Scotland)	Jack Grimmer	(England) Fulham	Free	
4 August 2017	RB	(England)	James Pearson	(England) Barnet	Free	
10 August 2017	AM	(France)	Tony Andreu	(England) Norwich City	Free	
31 August 2017	CB	(England)	Tom Davies	(England) Portsmouth	Undisclosed	
9 March 2018	AM	(England)	Carl Baker	Unattached	Free	
10 May 2018	CM	(England)	Zain Westbrooke	(England) Brentford	Free	

=== Transfers out ===
Date	Position	Nationality	Name	To	Fee	Ref.
1 July 2017	CM	(Burundi)	Gaël Bigirimana	(Scotland) Motherwell	Free	
1 July 2017	CB	(England)	Nathan Clarke	(England) Grimsby Town (Note: Nathan Clarke joined Grimsby Town following his release.)	Released	
1 July 2017	DM	(England)	Jack Finch	(England) Kidderminster Harriers (Note: Jack Finch joined Kidderminster Harriers following his release.)	Released	
1 July 2017	RB	(Republic of Ireland)	Kevin Foley	(England) Billericay Town (Note: Kevin Foley joined Billericay Town following his release.)	Released	
1 July 2017	CM	(Bulgaria)	Vladimir Gadzhev	(Cyprus) Anorthosis Famagusta (Note: Vladimir Gadzhev joined Anorthosis Famagusta following his release.)	Released	
1 July 2017	RM	(Portugal)	Rúben Lameiras	(England) Plymouth Argyle (Note: Rúben Lameiras joined Plymouth Argyle following his release.)	Released	
1 July 2017	CM	(Australia)	Andy Rose	(Scotland) Motherwell (Note: Andy Rose joined Motherwell following his release.)	Released	
1 July 2017	LW	(Scotland)	Kyle Spence	(England) Hampton & Richmond Borough (Note: Kyle Spence joined Hampton & Richmond Borough following his release.)	Released	
1 July 2017	CF	(England)	Marcus Tudgay	(England) Sutton Coldfield Town (Note: Marcus Tudgay joined Sutton Coldfield Town following his release.)	Released	
1 July 2017	CB	(England)	Jacob Whitmore	(England) Barwell (Note: Jacob Whitmore joined Barwell following his release.)	Released	
17 July 2017	CB	(Wales)	Cian Harries	(Wales) Swansea City	Undisclosed	
8 August 2017	FW	(Wales)	George Thomas	(England) Leicester City	Undisclosed	
30 August 2017	RB	(England)	James Pearson	(England) Kidderminster Harriers (Note: James Pearson joined Kidderminster Harriers following his release.)	Released	
31 August 2017	GK	(England)	Reice Charles-Cook	(England) Swindon Town	Undisclosed	
14 September 2017	MF	(England)	Charlie McCann	(England) Manchester United	Undisclosed	
21 December 2017	LB	(Republic of Ireland)	Darragh Leahy	(Republic of Ireland) Bohemians (Note: Darragh Leahy joined Bohemians following his release.)	Released	
11 January 2018	CB	(England)	Jordan Turnbull	(England) Northampton Town	Free	
31 January 2018	CM	(England)	Ben Stevenson	(England) Wolverhampton Wanderers	Undisclosed	
31 January 2018	CF	(England)	Kwame Thomas	(England) Solihull Moors	Free	
4 May 2018	AM	(England)	Carl Baker	(England) Nuneaton Borough (Note: Carl Baker joined Nuneaton Borough following his release.)	Released	

=== Loans in ===
Date from	Position	Nationality	Name	From	Date to	Ref.
4 August 2017	CF	(Haiti)	Duckens Nazon	(England) Wolverhampton Wanderers	1 January 2018	
2 January 2018	AM	(Republic of Ireland)	Josh Barrett	(England) Reading	30 June 2018	
3 January 2018	RW	(England)	Jordan Maguire-Drew	(England) Brighton & Hove Albion	30 June 2018	
31 January 2018	CF	(England)	Jonson Clarke-Harris	(England) Rotherham United	30 June 2018	

=== Loans out ===
Date from	Position	Nationality	Name	To	Date to	Ref.
31 July 2017	CB	(England)	Jordan Turnbull	(Scotland) Partick Thistle	10 January 2018	
7 August 2017	LM	(England)	Kyel Reid	(England) Colchester United	8 January 2018	
8 September 2017	CF	(England)	Kwame Thomas	(England) Sutton United	7 October 2017	
15 September 2017	DF	(England)	Jordon Thompson	(England) Barrow	7 November 2017	
13 October 2017	LB	(England)	Chris Camwell	(England) Solihull Moors	12 November 2017	
13 October 2017	MF	(England)	Bilal Sayoud	(England) Mickleover Sports	12 November 2017	
13 October 2017	MF	(England)	Jak Hickman	(England) Mickleover Sports	12 November 2017	
17 November 2017	CF	(England)	Kwame Thomas	(England) Solihull Moors	31 January 2018	
24 November 2017	LB	(Republic of Ireland)	Darragh Leahy	(England) Nuneaton Town	21 December 2017	
11 January 2018	GK	(England)	Corey Addai	(England) Hendon	11 February 2018	
2 March 2018	GK	(England)	Corey Addai	(England) Dulwich Hamlet	31 March 2018	
9 March 2018	MF	(England)	Jak Hickman	(England) Mickleover Sports	30 June 2018	

=== Trials ===
Date	Position	Nationality	Name	From	Signed	Ref.
July 2017	CF	(Republic of Ireland)	Greg Moorhouse	(Northern Ireland) Glenavon	No	
July 2017	CM	(England)	Jordan Lussey	(England) Southport	No	
July 2017	CM	(England)	Matty Miles	(England) Leicester City	No	
July 2017	RB	(England)	James Pearson	(England) Barnet	Yes	
July 2017	CB	(Scotland)	Alex Davey	(England) Chelsea	No	
July 2017	CB	(Slovakia)	Matej Podstavek	(Lebanon) Al-Ansar SC	No	
August 2017	CF	(Wales)	Owain Jones	(Wales) Swansea City	No	
January 2018	AM	(England)	Carl Baker	(India) ATK	Yes	
January 2018	CF	(England)	Ben Stephens	(England) Stratford Town	No	
February 2018	MF	(Northern Ireland)	Chris Paul	(England) Queens Park Rangers	No	
March 2018	CF	(England)	Jordan Clarke	(England) Birmingham City	No	
April 2018	CM	(England)	Zain Westbrooke	(England) Brentford	Yes	
April 2018	CF	(Zambia)	Mwiya Malumo	(England) Wigan Athletic	No	
April 2018	RW	(England)	Leon Okuboyejo	(England) Reading	No	
April 2018	CF	(Republic of Ireland)	Evan Pierce	(England) West Bromwich Albion	No	
April 2018	CB	(Republic of Ireland)	James Finnerty	(England) Aston Villa	No	
