= Lee Burge =

English footballer (born 1993)

Personal information
- Full name: Lee Stephen Burge
- Date of birth: 9 January 1993 (age 33)
- Place of birth: Hereford, England
- Height: 1.90 m (6 ft 3 in)
- Position: Goalkeeper

Youth career
- 2004–2011: Coventry City

Senior career*
Years	Team	Apps	(Gls)
2011–2019	Coventry City	140	(0)
2013	→ Nuneaton Town (loan)	17	(0)
2019–2022	Sunderland	49	(0)
2022–2026	Northampton Town	108	(0)
- * Club domestic league appearances and goals as of 13:48, 14 June 2026 (UTC)

Lee Stephen Burge (born 9 January 1993) is an English professional footballer who plays as a goalkeeper.

Burge turned professional at Coventry City and established himself as the first-choice goalkeeper there in the 2016–17 season, having previously gained experience on loan at Nuneaton Town in non-League football. He won the EFL Trophy in 2017 and the League Two play-offs in 2018, making a total of 160 appearances in eight seasons at the club. He moved to Sunderland in July 2019 and was initially the second choice there. He won another EFL Trophy in 2021, also being named on the 2020–21 League One Team of the Season. He dropped to the bench again for the 2021–22 campaign and subsequently moved on to Northampton Town. He was promoted out of League Two with the club in 2022–23, featuring a total of 113 times in a three-season stay.

== Club career ==
Burge attended Aylestone School in Hereford and played junior football with Pegasus Junior. He was spotted by Coventry City scouts at the age of eleven and was trained by Gregor Rioch and Steve Ogrizovic.

=== Coventry City ===
Burge turned professional at Coventry City on 27 May 2011 when he signed a one-year contract for the 2011–12 season. He was given a new deal in September after being named on the bench by manager Andy Thorn. On 30 January 2013, Burge joined Conference National side Nuneaton Town on loan for a month, with a view to gaining more experience. He made his Nuneaton debut on 2 February in a 3–2 loss to Stockport County. He played 17 games for Kevin Wilkin's Boro in the second half of the 2012–13 season, keeping ten clean sheets. He signed a new three-year contract in May 2014.

At the beginning of the 2014–15 season, following Joe Murphy's transfer, Burge was handed the number one shirt and made his professional debut on 13 August in a 2–1 League Cup loss to Cardiff City. On 9 November, he was sent off 39 minutes into a 2–1 defeat to mid-table Conference North side Worcester City at the Ricoh Arena following an altercation with Daniel Nti. Manager Steven Pressley signed Jamie Jones on an emergency loan from Preston North End after Ryan Allsop returned to parent club AFC Bournemouth, and told the media that Burge still would "get his opportunity" to play games. Burge in fact was restored to the Sky Blues first XI when Neil MacFarlane stepped in as caretaker following Pressley's sacking in February. New manager Tony Mowbray persisted with Burge in goal despite him being beaten from a free kick at his near post to let slip a one-goal lead in a draw with Bradford City.

Speaking in July 2015, Mowbray confirmed that Burge would be City's first-choice goalkeeper and hoped to sign a veteran as his support and competition. He in fact played only ten games in the first half of the 2015–16 campaign before undergoing shoulder surgery in February, which caused him to miss the rest of the season. Young deputy Reice Charles-Cook had initially stepped in for a game when Burge withdrew due to illness and kept his place after keeping a string of clean sheets. Charles-Cook and Burge competed to establish themselves as the club's first-choice stopper throughout the 2016–17 season, with Burge regaining his starting place in the league under caretaker manager Mark Venus and retaining his place under new manager Russell Slade. Charles-Cook played in goal for Coventry's EFL Trophy run to the final. Yet Burge replaced him in the starting eleven for the final at Wembley Stadium on 2 April, when City secured the trophy with a 2–1 victory over Oxford United. Burge made three late saves to prevent an Oxford equaliser. He went on to be named CCFC Supporters' Club Player of the Season, an alternative to the official Coventry City Player of the Year award. Burge signed a new two-year deal in June 2017 and said he hoped to help the team to make an immediate return following relegation down to League Two.

He started the 2017–18 season on the bench, though he was soon returned to the starting eleven after new signing Liam O'Brien started to make mistakes. On 12 March, he was named on the EFL Team of the Week after making what manager Mark Robins described as a "world-class save" in a 1–0 win over Barnet. Burge started in the 2018 EFL League Two play-off final victory over Exeter City at Wembley, making three late saves as Coventry secured a 3–1 win to gain promotion back to League One. On 17 September, he earned a place on the EFL Team of the Week after he "pulled off a number of fine stops" in a 1–0 victory over Barnsley. He was again named in the Team of the Week on 1 October following a "strong display" against Sunderland. The following March, it was reported that he was a summer transfer target for Hull City. Robins deemed Burge surplus to requirements and signed Marko Maroši as his replacement after releasing Burge upon the expiry of his contract at the end of the 2018–19 season. He was linked with a move to Lincoln City.

=== Sunderland ===
On 3 July 2019, Burge joined League One rivals Sunderland on a two-year deal. He said "this is a club that can offer me everything I want and the stature of the club is incredible". Manager Jack Ross signed him as back up to established number one Jon McLaughlin. He did find gametime at the Stadium of Light when McLaughlin was away with Scotland on international duty.

Speaking in November 2020, manager Phil Parkinson said that Burge was in a three-way battle with Remi Matthews and Anthony Patterson for the starting role following the departure of Jon McLaughlin. Burge had started the 2020–21 season with six clean sheets in ten League One appearances before being sidelined with injury. He kept a clean sheet in the 2021 EFL Trophy final win over Tranmere Rovers, his third win in a Wembley final. Burge was named in the League One Team of the Season at the EFL's annual awards ceremony. He had kept 18 clean sheets in 41 League One games for the Black Cats.

He played nine games of the 2021–22 campaign, failing to feature following an EFL Cup quarter-final defeat to Arsenal on 21 December. Sunderland gained promotion through the League One play-offs, though Burge was not named in the matchday squad for the final. Burge had spent several weeks sidelined with a heart issue that manager Lee Johnson controversially stated could have been caused by the COVID-19 vaccine. He returned to training at the Academy of Light under new boss Alex Neil. Patterson established himself as first-choice goalkeeper in Burge's absence. He was released by Sunderland at the end of his contract.

=== Northampton Town ===
On 22 June 2022, Burge signed a two-year contract with League Two club Northampton Town after manager Jon Brady claimed to have fended off interest from other clubs to sign a goalkeeper of "first class pedigree". He was signed to replace highly rated goalkeeper Liam Roberts, who had departed for Middlesbrough, and instead competed with Jonny Maxted for a first-team place at Sixfields. Brady signed Tom King on a short-term deal after Burge injured himself in January, though restored Burge in goal despite King keeping four clean sheets in eight games. Northampton secured the third-place automatic promotion at the end of the 2022–23 season, with Burge playing 39 games. He struggled with injuries and played 20 games in the 2023–24 season as the Cobblers finished 14th in League One. He signed a new contract with the club in May 2024 to run for an initial year with a one-year option.

Speaking in May 2025, manager Kevin Nolan said of Burge that "there's a lot of work he could do to make himself better" and that he hoped to sign a new goalkeeper to push him for a starting place. Burge started the 2025–26 season in goal before losing his place to Ross Fitzsimons after sustaining an injury in September, only regaining his place in the team in February. On 4 June 2026, despite the club initially offering Burge a new contract, newly appointed manager Chris Hogg reversed the decision and said that "we have decided to go in a different direction in the goalkeeping position and so we have parted company with Lee". He was part of the 45-man Professional Footballers' Association (PFA) free agent squad in July 2026.

== Style of play ==
Burge is a goalkeeper whose main strength is his shot-stopping ability, though has been criticised for making errors and lacking presence in the box.

== Personal life ==
On 30 September 2018, Burge was struck by a puck while watching local ice hockey team Coventry Blaze play against the Sheffield Steelers at the SkyDome Arena. He supports Hereford United.

== Career statistics ==
As of match played 2 May 2026

Appearances and goals by club, season and competition
Club	Season	League			FA Cup		League Cup		Other		Total	
Club	Season	Division	Apps	Goals	Apps	Goals	Apps	Goals	Apps	Goals	Apps	Goals
Coventry City	2011–12	Championship	0	0	0	0	0	0	—		0	0
Coventry City	2012–13	League One	0	0	0	0	0	0	0	0	0	0
Coventry City	2013–14	League One	0	0	0	0	0	0	0	0	0	0
Coventry City	2014–15	League One	18	0	1	0	1	0	2 (Note: Appearance(s) in the Football League Trophy / EFL Trophy)	0	22	0
Coventry City	2015–16	League One	9	0	1	0	0	0	0	0	10	0
Coventry City	2016–17	League One	33	0	3	0	0	0	3 (Note: Appearance(s) in EFL Trophy)	0	39	0
Coventry City	2017–18	League Two	40	0	4	0	0	0	4 (Note: Three appearances in the play-offs and one appearance in the EFL Trophy)	0	48	0
Coventry City	2018–19	League One	40	0	1	0	0	0	0	0	41	0
Coventry City	Total		140	0	10	0	1	0	9	0	160	0
Nuneaton Town (loan)	2012–13	Conference Premier	17	0	—		—		0	0	17	0
Sunderland	2019–20	League One	5	0	1	0	3	0	2	0	11	0
Sunderland	2020–21	League One	41	0	0	0	1	0	4 (Note: Two appearances in the EFL Trophy and two appearances in the play-offs)	0	46	0
Sunderland	2021–22	League One	3	0	1	0	3	0	2	0	9	0
Sunderland	Total		49	0	2	0	7	0	8	0	66	0
Northampton Town	2022–23	League Two	38	0	1	0	0	0	0	0	39	0
Northampton Town	2023–24	League One	20	0	0	0	0	0	0	0	20	0
Northampton Town	2024–25	League One	30	0	0	0	0	0	0	0	30	0
Northampton Town	2025–26	League One	20	0	0	0	0	0	4	0	24	0
Northampton Town	Total		108	0	1	0	0	0	4	0	113	0
Career total			314	0	13	0	8	0	21	0	357	0

== Honours ==
Coventry City

- EFL League Two play-offs: 2018
- EFL Trophy: 2016–17

Sunderland

- EFL Trophy: 2020–21

Northampton Town

- EFL League Two third-place promotion: 2022–23

Individual

- EFL League One Team of the Season: 2020–21
