= Chris Camwell =

English footballer

Personal information
- Full name: Christopher Paul Camwell
- Date of birth: 27 October 1998 (age 28)
- Place of birth: Bedworth, England
- Height: 1.85 m (6 ft 1 in)
- Position: Winger

Team information
- Current team: Barwell

Youth career
- –2017: Coventry City

Senior career*
Years	Team	Apps	(Gls)
2017–2019	Coventry City	1	(0)
2017	→ Solihull Moors (loan)	1	(0)
2019	Nuneaton Borough	4	(1)
2019–2020	Coventry United	18	(9)
2020–2021	Hereford	8	(2)
2021	Coventry United		
2021	Hinckley A.F.C.	5	(3)
2021–2022	Bedworth United		
2022	Quorn		
2022	Barwell	1	(0)
- * Club domestic league appearances and goals as of 20:00, 8 August 2022 (UTC)

Christopher Paul Camwell is an English footballer

== Playing career ==
=== Coventry City ===
Camwell played for Coventry City since joining their Under 9 academy team. He made his first team debut on 30 April 2017, playing 90 minutes in a 3–1 loss to Scunthorpe United.

=== Coventry United ===
Camwell joined Coventry United on 20 September 2019, and made his debut five days later scoring in a 6-0 demolition of Selston.

=== Hereford ===
On 23 September 2020, Camwell signed for Hereford in the National League North. On 22 May 2021, Camwell was part of the Hereford team that were defeated by Hornchurch in the 2021 FA Trophy Final at Wembley Stadium. On 2 June 2021, he was released.

=== Hinckley A.F.C. ===
On 16 October 2021, United Counties League Division One side Hinckley A.F.C. announced the signing of Camwell from Coventry United. Chris made his debut for Hinckley A.F.C. on 17 October 2021, in a United Counties League Division One home fixture against Holwell Sports, with the home team winning the match 4–0. Camwell departed the club on 13 November 2021. He made five appearances and scored three goals whilst at the club.

=== Bedworth United ===
On 13 November 2021 Camwell signed for Bedworth United in the Northern Premier League,

=== Quorn ===
Camwell left Bedworth United on 11 January 2022, and signed for United Counties League Premier Division North side Quorn.

=== Barwell ===
Camwell signed for Southern League Premier Division Central side Barwell on 3 August 2022. He made his debut for Barwell on 6 August 2022 in a Southern League Premier Division Central fixture at home to Hitchin Town, with the player being substituted one minute before half time for Deen Master, following a red card for teammate Kyle Rowley. The match finished 2–1 to the visitors.

== Career statistics ==
As of match played 6 August 2022

Appearances and goals by club, season and competition
Club	Season	League			FA Cup		League Cup		Other		Total	
Club	Season	Division	Apps	Goals	Apps	Goals	Apps	Goals	Apps	Goals	Apps	Goals
Coventry City	2016–17	League One	1	0	0	0	0	0	0	0	1	0
Coventry City	2017–18	League Two	0	0	0	0	1	0	1 (Note: Appearance(s) in the EFL Trophy)	0	2	0
Coventry City	2018–19	League One	0	0	0	0	0	0	2	0	2	0
Coventry City	Coventry total		1	0	0	0	1	0	3	0	5	0
Solihull Moors (loan)	2017–18	National League	16	0	3	0	–		0	0	19	0
Nuneaton Borough	2019–20	Southern League Premier Division Central	4	0	0	0	—		0	0	4	0
Coventry United	2019–20	United Counties League	18	9	0	0	–		0	0	18	9
Hereford	2020–21	National League North	8	2	0	0	–		7 (Note: Appearance(s) in the FA Trophy)	1	15	3
Hinckley A.F.C.	2021–22	United Counties League Division One	5	3	0	0	—		0	0	5	3
Barwell	2022–23	Southern League Premier Division Central	1	0	0	0	—		0	0	1	0
Career total			53	14	3	0	1	0	10	1	67	15

== Honours ==
Hereford FA Trophy: 2020–21 Runner-Up
