= Jordon Thompson =

English footballer (born 1999)

Personal information
- Full name: Jordon Thompson
- Date of birth: 8 April 1999 (age 27)
- Place of birth: Islington, England
- Position: Centre-back

Team information
- Current team: Weymouth

Youth career
- –2015: Queens Park Rangers
- 2015–2017: Coventry City

Senior career*
Years	Team	Apps	(Gls)
2017–2021	Coventry City	6	(0)
2017	→ Barrow (loan)	8	(0)
2019	→ Boreham Wood (loan)	8	(0)
2020	→ Wrexham (loan)	5	(0)
2021	→ Solihull Moors (loan)	8	(1)
2021–2022	Gloucester City	28	(4)
2022–2023	Hereford	9	(0)
2023–2025	Weymouth	76	(4)
2025	Hemel Hempstead Town FC	12	(0)
- * Club domestic league appearances and goals

Jordon Thompson (born 8 April 1999) is an English professional footballer who plays as a defender for National League South club Tonbridge Angels F.C.

== Career ==
In March 2017, Thompson was rewarded with a professional contract at Coventry City. During the second year of his scholarship Thompson was part of the team that won the U18 PL2 South keeping 12 clean sheets in a row. As a reward for his fine form, Thompson broke into the first team squad for the League Two Playoff Final at Wembley Stadium.

He joined National League side Barrow in September 2017 on a one-month loan deal.

Thompson was recalled from Barrow and soon after made his professional debut in the EFL Trophy 2–1 win over West Bromwich Albion U21s on 7 November 2017.

On 31 January 2020, Thompson signed with Wrexham, on an initial 28-day loan from Coventry City. Thompson enjoyed a consistent run of games at the Racecourse which saw the club stay clear of the relegation spots before the season was curtailed.

In April 2021, Jordon joined National League side Solihull Moors on loan until 31 May 2021. Thompson was part of a defence which kept five clean sheets in eight games which saw the Moors narrowly miss out on the playoffs.

On 12 May 2021 it was announced that he would leave Coventry at the end of the season, following the expiry of his contract.

On 11 September 2021, Thompson signed a one-year deal with Gloucester City. On 11 March 2022, after a prolonged spell of good form at both centre back and right back, Thompson was awarded the club's player of the month award. He went on to make 28 league appearances for Gloucester City, scoring four goals, attracting strong interest from multiple National League clubs.

After leaving Gloucester City despite being offered a new contract, Thompson signed with National League North side Hereford on 24 September 2022 and made his debut that same day in a 3-0 league win at home to Blyth Spartans.

On 25 July 2023, Thompson signed for National League South club Weymouth. During his second season at the club, Jordon was awarded the manager's, players' and fans' player of the season awards, attracting interest from a number of clubs in England and Ireland. On 6 June 2025, Thompson signed for National League South side Hemel Hemsptead Town FC. After a short spell, Thompson transferred to Tonbridge Angels F.C in January 2026.

== Career statistics ==
As of match played 11 January 2025

Appearances and goals by club, season and competition
Club	Season	League			FA Cup		League Cup		Other		Total	
Club	Season	Division	Apps	Goals	Apps	Goals	Apps	Goals	Apps	Goals	Apps	Goals
Coventry City	2017–18	League Two	0	0	0	0	0	0	1 (Note: Appearances in EFL Trophy)	0	1	0
Coventry City	2018–19	League One	4	0	1	0	0	0	3	0	8	0
Coventry City	2019–20	League One	0	0	0	0	0	0	0	0	0	0
Coventry City	2020–21	Championship	2	0	0	0	1	0	0	0	3	0
Coventry City	Total		6	0	1	0	1	0	4	0	12	0
Barrow (loan)	2017–18	National League	8	0	1	0	—		0	0	9	0
Boreham Wood (loan)	2019–20	National League	8	0	0	0	—		0	0	8	0
Wrexham (loan)	2019–20	National League	5	0	0	0	—		0	0	5	0
Solihull Moors (loan)	2020–21	National League	8	1	0	0	—		0	0	8	1
Gloucester City	2021–22	National League North	28	4	2	0	—		0	0	30	4
Hereford	2022–23	National League North	9	0	1	0	—		1 (Note: Appearance(s) in FA Trophy)	0	11	0
Cheshunt	2022–23	National League South	3	0	—		—		1 (Note: Appearance(s) in Herts Senior Cup)	0	4	0
Weymouth	2023–24	National League South	33	0	1	0	—		1	0	14	0
Weymouth	2024–25	National League South	25	2	1	0	—		3	0	26	2
Weymouth	Total		58	2	2	0	0	0	4	0	40	2
Career total			133	7	7	0	1	0	10	0	127	7

== Honours ==
Coventry City

- EFL League Two play-offs: 2018
