= Jordan Ponticelli =

English footballer

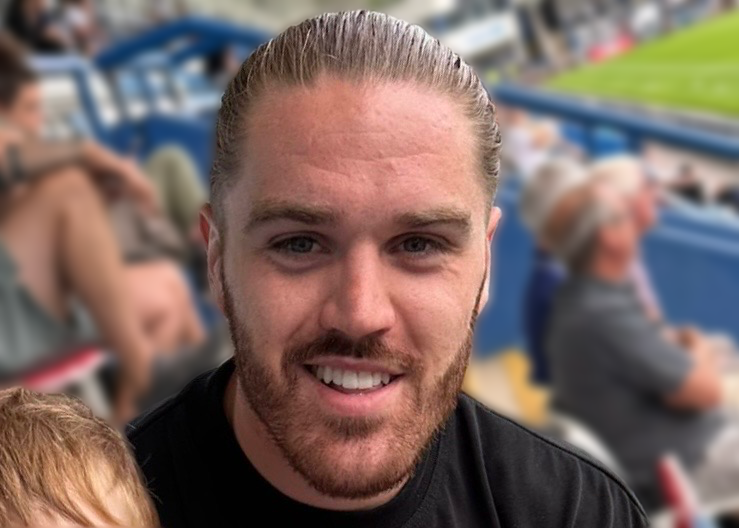

Personal information
- Full name: Jordan Ponticelli
- Date of birth: 10 September 1998 (age 28)
- Place of birth: Nuneaton, England
- Height: 1.80 m (5 ft 11 in)
- Position: Forward

Team information
- Current team: Tamworth
- Number: 38

Youth career
- Hinckley Leicester Road
- –2017: Coventry City

Senior career*
Years	Team	Apps	(Gls)
2017–2020	Coventry City	24	(3)
2018–2019	→ Macclesfield Town (loan)	3	(0)
2019–2020	→ Tranmere Rovers (loan)	1	(0)
2020	→ Wrexham (loan)	5	(2)
2020–2022	Wrexham	55	(6)
2022–2024	King's Lynn Town	42	(8)
2024	Halesowen Town	10	(8)
2024–	Tamworth	15	(2)
- * Club domestic league appearances and goals as of 02:57, 14 December 2024 (UTC)

Jordan Ponticelli (born 10 September 1998) is an English professional footballer who plays as a forward for Real Bedford

== Career ==
Ponticelli began his career for Hinckley Leicester Road.

Ponticelli made his professional debut in a 3–1 EFL Cup loss to Blackburn Rovers on 8 August 2017.

Ponticelli made his Football League debut as a substitute in the 85th minute of a 0–0 draw against Barnet on 7 October 2017.

In August 2018, Jordan joined EFL League Two side Macclesfield Town on a season-long loan deal. The loan was terminated in January 2019.

On 10 July 2019, Ponticelli went out on loan again, this time joining League One club Tranmere Rovers on a six-month loan deal.

Ponticelli dropped down two divisions for his next loan, signing for National League club Wrexham on 22 January 2020 until the end of the 2019–20 season. Ponticelli joined Wrexham in a permanent deal in August 2020. Ponticelli was released at the end of the 2021–22 season.

In July 2022, Ponticelli joined National League North club King's Lynn Town following their relegation.

Ponticelli was released from King's Lynn Town at the end of the 2023–24 season.

In September 2024, Ponticelli joined Southern League Premier Division club Halesowen Town

On December 13 2024, Ponticelli signed for National League club Tamworth.

On February 26 2026, Ponticelli joined Halesowen Town F.C. of the Southern League on loan.

== Career statistics ==
As of match played 15 August 2023

Appearances and goals by club, season and competition
Club	Season	League			FA Cup		League Cup		Other		Total	
Club	Season	Division	Apps	Goals	Apps	Goals	Apps	Goals	Apps	Goals	Apps	Goals
Coventry City	2017–18	League Two	19	3	2	2	1	0	4 (Note: One appearance and one goal in EFL Trophy, three appearances in League Two play-offs)	1	26	6
Coventry City	2018–19	League One	5	0	0	0	1	0	0	0	6	0
Coventry City	Total		24	3	2	2	2	0	4	1	32	6
Macclesfield Town (loan)	2018–19	League Two	3	0	—		—		1 (Note: Appearance(s) in the EFL Trophy)	0	4	0
Tranmere Rovers (loan)	2019–20	League One	1	0	0	0	1	0	1	0	3	0
Wrexham (loan)	2019–20	National League	5	2	—		—		0	0	5	2
Wrexham	2020–21	National League	28	4	0	0	—		0	0	28	4
Wrexham	2021–22	National League	27	2	3	1	—		3 (Note: Appearance(s) in FA Trophy)	2	33	5
Wrexham	Total		60	8	3	1	0	0	3	2	66	11
King's Lynn Town	2022–23	National League North	39	6	3	1	—		0	0	42	7
King's Lynn Town	2023–24	National League North	3	2	0	0	—		0	0	3	2
King's Lynn Town	Total		42	8	3	1	—		0	0	45	9
Career total			126	19	8	4	3	0	9	3	143	26

== Honours ==
Coventry City

- EFL League Two play-offs: 2018

Wrexham

- FA Trophy runner-up: 2021–22
