= Chris Stokes (footballer) =

English footballer (born 1991)

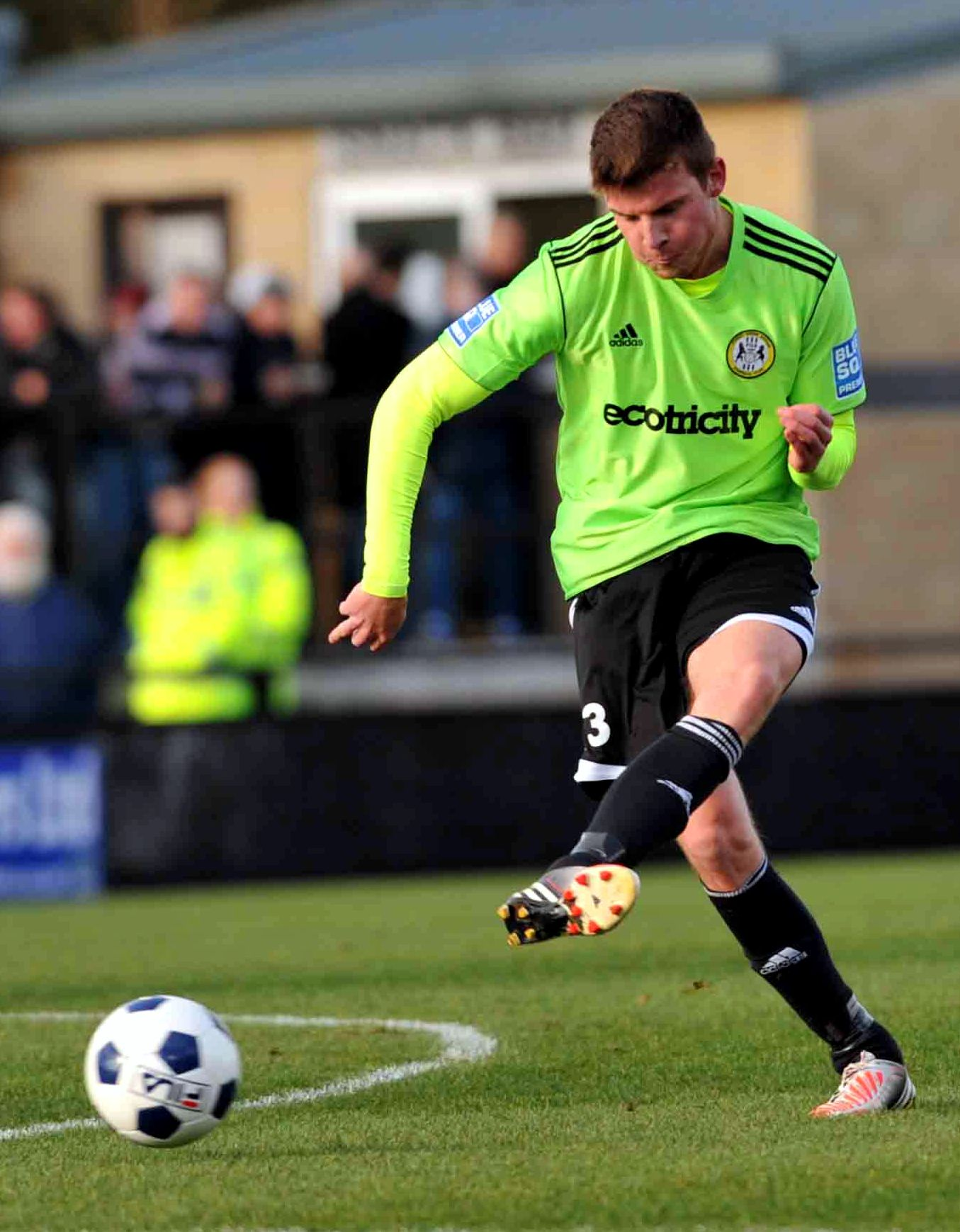

Personal information
- Full name: Christopher Martin Thomas Stokes
- Date of birth: 8 March 1991 (age 35)
- Place of birth: Frome, England
- Height: 6 ft 1 in (1.85 m)
- Position: Defender

Team information
- Current team: AFC Fylde
- Number: 16

Youth career
- 2005–2009: Bolton Wanderers

Senior career*
Years	Team	Apps	(Gls)
2009–2010	Bolton Wanderers	0	(0)
2010	→ Crewe Alexandra (loan)	2	(0)
2010–2015	Forest Green Rovers	133	(7)
2015	→ Coventry City (loan)	16	(1)
2015–2018	Coventry City	79	(2)
2018–2019	Bury	41	(4)
2019–2020	Stevenage	25	(0)
2020–2021	Forest Green Rovers	39	(2)
2021–2023	Kilmarnock	37	(4)
2023–2024	Morecambe	24	(2)
2024–2025	Barrow	13	(0)
2025–	AFC Fylde	6	(0)

International career
2007	England U17	6	(0)
2013	England C	1	(0)
- * Club domestic league appearances and goals as of 16:00, 6 January 2025 (UTC)

Christopher Martin Thomas Stokes (born 8 March 1991) is an English professional footballer who plays as a centre-back or full-back for National League club AFC Fylde.

== Club career ==
=== Early career ===
Stokes played for Southampton and Bristol City youth teams before joining Bolton Wanderers at the age of 14 for an undisclosed fee.

=== Bolton Wanderers ===
He captained the Wanderers at youth level during their successful run to the Youth Cup quarter finals in the 2008–09 season, scoring a penalty against Liverpool at Anfield and was a regular in Bolton's reserve team.

==== Crewe Alexandra (loan) ====
On 12 March 2010, he signed for Crewe Alexandra on a one-month loan deal, making his debut two days later in a 1–1 draw with Torquay United and played 90 minutes.

On 11 May 2010, Stokes was released by Bolton Wanderers following the expiry of his contract. On 21 July 2010, Stokes opted to quit his trial period at Crewe to take up a similar opportunity at Walsall, however was not offered a contract by Saddlers manager Chris Hutchings.

=== Forest Green Rovers ===
Stokes played for Conference club Forest Green Rovers' reserve team as part of a trial, On 11 November 2010, he signed for Forest Green, initially on a non-contract basis.

It took until 19 February 2011 for Stokes to make his Forest Green debut in a 1–1 home draw against Darlington. After impressing in his first few months at Forest Green, Stokes was offered a new contract for the 2011–12 season.

On 24 August 2011 it was announced that Stokes had been included in the England C Squad to face the India national under-23 football team side on 6 September.

Despite scoring his first goal for the club in a pre season friendly with Hellenic Premier Division side Slimbridge in August 2011, Stokes scored his first league goal for Forest Green in a 3–0 win over Bath City on 29 August 2011.

In January 2012, he signed an extension to his contract at Forest Green which would keep him at The New Lawn until the end of the 2013–14 season. On 21 April 2012 it was announced at the final home game of the 2011–2012 season that Chris has been voted Supporters player of the season by the Forest Green Rovers fans. On 6 December 2012, Stokes signed a further extension to his contract at Forest Green, keeping him at the club until June 2015. At the end of the 2012–13 season Stokes earned a call up to the England C squad for a forthcoming international with Bermuda.

He made his hundredth Conference league appearance for Forest Green on 26 August 2013 in an away win over Chester.

In January 2015, it was reported that he had been allowed by Forest Green to train with League One side Yeovil Town. It was revealed a week later though that he would not be moving to Yeovil. He then began training with fellow League One side Coventry City in February 2015.

==== Coventry City (loan) ====
On 21 February 2015, Stokes signed a 28-day loan deal at Coventry City. He made his debut on the same day in a 2–2 draw against Sheffield United.

In only his second game for Coventry, he scored a header against league leaders MK Dons to help Coventry to secure their first home win since October 2014, and to help them climb out of the relegation zone. He impressed making it into the Football League team of the week. After impressing in his first seven games for Coventry, his loan was extended to the end of the 2014–15 season.

He helped Coventry retain their League One status before the completion of his loan. On 4 May 2015, it was confirmed that he had been released by parent club Forest Green Rovers at the end of his contract.

=== Coventry City ===
On 30 June 2015, Stokes signed a one-year contract with Coventry City.

=== Bury ===
After three years at Coventry in which he helped the club to promotion and the 2016–17 EFL Trophy, he joined Bury on a free transfer on 16 July 2018, signing a two-year contract with the Shakers.

Stokes helped Bury secure promotion to league 1 finishing 2nd in the league 2 table during the 2018-2019 season, making it back to back league 1 promotion for Stokes.

=== Stevenage ===
Stokes left Bury on 2 July 2019 to join Stevenage.

During his short spell at Stevenage Stokes helped keep 11 clean sheets in the 30 games he started.

=== Forest Green Rovers (2nd spell) ===
On 31 January 2020, Stokes re-joined Forest Green Rovers on a short-term deal.

Stokes' slotted straight into the team starting every league game before the season came to a premature end due to the global pandemic COVID-19 in March 2020, this was following an impressive display away at Swindon where Forest Green toppled the league two leaders, coming away with a deserved 0-2 victory and Stokes earning Man of the Match. He was released by Forest Green at the end of the 2020-21 season.

=== Kilmarnock ===
In June 2021, Stokes signed a two-year contract with Scottish Championship side Kilmarnock. Stokes won promotion to the Scottish premier league as captain.

=== Morecambe ===
Following his release from Kilmarnock, Stokes returned to England, signing for Morecambe in June 2023.

=== Barrow ===
On 5 August 2024, Stokes joined League Two side Barrow on an initial five-month deal.

=== AFC Fylde ===
On 10 January 2025, Stokes joined National League side AFC Fylde on a short-term deal until the end of the season with an option to extend.

== International career ==
Stokes was capped by England at under-17 level.

== Career statistics ==
As of match played 29 December 2024

Appearances and goals by club, season and competition
Club	Season	League			FA Cup		League Cup		Other		Total	
Club	Season	Division	Apps	Goals	Apps	Goals	Apps	Goals	Apps	Goals	Apps	Goals
Bolton Wanderers	2009–10	Premier League	0	0	0	0	0	0	—		0	0
Crewe Alexandra (loan)	2009–10	League Two	2	0	—		—		—		2	0
Forest Green Rovers	2010–11	Conference	14	0	—		—		—		14	0
Forest Green Rovers	2011–12	Conference	45	2	1	0	—		2 (Note: Appearances in FA Trophy.)	0	48	2
Forest Green Rovers	2012–13	Conference	36	4	2	1	—		2	0	40	5
Forest Green Rovers	2013–14	Conference	20	0	1	0	—		0	0	21	0
Forest Green Rovers	2014–15	Conference	18	1	0	0	—		3	0	21	1
Forest Green Rovers	Total		133	7	4	1	—		7	0	144	8
Coventry City (loan)	2014–15	League One	16	1	—		—		—		16	1
Coventry City	2015–16	League One	36	2	1	0	1	0	0	0	38	2
Coventry City	2016–17	League One	7	0	0	0	0	0	2 (Note: Appearances in EFL Trophy.)	0	9	0
Coventry City	2017–18	League Two	30	0	2	0	0	0	3 (Note: One appearance in EFL Trophy; two in EFL League Two play-offs.)	0	35	0
Coventry City	Total		89	3	3	0	1	0	5	0	98	3
Bury	2018–19	League Two	37	4	2	0	1	0	3	0	43	4
Stevenage	2019–20	League Two	25	0	2	0	0	0	3	0	30	0
Forest Green Rovers	2019–20	League Two	5	0	0	0	0	0	0	0	5	0
Forest Green Rovers	2020–21	League Two	29	2	0	0	1	0	2	1	32	3
Forest Green Rovers	Total		34	2	0	0	1	0	2	1	37	3
Kilmarnock	2021–22	Scottish Championship	19	2	1	0	5	0	2	0	27	2
Kilmarnock	2022–23	Scottish Premiership	15	2	1	0	1	0	0	0	17	2
Kilmarnock	Total		34	4	2	0	6	0	2	0	44	4
Morecambe	2023–24	League Two	24	2	1	0	0	0	2	0	27	2
Barrow	2024–25	League Two	13	0	0	0	1	0	1	0	15	0
Career total			391	22	14	1	10	0	25	1	440	24

== Honours ==
Coventry City

- EFL League Two play-offs: 2018
- EFL Trophy: 2016–17

Bury

- EFL League Two second-place promotion: 2018–19

Kilmarnock

- Scottish Championship: 2021–22
