= James Pearson (footballer, born 1993) =

English footballer (born 1993)

Personal information
- Full name: James Pearson
- Date of birth: 19 January 1993 (age 33)
- Place of birth: Sheffield, England
- Height: 6 ft 1 in (1.86 m)
- Position: Defender

Youth career
- ?–2009: Rotherham United

Senior career*
| Years | Team | Apps | (Gls) |
| 2012–2015 | Leicester City | 0 | (0) |
| 2014 | → Carlisle United (loan) | 3 | (0) |
| 2014 | → Wrexham (loan) | 5 | (0) |
| 2015 | → Peterborough United (loan) | 0 | (0) |
| 2016–2017 | Barnet | 15 | (0) |
| 2017 | Coventry City | 0 | (0) |
| 2017–2018 | Kidderminster Harriers | 23 | (1) |
| 2018–2020 | Macclesfield Town | 23 | (1) |
| Total | | 69 | (2) |
- * Club domestic league appearances and goals

James Pearson (born 19 January 1993) is an English former professional footballer who played as a defender.

== Early life ==
Pearson is the son of Nigel Pearson, a former Sheffield Wednesday and Middlesbrough defender, who has later managed teams such as Hull City and Leicester City. James still resides in Sheffield where he was born while his father was playing for Sheffield Wednesday. He attended Westbourne School in Sheffield, and Hartpury College in Gloucestershire.

== Career ==
=== Early career ===
Pearson's youth career began at Rotherham United. He was released from the club in the summer of 2009.

=== Leicester City ===
On 19 September 2012, Pearson joined, on a 12-month contract, Football League Championship side Leicester City, who were then managed by his father Nigel, the season before they returned to the Premier League after a ten-year absence.

On 11 March 2014, James Pearson joined League One club Carlisle United on loan for the rest of the 2014–15 season, along with Watford's Reece Brown. The next day, he made his professional debut, playing the full 90 minutes in a 1–0 defeat at Sheffield United. He went on to represent Carlisle in a draw against Stevenage and a loss to Notts County, before returning to Leicester, where he extended his contract by one more year on 2 June.

On 26 August 2014, Pearson made his Leicester City debut, along with Ryan Watson and Michael Cain, in the 1–0 League Cup second round home defeat to League Two Shrewsbury Town, playing the whole match.

On 27 October, Pearson joined Conference Premier side Wrexham on a month-long loan, eventually extended into January 2015. He played five league games for Wrexham, in addition to two FA Trophy games and three rounds of the FA Cup, ending with a 3–1 defeat at top-flight Stoke City in the third round on 4 January.

In March 2015, Pearson joined Peterborough United on loan until the end of the 2014/15 season. He did not make an appearance for the club.

On 17 June 2015, Pearson's contract was terminated by Leicester City following a racist orgy during the club's promotional tour in Thailand.

=== Later career ===
Following his departure from Leicester, Pearson trained with his former club Rotherham, before joining Barnet on 2 February 2016, "on a non-contract basis". In March 2016, he signed a contract to keep him at the club until summer 2017. Pearson suffered a knee injury in 2016–17 pre-season which kept him out for the entirety of the campaign. He was released at the end of the season.

Pearson joined Coventry City on a non-contract basis on 4 August 2017. He was released on 30 August having made no appearances.

In September 2017, he joined Kidderminster Harriers on a deal until the end of the season

In July 2018, Pearson joined newly promoted Macclesfield Town on a one-year deal.

In October 2020, Pearson revealed in an interview with The Guardian that he had retired from football due to injury.

== Controversy ==
In May 2015, during a promotional tour of Asia, Pearson and teammates Tom Hopper and Adam Smith, took part in a racist sex tape filmed on the club's end-of-season tour of Thailand", a copy of which was obtained and published by the Sunday Mirror. According to the media reports, "One of the men in the video ... can be heard using a racist insult against a woman." The three players apologised for their behaviour. All three were sacked on 17 June. In relation to the tape, Nigel Pearson too was sacked as Leicester manager by the club's Thai owners, on 30 June 2015.

== Career statistics ==
Appearances and goals by club, season and competition
| Club | Season | League | | | FA Cup | | League Cup | | Other | | Total | |
| Club | Season | Division | Apps | Goals | Apps | Goals | Apps | Goals | Apps | Goals | Apps | Goals |
|---|---|---|---|---|---|---|---|---|---|---|---|---|
| Leicester City | 2013–14 | Championship | 0 | 0 | 0 | 0 | 0 | 0 | — | | 0 | 0 |
| Leicester City | 2014–15 | Premier League | 0 | 0 | 0 | 0 | 1 | 0 | — | | 1 | 0 |
| Leicester City | Total | | 0 | 0 | 0 | 0 | 1 | 0 | 0 | 0 | 1 | 0 |
| Carlisle United (loan) | 2013–14 | League One | 3 | 0 | 0 | 0 | 0 | 0 | 0 | 0 | 3 | 0 |
| Wrexham (loan) | 2014–15 | Conference Premier | 5 | 0 | 3 | 0 | — | | 2 (Note: Appearances in FA Trophy) | 0 | 10 | 0 |
| Barnet | 2015–16 | League Two | 15 | 0 | 0 | 0 | 0 | 0 | 0 | 0 | 15 | 0 |
| Barnet | 2016–17 | League Two | 0 | 0 | 0 | 0 | 0 | 0 | 0 | 0 | 0 | 0 |
| Barnet | Total | | 15 | 0 | 0 | 0 | 0 | 0 | 0 | 0 | 15 | 0 |
| Coventry City | 2017–18 | League Two | 0 | 0 | 0 | 0 | 0 | 0 | 1 (Note: Appearance(s) in EFL Trophy) | 0 | 1 | 0 |
| Kidderminster Harriers | 2017–18 | National League North | 23 | 1 | 2 | 0 | — | | 3 | 0 | 28 | 1 |
| Macclesfield Town | 2018–19 | League Two | 23 | 1 | 0 | 0 | 2 | 0 | 3 | 0 | 28 | 1 |
| Macclesfield Town | 2019–20 | League Two | 0 | 0 | 0 | 0 | 0 | 0 | 0 | 0 | 0 | 0 |
| Career total | | | 69 | 2 | 5 | 0 | 3 | 0 | 9 | 0 | 86 | 2 |
