= Rod McDonald (footballer, born 1992) =

English footballer (born 1992)

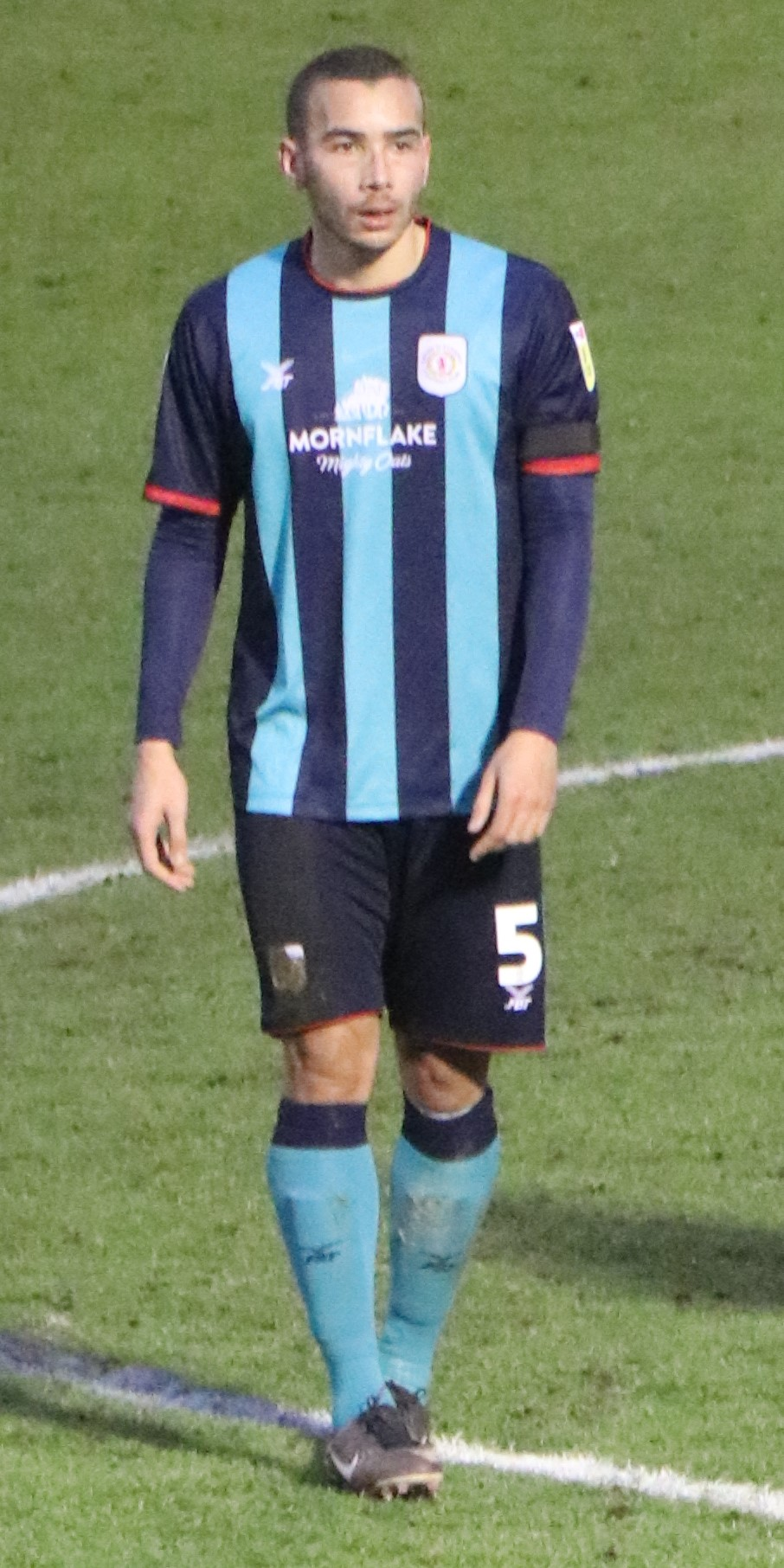
- McDonald playing for Crewe Alexandra in 2023

Personal information
- Full name: Rodney Troy McDonald
- Date of birth: 11 April 1992 (age 34)
- Place of birth: Liverpool, England
- Height: 6 ft 3 in (1.91 m)
- Position: Defender

Team information
- Current team: Notts County
- Number: 3

Youth career
- 2003–2005: Manchester City
- 2005–2009: Stoke City

Senior career*
Years	Team	Apps	(Gls)
2009–2010	Stoke City	0	(0)
2009	→ Nantwich Town (loan)	1	(0)
2010–2011	Oldham Athletic	0	(0)
2010	→ Stafford Rangers (loan)	3	(0)
2011	→ Nantwich Town (loan)	14	(0)
2011	Colwyn Bay	15	(0)
2011–2013	Nantwich Town	44	(1)
2013–2014	Hereford United	48	(4)
2014–2015	AFC Telford United	22	(2)
2015–2017	Northampton Town	30	(3)
2017–2018	Coventry City	37	(0)
2018–2020	AFC Wimbledon	38	(0)
2020–2022	Carlisle United	60	(1)
2022–2023	Crewe Alexandra	33	(2)
2023–2024	Harrogate Town	23	(0)
2024–	Notts County	44	(0)
- * Club domestic league appearances and goals as of 18:25 8 July 2026 (UTC)

Rodney Troy McDonald (born 11 April 1992) is an English professional footballer who plays as a defender for EFL League One club Notts County.

== Career ==
=== Stoke City ===
McDonald joined Stoke City's academy from Manchester City's academy in 2005. He became a regular in the club's youth and reserves side but was released in the summer of 2010. In October 2009 he joined Nantwich Town on loan to gain some first team experience. However Stoke recalled McDonald after just one substitute appearance after academy manager Adrian Pennock wanted him to start on his debut.

=== Oldham Athletic ===
McDonald signed for Oldham Athletic in early August 2010 after impressing in a series of trial games at the club. He made his debut on 31 August 2010 in a Football League Trophy match against Shrewsbury Town as a 45th-minute substitute.

On 29 October 2010 he joined Stafford Rangers for a month-long loan period to gain some first team experience. He returned to Oldham at the end of November having made four appearances whilst on loan, including three league matches.

On 22 February 2011, McDonald joined Northern Premier club Nantwich Town on a month-long loan deal. The loan was extended on 24 March until the end of the season.

At the end of the season he was informed by Oldham that he was out of contract and would not be offered a new deal.

=== Colwyn Bay ===
In July 2011, McDonald agreed to join Colwyn Bay.

=== Nantwich Town ===
In late 2011 he rejoined his former loan club, for the third time, this time on a permanent deal.

=== Hereford United ===
On 28 January 2013, McDonald joined Hereford United on a contract lasting until the end of the season.

After impressing Hereford manager Martin Foyle, McDonald signed a new one-year contract on 11 June 2013.

=== AFC Telford United ===
Following Hereford's relegation from the Conference Premier Division, McDonald departed the club and signed for AFC Telford United, following Martin Foyle in joining the Bucks.

=== Northampton Town ===
After leaving Telford, McDonald joined Northampton Town on a trial, and impressed manager Chris Wilder enough to earn a 12-month contract with the Cobblers. McDonald made his debut for Northampton in a 3–0 win over Exeter City on 15 August 2015, as a substitute for Zander Diamond. He eventually established himself as a regular starter in the side as they went on to win the 2015/16 League Two title, signing a new contract with the club until the summer of 2018 in February 2016.

Following Chris Wilder's departure as Northampton Town manager in May 2016, McDonald struggled to establish in the side during the following season in League One, making just nine appearances in all competitions during the 2016/17 season. At the end of the campaign, McDonald was transfer-listed by manager Justin Edinburgh, alongside three other players.

=== Coventry City ===
On 19 May 2017, McDonald was signed by Coventry City on a two-year contract for an undisclosed fee. McDonald made his debut for the Sky Blues in a 3–0 victory over Notts County on the opening day of the 2017–18 League Two season.

=== AFC Wimbledon ===
On 2 August 2018, McDonald joined League One side AFC Wimbledon for an undisclosed fee.

=== Carlisle United ===
On 3 August 2020, McDonald joined Carlisle United on a two-year deal. He was released by the club at the end of the 2021–22 season.

=== Crewe Alexandra ===
On 27 June 2022, McDonald agreed to join Crewe Alexandra upon the expiration of his Carlisle United contract. He started in Crewe's opening game of the 2022–23 season, a 2–1 victory over Rochdale at Spotland on 30 July 2022. Five weeks later, on 3 September 2023, he scored his first Crewe goal in a 2–1 League Two defeat by Stevenage at Gresty Road. At the end of the season, he was offered a new contract by the club.

=== Harrogate Town ===
On 9 June 2023, it was announced that McDonald had declined the contract extension from Crewe Alexandra, in order to sign for Harrogate Town upon expiry of his contract. He made his Harrogate debut in the club's opening game of the season, a 1–0 win at Doncaster on 5 August 2023, and scored his first Harrogate goal on 4 November 2023, in Harrogate's 5–1 FA Cup first round win at Marine.

=== Notts County ===
On 24 June 2024, McDonald signed for fellow League Two side Notts County on a two-year deal for an undisclosed fee.

== Personal life ==
His father, Rodney, was a professional footballer for Walsall as well as many other clubs, as is his older brother Clayton.

== Career statistics ==
As of matches played 8 March 2025

Appearances and goals by club, season and competition
Club	Season	League			FA Cup		League Cup		Other		Total	
Club	Season	Division	Apps	Goals	Apps	Goals	Apps	Goals	Apps	Goals	Apps	Goals
Oldham Athletic	2010–11	League One	0	0	0	0	0	0	1 (Note: Appearances in Football League Trophy)	0	1	0
Stafford Rangers (loan)	2010–11	National League North	3	0	0	0	~	~	0	0	3	0
Colwyn Bay	2011–12	National League North	15	0	0	0	~	~	0	0	15	0
Hereford United	2012–13	Conference Premier	11	2	0	0	~	~	0	0	11	2
Hereford United	2013–14	Conference Premier	37	2	2	0	~	~	1 (Note: Appearances in FA Trophy)	0	40	2
Hereford United	Total		48	4	2	0	~	~	1	0	51	4
AFC Telford United	2014–15	Conference Premier	22	2	5	1	~	~	1	0	28	3
Northampton Town	2015–16	League Two	23	3	3	0	1	0	1	0	28	3
Northampton Town	2016–17	League One	7	0	0	0	0	0	2 (Note: Appearance(s) in EFL Trophy)	0	9	0
Northampton Town	Total		30	3	3	0	1	0	3	0	37	3
Coventry City	2017–18	League Two	37	0	3	0	1	0	0	0	41	0
AFC Wimbledon	2018–19	League One	23	0	3	0	2	0	2	0	30	0
AFC Wimbledon	2019–20	League One	15	0	0	0	1	0	0	0	16	0
AFC Wimbledon	Total		38	0	3	0	3	0	2	0	46	0
Carlisle United	2020–21	League Two	29	0	0	0	1	0	1	0	31	0
Carlisle United	2021–22	League Two	31	1	2	0	0	0	2	0	35	1
Carlisle United	Total		60	1	2	0	1	0	3	0	66	1
Crewe Alexandra	2022–23	League Two	33	2	1	0	1	0	1	0	36	2
Harrogate Town	2023–24	League Two	23	0	1	1	1	0	2	0	27	1
Notts County	2024–25	League Two	19	0	2	0	0	0	3	0	17	0
Career total			328	12	22	2	8	0	24	0	375	14

== Honours ==
Northampton Town

- Football League Two: 2015–16

Coventry City

- EFL League Two play-offs: 2018

Notts County

- EFL League Two play-offs: 2026
