= Maxime Biamou =

French footballer (born 1990)

Personal information
- Full name: Maxime Gérard Biamou Ngapmou Yoke
- Date of birth: 13 November 1990 (age 35)
- Place of birth: Créteil, France
- Height: 1.85 m (6 ft 1 in)
- Position: Forward

Senior career*
Years	Team	Apps	(Gls)
2014–2015	Villemomble Sports	15	(3)
2015–2016	Yzeure	30	(6)
2016–2017	Sutton United	39	(10)
2017–2021	Coventry City	95	(14)
2021–2022	Dundee United	3	(0)
2024	Doncaster Rovers	7	(2)
- * Club domestic league appearances and goals as of 18 August 2024

Maxime Gérard Biamou Ngapmou Yoke (born 13 November 1990) is a French professional footballer who plays as a forward.

== Career ==
Born in Créteil, Biamou grew up in Bonneuil-sur-Marne and later trained at the CFFP in Paris. His early career was impacted by adductor injuries, and he played no football for three years while studying at university. He later played football locally in Bonneuil-sur-Marne before spending his early career in the French lower leagues with Villemomble Sports and Yzeure, later moving to England and joining Sutton United. He signed for Coventry City in June 2017. In August 2018 he suffered an anterior cruciate ligament injury, and was ruled out for a number of months. At the start of the 2019–20 season Coventry tried to play Biamou on the left wing; manager Mark Robins judged it unsuccessful and said he wouldn't be repeating it. In a post-match interview conducted after a 2–0 win against Southend United in February 2020, Biamou praised the club for his footballing development, saying "I am a completely different player since I came to Coventry".

On 12 May 2021 it was announced that he would leave Coventry at the end of the season, following the expiry of his contract.

In October 2021 he signed a short-term contract with Scottish club Dundee United.

On 28 February 2024, Biamou signed for Doncaster Rovers on a short-term contract. He was released at the end of the season.

== Personal life ==
Born in France, Biamou is of Cameroonian descent.

== Career statistics ==
As of match played 6 April 2024

Appearances and goals by club, season and competition
Club	Season	League			National cup		League cup		Other		Total	
Club	Season	Division	Apps	Goals	Apps	Goals	Apps	Goals	Apps	Goals	Apps	Goals
Villemomble Sports	2014–15	CFA2	15	3	0	0	0	0	0	0	15	3
Yzeure	2015–16	CFA	30	6	2	2	0	0	0	0	32	8
Sutton United	2016–17	National League	39	10	7	3	—	—	3 (Note: Appearances in the FA Trophy.)	0	49	13
Coventry City	2017–18	League Two	40	5	5	1	0	0	4 (Note: One appearance in the EFL Trophy and three appearances in the League Two play-offs.)	3	49	9
Coventry City	2018–19	League One	4	0	0	0	1	0	0	0	5	0
Coventry City	2019–20	League One	18	4	5	4	0	0	3 (Note: Appearances in the EFL Trophy)	3	26	11
Coventry City	2020–21	Championship	33	5	1	0	1	1	—		35	6
Coventry City	Total		95	14	11	5	2	1	7	6	115	26
Dundee United	2021–22	Scottish Premiership	3	0	0	0	0	0	0	0	3	0
Doncaster Rovers	2023–24	League Two	7	2	0	0	0	0	0	0	7	2
Career total			189	35	20	10	2	1	10	6	221	52

== Honours ==
Coventry City

- EFL League One: 2019–20
- EFL League Two play-offs: 2018
