= Tom Bayliss =

English footballer (born 1999)

Personal information
- Full name: Thomas David Bayliss
- Date of birth: 6 April 1999 (age 27)
- Place of birth: Leicester, England
- Height: 6 ft 0 in (1.83 m)
- Position: Midfielder

Team information
- Current team: Lincoln City
- Number: 8

Youth career
- –2017: Coventry City

Senior career*
Years	Team	Apps	(Gls)
2017–2019	Coventry City	62	(8)
2019–2022	Preston North End	12	(1)
2021–2022	→ Wigan Athletic (loan)	8	(0)
2022–2024	Shrewsbury Town	71	(9)
2024–	Lincoln City	88	(7)

International career
2018	England U19	2	(0)
- * Club domestic league appearances and goals as of 17:00, 21 November 2026 (UTC)

Thomas David Bayliss (born 6 April 1999) is an English professional footballer who plays as a midfielder for EFL Championship club Lincoln City.

== Club career ==
=== Coventry City ===
Bayliss made his professional debut for Coventry City as a substitute on 7 November 2017 in a 2–1 EFL Trophy win over West Bromwich Albion U23, coming on to replace Dion Kelly-Evans. He made his second appearance in the FA Cup second round against Boreham Wood. He made his league debut on 16 December, and scored within two minutes, as Coventry recorded a 2–1 victory over Cheltenham Town. He scored 6 goals for Coventry City during the 2017–18 season to help them gain promotion back to EFL League One.

=== Preston North End ===
Bayliss completed a move to Championship side Preston North End on 2 August 2019, signing a four-year deal for an undisclosed fee believed to be around £2 million as confirmed by Jack Daniels at the time.

==== Wigan Athletic (loan) ====
On 27 August 2021, Bayliss signed for EFL League One side Wigan Athletic on a season-long loan.

=== Shrewsbury Town ===
On 27 June 2022, Bayliss joined Shrewsbury Town on a two-year deal with the option for a further year after Preston had agreed to terminate his contract.

He was released by Shrewsbury at the end of the 2023–24 season.

=== Lincoln City ===
On 21 June 2024, Lincoln City confirmed Bayliss would sign for them on 1 July 2024. He made his debut on 10 August, in a 3–2 win against Burton Albion where he started the game. He scored his first goal for the club against Peterborough United on 25 January 2025. After a promosing debut season, he signed a new three-year contract in July 2025 keeping him at the club until the summer of 2028.

== International career ==
On 16 July 2018, Bayliss was called up to the England U19 squad for the 2018 UEFA European Under-19 Championship. Bayliss made his International debut as a substitute against France and then recorded his first start in a defeat against Norway.

== Career statistics ==
As of 21 November 2026

Appearances and goals by club, season and competition
Club	Season	League			FA Cup		League Cup		Other		Total	
Club	Season	Division	Apps	Goals	Apps	Goals	Apps	Goals	Apps	Goals	Apps	Goals
Coventry City	2017–18	League Two	24	5	4	0	0	0	4 (Note: One appearance in EFL Trophy; three appearances and one goal in League Two play-offs)	1	32	6
Coventry City	2018–19	League One	38	3	1	0	1	0	1 (Note: Appearance(s) in EFL Trophy)	0	41	3
Coventry City	Total		62	8	5	0	1	0	5	1	73	9
Preston North End	2019–20	Championship	1	0	1	0	3	0	–		5	0
Preston North End	2020–21	Championship	11	1	1	0	3	0	–		15	1
Preston North End	2021–22	Championship	0	0	0	0	1	0	–		1	0
Preston North End	Total		12	1	2	0	7	0	–		21	1
Wigan Athletic (loan)	2021–22	League One	8	0	3	0	0	0	5	0	16	0
Shrewsbury Town	2022–23	League One	36	6	3	1	2	0	0	0	41	7
Shrewsbury Town	2023–24	League One	35	3	2	0	1	0	2	0	40	3
Shrewsbury Town	Total		71	9	5	1	3	0	2	0	81	10
Lincoln City	2024–25	League One	34	3	1	0	1	0	3	0	39	3
Lincoln City	2025–26	League One	40	3	1	0	3	0	3	0	47	3
Lincoln City	2026–27	Championship	14	1	0	0	2	1	–		16	2
Lincoln City	Total		88	7	2	0	6	1	6	0	102	8
Career totals			241	25	17	1	17	1	18	1	293	28

== Honours ==
Coventry City

- EFL League Two play-offs: 2018

Lincoln City

- EFL League One: 2025–26
