= 2018 EFL play-offs =

EFL play-offs
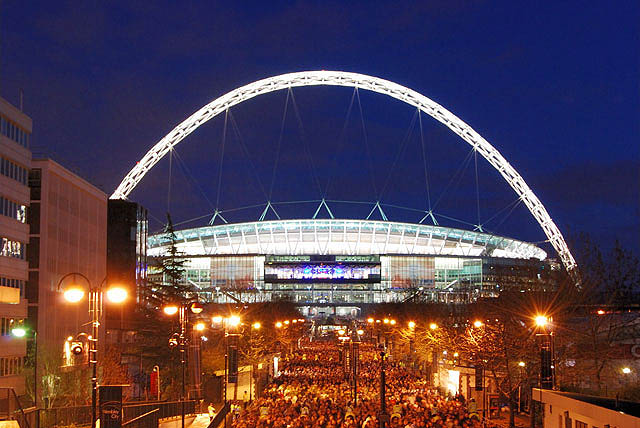
- Wembley Stadium was the venue for each play-off final
- Season: 2017–18
- Matches: 13
- Goals: 24 (1.85 per match)
- Biggest home win: Exeter City 3–1 Lincoln City; Fulham 2–0 Derby County; Rotherham United 2–0 Scunthorpe United
- Biggest away win: Notts County 1–4 Coventry City
- Highest scoring: Notts County 1–4 Coventry City
- Highest attendance: 40,505
- Lowest attendance: 5,645
- Average attendance: 17,637

The English Football League play-offs for the 2017–18 season (referred to as the Sky Bet Play-Offs for sponsorship reasons) were held in May 2018, with all finals being staged at Wembley Stadium in London.

The play-offs began in each league with two semi-finals played over two legs. The teams who finished in 3rd, 4th, 5th and 6th place in the Championship and League One, and the 4th, 5th, 6th and 7th-placed teams in the League Two, competed. The winners of the semi-finals advanced to the finals, with the winners gaining promotion for the following season.

== Background ==
The English Football League play-offs have been held every year since 1987. They take place for each division following the conclusion of the regular season and are contested by the four clubs finishing below the automatic promotion places. The fixtures are determined by final league position – in the Championship and League One this is 3rd v 6th and 4th v 5th, while in League Two it is 4th v 7th and 5th v 6th.

== Championship ==
=== Championship Semi-finals ===
Final league position – Championship
Pos	Team	Pld	W	D	L	GF	GA	GD	Pts
3	Fulham	46	25	13	8	79	46	+33	88
4	Aston Villa	46	24	11	11	72	42	+30	83
5	Middlesbrough	46	22	10	14	67	45	+22	76
6	Derby County	46	20	15	11	69	48	+21	75

First leg

11 May 2018
19:45 BST

Derby County	1–0	Fulham
Jerome 34'	Report

Pride Park Stadium, Derby
Attendance: 27,163
Referee: Roger East
12 May 2018
17:15 BST

Middlesbrough	0–1	Aston Villa
	Report	Jedinak 15'

Riverside Stadium, Middlesbrough
Attendance: 29,233
Referee: Bobby Madley

Second leg

14 May 2018
19:45 BST

Fulham	2–0	Derby County
Sessegnon 48'; Odoi 66'	Report

Craven Cottage, Fulham
Attendance: 23,529
Referee: Chris Kavanagh

Fulham won 2–1 on aggregate.

15 May 2018
19:45 BST

Aston Villa	0–0	Middlesbrough
	Report

Villa Park, Birmingham
Attendance: 40,505
Referee: Mike Dean

Aston Villa won 1–0 on aggregate.

=== Championship final ===
26 May 2018
17:00 BST

Aston Villa	0–1	Fulham
	Report	Cairney 23'

Wembley Stadium, London
Attendance: 85,243
Referee: Anthony Taylor

== League One ==
=== League One Semi-finals ===
Final league position – League One
Pos	Team	Pld	W	D	L	GF	GA	GD	Pts
3	Shrewsbury Town	46	25	12	9	60	39	+21	87
4	Rotherham United	46	24	7	15	73	53	+20	79
5	Scunthorpe United	46	19	17	10	65	50	+15	74
6	Charlton Athletic	46	20	11	15	58	51	+7	71

First leg

10 May 2018
19:45 BST

Charlton Athletic	0–1	Shrewsbury Town
	Report	Nolan 80'

The Valley, Charlton
Attendance: 14,367
Referee: Simon Hooper
12 May 2018
12:30 BST

Scunthorpe United	2–2	Rotherham United
Ihiekwe 18' (o.g.); McGeehan 88'	Report	Taylor 17'; Newell 64'

Glanford Park, Scunthorpe
Attendance: 6,591
Referee: Tim Robinson

Second leg

13 May 2018
17:15 BST

Shrewsbury Town	1–0	Charlton Athletic
C. Morris 58'	Report

New Meadow, Shrewsbury
Attendance: 9,016
Referee: Jeremy Simpson

Shrewsbury Town won 2–0 on aggregate.

16 May 2018
19:45 BST

Rotherham United	2–0	Scunthorpe United
Wood 45+2'; Vaulks 63'	Report

New York Stadium, Rotherham
Attendance: 11,061
Referee: Scott Duncan

Rotherham United won 4–2 on aggregate.

=== League One Final ===
27 May 2018
15:03 BST

Rotherham United	2–1 (a.e.t.)	Shrewsbury Town
Wood 32', 103'	Report	Rodman 58'

Wembley Stadium, London
Attendance: 26,218
Referee: Robert Jones

== League Two ==
=== League Two Semi-finals ===
Final league position – League Two
Pos	Team	Pld	W	D	L	GF	GA	GD	Pts
4	Exeter City	46	24	8	14	64	54	+10	80
5	Notts County	46	21	14	11	71	48	+23	77
6	Coventry City	46	22	9	15	64	47	+17	75
7	Lincoln City	46	20	15	11	64	48	+16	75

First leg

12 May 2018
15:00 BST

Lincoln City	0–0	Exeter City
	Report

Sincil Bank, Lincoln
Attendance: 9,509
Referee: Ben Toner
12 May 2018
19:30 BST

Coventry City	1–1	Notts County
McNulty 87' (pen.)	Report	Forte 49'

Ricoh Arena, Coventry
Attendance: 17,404
Referee: Gavin Ward

Second leg

17 May 2018
19:45 BST

Exeter City	3–1	Lincoln City
Stockley 27'; Boateng 47'; Harley 69'	Report	Green 78'

St James Park, Exeter
Attendance: 5,645
Referee: Darren England

Exeter City won 3–1 on aggregate.

18 May 2018
19:45 BST

Notts County	1–4	Coventry City
Grant 44'	Report	Biamou 6', 71'; McNulty 37'; Bayliss 85'

Meadow Lane, Nottingham
Attendance: 17,615
Referee: Darren Drysdale

Coventry City won 5–2 on aggregate.

=== League Two Final ===
28 May 2018
15:00 BST

Coventry City	3–1	Exeter City
Willis 49'; Shipley 54'; Grimmer 68'		Edwards 89'

Wembley Stadium, London
Attendance: 50,196
Referee: David Webb
