= Aaron Martin (footballer, born 1989) =

English footballer

- Martin warming up at Vale Park in May 2022.

Personal information
- Full name: Aaron Martin
- Date of birth: 29 September 1989 (age 37)
- Place of birth: Newport, Isle of Wight, England
- Height: 6 ft 3 in (1.90 m)
- Position: Centre-back

Youth career
- 2003–2007: Eastleigh

Senior career*
Years	Team	Apps	(Gls)
2007–2009	Eastleigh	36	(4)
2009–2014	Southampton	20	(1)
2010	→ Salisbury City (loan)	14	(1)
2012–2013	→ Crystal Palace (loan)	4	(0)
2013	→ Coventry City (loan)	12	(0)
2014	Birmingham City	8	(0)
2014–2015	Yeovil Town	12	(3)
2014–2015	→ Coventry City (loan)	8	(0)
2015–2016	Coventry City	48	(2)
2016–2018	Oxford United	16	(0)
2018–2020	Exeter City	58	(5)
2020–2021	Hamilton Academical	24	(0)
2021–2022	Port Vale	29	(2)
2022–2024	Eastleigh	44	(0)
Total		333	(18)

International career
- English Schools' U18

Managerial career
- 2025–2026: Havant & Waterlooville
- * Club domestic league appearances and goals

Aaron Martin (born 29 September 1989) is an English football manager and former professional player.

Martin played as a centre-back and began his career with non-League club Eastleigh, before turning professional with Southampton in November 2009. He spent time on loan at Conference Premier club Salisbury City towards the end of the 2009–10 campaign and then played 18 league games across the course of two successive promotions that took Southampton from League One into the Premier League. He spent the 2012–13 season on loan at Crystal Palace and Coventry City, and after missing the first half of the 2013–14 season through injury, his Southampton contract was ended by mutual consent in January 2014.

He signed with Birmingham City and played eight Championship games before joining Yeovil Town in June 2014. He rejoined Coventry City on loan in October 2014 and signed permanently with the club three months later. Released by Coventry, he signed with Oxford United in June 2016, where he would remain for two years before moving on to Exeter City. He played for Exeter in the 2020 League Two play-off final, which ended in defeat. He signed with Hamilton Academical of the Scottish Premiership in November 2020 and returned to England at the end of the 2020–21 campaign to sign for Port Vale. He helped the club to win promotion out of League Two via the play-offs in 2022 before returning to the South of England later in the summer to rejoin Eastleigh for two years.

He began his management career at Havant & Waterlooville in November 2025.

== Early life ==
Martin was born in Newport, Isle of Wight, and attended Heathfield School and Itchen College in Southampton, Hampshire. He represented the English Schools' under-18 football team on several occasions. He had two unsuccessful trials with Southampton at under-12 level.

== Career ==
=== Eastleigh ===
Martin began his career with Conference South club Eastleigh as a 14-year-old, having been tracked by the management team of Ian Baird and Mark Dennis. He had a trial with AFC Bournemouth at the age of 19. He scored his first career goal on 27 January 2009, in a 2–0 win over Bath City at Ten Acres. He scored again four days later, in a 4–0 victory at Dorchester Town, and agreed a new contract with the club. He ended the 2008–09 season with three goals in 27 appearances and played both legs of the club's play-off semi-final defeat to Hayes & Yeading United. He signed a new two-year contract in September 2009 and featured alongside Tom Jordan another 14 times in the early stages of the 2009–10 campaign, scoring one goal in a 6–1 win over Bromley.

=== Southampton ===
Following a trial spell, he joined League One club Southampton on 4 November 2009 for "an undisclosed five-figure sum, plus appearance and sell-on increments", and signed an 18-month contract; he was recommended to the club by Eastleigh manager Ian Baird, a former striker for the Saints. The club were looking for a partner for established centre-back Radhi Jaïdi, and would also sign José Fonte and Danny Seaborne two months later. After playing in Southampton's reserve team, Martin signed on loan for Conference Premier side Salisbury City in March 2010. The loan was extended to the end of the 2009–10 season, and Martin made 15 appearances and scored once for Tommy Widdrington's Whites, in a 3–1 win against Ebbsfleet United on 2 April, before returning to Southampton in late April. On 1 May, Martin made his debut first-team appearance for the Saints, starting alongside Fonte in the centre of defence against Gillingham in the season's penultimate game. Southampton manager Alan Pardew said he thought Martin was his team's best player in the game, adding that "he passed it well and looked comfortable in the shirt". He also started the final game of the season, against Southend United, playing alongside Jaïdi.

Martin started just four league games in the 2010–11 campaign, as new manager Nigel Adkins preferred to partner Fonte and Jaïdi, with Seaborne as back-up. Southampton went on to win promotion into the Championship as runners-up of League One. He committed to a new three-year deal with Southampton ahead of the 2011–12 season. Again partnering Fonte, he played the whole of Southampton's first game of the new season, against Leeds United. His first goal for Southampton proved to be the matchwinner in a 2–1 victory over Coventry City in the third round of the FA Cup on 7 January, and in February, he came on as a half-time substitute against Derby County to score his first league goal, Southampton's second in a 4–0 win. He made seven league starts and 17 appearances across all competitions as Southampton were promoted to the Premier League in second-place.

After Japan international Maya Yoshida was signed, Martin then moved out to Championship club Crystal Palace on loan for the 2012–13 season. Manager Dougie Freedman said that he had watched Martin since his time at Eastleigh and saw him "playing a major role in our continued progress". He played five matches in his first month at Selhurst Park, but then played only once more after Ian Holloway replaced Freedman as the Crystal Palace manager, and the loan was cancelled by mutual agreement in January 2013. The following month Martin was again loaned out, this time to League One side Coventry City, where he played regularly until the end of the season. He impressed Coventry boss Steven Pressley, who named him as a top transfer target for the summer once the transfer embargo placed on the Ricoh Arena club was lifted.

The signing of another centre-back, Dejan Lovren, pushed Martin down to fifth-choice centre-back at St Mary's, and an injury sustained in pre-season kept Martin out of action until January 2014. His contract with Southampton was ended by mutual consent on 28 January as he was not part of manager Mauricio Pochettino's first-team plans.

=== Birmingham City ===
Two days after his release, he joined Championship club Birmingham City on a short-term deal until the end of the 2013–14 season, after manager Lee Clark had Dan Burn and Kyle Bartley recalled from their loan spells. He made his debut at St Andrew's on 1 February, coming off the bench after 14 minutes to replace the injured Tom Thorpe, in a 3–3 draw with Derby County. He played infrequently, making the last of his eight appearances on 29 March, and was released when his contract expired.

=== Yeovil Town ===
Following his release from Birmingham, Martin signed for League One side Yeovil Town on a two-year contract on 4 June 2014. He made his debut in the Glovers 3–0 opening-day defeat to Doncaster Rovers at Huish Park. He scored a brace on 6 September, in a 3–1 win at Bradford City. Martin commented after the game that manager Gary Johnson had ordered him to be more aggressive at set pieces and the advice had paid off.

=== Coventry City ===
On 29 October 2014, Martin joined fellow League One side Coventry City on loan until 5 January, in a deal which saw Jordan Clarke move in the other direction. Martin was released from his Yeovil contract and signed for Coventry permanently on an 18-month contract on 9 January. He ended the 2014–15 season with 28 appearances for Coventry, in addition to his 14 appearances for Yeovil. He recovered from an ankle injury to play 32 games in the 2015–16 campaign, scoring two goals, as Coventry finished two places outside of the play-off places. He was named as the Football League Unsung Hero of the Month for January after making several visits to schools in deprived areas around Coventry and donating £1,000 to a children's charity. In May 2016, manager Tony Mowbray opted to release Martin at the end of his contract due to his lack of aggression, citing it as his most difficult decision of the summer.

=== Oxford United ===
On 25 June 2016, Martin joined League One club Oxford United on a two-year contract, citing manager Michael Appleton's style of play as a factor in his move to the Kassam Stadium. On 8 November, he took part in the longest penalty shoot-out in English professional football history, as Oxford were beaten 13–12 by Chelsea U23's in the Football League Trophy; Martin missed his penalty when the scores were level at 7–7. He struggled with minor injuries and was limited to 11 appearances in the first half of the 2016–17 campaign, before a ruptured Achilles tendon in December ruled him out for the remainder of the season. New manager Pep Clotet had stated that Martin would be one of four centre-backs in the 2017–18 season, along with Mike Williamson, Curtis Nelson and Charlie Raglan. However, John Mousinho was signed at the end of August. Martin was limited to ten league starts and nine other appearances and was released by new manager Karl Robinson.

=== Exeter City ===
On 25 June 2018, Martin joined League Two club Exeter City on a free transfer, although his contract length was undisclosed. Manager Matt Taylor cited Martin's character and experience as important factors in bringing him to St James Park. He played 27 matches in the 2018–19 season, scoring three goals, as the Grecians finished one point outside the play-offs. He made 45 appearances in the 2019–20 campaign, scoring three goals, including a goal in the club's 3–2 aggregate play-off semi-final victory over Colchester United. He played at Wembley Stadium in the final, which ended in a 4–0 defeat to Northampton Town, with one of the goals deflecting off his heel into the net. Martin was released by Exeter at the end of his contract in July 2020.

=== Hamilton Academical ===
Martin signed for Scottish Premiership club Hamilton Academical on 7 November 2020. Speaking three months later, manager Brian Rice said that he was a "magnificent signing" and had "been everything and much more than I expected" following Gary Warren's recommendation, and praised Martin for not exercising a clause in his contract to end his contract early in January to return to his family home in Southampton. Despite it being a good season for Martin in terms of personal performances as part of a back three, the Accies were relegated in last place in 2020–21. He left New Douglas Park upon the expiry of his contract.

=== Port Vale ===
On 9 June 2021, Martin signed an agreement to join English League Two club Port Vale and was described as a "model professional" by manager Darrell Clarke, who cited the player's previous work with assistant manager Andy Crosby at Southampton. He picked up a back injury early in the 2021–22 season, but scored his first goal for the "Valiants" in a 3–0 win over Colchester United at Vale Park on 23 October. He played as a substitute in the play-off final at Wembley Stadium as Vale secured promotion with a 3–0 victory over Mansfield Town. However, Martin requested a transfer so that he could remain closer to his family in the South.

=== Eastleigh ===
In July 2022, Martin returned to Eastleigh after having left the club 13 years previously; manager Lee Bradbury noted that "he's a local lad coming home". Martin was announced as club captain ahead of the commencement of the 2022–23 season and went on to feature 36 times throughout the campaign, helping Eastleigh to a solid defensive record. However, they did not achieve their aim of making the play-offs. In April 2024, Martin announced his retirement from professional football at the end of the 2023–24 season.

== Style of play ==
Martin was a 6-foot-3-inch (1.90 m) centre-back. A laid-back individual, he admitted that he needed to add more aggression to his game and be more dominant in the air. He was a vocal player with good organisational and leadership skills and was comfortable in possession.

== Managerial career ==
=== Havant & Waterlooville ===
On 17 November 2025, Martin was appointed as manager of Southern League Premier Division South club Havant & Waterlooville. On 24 September 2026, Martin was sacked.

== Career statistics ==
Appearances and goals by club, season and competition
Club	Season	League			National cup (Note: Includes FA Cup, Scottish Cup)		League cup (Note: Includes Football League Cup, Scottish League Cup)		Other		Total	
Club	Season	Division	Apps	Goals	Apps	Goals	Apps	Goals	Apps	Goals	Apps	Goals
Eastleigh	2007–08	Conference South	0	0	0	0	—		0	0	0	0
Eastleigh	2008–09	Conference South	24	3	0	0	—		3 (Note: One appearance in FA Trophy, two in Conference South play-offs)	0	27	3
Eastleigh	2009–10	Conference South	12	1	2	0	—		—		14	1
Eastleigh	Total		36	4	2	0	0	0	3	0	41	4
Southampton	2009–10	League One	2	0	—		—		0	0	2	0
Southampton	2010–11	League One	8	0	1	0	1	0	0	0	10	0
Southampton	2011–12	Championship	10	1	3	1	4	0	—		17	2
Southampton	2012–13	Premier League	0	0	—		0	0	—		0	0
Southampton	2013–14	Premier League	0	0	0	0	0	0	—		0	0
Southampton	Total		20	1	4	1	5	0	0	0	29	2
Salisbury City (loan)	2009–10	Conference Premier	14	1	—		—		1 (Note: Appearance in FA Trophy)	0	15	1
Crystal Palace (loan)	2012–13	Championship	4	0	—		2	0	—		6	0
Coventry City (loan)	2012–13	League One	12	0	—		—		—		12	0
Birmingham City	2013–14	Championship	8	0	—		—		—		8	0
Yeovil Town	2014–15	League One	12	3	—		1	0	1 (Note: Appearance(s) in Football League Trophy)	0	14	3
Coventry City	2014–15	League One	27	0	1	0	—		—		28	0
Coventry City	2015–16	League One	29	2	1	0	1	0	1	0	32	2
Coventry City	Total		56	2	2	0	1	0	1	0	60	2
Oxford United	2016–17	League One	4	0	3	0	1	0	3 (Note: Appearances in EFL Trophy)	0	11	0
Oxford United	2017–18	League One	12	0	1	0	1	0	5	0	19	0
Oxford United	Total		16	0	4	0	2	0	8	0	30	0
Exeter City	2018–19	League Two	23	3	0	0	2	0	2	0	27	3
Exeter City	2019–20	League Two	35	2	4	0	1	0	5 (Note: Two appearances in the EFL Trophy and three appearances in the League Two play-offs)	0	45	2
Exeter City	Total		58	5	4	0	3	0	7	0	72	5
Hamilton Academical	2020–21	Scottish Premiership	24	0	1	0	1	0	—		26	0
Port Vale	2021–22	League Two	29	2	3	0	0	0	4 (Note: Two appearances in the EFL Trophy and two appearances in the League Two play-offs)	1	36	3
Eastleigh	2022–23	National League	33	0	2	0	—		1	0	36	0
Eastleigh	2023–24	National League	11	0	0	0	—		0	0	11	0
Eastleigh	Total		44	0	2	0	0	0	1	0	47	0
Career total			321	18	22	1	14	0	25	1	382	20

== Honours ==
Port Vale

- EFL League Two play-offs: 2022
