= 2014–15 Coventry City F.C. season =

Coventry City
2014–15 season
- Chairman: Tim Fisher
- Manager: Steven Pressley (until 23 February); Tony Mowbray (from 3 March)
- Stadium: Sixfields Stadium (until 21 August); Ricoh Arena (from 21 August)
- League One: 17th
- FA Cup: First round vs Worcester City
- League Cup: First round vs Cardiff City
- Football League Trophy: Area Semi-Final vs Bristol City
- Top goalscorer: League: Frank Nouble, Jim O'Brien, Dominic Samuel 6 All: Frank Nouble 7
- Highest home attendance: 27,306 vs Gillingham (League One – 5 September 2014)
- Lowest home attendance: 1,382 vs Cardiff City (League Cup – 13 August 2014)
- Average home league attendance: 9,332
Home colours	Away colours

The 2014–15 season was Coventry City's 95th season in The Football League and their third consecutive season in League One. In addition to League One, the Sky Blues also entered the Football League Cup, FA Cup and Football League Trophy competitions.

On 9 November 2014 Coventry were eliminated from the FA Cup in the 1st Round following a shock 2–1 home defeat to Football Conference North side Worcester City, and the second time they had lost to non-league opposition in 25 years following their defeat away to Sutton United in January 1989. This was in the wake of their 1st Round elimination from the Football League Cup in August, having lost 1–2 at home to Football League Championship side Cardiff City.

== Review and events ==
=== Monthly events ===
21 August – Coventry City returned to the Ricoh Arena following thirteen months playing at Northampton Town's Sixfields Stadium.

5 September - Coventry City played their first match back at Ricoh Arena in a 1-0 victory against Gillingham F.C.

== Squad details 14-15 ==
No.	Name	Position	Nationality	Place of birth	Date of birth (age) *	Club apps *	Club goals *	Signed from	Date signed	Fee	Contract End
Goalkeepers
1	Lee Burge	GK	(England)	Hereford	9 January 1993 (aged 21)	0	0	Academy	1 June 2010	Trainee	30 June 2017
33	Reice Charles-Cook	GK	(England)	Lewisham	8 April 1994 (aged 20)	0	0	Bury	18 July 2014	Free	30 July 2015
43	Jake Richards	GK	(England)	Coventry	30 December 1996 (aged 17)	0	0	Academy	1 June 2014	Trainee	30 June 2015
Defenders
2	Jordan Willis	CB	(England)	Coventry	24 August 1994 (aged 19)	32	0	Academy	1 June 2011	Trainee	30 June 2015
3	Danny Pugh	LB	(England)	Cheadle Hulme	19 October 1982 (aged 31)	0	0	Leeds United	16 July 2014	Free	30 June 2015
4	Andy Webster	CB	(Scotland)	Dundee	23 April 1982 (aged 32)	41	2	(Scotland) Heart of Midlothian	9 August 2013	Free	30 June 2015
5	Réda Johnson	CB	(Benin) (France)	Marseille	21 March 1988 (aged 26)	0	0	Sheffield Wednesday	4 July 2014	Free	30 June 2015
18	Aaron Phillips	RB	(England)	Warwick	20 November 1993 (aged 20)	11	1	Academy	1 June 2011	Trainee	30 June 2016
21	Aaron Martin	CB	(England)	Newport	29 September 1989 (aged 24)	13	0	Yeovil Town	9 January 2015	Free	30 June 2016
22	Matthew Pennington	CB	(England)	Warrington	6 October 1994 (aged 19)	0	0	Everton	27 November 2014	Loan	4 January 2015
30	Chris Stokes	LB	(England)	Frome	8 April 1991 (aged 23)	0	0	Forest Green Rovers	21 February 2015	Loan	30 June 2015
26	Ryan Haynes	LB	(England)	Northampton	27 September 1995 (aged 18)	3	0	Academy	27 March 2013	Trainee	30 June 2017
39	Cian Harries	CB	(Wales) (England)	Solihull	1 April 1997 (aged 17)	0	0	Academy	1 June 2014	Trainee	30 June 2015
39	Dion Kelly-Evans	RB	(England)	Coventry	21 September 1996 (aged 17)	0	0	Academy	1 June 2014	Trainee	30 June 2015
Midfielders
6	Conor Thomas	CM	(England)	Coventry	29 October 1993 (aged 20)	81	1	Academy	1 June 2010	Trainee	30 June 2016
7	John Fleck	CM	(Scotland)	Glasgow	24 August 1991 (aged 22)	78	4	(Scotland) Rangers	4 July 2012	Free	30 June 2015
8	Grant Ward	CM	(England)	Lewisham	5 December 1994 (aged 19)	0	0	Tottenham Hotspur	13 March 2015	Loan	30 June 2015
10	Danny Swanson	AM	(Scotland)	Edinburgh	28 December 1986 (aged 27)	0	0	Peterborough United	3 July 2014	Free	30 June 2016
11	Jim O'Brien	AM	(Scotland) (Republic of Ireland)	Alexandria	28 September 1987 (aged 26)	0	0	Barnsley	4 July 2014	Free	30 June 2016
15	Sanmi Odelusi	AM	(England)	Dagenham	11 June 1993 (aged 21)	0	0	Bolton Wanderers	31 January 2015	Loan	30 June 2015
16	Adam Barton	CM	(Republic of Ireland) (England)	Blackburn	7 January 1991 (aged 23)	36	3	Preston North End	6 August 2012	Undisclosed	30 June 2015
23	Blair Turgott	LW/RW	(England)	Bromley	22 May 1994 (aged 20)	0	0	West Ham United	2 February 2015	Free	30 June 2015
24	Al Bangura	CM	(Sierra Leone)	Freetown	24 January 1988 (aged 26)	0	0	Forest Green Rovers	20 March 2015	Free	30 June 2015
27	Jack Finch	DM	(England)	Fenny Compton	6 August 1996 (aged 17)	0	0	Academy	1 April 2014	Trainee	30 June 2015
28	Ivor Lawton	CM	(England)	Coventry	5 September 1995 (aged 18)	0	0	Academy	26 November 2013	Trainee	30 June 2015
35	Devon Kelly-Evans	LW	(England)	Coventry	21 September 1996 (aged 17)	0	0	Academy	1 June 2014	Trainee	30 June 2015
36	James Maddison	AM	(England)	Coventry	23 November 1996 (aged 17)	0	0	Academy	4 October 2013	Trainee	30 June 2015
37	George Thomas	AM	(Wales) (England)	Leicester	24 March 1997 (aged 17)	1	0	Academy	25 October 2013	Free	30 June 2015
38	Kyle Spence	LM	(Scotland) (England)	Croydon	14 January 1997 (aged 17)	0	0	Academy	1 September 2014	Trainee	30 June 2015
Forwards
9	Nick Proschwitz	CF	(Germany)	Weißenfels	28 November 1986 (aged 27)	0	0	Brentford	27 February 2015	Loan	30 June 2015
12	Simeon Jackson	CF	(Canada) (Jamaica)	Kingston	28 March 1987 (aged 27)	0	0	Millwall	18 August 2014	Free	30 June 2015
14	Dominic Samuel	CF	(England)	Southwark	1 April 1994 (aged 20)	0	0	Reading	29 January 2015	Loan	30 June 2015
15	Shaun Miller	CF	(England)	Alsager	25 September 1987 (aged 26)	0	0	Sheffield United	16 July 2014	Free	30 June 2015
19	Frank Nouble	CF	(England)	Lewisham	24 October 1991 (aged 22)	0	0	Ipswich Town	1 September 2014	Loan	4 January 2015
20	Marcus Tudgay	CF	(England)	Shoreham-by-Sea	3 February 1983 (aged 31)	0	0	Nottingham Forest	29 July 2014	Free	30 June 2015
Left before the end of the season
8	Gary Madine	CF	(England)	Gateshead	15 December 1989 (aged 24)	10	0	Sheffield Wednesday	24 August 1990	Loan	January 2015
9	Josh McQuoid	CF	(Northern Ireland) (England)	Southampton	15 December 1989 (aged 24)	0	0	Bournemouth	4 July 2014	Loan	January 2015
17	Billy Daniels	CM	(England)	Bristol	3 July 1994 (aged 19)	22	3	Academy	1 June 2011	Trainee	30 June 2016
23	Ryan Allsop	GK	(England)	Birmingham	17 June 1992 (aged 22)	0	0	Bournemouth	4 July 2014	Loan	January 2015
24	Jordan Clarke	RB	(England)	Coventry	19 November 1991 (aged 22)	113	3	Academy	1 June 2008	Trainee	30 June 2015
25	Seb Hines	CB	(England)	Wetherby	29 May 1988 (aged 26)	0	0	Middlesbrough	1 September 2014	Loan	4 January 2015

* Player age and appearances/goals for the club as of beginning of 2014–15 season.

== Matches ==
=== Preseason friendlies ===
19 July 2014 Friendly	Nuneaton Town	A–A	Coventry City	Nuneaton
15:00				Stadium: Liberty Way

21 July 2014 Friendly	Roma B (Italy)	0–2	Coventry City	Levico Terme
18:00 CET		Report	Miller 5'; Pugh 74'	Stadium: Levico Terme Stadium; Attendance: 80

23 July 2014 Friendly	Chievo Verona (Italy)	3–0	Coventry City	Trentino
18:00 CET	Biraghi 2'; Kupisz 15'; Pellissier 33' (pen.)	Report		Stadium: Sanzeno di Montagna Stadium

24 July 2014 Friendly	AEL Kalloni (Greece)	0–0	Coventry City	Levico Terme
18:00 CET	Keita (red card) 22'; Dalgado (red card) 33'	Report	Pugh (red card) 22'; Daniels (red card) 35'	Stadium: Levico Terme Stadium

29 July 2014 Friendly	Newport County	1–0	Coventry City	Newport
19:30	Yakubu 22'	Report		Stadium: Newport International Sports Village; Attendance: 828

30 July 2014 Friendly	Watford	0–1	Coventry City	Borehamwood
19:30		Report	Tudgay 8'	Stadium: Meadow Park

1 August 2014 Friendly	Bristol Rovers	1–2	Coventry City	Bristol
19:45	Monkhouse 42'	Report	Swanson 66'; Phillips 70'	Stadium: Memorial Stadium; Attendance: 1,821 (120 Sky Blue Army)

2 August 2014 Friendly	Stevenage	2–1	Coventry City	Stevenage
15:00	Deacon 56', 62'	Report	Tudgay 72'	Stadium: Broadhall Way

=== League One ===
The fixtures for the 2014–15 season were announced on 18 June 2014 at 9am.

9 August 2014 1	Bradford City	3–2	Coventry City	Bradford
15:00	Hanson 27', 90+1'; Sheehan 49' (pen.); Knott (yellow card) 34'; Kennedy (yellow card) 40'	report	Johnson 41', 89' (yellow card) 48'; Tudgay (yellow card) 70'; Fleck (yellow card) 90+5'	Stadium: Valley Parade; Attendance: 14,621 (1,406 away); Referee: Andy D'Urso

16 August 2014 2	Coventry City	1–0	Sheffield United	Northampton
15:00	O'Brien 78'	report	Basham (yellow card) 34'; Harris (yellow card) 65'	Stadium: Sixfields Stadium; Attendance: 2,279 (931 away); Referee: Graham Scott

19 August 2014 3	Coventry City	2–2	Barnsley	Northampton
19:45	McQuoid 4'; Clarke 44' (yellow card) 33'	report	Hourihane 31' (yellow card) 90+3'; Lita 45+3'; Cranie (yellow card) 74'	Stadium: Sixfields Stadium; Attendance: 2,376 (883 away); Referee: Patrick Miller

23 August 2014 4	Milton Keynes Dons	0–0	Coventry City	Milton Keynes
15:00	Bowditch (yellow card) 39'; Alli (yellow card) 90+2'	report	McQuoid (yellow card) 59'; Fleck (yellow card) 60'	Stadium: stadium:mk Attendance: 10,600 (3,601 Sky Blue Army); Referee: Darren Sheldrake

30 August 2014 5	Swindon Town	1–1	Coventry City	Swindon
15:00	Turnbull (yellow card) 67'; Branco 41' (yellow card) 90+2'	report	McQuoid 41'; Johnson (yellow card) 61'	Stadium: The County Ground; Attendance: 7,299 (851 away); Referee: Darren Deadman

5 September 2014 6	Coventry City	1–0	Gillingham	Coventry
20:00	Nouble 10'; Clarke (yellow card) 36'; Fleck (yellow card) 83'; Thomas (yellow card) 87'	report	Martin (yellow card) 36'	Stadium: Ricoh Arena; Attendance: 27,306 (495 away); Referee: Keith Stroud

13 September 2014 7	Coventry City	2–1	Yeovil Town	Coventry
15:00	Johnson 7'; Jackson 68'	Report	Foley 51'	Stadium: Ricoh Arena; Attendance: 11,085; Referee: Dean Whitestone

16 September 2014 8	Scunthorpe United	2–1	Coventry City	Scunthorpe
19:45	Madden 38'; Taylor 62'	Report	Nouble 17'; Johnson (red card) 24'	Stadium: Glanford Park; Attendance: 2,866 (379 Sky Blue Army); Referee: Mark Haywood

20 September 2014 9	Rochdale	1–0	Coventry City	Rochdale
15:00	Henderson 29' (pen.)	Report		Stadium: Spotland Stadium; Attendance: 3,583; Referee: Phil Gibbs

27 September 2014 10	Coventry City	0–2	Preston North End	Coventry
15:00	Swanson (yellow card) 11'; Haynes (yellow card) 61'; Hines (yellow card) 76'; Coulibaly (yellow card) 79'	Report	Clarke 62'; Garner 67' (pen.); Wiseman (yellow card) 85'	Stadium: Ricoh Arena; Attendance: 10,006 (783 away); Referee: Tim Robinson

4 October 2014 11	Coventry City	2–2	Crawley Town	Coventry
15:00	McQuoid 14'; Jackson 27'; Thomas (yellow card) 70'; Coulibaly (yellow card) 87'	Report	Edwards 33'; McLeod 37'; Keane (yellow card) 90+3'	Stadium: Ricoh Arena; Attendance: 7,708; Referee: Graham Salisbury

11 October 2014 12	Crewe Alexandra	2–1	Coventry City	Crewe
15:00	Brandy 26'; Cooper 32'; Dugdale (yellow card) 35'; Grant (yellow card) 48'; Ray (yellow card) 57'; Inman (yellow card) 78'	Report	Fleck (yellow card) 20'; Finch (yellow card) 31' (yellow-red card) 82'; Grant 48' (o.g.)	Stadium: Gresty Road; Attendance: 5,058; Referee: Charles Breakspear

18 October 2014 13	Coventry City	1–3	Bristol City	Coventry
15:00	Miller 76'	Report	Pack 11'; Agard 45+2'; Elliott (yellow card) 90+1'; Wagstaff 90+2'	Stadium: Ricoh Arena; Attendance: 11,888; Referee: Scott Duncan

21 October 2014 14	Oldham Athletic	4–1	Coventry City	Oldham
19:45	Philliskirk 9'; Forte 29', 41'; Ibehre 78'	Report	Maddison 35'; Thomas (yellow card) 89'	Stadium: Boundary Park; Attendance: 3,224; Referee: Nigel Miller

25 October 2014 15	Coventry City	3–2	Peterborough United	Coventry
15:00	Johnson (yellow card) 27'; Haynes 49'; Thomas (yellow card) 51'; O'Brien 62'; Nouble 64' (yellow card) 65'	Report	Taylor 17'; Maddison 28'; Payne (yellow card) 74'	Stadium: Ricoh Arena; Attendance: 8,957; Referee: Roger East

1 November 2014 16	Leyton Orient	2–2	Coventry City	Leyton
15:00	Cuthbert 54'; Simpson 70'; Batt (yellow card) 95'	Report	O'Brien 35', 91'; Fleck (yellow card) 49'; Barton (yellow card) 70'; Burge (yellow card) 87'	Stadium: Brisbane Road; Attendance: 5,464; Referee: Jeremy Simpson

15 November 2014 17	Coventry City	0–1	Notts County	Coventry
15:00	Finch (yellow card) 87'	BBC Report	Thompson 72'; Noble (yellow card) 87'	Stadium: Ricoh Arena; Attendance: 8,116; Referee: Michael Bull

22 November 2014 18	Colchester United	0–1	Coventry City	Colchester
15:00		Report	Madine 74'; Phillips (yellow card) 90+1'	Stadium: Colchester Community Stadium; Attendance: 4,433; Referee: Andy Woolmer

29 November 2014 19	Coventry City	0–0	Walsall	Coventry
15:00	Finch (yellow card) 90+3'	Report		Stadium: Ricoh Arena; Attendance: 8,076; Referee: Richard Clark

13 December 2014 20	Port Vale	0–2	Coventry City	Burslem
15:00		Report	McQuoid (yellow card) 41'; Johnson 57'; Madine 90+5' (yellow card) 90+6'	Stadium: Vale Park; Attendance: 5,321; Referee: Mark Heywood

20 December 2014 21	Coventry City	1–1	Fleetwood Town	Coventry
15:00	Haynes (yellow card) 46'; Jackson 80' (yellow card) 87'	Report	Webster 19' (o.g.); Hughes (yellow card) 52'	Stadium: Ricoh Arena; Attendance: 10,254; Referee: Lee Collins

26 December 2014 22	Doncaster Rovers	2–0	Coventry City	Doncaster
15:00	Butler 2'; Forrester (yellow card) 15' (goal) 22'	Report	Maddison (yellow card) 13' (yellow-red card) 76'; Barton (yellow card) 42' (yellow-red card) 74'; Pennington (yellow card) 67'; Webster (yellow card) 83'	Stadium: Keepmoat Stadium; Attendance: 6,916; Referee: Chris Kavanagh

28 December 2014 23	Coventry City	0–0	Chesterfield	Coventry
15:00	Jackson (yellow card) 20'; Martin (yellow card) 40'; Fleck (yellow card) 60'	Report	Gnanduillet (yellow card) 40'; Boco (yellow card) 59'	Stadium: Ricoh Arena; Attendance: 10,166; Referee: Darren Handley

3 January 2015 24	Walsall	0–2	Coventry City	Walsall
15:00		Report	O'Brien 6'; Thomas (yellow card) 73'; Tudgay 87'	Stadium: Bescot Stadium; Attendance: 5,930; Referee: Carl Boyeson

12 January 2015 25	Coventry City	0–3	Swindon Town	Coventry
19:45	Webster (yellow card) 35'	Report	Williams 8', 18' (pen.); Thompson (yellow card) 43'; Obika 81'	Stadium: Ricoh Arena; Attendance: 7,098; Referee: Keith Stroud

17 January 2015 26	Gillingham	3–1	Coventry City	Gillingham, Kent
15:00	Egan (yellow card) 40'; Ehmer (yellow card) 73'; Marquis 82'; McDonald 88' (pen.); McGlashan 90+4'	Report	Madine 35' (pen.); Haynes (yellow card) 87'	Stadium: Priestfield Stadium; Attendance: 5,141; Referee: (England) James Linington

24 January 2015 27	Yeovil Town	0–0	Coventry City	Yeovil
15:00	Arthurworrey (yellow card) 20'	Report		Stadium: Huish Park; Attendance: 4,422; Referee: Andy Haines

31 January 2015 28	Coventry City	2–2	Rochdale	Coventry
15:00	Samuel 24'; Odelusi 38'; Fleck (yellow card) 81'; Nouble (yellow card) 90+2'	Report	Camps 33'; Andrew (yellow card) 62' (goal) 66'; Henderson (yellow card) 70'; Dawson (yellow card) 73'; Vincenti (yellow card) 87'	Stadium: Ricoh Arena; Attendance: 7,606; Referee: Andy Woolmer

7 February 2015 29	Preston North End	1–0	Coventry City	Preston
15:00	Davies 21'	Report		Stadium: Deepdale; Attendance: 13,363; Referee: Mark Brown

10 February 2015 30	Coventry City	1–1	Scunthorpe United	Coventry
19:45	Martin (yellow card) 20'; Willis (yellow card) 44'; O'Brien (yellow card) 73'; Tudgay (yellow card) 81' (goal) 90+3'	Report	McSheffrey 21' (yellow card) 58'; O'Neil (yellow card) 56'	Stadium: Ricoh Arena; Attendance: 6,885; Referee: (England) Kevin Johnson

21 February 2015 31	Sheffield United	2–2	Coventry City	Sheffield
15:00	Harris (yellow card) 5'; Baxter (red card) 19'; Doyle 78'; Murphy 80'; Brayford (yellow card) 86'	Report	O'Brien (yellow card) 14'; Samuel (yellow card) 31' (goal) 33', 47'; Barton (yellow card) 45+2'; Haynes (yellow card) 81'	Stadium: Bramall Lane; Attendance: 20,314; Referee: Darren Drysdale

28 February 2015 32	Coventry City	2–1	Milton Keynes Dons	Coventry
15:00 GMT	Stokes 9'; Samuel 12'; Burge (yellow card) 87'; Phillips (yellow card) 90'	Report	Carruthers (yellow card) 37'; Powell 56'; McFadzean (yellow card) 86'	Stadium: Ricoh Arena; Attendance: 9,934; Referee: Richard Clark

3 March 2015 33	Barnsley	1–0	Coventry City	Barnsley
19:45 GMT	Waring 57' (yellow card) 58'	Report	Martin (yellow card) 41'	Stadium: Oakwell; Attendance: 9,567; Referee: Tony Harrington

7 March 2015 34	Coventry City	2–3	Port Vale	Coventry
15:00 GMT	O'Brien 4' (yellow card) 75'; Odelusi 70'	Report	Dickinson (yellow card) 15'; Inniss (yellow card) 36'; Pope 40'; Marshall 45'; O'Connor 76'	Stadium: Ricoh Arena; Attendance: 9,446; Referee: Mike Russell

10 March 2015 35	Coventry City	1–1	Bradford City	Coventry
19:45 GMT	Nouble 45'; Pennington (yellow card) 60'; Martin (yellow card) 69'; Fleck (yellow card) 90'	Report	Yeates 69' (yellow card) 70'	Stadium: Ricoh Arena; Attendance: 8,566; Referee: Gary Sutton

14 March 2015 36	Chesterfield	2–3	Coventry City	Chesterfield
15:00 GMT	O'Shea 42'; Ariyibi 85'	Report	Tudgay 9'; Odelusi 65'; Nouble 75'	Stadium: Proact Stadium; Attendance: 7,205; Referee: Dean Whitestone

17 March 2015 37	Fleetwood Town	0–2	Coventry City	Fleetwood
19:45 GMT	Schumacher (yellow card) 60'; Hunter (yellow card) 80'; Pond (yellow card) 85'	Report	Stokes (yellow card) 84'; Samuel 88'; Nouble 90'	Stadium: Highbury Stadium; Attendance: 3,017; Referee: Peter Bankes

21 March 2015 38	Coventry City	1–3	Doncaster Rovers	Coventry
15:00 GMT	Samuel 5'; Nouble (yellow card) 14'; O'Brien (yellow card) 38'	Report	Razak (yellow card) 17'; Wellens 50'; Clarke-Harris 72' (yellow card) 74'; Forrester 84'	Stadium: Ricoh Arena; Attendance: 8,699; Referee: (England) Carl Boyeson

28 March 2015 39	Peterborough United	0–1	Coventry City	Peterborough
15:00 GMT		Report	Turgott 70'	Stadium: London Road Stadium; Attendance: 7,325; Referee: (England) Iain Williamson

1 April 2015 40	Coventry City	0–1	Leyton Orient	Coventry
19:45 GMT	Nouble (yellow card) 34'	Report	Wright 78'	Stadium: Ricoh Arena; Attendance: 8,010; Referee: (England) Darren Bond

6 April 2015 41	Notts County	0–0	Coventry City	Nottingham
15:00 GMT	Smith (yellow card) 45+2'; Edwards (yellow card) 86'; Hollis (yellow card) 90+3'	Report		Stadium: Meadow Lane; Attendance: 6,706; Referee: (England) Jeremy Simpson

11 April 2015 42	Coventry City	1–0	Colchester United	Coventry
15:00 GMT	O'Brien 36'; Johnson (yellow card) 74'	Report		Stadium: Ricoh Arena; Attendance: 8,933; Referee: (England) David Webb

14 April 2015 43	Coventry City	1–1	Oldham Athletic	Coventry
19:45 GMT	Pennington (yellow card) 41'; Johnson 90+1'	Report	Philliskirk 13'; Murphy (yellow card) 81'; Kelly (yellow card) 85'; Jones (yellow card) 88'; Morgan-Smith (yellow card) 90'	Stadium: Ricoh Arena; Attendance: 7,256; Referee: (England) Andy Madley

18 April 2015 44	Bristol City	0–0	Coventry City	Bristol
15:00 GMT	Pack (yellow card) 17'; Bryan (yellow card) 25'	Report	Nouble (yellow card) 15'; Willis (yellow card) 63'; Pennington (yellow card) 78'; O'Brien (yellow card) 80'	Stadium: Ashton Gate; Attendance: 12,093; Referee: (England) David Coote

25 April 2015 45	Coventry City	1–3	Crewe Alexandra	Coventry
15:00 GMT	Proschwitz 85'; Johnson (yellow card) 86'	Report	Dalla Valle 23'; Colclough 35'; Haber 73'	Stadium: Ricoh Arena; Attendance: 13,983; Referee: (England) Chris Sarginson

3 May 2015 46	Crawley Town	1–2	Coventry City	Crawley
12:15 GMT	Pogba 49'; Youga (yellow card) 64'	Report	Tudgay 73'; Maddison 90'; O'Brien (yellow card) 18'	Stadium: Broadfield Stadium; Attendance: 5,744; Referee: (England) Steve Martin

=== FA Cup ===
The draw for the first round of the FA Cup was made on 27 October 2014.

9 November 2014 First round	Coventry City	1–2	Worcester City	Coventry
14:00	Johnson 81'; Burge (red card) 39'; Tudgay (yellow card) 85'; Finch (yellow card) 93'	Report	Geddes 41', 55'; Thomas (yellow card) 47'; Jackman (yellow card) 83'; Vaughan (yellow card) 84'; Deeney (yellow card) 85'	Stadium: Ricoh Arena; Attendance: 8,439; Referee: Reece Joyce

=== League Cup ===
The draw for the first round was made on 17 June 2014 at 10am. Coventry City were drawn at home to Cardiff City.

13 August 2014 First Round	Coventry City	1–2	Cardiff City	Northampton
19:45	Miller 83'	report	Burgstaller 4'; Haynes 81' (o.g.); Connolly (yellow card) 20'	Stadium: Sixfields Stadium; Attendance: 1,382; Referee: Simon Hooper

=== Football League Trophy ===
2 September 2014 First Round	Wycombe Wanderers	0–1	Coventry City	High Wycombe
19:45	Rowe (yellow card) 51'	Report	McQuoid 66'; Thomas (yellow card) 90+1'	Stadium: Adams Park; Attendance: 1,685 (520 Sky Blue Army); Referee: Mick Russell

7 October 2014 Second Round	Coventry City	3–1	Exeter City	Coventry
19:45	Phillips (yellow card) 25' (goal) 35', 45+1'; McQuoid 59'	Report	Watkins 86'	Stadium: Ricoh Arena; Attendance: 7,273 (486 away); Referee: Andrew Madley

12 November 2014 Area Quarter-Final	Coventry City	2–0	Plymouth Argyle	Coventry
19:45	Maddison (yellow card) 26'; Madine 61'; Barton (yellow card) 84'; Nouble 85'; Webster (yellow card) 90'	BBC Report		Stadium: Ricoh Arena; Attendance: 7,121; Referee: James Adcock

10 December 2014 Area Semi-Final	Bristol City	2–0	Coventry City	Bristol
19:45	Williams 30'; Wilbraham 75'	Report	Johnson (yellow card) 29'; O'Brien (yellow card) 58'	Stadium: Ashton Gate; Attendance: 5,019; Referee: Steve Martin

== League One data ==
=== League table ===
A total of 24 teams contest the division: 17 sides remaining in the division from last season, three relegated from the Championship, and four promoted from League Two.

Pos	Team	Pld	W	D	L	GF	GA	GD	Pts
15	Oldham Athletic	46	14	15	17	54	67	−13	57
16	Scunthorpe United	46	14	14	18	62	75	−13	56
17	Coventry City	46	13	16	17	49	60	−11	55
18	Port Vale	46	15	9	22	55	65	−10	54
19	Colchester United	46	14	10	22	58	77	−19	52

Updated to match(es) played on 3 May 2015. Source: BBC Sport
Rules for classification: 1) Points; 2) Goal difference; 3) Number of goals scored

=== Results summary ===
Overall								Home						Away					
Pld	W	D	L	GF	GA	GD	Pts	W	D	L	GF	GA	GD	W	D	L	GF	GA	GD
46	13	16	17	49	60	−11	55	6	9	8	25	33	−8	7	7	9	24	27	−3

Last updated: 3 May 2015.
Source: CCFC League One Results

=== Round by round ===
Round	1	2	3	4	5	6	7	8	9	10	11	12	13	14	15	16	17	18	19	20	21	22	23	24	25	26	27	28	29	30	31	32	33	34	35	36	37	38	39	40	41	42	43	44	45	46
Ground	A	H	H	A	A	H	H	A	A	H	H	A	H	A	H	A	H	A	H	A	H	A	H	A	H	A	A	H	A	H	A	H	A	H	H	A	A	H	A	H	A	H	H	A	H	A
Result	L	W	D	D	D	W	W	L	L	L	D	L	L	L	W	D	L	W	D	W	D	L	D	W	L	L	D	D	L	D	D	W	L	L	D	W	W	L	W	L	D	W	D	D	L	W
Position	16	14	14	15	15	8	5	8	11	14	15	15	17	20	17	19	20	18	18	14	17	19	17	16	18	18	17	19	20	20	21	20	20	20	20	20	18	18	17	17	18	16	16	16	18	17

Updated to match(es) played on 3 May 2015. Source: League One Results
A = Away; H = Home; W = Win; D = Draw; L = Loss

=== Scores overview ===
Opposition	Home Score	Away Score	Double
Barnsley	2 – 2	0 – 1	No
Bradford City	1 – 1	2 – 3	No
Bristol City	1 – 3	0 – 0	No
Chesterfield	0 – 0	3 – 2	No
Colchester United	1 – 0	1 – 0	Yes
Crawley Town	2 – 2	2 – 1	No
Crewe Alexandra	1 – 3	1 – 2	No
Doncaster Rovers	1 – 3	0 – 2	No
Fleetwood Town	1 – 1	2 – 0	No
Gillingham	1 – 0	1 – 3	No
Leyton Orient	0 – 1	2 – 2	No
MK Dons	2 – 1	0 – 0	No
Notts County	0 – 1	0 – 0	No
Oldham Athletic	1 – 1	1 – 4	No
Peterborough United	3 – 2	1 – 0	Yes
Port Vale	2 – 3	2 – 0	No
Preston North End	0 – 2	0 – 1	No
Rochdale	2 – 2	0 – 1	No
Scunthorpe United	1 – 1	1 – 2	No
Sheffield United	1 – 0	2 – 2	No
Swindon Town	0 – 3	1 – 1	No
Walsall	0 – 0	2 – 0	No
Yeovil Town	2 – 1	0 – 0	No

== Season statistics ==
=== Appearances and goals ===
As of 19 April 2015

No.	Pos	Nat	Player	Total		League One		FA Cup		League Cup		League Trophy	
No.	Pos	Nat	Player	Apps	Goals	Apps	Goals	Apps	Goals	Apps	Goals	Apps	Goals
1	GK	(England) ENG	Lee Burge	21	0	17+0	0	1+0	0	1+0	0	2+0	0
2	DF	(England) ENG	Jordan Willis	39	0	32+1	0	1+0	0	1+0	0	4+0	0
3 d	DF	(England) ENG	Danny Pugh	7	0	5+0	0	0+0	0	1+0	0	1+0	0
4	DF	(Scotland) SCO	Andy Webster	33	0	25+4	0	0+0	0	1+0	0	3+0	0
5	DF	(Benin) BEN	Réda Johnson	21	6	19+0	5	1+0	1	0+0	0	1+0	0
6	MF	(England) ENG	Conor Thomas	19	0	13+3	0	0+0	0	0+0	0	2+1	0
7	MF	(Scotland) SCO	John Fleck	47	0	42+1	0	0+0	0	1+0	0	3+0	0
8	MF	(England) ENG	Grant Ward (on loan from Tottenham Hotspur)	10	0	10+0	0	0+0	0	0+0	0	0+0	0
9	FW	(Germany) GER	Nick Proschwitz (on loan from Brentford)	8	1	5+3	1	0+0	0	0+0	0	0+0	0
10	MF	(Scotland) SCO	Danny Swanson (on loan to St Johnstone)	18	0	8+7	0	0+0	0	1+0	0	2+0	0
11	MF	(Scotland) SCO	Jim O'Brien	47	6	42+1	6	1+0	0	1+0	0	2+0	0
12	FW	(Canada) CAN	Simeon Jackson	30	3	12+16	3	1+0	0	0+0	0	1+0	0
14	FW	(England) ENG	Dominic Samuel (on loan from Reading)	13	6	12+1	6	0+0	0	0+0	0	0+0	0
15	FW	(England) ENG	Shaun Miller (on loan to Crawley Town & York City)	13	2	1+11	1	0+0	0	0+1	1	0+0	0
16	MF	(Republic of Ireland) IRL	Adam Barton	29	0	23+3	0	1+0	0	0+0	0	2+0	0
17	MF	(England) ENG	Sanmi Odelusi (on loan from Bolton Wanderers)	13	3	4+9	3	0+0	0	0+0	0	0+0	0
18	DF	(England) ENG	Aaron Phillips	22	2	14+5	0	0+0	0	0+0	0	3+0	2
19	FW	(England) ENG	Frank Nouble (loaned from Ipswich Town)	33	7	28+2	6	1+0	0	0+0	0	0+2	1
20	FW	(England) ENG	Marcus Tudgay	22	3	17+4	3	0+1	0	0+0	0	0+0	0
21	DF	(England) ENG	Aaron Martin (loaned from Yeovil Town)	26	0	25+0	0	1+0	0	0+0	0	0+0	0
22	DF	(England) ENG	Matthew Pennington (on loan from Everton)	25	0	24+0	0	0+0	0	0+0	0	1+0	0
23	MF	(England) ENG	Blair Turgott	3	1	0+3	1	0+0	0	0+0	0	0+0	0
24	MF	(Sierra Leone) SLE	Al Bangura	0	0	0+0	0	0+0	0	0+0	0	0+0	0
26	DF	(England) ENG	Ryan Haynes	31	1	20+6	1	1+0	0	0+1	0	2+1	0
27	MF	(England) ENG	Jack Finch	21	0	8+8	0	1+0	0	1+0	0	3+0	0
28	MF	(England) ENG	Ivor Lawton	0	0	0+0	0	0+0	0	0+0	0	0+0	0
30	DF	(England) ENG	Chris Stokes (on loan from Forest Green Rovers)	15	1	15+0	1	0+0	0	0+0	0	0+0	0
33	GK	(England) ENG	Reice Charles-Cook (loaned to Nuneaton Town)	0	0	0+0	0	0+0	0	0+0	0	0+0	0
35	DF	(England) ENG	Dion Kelly-Evans	0	0	0+0	0	0+0	0	0+0	0	0+0	0
36	MF	(England) ENG	James Maddison	16	1	2+8	1	1+0	0	0+1	0	1+3	0
37	MF	(Wales) WAL	George Thomas	7	0	0+6	0	0+0	0	0+0	0	0+1	0
38	MF	(Scotland) SCO	Kyle Spence	1	0	0+0	0	0+0	0	0+0	0	0+1	0
39	DF	(England) ENG	Devon Kelly-Evans	0	0	0+0	0	0+0	0	0+0	0	0+0	0
43	GK	(England) ENG	Jake Richards	0	0	0+0	0	0+0	0	0+0	0	0+0	0
Players who left before the season ended:
8	MF	(England) ENG	Carl Baker	0	0	0+0	0	0+0	0	0+0	0	0+0	0
8	FW	(England) ENG	Gary Madine (loaned from Sheffield Wednesday)	13	4	11+0	3	0+0	0	0+0	0	2+0	1
8	MF	(England) ENG	Luke Williams (loaned from Middlesbrough)	5	0	4+1	0	0+0	0	0+0	0	0+0	0
9	FW	(Northern Ireland) NIR	Josh McQuoid (loaned from Bournemouth)	19	5	12+2	3	0+1	0	1+0	0	3+0	2
14	MF	(Senegal) SEN	Mohamed Coulibaly (loaned from Bournemouth)	6	0	1+3	0	0+0	0	0+0	0	2+0	0
17	MF	(England) ENG	Billy Daniels	4	0	0+2	0	0+0	0	1+0	0	1+0	0
23	GK	(England) ENG	Ryan Allsop (loaned from Bournemouth)	27	0	24+0	0	0+1	0	0+0	0	2+0	0
23	GK	(England) ENG	Jamie Jones (loaned from Preston North End)	4	0	4+0	0	0+0	0	0+0	0	0+0	0
24	DF	(England) ENG	Jordan Clarke (loaned to Yeovil Town)	14	1	10+1	1	0+0	0	1+0	0	1+1	0
25	DF	(England) ENG	Seb Hines (loaned from Middlesbrough)	9	0	6+3	0	0+0	0	0+0	0	0+0	0

=== Goalscorers ===
No.	Flag	Pos	Name	League One	FA Cup	League Cup	Football League Trophy	Total
19	(England)	FW	Frank Nouble	6	0	0	1	7
5	(Benin)	DF	Réda Johnson	5	1	0	0	6
11	(Scotland)	MF	Jim O'Brien	6	0	0	0	6
14	(England)	FW	Dominic Samuel	6	0	0	0	6
9	(Northern Ireland)	FW	Josh McQuoid	3	0	0	2	5
8	(England)	FW	Gary Madine	3	0	0	1	4
20	(England)	FW	Marcus Tudgay	4	0	0	0	4
12	(Canada)	FW	Simeon Jackson	3	0	0	0	3
17	(England)	FW	Sanmi Odelusi	3	0	0	0	3
15	(England)	FW	Shaun Miller	1	0	1	0	2
18	(England)	DF	Aaron Phillips	0	0	0	2	2
36	(England)	MF	James Maddison	2	0	0	0	2
9	(Germany)	FW	Nick Proschwitz	1	0	0	0	1
23	(England)	MF	Blair Turgott	1	0	0	0	1
24	(England)	DF	Jordan Clarke	1	0	0	0	1
26	(England)	DF	Ryan Haynes	1	0	0	0	1
30	(England)	DF	Chris Stokes	1	0	0	0	1

=== Assists ===
No.	Flag	Pos	Name	League One	FA Cup	League Cup	Football League Trophy	Total
11	(Scotland)	MF	Jim O'Brien	8	0	0	1	9
7	(Scotland)	MF	John Fleck	4	0	0	0	4
19	(England)	FW	Frank Nouble	3	0	0	0	3
3	(England)	DF	Danny Pugh	1	0	0	1	2
8	(England)	FW	Gary Madine	2	0	0	0	2
12	(Canada)	FW	Simeon Jackson	1	0	0	1	2
26	(England)	DF	Ryan Haynes	1	0	1	0	2
2	(England)	DF	Jordan Willis	1	0	0	0	1
8	(England)	MF	Grant Ward	1	0	0	0	1
8	(England)	MF	Luke Williams	1	0	0	0	1
9	(Northern Ireland)	FW	Josh McQuoid	1	0	0	0	1
18	(England)	DF	Aaron Phillips	1	0	0	0	1
22	(England)	DF	Matthew Pennington	1	0	0	0	1
23	(England)	GK	Jamie Jones	1	0	0	0	1
30	(England)	DF	Chris Stokes	1	0	0	0	1
36	(England)	MF	James Maddison	0	1	0	0	1

=== Yellow cards ===
No.	Flag	Pos	Name	League One	FA Cup	League Cup	Football League Trophy	Total
6	(England)	MF	Conor Thomas	4	0	0	1	5
7	(Scotland)	MF	John Fleck	4	0	0	0	4
5	(Benin)	DF	Réda Johnson	4	0	0	0	4
24	(England)	DF	Jordan Clarke	2	0	0	0	2
14	(Senegal)	MF	Mohamed Coulibaly	2	0	0	0	2
27	(England)	MF	Jack Finch	1	1	0	1	3
25	(England)	MF	Seb Hines	2	0	0	0	2
4	(Scotland)	DF	Andy Webster	1	0	0	1	2
16	(England)	MF	Adam Barton	1	0	0	1	2
18	(England)	DF	Aaron Phillips	1	0	0	1	2
9	(Northern Ireland)	FW	Josh McQuoid	1	0	0	0	1
23	(England)	GK	Ryan Allsop	1	0	0	0	1
10	(Scotland)	MF	Danny Swanson	1	0	0	0	1
26	(England)	DF	Ryan Haynes	1	0	0	0	1
1	(England)	GK	Lee Burge	1	0	0	0	1
20	(England)	FW	Marcus Tudgay	0	1	0	0	1
36	(England)	MF	James Maddison	0	0	0	1	1

=== Red cards ===
No.	Flag	Pos	Name	League One	FA Cup	League Cup	Football League Trophy	Total
5	(Benin)	DF	Réda Johnson	1	0	0	0	1
27	(England)	MF	Jack Finch	1	0	0	0	1
1	(England)	GK	Lee Burge	0	1	0	0	1
36	(England)	MF	James Maddison	1	0	0	0	1
16	(England)	MF	Adam Barton	1	0	0	0	1

=== Captains ===
No.	Pos.	Name	Starts
5	DF	(Benin) Réda Johnson	11
4	DF	(Scotland) Andy Webster	7
2	DF	(England) Jordan Willis	2
11	MF	(Scotland) Jim O'Brien	1

=== Penalties awarded ===
Date	Success?	Penalty Taker	Opponent	Competition
9 Nov 2014	✗	(Benin) Réda Johnson	Worcester City	FA Cup
3 Jan 2015	✗	(England) Marcus Tudgay	Walsall	League One
17 Jan 2015	✓	(England) Gary Madine	Gillingham	League One
24 Jan 2015	✗	(England) Gary Madine	Yeovil Town	League One
3 May 2015	✗	(Germany) Nick Proschwitz	Crawley Town	League One

=== Suspensions served ===
Date	Matches Missed	Suspended Player	Reason	Missed Opponents
20 September 2014	3	(Benin) Réda Johnson	(red card) vs. Scunthorpe United	Rochdale (A), Preston North End (H), Crawley Town (H)
18 October 2014	1	(England) Jack Finch	(yellow card) (yellow-red card) vs. Crewe Alexandra	Bristol City (H)
9 November 2014	3	(England) Lee Burge	(red card) vs. Worcester City	Plymouth Argyle (H), Notts County (H), Colchester United (A)
14 March 2015	1	(England) James Maddison	(yellow card) (yellow-red card) vs. Doncaster Rovers	Chesterfield (A)
14 March 2015	1	(Republic of Ireland) Adam Barton	(yellow card) (yellow-red card) vs. Doncaster Rovers	Chesterfield (A)

=== Monthly & weekly awards ===
Award	Date	Player
Football League Team of the Week	10 August 2014	(Benin) Réda Johnson
Football League Team of the Week	7 September 2014	(England) Ryan Haynes
Football League Team of the Week	3 November 2014	(Scotland) Jim O'Brien
Football League Team of the Week	13 April 2015	(Scotland) Jim O'Brien

=== End-of-season awards ===
Award	Winner
Top Goalscorer	(England) Frank Nouble
Players' Player of the Season	(Scotland) John Fleck
Goal of the Season	(Scotland) Jim O'Brien
Player of the Season	(Scotland) Jim O'Brien
Young Player of the Season	(England) Matthew Pennington
Community Player of the Season	(Benin) Réda Johnson

=== International appearances ===
Date	No.	Pos.	Name	Match	Stats	Caps
20 July 2014		DF	(Benin) Réda Johnson	Benin 1–0 Malawi		
10 September 2014	12	FW	(Canada) Simeon Jackson	Canada 3 – 1 Jamaica	35 Minutes	40

=== Overall ===
Games played	52 (46 League One, 1 FA Cup, 1 League Cup, 4 Football League Trophy)
Games won	16 (13 League One, 0 FA Cup, 0 League Cup, 3 Football League Trophy)
Games drawn	16 (16 League One, 0 FA Cup, 0 League Cup, 0 Football League Trophy)
Games lost	20 (17 League One, 1 FA Cup, 1 League Cup, 1 Football League Trophy)
Goals scored	56 (49 League One, 1 FA Cup, 1 League Cup, 6 Football League Trophy)
Goals conceded	67 (60 League One, 2 FA Cup, 2 League Cup, 3 Football League Trophy)
Goal difference	-11
Yellow cards	80 (71 League One, 2 FA Cup, 0 League Cup, 7 Football League Trophy)
Red cards	5 (4 League One, 1 FA Cup, 0 League Cup, 0 Football League Trophy)
Worst discipline	(Benin) Réda Johnson (6 (yellow card) , 1 (red card) )
Best result	W 3–1 (H) v Exeter City – Football League Trophy – 7 October 2014
Worst result	L 4–1 (A) v Oldham Athletic – Football League One – 21 October 2014
Most appearances	(Scotland) John Fleck & (Republic of Ireland) Jim O'Brien (47)
Top scorer	(England) Frank Nouble (7)
Points	55 / 138

== Transfers ==
=== Transfers in ===
Player	From	Date	Fee	Ref.
(Scotland) Danny Swanson	(England) Peterborough United	3 July 2014	Free	
(Scotland) Jim O'Brien	(England) Barnsley	4 July 2014	Free	
(Benin) Réda Johnson	(England) Sheffield Wednesday	4 July 2014	Free	
(England) Shaun Miller	(England) Sheffield United	16 July 2014	Free	
(England) Danny Pugh	(England) Leeds United	16 July 2014	Free	
(England) Marcus Tudgay	(England) Nottingham Forest	29 July 2014	Free	
(England) Reice Charles-Cook	(England) Bury	1 August 2014	Free	
(Canada) Simeon Jackson	(England) Millwall	18 August 2014	Free	
(England) Aaron Martin	(England) Yeovil Town	9 January 2015	Free	
(England) Frank Nouble	(England) Ipswich Town	9 January 2015	Free	
(England) Blair Turgott	(England) West Ham United	2 February 2015	Free	
(Sierra Leone) Al Bangura	(England) Forest Green Rovers	20 March 2015	Free	

=== Transfers out ===
Player	To	Date	Fee	Ref.
(Republic of Ireland) Joe Murphy	(England) Huddersfield Town	1 July 2014	Free	
(England) Blair Adams	(England) Notts County	1 July 2014	Free	
(England) Cyrus Christie	(England) Derby County	1 July 2014	Undisclosed	
(Belgium) Franck Moussa	(England) Charlton Athletic	1 July 2014	Free	
(England) Mark Marshall	(England) Port Vale	1 July 2014	Free	
(Scotland) Alex Gott	(United States) Eckerd Tritons	1 July 2014	Free	
(England) Ryan Smith	(England) Nuneaton Town	1 July 2014	Free	
(England) Jordan Smith		1 July 2014	Free	
(England) Ryan Quinn	(England) Nuneaton Town	1 July 2014	Free	
(Zimbabwe) Eli Bako	(England) Ilkeston	1 July 2014	Free	
(England) Jordan Forrester	(Sweden) Ånge IF	1 July 2014	Free	
(England) Courtney Baker-Richardson	(England) Romulus	1 July 2014	Free	
(Scotland) Lewis Rankin	(England) Rugby Town	1 July 2014	Free	
(England) Ben Maund	(England) Worcester City	1 July 2014	Free	
(England) Louis Garner		1 July 2014	Free	
(England) Callum Wilson	(England) Bournemouth	4 July 2014	Undisclosed	
(England) Danny Seaborne	(Scotland) Partick Thistle	8 August 2014	Free	
(Scotland) Stuart Urquhart	(Scotland) Dunfermline Athletic	18 August 2014	Free	
(England) Carl Baker	(England) Milton Keynes Dons	1 September 2014	Free	
(England) Jordan Clarke	(England) Scunthorpe United	9 January 2015	Undisclosed	
(England) Billy Daniels	(England) Notts County	15 January 2015	Undisclosed	

=== Loans in ===
Player	From	Date from	Date to	Ref.
(England) Ryan Allsop	(England) Bournemouth	4 July 2014	20 January 2015	
(Senegal) Mohamed Coulibaly	(England) Bournemouth	4 July 2014	13 November 2014	
(Northern Ireland) Josh McQuoid	(England) Bournemouth	4 August 2014	20 January 2015	
(England) Seb Hines	(England) Middlesbrough	1 September 2014	4 January 2015	
(England) Frank Nouble	(England) Ipswich Town	1 September 2014	4 January 2015	
(England) Aaron Martin	(England) Yeovil Town	29 October 2014	5 January 2015	
(England) Gary Madine	(England) Sheffield Wednesday	30 October 2014	30 January 2015	
(England) Matthew Pennington	(England) Everton	27 November 2014	30 June 2015	
(England) Jamie Jones	(England) Preston North End	23 January 2015	23 February 2015	
(England) Dominic Samuel	(England) Reading	29 January 2015	28 April 2015	
(England) Sanmi Odelusi	(England) Bolton Wanderers	31 January 2015	30 June 2015	
(England) Luke Williams	(England) Middlesbrough	2 February 2015	12 March 2015	
(England) Chris Stokes	(England) Forest Green Rovers	21 February 2015	30 June 2015	
(Germany) Nick Proschwitz	(England) Brentford	27 February 2015	30 June 2015	
(England) Grant Ward	(England) Tottenham Hotspur	13 March 2015	30 June 2015	

=== Loans out ===
Player	To	Date from	Date to	Ref.
(England) Reice Charles-Cook	(England) Nuneaton Town	1 August 2014	1 January 2015	
(England) Jordan Clarke	(England) Yeovil Town	29 October 2014	5 January 2015	
(England) Shaun Miller	(England) Crawley Town	27 November 2014	28 December 2014	
(Scotland) Danny Swanson	(Scotland) St Johnstone	2 February 2015	30 June 2015	
(England) Shaun Miller	(England) York City	26 March 2015	30 June 2015	

=== Trials ===
Player	From	Date	Signed	Ref.
(England) Shaun Miller	(England) Sheffield United	July 2014	Yes	
(England) Marcus Tudgay	(England) Nottingham Forest	July 2014	Yes	
(Scotland) Brian McLean	(Scotland) Ross County	July 2014	No	
(Jamaica) Nyron Nosworthy	(England) Watford	September 2014	No	
(England) Chris Stokes	(England) Forest Green Rovers	February 2015	Yes	
(Sierra Leone) Al Bangura	(England) Forest Green Rovers	March 2015	Yes	
