= Frank Nouble =

English footballer (born 1991)

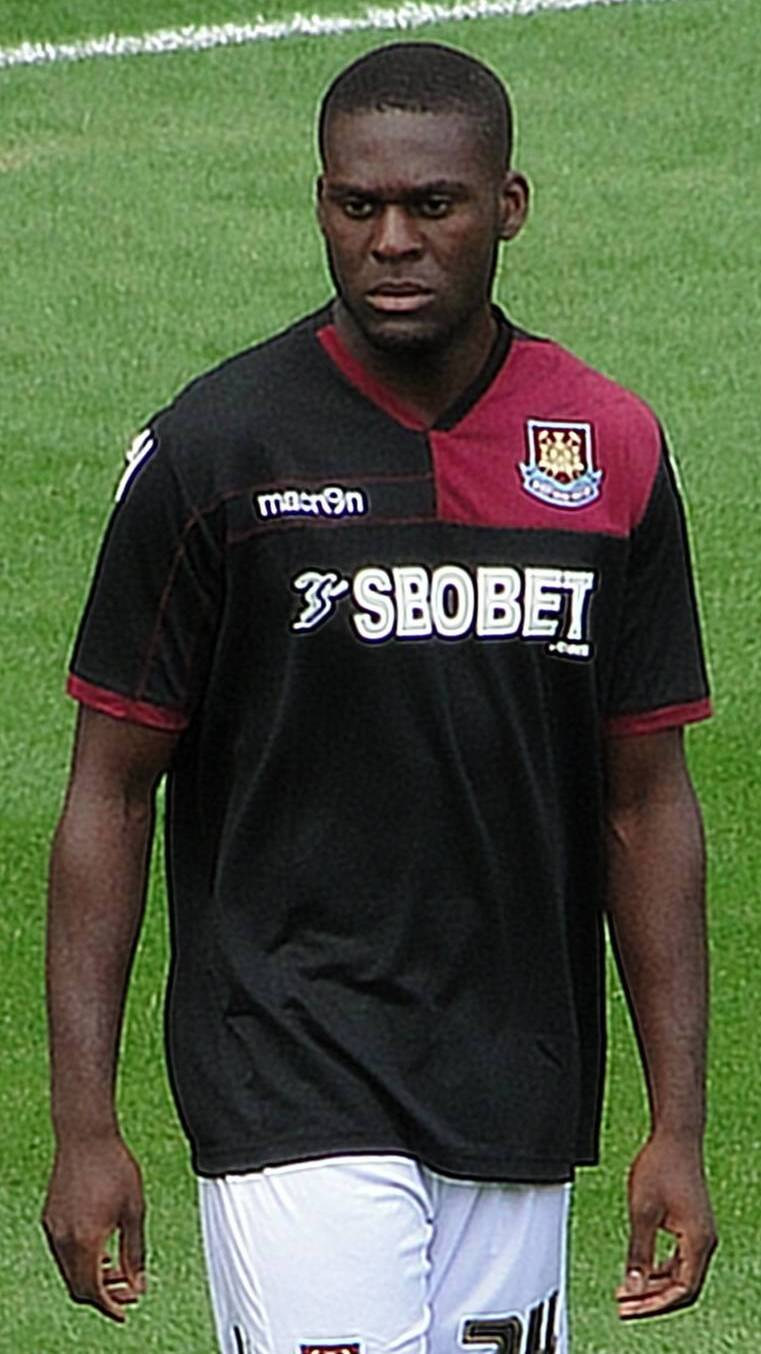
- Nouble warming up for West Ham United in August 2011

Personal information
- Full name: Frank Herman Nouble
- Date of birth: 24 September 1991 (age 35)
- Place of birth: Lewisham, London, England
- Height: 6 ft 3 in (1.91 m)
- Position: Striker

Team information
- Current team: Stockton Town

Youth career
- 2004–2009: Chelsea

Senior career*
| Years | Team | Apps | (Gls) |
| 2009–2012 | West Ham United | 13 | (1) |
| 2010 | → West Bromwich Albion (loan) | 3 | (0) |
| 2010 | → Swindon Town (loan) | 8 | (0) |
| 2010 | → Swansea City (loan) | 6 | (1) |
| 2011 | → Barnsley (loan) | 4 | (0) |
| 2011 | → Charlton Athletic (loan) | 9 | (1) |
| 2011 | → Gillingham (loan) | 13 | (5) |
| 2012 | → Barnsley (loan) | 6 | (0) |
| 2012–2013 | Wolverhampton Wanderers | 2 | (0) |
| 2013–2015 | Ipswich Town | 56 | (4) |
| 2014–2015 | → Coventry City (loan) | 12 | (3) |
| 2015 | Coventry City | 19 | (3) |
| 2015–2016 | Tianjin Songjiang | 15 | (3) |
| 2016 | → Nei Mongol Zhongyou (loan) | 0 | (0) |
| 2016–2017 | Gillingham | 12 | (1) |
| 2017 | Southend United | 5 | (0) |
| 2017–2018 | Newport County | 45 | (9) |
| 2018–2020 | Colchester United | 79 | (14) |
| 2020–2021 | Plymouth Argyle | 24 | (1) |
| 2021 | → Colchester United (loan) | 20 | (3) |
| 2021–2023 | Colchester United | 39 | (2) |
| 2022 | → Leyton Orient (loan) | 8 | (0) |
| 2023 | Torquay United | 9 | (3) |
| 2023–2025 | Yeovil Town | 80 | (13) |
| 2025–2026 | Gateshead | 30 | (3) |
| 2026 | Spennymoor Town | 11 | (0) |
| 2026– | Stockton Town | 0 | (0) |

International career^{‡}
| 2008 | England U17 | 1 | (0) |
| 2009–2010 | England U19 | 8 | (2) |
- * Club domestic league appearances and goals as of 13:51, 24 May 2026 (UTC) ‡ National team caps and goals as of 16:50, 27 July 2010 (UTC)

Frank Herman Nouble (born 24 September 1991) is an English professional footballer who plays as a striker for Northern Premier League Premier Division club Stockton Town.

Nouble started his career with the youth team at Chelsea before signing for West Ham United. While at West Ham, he was loaned out on seven occasions. Nouble made five appearances for Wolverhampton Wanderers before signing for Ipswich Town in 2013. After 18 months at Ipswich he was loaned to Coventry City and in January 2015 signed for the club on a free transfer. In June 2015 he moved to China to play for Tianjin Songjiang, returning to England in October 2016 to sign for Gillingham. He then had a short spell with Southend United before joining Newport County in July 2017. He signed for Colchester United in June 2018. In August 2020, he joined Plymouth Argyle. In June 2021, he re-signed for Colchester United.

Nouble has played international football for England at both under-17 and under-19 levels.

== Club career ==
=== West Ham United ===
Born in Lewisham, London, to Ivorian parents, Nouble started with Chelsea in youth team football at under-12 level and was a regular in their youth team for the 2007–08 season. He made his Chelsea reserve team debut in November 2007.

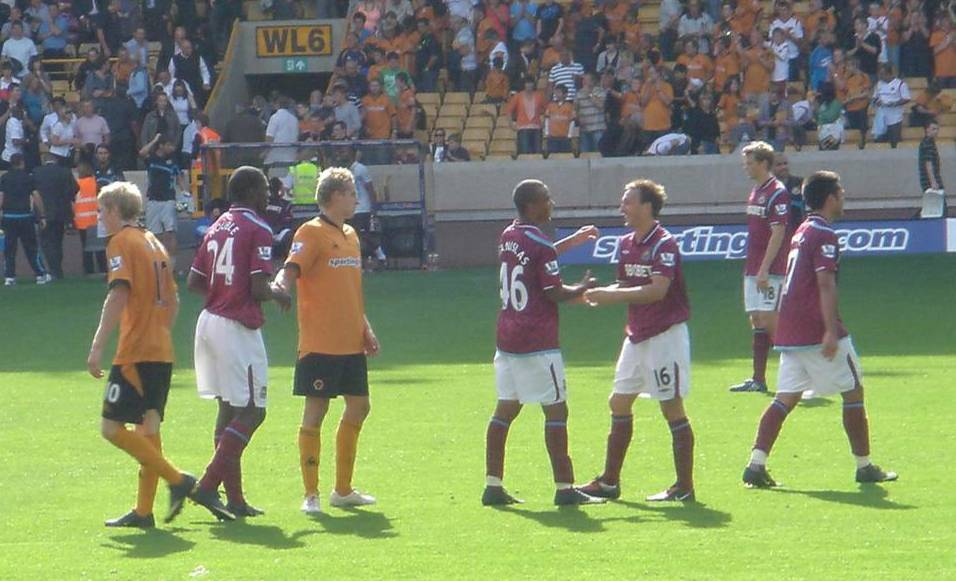
Nouble (second from left) at the end of his debut game against Wolverhampton Wanderers

In July 2009 he rejected the offer of a professional contract with Chelsea and on 21 July signed a five-year contract with West Ham United for an undisclosed fee. He made his Premier League and West Ham debut in their 2–0 away win against Wolverhampton Wanderers on 15 August 2009, coming on as a substitute for Carlton Cole. His first league start for West Ham came on 17 January 2010 in a 0–0 draw, away against Aston Villa.

He joined West Bromwich Albion on an initial one-month loan deal on 8 February 2010. He made his debut on 9 February 2010 at home against Scunthorpe United and made three appearances in total for West Bromwich Albion. He then joined Swindon Town in March 2010 on a one-month emergency loan deal as a boost to Town's striking options due to injuries to Billy Paynter and Vincent Pericard. He made his debut for Swindon on 20 March against Norwich City. In April 2010 his loan was extended until the end of the 2009–10 season. He had made eight appearances for Swindon.

In September 2010 Nouble joined Swansea City on a three-month loan contract. Manager Brendan Rodgers said of him "...Frank has stature, presence, burning pace and wants to score goals. He has some Premier League experience and this is a chance for him to be part of a terrific squad and prove he can come and play and work well at this level." He made his debut on 18 September in a 2–0 home win against Scunthorpe United, and scored his first goal in senior football on 28 September 2010 in a 3–2 win against Watford, coming off the bench to score with his first touch of the game. Following growing injury concerns at West Ham, Nouble's loan was cut short in October 2010 and he returned to Upton Park. In January 2011, Nouble signed for Barnsley on loan until the end of the 2010–11 season. He made his debut the following day in a 2–0 win against Preston North End. In March 2011, Barnsley manager Mark Robins decided not to extend Nouble's loan with Barnsley and he returned to West Ham. On 11 March 2011, Nouble joined League One club Charlton Athletic on a month-long loan. He made his debut for Charlton in the 0–1 home defeat against Brentford on 12 March 2011 and scored his first Charlton goal on 19 March in their 2–1 away defeat against Dagenham and Redbridge.

On 15 September 2011, Nouble signed on loan for Gillingham for an initial one-month period, scoring on his debut as the Gills won 6–1 at Hereford United. Gillingham manager Andy Hessenthaler praised Nouble saying, "He looks good. He's hungry and young and has decent pedigree with his Premier League experience and gives us another option." After a successful first month his loan deal was extended by a further month. His loan was then extended by one final month until 17 December.

On 31 December 2011, Nouble scored his first and only goal for West Ham at Pride Park in a 2–1 defeat to Derby County. Two days before the January 2012 transfer window closed, League Two club Crawley Town made a bid for Nouble, which was accepted by West Ham United but rejected by the player. In March 2012 Nouble joined Barnsley for a second loan period, on a one-month loan deal. At the end of the 2011–12 season, Nouble was released by West Ham when his contract expired.

=== Wolverhampton Wanderers ===
On 22 June 2012, Nouble signed for Championship club Wolverhampton Wanderers as a free agent, signing a two-year deal. He scored his first and only goal for Wolves against Northampton Town in the League Cup on 30 August. Nouble was rarely utilised, making just five appearances before his stay at Molineux came to an end.

=== Ipswich Town ===
On 8 January 2013, Nouble signed for another Championship club when he joined Ipswich Town for an undisclosed fee, believed to be around £25,000, signing an eighteen-month contract. He made his debut on 12 January, in a 0–0 draw against Cardiff City, and scored his first goals when he scored twice in a 3–0 win over Crystal Palace on 16 April 2013.

During his year-and-a-half with Ipswich, Nouble made 60 appearances, most of which came from the substitutes bench, and contributed five goals.

=== Coventry City ===
On 1 September 2014, Nouble signed for League One club Coventry City on a short-term loan from Ipswich until January 2015. He made his debut and scored his first goal for Coventry against Gillingham on 5 September 2014, a game which Coventry won 1–0.

On 7 January 2015 Nouble was released from his contract by Ipswich Town and signed a 6-month permanent contract with Coventry City two days later. He was released by Coventry at the end of the 2014–15 season.

=== Tianjin Songjiang ===
On 15 June 2015, Nouble confirmed he had signed for China League One side Tianjin Songjiang on a two-year contract. He scored three goals during his time with the club as one of three foreign players in the squad. On 31 December 2015, Nouble was loaned to fellow China League One side Nei Mongol Zhongyou until 31 December 2016 but failed to make an appearance for the club after falling out of favour.

=== Gillingham ===
In October 2016, Nouble re-joined his former loan club Gillingham on a short-term contract. He scored his first goals of his second spell with the club in a 2–2 draw with Brackley Town of the National League North in the FA Cup on 5 November 2016. After three goals in 13 games, he was released by the club at the end of his short-term contract in January 2017.

=== Southend United ===
On 18 January 2017, Nouble signed a short-term deal with Southend United until the end of the 2016–17 season following a successful trial. He made his club debut on 28 January as a substitute during Southend's 1–1 draw at Fleetwood Town. He was released by the club at the end of his contract.

=== Newport County ===
On 28 June 2017, Nouble signed a one-year contract with League Two club Newport County. He made his debut for Newport on the opening day of the 2017–18 season, scoring the first goal in a 3–3 draw with Stevenage. On 26 August 2017, he scored a 13-minute hat-trick in a League Two match versus Chesterfield, scoring the first three goals in a 4–1 win. He completed his season at Newport with his best return in a single season so far, ten goals in 52 appearances.

=== Colchester United ===
Following the expiry of his contract with Newport County, Nouble signed for League Two rivals Colchester United on a two-year deal on 8 June 2018. He made his competitive debut for Colchester on 4 August in a 0–0 draw with Notts County. He scored his first Colchester goal on 15 September in their 3–0 win against Cambridge United. On 28 April 2020 Colchester confirmed that Nouble would be released at the end his contract in June 2020.

=== Plymouth Argyle ===
Following his release by Colchester, Nouble joined League One club Plymouth Argyle on 3 August 2020. He scored on his debut, the winner in a 3–2 EFL Cup win against Queens Park Rangers on 5 September.

On 1 February 2021, Nouble re-joined Colchester on loan until the end of the season. He made his second club debut on 6 February in a 0–0 draw with Leyton Orient. He scored his first goal of his loan spell on 14 February, an 89th-minute equaliser in a 2–2 draw with Mansfield Town.

=== Colchester United third spell ===
Following the expiry of his contract with Plymouth Argyle, Nouble re-signed for Colchester United on 18 June 2021 on a two-year deal. He made his third Colchester debut on 7 August 2021 in their 0–0 draw at Carlisle United.

On 17 March 2023, Nouble left the club by mutual consent.

==== Leyton Orient (loan) ====
On 31 January 2022, Nouble joined Leyton Orient on loan until the end of the 2021–22 season.

=== Torquay United ===
On 23 March 2023, he joined National League club Torquay United on a short-term contract until the end of the season.

=== Yeovil Town ===
On 3 July 2023, Nouble joined Yeovil Town on a two year deal. Nouble won the National League South with the club 2023-24, scoring 11 league goals to help Yeovil to the title.

=== Gateshead ===
On 22 March 2025, Nouble signed for fellow National League side Gateshead on a deal until the end of the 2025–26 season.

In January 2026, he terminated his playing contract by mutual consent, remaining with the club as a first-team coach.

=== Spennymoor Town ===
On 28 January 2026, Nouble joined National League North club Spennmoor Town on a deal until the end of the season. Nouble left Spennymoor at the end of the 2025–26 season following the expiry of his short-term contract.

=== Stockton Town ===
On 24 May 2026, Nouble joined Northern Premier League Premier Division side Stockton Town.

== International career ==
Having previously been capped at England under-17 level Nouble made his first appearance for the England under-19 side on 8 October 2009 in a 3–1 victory against Finland under-19 in a UEFA under 19 championship qualifying round game in Slovenia.

On 18 July 2010, Nouble scored twice for the Young Lions in their 3–2 defeat of Austria in the UEFA European Under-19 Championship being played in France. He made eight appearances in total for the under-19s.

== Personal life ==
Nouble's younger brother Joel Nouble, is also a professional footballer who most recently played as a forward for Livingston.

Nouble went to Bacon's College in Rotherhithe, South London.

== Career statistics ==
As of end of 2025–26 season

Appearances and goals by club, season and competition
| Club | Season | League | | | National Cup (Note: Includes FA Cup) | | League Cup (Note: Includes EFL Cup) | | Other | | Total | |
| Club | Season | Division | Apps | Goals | Apps | Goals | Apps | Goals | Apps | Goals | Apps | Goals |
|---|---|---|---|---|---|---|---|---|---|---|---|---|
| West Ham United | 2009–10 | Premier League | 8 | 0 | 1 | 0 | 1 | 0 | — | | 10 | 0 |
| West Ham United | 2010–11 | Premier League | 2 | 0 | 2 | 0 | 0 | 0 | — | | 4 | 0 |
| West Ham United | 2011–12 | Championship | 3 | 1 | 1 | 0 | 1 | 0 | 0 | 0 | 5 | 1 |
| West Ham United | Total | | 13 | 1 | 4 | 0 | 2 | 0 | 0 | 0 | 19 | 1 |
| West Bromwich Albion (loan) | 2009–10 | Championship | 3 | 0 | — | | — | | — | | 3 | 0 |
| Swindon Town (loan) | 2009–10 | League One | 8 | 0 | — | | — | | — | | 8 | 0 |
| Swansea City (loan) | 2010–11 | Championship | 6 | 1 | — | | — | | — | | 6 | 1 |
| Barnsley (loan) | 2010–11 | Championship | 4 | 0 | — | | — | | — | | 4 | 0 |
| Charlton Athletic (loan) | 2010–11 | League One | 9 | 1 | — | | — | | — | | 9 | 1 |
| Gillingham (loan) | 2011–12 | League Two | 13 | 5 | — | | — | | 1 (Note: Appearance in Football League Trophy) | 0 | 14 | 5 |
| Barnsley (loan) | 2011–12 | Championship | 6 | 0 | — | | — | | — | | 6 | 0 |
| Wolverhampton Wanderers | 2012–13 | Championship | 2 | 0 | 0 | 0 | 3 | 1 | — | | 5 | 1 |
| Ipswich Town | 2012–13 | Championship | 17 | 2 | 0 | 0 | — | | — | | 17 | 2 |
| Ipswich Town | 2013–14 | Championship | 38 | 2 | 2 | 1 | 1 | 0 | — | | 41 | 3 |
| Ipswich Town | 2014–15 | Championship | 1 | 0 | 0 | 0 | 1 | 0 | — | | 2 | 0 |
| Ipswich Town | Total | | 56 | 4 | 2 | 1 | 2 | 0 | — | | 60 | 5 |
| Coventry City (loan) | 2014–15 | League One | 12 | 3 | 1 | 0 | — | | 2 | 1 | 15 | 4 |
| Coventry City | 2014–15 | League One | 19 | 3 | 0 | 0 | — | | 0 | 0 | 19 | 3 |
| Tianjin Songjiang | 2015 | China League One | 15 | 3 | – | | – | | – | | 15 | 3 |
| Nei Mongol Zhongyou (loan) | 2016 | China League One | 0 | 0 | – | | – | | – | | 0 | 0 |
| Gillingham | 2016–17 | League One | 12 | 1 | 1 | 2 | 0 | 0 | 0 | 0 | 13 | 3 |
| Southend United | 2016–17 | League One | 5 | 0 | — | | — | | — | | 5 | 0 |
| Newport County | 2017–18 | League Two | 45 | 9 | 5 | 1 | 2 | 0 | 0 | 0 | 52 | 10 |
| Colchester United | 2018–19 | League Two | 43 | 9 | 1 | 0 | 1 | 0 | 1 (Note: Appearance in EFL Trophy) | 0 | 46 | 9 |
| Colchester United | 2019–20 | League Two | 36 | 5 | 1 | 0 | 5 | 0 | 4 (Note: Two appearances in EFL Trophy, two appearances in EFL League Two play-offs) | 0 | 46 | 5 |
| Colchester United | Total | | 79 | 14 | 2 | 0 | 6 | 0 | 5 | 0 | 92 | 14 |
| Plymouth Argyle | 2020–21 | League One | 24 | 1 | 4 | 0 | 2 | 1 | 1 | 0 | 31 | 2 |
| Colchester United (loan) | 2020–21 | League Two | 20 | 3 | — | | — | | — | | 20 | 3 |
| Colchester United | 2021–22 | League Two | 19 | 0 | 1 | 0 | 1 | 0 | 3 | 0 | 24 | 0 |
| Colchester United | 2022–23 | League Two | 20 | 2 | 1 | 0 | 2 | 0 | 4 | 1 | 27 | 3 |
| Colchester United | Total | | 39 | 2 | 2 | 0 | 3 | 0 | 7 | 1 | 51 | 3 |
| Leyton Orient (loan) | 2021–22 | League Two | 8 | 0 | — | | — | | — | | 8 | 0 |
| Torquay United | 2022–23 | National League | 9 | 3 | — | | — | | — | | 9 | 3 |
| Yeovil Town | 2023–24 | National League South | 44 | 11 | 5 | 2 | — | | 1 (Note: Appearance in FA Trophy) | 0 | 50 | 13 |
| Yeovil Town | 2024–25 | National League | 36 | 2 | 1 | 0 | — | | 1 | 0 | 38 | 2 |
| Yeovil Town | Total | | 80 | 13 | 6 | 2 | — | | 2 | 0 | 88 | 15 |
| Gateshead | 2024–25 | National League | 7 | 0 | — | | — | | — | | 7 | 0 |
| Gateshead | 2025–26 | National League | 23 | 3 | 2 | 0 | — | | 3 (Note: One appearance in FA Trophy, two appearances in National League Cup) | 0 | 28 | 3 |
| Gateshead | Total | | 30 | 3 | 2 | 0 | — | | 3 | 0 | 35 | 3 |
| Spennymoor Town | 2025–26 | National League North | 11 | 0 | — | | — | | — | | 11 | 0 |
| Career total | | | 528 | 70 | 29 | 6 | 20 | 2 | 21 | 2 | 598 | 80 |

== Honours ==
Yeovil Town

- National League South: 2023–24

Individual

- EFL League Two Player of the Month: August 2017
