= 2009–10 Coventry City F.C. season =

Coventry City F.C.
2009–10 season
- Chairman: Ray Ranson
- Manager: Chris Coleman
- Championship: 19th
- FA Cup: Third round (eliminated by Portsmouth)
- League Cup: First round (eliminated by Hartlepool United)
- Top goalscorer: League: All: Clinton Morrison, 11
- Highest home attendance: 22,209 vs Leicester City, Championship, 3 October 2009; Cup: 7,097 vs Portsmouth, FA Cup, 12 January 2010
- Lowest home attendance: 14,426 vs Sheffield United, Championship, 15 September 2009; Cup: 6,055 vs Hartlepool United, League Cup, 12 August 2009
Home colours	Away colours	Third colours

The 2009–10 season was the 90th season in the history of Coventry City Football Club, an association football club based in Coventry, West Midlands, England. It was the club's ninth consecutive season in the Football League Championship, the second tier of English football, following a 17th-place finish in the previous season. The club also took part in two cup competitions, the FA Cup and the Football League Cup.

Coventry finished 19th in the league, 7 points above the relegation places, and were knocked out in the third round of the FA Cup and the first round of the League Cup, in both cases the round in which they entered the competition.

== Review and events ==
=== Monthly events ===
This is a list of the significant events to occur at the club during the 2009–10 season, presented in chronological order. This list does not include transfers, which are listed in the transfers section below, or match results, which are in the results section.

June:

- 16 – Coventry City draw Hartlepool United at home in the League Cup First Round.
- 17 – Coventry City's fixtures for the 2009–10 Championship season are announced
- 18 – Midfielder Kevin Thornton is banned from driving for 22 months for multiple driving offences.
- 24 – 2009 FA Cup Finalists Everton have agreed to face Coventry City for Marcus Hall's testimonial.
- 26 – Defender Marcus Hall signs new one-year contract, keeping him at the club until 2010.
- 29 – Curtis Wynter, Adam Walker, Ashley Cain and Jermaine Grandison sign one-year contracts, their first professional contracts.

July:

- 14 – Stephen Wright is named new club captain for the 2009–10 season, taking over from Scott Dann.
- 21 – Coventry City announce the new squad numbers for the forthcoming season.
- 27 – Academy player Conor Thomas is called up to the England Under-17 squad for the first time – for the Nordic Cup.
- 29 – Academy player Conor Thomas wins his first England Under-17 cap against Denmark Under-17 in the Nordic Cup.
- 31 – Defender Jordan Clarke signs two-year contract, his first professional contract.

August

- 17 – Stephen Wright is named in the Official Football League Championship team of the week, following his performances against Barnsley and Doncaster Rovers.

September

- 2 – Jordan Clarke is called up to the England Under-19 squad for the first time in a friendly against Russia Under-19 .
- 8 – Jordan Clarke wins his first England Under-19 cap in a friendly against Russia Under-19.
- 28 – Leon Best is named in the Official Football League Championship team of the week, following his performance against Middlesbrough.

October

- 3 – Leon Best is named the September Football League Championship Player of the Month.
- 5 – Sammy Clingan is named in the Official Football League Championship team of the week, following his performance against Leicester City.

November

- 29 – Coventry City draw Portsmouth away in the FA Cup Third Round.
- 30 – Richard Wood is named in the Official Football League Championship team of the week, following his performance against Queens Park Rangers.

December

- 14 – Freddy Eastwood is named in the Official Football League Championship team of the week, following his performance against Peterborough United.

January

- 3 – If Coventry City get past Portsmouth they have drawn Sunderland at home in the FA Cup Fourth Round.
- 21 – David Bell's goal against Doncaster Rovers is voted Sky Blues' 2009 Goal of the Year.

February

- 9 – Chris Coleman is fined £1,000 for improper conduct following his outburst after the Sky Blues defeat to Ipswich Town in January.
- 22 – Keiren Westwood is named in the Official Football League Championship team of the week, following his performance against Crystal Palace.

March

- 1 – Sammy Clingan is named in the Official Football League Championship team of the week, following his performance against Scunthorpe United.
- 8 – Jon Stead is named in the Official Football League Championship team of the week, following his performance against Peterborough United.
- 9 – Coventry City announce that at the end of the season the deal current sponsors Cassidy Group will end and they will seek a new sponsor.
- 15 – Michael McIndoe is named in the Official Football League Championship team of the week, following his performance against Plymouth Argyle.
- 16 – Callum Wilson is named the March League Football Education Apprentice of the Month.
- 16 – Callum Wilson, Nathan Cameron, Michael Quirke and Shaun Jeffers are offered their first professional contracts.
- 22 – Keiren Westwood wins South Wales Supporters' Club's Player of The Season Award for 2009/2010.
- 26- Coventry City announce they have signed a £1 million, three-year sponsorship deal with City Link, starting with the 2010/2011 season.

April

- 7 – Keiren Westwood wins Irish Supporters' Club Player of The Season Award for 2009/2010.
- 8 – Michael Quirke wins Under 18 Player of The Season Award for 2009/2010.
- 12 – Former Coventry City captain Charlie Timmins passes away following a long battle with cancer.
- 17 – Keiren Westwood wins London Supporters' Club Player of The Season Award for 2009/2010.
- 26 – Aron Gunnarsson is named in the Official Football League Championship team of the week, following his performance against Middlesbrough.

May

- 3 – Clinton Morrison wins Community Player of The Season Award for 2009/2010.
- 3 – Jordan Clarke wins Young Player of The Season Award for 2009/2010.
- 3 – David Bell wins Goal of The Season Award for 2009/2010 for his strike against Crystal Palace.
- 3 – Clinton Morrison wins Top Scorer Award for 2009/2010.
- 3 – Keiren Westwood wins Player' Player of The Season Award for 2009/2010.
- 3 – Keiren Westwood wins Player of The Season Award for 2009/2010.
- 4 – Chris Coleman is relieved of his duties as manager with immediate effect.
- 14 – Striker Shaun Jeffers signs his first professional contract, a one-year deal running until June 2011.
- 14 – Defender Jermaine Grandison signs new one-year contract, keeping him at the club until 2011.
- 17 – Striker Callum Wilson signs his first professional contract, a one-year deal running until June 2011.
- 20 – Aidy Boothroyd is appointed as new Coventry City manager, signing a three-year contract.
- 21 – Defender Nathan Cameron signs his first professional contract, a one-year deal running until June 2011.
- 24 – Coach and reserve team manager Frankie Bunn leaves The Sky Blues after his contract expires.

== Squad details ==
=== Players info ===
No.	Name	Nat.	Place of birth	Date of birth	Club apps.	Club goals	Int. caps	Int. goals	Previous club	Date joined	Fee
1	Keiren Westwood	(Republic of Ireland)	Manchester	23 October 1984	49	0	1	0	Carlisle United	18 June 2008	£500,000
2	Stephen Wright	(England)	Bootle	8 February 1980	21	0	–	–	Sunderland	8 August 2008	Free
3	Marcus Hall	(England)	Coventry	24 March 1976	300	2	–	–	Stoke City	21 February 2005	Free
4	Sammy Clingan	(Northern Ireland)	Belfast	13 January 1984	–	–	18	–	Norwich City	24 July 2009	£700,000
5	Elliott Ward	(England)	Harrow	19 January 1985	116	16	–	–	West Ham United	16 June 2006	£1,000,000
6	James McPake	(Scotland)	Bellshill	24 June 1984	5	0	–	–	Livingston	2 February 2009	Undisclosed
7	David Bell	(Republic of Ireland)	Kettering	21 January 1984	9	1	–	–	Norwich City	30 January 2009	£500,000
8	Michael Doyle	(Republic of Ireland)	Dublin	8 July 1981	278	25	1	0	Celtic	1 July 2003	Free
9	Leon Best	(Republic of Ireland)	Nottingham	19 September 1986	75	13	1	0	Southampton	6 July 2007	£650,000
9	Jon Stead	(England)	Huddersfield	7 April 1983	–	–	–	–	Ipswich Town	15 February 2010	Loan
10	Freddy Eastwood	(Wales)	Basildon	29 October 1983	52	4	9	4	Wolverhampton Wanderers	11 July 2008	£1,200,000
11	Clinton Morrison	(Republic of Ireland)	Tooting	14 May 1979	52	12	36	9	Crystal Palace	7 August 2008	Free
12	Patrick van Aanholt	(Netherlands)	Den Bosch	29 August 1990	–	–	–	–	Chelsea	7 August 2009	Loan
12	Gary Deegan	(Republic of Ireland)	Dublin	28 September 1987	–	–	–	–	Bohemians	4 January 2010	€90,000
13	Dimitrios Konstantopoulos	(Greece)	Thessaloniki	29 November 1978	23	0	–	–	Hartlepool United	30 June 2007	Free
14	Leon McKenzie	(England)	Croydon	17 May 1978	67	14	–	–	Norwich City	31 August 2006	£1,000,000
14	Chris Hussey	(England)	Hammersmith	2 January 1989	–	–	–	–	AFC Wimbledon	1 January 2010	Undisclosed
15	Martin Cranie	(England)	Yeovil	23 September 1986	–	–	–	–	Portsmouth	13 August 2009	£500,000
16	Isaac Osbourne	(England)	Coventry	22 June 1986	119	0	–	–	N/A	1 January 2003	Trainee
17	Aron Gunnarsson	(Iceland)	Akureyri	22 April 1989	47	2	11	0	AZ Alkmaar	17 June 2008	Undisclosed
18	Jack Cork	(England)	Carshalton	25 June 1989	–	–	–	–	Chelsea	21 August 2009	Loan
18	Carl Baker	(England)	Whiston	26 December 1982	–	–	–	–	Stockport County	8 January 2010	Undisclosed
19	Gary Madine	(England)	Gateshead	24 August 1990	–	–	–	–	Carlisle United	19 October 2009	Loan
19	Freddie Sears	(England)	Hornchurch	27 November 1989	–	–	–	–	West Ham United	12 February 2010	Loan
20	Ben Turner	(England)	Birmingham	21 January 1988	56	0	–	–	N/A	1 July 2005	Trainee
21	Michael McIndoe	(Scotland)	Edinburgh	2 December 1979	–	–	–	–	Bristol City	4 August 2009	£350,000
22	Leon Barnett	(England)	Luton	30 November 1985	–	–	–	–	West Bromwich Albion	4 October 2009	Loan
23	Danny Ireland	(Australia)	Australia	30 September 1990	1	0	–	–	N/A	1 July 2007	Trainee
24	Richard Wood	(England)	Ossett	5 July 1985	–	–	–	–	Sheffield Wednesday	1 January 2010	Undisclosed
30	Adam Walker	(England)	Meriden	22 January 1991	2	0	–	–	N/A	1 June 2008	Trainee
31	Curtis Wynter	(England)	Birmingham	24 June 1991	2	0	–	–	N/A	1 June 2008	Trainee
32	Ashley Cain	(England)	Nuneaton	27 September 1990	5	0	–	–	N/A	1 June 2008	Trainee
33	Michael Quirke	(England)	Coventry	10 September 1991	–	–	–	–	N/A	1 June 2009	Trainee
34	Jermaine Grandison	(England)	Birmingham	15 December 1990	2	0	–	–	N/A	1 June 2008	Trainee
35	Jordan Clarke	(England)	Coventry	19 November 1991	–	–	–	–	N/A	1 June 2008	Trainee
36	Shaun Jeffers	(England)	Bedford	14 April 1992	–	–	–	–	N/A	1 June 2009	Trainee
37	Jacob Blackwell	(England)	Coventry	15 April 1991	–	–	–	–	N/A	1 June 2009	Trainee
38	Nathan Cameron	(England)	Birmingham	21 November 1991	–	–	–	–	N/A	1 June 2009	Trainee
39	Conor Grogan	(England)	London	4 September 1992	–	–	–	–	N/A	1 June 2009	Trainee
40	Callum Wilson	(England)	Coventry	27 February 1992	–	–	–	–	N/A	1 June 2009	Trainee

== Matches ==
=== Pre-season friendlies ===
11 July 2009
15:00

Wrexham	1–1	Coventry City
Williams 25'	(report)	Grandison 65'

Racecourse Ground, Wrexham
Attendance: 1,359
Referee: Carmelo Lo Faro
15 July 2009
19:00

Nuneaton Town	0–1	Coventry City
	(report)	Morrison 33'

Liberty Way, Nuneaton
Attendance: 1,754
Referee: David Coote
18 July 2009
15:00

Hinckley United	0–2	Coventry City
	(report)	Best 25'; Eastwood 85'

The Greene King Stadium, Hinckley
Attendance: 866
Referee: Mick Murphy
21 July 2009
19:45

Northampton Town	1–2	Coventry City
McKay 84'	(report)	Best 52'; Jeffers 87'

Sixfields Stadium, Northampton
Attendance: 1,975
Referee: Dean Whitestone
25 July 2009
15:00

Huddersfield Town	0–0	Coventry City
	(report)

Galpharm Stadium, Huddersfield
Attendance: 3,886
Referee: Mark Heywood
29 July 2009
19:45

Dunfermline Athletic	1–0	Coventry City
Kirk 39'	(report)

East End Park, Dunfermline
Attendance: 1,162
Referee: John McKendrick
2 August 2009
12:30

Coventry City	2–2	Everton
Doyle 34'; Gunnarsson 88'	(report)	Cahill 15'; Baxter 84'

Ricoh Arena, Coventry
Attendance: 8,000
Referee: Pete Walton

=== Championship ===
9 August 2009
12:45

Coventry City	2–1	Ipswich Town
Morrison 10', 24'	(report)	Walters 28'

Ricoh Arena, Coventry
Attendance: 16,279
Referee: Russell Booth
15 August 2009
15:00

Barnsley	0–2	Coventry City
Kozluk (red card) 58'	(report)	Best 8'; Morrison 81'

Oakwell Stadium, Barnsley
Attendance: 12,552
Referee: Steve Tanner
18 August 2009
19:45

Doncaster Rovers	0–0	Coventry City
	(report)

Keepmoat Stadium, Doncaster
Attendance: 9,484
Referee: Carl Boyeson
22 August 2009
15:00

Coventry City	0–1	Swansea City
	(report)	Williams 69'

Ricoh Arena, Coventry
Attendance: 16,307
Referee: Phil Crossley
29 August 2009
15:00

Blackpool	3–0	Coventry City
Adam pen 13'; Burgess 59'; Taylor-Fletcher 71'	(report)

Bloomfield Road, Blackpool
Attendance: 8,239
Referee: Nigel Miller
12 September 2009
15:00

Coventry City	1–1	Bristol City
Best 18'	(report)	Maynard 48'

Ricoh Arena, Coventry
Attendance: 16,449
Referee: Neil Swarbrick
15 September 2009
19:45

Coventry City	3–2	Sheffield United
Best 12'; Morrison 50'; Cranie 60'	(report)	Ward 31'; Harper 76'

Ricoh Arena, Coventry
Attendance: 14,426
Referee: Anthony Taylor
19 September 2009
15:00

Preston North End	3–2	Coventry City
Brown 50', 68'; Mellor 55'	(report)	Clingan 19'; Morrison 90'

Deepdale, Preston
Attendance: 11,230
Referee: Darren Deadman
26 September 2009
15:00

Coventry City	2–2	Middlesbrough
Morrison 78'; Best 90'	(report)	St Ledger 40'; Williams 45'

Ricoh Arena, Coventry
Attendance: 16,771
Referee: Graham Horwood
29 September 2009
19:45

Watford	2–3	Coventry City
Cleverley 21'; Hoskins 37'	(report)	Clingan 14'; Best 67', 84'

Vicarage Road, Watford
Attendance: 13,034
Referee: Andre Marriner
3 October 2009
15:00

Coventry City	1–1	Leicester City
Clingan 38'	(report)	Waghorn 40'

Ricoh Arena, Coventry
Attendance: 22,209
Referee: Michael Oliver
17 October 2009
15:00

Sheffield Wednesday	2–0	Coventry City
Purse 4'; Clarke pen 20'	(report)

Hillsborough, Sheffield
Attendance: 20,026
Referee: Colin Webster
20 October 2009
19:45

Cardiff City	2–0	Coventry City
Gerrard 5'; Whittingham pen 60'	(report)

Cardiff City Stadium, Cardiff
Attendance: 19,038
Referee: Mike Russell
24 October 2009
15:00

Coventry City	0–0	West Bromwich Albion
	(report)

Ricoh Arena, Coventry
Attendance: 20,871
Referee: Keith Stroud
31 October 2009
15:00

Coventry City	1–3	Reading
Eastwood 63'	(report)	Rasiak 1', 72'; McAnuff 53'

Ricoh Arena, Coventry
Attendance: 15,165
Referee: Eddie Ilderton
6 November 2009
19:45

Derby County	2–1	Coventry City
Hulse 49', 62'	(report)	Best 4'; Clarke (red card) 63'

Pride Park Stadium, Derby
Attendance: 26,511
Referee: Phil Crossley
21 November 2009
15:00

Coventry City	1–1	Crystal Palace
Best 47'	(report)	Ambrose 28'

Ricoh Arena, Coventry
Attendance: 18,499
Referee: Jarnail Singh
28 November 2009
15:00

Queens Park Rangers	2–2	Coventry City
Simpson 35'; Buzsaky 69'	(report)	Best 16'; Wood 80'; Wright (red card) 85'

Loftus Road, London
Attendance: 13,712
Referee: Michael Jones
6 December 2009
13:15

Scunthorpe United	1–0	Coventry City
Hooper 30'	(report)

Glanford Park, Scunthorpe
Attendance: 5,013
Referee: Nigel Miller
9 December 2009
19:45

Coventry City	0–2	Newcastle United
	(report)	Ameobi 45'; Ranger 82'

Ricoh Arena, Coventry
Attendance: 21,688
Referee: Grant Hegley
12 December 2009
15:00

Coventry City	3–2	Peterborough United
Eastwood 32', 34', 71'	(report)	Mackail-Smith 66', 69'

Ricoh Arena, Coventry
Attendance: 15,190
Referee: Roger East
19 December 2009
15:00

Plymouth Argyle	0–1	Coventry City
	(report)	Eastwood 72'

Home Park, Plymouth
Attendance: 8,347
Referee: Keith Stroud
26 December 2009
15:00

Coventry City	1–0	Doncaster Rovers
Morrison pen 83'	(report)

Ricoh Arena, Coventry
Attendance: 19,221
Referee: Rob Shoebridge
28 December 2009
15:00

Nottingham Forest	2–0	Coventry City
Earnshaw 42'; Blackstock 77'	(report)

City Ground, Nottingham
Attendance: 28,608
Referee: Mark Clattenburg
9 January 2010
15:00

Coventry City	3–1	Barnsley
Eastwood 24'; Clingan 27'; Morrison 90'	(report)	Macken 24'

Ricoh Arena, Coventry
Attendance: 15,031
Referee: Lee Mason
16 January 2010
15:00

Ipswich Town	3–2	Coventry City
John 42'; Colback 52'; Couñago 90'	(report)	Morrison 2'; Wood 90'

Portman Road, Ipswich
Attendance: 20,135
Referee: Michael Oliver
26 January 2010
19:45

Swansea City	0–0	Coventry City
	(report)

Liberty Stadium, Swansea
Attendance: 13,868
Referee: Danny McDermid
30 January 2010
15:00

Coventry City	1–1	Blackpool
Baptiste og 83'	(report)	Bannan 69'; Ormerod (red card) 52'

Ricoh Arena, Coventry
Attendance: 16,019
Referee: Dean Whitestone
6 February 2010
15:00

Bristol City	1–1	Coventry City
Clarkson 83'	(report)	Bell 47'

Ashton Gate, Bristol
Attendance: 13,852
Referee: Graham Horwood
9 February 2010
19:45

Coventry City	1–0	Nottingham Forest
Eastwood 25'	(report)

Ricoh Arena, Coventry
Attendance: 18,225
Referee: Tony Bates
13 February 2010
15:00

Coventry City	1–0	Queens Park Rangers
Deegan 11'	(report)

Ricoh Arena, Coventry
Attendance: 15,247
Referee: David Foster
17 February 2010
19:45

Newcastle United	4–1	Coventry City
Routledge 37'; Carroll 53'; Løvenkrands pen 70'; R Taylor 90'	(report)	Morrison 35'; Barnett (red card) 69'

St James' Park, Newcastle
Attendance: 39,334
Referee: Steve Tanner
21 February 2010
15:00

Crystal Palace	0–1	Coventry City
	(report)	Bell 85'

Selhurst Park, London
Attendance: 13,333
Referee: Darren Deadman
27 February 2010
15:00

Coventry City	2–1	Scunthorpe United
Stead 55'; Clingan 68'; Barnett (red card) 59'	(report)	McCann 82'

Ricoh Arena, Coventry
Attendance: 16,197
Referee: Paul Taylor
6 March 2010
15:00

Peterborough United	0–1	Coventry City
	(report)	Stead 24'

London Road, Peterborough
Attendance: 10,469
Referee: Russell Booth
13 March 2010
15:00

Coventry City	1–1	Plymouth Argyle
McIndoe 49'	(report)	Árnason 45'

Ricoh Arena, Coventry
Attendance: 18,127
Referee: Andy Haines
16 March 2010
19:45

Coventry City	1–2	Cardiff City
Morrison 32'	(report)	Burke 41'; Whittingham pen 90'

Ricoh Arena, Coventry
Attendance: 16,038
Referee: Simon Hooper
21 March 2010
14:00

Leicester City	2–2	Coventry City
King 4', 20'	(report)	McPake 54'; Deegan 87'

Walkers Stadium, Leicester
Attendance: 23,093
Referee: Lee Mason
24 March 2010
19:45

West Bromwich Albion	1–0	Coventry City
Reid 22'	(report)

The Hawthorns, West Bromwich
Attendance: 22,140
Referee: Colin Webster
27 March 2010
15:00

Coventry City	1–1	Sheffield Wednesday
Wood 78'	(report)	Varney 68'

Ricoh Arena, Coventry
Attendance: 17,608
Referee: Neil Swarbrick
3 April 2010
15:00

Coventry City	0–1	Derby County
	(report)	Barker 20'

Ricoh Arena, Coventry
Attendance: 17,630
Referee: Andy D'Urso
5 April 2010
15:00

Reading	3–0	Coventry City
Rasiak 15'; Church pen 23'; Kébé 40'	(report)

Madejski Stadium, Reading
Attendance: 17,435
Referee: Andy Woolmer
10 April 2010
15:00

Sheffield United	1–0	Coventry City
Cresswell 47'	(report)

Bramall Lane, Sheffield
Attendance: 23,603
Referee: Graham Salisbury
17 April 2010
15:00

Coventry City	1–1	Preston North End
Eastwood 17'	(report)	Davidson pen 37'

Ricoh Arena, Coventry
Attendance: 15,822
Referee: Gavin Ward
24 April 2010
15:00

Middlesbrough	1–1	Coventry City
McDonald 52'	(report)	Gunnarsson 58'

Riverside Stadium, Middlesbrough
Attendance: 27,721
Referee: Danny McDermid
2 May 2010
13:00

Coventry City	0–4	Watford
	(report)	Graham (pen 16), 78'; Lansbury 17'; Sordell 81'

Ricoh Arena, Coventry
Attendance: 19,103
Referee: Mark Halsey

=== League Cup ===
First Round

12 August 2009
19.45

Coventry City	0–1	Hartlepool United
	(AET) (report)	Boyd 105'

Ricoh Arena, Coventry
Attendance: 6,055
Referee: Mark Haywood

=== FA Cup ===
Third Round

2 January 2010
15.00

Portsmouth	1–1	Coventry City
Boateng 45'	(report)	Bell 30'

Fratton Park, Portsmouth
Attendance: 11,214
Referee: Phil Dowd

Third Round Replay

12 January 2010
19.45

Coventry City	1–2	Portsmouth
Best 21'	(AET) (report)	Wright og 90'; Mokoena 120'

Ricoh Arena, Coventry
Attendance: 7,097
Referee: Mike Jones

== Championship data ==
=== League table ===
Pos	Team	Pld	W	D	L	GF	GA	GD	Pts
17	Preston North End	46	13	15	18	58	73	−15	54
18	Barnsley	46	14	12	20	53	69	−16	54
19	Coventry City	46	13	15	18	47	64	−17	54
20	Scunthorpe United	46	14	10	22	62	84	−22	52
21	Crystal Palace	46	14	17	15	50	53	−3	49 (Note: Crystal Palace were given a ten-point deduction for entering administration.)

Source: The Football League
Rules for classification: 1) points; 2) goal difference; 3) number of goals scored.

=== Results summary ===
Overall								Home						Away					
Pld	W	D	L	GF	GA	GD	Pts	W	D	L	GF	GA	GD	W	D	L	GF	GA	GD
46	13	15	18	47	64	−17	54	8	9	6	27	29	−2	5	6	12	20	35	−15

Last updated: 2 May 2010.
Source: CCFC Championship Results

=== Round by round ===
Round	1	2	3	4	5	6	7	8	9	10	11	12	13	14	15	16	17	18	19	20	21	22	23	24	25	26	27	28	29	30	31	32	33	34	35	36	37	38	39	40	41	42	43	44	45	46
Ground	H	A	A	H	A	H	H	A	H	A	H	A	A	H	H	A	H	A	A	H	H	A	H	A	H	A	A	H	A	H	H	A	A	H	A	H	H	A	A	H	H	A	A	H	A	H
Result	W	W	D	L	L	D	W	L	D	W	D	L	L	D	L	L	D	D	L	L	W	W	W	L	W	L	D	D	D	W	W	L	W	W	W	D	L	D	L	D	L	L	L	D	D	L
Position	2	1	3	9	12	11	9	11	13	10	11	15	17	15	16	16	18	17	20	20	19	17	16	17	14	15	17	14	16	14	10	11	10	10	8	8	10	10	12	12	13	14	17	16	16	19

Updated to match(es) played on 2 May 2010. Source: Championship Results
A = Away; H = Home; W = Win; D = Draw; L = Loss

=== Aggregate Scores ===
Opposition	Home Score	Away Score	Aggregate Result
Barnsley	3–1	2–0	Coventry City Do Double
Blackpool	1–1	0–3	
Bristol City	1–1	1–1	
Cardiff City	1–2	0–2	Cardiff City Do Double
Crystal Palace	1–1	1–0	
Derby County	0–2	1–2	Derby County Do Double
Doncaster Rovers	1–0	0–0	
Ipswich Town	2–1	2–3	
Leicester City	1–1	2–2	
Middlesbrough	2–2	1–1	
Newcastle United	0–2	1–4	Newcastle United Do Double
Nottingham Forest	1–0	0–2	
Peterborough United	3–2	1–0	Coventry City Do Double
Plymouth Argyle	1–1	1–0	
Preston North End	1–1	2–3	
Queens Park Rangers	1–0	2–2	
Reading	1–3	0–3	Reading Do Double
Scunthorpe United	2–1	0–1	
Sheffield United	3–2	0–1	
Sheffield Wednesday	1–1	0–2	
Swansea City	0–1	0–0	
Watford	0–4	3–2	
West Bromwich Albion	0–0	0–1	

== Season statistics ==
=== Starts & Goals ===
No.	Pos	Nat	Player	Total		Championship		League Cup		FA Cup	
No.	Pos	Nat	Player	Apps	Goals	Apps	Goals	Apps	Goals	Apps	Goals
1	GK	(Republic of Ireland) IRL	Keiren Westwood	46	0	44	0	0	0	2	0
2	DF	(England) ENG	Stephen Wright	40	0	37	0	1	0	2	0
3	DF	(England) ENG	Marcus Hall	7	0	7	0	0	0	0	0
4	MF	(Northern Ireland) NIR	Sammy Clingan	34	5	32	5	0	0	2	0
5	DF	(England) ENG	Elliott Ward (on loan to Doncaster Rovers & Preston North End)	4	0	4	0	0	0	0	0
6	DF	(Scotland) SCO	James McPake	19	1	17	1	0	0	2	0
7	MF	(Republic of Ireland) IRL	David Bell	22	3	20	2	0	0	2	1
8	MF	(Republic of Ireland) IRL	Michael Doyle (on loan to Leeds United)	0	0	0	0	0	0	0	0
9	FW	(Republic of Ireland) IRL	Leon Best	26	10	25	9	0	0	1	1
9	FW	(England) ENG	Jon Stead (on loan from Ipswich Town)	9	2	9	2	0	0	0	0
10	FW	(Wales) WAL	Freddy Eastwood	23	8	21	8	1	0	1	0
11	FW	(Republic of Ireland) IRL	Clinton Morrison	40	11	38	11	0	0	2	0
12	DF	(Netherlands) NED	Patrick van Aanholt (on loan from Chelsea)	19	0	19	0	0	0	0	0
12	MF	(Republic of Ireland) IRL	Gary Deegan	9	2	9	2	0	0	0	0
13	GK	(Greece) GRE	Dimitrios Konstantopoulos	3	0	2	0	1	0	0	0
14	FW	(England) ENG	Leon McKenzie	0	0	0	0	0	0	0	0
14	DF	(England) ENG	Chris Hussey (on loan from AFC Wimbledon)	1	0	1	0	0	0	0	0
15	DF	(England) ENG	Martin Cranie	41	1	39	1	0	0	2	0
16	MF	(England) ENG	Isaac Osbourne	13	0	12	0	1	0	0	0
17	MF	(Iceland) ISL	Aron Gunnarsson	36	1	34	1	0	0	2	0
18	MF	(England) ENG	Jack Cork (on loan from Chelsea)	20	0	20	0	0	0	0	0
18	MF	(England) ENG	Carl Baker	14	0	14	0	0	0	0	0
19	FW	(England) ENG	Gary Madine (on loan from Carlisle United)	0	0	0	0	0	0	0	0
19	FW	(England) ENG	Freddie Sears (on loan from West Ham United)	3	0	3	0	0	0	0	0
20	DF	(England) ENG	Ben Turner	14	0	13	0	1	0	0	0
21	MF	(Scotland) SCO	Michael McIndoe	41	1	38	1	1	0	2	0
22	DF	(England) ENG	Leon Barnett (on loan from West Bromwich Albion)	19	0	19	0	0	0	0	0
23	GK	(Australia) AUS	Danny Ireland (on loan to Forest Green Rovers)	0	0	0	0	0	0	0	0
24	DF	(England) ENG	Richard Wood (on loan from Sheffield Wednesday)	24	3	22	3	0	0	2	0
30	MF	(England) ENG	Adam Walker (on loan to Nuneaton Town)	1	0	0	0	1	0	0	0
31	DF	(England) ENG	Curtis Wynter	0	0	0	0	0	0	0	0
32	MF	(England) ENG	Ashley Cain (on loan to Luton Town & Oxford United)	1	0	0	0	1	0	0	0
33	GK	(England) ENG	Michael Quirke	0	0	0	0	0	0	0	0
34	MF	(England) ENG	Jermaine Grandison	2	0	1	0	1	0	0	0
35	MF	(England) ENG	Jordan Clarke	7	0	6	0	1	0	0	0
36	FW	(England) ENG	Shaun Jeffers	1	0	0	0	1	0	0	0
37	MF	(England) ENG	Jacob Blackwell	0	0	0	0	0	0	0	0
38	DF	(England) ENG	Nathan Cameron (on loan to Nuneaton Town)	0	0	0	0	0	0	0	0
39	MF	(England) ENG	Conor Grogan	0	0	0	0	0	0	0	0
40	FW	(England) ENG	Callum Wilson	0	0	0	0	0	0	0	0

Note: Player substitutions are not included.

=== Goalscorers ===
No.	Flag	Pos	Name	Championship	League Cup	FA Cup	Total
11	(Republic of Ireland)	FW	Clinton Morrison	11	0	0	11
9	(Republic of Ireland)	FW	Leon Best	9	0	1	10
10	(Wales)	FW	Freddy Eastwood	8	0	0	8
4	(Northern Ireland)	MF	Sammy Clingan	5	0	0	5
7	(Republic of Ireland)	MF	David Bell	2	0	1	3
24	(England)	DF	Richard Wood	3	0	0	3
9	(England)	FW	Jon Stead	2	0	0	2
12	(Republic of Ireland)	MF	Gary Deegan	2	0	0	2
6	(Scotland)	DF	James McPake	1	0	0	1
15	(England)	DF	Martin Cranie	1	0	0	1
17	(Iceland)	MF	Aron Gunnarsson	1	0	0	1
21	(Scotland)	MF	Michael McIndoe	1	0	0	1
			Own goal	1	0	0	1

=== Assists ===
No.	Flag	Pos	Name	Championship	League Cup	FA Cup	Total
21	(Scotland)	MF	Michael McIndoe	6	0	0	6
9	(Republic of Ireland)	FW	Leon Best	4	0	0	4
4	(Northern Ireland)	MF	Sammy Clingan	3	0	0	3
15	(England)	DF	Martin Cranie	3	0	0	3
18	(England)	MF	Carl Baker	3	0	0	3
5	(England)	DF	Elliott Ward	2	0	0	2
10	(Wales)	FW	Freddy Eastwood	2	0	0	2
16	(England)	MF	Isaac Osbourne	2	0	0	2
1	(Republic of Ireland)	GK	Keiren Westwood	0	0	1	1
2	(England)	DF	Stephen Wright	1	0	0	1
3	(England)	DF	Marcus Hall	1	0	0	1
6	(Scotland)	DF	James McPake	1	0	0	1
7	(Republic of Ireland)	MF	David Bell	1	0	0	1
9	(England)	FW	Jon Stead	1	0	0	1
11	(Republic of Ireland)	FW	Clinton Morrison	1	0	0	1
12	(Netherlands)	DF	Patrick van Aanholt	1	0	0	1
22	(England)	DF	Leon Barnett	1	0	0	1
24	(England)	DF	Richard Wood	1	0	0	1

=== Yellow cards ===
No.	Flag	Pos	Name	Championship	League Cup	FA Cup	Total
2	(England)	DF	Stephen Wright	8	1	0	(yellow card) 9
11	(Republic of Ireland)	FW	Clinton Morrison	6	0	0	(yellow card) 6
12	(Netherlands)	DF	Patrick van Aanholt	5	0	0	(yellow card) 5
17	(Iceland)	MF	Aron Gunnarsson	4	0	1	(yellow card) 5
22	(England)	DF	Leon Barnett	5	0	0	(yellow card) 5
24	(England)	DF	Richard Wood	4	0	1	(yellow card) 5
18	(England)	MF	Jack Cork	4	0	0	(yellow card) 4
9	(Republic of Ireland)	FW	Leon Best	4	0	0	(yellow card) 4
4	(Northern Ireland)	MF	Sammy Clingan	4	0	0	(yellow card) 4
21	(Scotland)	MF	Michael McIndoe	3	0	0	(yellow card) 3
6	(Scotland)	DF	James McPake	3	0	0	(yellow card) 3
15	(England)	DF	Martin Cranie	2	0	1	(yellow card) 3
10	(Wales)	FW	Freddy Eastwood	3	0	0	(yellow card) 3
14	(England)	DF	Chris Hussey	2	0	0	(yellow card) 2
1	(Republic of Ireland)	GK	Keiren Westwood	2	0	0	(yellow card) 2
3	(England)	DF	Marcus Hall	2	0	0	(yellow card) 2
12	(Republic of Ireland)	MF	Gary Deegan	2	0	0	(yellow card) 2
5	(England)	DF	Elliott Ward	1	0	0	(yellow card) 1
20	(England)	DF	Ben Turner	1	0	0	(yellow card) 1
16	(England)	MF	Isaac Osbourne	1	0	0	(yellow card) 1
35	(England)	DF	Jordan Clarke	1	0	0	(yellow card) 1
7	(Republic of Ireland)	MF	David Bell	0	0	1	(yellow card) 1
18	(England)	MF	Carl Baker	1	0	0	(yellow card) 1
36	(England)	FW	Sean Jeffers	1	0	0	(yellow card) 1

=== Red cards ===
No.	Flag	Pos	Name	Championship	League Cup	FA Cup	Total
22	(England)	DF	Leon Barnett	2	0	0	(red card) 2
35	(England)	DF	Jordan Clarke	1	0	0	(red card) 1
2	(England)	DF	Stephen Wright	1	0	0	(red card) 1

=== Captains ===
No.	Pos.	Name	Starts
2	DF	(England) Stephen Wright	40
11	FW	(Republic of Ireland) Clinton Morrison	4
24	DF	(England) Richard Wood	3
6	DF	(Scotland) James McPake	2

=== Penalties Awarded ===
Date	Success?	Penalty Taker	Opponent	Competition
2009-08-22	✗	(Northern Ireland) Sammy Clingan	Swansea City	Championship
2009-12-26	✗	(Republic of Ireland) Leon Best	Doncaster Rovers	Championship
2009-12-26	✓	(Republic of Ireland) Clinton Morrison	Doncaster Rovers	Championship

=== Suspensions served ===
Date	Matches missed	Suspended player	Reason	Missed ppponents
2009-11-20	1	(England) Jordan Clarke	Sent off vs. Derby County	Crystal Palace (H)
2009-12-06	1	(Netherlands) Patrick van Aanholt	Reached 5 yellow cards	Scunthorpe United (A)
2009-12-06	2	(England) Stephen Wright	Sent off vs. Queens Park Rangers	Scunthorpe United (A), Newcastle United (H)
2009-12-19	1	(England) Stephen Wright	Reached 5 yellow cards	Plymouth Argyle (A)
2010-02-20	1	(England) Leon Barnett	Sent off vs. Newcastle United	Crystal Palace (A)
2010-03-06	2	(England) Leon Barnett	Sent off vs. Scunthorpe United	Peterborough United (A), Plymouth Argyle (H)

=== Monthly & Weekly Awards ===
Championship Team of the Week	17 August 2009	Stephen Wright
Championship Team of the Week	28 September 2009	Leon Best
Championship Player of the Month	3 October 2009	Leon Best
Championship Team of the Week	5 October 2009	Sammy Clingan
Championship Team of the Week	30 November 2009	Richard Wood
Championship Team of the Week	14 December 2009	Freddy Eastwood
Championship Team of the Week	22 February 2010	Keiren Westwood
Championship Team of the Week	1 March 2010	Sammy Clingan
Championship Team of the Week	8 March 2010	Jon Stead
Championship Team of the Week	15 March 2010	Michael McIndoe
Championship Team of the Week	26 April 2010	Aron Gunnarsson

=== End of Season Awards ===
Player of The Season Award	Keiren Westwood
Young Player of The Season Award	Jordan Clarke
Players' Player of The Season Award	Keiren Westwood
Top Scorer Award	Clinton Morrison
Goal of The Season Award	David Bell
Community Player of The Season Award	Clinton Morrison

=== Overall ===
Games played	49 (46 Championship, 1 League Cup, 1 FA Cup)
Games won	13 (13 Championship, 0 League Cup, 0 FA Cup)
Games drawn	16 (15 Championship, 0 League Cup, 1 FA Cup)
Games lost	18 (17 Championship, 1 League Cup, 1 FA Cup)
Goals scored	49 (47 Championship, 0 League Cup, 2 FA Cup)
Goals conceded	68 (64 Championship, 1 League Cup, 3 FA Cup)
Goal difference	−19
Yellow cards	73 (68 Championship, 1 League Cup, 4 FA Cup)
Red cards	4 (4 Championship, 0 League Cup, 0 FA Cup)
Worst discipline	(England) Stephen Wright (9 (yellow card) , 1 (red card) )
Best result	2–0 (A) v Barnsley – Championship – 2009.08.15
	3–1 (H) v Barnsley – Championship – 2010.01.09
Worst result	0–4 (H) v Watford – Championship – 2010.05.02
Most appearances	(Republic of Ireland) Keiren Westwood (46 appearances)
Top scorer	(Republic of Ireland) Clinton Morrison (11 goals)
Points	54 / 138 (39.13%)

== Transfers ==
=== Transfers in ===
Player	From	Date	Fee
(Northern Ireland) Sammy Clingan	Norwich City	24 July 2009	£700,000
(Scotland) Michael McIndoe	Bristol City	4 August 2009	£300,000
(England) Martin Cranie	Portsmouth	13 August 2009	£500,000
(England) Chris Hussey	AFC Wimbledon	1 January 2010	Undisclosed
(England) Richard Wood	Sheffield Wednesday	1 January 2010	Undisclosed
(Republic of Ireland) Gary Deegan	Bohemians	4 January 2010	€90,000
(England) Carl Baker	Stockport County	8 January 2010	Undisclosed

=== Transfers out ===
Player	To	Date	Fee
(England) Donovan Simmonds	Floriana	1 June 2009	Free
(England) Scott Dann	Birmingham City	12 June 2009	£3,500,000
(England) Robbie Simpson	Huddersfield Town	18 June 2009	£300,000
(England) Sean Fraser	Falkirk	28 June 2009	Free
(England) Bradley Jones	Glenn Hoddle Academy	28 June 2009	Free
(England) Chris Hollist	Nuneaton Town	28 June 2009	Free
(England) Andy Marshall	Aston Villa	30 June 2009	Free
(Malta) Michael Mifsud	Valletta	30 June 2009	Free
(France) Guillaume Beuzelin	Hamilton Academical	30 June 2009	Free
(Republic of Ireland) Kevin Thornton	Boyne Rovers	2 July 2009	Free
(England) Daniel Fox	Celtic	24 July 2009	Undisclosed
(England) Leon McKenzie	Charlton Athletic	1 September 2009	Free
(England) Tyrone Belford	Liverpool	21 October 2009	Tribunal
(Republic of Ireland) Leon Best	Newcastle United	1 February 2010	Undisclosed
(England) Adam Walker	Nuneaton Town	1 April 2010	Free
(England) Robert Ogleby	Hearts	9 April 2010	Free

=== Loans in ===
Player	From	Date from	Date until
(Netherlands) Patrick van Aanholt	Chelsea	7 August 2009	31 December 2009
(England) Jack Cork	Chelsea	21 August 2009	31 December 2009
(England) Chris Hussey	AFC Wimbledon	19 October 2009	31 December 2009
(England) Gary Madine	Carlisle United	19 October 2009	21 January 2010
(England) Leon Barnett	West Bromwich Albion	4 October 2009	3 May 2010
(England) Richard Wood	Sheffield Wednesday	18 November 2009	31 December 2009
(England) Freddie Sears	West Ham United	11 February 2010	30 May 2010
(England) Jon Stead	Ipswich Town	15 February 2010	8 April 2010

=== Loans out ===
Player	To	Date from	Date until
(Republic of Ireland) Michael Doyle	Leeds United	6 August 2009	30 June 2010
(England) Adam Walker	Nuneaton Town	28 October 2009	27 December 2009
(England) Ashley Cain	Luton Town	26 November 2009	28 December 2009
(Australia) Danny Ireland	Forest Green Rovers	12 February 2010	12 March 2010
(England) Elliott Ward	Doncaster Rovers	15 February 2010	15 March 2010
(England) Ashley Cain	Oxford United	19 February 2010	21 March 2010
(England) Elliott Ward	Preston North End	23 March 2010	2 May 2010
(England) Nathan Cameron	Nuneaton Town	1 April 2010	5 May 2010
(England) Jamie Greenway	Nuneaton Town	1 April 2010	5 May 2010

== Kit profile ==
Supplier: Puma
Sponsor(s): Home – Cassidy Group
Sponsor: Away – StadiArena

Home Strip	Away Strip
