= 2008–09 Coventry City F.C. season =

Coventry City F.C.
2008–2009 season
- Chairman: Ray Ranson
- Manager: Chris Coleman
- Championship: 17th
- FA Cup: Quarter-final (eliminated by Chelsea)
- League Cup: Second round (eliminated by Newcastle United)
- Top goalscorer: League: Clinton Morrison, 10; All: Clinton Morrison, 12
- Highest home attendance: League: 22,637 vs Birmingham City, 22 February 2009; Overall: 31,407 vs Chelsea, FA Cup, 8 March 2009
- Lowest home attendance: League: 14,621 vs Burnley, 21 October 2008; Overall: 9,293 vs Aldershot Town, League Cup, 13 August 2008
- Average home league attendance: 17,408
Home colours	Away colours	Third colours

The 2008–09 season was Coventry City's 89th season in The Football League and their 8th consecutive season in the Football League Championship. Along with competing in the Championship, the club also participated in the FA Cup and Football League Cup. The season covers the period from 1 July 2008 to 30 June 2009.

== Review and events ==
=== Monthly events ===
This is a list of the significant events to occur at the club during the 2008-09 season, presented in chronological order. This list does not include transfers, which are listed in the transfers section below, or match results, which are in the results section.

June:

- 13 - Coventry City draw Aldershot Town at home in the League Cup First Round.
- 16 - Life President Mike McGinnity and former player Cyrille Regis receive MBEs in The Queen's birthday honours list.
- 16 - Coventry City's fixtures for the 2008/2009 Championship season are announced
- 23 - Coventry City announce the new squad numbers for the forthcoming season.

July:

- 4 - Coventry City travel to Switzerland for pre-season tour where they will face Romanian side FC Brașov and Swiss side Stade Nyonnais.

August:

- 4 - Scott Dann is named new club captain for the 2008-09 season, taking over from Michael Doyle.
- 5 - Coventry City announce new association with Coventry Sphinx.
- 11 - Keiren Westwood on his debut, is named in the Official Football League Championship team of the week, following his performance against Norwich City.
- 13 - Coventry City celebrate their 125th anniversary, they mark the event with a victory over Aldershot Town in the League Cup.
- 13 - Coventry City draw Newcastle United at home in the League Cup Second Round.

September:

- 23 - Elliott Ward and Daniel Fox are named in the Official Football League Championship team of the week, following their performances against Queens Park Rangers.

October:

- 6 - Daniel Fox is named in the Official Football League Championship team of the week, following his performances against Cardiff City and Southampton.
- 9 - Marcus Hall is to be awarded a testimonial match after 14 season with the Sky Blues.

November:

- 8 - Former Coventry City and Belgium international defender Régis Genaux passes away from a heart failure due to a pulmonary embolism
- 24 - Keiren Westwood and Daniel Fox are named in the Official Football League Championship team of the week, following their performances against Sheffield Wednesday.
- 30 - Coventry City draw Kidderminster Harriers at home in the FA Cup Third Round.

December:

- 3 - Livingston captain James McPake signs a pre-contract agreement with the Sky Blues.
- 15 - Coventry City unveil limited edition 125th anniversary kit which will go on sale on the last day of the season.

January:

- 4 - Coventry City draw Torquay United away in the FA Cup Fourth Round.
- 12 - Defender Ben Turner signs new two-year contract, keeping him at the club until 2011.
- 14 - Coventry City take defender Quido Lanzaat on trial, with the view of making him a permanent signing.
- 20 - Daniel Fox's freekick against Swansea City is voted Sky Blues' 2008 Goal Of The Year.
- 25 - Coventry City draw Sunderland or Blackburn Rovers (dependent on reply) away in the FA Cup Fifth Round.
- 26 - Coventry City take Indian international forward Sunil Chhetri on trial, with the view of making him a permanent signing.

February:

- 2 - Michael Doyle is named in the Official Football League Championship team of the week, following his performances against Cardiff City and Derby County.
- 4 - Coventry City will face Blackburn Rovers away in the FA Cup Fifth Round, following Blackburn Rovers reply win over Sunderland.
- 15 - Coventry City will face Chelsea at home in the FA Cup Quarter Final if they can over come Blackburn Rovers.
- 23 - Scott Dann is named in the Official Football League Championship team of the week, following his performance against Birmingham City.

March:

- 5 - Chris Coleman is named the Football League Championship Manager of the Month for February.
- 8 - New attendance record of 31,407 is set at the Ricoh Arena as Coventry City host Chelsea in the FA Cup Quarter Finals.
- 12 - Jordan Henderson is called up to the England Under-19 squad for the first time - for their friendly against Czech Republic Under-19.
- 18 - Chris Coleman is charged with improper conduct and/or bringing the game into disrepute for criticising referee Steve Bennett's performance against Chelsea.

April:

- 6 - Ben Turner is named in the Official Football League Championship team of the week, following his performance against Reading.
- 15 - Keiren Westwood wins South Wales Supporters' Club's Player of The Season Award for 2008/2009.
- 27 - Keiren Westwood & Daniel Fox are named in the 2009 PFA Championship Team Of The Year.
- 30 - Goalkeeper Danny Ireland signs new two-year contract, keeping him at the club until 2011.

May:

- 4 - Aron Gunnarsson wins Community Player of The Season Award for 2008/2009.
- 4 - Ben Turner wins Young Player of The Season Award for 2008/2009.
- 4 - David Bell wins Goal of The Season Award for 2008/2009 for his strike against Doncaster Rovers.
- 4 - Clinton Morrison wins Top Scorer Award for 2008/2009.
- 4 - Daniel Fox wins Player' Player of The Season Award for 2008/2009.
- 4 - Aron Gunnarsson wins Player of The Season Award for 2008/2009.
- 13 - Assistant Manager Steve Kean is told he is free to move on to another club.
- 22 - Steve Harrison is appointed new Assistant Manager to Chris Coleman, replacing the outgoing Steve Kean
- 29 - Keiren Westwood & Leon Best win their first full international caps for Republic of Ireland in a friendly against Nigeria .

== Squad details ==
=== Players information ===
No.	Name	Nat.	Place of birth	Date of birth	Club apps.	Club goals	Int. caps	Int. goals	Previous club	Date joined	Fee
1	Keiren Westwood	(Republic of Ireland)	Manchester	23 October 1984	-	-	-	-	Carlisle United	18 June 2008	£500,000
2	Stephen Wright	(England)	Bootle	8 February 1980	-	-	-	-	Sunderland	8 August 2008	Free
3	Marcus Hall	(England)	Coventry	24 March 1976	235	2	-	-	Stoke City	21 February 2005	Free
4	Daniel Fox	(England)	Winsford	29 May 1986	18	1	-	-	Walsall	28 January 2008	Undisclosed
5	Elliott Ward	(England)	Harrow	19 January 1985	82	10	-	-	West Ham United	16 June 2006	£1,000,000
6	Scott Dann	(England)	Liverpool	14 February 1987	16	0	-	-	Walsall	31 January 2008	Undisclosed
7	Guillaume Beuzelin	(France)	Le Havre	14 April 1979	-	-	-	-	Hibernian	2 June 2008	Free
8	Michael Doyle	(Republic of Ireland)	Dublin	8 July 1981	230	17	1	0	Celtic	1 July 2003	Free
9	Leon Best	(Republic of Ireland)	Nottingham	19 September 1986	40	9	-	-	Southampton	6 July 2007	£650,000
10	Freddy Eastwood	(Wales)	Basildon	29 October 1983	-	-	9	4	Wolverhampton Wanderers	11 July 2008	£1,200,000
11	Julian Gray	(England)	Lewisham	21 September 1979	29	3	-	-	Birmingham City	10 July 2007	Free
12	Aron Gunnarsson	(Iceland)	Akureyri	22 April 1989	-	-	3	0	AZ Alkmaar	17 June 2008	Undisclosed
13	Dimitrios Konstantopoulos	(Greece)	Thessaloniki	29 November 1978	23	0	-	-	Hartlepool United	30 June 2007	Free
14	Leon McKenzie	(England)	Croydon	17 May 1978	44	9	-	-	Norwich City	31 August 2006	£1,000,000
16	Isaac Osbourne	(England)	Coventry	22 June 1986	93	0	-	-	N/A	1 January 2003	Trainee
17	Michael Mifsud	(Malta)	Pietà	17 April 1981	66	21	56	19	Lillestrøm	10 January 2007	Free
18	Jordan Henderson	(England)	Sunderland	17 June 1990	-	-	-	-	Sunderland	29 January 2009	Loan
19	Clinton Morrison	(Republic of Ireland)	Tooting	14 May 1979	-	-	36	9	Crystal Palace	7 August 2008	Free
20	Ben Turner	(England)	Birmingham	21 January 1988	27	0	-	-	N/A	1 July 2005	Trainee
21	Jay Tabb	(Republic of Ireland)	Tooting	21 February 1984	81	9	-	-	Brentford	30 June 2006	Undisclosed
21	James McPake	(Scotland)	Bellshill	24 June 1984	-	-	-	-	Livingston	2 February 2009	Undisclosed
22	Chris Birchall	(Trinidad and Tobago)	Stafford	5 May 1984	33	2	26	4	Port Vale	3 August 2006	£325,000
22	Lee Sawyer	(England)	London	9 October 1989	-	-	-	-	Chelsea	26 January 2009	Loan
23	Danny Ireland	(Australia)	Australia	30 September 1990	-	-	-	-	N/A	1 July 2007	Trainee
24	Robbie Simpson	(England)	Cambridge	15 March 1985	34	2	-	-	Cambridge United	3 August 2006	£40,000
25	Kevin Kyle	(Scotland)	Stranraer	7 June 1981	47	5	-	-	Sunderland	25 August 2006	£600,000
25	David Bell	(Republic of Ireland)	Kettering	21 January 1984	-	-	-	-	Norwich City	30 January 2009	£500,000
28	Gary Borrowdale	(England)	Sutton	16 July 1985	26	0	-	-	Crystal Palace	6 July 2007	£400,000
29	Kevin Thornton	(Republic of Ireland)	Drogheda	9 July 1986	50	2	-	-	N/A	20 September 2005	Trainee
31	Donovan Simmonds	(England)	England	12 October 1988	-	-	-	-	Charlton Athletic	1 July 2007	Free
33	Andy Marshall	(England)	Bury	14 April 1975	63	0	-	-	Millwall	30 June 2006	Free
35	Jermaine Grandison	(England)	Birmingham	15 December 1990	-	-	-	-	N/A	1 June 2008	Trainee
36	Adam Walker	(England)	Chester	23 March 1987	-	-	-	-	Chester City	1 June 2008	Free
37	Jordan Clarke	(England)	Coventry	19 November 1991	-	-	-	-	N/A	1 June 2008	Trainee
38	Sean Fraser	(England)	Coventry	8 February 1991	-	-	-	-	N/A	1 June 2008	Trainee
39	Curtis Wynter	(England)	Coventry	24 June 1991	-	-	-	-	N/A	1 June 2008	Trainee
40	Ashley Cain	(England)	Coventry	27 September 1990	-	-	-	-	N/A	1 June 2008	Trainee

== Matches ==
=== Pre-season friendlies ===
16 July 2008	FC Brașov	3–1	Coventry City	Martigny, Switzerland
18:30	Munteanu 2'; Zaharia 56'; Hadnagy 58'	(report)	Best 39'	Stadium: Stade d'Octodure

18 July 2008	Stade Nyonnais	1–0	Coventry City	Nyon, Switzerland
18:30	Pardo 90'	(report)		Stadium: Colovray Sports Centre

24 July 2008	Nuneaton Town	0–5	Coventry City XI	Nuneaton
19:00		(report)	Turner 10'; Kyle 35'; Birchall 65', 71'; Simmonds 83'	Stadium: Liberty Way

26 July 2008	Cambridge United	1–3	Coventry City	Cambridge
15:00	Farrell pen 78'	(report)	Eastwood 12', 56'; Fox 26'	Stadium: The Trade Recruitment Stadium; Attendance: 1,751

29 July 2008	Livingston	0–0	Coventry City	Livingston
19:45		(report)		Stadium: Almondvale Stadium

2 August 2008	Kilmarnock	0–2	Coventry City	Kilmarnock
15:00		(report)	Ward pen 55'; Gray 81'	Stadium: Rugby Park; Attendance: 2,168

=== Football League Championship ===
9 August 2008 1	Coventry City	2–0	Norwich City	Coventry
15:00	Ward pen 48'; McKenzie 86'	(report)		Stadium: Ricoh Arena; Attendance: 22,607; Referee: Andy D'Urso

16 August 2008 2	Barnsley	1–2	Coventry City	Barnsley
15:00	Howard 44'; Hume (red card) 80'	(report)	Eastwood 12'; Gray 68'	Stadium: Oakwell; Attendance: 12,987; Referee: Steve Bratt

23 August 2008 3	Coventry City	0–3	Bristol City	Coventry
15:00		(report)	Adebola 17'; McIndoe 54'; Brooker 90'	Stadium: Ricoh Arena; Attendance: 17,994; Referee: Phil Dowd

30 August 2008 4	Doncaster Rovers	1–0	Coventry City	Doncaster
15:00	Wellens 31'	(report)		Stadium: Keepmoat Stadium; Attendance: 11,806; Referee: Rob Shoebridge

13 September 2008 5	Coventry City	0–0	Preston North End	Coventry
15:00		(report)		Stadium: Ricoh Arena; Attendance: 16,544; Referee: Grant Hegley

17 September 2008 6	Sheffield United	1–1	Coventry City	Sheffield
19:45	Sharp 56'; Jihai (red card) 51'	(report)	Tabb 30'	Stadium: Bramall Lane; Attendance: 24,130; Referee: Darren Deadman

20 September 2008 7	Coventry City	1–0	Queens Park Rangers	Coventry
15:00	Ward pen 15'	(report)		Stadium: Ricoh Arena; Attendance: 16,718; Referee: Dean Whitestone

27 September 2008 8	Blackpool	1–1	Coventry City	Blackpool
15:00	Burgess 58'	(report)	Eastwood 69'	Stadium: Bloomfield Road; Attendance: 8,462; Referee: Michael Oliver

30 September 2008 9	Cardiff City	2–1	Coventry City	Cardiff
19:45	Bothroyd 31'; McCormack pen 85'	(report)	Dann 89'	Stadium: Ninian Park; Attendance: 16,312; Referee: Roger East

4 October 2008 10	Coventry City	4–1	Southampton	Coventry
17:20	Tabb 19', 87'; McKenzie 33'; Best 47'	(report)	Surman 63'	Stadium: Ricoh Arena; Attendance: 15,518; Referee: Mike Jones

18 October 2008 11	Wolverhampton Wanderers	2–1	Coventry City	Wolverhampton
15:00	Kightly 42'; Ebanks-Blake 59'	(report)	Mifsud 6'	Stadium: Molineux; Attendance: 25,893; Referee: Steve Bennett

21 October 2008 12	Coventry City	1–3	Burnley	Coventry
19:45	Ward pen 40'	(report)	Duff 52'; Blake 88'; Eagles 90'	Stadium: Ricoh Arena; Attendance: 14,621; Referee: Mike Thorpe

25 October 2008 13	Coventry City	1–1	Derby County	Coventry
15:00	Morrison 90'	(report)	Hulse 41'	Stadium: Ricoh Arena; Attendance: 18,430; Referee: Iain Williamson

28 October 2008 14	Southampton	1–1	Coventry City	Southampton
19:45	McGoldrick 68'	(report)	Morrison 75'	Stadium: St Mary's; Attendance: 14,226; Referee: Fred Graham

3 November 2008 15	Birmingham City	0–1	Coventry City	Birmingham
19:45		(report)	Morrison 53'	Stadium: St Andrew's; Attendance: 17,215; Referee: Anthony Bates

8 November 2008 16	Coventry City	0–2	Crystal Palace	Coventry
15:00		(report)	Hill 9'; Watson 53'	Stadium: Ricoh Arena; Attendance: 16,883; Referee: Clive Oliver

15 November 2008 17	Coventry City	0–1	Plymouth Argyle	Coventry
15:00		(report)	Noone 87'	Stadium: Ricoh Arena; Attendance: 18,528; Referee: Nigel Miller

22 November 2008 18	Sheffield Wednesday	0–1	Coventry City	Sheffield
15:00		(report)	Morrison 60'	Stadium: Hillsborough; Attendance: 16,119; Referee: Kevin Friend

25 November 2008 19	Coventry City	1–1	Swansea City	Coventry
19:45	Fox 87'	(report)	Gómez 67'	Stadium: Ricoh Arena; Attendance: 15,149; Referee: Mark Haywood

1 December 2008 20	Reading	3–1	Coventry City	Reading
18:00	Hunt 32', 62'; Cissé 37'	(report)	Fox 26'	Stadium: Madejski Stadium; Attendance: 16,803; Referee: Kevin Wright

6 December 2008 21	Coventry City	2–2	Nottingham Forest	Coventry
15:00	Ward 2'; Morrison 29'	(report)	Earnshaw 27'; Garner 61'	Stadium: Ricoh Arena; Attendance: 17,542; Referee: Neil Swarbrick

9 December 2008 22	Charlton Athletic	1–2	Coventry City	Charlton, London
19:45	Burton pen 49'	(report)	Simpson 40'; Fox 50'	Stadium: The Valley; Attendance: 20,427; Referee: Dean Whitestone

13 December 2008 23	Watford	2–1	Coventry City	Watford
15:00	Smith pen 62'; O'Toole 72'	(report)	Morrison 67'	Stadium: Vicarage Road; Attendance: 14,075; Referee: Jon Moss

20 December 2008 24	Coventry City	2–2	Ipswich Town	Coventry
15:00	Morrison 1'; Eastwood 56'	(report)	Lisbie 12', 65'	Stadium: Ricoh Arena; Attendance: 15,598; Referee: Rob Styles

26 December 2008 25	Swansea City	0–0	Coventry City	Swansea
15:00		(report)		Stadium: Liberty Stadium; Attendance: 17,603; Referee: Steve Tanner

28 December 2008 26	Coventry City	2–0	Sheffield Wednesday	Coventry
15:00	Morrison 11'; Simpson 82'	(report)		Stadium: Ricoh Arena; Attendance: 19,602; Referee: Graham Laws

10 January 2009 27	Queens Park Rangers	1–1	Coventry City	Shepherd's Bush, London
15:00	Blackstock 87'	(report)	Fox 73'; Wright (red card) 37'	Stadium: Loftus Road; Attendance: 13,330; Referee: Keith Stroud

17 January 2009 28	Coventry City	2–1	Blackpool	Coventry
15:00	Beuzelin 47'; Mifsud 51'	(report)	Campbell 25'	Stadium: Ricoh Arena; Attendance: 15,551; Referee: Craig Pawson

28 January 2009 29	Coventry City	0–2	Cardiff City	Coventry
19:45		(report)	Bothroyd 34'; McCormack 61'	Stadium: Ricoh Arena; Attendance: 14,922; Referee: Anthony Bates

31 January 2009 30	Derby County	2–1	Coventry City	Derby
15:00	Hulse 14'; Commons 16'	(report)	Doyle 53'	Stadium: Pride Park Stadium; Attendance: 29,710; Referee: Michael Jones

7 February 2009 31	Coventry City	2–1	Wolverhampton Wanderers	Coventry
15:00	Doyle 25'; McKenzie 75'	(report)	Vokes 72'	Stadium: Ricoh Arena; Attendance: 21,167; Referee: Michael Oliver

17 February 2009 32	Burnley	1–1	Coventry City	Burnley
19:45	Eagles 90'	(report)	Best 44'	Stadium: Turf Moor; Attendance: 14,595; Referee: David Foster

22 February 2009 33	Coventry City	1–0	Birmingham City	Coventry
15:00	Dann 2'	(report)		Stadium: Ricoh Arena; Attendance: 22,637; Referee: Clive Oliver

28 February 2009 34	Norwich City	1–2	Coventry City	Norwich
15:00	Grounds 53'	(report)	Henderson 19'; Fox 73'	Stadium: Carrow Road; Attendance: 24,450; Referee: Paul Taylor

4 March 2009 35	Coventry City	1–2	Sheffield United	Coventry
19:45	Dann 70'	(report)	Bromby 45'; Morgan 54'	Stadium: Ricoh Arena; Attendance: 16,300; Referee: Kevin Wright

11 March 2009 36	Bristol City	2–0	Coventry City	Bristol
19:45	McAllister 66'; Johnson 80'	(report)		Stadium: Ashton Gate; Attendance: 15,706; Referee: Phil Crossley

14 March 2009 37	Preston North End	2–1	Coventry City	Preston
15:00	Turner og 38'; Parkin 72'	(report)	Morrison 17'	Stadium: Deepdale; Attendance: 13,251; Referee: Kevin Friend

21 March 2009 38	Coventry City	1–0	Doncaster Rovers	Coventry
15:00	Bell 20'	(report)		Stadium: Ricoh Arena; Attendance: 18,498; Referee: Richard Beeby

4 April 2009 39	Coventry City	0–0	Reading	Coventry
15:00		(report)		Stadium: Ricoh Arena; Attendance: 17,218; Referee: Trevor Kettle

7 April 2009 40	Crystal Palace	1–1	Coventry City	Selhurst, London
20:00	Cadogan 72'	(report)	Gunnarsson 31'	Stadium: Selhurst Park; Attendance: 12,898; Referee: Fred Graham

11 April 2009 41	Plymouth Argyle	4–0	Coventry City	Plymouth
15:00	Barnes 14'; Mackie 26'; Judge 28'; Seip 37'	(report)		Stadium: Home Park; Attendance: 12,568; Referee: Clive Oliver

13 April 2009 42	Coventry City	0–0	Charlton Athletic	Coventry
15:00		(report)		Stadium: Ricoh Arena; Attendance: 16,121; Referee: Carl Boyeson

18 April 2009 43	Nottingham Forest	1–0	Coventry City	Nottingham
15:00	Perch 46'	(report)		Stadium: City Ground; Attendance: 27,856; Referee: Steve Tanner

21 April 2009 44	Coventry City	1–1	Barnsley	Coventry
19:45	Ward pen 90'	(report)	Bogdanovic 9'	Stadium: Ricoh Arena; Attendance: 15,035; Referee: Steve Cook

25 April 2009 45	Coventry City	2–3	Watford	Coventry
15:00	Eastwood 10'; Simpson 54'; Fox (red card) 82'	(report)	Smith 56'; Rasiak 61'; Priskin 74'	Stadium: Ricoh Arena; Attendance: 17,195; Referee: Russell Booth

3 May 2009 46	Ipswich Town	2–1	Coventry City	Ipswich
13:15	dos Santos 24'; Couñago 26'	(report)	Morrison 79'	Stadium: Portman Road; Attendance: 27,225; Referee: Graham Laws

=== League Cup ===
13 August 2008 First Round	Coventry City	3–1	Aldershot Town	Coventry
19:45	Morrison 31'; Simpson 58', 65'	(report)	Morgan 37'	Stadium: Ricoh Arena; Attendance: 9,293; Referee: Jarnail Singh

26 August 2008 Second Round	Coventry City	2–3	Newcastle United	Coventry
19:45	Morrison 45'; Dann 90'	(AET) (report)	Dann og 21'; Milner 38'; Owen 97'	Stadium: Ricoh Arena; Attendance: 19,249; Referee: Anthony Bates

=== FA Cup ===
3 January 2009 Third Round	Coventry City	2–0	Kidderminster Harriers	Coventry
15:00	McKenzie 51'; Best 81'	(report)		Stadium: Ricoh Arena; Attendance: 13,652; Referee: Mark Haywood

24 January 2009 Fourth Round	Torquay United	0–1	Coventry City	Torquay
15:00		(report)	Ward 87'	Stadium: Plainmoor; Attendance: 6,018; Referee: Kevin Friend

14 February 2009 Fifth Round	Blackburn Rovers	2–2	Coventry City	Blackburn
15:00	Santa Cruz 2'; Samba 90'	(report)	Gunnarsson 61'; Doyle 76'	Stadium: Ewood Park; Attendance: 15,053; Referee: Steve Tanner

24 February 2009 Fifth Round Replay	Coventry City	1–0	Blackburn Rovers	Coventry
20:00	Best 59'	(report)		Stadium: Ricoh Arena; Attendance: 22,793; Referee: Mike Riley

7 March 2009 Quarter Final	Coventry City	0–2	Chelsea	Coventry
12:30		(report)	Drogba 15'; Alex 72'	Stadium: Ricoh Arena; Attendance: 31,407; Referee: Steve Bennett

== Championship data ==
=== League table ===
Pos	Team	Pld	W	D	L	GF	GA	GD	Pts
15	Crystal Palace	46	15	12	19	52	55	−3	56 (Note: Crystal Palace were give a one-point deduction for using an ineligible player during a match against Sheffield United on 3 May 2009.)
16	Blackpool	46	13	17	16	47	58	−11	56
17	Coventry City	46	13	15	18	47	58	−11	54
18	Derby County	46	14	12	20	55	67	−12	54
19	Nottingham Forest	46	13	14	19	50	65	−15	53

Updated to match(es) played on 3 May 2009. Source: The Football League
Rules for classification: 1) points; 2) goal difference; 3) number of goals scored.

=== Results summary ===
Overall								Home						Away					
Pld	W	D	L	GF	GA	GD	Pts	W	D	L	GF	GA	GD	W	D	L	GF	GA	GD
46	13	15	18	47	58	−11	54	8	8	7	26	26	0	5	7	11	21	32	−11

Last updated: 3 May 2009.
Source: CCFC Championship Results

=== Round by round ===
Round	1	2	3	4	5	6	7	8	9	10	11	12	13	14	15	16	17	18	19	20	21	22	23	24	25	26	27	28	29	30	31	32	33	34	35	36	37	38	39	40	41	42	43	44	45	46
Ground	H	A	H	A	H	A	H	A	A	H	A	H	H	A	A	H	H	A	H	A	H	A	A	H	A	H	A	H	H	A	H	A	H	A	H	A	A	H	H	A	A	H	A	H	H	A
Result	W	W	L	L	D	D	W	D	L	W	L	L	D	D	W	L	L	W	D	L	D	W	L	D	D	W	D	W	L	L	W	D	W	W	L	L	L	W	D	D	L	D	L	D	L	L
Position	3	1	8	13	13	11	8	7	13	6	14	17	17	16	14	17	18	15	16	17	17	14	14	14	16	14	14	13	14	14	14	14	13	13	13	15	15	14	14	14	15	15	15	15	17	15

Updated to match(es) played on 3 May 2009. Source: Championship Results
A = Away; H = Home; W = Win; D = Draw; L = Loss

== Season statistics ==
=== Starts & Goals ===
No.	Pos	Nat	Player	Total		Championship		League Cup		FA Cup	
No.	Pos	Nat	Player	Apps	Goals	Apps	Goals	Apps	Goals	Apps	Goals
1	GK	(Republic of Ireland) IRL	Keiren Westwood	49	0	46	0	0	0	3	0
2	DF	(England) ENG	Stephen Wright	22	0	17	0	1	0	4	0
3	DF	(England) ENG	Marcus Hall	19	0	15	0	1	0	3	0
4	DF	(England) ENG	Daniel Fox	44	5	39	5	2	0	3	0
5	DF	(England) ENG	Elliott Ward	36	6	33	5	1	0	2	1
6	DF	(England) ENG	Scott Dann	34	4	31	3	2	1	1	0
7	MF	(France) FRA	Guillaume Beuzelin	32	1	28	1	2	0	2	0
8	MF	(Republic of Ireland) IRL	Michael Doyle	39	3	34	2	0	0	5	1
9	FW	(Republic of Ireland) IRL	Leon Best	19	4	16	2	0	0	3	2
10	FW	(Wales) WAL	Freddy Eastwood	39	4	33	4	1	0	5	0
11	MF	(England) ENG	Julian Gray (on loan to Fulham)	3	1	3	1	0	0	0	0
12	MF	(Iceland) ISL	Aron Gunnarsson	45	2	38	1	2	0	5	1
13	GK	(Greece) GRE	Dimitrios Konstantopoulos (on loan to Swansea City & Cardiff City)	0	0	0	0	0	0	0	0
14	FW	(England) ENG	Leon McKenzie	13	4	10	3	1	0	2	1
16	MF	(England) ENG	Isaac Osbourne	21	0	20	0	0	0	1	0
17	FW	(Malta) MLT	Michael Mifsud (on loan to Barnsley)	22	2	19	2	2	0	1	0
18	MF	(England) ENG	Jordan Henderson (on loan from Sunderland)	12	1	9	1	0	0	3	0
19	FW	(Republic of Ireland) IRL	Clinton Morrison	46	12	40	10	2	2	4	0
20	DF	(England) ENG	Ben Turner	27	0	22	0	1	0	4	0
21	MF	(Republic of Ireland) IRL	Jay Tabb	22	3	21	3	1	0	0	0
21	DF	(Scotland) SCO	James McPake	4	0	3	0	0	0	1	0
22	MF	(Trinidad and Tobago) TTO	Chris Birchall (on loan to Carlisle United)	0	0	0	0	0	0	0	0
22	MF	(England) ENG	Lee Sawyer (on loan from Chelsea)	1	0	1	0	0	0	0	0
23	GK	(Australia) AUS	Danny Ireland (on loan to Nuneaton Borough & Halesowen Town)	1	0	0	0	1	0	0	0
24	FW	(England) ENG	Robbie Simpson	16	5	14	3	1	2	1	0
25	FW	(Scotland) SCO	Kevin Kyle (on loan to Hartlepool United)	0	0	0	0	0	0	0	0
25	MF	(Republic of Ireland) IRL	David Bell	8	1	8	1	0	0	0	0
28	DF	(England) ENG	Gary Borrowdale (on loan to Colchester United & Queens Park Rangers)	0	0	0	0	0	0	0	0
29	MF	(Republic of Ireland) IRL	Kevin Thornton (on loan to Brighton & Hove Albion)	1	0	1	0	0	0	0	0
31	FW	(England) ENG	Donovan Simmonds (on loan to Kilmarnock)	0	0	0	0	0	0	0	0
33	GK	(England) ENG	Andy Marshall	3	0	0	0	1	0	2	0
35	MF	(England) ENG	Jermaine Grandison	0	0	0	0	0	0	0	0
36	MF	(England) ENG	Adam Walker	0	0	0	0	0	0	0	0
37	MF	(England) ENG	Jordan Clarke	0	0	0	0	0	0	0	0
38	MF	(England) ENG	Sean Fraser	0	0	0	0	0	0	0	0
39	DF	(England) ENG	Curtis Wynter	2	0	1	0	0	0	1	0
40	DF	(England) ENG	Ashley Cain	0	0	0	0	0	0	0	0

Notes:

- Player substitutions are not included.

=== Goalscorers ===
No.	Flag	Pos	Name	Championship	League Cup	FA Cup	Total
19	(Republic of Ireland)	FW	Clinton Morrison	10	2	0	12
5	(England)	DF	Elliott Ward	5	0	1	6
4	(England)	DF	Daniel Fox	5	0	0	5
24	(England)	FW	Robbie Simpson	3	2	0	5
6	(England)	DF	Scott Dann	3	1	0	4
9	(Republic of Ireland)	MF	Leon Best	2	0	2	4
10	(Wales)	FW	Freddy Eastwood	4	0	0	4
14	(England)	FW	Leon McKenzie	3	0	1	4
8	(Republic of Ireland)	MF	Michael Doyle	2	0	1	3
21	(Republic of Ireland)	MF	Jay Tabb	3	0	0	3
12	(Iceland)	MF	Aron Gunnarsson	1	0	1	2
17	(Malta)	FW	Michael Mifsud	2	0	0	2
7	(France)	MF	Guillaume Beuzelin	1	0	0	1
11	(England)	MF	Julian Gray	1	0	0	1
18	(England)	MF	Jordan Henderson	1	0	0	1
25	(Republic of Ireland)	MF	David Bell	1	0	0	1

=== Assists ===
No.	Flag	Pos	Name	Championship	League Cup	FA Cup	Total
10	(Wales)	FW	Freddy Eastwood	4	2	2	8
4	(England)	DF	Daniel Fox	5	1	1	7
7	(France)	MF	Guillaume Beuzelin	5	0	0	5
19	(Republic of Ireland)	FW	Clinton Morrison	4	0	0	4
12	(Iceland)	MF	Aron Gunnarsson	1	1	1	3
5	(England)	DF	Elliott Ward	2	0	0	2
14	(England)	FW	Leon McKenzie	2	0	0	2
18	(England)	MF	Jordan Henderson	2	0	0	2
2	(England)	DF	Stephen Wright	1	0	0	1
3	(England)	DF	Marcus Hall	1	0	0	1
8	(Republic of Ireland)	MF	Michael Doyle	0	0	1	1
9	(Republic of Ireland)	MF	Leon Best	1	0	0	1
16	(England)	MF	Isaac Osbourne	1	0	0	1
17	(Malta)	FW	Michael Mifsud	1	0	0	1
21	(Republic of Ireland)	MF	Jay Tabb	1	0	0	1
24	(England)	FW	Robbie Simpson	1	0	0	1
25	(Republic of Ireland)	MF	David Bell	1	0	0	1

=== Yellow cards ===
No.	Flag	Pos	Name	Championship	League Cup	FA Cup	Total
6	(Iceland)	MF	Aron Gunnarsson	9	1	2	(yellow card) 12
4	(England)	DF	Daniel Fox	8	1	0	(yellow card) 9
7	(France)	MF	Guillaume Beuzelin	7	0	2	(yellow card) 9
6	(England)	DF	Scott Dann	8	0	0	(yellow card) 8
19	(Republic of Ireland)	FW	Clinton Morrison	8	0	0	(yellow card) 8
2	(England)	DF	Stephen Wright	6	1	0	(yellow card) 7
16	(England)	MF	Isaac Osbourne	6	0	0	(yellow card) 6
21	(Republic of Ireland)	MF	Jay Tabb	4	0	0	(yellow card) 4
10	(Wales)	FW	Freddy Eastwood	3	0	1	(yellow card) 4
1	(Republic of Ireland)	GK	Keiren Westwood	3	0	1	(yellow card) 4
8	(Republic of Ireland)	MF	Michael Doyle	4	0	0	(yellow card) 4
5	(England)	DF	Elliott Ward	3	0	1	(yellow card) 4
14	(England)	FW	Leon McKenzie	3	0	0	(yellow card) 3
24	(England)	FW	Robbie Simpson	3	0	0	(yellow card) 3
9	(Republic of Ireland)	FW	Leon Best	2	0	0	(yellow card) 2
18	(England)	MF	Jordan Henderson	2	0	0	(yellow card) 2
3	(England)	DF	Marcus Hall	1	1	0	(yellow card) 2
20	(England)	DF	Ben Turner	2	0	0	(yellow card) 2
17	(Malta)	FW	Michael Mifsud	1	0	0	(yellow card) 1
21	(Scotland)	DF	James McPake	1	0	0	(yellow card) 1

=== Red cards ===
No.	Flag	Pos	Name	Championship	League Cup	FA Cup	Total
2	(England)	DF	Stephen Wright	1	0	0	(red card) 1
4	(England)	DF	Daniel Fox	1	0	0	(red card) 1

=== Captains ===
No.	Pos.	Name	Starts
6	DF	(England) Scott Dann	34
19	FW	(Republic of Ireland) Clinton Morrison	16
3	DF	(England) Marcus Hall	3

=== Penalties Awarded ===
Date	Success?	Penalty Taker	Opponent	Competition
2008-08-09	✓	(England) Elliott Ward	Norwich City	Championship
2008-09-17	✗	(England) Elliott Ward	Sheffield United	Championship
2008-09-20	✓	(England) Elliott Ward	Queens Park Rangers	Championship
2008-10-04	✗	(England) Elliott Ward	Southampton	Championship
2008-10-21	✓	(England) Elliott Ward	Burnley	Championship
2008-04-21	✓	(England) Elliott Ward	Barnsley	Championship

=== Suspensions served ===
Date	Matches Missed	Suspended Player	Reason	Missed Opponents
2008-11-22	1	(Iceland) Aron Gunnarsson	Reached 5 Yellow Cards	Sheffield Wednesday (A)
2008-12-06	1	(England) Daniel Fox	Reached 5 Yellow Cards	Nottingham Forest (H)
2009-01-17	3	(England) Stephen Wright	Sent Off vs. Queens Park Rangers	Blackpool (H), Torquay United (A), Cardiff City (H)
2009-01-31	2	(Iceland) Aron Gunnarsson	Reached 10 Yellow Cards	Derby County (A), Wolverhampton Wanderers (H)
2009-02-14	1	(England) Stephen Wright	Reached 5 Yellow Cards	Blackburn Rovers (A)
2009-02-23	1	(England) Scott Dann	Reached 5 Yellow Cards	Blackburn Rovers (H)
2009-05-03	1	(England) Daniel Fox	Sent Off vs. Watford	Ipswich Town (A)

=== Monthly & Weekly Awards ===
Championship Team of the Week	11-08-2008	Keiren Westwood
Championship Team of the Week	23-09-2008	Elliott Ward
Championship Team of the Week	23-09-2008	Daniel Fox
Championship Team of the Week	06-10-2008	Daniel Fox
Championship Team of the Week	24-11-2008	Keiren Westwood
Championship Team of the Week	24-11-2008	Daniel Fox
Championship Team of the Week	02-02-2009	Michael Doyle
Championship Team of the Week	23-02-2009	Scott Dann
Championship Manager of the Month	February	Chris Coleman
Championship Team of the Week	06-04-2009	Ben Turner
PFA Championship Team Of The Year	2008/2009	Keiren Westwood
PFA Championship Team Of The Year	2008/2009	Daniel Fox

=== End of Season Awards ===
Player of The Season Award	Aron Gunnarsson
Young Player of The Season Award	Ben Turner
Players' Player of The Season Award	Daniel Fox
Top Scorer Award	Clinton Morrison
Goal of The Season Award	David Bell
Community Player of The Season Award	Aron Gunnarsson

=== Overall ===
Games played	53 (46 Championship, 2 League Cup, 5 FA Cup)
Games won	17 (13 Championship, 1 League Cup, 3 FA Cup)
Games drawn	16 (15 Championship, 1 FA Cup)
Games lost	20 (18 Championship, 1 League Cup, 1 FA Cup)
Goals scored	58 (47 Championship, 5 League Cup, 6 FA Cup)
Goals conceded	66 (58 Championship, 4 League Cup, 4 FA Cup)
Goal difference	-8
Yellow cards	95 (84 Championship, 4 League Cup, 7 FA Cup)
Red cards	2 (2 Championship)
Worst discipline	(Iceland) Aron Gunnarsson (12 (yellow card) , 0 (red card) )
Best result	4-1 (H) v Southampton - Championship - 2008.10.04
Worst result	4-0 (A) v Plymouth Argyle - Championship - 2009.04.11
Most appearances	(Republic of Ireland) Keiren Westwood (49 appearances)
Top scorer	(Republic of Ireland) Clinton Morrison (12 goals)
Points	54 / 138 (39.14%)

== Transfers ==
=== Transfers in ===
Player	From	Date	Fee
(France) Guillaume Beuzelin	Hibernian	2 June 2008	Free
(Iceland) Aron Gunnarsson	AZ Alkmaar	17 June 2008	£250,000
(Republic of Ireland) Keiren Westwood	Carlisle United	18 June 2008	£750,000
(Wales) Freddy Eastwood	Wolverhampton Wanderers	12 July 2008	£1,200,000
(Republic of Ireland) Clinton Morrison	Crystal Palace	7 August 2008	Free
(England) Stephen Wright	Sunderland	8 August 2008	Free
(Republic of Ireland) David Bell	Norwich City	30 January 2009	£500,000
(Scotland) James McPake	Livingston	2 February 2009	Undisclosed

=== Transfers out ===
Player	To	Date	Fee
(Netherlands) Arjan De Zeeuw	ADO '20	5 May 2008	Released
(Northern Ireland) Michael Hughes		5 May 2008	Released
(Republic of Ireland) Colin Hawkins	Brighton & Hove Albion	5 May 2008	Released
(England) Stuart Giddings	Hinckley United	5 May 2008	Released
(Netherlands) Ellery Cairo	NAC Breda	5 May 2008	Released
(England) Wayne Andrews	Luton Town	5 May 2008	Released
(England) Lee Hildreth	Tamworth	5 May 2008	Released
(England) Liam Davis	Northampton Town	5 May 2008	Released
(England) Stephen Hughes	Walsall	12 June 2008	Free
(Scotland) David McNamee	Plymouth Argyle	14 July 2008	Free
(England) Gary Borrowdale	Queens Park Rangers	2 January 2009	£350,000
(Trinidad and Tobago) Chris Birchall	Brighton & Hove Albion	2 January 2009	Free
(Republic of Ireland) Jay Tabb	Reading	19 January 2009	£500,000
(Scotland) Kevin Kyle	Kilmarnock	28 January 2009	Free
(England) Julian Gray	Fulham	2 February 2009	Undisclosed

=== Loans in ===
Player	From	Date from	Date until
(England) Lee Sawyer	Chelsea	26 January 2009	22 February 2009
(England) Jordan Henderson	Sunderland	29 January 2009	8 April 2009

=== Loans out ===
Player	To	Date from	Date until
(England) Donovan Simmonds	Kilmarnock	13 August 2008	30 June 2009
(England) Julian Gray	Fulham	1 September 2008	2 February 2009
(England) Gary Borrowdale	Colchester United	25 September 2008	16 October 2008
(Republic of Ireland) Kevin Thornton	Brighton and Hove Albion	26 September 2008	4 November 2008
(Scotland) Kevin Kyle	Hartlepool United	1 October 2008	28 December 2008
(Australia) Danny Ireland	Nuneaton Borough	6 October 2008	6 November 2008
(Greece) Dimitrios Konstantopoulos	Swansea City	27 October 2008	28 December 2008
(England) Gary Borrowdale	Queens Park Rangers	26 November 2008	31 December 2008
(Trinidad and Tobago) Chris Birchall	Carlisle United	27 November 2008	31 December 2008
(Australia) Danny Ireland	Halesowen Town	15 December 2008	7 January 2009
(Greece) Dimitrios Konstantopoulos	Swansea City	8 January 2009	31 January 2009
(Malta) Michael Mifsud	Barnsley	2 February 2009	31 May 2009
(Greece) Dimitrios Konstantopoulos	Cardiff City	11 February 2009	31 May 2009

== Kit profile ==
Supplier: Puma
Sponsor(s): Home - Cassidy Group
Sponsor: Away - StadiArena

Home Strip	Away Strip
