= David Bell (footballer, born 1984) =

English footballer

Personal information
- Full name: David Anthony Bell
- Date of birth: 21 January 1984 (age 42)
- Place of birth: Wellingborough, Northamptonshire, England
- Position: Midfielder

Senior career*
Years	Team	Apps	(Gls)
2000–2006	Rushden & Diamonds	122	(10)
2006–2008	Luton Town	75	(7)
2008	→ Leicester City (loan)	6	(0)
2008–2009	Norwich City	19	(0)
2009–2013	Coventry City	94	(5)
2013–2014	Notts County	13	(0)
2014–2015	King's Lynn Town	12	(1)
2016–2017	Corby Town	5	(0)
Total		346	(23)

International career
2004–2005	Republic of Ireland U21	2	(0)
2007	Republic of Ireland B	1	(0)

Managerial career
- 2017: Corby Town
- * Club domestic league appearances and goals

David Anthony Bell (born 21 January 1984) is a former professional footballer. A midfielder, he played for Norwich City, Coventry City, Luton Town, Rushden & Diamonds and Notts County.

== Playing career ==
In the 2006–07 season, Bell went from a squad player at Luton to one of the club's key players under Mike Newell and Kevin Blackwell. In January 2007 he was given a contract extension, running through to 2010. In the end of season awards, Bell won the Internet Player of the Season and Young Supporters' Player of the Season.

On 28 March 2008, he joined Leicester City on loan with a view to a permanent transfer. However, Leicester's relegation to League One meant the permanent deal did not go ahead.

On 23 July 2008, it was confirmed that Bell had agreed a three-year deal with Norwich City, signing for an undisclosed fee. His debut for the club was delayed by an ankle injury incurred before his signing. He finally made his first appearance in a home defeat to Derby County on 4 October 2008.

On 29 January 2009, he signed for Coventry City, for a fee believed to be on the region of £500,000.

Bell scored his first goal for Coventry on 21 March 2009 with a 45-yard strike against Doncaster at the Ricoh Arena. he scored in Coventry's FA Cup 3rd round tie draw at Premier League club Portsmouth on 2 January 2010.

On 19 July 2013, Bell signed for Notts County after being released from his contract with Coventry. On 24 January 2014, he was released by Notts County by mutual consent and signed for King's Lynn Town.

== Coaching career ==
On 19 October 2016, Bell was appointed as assistant manager to fellow former Rushden & Diamonds academy product Gary Mills at Corby Town. Bell became Corby manager in May 2017 after Mills left the club. He was sacked in September 2017.

== Career statistics ==
Appearances and goals by club, season and competition
Club	Season	League			FA Cup		League Cup		Other (Note: Includes FA Trophy and Football League Trophy.)		Total	
Club	Season	Division	Apps	Goals	Apps	Goals	Apps	Goals	Apps	Goals	Apps	Goals
Rushden & Diamonds	2000–01	Conference	0	0	0	0	0	0	1	0	1	0
Rushden & Diamonds	2001–02	Third Division	1	0	0	0	0	0	1	0	2	0
Rushden & Diamonds	2002–03	Third Division	30	3	3	0	1	0	1	0	35	3
Rushden & Diamonds	2003–04	Second Division	37	1	1	0	1	0	1	0	40	1
Rushden & Diamonds	2004–05	League Two	40	3	1	0	1	0	1	0	43	3
Rushden & Diamonds	2005–06	League Two	14	3	3	0	1	0	1	0	19	3
Rushden & Diamonds	Total		122	10	8	0	4	0	6	0	140	10
Luton Town	2005–06	Championship	9	0	0	0	0	0	0	0	9	0
Luton Town	2006–07	Championship	34	3	2	0	3	0	0	0	39	3
Luton Town	2007–08	League One	32	4	5	0	3	1	1	0	41	5
Luton Town	Total		75	7	7	0	6	1	1	0	89	8
Leicester City (loan)	2007–08	Championship	6	0	0	0	0	0	0	0	6	0
Norwich City	2008–09	Championship	19	0	1	0	0	0	0	0	20	0
Coventry City	2008–09	Championship	9	1	0	0	0	0	0	0	9	1
Coventry City	2009–10	Championship	28	2	2	1	0	0	0	0	30	3
Coventry City	2010–11	Championship	22	2	0	0	1	0	0	0	23	2
Coventry City	2011–12	Championship	28	0	0	0	1	0	0	0	29	0
Coventry City	2012–13	League One	7	0	0	0	0	0	0	0	7	0
Coventry City	Total		94	5	2	1	2	0	0	0	98	6
Career total			316	22	18	1	12	1	7	0	353	24

== Honours ==
Rushden & Diamonds

- Football League Third Division: 2002–03
