= Adam Walker (footballer) =

English footballer (born 1991)

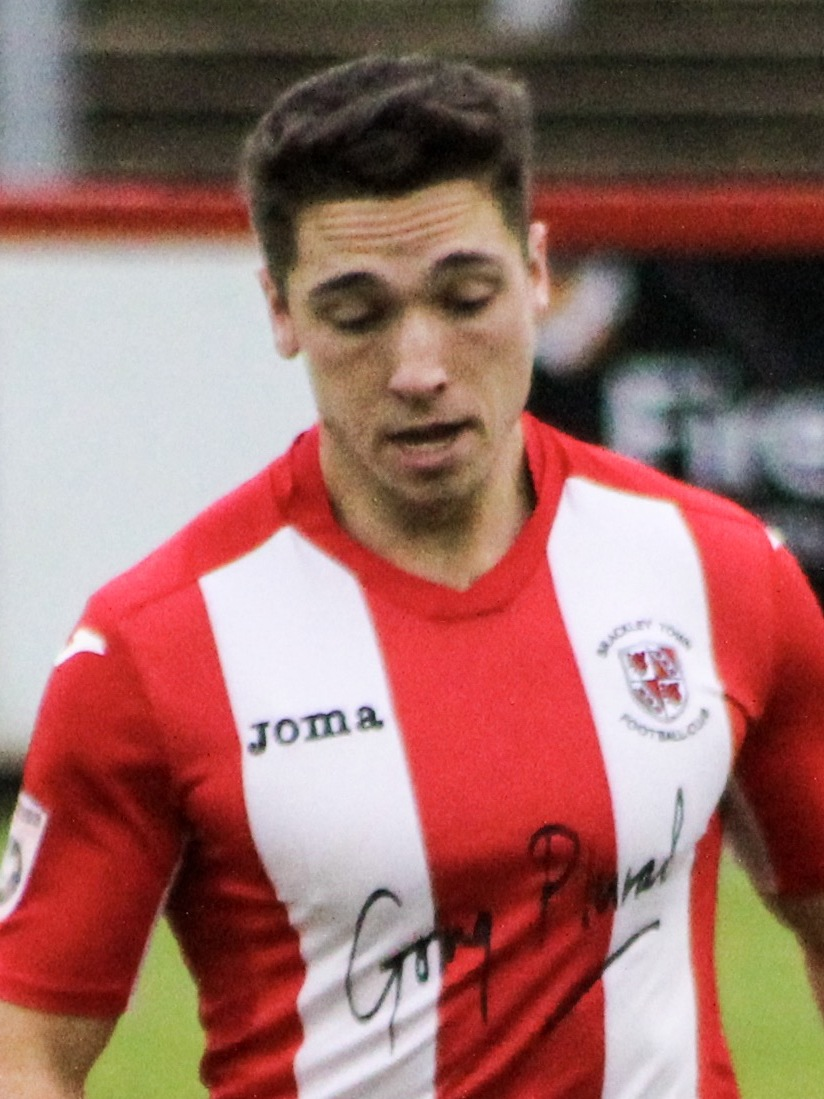

Personal information
- Full name: Adam Richard Walker
- Date of birth: 22 January 1991 (age 35)
- Place of birth: Meriden, England
- Height: 1.68 m (5 ft 6 in)
- Position: Midfielder

Youth career
- Coventry City

Senior career*
Years	Team	Apps	(Gls)
2008–2010	Coventry City	2	(0)
2009–2010	→ Nuneaton Town	?	(?)
2010–2015	Nuneaton Town	193	(23)
2015–2016	Solihull Moors	29	(1)
2016–2019	Brackley Town	120	(3)
2019–2022	Telford United	75	(3)
2022–2026	Leamington	81	(5)
2026-	Racing Club Warwick	14	(1)
- * Club domestic league appearances and goals as of 13:56, 7 July 2020 (UTC)

Adam Richard Walker (born 22 January 1991) is an English footballer who plays as a midfielder.

== Career ==
Walker made his professional debut for Coventry City on 28 December 2008 as a substitute in a 2–0 Football League Championship win against Sheffield Wednesday.

He made his second appearance in a 0–0 draw against Charlton Athletic at the Ricoh Arena.

Walker joined Nuneaton Town on loan on 28 October 2009, before joining them on a permanent deal on 1 April 2010 after being released by Coventry City.

After a successful term at Brackley Town, Walker joined National League North rivals AFC Telford United in May 2019 on a one-year deal.

Walker played for over three seasons at the Shropshire club, making over 75 appearances and eventually going on to become club captain. His contract was ended by mutual termination in January 2022, which lead to him joining Leamington FC on a permanent transfer on 26 January 2022.

Following relegation in the summer of 2026, Walker left Leamington to sign a permanent deal with local rivals Racing Club Warwick. He scored his first goal in a 0-1 win over Rushall Olympic.

== Career statistics ==
As of match played 9 December 2017

Appearances and goals by club, season and competition
Club	Season	League			FA Cup		League Cup		Other		Total	
Club	Season	Division	Apps	Goals	Apps	Goals	Apps	Goals	Apps	Goals	Apps	Goals
Coventry City	2008–09	Championship	2	0	0	0	0	0	—		2	0
Coventry City	2009–10	Championship	0	0	0	0	1	0	—		1	0
Coventry City	Coventry total		2	0	0	0	1	0	0	0	3	0
Nuneaton Town (loan)	2009–10	SFL - Premier Division	?	?	?	?	—		?	?	?	?
Nuneaton Town	2010–11	Conference North	34	5	2	0	—		0	0	36	5
Nuneaton Town	2011–12	Conference North	42	5	1	0	—		1 (Note: Appearance in the FA Trophy)	0	44	5
Nuneaton Town	2012–13	Conference Premier	43	8	4	0	—		1	0	48	8
Nuneaton Town	2013–14	Conference Premier	41	4	1	0	—		3	0	45	4
Nuneaton Town	2014–15	Conference Premier	41	2	1	0	—		1	0	43	2
Nuneaton Town	Nuneaton total		201	24	9	0	0	0	6	0	216	24
Solihull Moors	2015–16	National League North	29	1	0	0	—		2	0	31	1
Brackley Town	2016–17	National League North	42	1	4	0	—		6	0	52	1
Brackley Town	2017–18	National League North	18	0	2	1	—		0	0	20	1
Brackley Town	Brackley total		60	1	6	1	0	0	6	0	72	2
Career total			292	26	15	1	1	0	14	0	322	27

== Honours ==
Brackley Town

- FA Trophy: 2017–18
