= Marcus Hall =

English footballer (born 1976)

Personal information
- Full name: Marcus Thomas Jackson Hall
- Date of birth: 24 March 1976 (age 50)
- Place of birth: Coventry, England
- Height: 6 ft 1 in (1.85 m)
- Position: Defender

Youth career
- 1992–1994: Coventry City

Senior career*
Years	Team	Apps	(Gls)
1994–2002	Coventry City	132	(2)
2002	Nottingham Forest	1	(0)
2002	Southampton	0	(0)
2002–2005	Stoke City	78	(1)
2005–2010	Coventry City	138	(0)
2010–2011	Northampton Town	24	(0)
Total		373	(3)

International career
1996–1997	England U21	8	(2)
- * Club domestic league appearances and goals

Marcus Thomas Jackson Hall (born 24 March 1976) is an English former footballer who played as a defender from 1994 until 2011.

He had two spells with Coventry City, playing in the Premier League in his first, as well as playing in the Football League for Nottingham Forest, Stoke City and Northampton Town. He was also contracted to Southampton whilst a Premier League team but failed to make any appearances. During the 1996–97 campaign he was handed 8 England U21 caps, scoring twice.

== Club career ==
Hall was born in Coventry and began his career with his local side, Coventry City. He progressed through the youth ranks at Highfield Road and made his debut against Tottenham Hotspur on New Year's Eve in 1994–95 with the "Sky Blues" losing 4–0. His first start was a televised home match against Manchester United which Hall described as a 'frightening experience'. Hall spent eight seasons with the Sky Blues making 157 appearances scoring four goals. He left Coventry to join Nottingham Forest in the 2002–03 season, but only played one game against Portsmouth for Forest before moving back to the Premier League with Southampton where he failed to make an appearance.

Hall joined Stoke City in December 2002. He played in 27 matches in 2002–03 helping the club avoid relegation on the final day of the season. In 2003–04 Hall played in 38 matches as Stoke finished in mid-table. He played in 22 matches in 2004–05 and scored his only goal for Stoke against Derby County on 30 August 2004. He made a return to Coventry City in January 2005 on a free transfer.

He spent the next six seasons with Coventry making 151 appearances and was granted a testimonial match against Everton following 10 years of service with Coventry which ended in a 2–2 draw. At the end of the 2009–10 season, Coventry City told Hall he was surplus to requirements and he was subsequently released. Hall signed for Northampton Town on a one-year deal on 1 August 2010. In May 2011, along with seven other players, he was told his contract would not be renewed by the club after making 28 appearances.

== International career ==
Hall is a former captain of the England U21s, and has scored goals at this level. He has also played in an England B international.

== Career statistics ==
Appearances and goals by club, season and competition
Club	Season	League			FA Cup		League Cup		Other		Total	
Club	Season	Division	Apps	Goals	Apps	Goals	Apps	Goals	Apps	Goals	Apps	Goals
Coventry City	1994–95	Premier League	5	0	0	0	0	0	—		5	0
Coventry City	1995–96	Premier League	25	0	2	0	4	0	—		31	0
Coventry City	1996–97	Premier League	13	0	3	0	2	0	—		18	0
Coventry City	1997–98	Premier League	25	1	4	0	4	1	—		33	2
Coventry City	1998–99	Premier League	5	0	0	0	1	0	—		6	0
Coventry City	1999–2000	Premier League	9	0	0	0	1	0	—		10	0
Coventry City	2000–01	Premier League	21	0	1	0	2	1	—		24	1
Coventry City	2001–02	First Division	29	1	0	0	1	0	—		30	1
Coventry City	Total		132	2	10	0	15	2	—		157	4
Nottingham Forest	2002–03	First Division	1	0	0	0	0	0	0	0	1	0
Southampton	2002–03	Premier League	0	0	0	0	0	0	—		0	0
Stoke City	2002–03	First Division	24	0	3	0	0	0	—		27	0
Stoke City	2003–04	First Division	35	0	1	0	2	0	—		38	0
Stoke City	2004–05	Championship	20	1	1	0	1	0	—		22	1
Stoke City	Total		79	1	5	0	3	0	—		87	1
Coventry City	2004–05	Championship	10	0	0	0	0	0	—		10	0
Coventry City	2005–06	Championship	39	0	3	0	1	0	—		43	0
Coventry City	2006–07	Championship	40	0	1	0	1	0	—		42	0
Coventry City	2007–08	Championship	18	0	1	0	2	0	—		20	0
Coventry City	2008–09	Championship	23	0	3	0	1	0	—		27	0
Coventry City	2009–10	Championship	8	0	0	0	0	0	—		8	0
Coventry City	Total		138	0	8	0	5	0	—		151	0
Northampton Town	2010–11	League Two	24	0	0	0	3	0	1 (Note: Appearance in Football League Trophy)	0	28	0
Career total			374	3	23	0	26	2	1	0	424	5
