= Danny Fox =

Association football player (born 1986)

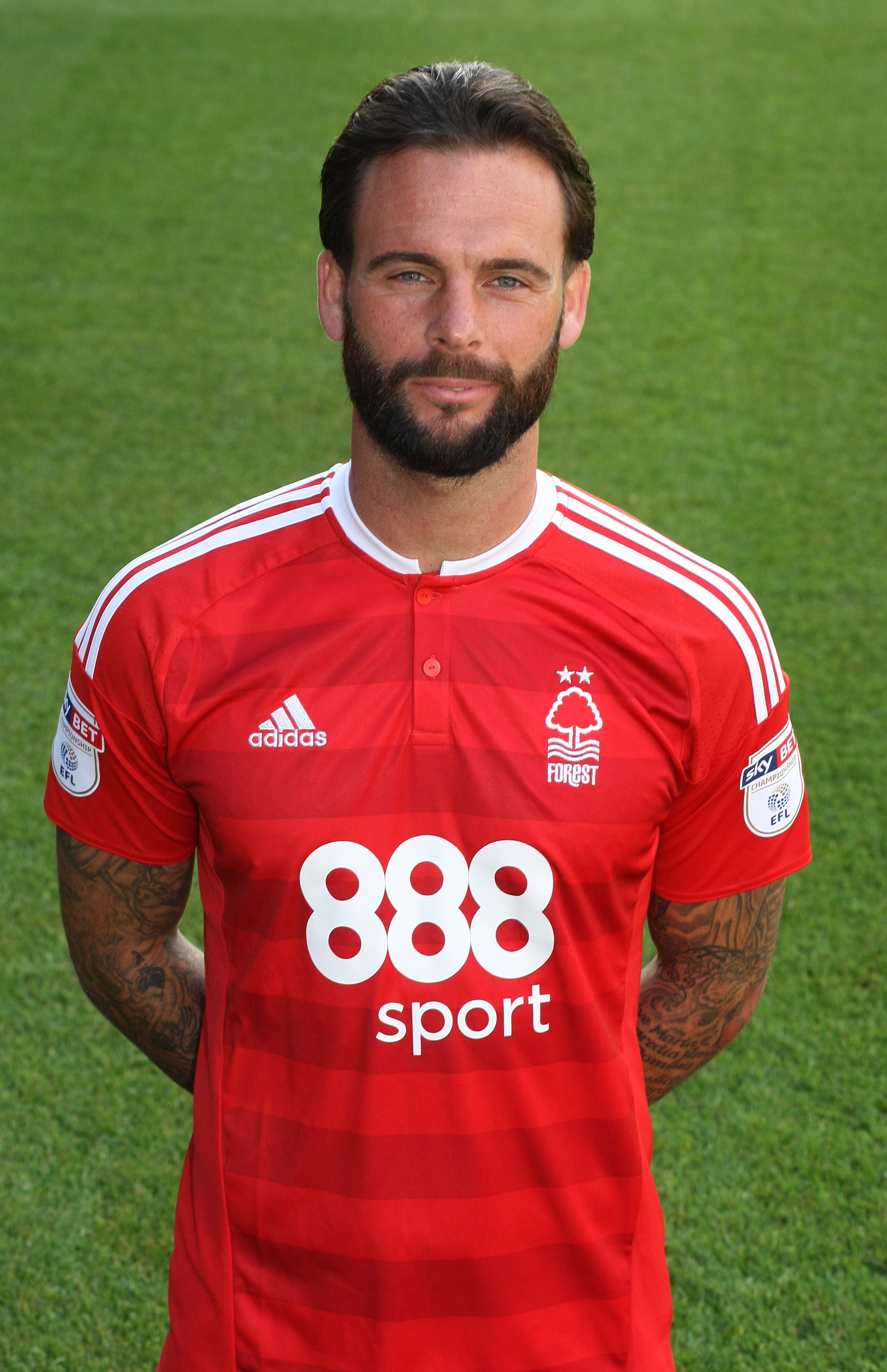
- Fox with Nottingham Forest in 2016

Personal information
- Full name: Daniel Fox
- Date of birth: 29 May 1986 (age 40)
- Place of birth: Winsford, England
- Height: 6 ft 0 in (1.83 m)
- Position: Centre-back

Team information
- Current team: Winsford Town

Youth career
- 2003–2004: Everton

Senior career*
Years	Team	Apps	(Gls)
2004–2005	Everton	0	(0)
2005	→ Stranraer (loan)	11	(1)
2005–2008	Walsall	99	(6)
2008–2009	Coventry City	57	(6)
2009–2010	Celtic	15	(0)
2010–2011	Burnley	50	(1)
2011–2014	Southampton	64	(1)
2014	→ Nottingham Forest (loan)	14	(0)
2014–2019	Nottingham Forest	101	(0)
2019–2020	Wigan Athletic	15	(0)
2020–2021	East Bengal	16	(1)
2023–	Winsford Town	16	(6)

International career
2008	England U21	1	(0)
2009–2012	Scotland	4	(0)
- * Club domestic league appearances and goals

Daniel Fox (born 29 May 1986) is a professional footballer who plays as a defender for Cheshire Football League League One club Winsford Town.

He represented England at under-21 international level, has since been selected for Scotland national team, making his debut in the November 2009 against Wales.

== Club career ==
=== Everton ===
Fox was born in Winsford, Cheshire and joined his boyhood club Everton's youth system at thirteen from Liverpool. As he progressed through the academy, Fox was offered a full-time contract with the club, which he signed on 19 May 2004.

After signing a full-time contract with the club, Fox continued to develop in the reserve team but never made a first team appearance despite being named on the bench for Everton's home match against Aston Villa in October 2004 as an 18-year-old.

=== Stranraer ===
On 2 February 2005, Fox was loaned out by Everton to Stranraer, where he played 11 games (scoring once against Berwick Rangers) and helped them secure promotion to the Scottish First Division before his eventual release from Everton in the summer of 2005.

=== Walsall ===
After leaving Everton, Walsall moved quickly to sign Fox, alongside Everton youth teammate Anthony Gerrard on 3 June 2005.

Fox made his debut for the club against Rotherham United in the opening game of the season, making first start. In the next game against Southend United, Fox provided an assist for Matty Fryatt to score the club's first goal in the match, as they drew 2–2 and was named Man of the Match by Birmingham Mail. Fox's performance throughout August earned him Evening Mail Saddlers Player of the Month and since making his debut, Fox quickly becoming a regular in the first team. Despite the injuries and suspension, Fox finished his first season at Walsall, making 33 appearances. Fox later reflected the 2005–06 season, in which he stated the poor season made him "more mature as a player and a person".

In the 2006–07 season, Fox started the season well when he scored his first goal for the club in a 5–0 win against Peterborough United on 12 September 2006 and then scored his second goal of the season, two weeks later on 23 September 2006, in a 2–1 win over Bristol Rovers. Fox then scored his third goal against Peterborough United on 1 January 2007, for the second time this season, in a 2–0 win. Despite missing two matches in the 2006–07 season, due to injury and suspension., Fox ended the season with 44 appearances and three goals, as he helped the club gain promotion to League One.

In the 2007–08 season saw Fox continued to make an impression at Walsall when he scored his first goal of the season against Gillingham on 1 September 2007. Two weeks later, on 15 September 2007, Fox scored again, in a 2–1 win over Millwall. Fox scored again three weeks later on 2 October 2007, in a 3–2 win over Doncaster Rovers. However, on 26 December 2007, Fox received the first red card of his career in a 1–1 draw against Port Vale after a second bookable offence. In the January transfer window, Fox's future was in doubt after attracted interests from clubs, including Leeds United.

During his time at Walsall, Fox made over 100 appearances and scoring six times in all competitions, as well as, having a positive attitude.

=== Coventry City ===
On 28 January 2008, Fox joined Coventry City in a double transfer deal (with his defensive partner Scott Dann also moving to the Ricoh Arena only 72 hours later), after agreeing personal terms and a passing a medical. Before this, Colchester United had agreed a fee with Walsall for Fox.

Just days after signing for Coventry City, Fox made his debut for the club in a 1–0 defeat against Hull City. Two months after making his debut, Fox scored his first goal in a 5–1 win over Colchester United. In the next game against Wolverhampton Wanderers on 26 April 2008, Fox provided an assist for Elliott Ward, in a 1–1 draw. As the 2007–08 season progressed, in which Fox made eighteen appearances and scoring once, Fox immediately made an impact in the first team.

Ahead of the 2008–09 season, Fox attracted interests from Premier League clubs, though Ray Ranson made it clear that Fox and Dann were not for sale. Despite this, Fox remained in the first team in his first full season at the club. Fox scored his first goal of the season, in a 1–1 draw against Swansea City on 25 November 2008 and scored in the next game on 1 December 2008, in a 3–1 loss against Reading. After serving a suspension for one match, Fox scored on his return in the next game, in a 1–1 draw against Charlton Athletic on 9 December 2008. After an injury struck him in late–December, Fox scored on his return on 10 January 2009, in a 1–1 draw against Queens Park Rangers. Fox scored his sixth goal of the season on 28 February 2009, in a 2–1 win over Norwich City, in which he stated afterwards that it was his best goal ever. Despite suffering from an injury once again in March and being sent–off, in a 3–2 win over Watford on 25 April 2009, Fox, alongside his teammate Keiren Westwood, were named in the Championship PFA Team of the Year for 2009 in his debut season at the club, as well as, winning the Players' Player of the Year award for the 2008–09 season. In the 2008–09 season, Fox finished the season, scoring six times in forty–five appearances in all competitions. The 2008–09 season was also a turning for Fox, as he began to taking free–kicks, in which went in four of the five times.

With the club keen on extending his contract, Fox, himself, stated he wanted to stay at the club. However, Fox continued to attract interests from Premier League clubs, such as, Blackburn Rovers, Aston Villa and Newcastle United. Fox later credited Coventry City for helping him turn his life around.

=== Celtic ===
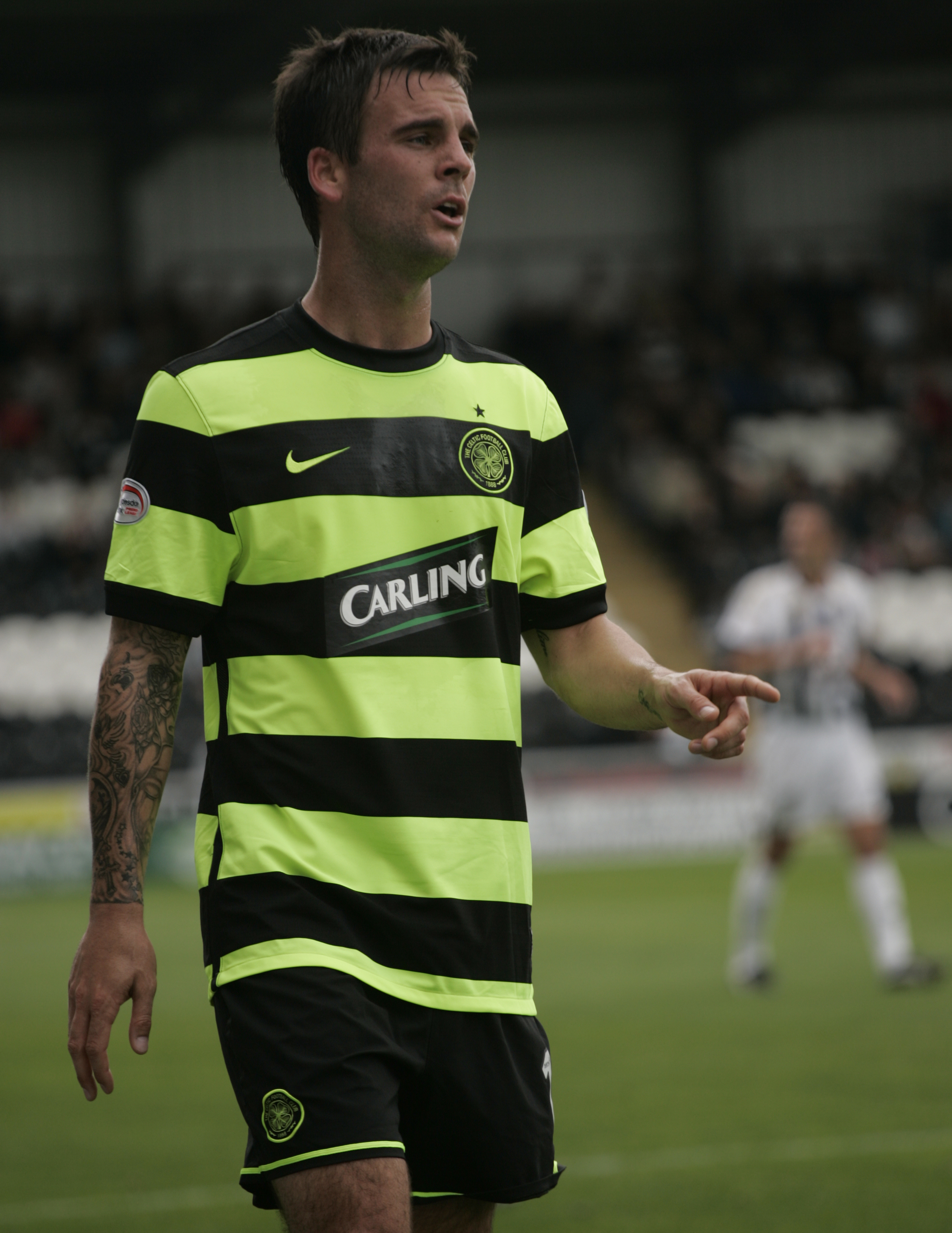
Fox playing for Celtic

On 24 July 2009, Fox signed for Celtic for an undisclosed fee (believed to be £1.5 million) Coventry's manager, Chris Coleman expressed his disappointment at losing Fox: "I was determined not to lose . . . Danny Fox and so were the club, but it is hard once players are offered a lot of money to go to big, big clubs."

Fox made his competitive debut for Celtic in the UEFA Champions League qualifiers against Dynamo Moscow. He became a regular free kick taker for Celtic, but did not score a goal, although he did provide assists in games against St Johnstone and Dundee United. Fox made his last appearance for Celtic in an Old Firm derby against Rangers in a 1–1 draw, where he played 90 minutes.

=== Burnley ===
On 29 January 2010, after just six months in Glasgow, Fox joined Premier League club Burnley on a three-and-a-half-year contract for an undisclosed fee, believed to be £1.8 million.

On his debut for Burnley, Fox claimed an assist and the winning goal against West Ham United on 6 February in a 2–1 home win. Fox afterwards claimed that his debut with Burnley was "his best day in football". His efforts lifted Burnley above West Ham and out of the relegation zone. Despite this, Burnley went on to be relegated to the Championship. Fox went on to make fourteen appearances for the club.

Following their relegation, Fox continued to remain as a first team regular at Burnley and went on to provide seven assists during the 2010–11 season. However, his 35 appearances for the club was restricted, due to suspension and injury. Fox made his only appearance of the 2011–12 season, playing in the opening game of the season, in a 2–2 draw against Watford.

=== Southampton ===
On 11 August 2011, Fox signed for Southampton on a four-year deal for an undisclosed fee. It was later revealed Fox's move to Southampton was Burnley's board of directors decision to sell him, citing an offer "could not refuse".

On 16 August 2011, he made his debut coming off from the bench replacing David Connolly in a 5–2 away win over Ipswich Town. Fox then provided a hat–trick assists, in a 4–0 win over Derby County on 18 February 2012. At Southampton, Fox began to established himself in the first team, playing in the left back position and helped the team gain promotion to the Premier League.

In the 2012–13 season, Fox continued to be in the first team regular and scored his first goal for the club in a 6–1 defeat at Arsenal on 15 September 2012. However, Fox's own injury concern and his sending off against West Brom on 27 April 2013, which saw him served them a three–match ban, restricted him to twenty appearances in the 2012–13 season.

Fox made his first appearance of the 2013–14 season, playing in the left–back position, in a 5–1 win over Barnsley in the second round of League Cup. However, Fox found himself competing over a left–back position with Luke Shaw. Fox found himself in the sidelined when he suffered a hamstring injury that kept him out for weeks. Fox made his return to the first team on 22 December 2013, where he set up one of the goals, in a 3–2 loss against Tottenham Hotspur.

=== Nottingham Forest ===
On 30 January 2014, Fox signed on loan for Championship side Nottingham Forest until the end of the 2013–14 season.

Fox made his Nottingham Forest debut on 2 February 2014, where he played 62 minutes before being substituted, in a 3–1 win over Yeovil Town. After making his debut, Fox expressed delight to make his Nottingham Forest debut, though he stated the game was tough. A week later on 11 February 2014 against Huddersfield Town, Fox provided an assist for Jamie Paterson, who scored twice, in a 3–0 win. However, personal reasons and an injury, which he sustained in a match against Birmingham City on 19 April 2014, restricted him to 14 appearances.

On 9 May, Nottingham Forest signed Danny Fox on a three-year deal. Ahead of the 2014–15 season, Fox continued to wear number 13 shirt, as he previously did whilst on loan. Fox captained Nottingham Forest for the first time in the first round of Football League Cup and played 90 minutes, in a 1–0 win over Tranmere Rovers. However, Fox's performance later came in for criticism from Nottingham Forest supporters in a 1–0 loss against Rochdale that saw Nottingham Forest eliminated from the FA Cup. After missing three matches because of this, Fox's return saw an improvement when he set up a goal, in a 3–0 win over Wigan Athletic and in the next game, in a 4–4 against Blackpool. Fox then provided three assists in two matches, which he provided twice against Reading and once against Charlton Athletic. Despite his own injury concern and losing his first team place to Michael Mancienne in the left-back position, Fox made 27 appearances in his first full season at Nottingham Forest.

In the 2015–16 season saw Fox continued to compete with Mancienne over the left-back position, remaining in the first team plans of new manager Dougie Freedman . Fox made his first start of the 2015–16 season, playing as a left-back, in the opening game of the season, in a 1–0 loss against Brighton & Hove Albion. However, Fox's first team place was soon lost and he was demoted to the substitutes bench. After almost two months since being in the first team, Fox made his return, where he played in a right-back position for 90 minutes, in a 2–0 loss against Bristol City. Fox was told by Freedman that he would no longer be part of his first team plan and he was allowed to leave the club, but this never happened and stayed at Nottingham Forest. While on the sidelines from the first team, Fox trained in the club's reserves. After five months absence from the first team, Fox was recalled to the first team by newly caretaker Manager Paul Williams in March and made his first appearance in five months, in a 2–1 loss against Reading on 5 April 2016. Fox remained in the first team for the last seven games, as the season progressed until he received a straight red card, in the last game of the season, in a 2–1 win over already relegated side MK Dons. Fox later finished the 2015–16 season, making ten appearances.

Ahead of the 2016–17 season, Fox signed a one-year contract extension with the club on 25 July 2016. Because of his red card against MK Dons in the last game of the season, Fox had to serve a three match ban. Fox made his return from suspension from the first team, where he made his first start and played 90 minutes, in a 1–0 loss against Brentford on 16 August 2016.

=== Wigan Athletic ===
On 29 January 2019, Fox joined Championship team Wigan Athletic for an undisclosed fee, reported to be around £300,000.

On 11 September 2020 he came back to Wigan Athletic with a short-term deal.

=== East Bengal Club ===
On 19 October 2020 Fox signed with East Bengal, managed by Robbie Fowler ahead of the 2020–21 Indian Super League season.

Following his release from East Bengal, Fox retired from football.

=== Winsford Town ===
In July 2023, Fox came out of retirement and signed for Winsford Town.

== International career ==
Fox, alongside Dann, was called up to the England under-21 squad for the match against Poland on 25 March 2008 and was selected in the starting 11. Fox and Dann were once again called–up for the England U21 squad in May 2008, but did not play, due to injury. In early 2009, Fox was called–up by England U21 for the third running, but did not play, due to the similar circumstances he had before.

He declared himself available to play for Scotland through his grandfather. Fox was selected for Scotland's friendly against Japan in October 2009, but had to withdraw due to an injury sustained while playing for Celtic. Fox finally made his debut for Scotland in a 3–0 defeat to Wales in November 2009. He did not feature for Scotland again until August 2012, when he was recalled by Craig Levein for a friendly against Australia. He played 69 minutes and was involved in two goals scored by Scotland in a 3–1 victory. He also played in Scotland's loss against Wales on 12 October 2012 at left back.

== Personal life ==
Outside of football, Fox likes to relax by watching films, with comedies and thrillers are his film genre preference. His parents resided in Cheshire and has a younger brother, who is in the RAF, and a sister.

In December 2014, Fox dyed his beard yellow in effort to raise money for charity called Cystic Fibrosis Foundation following his friend's death, who suffered from Cystic Fibrosis. Because of this, Fox was appointed as the ambassadorial role for the Cystic Fibrosis charity.

== Career statistics ==
As of 18 January 2021

Club	Season	League			FA Cup		League Cup		Other (Note: Includes other competitive competitions, including the Football League Trophy)		Total	
Club	Season	Division	Apps	Goals	Apps	Goals	Apps	Goals	Apps	Goals	Apps	Goals
Everton	2004–05	Premier League	0	0	0	0	0	0	—		0	0
Stranraer (loan)	2004–05	Scottish Second Division	11	1	0	0	0	0	0	0	11	1
Walsall	2005–06	League One	33	0	5	0	1	0	2 (Note: Appearance(s) in Football League Trophy)	0	41	0
Walsall	2006–07	League Two	44	3	2	0	2	0	1	0	49	3
Walsall	2007–08	League One	22	3	4	0	1	0	1	0	28	3
Walsall	Total		99	6	11	0	4	0	4	0	118	6
Coventry City	2007–08	Championship	18	1	0	0	0	0	—		18	1
Coventry City	2008–09	Championship	39	5	4	0	2	0	—		45	5
Coventry City	Total		57	6	4	0	2	0	—		63	6
Celtic	2009–10	Scottish Premier League	15	0	0	0	1	0	7 (Note: 3 appearances in UEFA Champions League, 4 appearances in UEFA Europa League)	0	23	0
Burnley	2009–10	Premier League	14	1	0	0	0	0	—		14	1
Burnley	2010–11	Championship	35	0	4	0	2	0	—		40	0
Burnley	2011–12	Championship	1	0	0	0	1	0	—		2	0
Burnley	Total		50	1	3	0	3	0	—		56	1
Southampton	2011–12	Championship	41	0	2	0	0	0	—		43	0
Southampton	2012–13	Premier League	20	1	0	0	0	0	—		20	1
Southampton	2013–14	Premier League	3	0	0	0	3	0	—		6	0
Southampton	Total		64	1	2	0	3	0	—		69	1
Nottingham Forest (loan)	2013–14	Championship	14	0	1	0	0	0	—		15	0
Nottingham Forest	2014–15	Championship	27	0	1	0	2	0	—		30	0
Nottingham Forest	2015–16	Championship	10	0	0	0	1	0	—		11	0
Nottingham Forest	2016–17	Championship	23	0	0	0	0	0	—		23	0
Nottingham Forest	2017–18	Championship	19	0	1	0	3	0	—		23	0
Nottingham Forest	2018–19	Championship	18	0	1	0	2	0	—		21	0
Nottingham Forest	Total		111	0	4	0	8	0	—		123	0
Wigan Athletic	2018–19	Championship	10	0	0	0	0	0	—		10	0
Wigan Athletic	2019–20	Championship	11	0	0	0	0	0	—		11	0
Wigan Athletic	2020–21	League One	2	0	0	0	0	0	—		2	0
Wigan Athletic	Total		23	0	0	0	0	0	—		23	0
East Bengal	2020–21	Indian Super League	16	1	—		—		—		16	1
Career total			446	16	24	0	19	0	13	0	502	16

== Honours ==
Stranraer

- Scottish Second Division promotion: 2004–05

Walsall

- Football League Two: 2006–07

Southampton

- Football League Championship second-place promotion: 2011–12

Individual

- Stranraer Young Player of the Year: 2003–04
- Coventry City Players' Player of the Year: 2008–09
- PFA Team of the Year: 2008–09 Football League Championship
- Nottingham Forest Supporters' Player of the Year: 2017–18

== See also ==
- List of Scotland international footballers born outside Scotland
- List of sportspeople who competed for more than one nation
