= Ben Farrell =

American concert promoter (1946–2022)

- Born: July 17, 1946; Jackson, Tennessee, U.S.
- Died: August 10, 2022 (aged 76)
- Education: Lipscomb University
- Occupation: Promoter
- Years active: 52
- Organization: Varnell Enterprises
- Known for: Promotion of Garth Brooks
- Spouse: Autumn
- Children: 1
- Parent: Kerby Farrell

Ben Farrell (July 17, 1946 – August 10, 2022) was an American concert promoter who was best known for promoting Garth Brooks.

== Early life ==
Farrell was born in Jackson, Tennessee. His father was American professional baseball player, coach, and manager Kerby Farrell. After attending Lipscomb University, the younger Farrell was drafted by the Philadelphia Phillies and played for the farm clubs of the Houston Astros and the Chicago White Sox. The US Army drafted Farrell in 1968, and he served two years.

== Music career ==
Farrell worked with Lon Varnell of Varnell Enterprises from 1970. He assisted with concert promotions, marketing, and supervision of events for acts such as Elvis and Elton John. Farrell started working with Garth Brooks in 1989.

Farrell was nominated for Promoter of the Year several times by the Academy of Country Music Awards; and was inducted into the International Entertainment Buyers Association's Hall of Fame in 2016 after having booked or promoted more than 5,000 concerts.

== Death ==
Farrell died August 10, 2022.
