= Elliott Ward =

English footballer (born 1985)

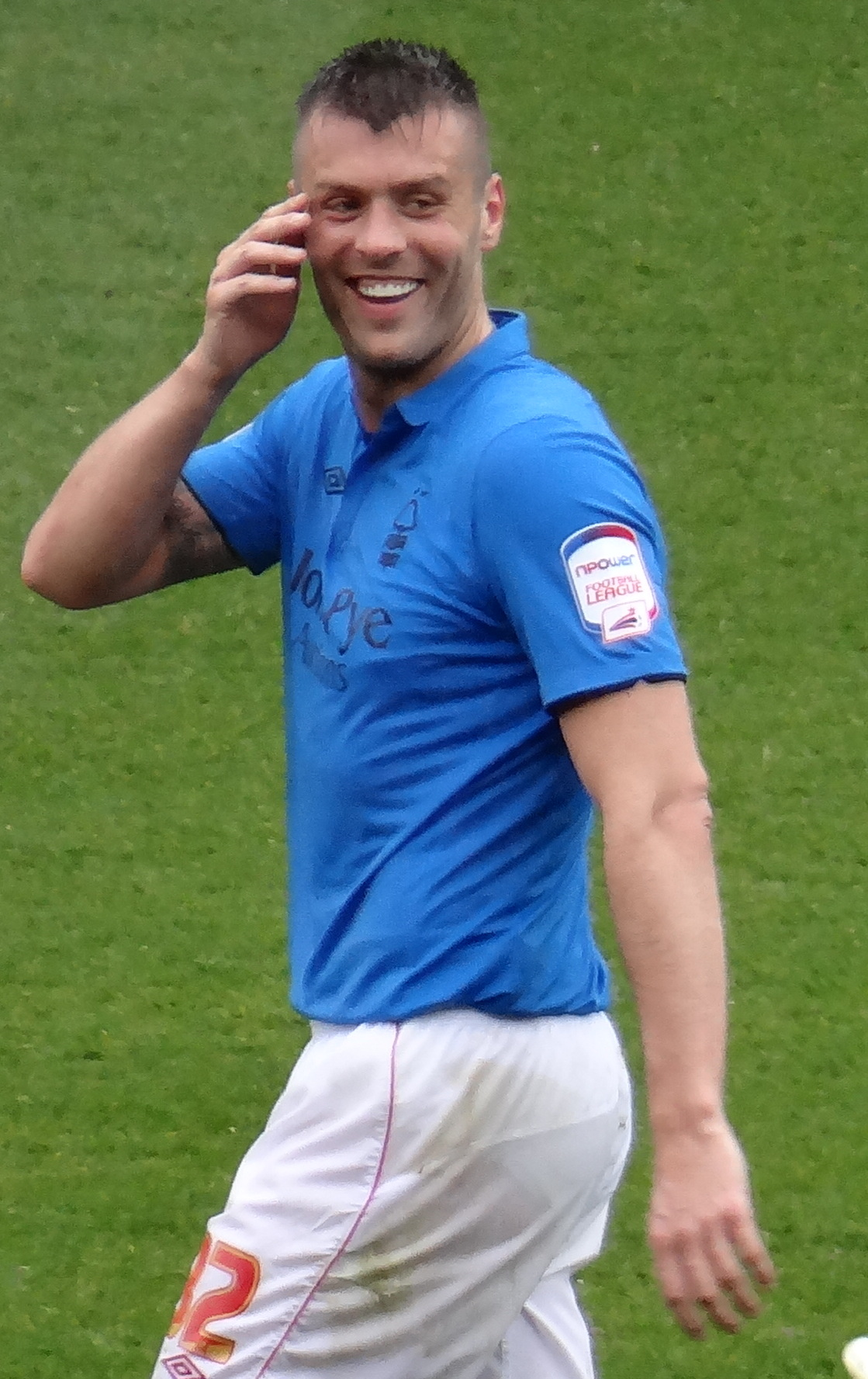
- Ward with Nottingham Forest in 2013

Personal information
- Full name: Elliott Leslie Ward
- Date of birth: 19 January 1985 (age 41)
- Place of birth: Harrow, England
- Height: 6 ft 1 in (1.85 m)
- Position: Defender

Youth career
- 2001–2003: West Ham United

Senior career*
Years	Team	Apps	(Gls)
2003–2006	West Ham United	15	(0)
2004	→ Peterborough United (loan)	0	(0)
2004–2005	→ Bristol Rovers (loan)	3	(0)
2005–2006	→ Plymouth Argyle (loan)	16	(1)
2006–2010	Coventry City	116	(14)
2010	→ Doncaster Rovers (loan)	6	(1)
2010	→ Preston North End (loan)	4	(0)
2010–2013	Norwich City	51	(1)
2012–2013	→ Nottingham Forest (loan)	12	(0)
2013	→ Nottingham Forest (loan)	19	(3)
2013–2016	AFC Bournemouth	25	(0)
2015	→ Huddersfield Town (loan)	5	(0)
2016–2018	Blackburn Rovers	23	(1)
2018	→ Milton Keynes Dons (loan)	15	(0)
2018–2019	Notts County	17	(1)
2019–2020	Cambridge United	13	(0)
2020–2021	Chelmsford City	17	(0)
Total		359	(22)
- * Club domestic league appearances and goals

Elliott Leslie Ward (born 19 January 1985) is an English retired professional footballer who played as a defender. He played in the Premier League for West Ham United and Norwich City. He is currently head coach of Colchester United's under-18s team.

== Playing career ==
=== West Ham United ===
Ward was born in Harrow, Greater London, and came through the youth system of West Ham United, making his debut for the Under-17 side before joining the first team in August 2003. In 2004, Ward went out for two loan spells, at Peterborough United and Bristol Rovers in July and December 2004 respectively.

Ward made an impact on the West Ham first team during the second half of the 2004–05 season, while the club were in the Football League Championship. Primarily due to injuries to more established defenders such as Christian Dailly and Malky Mackay, he found himself with the opportunity of partnering Anton Ferdinand in the centre of defence.

When Ward was brought into the first team, for the 1–3 loss against Reading on 12 March 2005, the club were lying outside the playoff places and looked unlikely to make it back to the Premiership. The pairing of Ward and Ferdinand enabled the team to remain unbeaten for the rest of the season. This unbeaten run included the three play-off games, thus ensuring their return to the Premiership for the following season.

At the beginning of the 2005–06 season, to prepare for the upcoming Premiership campaign, West Ham signed a number of players, including central defenders Danny Gabbidon and James Collins from Cardiff City. Gabbidon became the preferred choice to partner Ferdinand, and this resulted in chances being few and far between for Ward. He played two League Cup games, but made only one substitute Premiership appearance (against Bolton Wanderers on 27 August 2005) before being loaned out to Plymouth Argyle in November, initially on a month-long loan. The month-by-month loan deal lasted three months, and after playing 16 games and scoring once against Wolves, Ward returned to The Hammers in February 2006 playing three further games towards the end of the 2005–06 season.

=== Coventry City ===
Ward left West Ham in the summer of 2006, joining Coventry City for £1 million. Manager Micky Adams said of him: "In Elliott we have a young, talented and confident defender who I'm sure will bring a real presence to our back line. He is just the sort of player we are looking for to help the club progress."

Ward made his debut for Coventry on 6 August 2006 in a 2–1 home win against Sunderland with his first goal coming on 12 September 2006 in a 2–1 away defeat to Ipswich Town. The next three seasons saw him play 39, 37 and 32 league games for Coventry scoring 14 league goals but by season 2009–10 he was reduced to only eight games for the season. Having fallen down the pecking order at Coventry, in February 2010 he joined Doncaster Rovers on a one-month emergency loan after Rovers suffered injuries to several first team defenders. He made an instant impact at Doncaster, scoring an overhead kick goal on his debut against Sheffield Wednesday at Hillsborough. He played only six league games for Doncaster before being signed by Preston North End manager Darren Ferguson, on loan until the end of the season, in March 2010. He made only four league appearances for Preston before returning to Coventry City.

=== Norwich City ===
On 26 May 2010, Ward signed a two-year deal with Norwich City on a free transfer. His Norwich debut came on 6 August in the opening game of the 2010–11 season, a 2–3 home defeat to Watford. Ward picked up an injury in the 2–1 away win over Coventry City on 18 December, sidelining him until the end of January. He made his return to the team in the 2–1 win over Millwall on 1 February 2011, scoring his first goal for the club to equalise.

Ward played 39 of a possible 46 league games in Norwich City's side which won promotion to the Premier League in 2010–11 season but in July 2011, during a pre-season tour of Germany, Ward picked up a knee injury which kept him out of action until January 2012.

In October 2012 Ward joined Nottingham Forest on loan until 29 December 2012, with a view to a permanent transfer. Ward returned to Norwich at the end of his loan spell and was named as a substitute for their FA Cup game away at Peterborough United. However, in January 2013, after just over a week with Norwich, he returned on loan with Nottingham Forest. His first Forest goal came in his first game of his second loan spell, on 12 January 2013. His headed goal in the 83rd minute from a Radosław Majewski cross saw Forest 2–1 winners against Peterborough United giving manager Alex McLeish his first win as Forest manager.

=== AFC Bournemouth ===
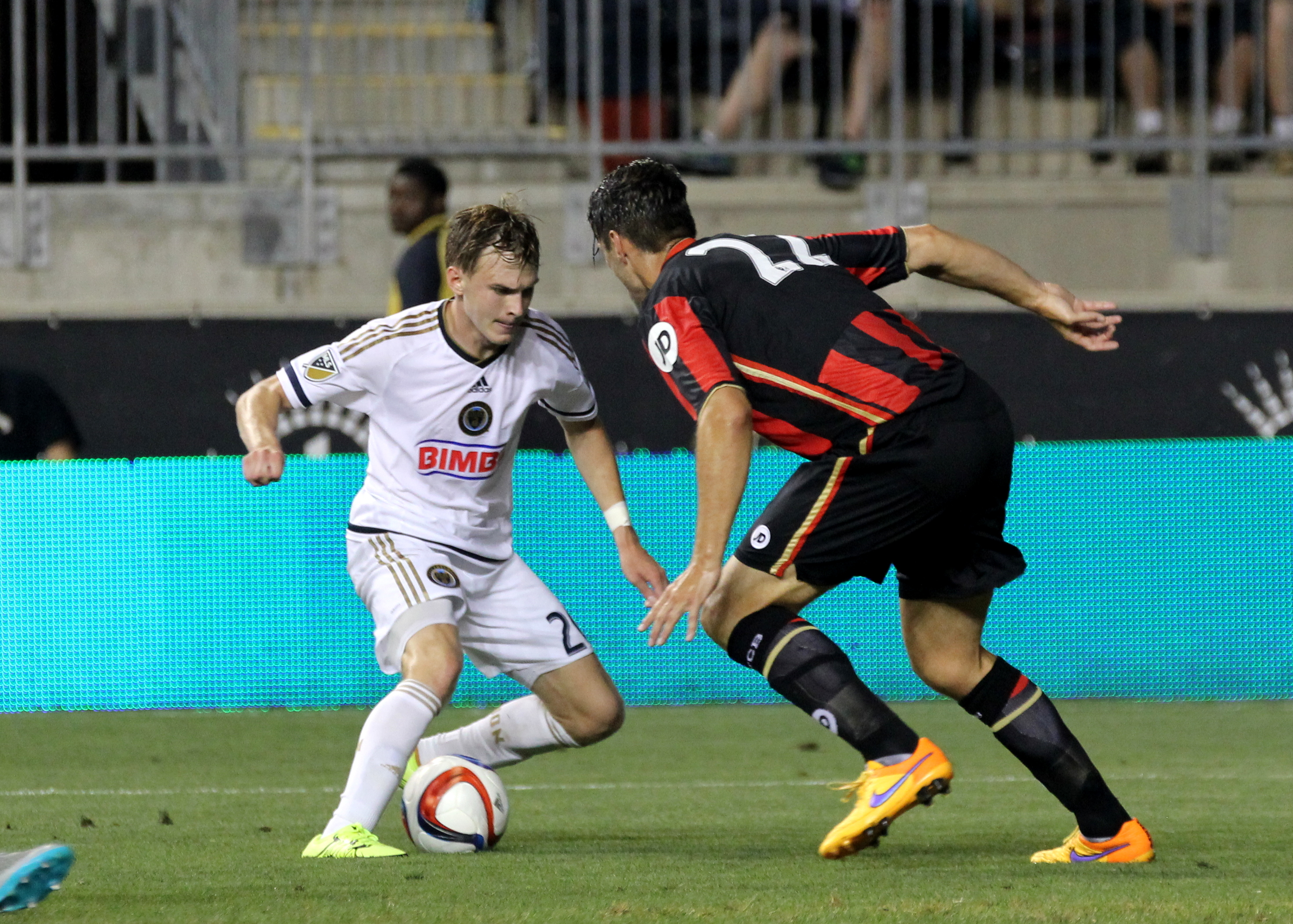
Ward defending against Philadelphia Union midfielder Jimmy McLaughlin in a 2015 international friendly

On 18 June 2013 Ward signed an initial one-year deal with AFC Bournemouth following their promotion to the Championship. He made two league appearances during Bournemouth's 2014–15 season after which they were promoted to the Premier League. His contract with Bournemouth was cancelled in January 2016 by mutual consent.

=== Huddersfield Town (loan) ===
On 9 September 2015, Ward signed on loan for Championship club Huddersfield Town for an initial period of a month. He made his Town début in the 2–0 loss against Cardiff City on 12 September. He played five games, before returning to Bournemouth, due to a knee injury. Following recovery from the injury, Ward rejoined the Terriers on 7 December for a second loan spell until 28 December. However, he returned to the South Coast on the conclusion of this loan without being included in a match-day squad in his second spell.

=== Blackburn Rovers ===
On 20 January 2016, Ward signed with Blackburn Rovers on a two-and-a-half-year deal. Ward appeared seven times for Blackburn in his first season, scoring once.

At the very end of the 2018 January transfer window, Ward was loaned out to Milton Keynes Dons, before being released by Blackburn at the end of the 2017–18 season.

=== Notts County ===
On 3 September 2018, Ward joined Notts County. The length of contract was not disclosed.

He was released by Notts County at the end of the 2018–19 season.

=== Cambridge United ===
In September 2019, Ward joined Cambridge United on a contract lasting until January 2020.

=== Chelmsford City ===
On 17 February 2020, Ward signed for Chelmsford City, making his debut on the same evening in a 3–1 win against Tonbridge Angels.

On 21 June 2021, Chelmsford announced Ward's retirement from football.

== Coaching career ==
Following his retirement, Ward remained at Chelmsford as their academy assistant manager. In March 2022, Ward returned to West Ham as an under-14's coach.

== Personal life ==
He is the brother of Scott Ward and Hemel Hempstead Town defender Darren Ward, who turned down the opportunity of joining West Ham and the Premiership, at the start of the 2005–06 season, instead opting for Championship side Crystal Palace, claiming he did not want to keep his brother out of the team.

== Career statistics ==
As of match played 22 April 2019

Appearances and goals by club, season and competition
Club	Season	League			FA Cup		League Cup		Other		Total	
Club	Season	Division	Apps	Goals	Apps	Goals	Apps	Goals	Apps	Goals	Apps	Goals
West Ham United	2004–05	Championship	11	0	0	0	1	0	3 (Note: Appearances in the Championship play-offs)	0	15	0
West Ham United	2005–06	Premier League	4	0	0	0	2	0	0	0	6	0
West Ham United	Total		15	0	0	0	3	0	3	0	21	0
Bristol Rovers (loan)	2004–05	League Two	3	0	0	0	0	0	0	0	3	0
Plymouth Argyle (loan)	2005–06	Championship	16	1	0	0	0	0	0	0	16	1
Coventry City	2006–07	Championship	39	3	0	0	1	0	0	0	40	1
Coventry City	2007–08	Championship	36	6	3	1	2	0	0	0	41	7
Coventry City	2008–09	Championship	33	5	3	1	1	0	0	0	37	6
Coventry City	2009–10	Championship	8	0	0	0	0	0	0	0	8	0
Coventry City	Total		116	14	6	2	4	0	0	0	126	16
Doncaster Rovers (loan)	2009–10	Championship	7	1	0	0	0	0	0	0	7	1
Preston North End (loan)	2009–10	Championship	4	0	0	0	0	0	0	0	4	0
Norwich City	2010–11	Championship	39	1	0	0	2	0	0	0	41	1
Norwich City	2011–12	Premier League	12	0	1	0	0	0	0	0	13	0
Norwich City	2012–13	Premier League	0	0	0	0	1	0	0	0	1	0
Norwich City	Total		51	1	1	0	3	0	0	0	55	2
Nottingham Forest (loan)	2012–13	Championship	31	3	0	0	0	0	0	0	31	3
AFC Bournemouth	2013–14	Championship	23	0	1	0	1	0	0	0	25	0
AFC Bournemouth	2014–15	Championship	2	0	0	0	1	0	0	0	3	0
AFC Bournemouth	Total		25	0	1	0	2	0	0	0	28	0
Huddersfield Town (loan)	2015–16	Championship	5	0	0	0	0	0	0	0	5	0
Blackburn Rovers	2015–16	Championship	7	1	2	0	0	0	0	0	9	1
Blackburn Rovers	2016–17	Championship	6	0	0	0	0	0	0	0	6	0
Blackburn Rovers	2017–18	League One	10	0	2	0	2	0	1	0	15	0
Blackburn Rovers	Total		23	1	4	0	2	0	1	0	30	1
Milton Keynes Dons (loan)	2017–18	League One	15	0	—		—		—		15	0
Notts County	2018–19	League Two	17	1	1	0	0	0	1	0	19	1
Career total			328	22	13	2	14	0	5	0	360	24

== Honours ==
West Ham United

- Football League Championship play-offs: 2005
