= Donovan Simmonds =

English footballer (born 1988)

Personal information
- Full name: Donovan Ashton Simmonds
- Date of birth: 12 October 1988 (age 38)
- Place of birth: Walthamstow, England
- Height: 6 ft 0 in (1.83 m)
- Position: Striker

Youth career
- 2004–2007: Charlton Athletic

Senior career*
Years	Team	Apps	(Gls)
2007–2009	Coventry City	0	(0)
2008	→ Gillingham (loan)	3	(0)
2008–2009	→ Kilmarnock (loan)	19	(1)
2009	Floriana	7	(1)
2010	Greenock Morton	14	(1)
2010	Rushden & Diamonds	2	(0)
2010	Nuneaton Town	10	(9)
2010–2012	Dover Athletic	31	(7)
2012–2013	Chelmsford City	26	(3)
2013	Boreham Wood	8	(3)
2013–2014	Tilbury	10	(0)
2014	Tamworth	6	(1)
2014–2015	Bishop's Stortford	13	(0)
2015–2017	VCD Athletic	?	(?)
2017	Kingstonian	2	(0)
- * Club domestic league appearances and goals as of 04:40, 7 January 2018 (UTC)

Donovan Ashton Simmonds (born 12 October 1988 in Walthamstow) is an English footballer who last played for Kingstonian. He plays as a striker.

Simmonds began his youth career with London side Charlton Athletic, before moving to Coventry City where he failed to make any appearances. He spent two spells on loan with Gillingham and in the Scottish Premier League with Kilmarnock, before being released in 2009.

He spent a short spell with Maltese club Floriana, before returning to the United Kingdom to sign for Greenock Morton in the Scottish Football League First Division. Simmonds signed for Conference North club Nuneaton Town in September 2010, and for Dover Athletic two months later. He later signed for Chelmsford City in September 2012.

== Playing career ==
=== Coventry City ===
Simmonds joined Coventry City on a free transfer, signing a two-year deal following his release from the Charlton Athletic academy at the end of the 2006–07 season.

Simmonds had impressed while on trial, playing in two friendly matches and a testimonial match against Nuneaton Borough, in which he netted in a 5–0 win. He was one of a number of Coventry signings to have previously worked with manager Iain Dowie during their brief time together at Charlton.

=== Gillingham ===
On 28 March 2008, it was announced that Simmonds had joined Gillingham on loan until the end of the season, where he was given the number 2 (a number usually associated with right-backs). Simmonds made his Gills debut in a 2–1 home win against Luton Town on 1 April.

=== Kilmarnock ===
On 13 August 2008 Simmonds joined Kilmarnock on a loan deal set to last until 5 January 2009. Simmonds scored his debut Killie goal with a late header against Falkirk after coming on as a sub. In December, Kilmarnock announced that his loan deal had been extended until the end of the season.

=== Floriana ===
On 19 August 2009, it was confirmed that Simmonds had joined Maltese Premier League side Floriana, following his release from Coventry.

Simmonds scored his first goal since joining the Greens in the 1–0 win over Hamrun Spartans on 4 October 2009.

After leaving Floriana, Simmonds trained with Greenock Morton, playing two trial matches to try to win a deal.

=== Greenock Morton ===
Simmonds signed for Scottish First Division side Morton on 27 February 2010, until the end of the season.

He was released by Morton at the end of the 2009–10 season.

=== Rushden & Diamonds ===
Simmonds signed a contract with Rushden & Diamonds on 6 August 2010.

=== Nuneaton Town ===
He then signed for Conference North outfit Nuneaton Town on 20 September 2010 and played his debut less than 24 hours later in Nuneaton's 3–0 defeat of Harrogate Town.

=== Dover Athletic ===
Simmonds returned to Kent for his third club in less than half a season, joining Dover Athletic in December 2010 and scoring on his début against Maidenhead United.

He was released in May 2012 by the club.

=== Chelmsford City ===
Simmonds signed for Conference South club Chelmsford in September 2012. He scored two goals and made an assist in an FA Cup 1st round tie with local rivals Colchester United, which Chelmsford won 3–1.

=== Tilbury ===
In November 2013, Simmonds signed for Isthmian League club, Tilbury and featured regularly in their starting lineup, before leaving the club at the end of the season.

=== Tamworth ===
On 2 August 2014, Donovan joined Conference North side Tamworth following a successful trial period, and was joined on the same day by Brendon Daniels and George Grayson.

=== Bishop's Stortford ===
Simmonds joined Bishop's Stortford in October 2014.
