= Danny Ireland =

Australian soccer player

Personal information
- Full name: Daniel Anthony Ireland
- Date of birth: 30 September 1990 (age 36)
- Place of birth: Sydney, Australia
- Height: 6 ft 4 in (1.93 m)
- Position: Goalkeeper

Senior career*
Years	Team	Apps	(Gls)
2008–2012	Coventry City	1	(0)
2008	→ Nuneaton Town (loan)	2	(0)
2008–2009	→ Halesowen Town (loan)	3	(0)
2010	→ Forest Green Rovers (loan)	11	(0)
2012–2014	Lambton Jaffas	38	(0)
2015–2017	Hamilton Olympic	41	(0)
2018	Charlestown City Blues	12	(0)
2020–	Valentine Phoenix	8	(0)

International career^{‡}
2008–2009	Australia U20	1	(0)
- * Club domestic league appearances and goals as of 2 December 2020 ‡ National team caps and goals as of 20:16, 5 March 2011 (UTC)

Daniel Anthony Ireland (born 30 September 1990) is an Australian football player. He is a goalkeeper who is currently playing with NPL NNSW club, Hamilton Olympic FC.

== Career ==
=== Coventry City ===
He made his professional debut on 13 August 2008 in a 3–1 League Cup win against Aldershot.

==== Nuneaton Town (loan) ====
He joined Nuneaton Town on 3 October for a month's loan, but his loan spell was cut short after playing in two games for the club after he was called up for the Australia U-20 side.

==== Halesowen Town (loan) ====
In December 2008 he joined Halesowen Town on a one-month loan deal, making three appearances before returning to Coventry. He made his first league appearance on 5 March 2011 against Bristol City as a half time replacement for the injured Keiren Westwood. Ireland was released by Coventry City when his contract ran out at the end of the 2011/2012 season.

==== Forest Green Rovers (loan) ====
In February 2010 Ireland joined Forest Green Rovers on one-month's loan. Ireland impressed in his first month at The New Lawn and the deal was extended until the end of the season.

=== Lambton Jaffas ===
Following his release from Coventry, Ireland returned home to Australia and joined Lambton Jaffas FC, who had recently been promoted to the Northern New South Wales State Football League for the 2013 season. Lambton finished as Runners Up by losing to Broadmeadow Magic in the Grand Final.
2014 saw Ireland win the inaugural NPL Northern NSW Championship title with Lambton by defeating Weston Workers in the Grand Final.

=== Hamilton Olympic ===
For 2015, Ireland has signed with Hamilton Olympic. By signing Ireland, Newcastle Jets Youth goalkeeper, Jesse Cook, has ended his deal with Hamilton. 2015 sees a goalkeeper swap when former Hamilton goalkeeper Brad Swancott plays for Lambton and Ireland plays for Hamilton. Ireland has returned from trialling with Sydney-based NPL NSW clubs after having secured a job in fund management in Newcastle. When asked about Ireland, Hamilton coach Michael Bolch said, "Danny has been the best keeper in the competition by a mile for the last two seasons. It’s a hard decision, but it’s a specialist position and we decided we would rather sign the best keeper in the competition than play against him."
