= Guillaume Beuzelin =

French footballer (born 1979)

Personal information
- Full name: Guillaume Pierre Beuzelin
- Date of birth: 14 April 1979 (age 47)
- Place of birth: Le Havre, France
- Position: Midfielder

Team information
- Current team: Hibernian (Academy coach)

Senior career*
Years	Team	Apps	(Gls)
1999–2004	Le Havre	93	(8)
2001–2002	→ AS Beauvais (loan)	35	(3)
2004–2008	Hibernian	99	(10)
2008–2009	Coventry City	35	(1)
2009	Hamilton Academical	4	(0)
2010	Olympiakos Nicosia		
- * Club domestic league appearances and goals

Guillaume Pierre Beuzelin (born 14 April 1979) is a French professional football coach and former player. He played in France for Le Havre and AS Beauvais, in Scotland for Hibernian and Hamilton Academical, in England for Coventry City and in Cyprus for Olympiakos Nicosia.

== Playing career ==
=== Hibernian ===
Beuzelin joined Hibernian in 2004, having been released by his previous club Le Havre. He quickly became a favourite of the Hibs fans. He was part of the team who won the 2007 Scottish League Cup final. Following an impressive couple of season in the SPL, Beuzelin drew attention from a number of English clubs in the Championship. Chief amongst them were Tony Mowbray's West Brom team, Mowbray having previously worked with the Frenchman at Hibs. However West Brom's promotion to the Premier League in 2007-08 meant that their interest waned, as Beuzelin's contract reached its expiry date, leaving room open for other Championship sides to sign him on a free.

=== Coventry City ===
Beuzelin signed for Coventry after his contract with Hibs expired at the end of the 2007–08 season. He signed a one-year deal, with a club option for a further year. Beuzelin arrived with a big reputation following his impressive spell in Scottish football but failed to live up to expectations, and becoming the subject of vocal criticism from the club's fans. He ended up making 35 league appearances and scoring once against Blackpool during the 2008–09 season. However his level of performance was disappointing as the first year of his contract drew to a close. During the summer of 2009 Coventry and Beuzelin reached an impasse in their contract negotiations and the Frenchman left the club during the close season.

=== Hamilton Academical ===
After leaving Coventry, Beuzelin started training with Celtic, and he played in a friendly match against Cork City. After a trial with MK Dons, Beuzelin started training with Hamilton, and signed for the club on 29 September.

=== Olympiakos Nicosia ===
After being released by Hamilton at the end of 2009, he signed in early January for Cypriot team Olympiakos Nicosia. Beuzelin was released at the end of the 2009–10 season.

Beuzelin then began training with SPL side Kilmarnock, who were managed by Mixu Paatelainen, who had previously worked with Beuzelin at Hibs. Beuzelin agreed a one-year contract with Kilmarnock, but he failed a medical to complete the transfer.

== Coaching career ==
A succession of injuries forced Beuzelin to formally retire from playing football in 2011. As of 2011, he was employed by Falkirk as a coach in their youth academy system. In January 2012, Beuzelin was appointed to a role with the University of Stirling as the institution's 2nd team head coach.

Hibernian appointed Beuzelin to coach their under-14 team in September 2012. He also worked for the Scottish Football Association. In July 2014, Beuzelin was appointed assistant manager of Dumbarton.

He moved to Hamilton Academical in January 2015 as assistant to new manager Martin Canning. Beuzelin was caretaker manager in January 2019 after Canning left the club and until Brian Rice was appointed head coach later that week. He was appointed interim manager again, alongside George Cairns, in 2021 following the departure of Brian Rice.
