= 2006–07 Coventry City F.C. season =

Coventry City
2006–07 season
- Manager: Micky Adams; Adrian Heath (caretaker); Iain Dowie
- Stadium: Ricoh Arena
- Championship: 17th
- FA Cup: Third Round
- League Cup: First Round
- Top goalscorer: League: Dele Adebola (8); All: Dele Adebola (9)
Home colours	Away colours

The 2006–07 season was Coventry City's 87th season in the Football League and their 6th consecutive season in the Football League Championship. Along with competing in the Championship, the club also participated in the FA Cup and Football League Cup. The season covers the period from 1 July 2006 to 30 June 2007.

== Matches ==
=== Pre-season friendlies ===
8 July 2006	Portland Timbers	1–1 (4–3 p)	Coventry City	PGE Park, Portland, Oregon

12 July 2006	BYU Cougars	0–3	Coventry City	South Field, Provo, Utah

21 July 2006	Nuneaton Borough	3–2	Coventry City	Liberty Way, Nuneaton

23 July 2006	Notts County	0–2	Coventry City	Meadow Lane, Nottingham

25 July 2006	Banbury United	1–2	Coventry City	Spencer Stadium, Banbury

27 July 2006	Tranmere Rovers	0–0	Coventry City	Prenton Park, Tranmere

29 July 2006	Coventry City	1–2	Boavista	Ricoh Arena, Coventry

=== Championship ===
6 August 2006	Coventry City	2–1	Sunderland	Ricoh Arena, Coventry

9 August 2006	Southampton	2–0	Coventry City	St Mary's Stadium, Southampton

12 August 2006	Cardiff City	1–0	Coventry City	Ninian Park, Cardiff

18 August 2006	Coventry City	0–0	Leicester City	Ricoh Arena, Coventry

26 August 2006	Hull City	0–1	Coventry City	KC Stadium, Hull

9 September 2006	Coventry City	3–0	Norwich City	Ricoh Arena, Coventry

12 September 2006	Ipswich Town	2–1	Coventry City	Portman Road, Ipswich

16 September 2006	Coventry City	1–0	Leeds United	Ricoh Arena, Coventry

23 September 2006	Crystal Palace	1–0	Coventry City	Selhurst Park, London

30 September 2006	Coventry City	0–1	Plymouth Argyle	Ricoh Arena, Coventry

13 October 2006	Southend United	2–3	Coventry City	Roots Hall, Southend

17 October 2006	Wolverhampton Wanderers	1–0	Coventry City	Molineux, Wolverhampton

23 October 2006	Coventry City	2–1	Colchester United	Ricoh Arena, Coventry

28 October 2006	Barnsley	0–1	Coventry City	Oakwell, Barnsley

31 October 2006	Coventry City	0–1	Birmingham City	Ricoh Arena, Coventry

6 November 2006	Stoke City	1–0	Coventry City	Britannia Stadium, Stoke-On-Trent

11 November 2006	Coventry City	1–2	Derby County	Ricoh Arena, Coventry

18 November 2006	Coventry City	3–1	Sheffield Wednesday	Ricoh Arena, Coventry

25 November 2006	Queens Park Rangers	0–1	Coventry City	Loftus Road, London

28 November 2006	Preston North End	1–1	Coventry City	Deepdale, Preston

2 December 2006	Coventry City	0–0	Stoke City	Ricoh Arena, Coventry

9 December 2006	Coventry City	1–0	Burnley	Ricoh Arena, Coventry

16 December 2006	West Bromwich Albion	5–0	Coventry City	The Hawthorns, West Bromwich

23 December 2006	Luton Town	3–1	Coventry City	Kenilworth Road, Luton

26 December 2006	Coventry City	1–2	Ipswich Town	Ricoh Arena, Coventry

30 December 2006	Coventry City	1–1	Southend United	Ricoh Arena, Coventry

1 January 2007	Leeds United	2–1	Coventry City	Elland Road, Leeds

13 January 2007	Coventry City	2–4	Crystal Palace	Ricoh Arena, Coventry

22 January 2007	Plymouth Argyle	3–2	Coventry City	Home Park, Plymouth

30 January 2007	Coventry City	1–0	Luton Town	Ricoh Arena, Coventry

3 February 2007	Sunderland	2–0	Coventry City	Stadium of Light, Sunderland

10 February 2007	Coventry City	2–2	Cardiff City	Ricoh Arena, Coventry

17 February 2007	Leicester City	3–0	Coventry City	Walkers Stadium, Leicester

20 February 2007	Coventry City	2–1	Southampton	Ricoh Arena, Coventry

24 February 2007	Norwich City	1–1	Coventry City	Carrow Road, Norwich

3 March 2007	Coventry City	2–0	Hull City	Ricoh Arena, Coventry

10 March 2007	Colchester United	0–0	Coventry City	Layer Road, Colchester

13 March 2007	Coventry City	2–1	Wolverhampton Wanderers	Ricoh Arena, Coventry

17 March 2007	Coventry City	4–1	Barnsley	Ricoh Arena, Coventry

1 April 2007	Birmingham City	3–0	Coventry City	St Andrew's, Birmingham

7 April 2007	Coventry City	0–1	Queens Park Rangers	Ricoh Arena, Coventry

9 April 2007	Derby County	1–1	Coventry City	Pride Park, Derby

14 April 2007	Coventry City	0–4	Preston North End	Ricoh Arena, Coventry

21 April 2007	Sheffield Wednesday	2–1	Coventry City	Hillsborough, Sheffield

28 April 2007	Coventry City	0–1	West Bromwich Albion	Ricoh Arena, Coventry

6 May 2007	Burnley	1–2	Coventry City	Turf Moor, Burnley

=== League Cup ===
22 August 2006	Hereford United	3–1	Coventry City	Edgar Street, Hereford

=== FA Cup ===
6 January 2007	Bristol City	3–3	Coventry City	Ashton Gate, Bristol

16 January 2007	Coventry City	0–2	Bristol City	Ricoh Arena, Coventry

== Season statistics ==
=== Starts and goals ===
No.	Pos	Nat	Player	Total		Championship		League Cup		FA Cup	
No.	Pos	Nat	Player	Apps	Goals	Apps	Goals	Apps	Goals	Apps	Goals
1	GK	(England) ENG	Luke Steele (on loan from West Bromwich Albion)	7	0	5+0	0	0+0	0	2+0	0
2	DF	(England) ENG	Andy Whing (on loan to Brighton & Hove Albion)	19	0	15+1	0	1+0	0	2+0	0
3	DF	(England) ENG	Marcus Hall	42	0	38+2	0	1+0	0	1+0	0
4	DF	(Wales) WAL	Rob Page	31	0	28+1	0	0+0	0	2+0	0
5	DF	(England) ENG	Elliott Ward	40	3	39+0	3	1+0	0	0+0	0
6	MF	(England) ENG	Stephen Hughes	38	1	36+1	1	1+0	0	0+0	0
6	MF	(England) ENG	Wayne Andrews (on loan to Sheffield Wednesday and Bristol City)	3	1	0+3	1	0+0	0	0+0	0
8	MF	(Republic of Ireland) IRL	Michael Doyle	42	3	40+0	3	0+0	0	2+0	0
9	FW	(Nigeria) NGA	Dele Adebola	42	9	28+12	8	1	1	1	0
10	FW	(England) ENG	Gary McSheffrey	3	1	3+0	1	0+0	0	0+0	0
10	FW	(Scotland) SCO	Kevin Kyle	33	3	18+13	3	0+0	0	2+0	0
11	MF	(Trinidad and Tobago) TRI	Chris Birchall	30	2	17+11	2	1+1	0	0+0	0
13	GK	(Spain) ESP	Rafael González-Robles	0	0	0+0	0	0+0	0	0+0	0
13	GK	(England) ENG	Arran Lee-Barrett (on loan from Weymouth)	0	0	0+0	0	0+0	0	0+0	0
14	FW	(Trinidad and Tobago) TRI	Stern John	25	6	19+4	5	1	0	1	1
14	MF	(Senegal) SEN	Khalilou Fadiga	6	0	1+5	0	0+0	0	0+0	0
15	MF	(Faroe Islands) FRO	Claus Bech Jørgensen	0	0	0+0	0	0+0	0	0+0	0
15	FW	(England) ENG	Leon McKenzie	33	8	23+8	7	0+0	0	2+0	1
16	MF	(England) ENG	Isaac Osbourne (on loan to Crewe Alexandra)	21	0	16+3	0	0+0	0	2+0	0
17	DF	(England) ENG	Matt Heath (on loan to Leeds United)	8	0	7+0	0	1+0	0	0+0	0
17	FW	(Malta) MLT	Michael Mifsud	19	4	12+7	4	0+0	0	0+0	0
18	DF	(Scotland) SCO	David McNamee	16	0	16+0	0	0+0	0	0+0	0
19	DF	(England) ENG	Stuart Giddings	1	0	0+1	0	0+0	0	0+0	0
20	DF	(Denmark) DEN	Mikkel Bischoff	3	0	2+1	0	0+0	0	0+0	0
20	DF	(Republic of Ireland) IRL	Colin Hawkins	13	0	13+0	0	0+0	0	0+0	0
21	MF	(Republic of Ireland) IRL	Jay Tabb	32	3	22+9	3	0+0	0	1+0	0
22	MF	(Scotland) SCO	Don Hutchison	14	0	3+11	0	0+0	0	0+0	0
23	MF	(Scotland) SCO	Colin Cameron	26	3	16+8	2	1+0	0	1+0	1
24	DF	(New Zealand) NZL	Che Bunce	0	0	0+0	0	0+0	0	0+0	0
25	DF	(Wales) WAL	Richard Duffy (on loan from Portsmouth)	13	0	13+0	0	0+0	0	0+0	0
25	MF	(England) ENG	Adam Virgo (on loan from Celtic)	16	1	10+5	1	0+0	0	1+0	0
26	MF	(Morocco) MAR	Faysal El Idrissi	2	0	0+1	0	1+0	0	0+0	0
26	DF	(Republic of Ireland) IRL	Clive Clarke (on loan from Sunderland)	12	0	12+0	0	0+0	0	0+0	0
26	MF	(England) ENG	Darren Currie (on loan from Ipswich Town)	8	0	6+2	0	0+0	0	0+0	0
29	MF	(Republic of Ireland) IRL	Kevin Thornton	11	1	5+6	1	0	0	0	0
30	MF	(England) ENG	Liam Davis (on loan to Peterborough United)	3	0	1+2	0	0+0	0	0+0	0
32	MF	(England) ENG	Andrew Gooding	0	0	0+0	0	0+0	0	0+0	0
33	GK	(England) ENG	Andy Marshall	42	0	41+0	0	1+0	0	0+0	0
34	DF	(England) ENG	Ben Turner (on loan to Peterborough United and Oldham Athletic)	3	0	1+0	0	0+0	0	2+0	0
35	MF	(England) ENG	Lee Hildreth	1	0	0+1	0	0+0	0	0+0	0

Notes:

- Player substitutions are not included.

=== Goalscorers ===
15 players scored for Coventry City during the 2006–07 season.

49 goals were scored in total during the 2006–07 season:

- 45 in the Championship
- 1 in the League Cup
- 3 in the FA Cup

The top goalscorer was Dele Adebola with 9 goals.

Name	Championship	League Cup	FA Cup	Total
Dele Adebola	8	1	0	9
Leon McKenzie	7	0	1	8
Stern John	5	0	1	6
Michael Mifsud	4	0	0	4
Michael Doyle	3	0	0	3
Kevin Kyle	3	0	0	3
Jay Tabb	3	0	0	3
Elliott Ward	3	0	0	3
Colin Cameron	2	0	1	3
Chris Birchall	2	0	0	2
Wayne Andrews	1	0	0	1
Stephen Hughes	1	0	0	1
Gary McSheffrey	1	0	0	1
Kevin Thornton	1	0	0	1
Adam Virgo	1	0	0	1

=== Discipline ===
==== Yellow cards ====
18 players were booked for Coventry City during the 2006–07 season.

87 bookings were received in total during the 2006–07 season:

- 81 in the Championship
- 2 in the League Cup
- 4 in the FA Cup

The most booked player was Kevin Kyle with 12 cards.

Name	Championship	League Cup	FA Cup	Total
Kevin Kyle	11	0	1	(yellow card) 12
Rob Page	10	0	0	(yellow card) 10
Michael Doyle	8	0	2	(yellow card) 10
Andy Whing	6	1	0	(yellow card) 7
David McNamee	6	0	0	(yellow card) 6
Marcus Hall	5	0	0	(yellow card) 5
Leon McKenzie	5	0	0	(yellow card) 5
Jay Tabb	5	0	0	(yellow card) 5
Elliott Ward	5	0	0	(yellow card) 5
Richard Duffy	4	0	0	(yellow card) 4
Stephen Hughes	3	1	0	(yellow card) 3
Dele Adebola	3	0	0	(yellow card) 3
Isaac Osbourne	3	0	0	(yellow card) 3
Kevin Thornton	3	0	0	(yellow card) 3
Adam Virgo	2	0	1	(yellow card) 3
Colin Cameron	1	0	0	(yellow card) 1
Colin Hawkins	1	0	0	(yellow card) 1
Stern John	1	0	0	(yellow card) 1

==== Red Cards ====
1 player was sent off for Coventry City during the 2006–07 season.

1 player was sent off in total during the 2006–07 season.

- 1 in the Championship
- The most sent off player was David McNamee with 1 sending off.

Name	Championship	League Cup	FA Cup	Total
David McNamee	1	0	0	(red card) 1

== Transfers ==
=== In ===
Player	From	Date	Fee
(Scotland) David McNamee	(Scotland) Livingston	2 June 2006	£100,000
(England) Wayne Andrews	Crystal Palace	3 June 2006	Free
(Denmark) Mikkel Bischoff	Manchester City	12 June 2006	Free
(England) Elliott Ward	West Ham United	16 June 2006	£1,000,000
(Scotland) Colin Cameron	Wolverhampton Wanderers	29 June 2006	Free
(England) Andy Marshall	Millwall	30 June 2006	Free
(Republic of Ireland) Jay Tabb	Brentford	1 July 2006	Undisclosed
(Trinidad and Tobago) Chris Birchall	Port Vale	5 August 2006	£300,000
(Morocco) Faysal El Idrissi	(United Arab Emirates) Al-Nasr	17 August 2006	Free
(Scotland) Kevin Kyle	Sunderland	25 August 2006	£600,000
(England) Leon McKenzie	Norwich City	31 August 2006	£1,000,000
(Spain) Rafael González-Robles	(Spain) Real Oviedo	14 September 2006	Free
(Malta) Michael Mifsud	(Norway) Lillestrøm	10 January 2007	Free
(Republic of Ireland) Colin Hawkins	(Republic of Ireland) Shelbourne	30 January 2007	Free
(New Zealand) Che Bunce	New Zealand Knights	31 January 2007	Free
(England) Arran Lee-Barrett	Weymouth	31 January 2007	Free

=== Out ===
Player	To	Date	Fee
(England) Dennis Wise	Released	30 May 2006	Free
(England) Andrew Impey	Released	30 May 2006	Free
(England) Luke Webb	Hereford United	30 May 2006	Free
(Northern Ireland) Jonathan Tuffey	(Scotland) Partick Thistle	30 May 2006	Free
(England) Rikki Bains	Accrington Stanley	31 May 2006	Free
(England) Richard Shaw	Millwall	29 June 2006	Free
(Wales) Ady Williams	Swindon Town	30 June 2006	Free
(Trinidad and Tobago) Clayton Ince	Walsall	8 July 2006	Free
(England) James Scowcroft	Crystal Palace	25 July 2006	£500,000
(England) Andy Morrell	Blackpool	15 August 2006	Free
(England) Gary McSheffrey	Birmingham City	16 August 2006	£4,000,000
(Republic of Ireland) Graham Barrett	(Scotland) Falkirk	1 August 2006	Free
(Faroe Islands) Claus Bech Jørgensen	Blackpool	8 September 2006	Free
(France) Faysal El Idrissi	Released	1 November 2006	Free
(Spain) Rafael González-Robles	Released	13 December 2006	Free
(Denmark) Mikkel Bischoff	(Denmark) Brøndby	2 January 2007	Free
(England) Matt Heath	Leeds United	2 January 2007	Free
(England) Craig Reid	Cheltenham Town	12 January 2007	Free
(Trinidad and Tobago) Stern John	Sunderland	29 January 2007	Undisclosed

=== Loans in ===
Player	From	Date From	Date Till
(England) Adam Virgo	(Scotland) Celtic	7 August 2006	15 August 2006
(England) Luke Steele	Manchester United	3 August 2006	10 August 2006
(Republic of Ireland) Clive Clarke	Sunderland	23 August 2006	10 January 2007
(Wales) Richard Duffy	Portsmouth	23 August 2006	27 December 2006
(England) Darren Currie	Ipswich Town	23 November 2006	2 January 2007
(England) Luke Steele	West Bromwich Albion	23 December 2006	7 May 2007
(England) Arran Lee-Barrett	Weymouth	12 January 2007	30 January 2007

=== Loans out ===
Player	To	Date From	Date Till
(England) Liam Davis	Peterborough United	14 September 2006	17 December 2006
(England) Ben Turner	Peterborough United	14 September 2006	14 December 2006
(England) Andy Whing	Brighton and Hove Albion	6 October 2006	28 December 2006
(England) Isaac Osbourne	Crewe Alexandra	20 October 2006	1 November 2006
(England) Matt Heath	Leeds United	10 November 2006	1 January 2007
(England) Wayne Andrews	Sheffield Wednesday	23 November 2006	2 January 2007
(England) Cameron Belford	Tamworth	26 December 2006	31 December 2006
(England) Wayne Andrews	Bristol City	19 January 2007	19 March 2007
(England) Ben Turner	Oldham Athletic	23 February 2007	23 March 2007
(England) Ryan Lynch	Tamworth	22 March 2007	28 April 2007

== Kit Profile ==
Supplier: Puma
Sponsor(s): Cassidy Group

Home Strip	Away Strip
