= 2007–08 Coventry City F.C. season =

Coventry City F.C.
2007–2008 season
- Manager: Iain Dowie (until 11 February); Chris Coleman (from 19 February)
- Championship: 21st
- FA Cup: 5th round
- League Cup: 4th round
Home colours	Away colours

The 2007–08 season was Coventry City's 88th season in The Football League and their 7th consecutive season in the Football League Championship. Along with competing in the Championship, the club also participated in the FA Cup and Football League Cup. The season covers the period from 1 July 2007 to 30 June 2008.

== Review and events ==
=== Monthly events ===
This is a list of the significant events to occur at the club during the 2007–08 season, presented in chronological order. This list does not include transfers, which are listed in the transfers section below, or match results, which are in the results section.

August:

- Iain Dowie is named Championship Manager of the Month.

September:

- Tribunal sets the prices for Gary Borrowdale and Leon Best.
  - £650,000 upfront for Best, rising to a maximum of £1,200,000.
  - £400,000 upfront for Borrowdale, rising to a maximum of £650,000.

October:

- Managing Director Paul Fletcher announces his resignation.
- Acting Chairman Geoffrey Robinson MP stands down with Joe Elliott taking his place.
- Transfer embargo installed due to failure to pay installment on Leon Best transfer.

November

- Potential takeover by Ray Ranson fronted SISU consortium hits an alleged financial stumbling block.

December

- With less than an hour before deadline, takeover by Ray Ranson fronted SISU consortium goes through.
- Club and new owners SISU file intent to go into administration as a precaution.

January

- Transfer embargo imposed in October is lifted.

February

- Iain Dowie is sacked as manager, with John Harbin and Frankie Bunn taking over as caretaker managers.
- Chris Coleman is appointed as new manager, with Steve Kean coming in as his assistant
- SISU acquire the 90% ownership of the club required to complete their takeover.

March

- Scott Dann and Daniel Fox are both called up into the England Under-21 squad for first time.

April

- Jay Tabb is voted the official Fans' Players of the Season, while Leon Best picks up Young Player Award.

May

- Coventry City escape relegation on the last day of the season despite 4–1 defeat to Charlton Athletic.

== Matches ==
=== Pre-season friendlies ===
21 July 2007	Northampton Town	1–1	Coventry City	Northampton
	Kirk 73'	(Report)	Best 21'; Ward (red card) 71'	Stadium: Sixfields Stadium

26 July 2007	Glentoran	1–2	Coventry City	Belfast
	Nixon 89' (pen.)	(Report)	Hawkins 47'; McKenzie 53'	Stadium: The Oval

29 July 2007	Ballymena United	0–6	Coventry City	Ballymena
		(Report)	Mifsud 13'; Doyle 45'; Gray 50', 55'; Adebola 62'; Simpson 86'	Stadium: Ballymena Showgrounds

31 July 2007	Coventry City	1–1	RCD Espanyol	Coventry
	Tabb 44'; Doyle (red card) 60'	(Report)	Torrejón 28'; Rufete (red card) 60'	Stadium: Ricoh Arena

4 August 2007	Coventry City	0–2	Udinese	Coventry
		(Report)	D'Agostino 18'; Gyan 80'	Stadium: Ricoh Arena

14 August 2007	Bedworth United	0–3	Coventry City	Bedworth
		(Report)	Simpson 16', 63'; Hildreth 86'	Stadium: The Oval Ground

=== Championship ===
11 August 2007 1	Barnsley	1–4	Coventry City	Barnsley
15:00	Howard 9' (pen.)	(Report)	McKenzie 6'; Kyle 50'; Gray 65'; Mifsud 90'	Stadium: Oakwell; Attendance: 12,616; Referee: Scott Mathieson

18 August 2007 2	Coventry City	1–1	Hull City	Coventry
15:00	McKenzie 51'	(Report)	Barmby 62'; Ricketts (red card) 68'	Stadium: Ricoh Arena; Attendance: 21,059; Referee: Barry Knight

25 August 2007 3	Cardiff City	0–1	Coventry City	Cardiff
15:00		(Report)	Tabb 23'	Stadium: Ninian Park; Attendance: 16,407; Referee: Rob Shoebridge

1 September 2007 4	Coventry City	2–1	Preston North End	Coventry
17:20	Adebola 80'; Doyle 85'	(Report)	Agyemang 16'	Stadium: Ricoh Arena; Attendance: 17,551; Referee: Anthony Taylor

15 September 2007 5	Coventry City	0–3	Bristol City	Coventry
15:00		(Report)	McIndoe 15'; Konstantopoulos 74' (o.g.); Byfield 90'	Stadium: Ricoh Arena; Attendance: 21,538; Referee: Phil Joslin

18 September 2007 6	Crystal Palace	1–1	Coventry City	London
20:00	Green 26'	(Report)	Best 87'	Stadium: Selhurst Park; Attendance: 14,455; Referee: Andy Woolmer

22 September 2007 7	Ipswich Town	4–1	Coventry City	Ipswich
17:20	De Vos 10'; Couñago 24', 57'; Walters 40'	(Report)	S. Hughes 69'	Stadium: Portman Road; Attendance: 18,840; Referee: Trevor Kettle

29 September 2007 8	Coventry City	1–1	Charlton Athletic	Coventry
15:00	Mifsud 84'	(Report)	Sam 15'	Stadium: Ricoh Arena; Attendance: 19,021; Referee: Neil Swarbrick

2 October 2007 9	Coventry City	3–1	Blackpool	Coventry
19:45	Doyle 44' (pen.); Mifsud 69'; Simpson 86'	(Report)	Morrell 32'; Gorkšs (red card) 81'	Stadium: Ricoh Arena; Attendance: 15,803; Referee: Mike Thorpe

6 October 2007 10	Wolverhampton Wanderers	1–0	Coventry City	Wolverhampton
15:00	Collins 90'	(Report)		Stadium: Molineux Stadium; Attendance: 24,338; Referee: Keith Stroud

20 October 2007 11	Plymouth Argyle	1–0	Coventry City	Plymouth
15:00	Martin 16'	(Report)		Stadium: Home Park; Attendance: 11,576; Referee: Keith Hill

23 October 2007 12	Coventry City	0–3	Watford	Coventry
19:45		(Report)	Johnson 30'; King 42'; Henderson 46'	Stadium: Ricoh Arena; Attendance: 17,032; Referee: Lee Probert

27 October 2007 13	Coventry City	1–0	Colchester United	Coventry
15:00	Mifsud 81'	(Report)	Sheringham (red card) 90'	Stadium: Ricoh Arena; Attendance: 23,431; Referee: Rayford Lee

3 November 2007 14	Stoke City	1–3	Coventry City	Stoke-on-Trent
15:00	Lawrence 72'	(Report)	Mifsud 58', 79'; Adebola 53'	Stadium: Britannia Stadium; Attendance: 11,576; Referee: Andre Marriner

6 November 2007 15	Queens Park Rangers	1–2	Coventry City	London
20:00	Buzsáky 50'	(Report)	Mifsud 61'; Kyle 90'	Stadium: Loftus Road; Attendance: 11,922; Referee: Anthony Bates

12 November 2007 16	Coventry City	0–4	West Bromwich Albion	Coventry
19:45	Mifsud (red card) 11'	(Report)	Robinson 56'; Teixeira 58', 73'; Koren 90'	Stadium: Ricoh Arena; Attendance: 18,566; Referee: Phil Dowd

24 November 2007 17	Norwich City	2–0	Coventry City	Norwich
15:00	Chadwick 34'; Cureton 77'	(Report)		Stadium: Carrow Road; Attendance: 24,590; Referee: Andy D'Urso

27 November 2007 18	Coventry City	1–1	Scunthorpe United	Coventry
15:00	Doyle 51' (pen.)	(Report)	Cork 68'; Murphy (red card) 49'; Youga (red card) 84'	Stadium: Ricoh Arena; Attendance: 14,036; Referee: Mike Jones

1 December 2007 19	Coventry City	0–1	Sheffield United	Coventry
15:00		(Report)	Armstrong 62'	Stadium: Ricoh Arena; Attendance: 20,355; Referee: Colin Webster

4 December 2007 20	West Bromwich Albion	2–4	Coventry City	West Bromwich
19:45	Bednář 52'; Brunt 65'; Robinson (red card) 71'	(Report)	Best 6', 83'; Mifsud 11', 86'	Stadium: The Hawthorns; Attendance: 20,641; Referee: Mark Clattenburg

15 December 2007 21	Coventry City	1–1	Southampton	Coventry
15:00	Tabb 19'	(Report)	Wright-Phillips 59'	Stadium: Ricoh Arena; Attendance: 19,143; Referee: Neil Swarbrick

22 December 2007 22	Blackpool	4–0	Coventry City	Blackpool
15:00	Hoolahan 28' (pen.); Flynn 65'; Gorkšs 72'; Vernon 88'	(Report)	Kyle (red card) 31'	Stadium: Bloomfield Road; Attendance: 8,690; Referee: Anthony Taylor

26 December 2007 23	Coventry City	0–2	Crystal Palace	Coventry
15:00		(Report)	Morrison 47'; Ifill 88'	Stadium: Ricoh Arena; Attendance: 22,134; Referee: Keith Stroud

29 December 2007 24	Coventry City	2–1	Ipswich Town	Coventry
17:20	Gray 11'; Adebola 64'	(Report)	Haynes 42'; Miller (red card) 86'	Stadium: Ricoh Arena; Attendance: 18,346; Referee: Iain Williamson

1 January 2008 25	Bristol City	2–1	Coventry City	Bristol
15:00	Byfield 5'; Elliott 67'	(Report)	Adebola 72'	Stadium: Ashton Gate; Attendance: 15,899; Referee: Paul Taylor

12 January 2008 26	Leicester City	2–0	Coventry City	Leicester
15:00	Howard 11'; Hayles 85'	(Report)		Stadium: Walkers Stadium; Attendance: 23,905; Referee: Martin Atkinson

19 January 2008 27	Coventry City	1–2	Burnley	Coventry
15:00	Doyle 26'; Kyle (red card) 56'	(Report)	Akinbiyi 10'; Blake 68'	Stadium: Ricoh Arena; Attendance: 17,347; Referee: Eddie Ilderton

29 January 2008 28	Hull City	1–0	Coventry City	Hull
19:45	Folan 90'	(Report)		Stadium: KC Stadium; Attendance: 14,822; Referee: Clive Oliver

2 February 2008 29	Coventry City	4–0	Barnsley	Coventry
15:00	Best 37', 84'; Gray 70'; Tabb 75'	(Report)		Stadium: Ricoh Arena; Attendance: 16,449; Referee: Mike Russell

9 February 2008 30	Preston North End	1–0	Coventry City	Preston
15:00	St Ledger 21'	(Report)		Stadium: Deepdale; Attendance: 11,857; Referee: Mike Pike

12 February 2008 31	Coventry City	0–0	Cardiff City	Coventry
19:45		(Report)		Stadium: Ricoh Arena; Attendance: 15,260; Referee: Danny McDermid

23 February 2008 32	Coventry City	2–0	Leicester City	Coventry
15:00	Ward 32' (pen.); Best 79'	(Report)		Stadium: Ricoh Arena; Attendance: 23,129; Referee: Keith Stroud

26 February 2008 33	Burnley	2–0	Coventry City	Burnley
19:45	McCann 20'; Caldwell 85'	(Report)		Stadium: Turf Moor; Attendance: 9,779; Referee: Anthony Bates

1 March 2008 34	Scunthorpe United	2–1	Coventry City	Scunthorpe
15:00	Paterson 15'; Cork 66'	(Report)	Thornton 21' (pen.)	Stadium: Glanford Park; Attendance: 5,866; Referee: Steve Bratt

5 March 2008 35	Coventry City	0–0	Queens Park Rangers	Coventry
19:45		(Report)		Stadium: Ricoh Arena; Attendance: 15,225; Referee: Mike Dean

8 March 2008 36	Coventry City	1–0	Norwich City	Coventry
15:00	Tabb 6'	(Report)	Doherty (red card) 53'; Russell (red card) 85'	Stadium: Ricoh Arena; Attendance: 18,108; Referee: Paul Taylor

11 March 2008 37	Sheffield United	2–1	Coventry City	Sheffield
19:45	Sharp 69'; Speed 78'	(Report)	Ward 81' (pen.)	Stadium: Bramall Lane; Attendance: 23,864; Referee: Trevor Kettle

15 March 2008 38	Coventry City	0–0	Sheffield Wednesday	Coventry
15:00		(Report)		Stadium: Ricoh Arena; Attendance: 19,283; Referee: Jarnail Singh

22 March 2008 39	Southampton	0–0	Coventry City	Southampton
15:00		(Report)		Stadium: St Mary's Stadium; Attendance: 22,014; Referee: Clive Penton

29 March 2008 40	Coventry City	3–1	Plymouth Argyle	Coventry
15:00	Doyle 37', 43'; Tabb 65'	(Report)	MacLean 81'	Stadium: Ricoh Arena; Attendance: 18,775; Referee: Richard Beeby

1 April 2008 41	Sheffield Wednesday	1–1	Coventry City	Sheffield
19:45	Wood 90'	(Report)	Hines 82'	Stadium: Hillsborough; Attendance: 21,110; Referee: Graham Laws

5 April 2008 42	Watford	2–1	Coventry City	Watford
15:00	Ellington 7'; Smith 79'	(Report)	Best 59'	Stadium: Vicarage Road; Attendance: 17,188; Referee: Darren Deadman

12 April 2008 43	Coventry City	1–2	Stoke City	Coventry
15:00	Ward 31' (pen.)	(Report)	Fuller 55' (pen.); Lawrence 79'	Stadium: Ricoh Arena; Attendance: 20,249; Referee: Uriah Rennie

19 April 2008 44	Colchester United	1–5	Coventry City	Colchester
15:00	Vernon 17'	(Report)	Best 48'; Fox 51'; Ward 78' (pen.), 90' (pen.); Doyle 80'	Stadium: Layer Road; Attendance: 5,836; Referee: Colin Webster

26 April 2008 45	Coventry City	1–1	Wolverhampton Wanderers	Coventry
15:00	Ward 18'	(Report)	Ebanks-Blake 53' (pen.)	Stadium: Ricoh Arena; Attendance: 27,992; Referee: Paul Armstrong

4 May 2008 46	Charlton Athletic	4–1	Coventry City	Charlton
14:00	Varney 4'; Gray 19'; Basey 48'; Powell 86'	(Report)	Mifsud 20'	Stadium: The Valley; Attendance: 26,130; Referee: Andy D'Urso

=== League Cup ===
14 August 2007 First round	Coventry City	3–0	Notts County	Coventry
19:45	Adebola 47'; Best 67'; Simpson 78'	(Report)		Stadium: Ricoh Arena; Attendance: 6,735; Referee: Rayford Lee

28 August 2007 Second round	Carlisle United	0–2	Coventry City	Carlisle
19:45		(Report)	Mifsud 21', 56'	Stadium: Brunton Park; Attendance: 5,744; Referee: Jonathan Moss

26 September 2007 Third round	Manchester United	0–2	Coventry City	Manchester
20:00		(Report)	Mifsud 27', 70'	Stadium: Old Trafford; Attendance: 74,055; Referee: Mark Halsey

30 October 2007 Fourth round	Coventry City	1–2	West Ham United	Coventry
19:45	Tabb 68'	(Report)	Hall 72' (o.g.); Cole 90'	Stadium: Ricoh Arena; Attendance: 23,968; Referee: Rob Styles

=== FA Cup ===
5 January 2008 Third round	Blackburn Rovers	1–4	Coventry City	Blackburn
15:00	Bentley 85'	(Report)	Mifsud 34', 90'; Ward 64' (pen.); Adebola 83'	Stadium: Ewood Park; Attendance: 14,421; Referee: Lee Probert

26 January 2008 Fourth round	Coventry City	2–1	Millwall	Coventry
15:00	S. Hughes 16'; Mifsud 52'	(Report)	Simpson 42'	Stadium: Ricoh Arena; Attendance: 17,268; Referee: Nigel Miller

16 February 2008 Fifth round	Coventry City	0–5	West Bromwich Albion	Coventry
15:00	Doyle (red card) 48'	(Report)	Brunt 12'; Bednář 59', 69' (pen.); Miller 76'; Gera 78'	Stadium: Ricoh Arena; Attendance: 28,163; Referee: Mark Halsey

== Season statistics ==
=== Appearances and goals ===
No.	Pos	Nat	Player	Total		Championship		League Cup		FA Cup	
No.	Pos	Nat	Player	Apps	Goals	Apps	Goals	Apps	Goals	Apps	Goals
1	GK	(Greece) GRE	Dimitrios Konstantopoulos	23	0	21	0	0	0	2	0
2	DF	(Netherlands) NED	Arjan De Zeeuw	19	0	16+1	0	1	0	1	0
3	DF	(England) ENG	Marcus Hall	21	0	17+1	0	1+1	0	1	0
4	DF	(Wales) WAL	Rob Page	2	0	0	0	2	0	0	0
4	DF	(England) ENG	Daniel Fox	18	0	18	0	0	0	0	0
5	DF	(England) ENG	Elliott Ward	42	7	35+2	6	2	0	3	1
6	MF	(England) ENG	Stephen Hughes	41	2	32+5	1	3	0	1	1
7	MF	(England) ENG	Wayne Andrews	7	0	0+7	0	0	0	0	0
8	MF	(Republic of Ireland) IRL	Michael Doyle	49	7	42	7	4	0	3	0
9	FW	(Nigeria) NGR	Dele Adebola	31	6	15+11	4	2+1	1	2	1
9	FW	(England) ENG	Zavon Hines	7	1	0+7	1	0	0	0	0
10	FW	(Scotland) SCO	Kevin Kyle	14	2	7+6	2	0+1	0	0	0
11	MF	(Trinidad and Tobago) TTO	Chris Birchall	3	0	1	0	0+1	0	0+1	0
14	MF	(Netherlands) NED	Ellery Cairo	8	0	4+3	0	1	0	0	0
15	FW	(England) ENG	Leon McKenzie	11	2	9+2	2	0	0	0	0
16	MF	(England) ENG	Isaac Osbourne	49	0	37+5	0	4	0	3	0
17	FW	(Malta) MLT	Michael Mifsud	47	17	34+7	10	3	4	3	3
18	DF	(Scotland) SCO	David McNamee	15	1	12+1	1	1+1	0	0	0
19	DF	(England) ENG	Stuart Giddings	0	0	0	0	0	0	0	0
20	DF	(Republic of Ireland) IRL	Colin Hawkins	1	0	0	0	1	0	0	0
21	MF	(Republic of Ireland) IRL	Jay Tabb	49	6	40+2	5	3+1	1	3	0
22	FW	(Republic of Ireland) IRL	Leon Best	40	9	29+5	8	3	1	2+1	0
23	GK	(Australia) AUS	Danny Ireland	0	0	0	0	0	0	0	0
24	FW	(England) ENG	Robbie Simpson	34	2	10+18	1	1+3	1	1+1	0
25	MF	(England) ENG	Julian Gray	29	3	20+6	3	2	0	1	0
26	DF	(England) ENG	Scott Dann	16	0	14+2	0	0	0	0	0
27	MF	(Northern Ireland) NIR	Michael Hughes	20	0	16+2	0	0	0	2	0
28	DF	(England) ENG	Gary Borrowdale	26	0	20+1	0	3	0	2	0
29	MF	(England) ENG	Kevin Thornton	20	1	9+10	1	0	0	0+1	0
30	MF	(England) ENG	Liam Davis	7	0	2+4	0	0	0	1	0
31	FW	(England) ENG	Donovan Simmonds	0	0	0	0	0	0	0	0
32	GK	(Denmark) DEN	Kasper Schmeichel	9	0	9	0	0	0	0	0
33	GK	(England) ENG	Andy Marshall	21	0	16	0	4	0	1	0
34	DF	(England) ENG	Ben Turner	23	0	19	0	2+1	0	1	0
35	MF	(England) ENG	Lee Hildreth	0	0	0	0	0	0	0	0
36	DF	(England) ENG	Liam Francis	0	0	0	0	0	0	0	0
38	DF	(Wales) WAL	Richard Duffy	2	0	2	0	0	0	0	0

Notes:

- Player substitutions are not included.

=== Goalscorers ===
- 14 players have scored for the Coventry City first team during the 2007–08 season.
- 66 goals were scored in total during the 2007–08 season.
  - 52 in the Championship
  - 8 in the League Cup
  - 6 in the FA Cup
- The top goalscorer was Michael Mifsud with 17 goals.

Name	Championship	League Cup	FA Cup	Total
Michael Mifsud	10	4	3	17
Leon Best	8	1	0	9
Elliott Ward	6	0	1	7
Michael Doyle	7	0	0	7
Jay Tabb	5	1	0	6
Dele Adebola	4	1	1	6
Julian Gray	3	0	0	3
Robbie Simpson	1	1	0	2
Leon McKenzie	2	0	0	2
Kevin Kyle	2	0	0	2
Stephen Hughes	1	0	1	1
Kevin Thornton	1	0	0	1
Zavon Hines	1	0	0	1
Daniel Fox	1	0	0	1

=== Yellow cards ===
- 24 players have been booked for the Coventry City first team during the 2007–08 season.
- 90 bookings were received in total during the 2007–08 season.
  - 47 in the Championship
  - 3 in the League Cup
  - 2 in the FA Cup
- The most booked player was Leon Best with 11 cards.

Name	Championship	League Cup	FA Cup	Total
Leon Best	10	1	0	(yellow card) 11
Michael Doyle	7	0	1	(yellow card) 8
Elliott Ward	7	0	0	(yellow card) 7
Stephen Hughes	7	0	0	(yellow card) 7
Isaac Osbourne	5	1	0	(yellow card) 6
Arjan De Zeeuw	6	0	0	(yellow card) 6
Daniel Fox	5	0	0	(yellow card) 5
Jay Tabb	4	0	0	(yellow card) 4
Michael Mifsud	4	0	0	(yellow card) 4
Robbie Simpson	3	0	0	(yellow card) 3
David McNamee	3	0	0	(yellow card) 3
Kevin Kyle	3	0	0	(yellow card) 3
Scott Dann	3	0	0	(yellow card) 3
Gary Borrowdale	3	0	0	(yellow card) 3
Dele Adebola	2	1	0	(yellow card) 3
Kevin Thornton	2	0	0	(yellow card) 2
Michael Hughes	2	0	0	(yellow card) 2
Liam Davis	2	0	0	(yellow card) 2
Ellery Cairo	2	0	0	(yellow card) 2
Ben Turner	2	0	0	(yellow card) 2
Leon McKenzie	1	0	0	(yellow card) 1
Marcus Hall	1	0	0	(yellow card) 1
Julian Gray	0	0	1	(yellow card) 1
Richard Duffy	1	0	0	(yellow card) 1

=== Red cards ===
- 3 players have been sent off for the Coventry City first team during the 2007–08 season.
- 4 players were sent off in total during the 2007–08 season.
  - 4 in the Championship
  - 0 in the League Cup
  - 0 in the FA Cup
- The most sent off player was Kevin Kyle with 2 sending offs.

Name	Championship	League Cup	FA Cup	Total
Kevin Kyle	2	0	0	(red card) 2
Michael Doyle	1	0	0	(red card) 1
Michael Mifsud	1	0	0	(red card) 1

== Transfers ==
=== Transfers in ===
Player	From	Date	Fee
(Greece) Dimitrios Konstantopoulos	Hartlepool United	25 May 2007	Free
(Netherlands) Arjan De Zeeuw	Wigan Athletic	30 June 2007	Free
(Netherlands) Ellery Cairo	Hertha Berlin	30 June 2007	Free
(England) Donovan Simmonds	Charlton Athletic	1 July 2007	Free
(England) Robbie Simpson	Cambridge United	1 July 2007	£40,000
(England) Leon Best	Southampton	6 July 2007	£650,000
(England) Gary Borrowdale	Crystal Palace	6 July 2007	£400,000
(Northern Ireland) Michael Hughes	Crystal Palace	6 July 2007	Free
(England) Julian Gray	Birmingham City	10 July 2007	Free
(England) Daniel Fox	Walsall	28 January 2008	Undisclosed
(England) Scott Dann	Walsall	1 February 2008	Undisclosed

=== Transfers out ===
Player	To	Date	Fee
(England) Arran Lee-Barrett	Hartlepool United	25 May 2007	Free
(England) Andy Whing	Brighton & Hove Albion	7 June 2007	Free
(Senegal) Khalilou Fadiga	K.A.A. Gent	1 July 2007	Free
(New Zealand) Che Bunce	Waikato FC	1 July 2007	Free
(Scotland) Don Hutchison	Luton Town	26 July 2007	Free
(Scotland) Colin Cameron	Milton Keynes Dons	1 August 2007	Free
(England) Cameron Belford	Bury	10 August 2007	Free
(England) Ryan Lynch	Crewe Alexandra	17 August 2007	Free
(England) Andy Gooding	Rushden & Diamonds	1 January 2008	Free
(Wales) Rob Page	Huddersfield Town	21 January 2008	Free
(Nigeria) Dele Adebola	Bristol City	31 January 2008	Undisclosed

=== Loans in ===
Player	From	Date From	Date Till
(Denmark) Kasper Schmeichel	Manchester City	13 March 2008	5 May 2008
(Wales) Richard Duffy	Portsmouth	21 March 2008	6 April 2008
(England) Zavon Hines	West Ham United	27 March 2008	5 May 2008

=== Loans out ===
Player	To	Date From	Date Till
(England) Stuart Giddings	Oldham Athletic	10 August 2007	1 January 2008
(Trinidad and Tobago) Chris Birchall	St Mirren	31 August 2007	2 December 2007
(England) Andy Gooding	Burton Albion	31 August 2007	18 November 2007
(England) Wayne Andrews	Leeds United	1 October 2007	1 November 2007
(Greece) Dimitrios Konstantopoulos	Nottingham Forest	25 March 2008	29 March 2008
(Scotland) Kevin Kyle	Wolverhampton Wanderers	30 January 2008	20 April 2008
(Republic of Ireland) Colin Hawkins	Chesterfield	27 March 2008	4 May 2008
(England) Wayne Andrews	Bristol Rovers	27 March 2008	27 April 2008
(England) Donovan Simmonds	Gillingham	27 March 2008	27 April 2008

== Kit profile ==
Supplier: Puma
Sponsor(s): Cassidy Group

Home Strip	Away Strip
