= 2010–11 Fulham F.C. season =

Fulham
2010–2011 season
- Chairman: Mohamed Al-Fayed
- Manager: Mark Hughes
- Stadium: Craven Cottage
- Premier League: 8th
- FA Cup: Fifth round
- League Cup: Third round
- Top goalscorer: League: Clint Dempsey (12); All: Clint Dempsey (13)
Home colours	Away colours	Third colours

The 2010–11 Fulham season was the club's 113th professional season and its tenth consecutive season in the top flight of English football, the Premier League. The season commenced on 14 August 2010 and concluded on 22 May 2011 after 38 league matches. Due to its 12th-placed finish in the league the previous season and defeat in the Europa League Final, Fulham did not qualify for European competition. In addition to the Premier League, the club entered the Football League Cup in the second round, and the FA Cup in the third round.

Manager Roy Hodgson left the club during the summer after three seasons to replace Rafael Benítez at Liverpool. On 29 July, Fulham confirmed former Manchester United, Blackburn Rovers and Wales national team coach Mark Hughes as its new manager.

Despite drawing 16 games in the Premier League, it was a successful season for Hughes and Fulham as the club finished eighth, the second-highest position in the club's history. Fulham were eliminated from the Football League Cup in the third round, but progressed to the fifth round of the FA Cup before exiting the competition. Clint Dempsey finished as the club's overall top scorer for the season, with 13 goals in all competitions. Fulham qualified for the following season's UEFA Europa League after finishing as one of the top teams in the UEFA Fair Play rankings.

== Pre-season and friendlies ==
=== Matches ===
Fulham initially arranged three pre-season friendlies, away to Brentford (14 July) and AFC Bournemouth (17 July), and at home against German side Werder Bremen on 7 August. The club announced a further friendly against Portsmouth, as a testimonial match for former Portsmouth defender Linvoy Primus, who had been forced to retire due to injury. The match was played on 31 July. Fulham also organised a ten-day tour to Sweden, with friendlies fixtures against Halmstads BK on 22 July and Malmö FF on 27 July.

The first team squad returned to training on 6 July, with the exception of Mark Schwarzer, John Pantsil, Clint Dempsey, Kagisho Dikgacoi, Dickson Etuhu and Philippe Senderos who had been competing in the 2010 FIFA World Cup in South Africa. The first pre-season fixture against Brentford ended in a 5–0 victory, with Chris Baird, David Elm, Damien Duff, Eddie Johnson and Simon Davies all getting on the scoresheet, while Brentford's Charlie MacDonald missed a penalty that would have brought Brentford level at 1–1. The second match against AFC Bournemouth was played three days later at Dean Court. Fulham striker Bobby Zamora scored an equaliser after Anton Robinson's opening goal to secure a 1–1 draw. The squad then travelled to Sweden, where they faced Halmstads BK and Malmö FF. Zoltán Gera scored twice against Halmstad in a 2–2 draw as Fulham came from 2–1 behind to draw the match. Gera put Fulham ahead in the eighth minute but Joe Sise turned the game around with two goals (24 and 26) before Gera scored again in the 58th minute. The match against Malmö ended in a 0–0 draw.

Fulham's final two pre-season matches were back in England. Hughes watched from the stands as Fulham lost 1–0 to Portsmouth who had been relegated to the Championship, with Marc Wilson scoring the only goal of the match. The club then welcomed German side Werder Bremen to Craven Cottage. Gera scored a hat-trick and Zamora and Johnson both scored in a 5–1 victory; Claudio Pizarro scored the goal for the away side.

Date	Opponents	H / A	Result F – A	Scorers	Attendance
14 July 2010	Brentford	A	5–0	Baird 14', Elm 24', Duff 29', Johnson 49', Davies 67'	4,167
17 July 2010	AFC Bournemouth	A	1–1	Zamora 26' (Bournemouth: Robinson 10')	3,081
22 July 2010	Halmstads BK	A	2–2	Gera 8', 58' (Halmstad: Sise 24', 26')	1,885
27 July 2010	Malmö FF	A	0–0		5,019
31 July 2010	Portsmouth	A	0–1	(Portsmouth: Wilson 37')	6,605
7 August 2010	Werder Bremen	H	5–1	Zamora 53', Gera 65', 71', 76', Johnson 86' (Werder: Pizarro 10')	8,149

=== Transfers ===
After the departure of Chris Smalling to Manchester United, fellow defender Philippe Senderos was Fulham's first signing of the summer when he moved from Arsenal on a free transfer. Nicky Shorey and Stefano Okaka both returned to Aston Villa and Roma respectively at the end of their loan deals, while Wayne Brown was released. Erik Nevland, Toni Kallio, Christopher Buchtmann, Michael Uwezu, Andranik Teymourian and Stefan Payne all left the club at the beginning of July. Jonathan Greening committed his future to Fulham by completing a permanent transfer from West Bromwich Albion after a season-long loan.

Fulham made further signings following the start of the Premier League season. Mousa Dembélé moved in a £5 million deal from Dutch side AZ. Algerian defender Rafik Halliche signed for the club on 24 August from Benfica for an undisclosed fee. Three days later, Fulham secured a deal to bring Mexican defender Carlos Salcido to the club for £1.5 million. On transfer deadline day, defender Paul Konchesky departed to Liverpool, with two young players – Lauri Dalla Valle and Alex Kačaniklić – joining Fulham as part of the deal.

=== Managerial change ===
Following Roy Hodgson's decision to replace Rafael Benítez as the manager of Liverpool, Sven-Göran Eriksson, Bob Bradley, Alan Curbishley and Ottmar Hitzfeld – the managers of the Ivory Coast national team, United States national team and Switzerland national team respectively – were all strongly linked to the job, but Ajax coach Martin Jol emerged as the favourite for the post. After Jol chose to stay with Ajax and Bradley renewed his contract with the United States, Fulham appointed Mark Hughes as its new manager; he was presented to the press on 3 August.

== Kit ==
On 24 May 2010, Fulham signed a three-year deal with Kappa after having three seasons with Nike. The shirt sponsor was FxPro. The home kit is white and black, the away kit is red and grey and the third kit is green and gold (the same colours as Harrods which Mohammed Al Fayed used to own).

- Designer – Kappa
- Sponsor – FxPro

== Premier League ==
The Premier League started on 14 August 2010. The provisional fixture list was announced on 17 June 2010, with Fulham starting the season with a match against Bolton Wanderers at the Reebok Stadium. The first match of the season was an even contest that ended 0–0, with Fulham goalkeeper David Stockdale turning in a good performance while deputising for Mark Schwarzer. Fulham then faced Manchester United at Craven Cottage in the first home match of the season. Paul Scholes gave the away side the lead in the 11th minute. Midfielder Simon Davies scored the equaliser and Fulham's first goal of the season after 57 minutes. The game turned in both directions in the final ten minutes: defender Brede Hangeland scored an own goal in the 84th minute, only to redeem himself five minutes later by scoring at the other end of the pitch to equalise for Fulham and earn a 2–2 draw. Nani also had a penalty kick, given for a handball by Damien Duff, saved by Stockdale which would have made the scoreline 3–1 to the away team.

Fulham next played against Premier League newcomers Blackpool at Bloomfield Road, the first top league match at the stadium for 39 years. Fulham's Bobby Zamora opened the scoring in the 35th minute and the score remained at 1–0 until the 71st minute when John Paintsil scored an own goal in Blackpool's favour. Luke Varney then put Blackpool in front at 2–1, but Dickson Etuhu scored again for Fulham (87), securing their third successive league draw.

14 August 2010 1	Bolton Wanderers	0–0	Fulham	Bolton
		(Report)		Stadium: Reebok Stadium; Attendance: 20,352; Referee: Stuart Attwell

22 August 2010 2	Fulham	2–2	Manchester United	London
16:00	Davies 57'; Hangeland 89'	(Report)	Scholes 11'; Hangeland 84' (o.g.)	Stadium: Craven Cottage; Attendance: 25,643; Referee: Peter Walton

28 August 2010 3	Blackpool	2–2	Fulham	Blackpool
	Paintsil 71' (o.g.); Varney 76'	(Report)	Zamora 35'; Etuhu 87'	Stadium: Bloomfield Road; Attendance: 15,529; Referee: Michael Oliver

11 September 2010 4	Fulham	2–1	Wolverhampton Wanderers	London
	Dembélé 49', 90'	(Report)	Jelle Van Damme 10'; Berra (red card) 89'	Stadium: Craven Cottage; Attendance: 25,280; Referee: Phil Dowd

18 September 2010 5	Blackburn Rovers	1–1	Fulham	Blackburn
	Samba 30'	(Report)	Dempsey 56'	Stadium: Ewood Park; Attendance: 23,759; Referee: Anthony Taylor

25 September 2010 6	Fulham	0–0	Everton	London
		(Report)		Stadium: Craven Cottage; Attendance: 25,598; Referee: Howard Webb

2 October 2010 7	West Ham United	1–1	Fulham	London
	Piquionne 51'	(Report)	Dempsey 33'	Stadium: Boleyn Ground; Attendance: 34,859; Referee: Andre Marriner

16 October 2010 8	Fulham	1–2	Tottenham Hotspur	London
	Kamara 30'	(Report)	Pavlyunchenko 31'; Huddlestone 63'	Stadium: Craven Cottage; Attendance: 25,615; Referee: Mike Dean

23 October 2010 9	West Bromwich Albion	2–1	Fulham	West Bromwich
	Mulumbu 17'; Fortuné 40'	(Report)	Carson 9' (o.g.)	Stadium: The Hawthorns; Attendance: 25,625; Referee: Kevin Friend

30 October 2010 10	Fulham	2–0	Wigan Athletic	London
	Dempsey 30', 44'	(Report)		Stadium: Craven Cottage; Attendance: 25,448; Referee: Andre Marriner

6 November 2010 11	Fulham	1–1	Aston Villa	London
	Hangeland 90'	(Report)	Albrighton 41'	Stadium: Craven Cottage; Attendance: 24,000; Referee: Peter Walton

10 November 2010 12	Chelsea	1–0	Fulham	London
	Essien 30', (red card) 90'	(Report)		Stadium: Stamford Bridge; Attendance: 41,593; Referee: Martin Atkinson

13 November 2010 13	Newcastle United F.C.	0–0	Fulham	Newcastle
		(Report)		Stadium: St James' Park; Attendance: 44,686; Referee: Lee Probert

21 November 2010 14	Fulham	1–4	Manchester City	London
	Gera 70'	(Report)	Tevez 6', 56'; Zabaleta 32'; Y. Touré 35'	Stadium: Craven Cottage; Attendance: 25,694; Referee: Lee Mason

27 November 2010 15	Fulham	1–1	Birmingham City	London
	Dempsey 53'	(Report)	Larsson 20'	Stadium: Craven Cottage; Attendance: 24,391; Referee: Howard Webb

4 December 2010 16	Arsenal	2–1	Fulham	London
	Nasri 14', 75'	(Report)	Kamara 30'	Stadium: Emirates Stadium; Attendance: 60,049; Referee: Chris Foy

11 December 2010 17	Fulham	0–0	Sunderland	London
		(Report)		Stadium: Craven Cottage; Attendance: 24,462; Referee: Neil Swarbrick

26 December 2010 18	Fulham	1–3	West Ham United	London
	Hughes 11'	(Report)	Cole 37', 73'; Piquionne 45'	Stadium: Craven Cottage; Attendance: 25,332; Referee: Mark Halsey

28 December 2010 19	Stoke City	0–2	Fulham	Stoke-on-Trent
		(Report)	Baird 4', 10'	Stadium: Britannia Stadium; Attendance: 26,954; Referee: Kevin Friend

1 January 2011 20	Tottenham Hotspur	1–0	Fulham	London
	Bale 42'	(Report)		Stadium: White Hart Lane; Attendance: 35,603; Referee: Mike Jones

4 January 2011 21	Fulham	3–0	West Bromwich Albion	London
	Davies 45'; Dempsey 56'; Hangeland 65'	(Report)		Stadium: Craven Cottage; Attendance: 23,654; Referee: Martin Atkinson

15 January 2011 22	Wigan Athletic	1–1	Fulham	Wigan
	Rodallega 57'	(Report)	Johnson 85'	Stadium: DW Stadium; Attendance: 18,820; Referee: Anthony Taylor

22 January 2011 23	Fulham	2–0	Stoke City	London
	Clint Dempsey 33', 56' (pen.)	(Report)		Stadium: Craven Cottage; Attendance: 23,766; Referee: Stuart Attwell

26 January 2011 24	Liverpool	1–0	Fulham	Liverpool
	Paintsil 52' (o.g.)	(Report)		Stadium: Anfield; Attendance: 40,466; Referee: Lee Probert

2 February 2011 25	Fulham	1–0	Newcastle United	London
	Duff 67'	(Report)		Stadium: Craven Cottage; Attendance: 25,620; Referee: Mike Jones

5 February 2011 26	Aston Villa	2–2	Fulham	Birmingham
	Paintsil 13' (o.g.); Walker 72'	(Report)	Johnson 52'; Dempsey 78'	Stadium: Villa Park; Attendance: 35,899; Referee: Lee Mason

14 February 2011 27	Fulham	0–0	Chelsea	London
		(Report)		Stadium: Craven Cottage; Attendance: 25,685; Referee: Mike Dean

27 February 2011 28	Manchester City F.C.	1–1	Fulham	Manchester
	Balotelli 26'	(Report)	Duff 48'	Stadium: City of Manchester Stadium; Attendance: 43,077; Referee: Peter Walton

5 March 2011 29	Fulham	3–2	Blackburn	London
	Duff 37', 59'; Zamora 89' (pen.)	(Report)	Hanley 45'; Hoilett 65'	Stadium: Craven Cottage; Attendance: 25,687; Referee: Mark Clattenburg

19 March 2011 30	Everton	2–1	Fulham	Liverpool
	Coleman 36'; Saha 49'	(Report)	Dempsey 62'	Stadium: Goodison Park; Attendance: 33,239; Referee: Michael Oliver

3 April 2011 31	Fulham	3–0	Blackpool	London
	Zamora 23', 28'; Etuhu 72'	(Report)		Stadium: Craven Cottage; Attendance: 25,692; Referee: Stuart Attwell

9 April 2011 32	Manchester United	2–0	Fulham	Manchester
	Berbatov 12'; Valencia 32'	(Report)		Stadium: Old Trafford; Attendance: 75,339; Referee: Mike Jones

23 April 2011 33	Wolverhampton Wanderers	1–1	Fulham	Wolverhampton
	Fletcher 22'	(Report)	Johnson 80'	Stadium: Molineux; Attendance: 28,825; Referee: Michael Oliver

27 April 2011 34	Fulham	3–0	Bolton Wanderers	London
	Dempsey 15', 48'; Hangeland 65'	(Report)		Stadium: Craven Cottage; Attendance: 23,222; Referee: Anthony Taylor

30 April 2011 35	Sunderland	0–3	Fulham	Sunderland
		(Report)	Kakuta 33'; Davies 61', 73'	Stadium: Stadium of Light; Attendance: 39,576; Referee: Martin Atkinson

9 May 2011 36	Fulham	2–5	Liverpool	London
	Dembélé 57'; Sidwell 86'	(Report)	Rodríguez 1', 7', 70'; Kuyt 16'; Suárez 75'	Stadium: Craven Cottage; Attendance: 25,693; Referee: Lee Mason

15 May 2011 37	Birmingham City	0–2	Fulham	Birmingham
		(Report)	Hangeland 5', 49'	Stadium: St Andrew's; Attendance: 27,759; Referee: Peter Walton

22 May 2011 38	Fulham	2–2	Arsenal	London
	Sidwell 26'; Zamora 56'; Gera (red card) 74'	(Report)	Van Persie 29'; Walcott 89'	Stadium: Craven Cottage; Attendance: 25,674; Referee: Martin Atkinson

Pos	Club	Pld	W	D	L	F	A	GD	Pts
7	Everton	38	13	15	10	51	45	+6	54
8	Fulham	38	11	16	11	49	43	+6	49
9	Aston Villa	38	12	12	14	48	59	−11	48

Pld = Matches played; W = Matches won; D = Matches drawn; L = Matches lost; F = Goals for; A = Goals against; GD = Goal difference; Pts = Points

Last updated: 25 May..
Source: Barclays Premier League

=== Results summary ===
Overall								Home						Away					
Pld	W	D	L	GF	GA	GD	Pts	W	D	L	GF	GA	GD	W	D	L	GF	GA	GD
38	11	16	11	49	43	+6	49	8	7	4	30	23	+7	3	9	7	19	20	−1

Last updated: 22 May..
Source: http://www.premierleague.com/page/Results

Round	1	2	3	4	5	6	7	8	9	10	11	12	13	14	15	16	17	18	19	20	21	22	23	24	25	26	27	28	29	30	31	32	33	34	35	36	37	38
Ground	A	H	A	H	A	H	A	H	A	H	H	A	A	H	H	A	H	H	A	A	H	A	H	A	H	A	H	A	H	A	H	A	A	H	A	H	A	H
Result	D	D	D	W	D	D	D	L	L	W	D	L	D	L	D	L	D	L	W	L	W	D	W	L	W	D	D	D	W	L	W	L	D	W	W	L	W	D
Position	9	13	11	5	6	6	9	11	16	8	12	15	16	17	17	17	17	18	17	18	13	15	14	15	12	12	12	13	11	12	10	11	13	9	9	10	8	8

Updated to match(es) played on 22 May. Source: premierleague.com
A = Away; H = Home; W = Win; D = Draw; L = Loss

== FA Cup ==
Fulham were drawn against Peterborough United at home in the 3rd round of the FA Cup on 28 November 2010.

8 January 2011 R3	Fulham	6–2	Peterborough United	London
15:00 GMT	Kamara 32', 59', 76'; Hangeland (yellow card) 34'; Etuhu 45+1'; Gera 66'; Greening 89'	(Report)	(yellow card) 6' Zakuani; 71' Tomlin; 86' (pen.) McCann	Stadium: Craven Cottage; Attendance: 15,936; Referee: Lee Mason

30 January 2011 R4	Fulham	4–0	Tottenham Hotspur	London
16:30 GMT	Murphy 11' (pen.), 14' (pen.); Hangeland 23'; Duff (yellow card) 35'; Dembélé 45+3'	(Report)	(red card) 13' Dawson; (yellow card) 27' Van der Vaart	Stadium: Craven Cottage; Attendance: 21,829; Referee: Phil Dowd

20 February 2011 R5	Fulham	0–1	Bolton Wanderers	London
15:00 GMT	Baird (yellow card) 58'	(Report)	Klasnić 19'; Muamba (yellow card) 51'; Petrov (yellow card) 58'; Robinson (yellow card) 72'; Holden (yellow card) 90'	Stadium: Craven Cottage; Attendance: 19,571; Referee: Stuart Attwell

Last updated: 20 February 2011
Source: Fulham F.C.

== Football League Cup ==
As a Premier League side not competing in European competition, Fulham entered the Football League Cup at the second round stage. The draw was made following the conclusion of the first round ties and saw Fulham facing a home match against Port Vale from League Two. Zoltan Gera and Bobby Zamora both scored twice and Clint Dempsey and new signing Mousa Dembélé also scored in a 6–0 victory. Gera gave Fulham the lead after 10 minutes; Dembélé doubled the advantage (26), Zamora scored a third goal in the 36th minute. Gera (47) and Zamora (66) both scored after half-time and Dempsey added a sixth goal in the 70th minute to round off the victory.

In the draw for the third round, Fulham were handed a meeting against fellow Premier League team Stoke City at the Britannia Stadium on 21 September 2010. Fulham lost this game 2–0 which ended their 2010/2011 Carling Cup campaign.

25 August 2010 R2	Fulham	6–0	Port Vale	London
20:00 BST	Gera 10', 47'; Dembélé 26'; Zamora 36', 66'; Dempsey 70'	(Report)	(yellow card) 65' Rigg	Stadium: Craven Cottage; Attendance: 9,031; Referee: Andy Penn

21 September 2010 R3	Stoke City	2–0	Fulham	Stoke-on-Trent
19:45 BST	Etherington (yellow card) 13'; Higginbotham 23'; Jones 79'; Wilkinson (yellow card) 90+3'	(Report)	(yellow card) 13' Murphy	Stadium: Britannia Stadium; Attendance: 12,778; Referee: Mark Halsey

Last updated: 21 September 2010
Source: Fulham F.C.

== Statistics ==
=== Appearances and goals ===
This is a list of the First Team players for the 2010–11 season. Kagisho Dikgacoi was given the number 26 shirt, previously worn by Chris Smalling, while Carlos Salcido was given the number 3 shirt after the departure of Paul Konchesky. Eiður Guðjohnsen took Fredrik Stoor's number 22 shirt during his loan spell. All the new players filled in a few gaps in the squad.

All Premier League clubs had to declare a squad of 25 players on 1 September 2010, who they could choose from until the transfer window re-opened in January 2011. The squad had to include at least eight senior "homegrown" players, defined as having spent three years in an English football academy before the age of 21. Fulham had 11 senior homegrown players in the official list released by the Premier League, with a further group of contracted players under 21 also available for selection.

No.	Pos	Nat	Player	Total		Premier League		FA Cup		League Cup	
No.	Pos	Nat	Player	Apps	Goals	Apps	Goals	Apps	Goals	Apps	Goals
1	GK	(Australia) AUS	Mark Schwarzer	33	0	31+0	0	1+0	0	1+0	0
2	DF	(Republic of Ireland) IRL	Stephen Kelly	12	0	8+2	0	0+0	0	1+1	0
3	DF	(Mexico) MEX	Carlos Salcido	26	0	22+1	0	2+0	0	1+0	0
4	DF	(Ghana) GHA	John Paintsil	18	0	15+0	0	2+0	0	1+0	0
5	DF	(Norway) NOR	Brede Hangeland	42	7	37+0	6	3+0	1	2+0	0
6	DF	(Northern Ireland) NIR	Chris Baird	31	2	25+4	2	2+0	0	0+0	0
7	MF	(England) ENG	Steve Sidwell	14	2	10+2	2	2+0	0	0+0	0
8	FW	(England) ENG	Andrew Johnson	29	3	15+12	3	2+0	0	0+0	0
11	MF	(Hungary) HUN	Zoltán Gera	32	4	10+17	1	1+2	1	2+0	2
12	GK	(England) ENG	David Stockdale	10	0	7+0	0	2+0	0	1+0	0
13	MF	(England) ENG	Danny Murphy	42	2	37+0	0	3+0	2	2+0	0
14	DF	(Switzerland) SUI	Philippe Senderos	3	0	3+0	0	0+0	0	0+0	0
15	FW	(Senegal) SEN	Diomansy Kamara	11	5	7+3	2	1+0	3	0+0	0
16	MF	(Republic of Ireland) IRL	Damien Duff	27	4	22+2	4	2+0	0	1+0	0
17	MF	(Norway) NOR	Bjørn Helge Riise	3	0	0+3	0	0+0	0	0+0	0
18	DF	(Northern Ireland) NIR	Aaron Hughes	43	1	38+0	1	3+0	0	2+0	0
19	GK	(Switzerland) SUI	Pascal Zuberbühler	0	0	0+0	0	0+0	0	0+0	0
20	MF	(Nigeria) NGR	Dickson Etuhu	31	3	23+5	2	1+0	1	2+0	0
22	FW	(Iceland) ISL	Eiður Guðjohnsen	10	0	4+6	0	0+0	0	0+0	0
23	MF	(United States) USA	Clint Dempsey	42	13	35+2	12	3+0	0	1+1	1
24	FW	(France) FRA	Gaël Kakuta	7	1	2+5	1	0+0	0	0+0	0
25	FW	(England) ENG	Bobby Zamora	16	7	9+5	5	0+1	0	1+0	2
26	MF	(South Africa) RSA	Kagisho Dikgacoi	1	0	0+1	0	0+0	0	0+0	0
27	MF	(England) ENG	Jonathan Greening	14	1	6+4	0	0+2	1	0+2	0
28	DF	(England) ENG	Matthew Briggs	4	0	3+0	0	0+0	0	1+0	0
29	MF	(Wales) WAL	Simon Davies	33	4	25+5	4	1+1	0	1+0	0
30	FW	(Belgium) BEL	Mousa Dembélé	28	5	22+2	3	2+0	1	2+0	1
31	MF	(England) ENG	Matthew Saunders	0	0	0+0	0	0+0	0	0+0	0
32	DF	(Algeria) ALG	Rafik Halliche	2	0	0+1	0	0+1	0	0+0	0
33	FW	(Netherlands) NED	Danny Hoesen	0	0	0+0	0	0+0	0	0+0	0
36	FW	(Finland) FIN	Lauri Dalla Valle	0	0	0+0	0	0+0	0	0+0	0
37	MF	(Sweden) SWE	Alexander Kačaniklić	0	0	0+0	0	0+0	0	0+0	0
38	GK	(Philippines) PHI	Neil Etheridge	0	0	0+0	0	0+0	0	0+0	0
44	FW	(England) ENG	Keanu Marsh-Brown	0	0	0+0	0	0+0	0	0+0	0
45	DF	(England) ENG	Alex Smith	0	0	0+0	0	0+0	0	0+0	0
Players who are no longer playing for Fulham or who have been loaned out in the January transfer window:
3	DF	(England) ENG	Paul Konchesky	1	0	1+0	0	0+0	0	0+0	0
21	FW	(United States) USA	Eddie Johnson	12	0	1+10	0	0+0	0	0+1	0
22	DF	(Sweden) SWE	Fredrik Stoor	0	0	0+0	0	0+0	0	0+0	0
35	FW	(Sweden) SWE	David Elm	0	0	0+0	0	0+0	0	0+0	0

=== Top scorers ===
Includes all competitive matches. The list is sorted by shirt number when total goals are equal.

Last updated on 22 May 2011

Position	Nation	Number	Name	Premier League	FA Cup	League Cup	Total
1	(United States)	23	Clint Dempsey	12	0	1	13
2	(Norway)	5	Brede Hangeland	6	1	0	7
=	(England)	25	Bobby Zamora	5	0	2	7
3	(Senegal)	15	Diomansy Kamara	2	3	0	5
=	(Belgium)	30	Mousa Dembélé	3	1	1	5
4	(Hungary)	11	Zoltán Gera	1	1	2	4
=	(Republic of Ireland)	16	Damien Duff	4	0	0	4
=	(Wales)	29	Simon Davies	4	0	0	4
5	(England)	8	Andy Johnson	3	0	0	3
=	(Nigeria)	20	Dickson Etuhu	2	1	0	3
6	(Northern Ireland)	6	Chris Baird	2	0	0	2
=	(England)	7	Steve Sidwell	2	0	0	2
=	(England)	13	Danny Murphy	0	2	0	2
7	(Northern Ireland)	18	Aaron Hughes	1	0	0	1
=	(France)	24	Gaël Kakuta	1	0	0	1
=	(England)	27	Jonathan Greening	0	1	0	1
/	/	/	Own Goals	1	0	0	1
/	/	/	TOTALS	49	10	6	65

=== Disciplinary record ===
Includes all competitive matches. Players with 1 card or more included only.

Last updated on 22 May 2011

Position	Nation	Number	Name	Premier League		FA Cup		League Cup		Total	
Position	Nation	Number	Name	Y	R	Y	R	Y	R	Y	R
1	(England)	13	Danny Murphy	8	0	0	0	1	0	9	0
2	(Norway)	5	Brede Hangeland	6	0	1	0	0	0	7	0
3	(Northern Ireland)	5	Chris Baird	5	0	1	0	0	0	6	0
=	(Ghana)	4	John Paintsil	6	0	0	0	0	0	6	0
4	(United States)	23	Clint Dempsey	5	0	0	0	0	0	5	0
5	(Republic of Ireland)	16	Damien Duff	3	0	1	0	0	0	4	0
=	(England)	7	Steve Sidwell	4	0	0	0	0	0	4	0
6	(Hungary)	11	Zoltán Gera	2	1	0	0	0	0	2	1
=	(Nigeria)	20	Dickson Etuhu	3	0	0	0	0	0	3	0
=	(England)	8	Andrew Johnson	3	0	0	0	0	0	3	0
=	(Mexico)	30	Carlos Salcido	3	0	0	0	0	0	3	0
7	(England)	25	Bobby Zamora	2	0	0	0	0	0	2	0
=	(England)	27	Jonathan Greening	2	0	0	0	0	0	2	0
8	(Iceland)	22	Eiður Guðjohnsen	1	0	0	0	0	0	1	0

== Transfers ==
=== In ===
Date	Pos.	Name	From	Fee
8 June 2010	DF	(Switzerland) Philippe Senderos	(England) Arsenal	Undisclosed
1 July 2010	MF	(England) Jonathan Greening	(England) West Bromwich Albion	Free
18 August 2010	FW	(Belgium) Mousa Dembélé	(Netherlands) AZ	£5,000,000
24 August 2010	FW	(Algeria) Rafik Halliche	(Portugal) Benfica	Undisclosed
27 August 2010	DF	(Mexico) Carlos Salcido	(Netherlands) PSV	£1,600,000
31 August 2010	FW	(Finland) Lauri Dalla Valle	(England) Liverpool	Swap/cash deal for Paul Konchesky
31 August 2010	MF	(Sweden) Alexander Kačaniklić	(England) Liverpool	Swap/cash deal for Paul Konchesky
6 January 2011	MF	(England) Steve Sidwell	(England) Aston Villa	Undisclosed
31 January 2011	FW	(Iceland) Eiður Guðjohnsen	(England) Stoke City	Loan

=== Out ===
Date	Pos.	Name	To	Fee
9 May 2010	FW	(Italy) Stefano Okaka	(Italy) Roma	End of loan
9 May 2010	DF	(England) Nicky Shorey	(England) Aston Villa	End of loan
26 May 2010	MF	(England) Wayne Brown	(England) Bristol Rovers	Free
1 July 2010	MF	(Germany) Christopher Buchtmann	(Germany) 1. FC Köln	Free
1 July 2010	DF	(England) Chris Smalling	(England) Manchester United	Undisclosed
1 July 2010	FW	(Norway) Erik Nevland	(Norway) Viking	Free
1 July 2010	MF	(Iran) Andranik Teymourian		Released
1 July 2010	DF	(Finland) Toni Kallio		Released
1 July 2010	FW	(Nigeria) Michael Uwezu	(England) Lincoln City	Free
1 July 2010	MF	(England) Stefan Payne	(England) Gillingham	Free
31 August 2010	DF	(England) Paul Konchesky	(England) Liverpool	Cash/swap deal for Lauri Dalla Valle and Alexander Kačaniklić

=== Loan out ===
Date	Pos.	Name	To	Return date
15 Feb	MF	(South Africa) Kagisho Dikgacoi	(England) Crystal Palace	Season Long
4 Feb	MF	(Norway) Bjørn Helge Riise	(England) Sheffield United	Season Long
21 Mar	FW	(Senegal) Diomansy Kamara	(England) Leicester City	Season Long
16 Feb	FW	(Finland) Lauri Dalla Valle	(England) AFC Bournemouth	Season Long
26 Jan	DF	(England) Keanu Marsh-Brown	(England) Milton Keynes Dons	1 Month
31 Jan	FW	(United States) Eddie Johnson	(England) Preston North End	Season Long
