= Irete =

Coordinates: 05°31′N 07°00′E

Irete is a community in Owerri West LGA, Southeastern Nigeria, located near the city of Owerri.
