= Greg Kaziboni =

Zimbabwean association football player (born 1993)

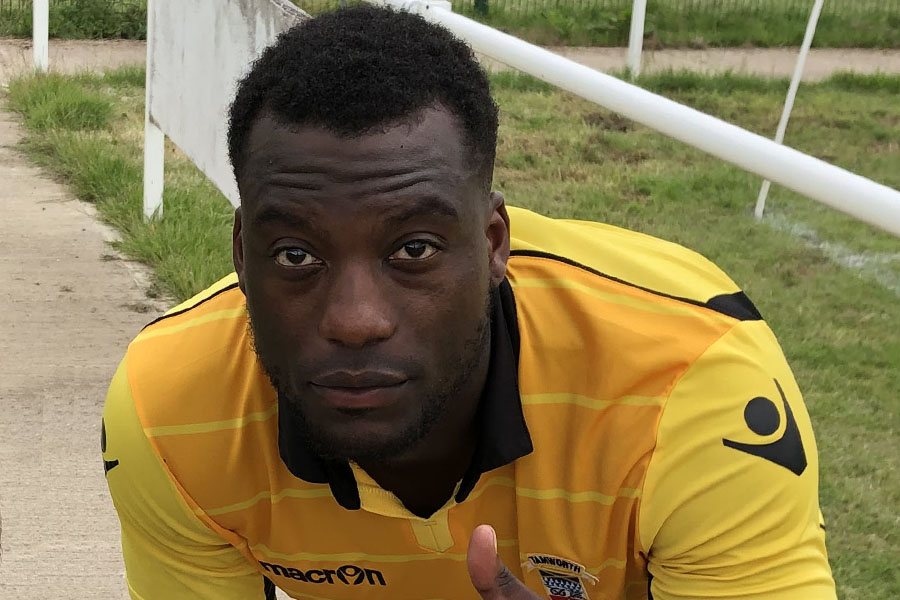
- Kaziboni in July 2019

Personal information
- Full name: Gregory Tonde Kaziboni
- Date of birth: 10 February 1993 (age 33)
- Place of birth: Harare, Zimbabwe
- Height: 1.83 m (6 ft 0 in)
- Position: Midfielder

Team information
- Current team: Barwell

Youth career
- –2008: Gregory Celtic
- 2008–2011: Northampton Town

Senior career*
Years	Team	Apps	(Gls)
2011–2012	Northampton Town	5	(0)
2012–2013	Corby Town	28	(3)
2013	Brackley Town	5	(1)
2013–2014	Rugby Town	21	(2)
2014–2017	Brackley Town	46	(5)
2017–2018	Biggleswade Town	24	(1)
2018–2019	Banbury United	36	(9)
2019–2020	Tamworth	11	(3)
2019–2020	→ AFC Rushden & Diamonds (loan)	5	(1)
2020	→ Banbury United (loan)	5	(1)
2020	Stratford Town	5	(0)
2020–2022	Nuneaton Borough	29	(1)
2022–2025	St Ives Town	64	(5)
2025–	Barwell	0	(0)
- * Club domestic league appearances and goals as of 13:45, 28 March 2025 (UTC)

Gregory Tonde Kaziboni (born 10 February 1993) is a Zimbabwean footballer who plays for Northern Premier League Division One Midlands side Barwell, where he plays as a midfielder.

== Playing career ==
=== Northampton Town ===
Kaziboni was signed by Northampton Town while playing for local amateur side Obelisk United.

Greg was given a squad number in January 2011 and made his Football League debut against Gillingham the same month.

On 28 February 2012, Kaziboni was released from his contract at Northampton Town by manager Aidy Boothroyd.

=== Corby Town ===
Greg joined Conference North side Corby Town on 16 August 2012. joining a team with a number of links to his previous club, as on the same day former colleagues Nathaniel Wedderburn, Liam Richardson and Tom McGowan all signed, although former Northampton Town defender Andy Holt was forced to retire with a knee injury.

Kaziboni went onto make 28 appearances, and scored three goals in what was an extremely disappointing end to the 2012–13 season, as Corby Town finished the season relegated by a single goal, with Histon the fortunate beneficiaries.

=== Brackley Town ===
Greg signed for Brackley Town for the 2013–14 season in 2013, but only made five appearances and scored one goal.

=== Rugby Town ===
In November 2013, Kaziboni signed for Rugby Town, and he made his debut in the club's 3–1 win over Uxbridge.

Greg had a mixed season with Rugby Town netting two goals and left at the end of the season to re-join Brackley Town.

=== Brackley Town ===
Greg re-signed for Conference North side Brackley Town in 2014.

Kaziboni remained with Brackley Town for two seasons, and began the 2017–18 season with the club prior to departing, in total Greg made 46 appearances and scored five goals in the Conference North.

=== Biggleswade Town ===
Kaziboni joined Southern League Premier Division side Biggleswade Town near the beginning of the 2017–18 season, helping the club to secure a 16th-place finish in the division.

=== Banbury United ===
In the summer of 2018, Greg signed for Southern League Premier Central side Banbury United on a one-year contract.

Kaziboni made his Southern League Premier Central debut for Banbury United on 11 August 2018, the opening day of the season. The club drew 1–1 in an away fixture with Rushall Olympic.

It was confirmed on 24 May 2019 that Kaziboni would leave Banbury United on the expiry of his contract. During his time with the club Kaziboni made 36 appearances and scored 9 goals in the Southern League Premier Central, as well as 3 appearances and 1 goal in the FA Cup, 3 appearances and 2 goals in the FA Trophy as well as an appearance and a goal in the final of the Oxfordshire Senior Cup, which Banbury United lost 4–3 to Oxford City.

=== Tamworth ===
On 2 June 2019, Kaziboni signed a one-year contract with Southern League Premier Central side Tamworth.

Following an injury lay off from pre-season, he made his debut on 31 August 2019, in an away fixture against Hitchin Town, scoring a brace in a 3–0 victory for the away side. Kaziboni added a third goal to his tally for the club on 14 September 2019, in his third match, a 3–0 victory against Redditch United.

=== AFC Rushden & Diamonds (loan) ===
On 30 December 2019, it was announced that Kaziboni had joined Southern League Premier Division Central rivals AFC Rushden & Diamonds on a months loan, in a bid to get some regular first team football.

Greg made his debut for AFC Rushden & Diamonds on 1 January 2020 in a Southern League Premier Division Central away fixture with St Ives Town, helping his new club to a 4–3 victory.

Kaziboni scored his first goal in an AFC Rushden & Diamonds shirt on 11 January 2020, scoring the equaliser in a Southern League Premier Division Central 3–2 away victory against Leiston.

=== Banbury United (loan) ===
On 31 January 2020, Kaziboni rejoined Southern League Premier Division Central side Banbury United on a months loan.

Greg made his second debut for the club the following day, as his new side lost narrowly 1–0 at home to Bromsgrove Sporting.

=== Stratford Town ===
Greg signed for Southern League Premier Division Central side Stratford Town on 21 June 2020.

=== Nuneaton Borough ===
On 30 May 2022, Kaziboni, along with Chris Clements and Anthony Dwyer were released by Nuneaton Borough following the conclusion of the 2021–22 season.

=== St Ives Town ===
On 24 July 2022, Kaziboni along with compatriot Wilson Chingoka, and Jordan Williams were all confirmed as signing for Southern League Premier Division Central side St Ives Town.

=== Barwell ===
On 27 March 2025, Kaziboni signed for Barwell.

== Career statistics ==
=== Club ===
As of match played 25 March 2025

Appearances and goals by club, season and competition
Club	Season	League			National Cup		League Cup		Other		Total	
Club	Season	Division	Apps	Goals	Apps	Goals	Apps	Goals	Apps	Goals	Apps	Goals
Northampton Town	2010–11	League Two	2	0	0	0	0	0	0	0	2	0
Northampton Town	2011–12	League Two	3	0	0	0	0	0	0	0	3	0
Northampton Town	Northampton Town		5	0	0	0	0	0	0	0	5	0
Corby Town	2012–13	Conference North	28	3	1	0	—		2 (Note: Two appearances in the FA Trophy)	0	31	3
Brackley Town	2013–14	Conference North	5	1	0	0	—		0	0	5	1
Rugby Town	2013–14	Southern Football League Division One Central	21	2	0	0	—		2 (Note: One appearance in the Birmingham Senior Cup and one in the Southern League Division One Central play-offs)	0	23	2
Brackley Town	2014–15	Conference North	34	5	0	0	—		0	0	34	5
Brackley Town	2015–16	National League North	11	0	0	0	—		0	0	11	0
Brackley Town	2017–18	National League North	1	0	1	0	—		0	0	2	0
Brackley Town	Brackley Town		51	6	1	0	0	0	0	0	52	6
Biggleswade Town	2017–18	Southern League Premier Division	24	1	0	0	—		0	0	24	1
Banbury United	2018–19	Southern League Premier Central	36	9	3	1	—		4	2	43	13
Tamworth	2019–20	Southern League Premier Central	11	3	4	0	—		2 (Note: One appearance in FA Trophy and one appearance in Birmingham Senior Cup)	0	17	3
AFC Rushden & Diamonds (loan)	2019–20	Southern League Premier Central	5	1	0	0	—		0	0	5	1
Banbury United (loan)	2019–20	Southern League Premier Central	5	1	0	0	—		0	0	5	1
Stratford Town	2020–21	Southern League Premier Central	5	0	2	0	—		0	0	7	0
Nuneaton Borough	2020–21	Southern League Premier Central	4	1	0	0	—		2 (Note: Two appearances in FA Trophy)	0	6	1
Nuneaton Borough	2021–22	Southern League Premier Central	25	0	0	0	—		5 (Note: Three appearance in Birmingham Senior Cup and two appearances in FA Trophy)	0	30	0
St Ives Town	2022–23	Southern League Premier Central	25	1	3	0	—		2 (Note: One appearance in FA Trophy and one appearance in Huntingdonshire Senior Cup)	0	30	1
St Ives Town	2023–24	Southern League Premier Central	21	2	1	1	—		1 (Note: One appearance, one goal in Huntingdonshire Senior Cup)	1	23	4
St Ives Town	2024–25	Southern League Premier Central	18	2	3	0	—		2 (Note: One appearance in FA Trophy, one appearance in Huntingdonshire Senior Cup)	0	23	2
Career total			263	32	18	2	0	0	18	3	299	38

== Honours ==
=== Club ===
Brackley Town

- Northamptonshire Senior Cup: 2014–15
