= Leon Best =

Footballer (born 1986)

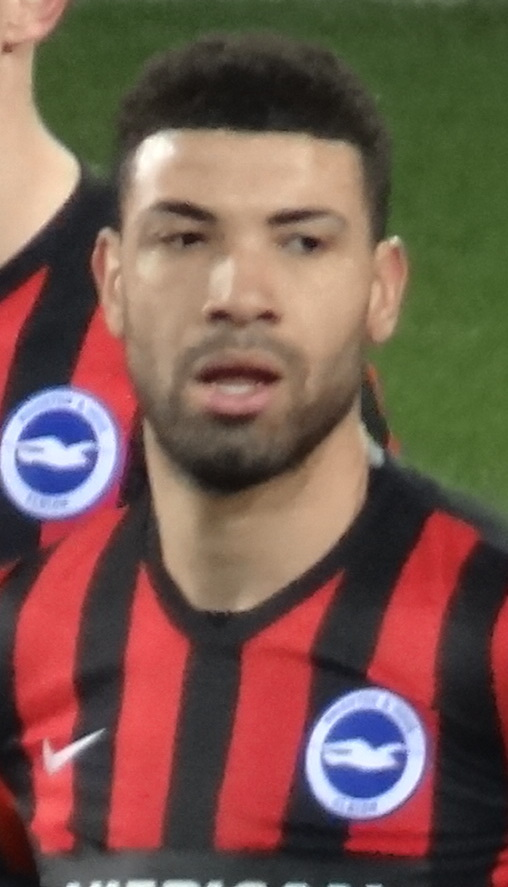
- Best playing for Brighton & Hove Albion in 2015

Personal information
- Full name: Leon Julian Brendan Best
- Date of birth: 19 September 1986 (age 40)
- Place of birth: Nottingham, England
- Height: 1.85 m (6 ft 1 in)
- Position: Striker

Youth career
- 2002–2004: Notts County Lourdes Celtic

Senior career*
| Years | Team | Apps | (Gls) |
| 2004–2007 | Southampton | 15 | (4) |
| 2004–2005 | → Queens Park Rangers (loan) | 5 | (0) |
| 2005 | → Sheffield Wednesday (loan) | 2 | (1) |
| 2006 | → Sheffield Wednesday (loan) | 11 | (1) |
| 2006 | → AFC Bournemouth (loan) | 15 | (3) |
| 2006–2007 | → Yeovil Town (loan) | 15 | (10) |
| 2007–2010 | Coventry City | 92 | (19) |
| 2010–2012 | Newcastle United | 42 | (10) |
| 2012–2015 | Blackburn Rovers | 14 | (2) |
| 2014 | → Sheffield Wednesday (loan) | 15 | (4) |
| 2014–2015 | → Derby County (loan) | 15 | (0) |
| 2015 | → Brighton & Hove Albion (loan) | 13 | (0) |
| 2015–2016 | Rotherham United | 16 | (4) |
| 2016–2017 | Ipswich Town | 11 | (0) |
| 2017–2018 | Charlton Athletic | 5 | (0) |
| Total | | 286 | (58) |

International career^{‡}
| 2002 | Republic of Ireland U17 | 2 | (0) |
| 2005 | Republic of Ireland U19 | 1 | (1) |
| 2008 | Republic of Ireland U21 | 1 | (0) |
| 2009–2010 | Republic of Ireland | 7 | (0) |
- * Club domestic league appearances and goals as of 20:25, 1 January 2018 (UTC) ‡ National team caps and goals as of 20:17, 10 March 2016 (UTC)

Leon Julian Brendan Best (born 19 September 1986) is a retired professional footballer who played as a striker. He has played for the Republic of Ireland national football team. Best represented Ireland at under-21 level and won his first full international cap against Nigeria on 29 May 2009.

Best had a youth career at Notts County. His first professional club was then Premier League club Southampton. He has also played for Coventry City and Newcastle United before his 2012 move to Blackburn Rovers, where he remained for three years before leaving by mutual consent. He has since taken up short spells with Rotherham United, Ipswich Town and Charlton Athletic.

== Early life ==
Best was born on 19 September 1986 in Nottingham, England. He opted to play football for his mother's country, Ireland, while in his teens.

== Club career ==
=== Southampton ===
As a young player, Best started his career at Notts County before being signed as a trainee by then Premier League club Southampton. He made his professional debut against Newcastle United on his 18th birthday in 2004. A loan spell at Queens Park Rangers followed later in the 2004–05 season.

He was a member of Southampton's youth team that reached the final of the FA Youth Cup in 2005, losing on aggregate to Ipswich Town.

Best also had two loan spells at Sheffield Wednesday in the 2005–06 season, scoring his first professional goal and Wednesday's first of the season on 9 August 2005 at Hillsborough against Hull City. The first loan spell was cut short in the same match when Best broke his foot and returned to St. Mary's after only 5 days in Sheffield. After recovering with Southampton, Best then returned to Hillsborough at the end of the January transfer window (though there was also speculation he would go to Crystal Palace) where he remained until the end of the season, scoring Wednesday's last goal of the season at Derby County on 30 April 2006.

On 3 August 2006 Best joined Football League One club AFC Bournemouth on a month-long loan deal with an option to extend his stay. He returned to Southampton at the end of October at the end of the maximum 3-month loan spell, having made 15 league appearances, scoring 3 goals.

On 23 November 2006, he joined his teammate Martin Cranie on loan to Yeovil Town until 22 February 2007.

After his loan spells, Best returned to play a role in Southampton's qualification for the Championship play-offs, where they faced Derby County. He came on as a substitute in the first leg at St Marys, which Southampton lost 2–1. In the second leg Best started alongside on-loan striker Marek Saganowski. The game ended in a tie on aggregate, with Best scoring an own goal which levelled the score at 2–2 on the night. Southampton lost 4–3 in the ensuing penalty shootout, with Best missing the opening penalty.

=== Coventry City ===
On 5 July 2007, he joined Coventry City for a fee of £650,000 decided by a tribunal, with the fee increasing were Coventry to gain promotion to the Premiership by 2010. Following a cheekbone fracture at the end of 2008, Best took his place in the team wearing a protective mask. His return led him scoring three goals in successive matches and consequently gaining a reputation for wearing a "Besty" mask, even after he had recovered from his injury and earning the nickname "Zorro". His distinctive mask became somewhat of a talisman for Coventry City fans, many of whom took to wearing similar masks in the stands as a tribute to Best. On 3 October 2009 he was named Championship Player of the Month for September.

=== Newcastle United ===
He signed for Newcastle United on 1 February 2010 for a fee of £1,500,000 on a three-and-a-half-year contract. Best made his debut against Cardiff City at St James' Park on 5 February 2010. Best failed to make an impact in his first season at Newcastle as he failed to find a goal and was put behind on form strike duo Andy Carroll and Peter Løvenkrands.

Best netted his first goal for Newcastle in a pre-season friendly against Carlisle United on 17 July 2010, followed by his second goal for the club in the pre-season Sir Bobby Robson tribute match against PSV Eindhoven on 31 July 2010. However Best then received a cruciate injury during pre-season causing him to miss the first few months of the 2010–11 season. He was back in light training by the end of September and was on the bench for Newcastle's 1–1 draw with Chelsea on 28 November, but did not make an appearance. He made his comeback in Newcastle's 1–0 victory against Wigan Athletic on 2 January 2011, appearing as a late substitute for Shola Ameobi. Best made his first Premier League start for Newcastle in a home 5–0 win against West Ham United on 5 January 2011, scoring a hat-trick in the process, his first league goals for the club. He was injured prior to the Stoke away game on 19 March and was ruled out until the end of the season. However, Best had scored six goals in 10 starts.

On 28 August 2011, he scored two goals against Fulham to give Newcastle a 2–1 victory followed by the equalizer in the 1–1 draw with Aston Villa, extending the Magpies unbeaten run to eight games in the English Premier League.

Best then ended a run of 12 games without a goal by scoring the winner in Newcastle's 1–0 win over Queens Park Rangers.

=== Blackburn Rovers ===
On 2 July 2012, Best signed for Blackburn Rovers on a four-year contract for a fee of more than £3 million. Less than a month after signing for Blackburn Rovers, he suffered an injury to his anterior cruciate ligaments, ruling him out for at least six months.

Best scored his first league goal in the 89th minute, when he volleyed in a Chris Taylor cross for Blackburn when he came on as a first-half substitute for the injured Ruben Rochina in a 1–1 draw with Derby County at Pride Park on 4 August 2013.

Best was released by Rovers on 8 July 2015 by mutual consent.

==== Loan spells ====
On 14 February 2014, he was loaned out by Rovers to their SkyBet Championship rivals Sheffield Wednesday, this was to be his third spell with the Yorkshire club having previously been on loan at Hillsborough in 2005 and 2006. He scored his first goal in his third spell at the club in a 2–1 FA Cup defeat to Charlton Athletic on 24 February 2014. On 14 March 2014, Best extended his loan with the Owls until the end of the 2013–14 season. Best scored his first league goal of his third spell with the owls on 15 March 2014, helping with a 4–1 victory over Birmingham City.

On 4 August 2014, Best was sent to Derby County on a season-long loan. He returned to Blackburn at the end of his loan spell with Derby before joining Brighton & Hove Albion on loan. He made thirteen appearances without scoring for Brighton before returning to Blackburn.

=== Rotherham United ===
Best joined Rotherham United on 16 November 2015 until the end of the season.

On 12 March 2016, Best led an astonishing fight back against promotion chasing Derby County at New York Stadium. Coming on as a second-half substitute with his team losing 3–0, he saw his teammate Danny Ward score in the 82nd minute then scored two goals in the 88th and 90th minutes. On 3 June 2016, Best left the club, having failed to agree terms on a new contract.

=== Ipswich Town ===
Best joined Ipswich Town on 30 August 2016 on a one-year contract, as a replacement for the outgoing Daryl Murphy. He struggled to keep his place in the team, and following his performance on 17 January 2017 in an FA Cup tie against non-league Lincoln City, where Ipswich were beaten 1–0, Mick McCarthy stated that Best would never play for Ipswich Town again. "I told him after the Lincoln game that he is not part of my plans here. He's still with us and may have to have something done with his groin. We will see but he won't be playing for us."

He was released by Ipswich Town at the end of the 2016–17 season. He made just 12 appearances and scored no goals.

=== Charlton Athletic ===
On 28 November 2017, Charlton Athletic announced the signing of Best on a two-month contract. He made 5 appearances for Charlton, with it being cut short due to a knee injury sustained on New Year's Day. He was released in January after his contract expired, although he remained at the club so he could recover from his injury. He has been without a club since.

== International career ==
Best qualifies to play for the Republic of Ireland through his mother, who is from Bluebell, Dublin. He also lived in Dublin from the age of seven. He played for Lourdes Celtic before returning to Nottingham.

Having already represented the Republic of Ireland firstly at under-17 level in 2002 and later at under-21 level in 2008, Best was called up to the Republic of Ireland senior squad for the first time for the games against Nigeria and then the 2010 FIFA World Cup qualifier against Bulgaria in May 2009. He made his debut on 29 May against Nigeria in a match that finished in a 1–1 draw.

== Personal life ==
Best's sister had a baby with Jamaica international footballer, Wes Morgan.

== Career statistics ==
=== Club ===
As of match played 1 January 2018

Appearances and goals by club, season and competition
| Club | Season | League | | | FA Cup | | League Cup | | Other | | Total | |
| Club | Season | Division | Apps | Goals | Apps | Goals | Apps | Goals | Apps | Goals | Apps | Goals |
|---|---|---|---|---|---|---|---|---|---|---|---|---|
| Southampton | 2004–05 | Premier League | 3 | 0 | 0 | 0 | 2 | 0 | — | | 5 | 0 |
| Southampton | 2005–06 | Championship | 3 | 0 | 0 | 0 | 0 | 0 | — | | 3 | 0 |
| Southampton | 2006–07 | Championship | 9 | 4 | 0 | 0 | 0 | 0 | 2 (Note: Appearances in Football League Championship play-offs) | 0 | 11 | 4 |
| Southampton | Total | | 15 | 4 | 0 | 0 | 2 | 0 | 2 | 0 | 21 | 4 |
| Queens Park Rangers (loan) | 2004–05 | Championship | 5 | 0 | 0 | 0 | 0 | 0 | — | | 5 | 0 |
| Sheffield Wednesday (loan) | 2005–06 | Championship | 13 | 2 | 0 | 0 | 0 | 0 | — | | 13 | 2 |
| AFC Bournemouth (loan) | 2006–07 | League One | 15 | 3 | 0 | 0 | 1 | 0 | 1 (Note: Appearance in Football League Trophy) | 0 | 17 | 3 |
| Yeovil Town (loan) | 2006–07 | League One | 15 | 10 | 0 | 0 | 0 | 0 | 0 | 0 | 15 | 10 |
| Coventry City | 2007–08 | Championship | 34 | 8 | 3 | 0 | 3 | 1 | — | | 40 | 9 |
| Coventry City | 2008–09 | Championship | 31 | 2 | 4 | 2 | 0 | 0 | — | | 35 | 4 |
| Coventry City | 2009–10 | Championship | 27 | 9 | 2 | 1 | 0 | 0 | — | | 29 | 10 |
| Coventry City | Total | | 92 | 19 | 9 | 3 | 3 | 1 | — | | 104 | 23 |
| Newcastle United | 2009–10 | Championship | 13 | 0 | 0 | 0 | 0 | 0 | — | | 13 | 0 |
| Newcastle United | 2010–11 | Premier League | 11 | 6 | 1 | 0 | 0 | 0 | — | | 12 | 6 |
| Newcastle United | 2011–12 | Premier League | 18 | 4 | 2 | 0 | 1 | 0 | — | | 21 | 4 |
| Newcastle United | Total | | 42 | 10 | 3 | 0 | 1 | 0 | — | | 46 | 10 |
| Blackburn Rovers | 2012–13 | Championship | 6 | 0 | 2 | 0 | 0 | 0 | — | | 8 | 0 |
| Blackburn Rovers | 2013–14 | Championship | 8 | 2 | 0 | 0 | 0 | 0 | — | | 8 | 2 |
| Blackburn Rovers | 2014–15 | Championship | 0 | 0 | 0 | 0 | 0 | 0 | — | | 0 | 0 |
| Blackburn Rovers | Total | | 14 | 2 | 2 | 0 | 0 | 0 | — | | 16 | 2 |
| Sheffield Wednesday (loan) | 2013–14 | Championship | 15 | 4 | 1 | 1 | 0 | 0 | — | | 16 | 5 |
| Derby County (loan) | 2014–15 | Championship | 15 | 0 | 1 | 0 | 4 | 0 | — | | 20 | 0 |
| Brighton & Hove Albion (loan) | 2014–15 | Championship | 13 | 0 | 0 | 0 | 0 | 0 | — | | 13 | 0 |
| Rotherham United | 2015–16 | Championship | 16 | 4 | 0 | 0 | 0 | 0 | — | | 16 | 4 |
| Ipswich Town | 2016–17 | Championship | 11 | 0 | 1 | 0 | 0 | 0 | — | | 12 | 0 |
| Charlton Athletic | 2017–18 | League One | 5 | 0 | 1 | 0 | 0 | 0 | 1 (Note: Appearance in EFL Trophy) | 0 | 7 | 0 |
| Career total | | | 286 | 58 | 18 | 4 | 11 | 1 | 4 | 0 | 319 | 63 |

=== International ===
As of match played 2 March 2010

Appearances and goals by national team and year
| National team | Year | Apps | Goals |
|---|---|---|---|
| Republic of Ireland | 2009 | 6 | 0 |
| Republic of Ireland | 2010 | 1 | 0 |
| Total | | 7 | 0 |

== Honours ==
Newcastle United

- Football League Championship: 2009–10

Individual

- Football League Championship Player of the Month: September 2009

== See also ==
- List of Republic of Ireland international footballers born outside the Republic of Ireland
