= Faysal El Idrissi =

Footballer (born 1977)

Personal information
- Full name: Fayçal Moustapha El Idrissi
- Date of birth: 16 November 1977 (age 48)
- Place of birth: Lille, France
- Height: 1.72 m (5 ft 8 in)
- Position: Midfielder

Youth career
- –1997: Lille

Senior career*
Years	Team	Apps	(Gls)
1997–1999	Excelsior Mouscron	45	(8)
2000	Santa Clara	18	(3)
2000–2002	FC Groningen	13	(0)
2002–2003	SK Ronse	29	(10)
2003–2005	1. FC Saarbrücken	65	(8)
2006	Al-Nasr		
2006	Coventry City	1	(0)
2006	FC Luzern	18	(3)
2008–2010	R.F.C. Tournai		
2010–2011	SV Elversberg	27	(3)
2011–?	Fujairah SC		

International career
2004–2006	Morocco	5	(0)
- * Club domestic league appearances and goals

Mustapha Faysal El Idrissi (born 16 November 1977) is a former professional footballer who played as a midfielder. Born in France, he represented Morocco at international level.

== Career ==
El Idrissi signed for Coventry City at the start of the 2006–07 season on a trial basis, but he was not signed to a permanent deal despite featuring in the first team. El Idrissi also had a trial at Bristol City, but was not offered a contract.

On 15 January 2008, he signed a contract with FC Luzern after one year away from football. On 1 September 2008, he moved to R.F.C. Tournai.
