= Matthew Saunders =

English footballer

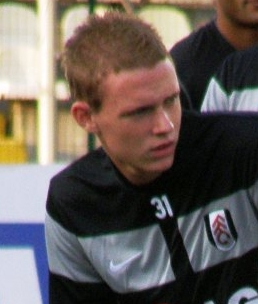

Personal information
- Full name: Matthew Saunders
- Date of birth: 12 September 1989 (age 37)
- Place of birth: Chertsey, England
- Height: 1.80 m (5 ft 11 in)
- Position: Midfielder

Team information
- Current team: Woking (first team coach)

Youth career
- –2009: Fulham

Senior career*
Years	Team	Apps	(Gls)
2009–2011	Fulham	0	(0)
2010	→ Lincoln City (loan)	18	(3)
2012–2014	Dagenham & Redbridge	41	(4)
2014	Whitehawk	1	(0)
2014	Dover Athletic	1	(0)
2014–2015	Hemel Hempstead Town	10	(0)
2015	Aldershot Town	8	(0)
2016–2018	Hemel Hempstead Town	44	(3)
2019	Wealdstone	0	(0)
Total		123	(10)

Managerial career
- 2021–2024: Wealdstone (assistant)
- 2024–2025: Notts County (assistant)
- 2025: Bracknell Town
- * Club domestic league appearances and goals as of 21:26, 11 February 2021 (UTC)

Matthew Saunders (born 12 September 1989) is a retired professional English footballer who played as a midfielder. He is currently the First Team Coach at National League club Woking.

== Playing career ==
Saunders graduated from Fulham's academy. Despite never making an official first team appearance, he spent pre-season 2009 with the first team squad as they toured Australia, making three appearances.

On 1 January 2010, he joined League Two club Lincoln City on a one-month loan deal along with teammate Michael Uwezu. He made his professional debut a day later, on 2 January, for Lincoln in their 4–0 away loss to Bolton Wanderers in the FA Cup Third Round. Saunders returned to Fulham on 1 February 2010, after appearing twice for Lincoln in the league. Saunders later rejoined Lincoln City on loan and made a total of 18 appearances for the Imps, scoring three goals, including a brace against Hereford United and scored against Northampton Town in the next game. After one season at Fulham, Saunders failed to make a single appearance for Fulham and at the end of the 2010–11 season, he was released.

On 10 February 2012, Saunders joined League Two side Dagenham & Redbridge on an 18-month contract. Just four days later since joining the club, he made his debut in a 2–1 loss against Oxford United. On 28 February 2012, he made a start against Morecambe and he set up a goal for Medy Elito to put Dagenham in the lead and eventually won 2–1. Soon after, Saunders scored his first goal, from a free-kick, in a 1–0 win over Bradford City. After the game, Manager John Still praised Saunders performance and said "The goal was worthy of winning a very tight game. It was a fantastic goal. He's got terrific quality. He was a player we wanted to sign at the start of the season, but he got injured. At the moment it's okay, but between now and the end of the season there will be tough games and we have to maintain this level of performance. We're on decent form and we just have to maintain that and, if we do, there are enough games for us to get points from."

Towards the end of the season, Saunders was used less after suffering an ankle injury and made only five appearances. The next season for Saunders role in midfield increased. On 6 November 2011, Saunders provided a double assist for Sam Williams and Luke Wilkinson, who scored a winner, in a 3–2 win over Oxford United and on 1 December, he scored his first of the season in a 2–1 loss against Torquay United. After the game, Saunders said he expected to score and said: "I feel in previous games I've come close to scoring with a few strikes and it was a relief to be honest to get on the scoresheet, Hopefully now I've got one I'll start to get a few more. When you score and don't get anything out of the game it kind of gets forgotten but if it's a goal that gets you a point or a goal which wins a game or helps win a game, you get more recognition for it." That did happen when followed up by his second on 5 January 2013, in a match against Accrington Stanley and set up a goal for Luke Howell in a 2–0 win. Three days after scoring his second, Saunders, along with Elito, signed a new contract, keeping both Saunders and Elito until 2016.

In May 2014, Saunders departed Dagenham & Redbridge by mutual consent, a year before his original contract expiry date. He then moved to Whitehawk, making two appearances before cancelling his contract to sign for Conference side Dover Athletic in September 2014.

On 1 October 2014, Dover announced Saunders had been released by mutual consent to travel to India to play football. In November 2014, he signed for Hemel Hempstead Town, making his debut on 22 November against Basingstoke Town. Saunders went on to make five appearances before agreeing a deal until the end of the season with Conference Premier club Aldershot Town.

In July 2019, Saunders signed for Wealdstone in the National League South.

== Coaching career ==
Saunders didn't make a single league appearance at Wealdstone, instead taking up a role on the coaching staff and with the Wealdstone academy. In October 2020 it was announced that he had been cut from the Wealdstone coaching in order to add to the playing budget. Following the departure of manager Dean Brennan, Saunders was temporarily reappointed to the coaching staff, before being permanently appointed as Stuart Maynard's assistant manager on 11 March 2021.

On 18 January 2024, Saunders left Wealdstone alongside Maynard as the duo were appointed by League Two club Notts County, Saunders taking the role of assistant head coach. On 24 January 2025, he departed the club by mutual agreement.

On 12 September 2025, Saunders was appointed manager of Bracknell Town. The following month he resigned after only one point from six league games.

In August 2026, Saunders joined Woking in a first team coach role alongside interim managers, Craig Ross and Jake Hyde.

== Career statistics ==
Appearances and goals by club, season and competition
Club	Season	League			FA Cup		League Cup		Other		Total	
Club	Season	Division	Apps	Goals	Apps	Goals	Apps	Goals	Apps	Goals	Apps	Goals
Lincoln City (loan)	2009–10	League Two	18	3	1	0	—		—		19	3
Dagenham & Redbridge	2011–12	League Two	5	1	—		—		—		5	1
Dagenham & Redbridge	2012–13	League Two	32	3	1	0	0	0	1 (Note: Appearances in Football League Trophy)	0	34	3
Dagenham & Redbridge	2013–14	League Two	4	0	0	0	0	0	2	0	6	0
Dagenham & Redbridge	Total		41	4	1	0	0	0	3	0	45	4
Whitehawk	2014–15	Conference South	1	0	—		—		—		1	0
Dover Athletic	2014–15	Conference Premier	1	0	—		—		—		1	0
Hemel Hempstead Town	2014–15	Conference South	10	0	—		—		3 (Note: Appearances in FA Trophy)	0	13	0
Aldershot Town	2014–15	Conference Premier	8	0	—		—		—		8	0
Hemel Hempstead Town	2015–16	National League South	1	0	—		—		—		1	0
Hemel Hempstead Town	2016–17	National League South	29	3	6	0	—		2	0	37	3
Hemel Hempstead Town	2017–18	National League South	14	0	0	0	—		1 (Note: Appearances in National League South play-offs)	0	15	0
Hemel Hempstead Town	Total		44	3	6	0	—		3	0	53	3
Career totals			123	10	8	0	0	0	9	0	140	10
