= Rafa (footballer, born 1970) =

Spanish footballer and coach

Personal information
- Full name: Rafael González Robles
- Date of birth: 25 October 1970 (age 56)
- Place of birth: Avilés, Spain
- Height: 1.93 m (6 ft 4 in)
- Position: Goalkeeper

Youth career
- Avilés

Senior career*
Years	Team	Apps	(Gls)
1990–1992	Avilés	28	(0)
1992–1997	Oviedo	6	(0)
1997–2003	Málaga	75	(0)
2003–2004	Cultural Leonesa	37	(0)
2004–2005	Sporting Gijón	3	(0)
2005–2006	Oviedo	8	(0)
2006–2007	Coventry City	0	(0)
Total		157	(0)

International career
1991	Spain U23	3	(0)
- * Club domestic league appearances and goals

Rafael González Robles (born 25 October 1970), commonly known as Rafa, is a Spanish former footballer who played as a goalkeeper.

11 of his professional seasons were spent at Oviedo and Málaga, but he only served as backup for ten of those. After retiring, he became a goalkeeper's coach, notably in England.

== Football career ==
Born in Avilés, Asturias, Rafa started his career at Real Avilés Industrial in Segunda División. After the team's 1992 relegation, he moved to one of the biggest clubs in the region, Real Oviedo, but spent five seasons there (always in La Liga) without making more than three league appearances.

In the summer of 1997, Rafa joined Málaga CF, again meeting the same fate. However, he did appear in 31 games in his second year as the Andalusians promoted from Segunda División B to the top flight in only two years.

Rafa retired from football in 2007, after having played one season each for Cultural y Deportiva Leonesa, Sporting de Gijón, Oviedo (the club was now in Tercera División) and England's Coventry City. Previously, in the 2005 summer, he had an unsuccessful trial with Walsall, before securing a four-month contract at the Football League Championship team.

Following his retirement, Robles was immediately hired by another team in the country of his last club, joining Aston Villa as its goalkeeping coach in August 2007. He remained there until 2012, working with both the first team and academy's goalkeepers.

On 11 February 2013, Rafa joined the New York Red Bulls as goalkeeper coach.

== Honours ==
Málaga

- UEFA Intertoto Cup: 2002
