= Michael Uwezu =

Nigerian footballer

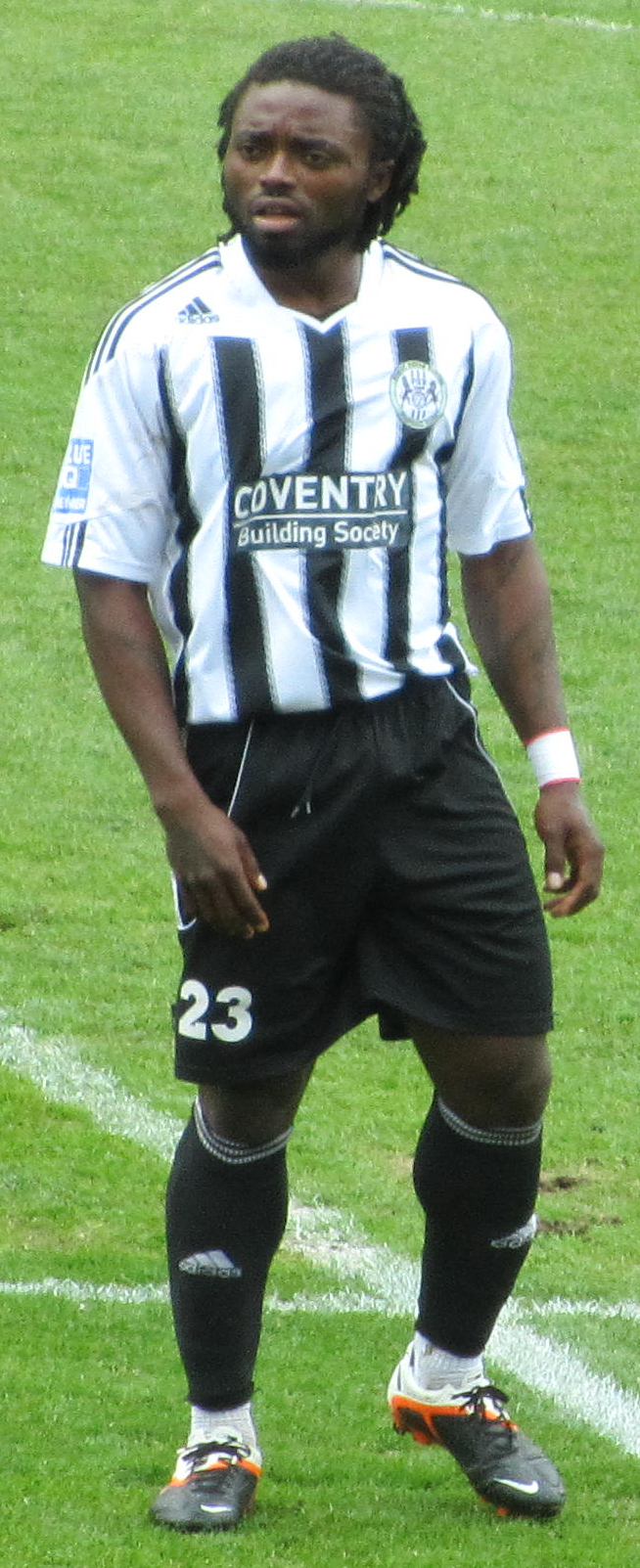
- Uwezu playing for Forest Green Rovers in 2012

Personal information
- Date of birth: 12 December 1990 (age 35)
- Place of birth: Mburubu Kingdom, Enugu, Nigeria
- Position: Striker

Team information
- Current team: Lydd Town

Youth career
- Arsenal
- ?–2009: Fulham

Senior career*
Years	Team	Apps	(Gls)
2009–2010	Fulham	0	(0)
2010	→ Lincoln City (loan)	2	(0)
2010	Lincoln City	0	(0)
2010	Dulwich Hamlet		
2010–2011	Northampton Town	4	(1)
2011–2012	Forest Green Rovers	25	(2)
2014–2015	Thamesmead Town	6	(1)
2016–2018	FC Linköping City	65	(27)
2020–2021	East Grinstead Town	16	(3)
2021–2022	Burgess Hill Town	14	(4)
2022–2023	Ashford United	1	(0)
2023–2024	Haywards Heath Town	15	(7)
2024– 2025 2026 - saltwood FC	Lydd Town	0	(0)
- * Club domestic league appearances and goals as of 20:54, 21 April 2024 (UTC)

Michael Uwezu // (born 12 December 1990) is a Nigerian footballer who plays for Lydd Town. He began his career at Fulham and has also played for Lincoln City, Forest Green Rovers and FC Linköping City in Sweden.

== Career ==
=== Early career ===
Born in Mburubu, Enugu State, Uwezu began his career with Arsenal's academy before moving to their London rivals Fulham. Michael can play wide or as a central striker and signed his first professional contract with Fulham at the end of the 2008–09 season after scoring 11 goals in 18 games for the Academy Under-18s that season.

=== Fulham ===
At the beginning of the 2009–10 season, Uwezu was given the number 40 shirt. He was an unused substitute three times for Fulham's Europa League group matches against CSKA Sofia (home and away), and FC Basel (away).

He was sent on a month loan to Lincoln City on 1 January 2010, along with Matthew Saunders. He made his first senior appearance and debut the following day in a 4–0 loss to Bolton Wanderers in the FA Cup third round, coming on as a substitute for Lenell John-Lewis.

Uwezu returned to Fulham on 1 February 2010, after appearing twice for Lincoln in the league and once in the FA Cup. He then continued his good form for Fulham's reserve side, scoring two goals in four games towards the end of the season, and this form was good enough for him to be given a trial at Carlisle United, with an eye to a loan move for the 2010–11 season. On 1 July 2010, Fulham announced that Uwezu had been released from his contract with Fulham. He made no senior appearances for the club.

=== Forest Green Rovers ===
On 6 August 2011, Uwezu featured as a trialist for Forest Green Rovers in a 2–1 win over Gloucester City. And on 3 November 2011, Uwezu signed a short-term contract with Forest Green. Uwezu made his Forest Green debut on 5 November 2011 coming on as a substitute in Forest Green's home win over Alfreton Town.

On 6 January 2012, Uwezu signed an extended contract at The New Lawn after impressing in his first two months with the club. On 3 March 2012, Uwezu scored his first goal for Forest Green in a 2–1 home win against Cambridge United. At the end of the season Uwezu was released by Forest Green.

=== Thamesmead Town ===
In the 2014–15 season Uwezu played for Thamesmead Town in the Isthmian League Division One North.

=== FC Linköping City ===
In 2016, Uwezu moved abroad for the first time in his career, signing with Swedish fourth-tier club FC Linköping City. He played 65 league games for the club, scoring 27 goals and occasionally captaining the side, before leaving at the end of the 2018 season.

=== East Grinstead Town ===
Uwezu joined Isthmian League side East Grinstead Town in January 2020.

=== Burgess Hill Town ===
Uwezu joined Burgess Hill Town in August 2021.

=== Ashford United ===
In May 2022, Uwezu joined Ashford United. He made one league appearance for the club, as a late substitute in a 1–0 win at Burgess Hill Town on 13 August.

=== Haywards Heath Town ===
Later in the 2022-23 season, Uwezu moved on to Haywards Heath Town, where he made seven league appearances, scoring three goals, as the club were relegated from the Isthmian League; he stayed with the club for the following season in the Southern Combination League, adding eight league appearances and four more goals.

=== Lydd Town ===
Uwezu joined Lydd Town at the start of the 2024-25 season.

== Career statistics ==
Club performance			League		Cup		League Cup		Continental		Total	
Season	Club	League	Apps	Goals	Apps	Goals	Apps	Goals	Apps	Goals	Apps	Goals
England			League		FA Cup		League Cup		Europe		Total	
2009–10	Fulham	Premier League	0	0	0	0	0	0	0	0	0	0
2009–10	Lincoln City	League Two	2	0	1	0	0	0	-		3	0
2010–11	Northampton Town	League Two	4	1	0	0	0	0	-		4	1
2011–12	Forest Green Rovers	Conference Premier	25	2	0	0	0	0	-		25	2
Total	England		0	0	0	0	0	0	0	0	0	0
Career total			31	3	1	0	0	0	0	0	32	3
