= Gary Borrowdale =

English footballer (born 1985)

Personal information
- Full name: Gareth Ian Borrowdale
- Date of birth: 16 July 1985 (age 41)
- Place of birth: Worcester Park, England
- Height: 6 ft 0 in (1.83 m)
- Position: Left back

Team information
- Current team: Greenwich Borough

Youth career
- ?–2002: Crystal Palace

Senior career*
Years	Team	Apps	(Gls)
2002–2007	Crystal Palace	98	(0)
2007–2009	Coventry City	21	(0)
2008	→ Colchester United (loan)	4	(0)
2008–2009	→ Queens Park Rangers (loan)	0	(0)
2009–2013	Queens Park Rangers	22	(0)
2009	→ Brighton & Hove Albion (loan)	12	(0)
2010	→ Charlton Athletic (loan)	10	(0)
2011	→ Carlisle United (loan)	1	(0)
2011	→ Barnet (loan)	11	(0)
2013	Carrick Rangers		
2013	Tonbridge Angels	5	(0)
2013–2014	Margate		
2014	Gillingham	0	(0)
2014–2015	Greenwich Borough	33	(0)

International career^{‡}
2001	England U16	2	(0)
2001–2002	England U17	7	(0)
2002	England U18	1	(0)
2003–2004	England U19	3	(0)
2004–2005	England U20	3	(0)
- * Club domestic league appearances and goals as of 14:42, 21 February 2021 (UTC) ‡ National team caps and goals as of 03:13, 20 February 2010 (UTC)

Gareth Ian Borrowdale (born 16 July 1985) is an English footballer. A left-sided player, Borrowdale plays as a left-back. He has also been known to operate as a central defender.

== Club career ==
Borrowdale began his career at Crystal Palace, and made his debut aged 17, in December 2002. He gave a good performance and made a regular place for himself in the first team, quickly making the transition to first-team football and becoming a regular member of the first XI. At just age 21, he made his 100th appearance for Palace, and looked to have a big future, collecting the club's "Young Player of the Year" award to cap some strong performances in the 2006–07 season. However, this would be his last at Selhurst Park. With his contract expired, he opted to join former Palace boss Iain Dowie at Coventry City, for a tribunal fee of £650,000.

At Coventry his career stuttered somewhat, with the team struggling and Dowie sacked, resulting in Borrowdale spending most of the season on the sidelines. In September 2008, he joined Colchester United on a month-long emergency loan. He started his first match for Colchester on 26 September.

On 23 November 2008, he became Queens Park Rangers manager Paulo Sousa's first loan signing since taking over at Loftus Road. He signed with the club on a permanent contract on 2 January 2009.

Borrowdale was loaned out by QPR on a number of occasions. He joined League One side Brighton & Hove Albion on loan for the remainder of the season on 6 March 2009, after an injury to first choice left-back Jimmy McNulty, making 12 appearances for Brighton. On 18 March 2010, he joined League One club Charlton Athletic on a 28-day emergency loan. On 8 February 2011, he agreed a one-month loan deal with another League One club Carlisle United, and made his debut on the same day in a 3–0 defeat at Huddersfield Town. On 30 September 2011, he joined League Two club Barnet on an emergency loan deal.

On 21 May 2012, Queens Park Rangers announced that Borrowdale would be leaving the club when his contract expired at the end of June.

On 21 February 2013, Borrowdale signed for IFA Championship 1 club Carrick Rangers until the end of the 2012–13 season.

On 8 November 2013, he signed for Isthmian League club Margate.

Borrowdale returned to professional football at the end of January 2014 when he signed for Gillingham. He was released by the club at the end of the 2013–14 season, without having played a match for them.

On 5 August 2014, Borrowdale signed for Greenwich Borough. In May 2016, he took up a coaching role at the club.
