= Stuart Giddings =

English footballer

Personal information
- Full name: Stuart James Giddings
- Date of birth: 27 March 1986 (age 40)
- Place of birth: Coventry, England
- Position: Defender

Senior career*
Years	Team	Apps	(Gls)
2003–2008	Coventry City	16	(0)
2007–2008	→ Oldham Athletic (loan)	2	(0)
2008–2009	Hinckley United	37	(3)
2009–2010	Darlington	22	(0)
2010	Ilkeston Town		
2010–2011	Hinckley United	16	(1)
Total		93	(4)

International career
2001–2002	England U16	6	(0)
2003	England U17	5	(0)
2004	England U18	1	(0)
2004	England U19	5	(0)
- * Club domestic league appearances and goals

Stuart James Giddings (born 27 March 1986) is an English footballer.

== Career ==
Born in Coventry, Giddings, a left-back, broke into the Coventry City first-team for his debut at the end of the 2003–04 season, when he came on as a late substitute in the final match of the season against Crystal Palace.

He represented England at all youth age groups up to under-19 level, but missed out on the 2005 Under 19 European Championships because of injury. He returned to action as a substitute during a 2–2 draw with Cardiff City in February 2007, but spent the rest of the campaign regaining his fitness ahead of a make-or-break 2007–08 season.

Giddings struggled once again with injury during the 2007–08 season. Once he regained fitness, he was sent out on loan to Oldham Athletic. New Coventry manager Chris Coleman announced that Giddings would be one of eight players whose contracts would not be renewed at the end of the season so he was released. In September 2008, Giddings joined Hinckley United debuting in the 4–1 FA Cup second qualifying round home victory over Solihull Moors on 27 September 2008.

On 10 November 2009, Giddings left Hinckley United to go on a week-long trial with Darlington, then bottom of the Football League. He earned a contract until the end of the season, and made 22 appearances, but was released early from his contract.

Having trialled with Kidderminster Harriers during the pre-season, Giddings joined Ilkeston Town for the 2010–2011 season.

After the demise of Ilkeston Town in September 2010, Giddings rejoined Hinckley United on 1 October 2010.

Giddings' career has been set back by a long-term knee injury.

== Honours ==
=== As a player ===
- Coventry City
  - Birmingham Senior Cup winner: 2006–07
