= Kevin Thornton (footballer) =

Irish association football player (born 1986)

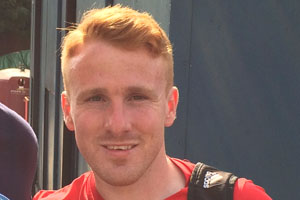

Personal information
- Full name: Kevin Anthony Thornton
- Date of birth: 9 July 1986 (age 40)
- Place of birth: Drogheda, Ireland
- Position: Attacking midfielder

Youth career
- Belvedere
- Coventry City

Senior career*
Years	Team	Apps	(Gls)
2005–2009	Coventry City	50	(2)
2008	→ Brighton & Hove Albion (loan)	12	(0)
2009	Coventry Sphinx	2	(1)
2009	Boyne Rovers	12	(1)
2009–2010	Nuneaton Town	0	(0)
2010–2011	Northampton Town	38	(7)
2011–2012	Nuneaton Town	2	(0)
2013–2014	Wrexham	19	(3)
2014	→ Tamworth (loan)	12	(3)
2014–2015	Tamworth	28	(2)
2015	Barwell	8	(1)
2015–2016	Rugby Town	29	(17)
2016–2017	Coventry United	27	(7)
2017–2019	Hinckley AFC		
2019	RC Warwick	6	(1)
2020–	Coventry United		

International career
–	Republic of Ireland U21		
- * Club domestic league appearances and goals as of 11:15, 24 December 2017 (UTC)

Kevin Anthony Thornton (born 9 July 1986) is an Irish retired footballer who played as a midfielder. He started his career at Coventry City, and has played for clubs including Brighton and Hove Albion, Coventry Sphinx, and Coventry United.

== Playing career ==
=== Coventry City ===
A promising midfielder and product of the Sky Blues' Academy, Thornton was given a squad number for the first time in the 2005–06 season, following a productive pre-season in which he was included on the trips to Ibiza and his native Ireland. He made his debut on 20 September 2005, in a League Cup 1–0 defeat at Selhurst Park, replacing Isaac Osbourne on 83 minutes. He made sixteen Championship appearances later in the season, putting in a string of impressive displays in March and April. A fans' favourite due to his exciting style of play, Thornton scored his first goal for the club on 26 August 2006 against Hull City, but an ankle injury marred what seemed destined to be a successful season, limiting him to just 13 appearances. The Irishman penned a new two-year extension to his contract in May 2007, keeping him at the club until summer 2010. In 2007–08 he was limited to twenty appearances and continued to be used mainly as a substitute. He had a good run at the end of the season under new manager Chris Coleman.

=== Brighton & Hove Albion (Loan) ===
In September 2008, Thornton signed a six-week loan deal at League One team Brighton & Hove Albion. Following a six-week extension on the loan, he had played fifteen games for the Seagulls before returning to the Ricoh Arena.

=== Coventry Sphinx ===
After leaving Coventry City on 2 July 2009, Thornton joined Coventry Sphinx of the Midland Football Alliance and made two appearances and scored once in a short spell.

=== Boyne Rovers ===
On 1 September 2009, Thornton re-signed with his former school boy club Boyne Rovers FC. Boyne Rovers senior side operate in the fifth Tier of Irish amateur soccer. Convinced by legendary Rovers manager Declan Kierans that his time there would be a stepping stone to bigger things Thornton played 12 times for Rovers and scored the winning goal in a 4–3 win over bitter local rivals Drogheda Town.

=== Nuneaton Town ===
On 2 December 2009 he joined Nuneaton Town on a non-contract deal, playing football part-time whilst also touring the West Midlands with his indie three-piece band.

=== Northampton Town ===
On 8 January 2010 he joined Football League Two outfit Northampton Town on a short-term contract during his time at Northampton Town, he made 24 Starts and 21 appearances.

=== Return to Nuneaton Town ===
As of 27 September he has signed a one-year contract with his former club Nuneaton Town. In his second spell at the club Thornton made just two appearances due to injury. He left Nuneaton Town shortly after.

=== Wrexham ===
Thornton had trials with a number of Football League and Non League clubs and on 3 July 2012, he joined Welsh club Wrexham on trial with view to a permanent deal for the new season. After six months on trial Thornton signed for Wrexham on non-contract terms. Thornton made his debut in a 5–0 win in an FA Trophy match against Sutton United which Thornton scored the fifth goal in. He then made his league debut in a 1–0 victory over Barrow FC, a game in which Thornton came off the bench to score the winner. He then made his first league start for the club on 2 March, against Alfreton Town FC, he continued his fine run of goals by opening the scoring, and was later greeted with a standing ovation when he was substituted. Kevin scored his fourth goal for Wrexham in his fourth league game for the club, against Ebbsfleet United, which was his fourth in four. The Irishman's most important goal came at Wembley Stadium in March 2013, It was in the FA Trophy Final and Wrexham were a goal down to Grimsby Town, and skipper Dean Keates was fouled in the Grimsby box, this resulted in a penalty for Wrexham in the 82nd minute, Thornton stepped up to take it and equalised, this took the game to extra-time and penalties, Thornton was substituted before the shoot-out which Wrexham won to lift the trophy. On 11 March 2014, Thornton joined Conference National side Tamworth on loan until the end of the season.

=== Tamworth ===
Following his release by Wrexham, Thornton rejoined Tamworth on 9 June 2014. Released by Tamworth at the end of the 2014–15 season, Thornton briefly joined Barwell F.C. before following the former Tamworth manager Dale Belford to Rugby Town for whom he scored a penalty on debut in a 3–1 win at Carlton Town.

=== Coventry United ===
Following a short spell at Rugby Town in 2015–16, Thornton joined Coventry United of the Midlands League Premier for the season 2016–17.

=== Boyne Harps FC ===
Following his release from Coventry United, Thornton again returned home to Ireland after a short spell teaching yoga in Cape Verde. He trained with current NEFL Champions Boyne Harps through the winter months and joined on a 12-month contract. After 2 months awaiting clearance from the FA, Thornton made his debut for Harps in a match against local rivals Millmount Celtic, scoring one goal.

=== Racing Club Warwick ===
On 13 June 2019, Thornton joined Racing Club Warwick.

=== Return to Coventry United ===
In April 2020, Thornton re-joined Coventry United.

== Career statistics ==
As of match played 22 May 2014.

Club	Season	League			FA Cup		League Cup		Other (Note: Includes other competitive competitions, including the Football League Trophy and FA Trophy)		Total	
Club	Season	Division	Apps	Goals	Apps	Goals	Apps	Goals	Apps	Goals	Apps	Goals
Coventry City	2005–06	Championship	16	0	0	0	1	0	0	0	17	0
Coventry City	2006–07	Championship	11	1	1	0	1	0	0	0	13	1
Coventry City	2007–08	Championship	19	1	1	0	0	0	0	0	20	1
Brighton & Hove Albion (loan)	2007–08	League One	12	0	0	0	1	0	2	0	15	0
Coventry City	2008–09	Championship	4	0	1	0	0	0	0	0	5	0
Coventry City	Coventry City total		50	2	3	0	2	0	0	0	55	2
Coventry Sphinx	2009–10	Midland Football Alliance	2	1	0	0	–		0	0	2	1
Boyne Rovers	2009–10	Leinster Senior League	12	1	0	0	–		0	0	12	1
Nuneaton Town	2009–10	SFL Premier Division	0	0	0	0	–		0	0	0	0
Northampton Town	2009–10	League Two	11	1	0	0	0	0	0	0	11	1
Northampton Town	2010–11	League Two	25	6	2	1	4	1	1	0	32	8
Northampton Town	2011–12	League Two	2	0	0	0	0	0	0	0	2	0
Northampton Town	Northampton Town total		38	7	2	1	4	1	1	0	45	9
Nuneaton Town	2011–12	Conference North	2	0	0	0	–		0	0	2	0
Nuneaton Town	Nuneaton Town total		2	0	0	0	–		0	0	2	0
Wrexham	2012–13	Conference Premier	10	3	0	0	–		0	0	10	3
Wrexham	2013–14	Conference Premier	9	1	0	0	–		0	0	9	1
Wrexham	Wrexham total		19	4	0	0	–		0	0	19	4
Tamworth (loan)	2013–14	Conference Premier	12	3	0	0	–		0	0	12	3
Tamworth	2014–15	Conference North	0	0	0	0	–		0	0	0	0
Tamworth	Tamworth total		12	3	0	0	–		0	0	12	3
Career totals			135	18	5	1	7	1	3	0	150	20

== Career honours ==
Wrexham

- FA Trophy 2012–13

== Personal life ==
Thornton is the younger brother of former Sunderland and Leyton Orient player Sean Thornton.
