= Lee Hildreth =

English footballer

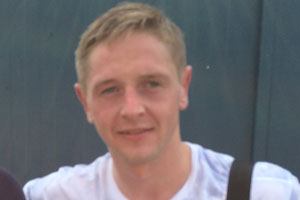

Personal information
- Full name: Lee Mark Hildreth
- Date of birth: 22 November 1988 (age 37)
- Place of birth: Nuneaton, England
- Position: Midfielder

Team information
- Current team: Barwell

Youth career
- Coventry City

Senior career*
Years	Team	Apps	(Gls)
2006–2008	Coventry City	1	(0)
2008	Tamworth	11	(1)
2008–2009	Corby Town	17	(2)
2009	Brackley Town	0	(0)
2012–2013	Nuneaton Griff	14	(3)
2013–2014	Tamworth	17	(1)
2014–2015	Rushall Olympic	15	(1)
2015–2016	Nuneaton Griff	16	(5)
2016–2017	Sutton Coldfield Town		
2017–2018	Barwell		
2018	Nuneaton Griff	2	(1)
2018	Barwell		
2018–2019	Nuneaton Borough	7	(0)
2019–	Barwell	1	(0)
- * Club domestic league appearances and goals as of 00:00, 4 March 2019 (UTC)

Lee Mark Hildreth (born 22 November 1988) is an English footballer who plays for Southern League Premier Central side Barwell, where he plays as a midfielder.

== Playing career ==
=== Coventry City ===
Hildreth joined Coventry City as an eight-year-old after being scouted playing for Hartshill Sports and the Nuneaton-born midfielder went on to captain the City under 18s. He also scored the winning goal in extra-time for Coventry City reserves in the Senior Cup against Nuneaton Borough. They then went on to lift the trophy in May and he followed that success up by making his first-team debut as a late substitute on the final day of the 2006/07 season against Burnley as a substitute for Jay Tabb. At the end of the season he signed his first professional contract with a one-year deal; however, he did not make another appearance for Coventry and at the end of the 2007–2008 season manager Chris Coleman announced Hildreth would be one of eight first team player whose contracts would not be renewed, and was subsequently released.

=== Tamworth ===
Hildreth joined Tamworth in July 2008 but was released by mutual consent on 14 October 2008 after falling out with the management at the club.

=== Corby Town ===
Three days after leaving the club, Hildreth joined Corby Town, making his debut the next day in a 2–1 win over Bedford Town in the FA Trophy.

=== Brackley Town ===
At the end of the season Hildreth left Corby to sign for Brackley Town. after pre season at Brackley Town Lee joined the Marines in September 2009, taking a 4-year break from football to fight in the War in Afghanistan.

=== Nuneaton Griff ===
Hildreth joined Nuneaton Griff in 2012 as his time in the Marines was drawing to an end. He helped Nuneaton Griff go on to the best FA Cup run of the club's history.

=== Tamworth ===
Hildreth rejoined Tamworth for the 2013/2014 season and went on to play holding midfield for Tamworth for the season. He helped the Club go on a great run in the FA Cup, beating Cheltenham in the first round with Lee picking up Man-of-the-match, then going on to lose narrowly in the second round to Bristol City.

=== Rushall Olympic ===
Hildreth left Tamworth and joined Rushall Olympic on 12 September 2014.

=== Nuneaton Griff ===
Hildreth left Rushall Olympic and rejoined Nuneaton Griff at the end of the 2014–15 season, helping Griff stay up.

=== Sutton Coldfield Town ===
Lee signed for Sutton Coldfield Town on 20 November 2016.

=== Barwell ===
Hildreth moved to Barwell on 9 January 2017.

=== Nuneaton Borough ===
On 1 February 2019, Hildreth left Nuneaton Borough.

=== Barwell ===
Lee Hildreth again returned to Barwell on 2 March 2019.

== Career statistics ==
Statistics accurate as of match played 22 June 2014.

Club performance			League		Cup		League Cup		Continental		Total	
Season	Club	League	Apps	Goals	Apps	Goals	Apps	Goals	Apps	Goals	Apps	Goals
England			League		FA Cup		League Cup		Europe		Total	
2006–07	Coventry City	Championship	1	0	0	0	0	0	0	0	1	0
2007–08	Coventry City	Championship	0	0	0	0	0	0	0	0	0	0
2007-08	Tamworth (loan)	Conference North	11	1	0	0	0	0	0	0	11	1
2013–14	Tamworth	Conference Premier	12	1	0	0	0	0	0	0	12	1
Total	England		24	2	0	0	0	0	0	0	24	2
Career total			24	2	0	0	0	0	0	0	24	2
