= Stephen O'Halloran =

Irish footballer

Personal information
- Full name: Stephen Edward O'Halloran
- Date of birth: 29 November 1987 (age 38)
- Place of birth: Cobh, Republic of Ireland
- Height: 6 ft 0 in (1.83 m)
- Positions: Left back; centre back

Youth career
- 2003: Springfield
- 2003–2006: Aston Villa

Senior career*
Years	Team	Apps	(Gls)
2006–2010	Aston Villa	0	(0)
2006–2007	→ Wycombe Wanderers (loan)	11	(0)
2008	→ Southampton (loan)	1	(0)
2008	→ Leeds United (loan)	0	(0)
2008	→ Swansea City (loan)	2	(0)
2010–2011	Coventry City	11	(0)
2011–2012	Carlisle United	3	(0)
2012–2013	Nuneaton Town	37	(0)
2013–2015	Stockport County	67	(1)
2015–2017	Salford City	82	(2)
2017–2018	Stockport County	32	(0)
2018–2019	FC United of Manchester	41	(0)
2019–2022	Stalybridge Celtic	45	(1)
Total		332	(4)

International career
2005–2007	Republic of Ireland U21	13	(0)
2007	Republic of Ireland	2	(0)
- * Club domestic league appearances and goals as of 01:13, 10 May 2022 (UTC)

Stephen Edward O'Halloran (born 29 November 1987) is an Irish former footballer who retired from football in May 2022. He finished his playing career as a defender for Stalybridge Celtic in the Northern Premier League.

He began his professional career in the Premier League with Aston Villa and has earned two full international caps for the Republic of Ireland. Following two serious cruciate ligament injuries during his time at Villa Park he left the club without making a first team appearance. O'Halloran went on to play professional football with Coventry City in 2010–11 and Carlisle United in 2011–12 before moving into semi-professional football in 2012. O'Halloran has gone on to play for Nuneaton Town, Stockport County, Salford City and FC United of Manchester during his NLS career.

He is also a qualified physiotherapist having graduated from the University of Salford in 2016.

== Club career ==
=== Aston Villa ===
O'Halloran was born in Cobh and played for local side Springfield A.F.C., before joining Aston Villa. He broke into the Villa squad for their 2006–07 pre-season friendlies but did not make any first team appearances. In late 2007, O'Halloran began talks over a new long-term contract; it was later confirmed on 31 January 2008, when he signed a new contract with Aston Villa, keeping him at the club until 2009.

However, at the beginning of the 2009–10 season O'Halloran was omitted from the press release announcing Villa's squad numbers. O'Halloran's number 29 shirt was given to Welsh international defender James Collins upon his signing for the club. O'Halloran returned for the reserves, in the national play-off final against Manchester United. Despite never making an appearance, O'Halloran credited O'Neill for standing by him when he was suffering from injury.

=== Loans ===
O'Halloran was loaned out to League Two side Wycombe Wanderers in October 2006. After appearing as an un-used substitute for four matches, O'Halloran made his Wycombe Wanderers debut, making his first start, in a 2–0 loss against Hartlepool United on 25 November 2006. After making ten appearances for the club, O'Halloran's loan spell with Wycombe Wanderers was extended until 20 January 2007. A week after extending his loan, O'Halloran then played a pivotal role in guiding them to the semi-finals of the Football League Cup. However, his loan spell ran out before the second-leg, and Wycombe eventually lost 5–1 to Chelsea.

After failing to make a first team appearance under Martin O'Neill in the 2007–08 season, he was loaned out to Championship side Southampton on 19 January 2008 until February 2008. He made his Southampton debut on 29 January 2008, coming on as a substitute for Grégory Vignal in the 65th minute, in a 1–0 loss against Norwich City. However, after being on the substitute bench for six matches, O'Halloran returned to his parent club.

On 28 February 2008, he signed for League One side Leeds United on an initial one-month loan deal. In the warm up for what would have been his debut for Leeds against Swindon Town at the County Ground, he suffered a serious anterior cruciate ligament injury which kept him out for up to a year. He was replaced in the starting line-up by Frazer Richardson. After suffering the injury he returned to Aston Villa for treatment. After returning from the loan spell at Leeds United, O'Halloran revealed he had a conversation his then teammate Patrik Berger over injury.

On 5 November 2008, O'Halloran signed for newly promoted Championship side Swansea City on an initial three-month loan deal as competition to Argentinian-born left back Federico Bessone. The 21-year-old was signed to fill the gap left by fellow Irish defender Marcos Painter, who was out for the majority of the season through injury. O'Halloran made his Swansea City debut, where he made his first start, in a 2–2 draw against Barnsley on 9 December 2008. However, O'Halloran was the victim of yet another cruciate ligament injury in his spell at Swansea, which caused him to terminate his loan on 25 December 2008. O'Halloran did not rule out a future spell at Swansea, claiming that he "may return one day to have another crack".

=== Coventry City ===
O'Halloran signed a one-year deal with Coventry City on 23 June 2010 and was new manager Aidy Boothroyd's second signing of the close season. Upon joining the club, O'Halloran stated he could one day play in the Premier League.

O'Halloran made his Coventry City debut, coming on as a substitute, in the pre-season friendly against VF Gaflenz on 10 July 2010, which saw Coventry City won 2–0. However, a week later, O'Halloran suffered a stiff back during a pre-season friendly match against Northampton Town and missed at the start of the season.

After recovering to full fitness, O'Halloran remained on the sidelines until on 29 December 2010, where he made his Coventry City debut, coming on as a substitute for Richard Woods in the 76th minute, in a 1–0 win over Queen Park Rangers. After the match, O'Halloran said he was glad to make his return to the pitch. O'Halloran was given a first team run in, where he played through January and February.

However, O'Halloran later came under criticism when the team conceded two late goals in two matches against Swansea City and Leicester City. O'Halloran's form began to falter in the next game on 5 March 2011 when Coventry City lose 4–1 against Bristol City. As a result, O'Halloran lost his first team place in the left-back by Chris Hussey and was on the substitute bench for remaining games towards the end of the season.

After making eleven appearances in his first season at Coventry City, O'Halloran was released after the club decided against offering him a new contract.

=== Carlisle United ===
On 24 June 2011, following a trial at the club, O'Halloran signed a one-year deal with Carlisle United, the contract being officially signed on 1 August 2011. O'Halloran said he joined the club to get regular first team football and was given number 29 jersey.

After appearing in the first four matches as an unused substitute, O'Halloran made his Carlisle United debut, in a 2–1 loss against Leyton Orient. After being sidelined for two matches, O'Halloran remained on the substitute bench until he sustained a cartilage injury in his knee, requiring surgery. After two months on the sidelines, O'Halloran made his return to training in January.

O'Halloran struggled to regain his first team place and made only three appearances before being released at the end of the 2011–12 season.

=== Nuneaton Town ===
After a brief trial, O'Halloran signed a one-year deal with National League team Nuneaton Town.

O'Halloran made his Nuneaton Town debut in the opening game of the season, where he played at left back for 90 minutes in a 5–4 loss against Ebbsfleet United. O'Halloran then played in his first match in midfield on 10 November 2012, in a 1–0 win over Kidderminster Harriers. O'Halloran went on to make thirty-seven appearances, where he played in defence and midfield.

At the end of the 2012–13 season, O'Halloran was released by the club.

=== Stockport County ===
After leaving Nuneaton Town, O'Halloran joined Stockport Country on 13 June 2013.

O'Halloran finished his first season at Stockport County on a high note, resulting him signing a new contract. After the end of the 2014–15 season, O'Halloran left Stockport County, ending his two years at the club.

=== Salford City ===
In May 2015, O'Halloran signed for Salford City.

O'Halloran made his Salford City debut in the opening game of the season, in a 0–0 draw against Marine. Having become a regular in the first team, O'Halloran scored his first Salford City goal in the second round of FA Cup, in a 1–1 draw against Hartlepool United on 3 December 2015. O'Halloran later scored the equaliser in a 3–2 win over Workington, to help the club reach promotion to National League North.

=== Stockport County ===
In June 2017, O'Halloran rejoined Stockport Country, signing a one-year contract ahead of the start of the National League North season. O'Halloran played 39 league and cup matches on his return to County and helped the team to the playoffs. Stockport Country lost in the playoffs 1–0 to Chorley.

=== F.C. United of Manchester ===
On 3 June 2018, O'Halloran joined FC United of Manchester. O'Halloran made 45 appearances for the club in a season in which the club suffered its first relegation.

=== Stalybridge Celtic ===
On 6 June 2019, O'Halloran signed a one-year contract with Stalybridge Celtic in the Northern Premier League. He was named club captain by manager Simon Haworth at the start of the season.

O'Halloran signed a new deal to stay with Stalybridge Celtic ahead of the 2020–21 season as a player/coach.

On 5 May 2021, O'Halloran renewed his contract with Stalybridge Celtic as player/coach for the 2021–22 season. O'Halloran was appointed to a new role as player/assistant manager for Stalybridge Celtic on 14 September 2021, beginning his new role as assistant to Simon Haworth in Celtic's 3–0 victory over Scarborough.

== International career ==
On 16 May 2007, O'Halloran was named in Steve Staunton's Republic of Ireland squad and played in the friendlies against Ecuador and Bolivia, despite not having played a single first team game for Aston Villa.

O'Halloran also represented his country at U15, U16, U17 and U21 level.

He won the FAI Under 21 player of the year in 2008.

== Career statistics ==
As of match played 23 April 2022

Appearances and goals by club, season and competition
Club	Season	League			FA Cup		League Cup		Other		Total	
Club	Season	Division	Apps	Goals	Apps	Goals	Apps	Goals	Apps	Goals	Apps	Goals
Wycombe Wanderers (loan)	2006–07	League Two	11	0	0	0	2	0	1 (Note: Appearances in the Football League Trophy)	0	14	0
Southampton (loan)	2007–08	Championship	1	0	0	0	0	0	—		1	0
Swansea City (loan)	2008–09	Championship	2	0	0	0	1	0	—		3	0
Coventry City	2010–11	Championship	11	0	2	0	0	0	—		13	0
Carlisle United	2011–12	League One	3	0	0	0	1	0	1	0	5	0
Nuneaton Town	2012–13	National league	37	0	0	0	—		1 (Note: Appearance in the FA Trophy)	0	38	0
Stockport County	2013–14	National League North	26	0	0	0	—		1	0	27	0
Stockport County	2014–15	National League North	41	1	1	0	—		6	0	48	1
Stockport County	Stockport County total		67	1	1	0	0	0	7	0	75	1
Salford City	2015–16	Northern Premier League	46	1	4	1	—		3	0	53	2
Salford City	2016–17	National League North	27	0	0	0	—		2	0	29	0
Salford City	Salford City total		73	1	4	1	0	0	5	0	82	2
Stockport County	2017–18	National League North	32	0	0	0	—		12	0	44	0
F.C. United of Manchester	2018–19	National League North	41	0	0	0	—		4	0	45	0
Stalybridge Celtic	2019–20	Northern Premier League	32	1	0	0	—		5	0	37	1
Stalybridge Celtic	2020–21	Northern Premier League	7	0	0	0	—		1	0	8	0
Stalybridge Celtic	2021–22	Northern Premier League	6	0	0	0	—		1	0	7	0
Stalybridge Celtic	Stalybridge Celtic total		45	1	0	0	0	0	7	0	52	1
Career total			323	3	7	1	4	0	38	0	372	4
