= 2010–11 Coventry City F.C. season =

Coventry City F.C.
2010–11 season
- Chairman: Ray Ranson (until 28 March); Ken Dulieu (from 28 March)
- Manager: Aidy Boothroyd (until 14 March); Steve Harrison (caretaker); Andy Thorn (from 14 March as caretaker; from 28 April as permanent manager)
- Championship: 18th
- FA Cup: Fourth round (eliminated by Birmingham City)
- League Cup: First round (eliminated by Morecambe)
- Top goalscorer: League: All: Marlon King, 13
- Highest home attendance: 28,184 vs Leeds United, Championship, 10.11.12 Cup: 8,162 vs Crystal Palace, FA Cup, 11.01.08
- Lowest home attendance: 12,292 vs Doncaster Rovers, Championship, 10.09.28 Cup: 8,162 vs Crystal Palace, FA Cup, 11.01.08
- Average home league attendance: 16,409
Home colours	Away colours

The 2010–11 season was Coventry City's 91st season in The Football League and their 10th consecutive season in the Football League Championship, giving them the second longest consecutive run in the division, behind only Preston North End. In addition to the Championship, The Sky Blues also entered the League Cup in the First Round, where they were eliminated and the FA Cup in the Third Round where they went on to be eliminated in the Fourth Round.

== Review and events ==
=== Monthly events ===
This is a list of the significant events to occur at the club during the 2010–11 season, presented in chronological order. This list does not include transfers, which are listed in the transfers section below, or match results, which are in the results section.

June:

- 3 – The Ricoh Arena is announced as a venue for Olympic football matches during the 2012 Summer Olympics.
- 4 – Goalkeeper Michael Quirke signs his first professional contract, a one-year deal running until June 2011.
- 16 – Coventry City draw Morecambe away in the League Cup First Round.
- 17 – Coventry City's fixtures for the 2010–11 Championship season are announced

July:

- 19 – Coventry City announce the new squad numbers for the forthcoming season.
- 24 – Lee Carsley is named new club captain for the 2010–11 season, taking over from Stephen Wright.

August:

- 9 – Freddy Eastwood is named in the Official Football League Championship team of the week, following his performance against Portsmouth.
- 10 – Jonson Clarke-Harris, aged 16 years and 20 days becomes youngest player to ever appear for The Sky Blues, as a substitute against Morecambe in the League Cup.
- 13 – Shaun Jeffers is called up to the England Under-19 squad for the first time for the match against Slovakia Under-19.
- 23 – Ben Turner is named in the Official Football League Championship team of the week, following his performance against Derby County.

September:

- 2 – Shaun Jeffers wins his first England Under-19 cap in a friendly against Slovakia Under-19.
- 8 – Martyn Pert is appointed new Coventry City Assistant Manager.

October:

- 29 – Midfielder Conor Thomas signs his first professional contract, a three-year deal running until 2013.

November:

- 1 – Keiren Westwood is named in the Official Football League Championship team of the week, following his performance against Sheffield United.
- 11 – Aidy Boothroyd is nominated for the Football League Championship Manager of the Month for October.
- 28 – Coventry City draw Crystal Palace at home in the FA Cup Third Round.
- 29 – James McPake and Gary McSheffrey are named in the Official Football League Championship team of the week, following their performances against Scunthorpe United.

December:

- 6 – Keiren Westwood and James McPake are named in the Official Football League Championship team of the week, following their performances against Middlesbrough.
- 21 – The Ricoh Arena is announced as a venue for the 2011 Women's FA Cup.
- 23 – Defender Ben Turner signs a new three-and-a-half-year contract, running until Summer 2014.

January:

- 9 – Coventry City draw Birmingham City away in the FA Cup Fourth Round.

February:

- 7 – Jordan Clarke and Nathan Cameron are called up to the England Under-20 squad for the first time for the match against France Under-20.
- 10 – Jordan Clarke and Nathan Cameron win their first caps for England Under-20 in a friendly against France Under-20.

March:

- 10 – Midfielder Gary McSheffrey has a one-year contract extension activated, running until June 2012.
- 11 – Michael Quirke is called up to the Republic of Ireland Under-21 squad for the first time for the match against Portugal Under-21.
- 14 – Manager Aidy Boothroyd and Assistant Manager Martyn Pert are relieved of managerial duties with immediate effect.
- 14 – First Team Coach Steve Harrison and Chief Scout Andy Thorn are placed in caretaker charge of first team duties.
- 25 – Coventry City confirm that they are under a Football League transfer embargo, due to not making full payments on debt owed.
- 25 – Michael Quirke wins his first cap for Republic of Ireland Under-21 in a friendly against Portugal Under-21.
- 28 – Chairman Ray Ranson resigns and is replaced by SISU representative Ken Dulieu.

April:

- 4 – Keiren Westwood wins South Wales Supporters' Club's Player of the Season Award for 2010/2011.
- 8 – Striker Clive Platt has a one-year contract extension activated, running until June 2012.
- 18 – Marlon King is named in the Official Football League Championship team of the week, following his performances against Portsmouth and Millwall.
- 19 – Keiren Westwood wins Irish Supporters' Club Player of the Season Award for 2010/2011.
- 20 – Richard Keogh wins London Supporters' Club Player of the Season Award for 2010/2011.
- 28 – Former Chief Scout and current Caretaker Manager Andy Thorn is appointed as permanent Coventry City Manager.
- 29 – Strikers Shaun Jeffers and Callum Wilson sign new two-year contract extensions running until June 2013.

May:

- 2 – Gary McSheffrey wins Coventry City Supporters' Club Player of the Season Award for 2010/2011.
- 3 – Ben Turner wins Coventry City Former Players Association Player of the Year Award for 2010/2011.
- 5 – Marlon King is nominated for the Football League Championship Player of the Month, for the month of April.
- 3 – Carl Baker wins Community Player of the Season Award for 2010/2011.
- 3 – Lukas Jutkiewicz wins Young Player of the Season Award for 2010/2011.
- 3 – Gary McSheffrey wins Goal of the Season Award for 2010/2011 for his strike against Burnley.
- 3 – Marlon King wins Top Scorer Award for 2010/2011.
- 3 – Richard Keogh wins Players' Player of the Season Award for 2010/2011.
- 3 – Marlon King wins Fans' Player of the Season Award for 2010/2011.
- 3 – Jimmy Hill wins Outstanding Achievement Award at 2010/2011 ceremony.
- 19 – Coventry City announce the Football League transfer embargo has been lifted.
- 27 – Goalkeeper Lee Burge and Defender Cyrus Christie sign their first professional contracts, a one-year deals running until June 2012.
- 27 – Defender Jordan Clarke signs a new three-year contract extension running until June 2014.

== Squad details ==
=== Players info ===
No.	Name	Nat.	Place of birth	Date of birth	Club apps.	Club goals	Int. caps	Int. goals	Previous club	Date joined	Fee
1	Keiren Westwood	(Republic of Ireland)	Manchester	23 October 1984	95	0	3	0	Carlisle United	18 June 2008	£500,000
2	Richard Keogh	(Republic of Ireland)	Harlow	11 August 1986	–	–	–	–	Carlisle United	1 July 2010	Undisclosed
3	Stephen O'Halloran	(Republic of Ireland)	Cobh	29 November 1987	–	–	2	0	Aston Villa	1 July 2010	Free
4	Sammy Clingan	(Northern Ireland)	Belfast	13 January 1984	36	5	24	0	Norwich City	24 July 2009	£700,000
5	Lee Carsley	(Republic of Ireland)	Birmingham	28 February 1974	52	5	39	0	Birmingham City	23 July 2010	Free
6	James McPake	(Scotland)	Bellshill	24 June 1984	24	1	–	–	Livingston	2 February 2009	Undisclosed
7	David Bell	(Republic of Ireland)	Kettering	21 January 1984	39	4	–	–	Norwich City	30 January 2009	£500,000
8	Michael Doyle	(Republic of Ireland)	Dublin	8 July 1981	278	25	1	0	Celtic	1 July 2003	Free
9	Marlon King	(Jamaica)	Dulwich	26 April 1980	–	–	18	10	Wigan Athletic	20 September 2010	Free
10	Freddy Eastwood	(Wales)	Basildon	29 October 1983	91	12	10	4	Wolverhampton Wanderers	11 July 2008	£1,200,000
11	Lukas Jutkiewicz	(England)	Southampton	28 March 1989	–	–	–	–	Everton	26 July 2010	Undisclosed
12	Gary Deegan	(Republic of Ireland)	Dublin	28 September 1987	17	2	–	–	Bohemians	4 January 2010	€90,000
13	Colin Doyle	(Republic of Ireland)	Cork	12 June 1985	–	–	1	0	Birmingham City	10 August 2010	Loan
13	Iain Turner	(Scotland)	Stirling	26 January 1984	–	–	–	–	Everton	14 August 2010	Loan
13	Lee Burge	(England)	Hereford	9 January 1993	–	–	–	–	N/A	1 June 2010	Trainee
14	Chris Hussey	(England)	Hammersmith	2 January 1989	8	0	–	–	AFC Wimbledon	1 January 2010	Undisclosed
15	Martin Cranie	(England)	Yeovil	23 September 1986	42	1	–	–	Portsmouth	13 August 2009	£500,000
16	Isaac Osbourne	(England)	Coventry	22 June 1986	135	0	–	–	N/A	1 January 2003	Trainee
17	Aron Gunnarsson	(Iceland)	Akureyri	22 April 1989	89	1	17	0	AZ Alkmaar	17 June 2008	Undisclosed
18	Carl Baker	(England)	Whiston	26 December 1982	22	0	–	–	Stockport County	8 January 2010	Undisclosed
19	Gary McSheffrey	(England)	Coventry	13 August 1982	162	53	–	–	Birmingham City	1 July 2010	Free
20	Ben Turner	(England)	Birmingham	21 January 1988	70	0	–	–	N/A	1 July 2005	Trainee
21	Michael McIndoe	(Scotland)	Edinburgh	2 December 1979	43	1	–	–	Bristol City	4 August 2009	£350,000
22	Clive Platt	(England)	Wolverhampton	27 October 1977	–	–	–	–	Colchester United	28 July 2010	Nominal
23	Danny Ireland	(Australia)	Sydney	30 September 1990	2	0	–	–	N/A	1 July 2007	Trainee
24	Richard Wood	(England)	Ossett	5 July 1985	26	3	–	–	Sheffield Wednesday	1 January 2010	Undisclosed
25	Jermaine Grandison	(England)	Birmingham	15 December 1990	7	0	–	–	N/A	1 June 2008	Trainee
26	Jordan Clarke	(England)	Coventry	19 November 1991	13	0	–	–	N/A	1 June 2008	Trainee
27	Danny Ward	(England)	Bradford	11 December 1991	–	–	–	–	Bolton Wanderers	10 September 2010	Loan
29	Roy O'Donovan	(Republic of Ireland)	Cork	10 August 1985	–	–	–	–	Sunderland	1 July 2010	Free
30	Nathan Cameron	(England)	Birmingham	21 November 1991	1	0	–	–	N/A	1 June 2009	Trainee
31	Shaun Jeffers	(England)	Bedford	14 April 1992	5	0	–	–	N/A	1 June 2009	Trainee
32	Callum Wilson	(England)	Coventry	27 February 1992	1	0	–	–	N/A	1 June 2009	Trainee
33	Michael Quirke	(Republic of Ireland)	Coventry	10 September 1991	–	–	–	–	N/A	1 June 2009	Trainee
36	Josh Ruffels	(England)	Oxford	23 October 1993	–	–	–	–	N/A	1 June 2010	Trainee
37	Luke Bottomer	(England)	Walsall	5 September 1992	–	–	–	–	N/A	1 June 2010	Trainee
38	Cyrus Christie	(England)	Coventry	30 September 1992	–	–	–	–	N/A	1 June 2010	Trainee
39	Jonson Clarke-Harris	(England)	Leicester	20 July 1994	–	–	–	–	N/A	1 June 2010	Trainee
40	Conor Thomas	(England)	Coventry	29 October 1993	–	–	–	–	N/A	1 June 2010	Trainee
41	Gaël Bigirimana	(Burundi)	Burundi	22 October 1993	–	–	–	–	N/A	1 June 2010	Trainee
42	Conor Grogan	(England)	London	4 September 1992	–	–	–	–	N/A	1 June 2009	Trainee

== Matches ==
=== Pre-season friendlies ===
10 July 2010	VF Gaflenz	0–2	Coventry City	Austria
10:00 GMT		(Report)	Bell 28'; Wood 39'; Gunnarsson (yellow card) 35'	Stadium: Obertraun; Attendance: Closed Doors

14 July 2010	Nuneaton Town	0–0	Coventry City	Nuneaton
19:30 GMT		(Report)		Stadium: Liberty Way

17 July 2010	Hinckley United	0–0	Coventry City	Hinckley
15:00 GMT		(Report)		Stadium: The Greene King Stadium

21 July 2010	Northampton Town	0–1	Coventry City	Northampton
19:45 GMT		(Report)	McPake 5'	Stadium: Sixfields Stadium; Attendance: 1,829

24 July 2010	Walsall	0–2	Coventry City	Walsall
15:00 GMT		(Report)	Eastwood 60'; Jeffers 90'	Stadium: The Banks' Stadium; Attendance: 1,744

27 July 2010	Shrewsbury Town	0–0	Coventry City	Shrewsbury
15:00 GMT		(Report)		Stadium: Prostar Stadium; Attendance: 2,046

31 July 2010	Coventry City	1–1	West Bromwich Albion	Coventry
15:00 GMT	McSheffrey 14', (yellow card) 35'; Platt (yellow card) 62'	(Report)	Miller 73'; Mattock (yellow card) 40'; Bednář (yellow card) 70'	Stadium: Ricoh Arena

=== Championship ===
7 August 2010 1	Coventry City	2–0	Portsmouth	Coventry
15:00 GMT	Eastwood 4', 70'; Turner (yellow card) 61'	(Report)	Utaka (yellow card) 33'3	Stadium: Ricoh Arena; Attendance: 18,814; Referee: Andy D'Urso

14 August 2010 2	Watford	2–2	Coventry City	Watford
15:00 GMT	Buckley 45'; Eustace 58', (yellow card) 90'	(Report)	Bell 88'; Jutkiewicz 90' (pen.)	Stadium: Vicarage Road; Attendance: 12,813; Referee: Trevor Kettle

21 August 2010 3	Coventry City	2–1	Derby County	Coventry
12:15 GMT	Jutkiewicz 33' (pen.); Turner 80'; Cameron (yellow card) 78'; Eastwood (yellow card) 79'; Clarke (yellow card) 90'	(Report)	Moxey 52'; Roberts (yellow card) 9'; Leacock (yellow card) 32'	Stadium: Ricoh Arena; Attendance: 13,169; Referee: Eddie Ilderton

28 August 2010 4	Millwall	3–1	Coventry City	London
15:00 GMT	Crainie 17' (o.g.); Trotter 75'; Morison 80' (pen.); Abdou (yellow card) 66'	(Report)	Gunnarsson 61'; Baker (yellow card) 66' (yellow-red card) 72'	Stadium: The Den; Attendance: 11,688; Referee: Jon Moss

11 September 2010 5	Coventry City	1–1	Leicester City	Coventry
12:30 GMT	Platt 41'; McIndoe (yellow card) 67'; Carsley (yellow card) 69'; Doyle (yellow card) 78'	(Report)	King 76'; Wellens (yellow card) 79'	Stadium: Ricoh Arena; Attendance: 20,060; Referee: Anthony Taylor

14 September 2010 6	Swansea City	2–1	Coventry City	Swansea
19:45 GMT	Pratley 20'; Sinclair 47'; Williams (yellow card) 45'; Dyer (yellow card) 68'	(Report)	Turner 57'; Platt (yellow card) 7'; Baker (yellow card) 73'	Stadium: Liberty Stadium; Attendance: 12,411; Referee: Gary Sutton

18 September 2010 7	Bristol City	1–2	Coventry City	Bristol
15:00 GMT	Elliott 42'; Skuse (yellow card) 55'	(Report)	Platt 23'; Turner 45', (yellow card) 68'; Jutkiewicz (yellow card) 43'; Gunnarsson (yellow card) 77'	Stadium: Ashton Gate; Attendance: 13,428; Referee: Iain Williamson

25 September 2010 8	Coventry City	1–2	Preston North End	Coventry
15:00 GMT	Gunnarsson 61'; Carsley (yellow card) 76'	(Report)	Jones 35', (yellow card) 90'; Hume 45'; Parry (yellow card) 83'	Stadium: Ricoh Arena; Attendance: 14,945; Referee: Carl Boyeson

28 September 2010 9	Coventry City	2–1	Doncaster Rovers	Coventry
15:00 GMT	Gunnarsson 2'; McSheffrey 86', (yellow card) 87'	(Report)	Sharp 43', (yellow card) 45'	Stadium: Ricoh Arena; Attendance: 12,292; Referee: Andy Penn

2 October 2010 10	Hull City	0–0	Coventry City	Kingston upon Hull
15:00 GMT	Vine (yellow card) 2'; Ayala (yellow card) 30'; Dawson (yellow card) 60'	(Report)	Carsley (yellow card) 64'; Clingan (yellow card) 84'	Stadium: KC Stadium; Attendance: 20,626; Referee: Steve Rushton

16 October 2010 11	Ipswich Town	1–2	Coventry City	Ipswich
15:00 GMT	Scotland 59'	(Report)	Platt 23'; Jutkiewicz 57' (pen.); Keogh (yellow card) 29'	Stadium: Portman Road; Attendance: 19,100; Referee: Rob Shoebridge

19 October 2010 12	Coventry City	1–2	Cardiff City	Coventry
19:45 GMT	McSheffrey 44'; Turner (yellow card) 28'; Clingan (yellow card) 60'	(Report)	Whittingham 5' (pen.); Bothroyd 87'	Stadium: Ricoh Arena; Attendance: 14,604; Referee: James Linington

23 October 2010 13	Coventry City	3–0	Barnsley	Coventry
15:00 GMT	McSheffrey 9'; Baker 86'; Clarke 90'; Turner (yellow card) 28'	(Report)	Dickinson (yellow card) 85'	Stadium: Ricoh Arena; Attendance: 14,573; Referee: Anthony Bates

30 October 2010 14	Sheffield United	0–1	Coventry City	Sheffield
15:00 GMT		(Report)	McSheffrey 23'	Stadium: Bramall Lane; Attendance: 20,059; Referee: David Foster

6 November 2010 15	Coventry City	2–3	Leeds United	Coventry
15:00 GMT	Jutkiewicz 52'; Turner 64'; Carsley (yellow card) 54'	(Report)	Howson 5'; Snodgrass 40'; Gradel 61' (pen.); Collins (yellow card) 45'; Faye (yellow card) 55'; Brown (yellow card) 72'; Becchio (yellow card) 86'	Stadium: Ricoh Arena; Attendance: 28,184; Referee: Keith Stroud

9 November 2010 16	Nottingham Forest	2–1	Coventry City	Nottingham
19:45 GMT	Majewski 41'; Cohen 62'; Chambers (yellow card) 45'; Danns (yellow card) 46'; Vaughan (yellow card) 60'	(Report)	Chambers 35' (o.g.); Wood (yellow card) 55'; Clingan (yellow card) 69'	Stadium: City Ground; Attendance: 19,501; Referee: Andre Marriner

13 November 2010 17	Crystal Palace	2–0	Coventry City	London
15:00 GMT	Ambrose 33', 54' (pen.); Wright (yellow card) 42'; Danns (yellow card) 46'; Vaughan (yellow card) 60'	(Report)	McPake (yellow card) 32'; Wood (yellow card) 60'	Stadium: Selhurst Park; Attendance: 13,278; Referee: Pat Miller

20 November 2010 18	Coventry City	1–0	Burnley	Coventry
15:00 GMT	Doyle 57'; McSheffrey (yellow card) 35'; McPake (yellow card) 55'	(Report)	Duff (yellow card) 62'	Stadium: Ricoh Arena; Attendance: 14,432; Referee: David Webb

27 November 2010 19	Scunthorpe United	0–2	Coventry City	Scunthorpe
15:00 GMT		(Report)	McSheffrey 32'; Murphy 73' (o.g.); McPake (yellow card) 88'	Stadium: Glanford Park; Attendance: 4,397; Referee: Craig Pawson

3 December 2010 20	Coventry City	1–0	Middlesbrough	Coventry
15:00 GMT	King 78' (pen.); McSheffrey (yellow card) 77'; Jutkiewicz (yellow card) 90'	(Report)	Wheater (yellow card) 77'; Bennett (yellow card) 90'	Stadium: Ricoh Arena; Attendance: 15,768; Referee: Dean Whitestone

11 December 2010 21	Reading	0–0	Coventry City	Reading
15:00 GMT		(Report)	McPake (yellow card) 3'; Carsley (yellow card) 23'; McSheffrey (yellow card) 64'; Wood (yellow card) 73'	Stadium: Madejski Stadium; Attendance: 14,029; Referee: Paul Tierney

18 December 2010 22	Coventry City	1–2	Norwich City	Coventry
15:00 GMT	King 73'; Bell (yellow card) 22'; Gunnarsson (red card) 35'; Platt (yellow card) 42'; Cameron (yellow card) 89'	(Report)	Holt 65', 88'; Fox (yellow card) 25'	Stadium: Ricoh Arena; Attendance: 15,230; Referee: Chris Sarginson

26 December 2010 23	Cardiff City	2–0	Coventry City	Cardiff
15:00 GMT	Olofinjana 21'; Bellamy 83', (yellow card) 60'	(Report)	Doyle (yellow card) 35'; Keogh (yellow card) 84'	Stadium: Cardiff City Stadium; Attendance: 24,595; Referee: Graham Salisbury

28 December 2010 24	Coventry City	0–2	Queens Park Rangers	Coventry
12:15 GMT	McSheffrey (yellow card) 25'; King (red card) 59'	(Report)	Westwood 49' (o.g.); Smith 61'; Helguson (yellow card) 21'; Faurlín (yellow card) 31'	Stadium: Ricoh Arena; Attendance: 17,678; Referee: Neil Swarbrick

1 January 2011 25	Coventry City	1–1	Ipswich Town	Coventry
15:00 GMT	Eastwood 48'; King (red card) 59'	(Report)	Fallon 44'; Scotland (yellow card) 62'	Stadium: Ricoh Arena; Attendance: 14,412; Referee: Russell Booth

3 January 2011 26	Barnsley	2–1	Coventry City	Barnsley
15:00 GMT	Doyle 4'; Lovre 57'; Foster (yellow card) 41'	(Report)	Eastwood 35'	Stadium: Oakwell; Attendance: 11,118; Referee: Carl Boyeson

15 January 2011 27	Coventry City	0–0	Sheffield United	Coventry
15:00 GMT		(Report)	Mattock (yellow card) 13'; Bartley (yellow card) 65'	Stadium: Ricoh Arena; Attendance: 14,854; Referee: Colin Webster

23 January 2011 28	Queens Park Rangers	2–1	Coventry City	London
13:15 GMT	Taarabt 45'; Routledge 79'; Derry (yellow card) 39'	(Report)	King 25'; Doyle (yellow card) 23'; O'Halloran (yellow card) 82'	Stadium: Loftus Road; Attendance: 13,185; Referee: Mark Haywood

2 February 2011 29	Coventry City	1–2	Nottingham Forest	Coventry
19:45 GMT	King 26'	(Report)	McGugan 31'; Earnshaw 36'	Stadium: Ricoh Arena; Attendance: 14,631; Referee: Andy D'Urso

5 February 2011 30	Leeds United	1–0	Coventry City	Leeds
15:00 GMT	Somma 56'; Bruce (yellow card) 43'	(Report)	Clarke (yellow card) 81'	Stadium: Elland Road; Attendance: 27,033; Referee: Mick Russell

12 February 2011 31	Coventry City	2–1	Crystal Palace	Coventry
15:00 GMT	Wood 34'; King 79', (yellow card) 81'	(Report)	Iversen 90'; Gardner (yellow card) 78'; Vaughan (yellow card) 82'; Zaha (yellow card) 89'	Stadium: Ricoh Arena; Attendance: 16,454; Referee: Keith Wright

22 February 2011 32	Coventry City	0–1	Swansea City	Coventry
19:45 GMT	O'Halloran (yellow card) 11'	(Report)	Dobbie 76'	Stadium: Ricoh Arena; Attendance: 13,481; Referee: Keith Stroud

26 February 2011 33	Leicester City	1–1	Coventry City	Leicester
15:00 GMT	Naughton 45'; Bamba (yellow card) 80'	(Report)	King 15'; O'Halloran (yellow card) 48'; Gunnarsson (yellow card) 50'; Cranie (yellow card) 62' (yellow-red card) 90'	Stadium: Walkers Stadium; Attendance: 25,356; Referee: Graham Scott

5 March 2011 34	Coventry City	1–4	Bristol City	Coventry
15:00 GMT	Jutkiewicz 53'; King (red card) 60'	(Report)	Maynard 15'; Nyatanga 24'; Clarkson 44' (pen.); Elliott 84'	Stadium: Ricoh Arena; Attendance: 15,157; Referee: Gavin Ward

8 March 2011 35	Doncaster Rovers	1–1	Coventry City	Doncaster
19:45 GMT	Hayter 88'; Stock (yellow card) 54'	(Report)	Eastwood 23'; Cameron (yellow card) 51'	Stadium: Keepmoat Stadium; Attendance: 7,921; Referee: David Webb

12 March 2011 36	Coventry City	0–1	Hull City	Coventry
15:00 GMT	Clingan (yellow card) 62'; Westwood (yellow card) 84'	(Report)	McLean 33'; Evans (yellow card) 59'; Barmby (yellow card) 89'	Stadium: Ricoh Arena; Attendance: 14,370; Referee: Steve Tanner

15 March 2011 37	Burnley	2–2	Coventry City	Burnley
19:45 GMT	Rodriguez 18', 79'; Carlisle (yellow card) 81'; Elliott (yellow card) 82'	(Report)	Jutkiewicz 61'; McSheffrey 75'; O'Halloran (yellow card) 36'; Baker (yellow card) 89'	Stadium: Turf Moor; Attendance: 13,802; Referee: Michael Naylor

19 March 2011 38	Preston North End	2–1	Coventry City	Preston
15:00 GMT	Hume 24', (yellow card) 86'; Ellington 90'	(Report)	Bell 71'; Baker (yellow card) 5'; Keogh (yellow card) 60'; Cameron (yellow card) 80'	Stadium: Deepdale; Attendance: 12,269; Referee: Grant Hegley

2 April 2011 39	Coventry City	2–0	Watford	Coventry
15:00 GMT	McSheffrey 27', (yellow card) 84'; Jutkiewicz 66'; Keogh (yellow card) 73'	(Report)	Thompson (yellow card) 37'	Stadium: Ricoh Arena; Attendance: 16,519; Referee: Carl Boyeson

9 April 2011 40	Derby County	2–2	Coventry City	Derby
15:00 GMT	Davies 41'; Savage 45' (pen.)	(Report)	Gunnarsson 16'; King 39'	Stadium: Pride Park Stadium; Attendance: 25,546; Referee: Russell Booth

13 April 2011 41	Portsmouth	0–3	Coventry City	Portsmouth
17:45 GMT	Rocha (yellow card) 52'; Nugent (yellow card) 60'; Mullins (red card) 69'; Cotterill (yellow card) 84'; De Laet (yellow card) 90'	(Report)	King 19' (pen.), 70' (pen.); McSheffrey 58'; Bell (yellow card) 90'	Stadium: Fratton Park; Attendance: 13,132; Referee: Dean Whitestone

16 April 2011 42	Coventry City	2–1	Millwall	Coventry
15:00 GMT	King 7', 84'; Baker (yellow card) 82'	(Report)	Townsend 45'; Harris (red card) 48'	Stadium: Ricoh Arena; Attendance: 16,354; Referee: Roger East

22 April 2011 43	Coventry City	1–1	Scunthorpe United	Coventry
15:00 GMT	King 5'	(Report)	Núñez 38'	Stadium: Ricoh Arena; Attendance: 16,705; Referee: Anthony Bates

25 April 2011 44	Middlesbrough	2–1	Coventry City	Middlesbrough
15:00 GMT	Arca 25', (yellow card) 62'; Kink 90'	(Report)	Jutkiewicz 10'; Wood (yellow card) 78'	Stadium: Riverside Stadium; Attendance: 15,817; Referee: Gavin Ward

30 April 2011 45	Coventry City	0–0	Reading	Coventry
15:00 GMT	Gunnarsson (yellow card) 80'; Clingan (yellow card) 90'	(Report)	Mills (yellow card) 72'	Stadium: Ricoh Arena; Attendance: 22,436; Referee: James Linington

7 May 2011 46	Norwich City	2–2	Coventry City	Norwich
12:45 GMT	Holt 56'; Pacheco 62'; Surman (yellow card) 32'	(Report)	Keogh 54'; Jutkiewicz 64'	Stadium: Carrow Road; Attendance: 26,268; Referee: Darren Deadman

=== League Cup ===
10 August 2010 R1	Morecambe	2–0	Coventry City	Morecambe
19:45 GMT	Fleming 45', 61'	(Report)	Grandison (yellow card) 74'; Wood (yellow card) 78'	Stadium: Globe Arena; Attendance: 4,002; Referee: Andy Haines

=== FA Cup ===
8 January 2011 R3	Coventry City	2–1	Crystal Palace	Coventry
15:00 GMT	Eastwood 15'; Baker 17'; O'Donovan (yellow card) 86'	(Report)	Danns 81'	Stadium: Ricoh Arena; Attendance: 8,162; Referee: Craig Pawson

29 January 2011 R4	Birmingham City	3–2	Coventry City	Birmingham
15:00 GMT	Bentley 35'; Parnaby 67'; Phillips 73'	(Report)	King 11'; Wood 26'	Stadium: St Andrew's; Attendance: 16,669; Referee: Mike Dean

== Championship data ==
=== League table ===
Pos	Team	Pld	W	D	L	GF	GA	GD	Pts
16	Portsmouth	46	15	13	18	53	60	−7	58
17	Barnsley	46	14	14	18	55	66	−11	56
18	Coventry City	46	14	13	19	54	58	−4	55
19	Derby County	46	13	10	23	58	71	−13	49
20	Crystal Palace	46	12	12	22	44	69	−25	48

Updated to match(es) played on 7 May 2011. Source: The Football League
Rules for classification: 1) points; 2) goal difference; 3) number of goals scored.

=== Results summary ===
Overall								Home						Away					
Pld	W	D	L	GF	GA	GD	Pts	W	D	L	GF	GA	GD	W	D	L	GF	GA	GD
46	14	13	19	54	58	−4	55	9	5	9	27	26	+1	5	8	10	27	32	−5

Last updated: 7 May 2011.
Source: CCFC Championship Results

=== Round by round ===
Round	1	2	3	4	5	6	7	8	9	10	11	12	13	14	15	16	17	18	19	20	21	22	23	24	25	26	27	28	29	30	31	32	33	34	35	36	37	38	39	40	41	42	43	44	45	46
Ground	H	A	H	A	H	A	A	H	H	A	A	H	H	A	H	A	A	H	A	H	A	H	A	H	H	A	H	A	H	A	H	H	A	H	A	H	A	A	H	A	A	H	H	A	H	A
Result	W	D	W	L	D	L	W	L	W	D	W	L	W	W	L	L	L	W	W	W	D	L	L	L	D	L	D	L	L	L	W	L	D	L	D	L	D	L	W	D	W	W	D	L	D	D
Position	4	3	4	8	9	14	11	13	9	9	7	8	6	4	5	6	11	9	6	5	5	6	6	7	9	11	11	13	15	16	14	16	17	19	18	19	19	20	17	18	17	16	16	16	16	18

Updated to match(es) played on 7 May 2011. Source: Championship Results
A = Away; H = Home; W = Win; D = Draw; L = Loss

== Season statistics ==
=== Starts and goals ===
No.	Pos	Nat	Player	Total		Championship		League Cup		FA Cup	
No.	Pos	Nat	Player	Apps	Goals	Apps	Goals	Apps	Goals	Apps	Goals
1	GK	(Ireland) EIR	Keiren Westwood	43	0	41+0	0	0+0	0	2+0	0
2	DF	(Ireland) EIR	Richard Keogh	48	1	46+0	1	0+0	0	2+0	0
3	DF	(Ireland) EIR	Stephen O'Halloran	13	0	10+1	0	0+0	0	2+0	0
4	MF	(Northern Ireland) NIR	Sammy Clingan	28	0	26+2	0	0+0	0	0+0	0
5	MF	(Ireland) EIR	Lee Carsley	25	0	25+0	0	0+0	0	0+0	0
6	DF	(Scotland) SCO	James McPake	13	0	12+0	0	1+0	0	0+0	0
7	MF	(Ireland) EIR	David Bell	23	2	20+2	2	1+0	0	0+0	0
8	MF	(Ireland) EIR	Michael Doyle	19	1	15+3	1	0+0	0	1+0	0
9	FW	(Jamaica) JAM	Marlon King	29	13	24+4	12	0+0	0	1+0	1
10	FW	(Wales) WAL	Freddy Eastwood	29	6	14+13	5	0+0	0	1+1	1
11	FW	(England) ENG	Lukas Jutkiewicz	43	9	34+8	9	0+0	0	1+0	0
12	MF	(Ireland) EIR	Gary Deegan	1	0	0+1	0	0+0	0	0+0	0
13	GK	(Ireland) EIR	Colin Doyle (On loan from Birmingham City)	1	0	0+0	0	1+0	0	0+0	0
13	GK	(Scotland) SCO	Iain Turner (On loan from Everton)	2	0	2+0	0	0+0	0	0+0	0
13	GK	(England) ENG	Lee Burge	0	0	0+0	0	0+0	0	0+0	0
14	DF	(England) ENG	Chris Hussey (On loan to Crewe Alexandra)	12	0	8+3	0	1+0	0	0+0	0
15	DF	(England) ENG	Martin Cranie	38	0	32+4	0	0+0	0	2+0	0
16	MF	(England) ENG	Isaac Osbourne	0	0	0+0	0	0+0	0	0+0	0
17	MF	(Iceland) ISL	Aron Gunnarsson	44	4	37+5	4	0+0	0	2+0	0
18	MF	(England) ENG	Carl Baker	35	2	19+13	1	1+0	0	2+0	1
19	FW	(England) ENG	Gary McSheffrey	35	8	30+3	8	0+0	0	2+0	0
20	DF	(England) ENG	Ben Turner	14	4	14+0	4	0+0	0	0+0	0
21	MF	(Scotland) SCO	Michael McIndoe (On loan to Milton Keynes Dons)	7	0	0+6	0	1+0	0	0+0	0
22	FW	(England) ENG	Clive Platt	37	3	22+12	3	1+0	0	1+1	0
23	GK	(Australia) AUS	Danny Ireland	1	0	0+1	0	0+0	0	0+0	0
24	DF	(England) ENG	Richard Wood	43	2	35+5	1	1+0	0	2+0	1
25	DF	(England) ENG	Jermaine Grandison (On loan to Tranmere Rovers & Shrewsbury Town)	1	0	0+0	0	1+0	0	0+0	0
26	MF	(England) ENG	Jordan Clarke	22	1	12+9	1	1+0	0	0+0	0
27	FW	(England) ENG	Danny Ward (On loan from Bolton Wanderers)	5	0	4+1	0	0+0	0	0+0	0
29	FW	(Ireland) EIR	Roy O'Donovan	4	0	0+2	0	1+0	0	0+1	0
30	DF	(England) ENG	Nathan Cameron	26	0	22+3	0	0+0	0	0+1	0
31	FW	(England) ENG	Shaun Jeffers (On loan to Cheltenham Town & Cambridge United)	0	0	0+0	0	0+0	0	0+0	0
32	FW	(England) ENG	Callum Wilson (On loan to Kettering Town)	1	0	0+1	0	0+0	0	0+0	0
33	GK	(Ireland) EIR	Michael Quirke (On loan to Nuneaton Town)	4	0	3+1	0	0+0	0	0+0	0
36	MF	(England) ENG	Josh Ruffels	0	0	0+0	0	0+0	0	0+0	0
37	MF	(England) ENG	Luke Bottomer	0	0	0+0	0	0+0	0	0+0	0
38	DF	(England) ENG	Cyrus Christie (On loan to Nuneaton Town & Hinckley United)	1	0	0+0	0	0+1	0	0+0	0
39	FW	(England) ENG	Jonson Clarke-Harris	1	0	0+0	0	0+1	0	0+0	0
40	MF	(England) ENG	Conor Thomas (On loan to Liverpool)	2	0	0+0	0	0+0	0	1+1	0
41	MF	(Burundi) BDI	Gaël Bigirimana	0	0	0+0	0	0+0	0	0+0	0
42	MF	(England) ENG	Conor Grogan	0	0	0+0	0	0+0	0	0+0	0

Notes:

- Player substitutions are not included.

=== Goalscorers ===
No.	Flag	Pos	Name	Championship	League Cup	FA Cup	Total
9	(Jamaica)	FW	Marlon King	12	0	1	13
11	(England)	FW	Lukas Jutkiewicz	9	0	0	9
19	(England)	MF	Gary McSheffrey	8	0	0	8
10	(Wales)	FW	Freddy Eastwood	5	0	1	6
17	(Iceland)	MF	Aron Gunnarsson	4	0	0	4
20	(England)	DF	Ben Turner	4	0	0	4
22	(England)	FW	Clive Platt	3	0	0	3
7	(Republic of Ireland)	MF	David Bell	2	0	0	2
18	(England)	MF	Carl Baker	1	0	1	2
24	(England)	DF	Richard Wood	1	0	1	2
			Own goal	2	0	0	2
2	(Republic of Ireland)	DF	Richard Keogh	1	0	0	1
8	(Republic of Ireland)	MF	Michael Doyle	1	0	0	1
26	(England)	DF	Jordan Clarke	1	0	0	1

=== Assists ===
No.	Flag	Pos	Name	Championship	League Cup	FA Cup	Total
17	(Iceland)	MF	Aron Gunnarsson	7	0	0	7
2	(Republic of Ireland)	DF	Richard Keogh	5	0	0	5
22	(England)	FW	Clive Platt	5	0	0	5
19	(England)	MF	Gary McSheffrey	2	0	2	4
4	(Northern Ireland)	MF	Sammy Clingan	3	0	0	3
7	(Republic of Ireland)	MF	David Bell	2	0	0	2
14	(England)	DF	Chris Hussey	2	0	0	2
5	(Republic of Ireland)	MF	Lee Carsley	1	0	0	1
8	(Republic of Ireland)	MF	Michael Doyle	1	0	0	1
9	(Jamaica)	FW	Marlon King	1	0	0	1
10	(Wales)	FW	Freddy Eastwood	0	0	1	1
11	(England)	FW	Lukas Jutkiewicz	1	0	0	1
21	(Scotland)	MF	Michael McIndoe	1	0	0	1
24	(England)	DF	Richard Wood	1	0	0	1

=== Yellow cards ===
No.	Flag	Pos	Name	Championship	League Cup	FA Cup	Total
19	(England)	MF	Gary McSheffrey	6	0	0	(yellow card) 6
5	(Republic of Ireland)	MF	Lee Carsley	5	0	0	(yellow card) 5
18	(England)	MF	Carl Baker	5	0	0	(yellow card) 5
24	(England)	DF	Richard Wood	4	1	0	(yellow card) 5
4	(Northern Ireland)	MF	Sammy Clingan	5	0	0	(yellow card) 5
20	(England)	DF	Ben Turner	4	0	0	(yellow card) 4
6	(Scotland)	DF	James McPake	4	0	0	(yellow card) 4
3	(Republic of Ireland)	DF	Stephen O'Halloran	4	0	0	(yellow card) 4
30	(England)	DF	Nathan Cameron	4	0	0	(yellow card) 4
2	(Republic of Ireland)	DF	Richard Keogh	4	0	0	(yellow card) 4
8	(Republic of Ireland)	MF	Michael Doyle	3	0	0	(yellow card) 3
17	(Iceland)	MF	Aron Gunnarsson	3	0	0	(yellow card) 3
11	(England)	FW	Lukas Jutkiewicz	2	0	0	(yellow card) 2
22	(England)	FW	Clive Platt	2	0	0	(yellow card) 2
26	(England)	DF	Jordan Clarke	2	0	0	(yellow card) 2
7	(Republic of Ireland)	MF	David Bell	2	0	0	(yellow card) 2
25	(England)	DF	Jermaine Grandison	0	1	0	(yellow card) 1
10	(Wales)	FW	Freddy Eastwood	1	0	0	(yellow card) 1
21	(Scotland)	MF	Michael McIndoe	1	0	0	(yellow card) 1
29	(Republic of Ireland)	FW	Roy O'Donovan	0	0	1	(yellow card) 1
9	(Jamaica)	FW	Marlon King	1	0	0	(yellow card) 1
15	(England)	DF	Martin Cranie	1	0	0	(yellow card) 1
1	(Republic of Ireland)	GK	Keiren Westwood	1	0	0	(yellow card) 1

=== Red cards ===
No.	Flag	Pos	Name	Championship	League Cup	FA Cup	Total
9	(Jamaica)	FW	Marlon King	2	0	0	(red card) 2
18	(England)	MF	Carl Baker	1	0	0	(red card) 1
17	(Iceland)	MF	Aron Gunnarsson	1	0	0	(red card) 1
15	(England)	DF	Martin Cranie	1	0	0	(red card) 1

=== Captains ===
No.	Pos.	Name	Starts
5	MF	(Republic of Ireland) Lee Carsley	25
4	MF	(Northern Ireland) Sammy Clingan	8
1	GK	(Republic of Ireland) Keiren Westwood	7
8	MF	(Republic of Ireland) Michael Doyle	4
24	DF	(England) Richard Wood	4
6	DF	(Scotland) James McPake	1

=== Penalties Awarded ===
Date	Success?	Penalty Taker	Opponent	Competition
2010-08-14	✓	(England) Lukas Jutkiewicz	Watford	Championship
2010-08-21	✓	(England) Lukas Jutkiewicz	Derby County	Championship
2010-10-16	✓	(England) Lukas Jutkiewicz	Ipswich Town	Championship
2010-12-03	✓	(Jamaica) Marlon King	Middlesbrough	Championship
2011-04-12	✓	(Jamaica) Marlon King	Portsmouth	Championship
2011-04-12	✓	(Jamaica) Marlon King	Portsmouth	Championship

=== Suspensions served ===
Date	Matches Missed	Suspended Player	Reason	Missed Opponents
2010-09-11	1	(England) Carl Baker	Sent off vs. Millwall	Leicester City (H)
2010-12-18	1	(Republic of Ireland) Lee Carsley	Reached 5 yellow cards	Norwich City (H)
2010-12-26	3	(Iceland) Aron Gunnarsson	Sent off vs. Norwich City	Cardiff City (A), Queens Park Rangers (H), Ipswich Town (H)
2011-01-01	1	(England) Gary McSheffrey	Reached 5 yellow cards	Ipswich Town (H)
2011-01-03	3	(Jamaica) Marlon King	Sent off vs. Ipswich Town	Barnsley (A), Crystal Palace (H), Sheffield United (H)
2011-03-05	1	(England) Martin Cranie	Sent off vs. Leicester City	Bristol City (H)
2011-03-08	4	(Jamaica) Marlon King	Sent off vs. Bristol City	Doncaster Rovers (A), Hull City (H), Burnley (A), Preston North End (A)

=== Monthly & Weekly Awards ===
Championship Team of the Week	09-08-2010	Freddy Eastwood
Championship Team of the Week	23-08-2010	Ben Turner
Championship Team of the Week	01-11-2010	Keiren Westwood
Championship Team of the Week	29-11-2010	James McPake
Championship Team of the Week	29-11-2010	Gary McSheffrey
Championship Team of the Week	06-12-2010	Keiren Westwood
Championship Team of the Week	06-12-2010	James McPake
Championship Team of the Week	18-04-2011	Marlon King

=== End of Season Awards ===
Player of the Season Award	Marlon King
Young Player of the Season Award	Lukas Jutkiewicz
Players' Player of the Season Award	Richard Keogh
Top Scorer Award	Marlon King
Goal of the Season Award	Gary McSheffrey
Community Player of the Season Award	Carl Baker
Outstanding Achievement Award	Jimmy Hill
Coventry Supporters' Club Player of the Season Award	Gary McSheffrey
London Supporters' Club Player of the Season Award	Richard Keogh
Welsh Supporters' Club Player of the Season Award	Keiren Westwood
Irish Supporters' Club Player of the Season Award	Keiren Westwood
Former Players Association's Player of the Year Award	Ben Turner

=== Overall ===
Games played	49 (46 Championship, 1 League Cup, 2 FA Cup)
Games won	15 (14 Championship, 0 League Cup, 1 FA Cup)
Games drawn	13 (13 Championship, 0 League Cup, 0 FA Cup)
Games lost	21 (19 Championship, 1 League Cup, 1 FA Cup)
Goals scored	58 (54 Championship, 0 League Cup, 4 FA Cup)
Goals conceded	64 (58 Championship, 2 League Cup, 4 FA Cup)
Goal difference	−6
Yellow cards	67 (64 Championship, 2 League Cup, 1 FA Cup)
Red cards	5 (5 Championship, 0 League Cup, 0 FA Cup)
Worst discipline	(Jamaica) Marlon King (1 (yellow card) , 2 (red card) )
Best result	W 3–0 (H) v Barnsley – Championship – 23 October 2010
	W 3–0 (A) v Portsmouth – Championship – 12 April 2011
Worst result	L 4–1 (H) v Bristol City – Championship – 5 March 2011
Most appearances	(Republic of Ireland) Richard Keogh (48 appearances)
Top scorer	(Jamaica) Marlon King (13 goals)
Points	55 / 138 (39.86%)

== Transfers ==
=== Transfers in ===
Player	From	Date	Fee
(England) Gary McSheffrey	Birmingham City	1 July 2010	Free
(Republic of Ireland) Stephen O'Halloran	Aston Villa	1 July 2010	Free
(Republic of Ireland) Roy O'Donovan	Sunderland	1 July 2010	Free
(Republic of Ireland) Richard Keogh	Carlisle United	1 July 2010	Undisclosed
(Republic of Ireland) Lee Carsley	Birmingham City	23 July 2010	Free
(England) Lukas Jutkiewicz	Everton	26 July 2010	Undisclosed
(England) Clive Platt	Colchester United	28 July 2010	Nominal
(England) Courtney Richards	Romulus	2 September 2010	Scholarship
(Jamaica) Marlon King	Wigan Athletic	20 September 2010	Free

=== Transfers out ===
Player	To	Date	Fee
(England) Ashley Cain	Mansfield Town	30 June 2010	Free
(England) Curtis Wynter	Jerez Industrial	30 June 2010	Free
(England) Marcus Hall	Northampton Town	30 June 2010	Free
(England) Elliott Ward	Norwich City	1 July 2010	Free
(England) Stephen Wright	Brentford	30 June 2010	Free
(Republic of Ireland) Clinton Morrison	Sheffield Wednesday	30 June 2010	Free
(Greece) Dimitrios Konstantopoulos	AO Kerkyra	30 June 2010	Free
(England) Joel Grandison	Solihull Moors	30 June 2010	Free
(Republic of Ireland) Michael Doyle	Sheffield United	25 January 2011	Free
(England) Jermaine Grandison	Shrewsbury Town	31 January 2011	Nominal
(England) Luke Bottomer	Worcester City	1 April 2011	Free

=== Loans in ===
Player	From	Date From	Date Till
(Republic of Ireland) Colin Doyle	Birmingham City	10 August 2010	11 August 2010
(Scotland) Iain Turner	Everton	14 August 2010	14 September 2010
(England) Danny Ward	Bolton Wanderers	10 September 2010	1 January 2011

=== Loans out ===
Player	To	Date From	Date Till
(England) Shaun Jeffers	Cheltenham Town	6 August 2010	4 September 2010
(England) Jermaine Grandison	Tranmere Rovers	31 August 2010	30 September 2010
(England) Jermaine Grandison	Tranmere Rovers	30 October 2010	8 December 2010
(Scotland) Michael McIndoe	Milton Keynes Dons	12 November 2010	13 January 2011
(England) Chris Hussey	Crewe Alexandra	24 November 2010	26 November 2010
(England) Jermaine Grandison	Shrewsbury Town	14 January 2011	10 February 2011
(England) Callum Wilson	Kettering Town	14 January 2011	11 February 2011
(England) Cyrus Christie	Nuneaton Town	14 January 2011	10 February 2011
(Republic of Ireland) Michael Quirke	Nuneaton Town	28 January 2011	28 February 2011
(England) Conor Thomas	Liverpool	31 January 2011	9 May 2011
(England) Cyrus Christie	Hinckley United	14 February 2011	9 May 2011
(England) Shaun Jeffers	Cambridge United	17 February 2011	17 March 2011

=== Trials ===
Player	From	Situation	Trial Date
(Netherlands Antilles) Orlando Smeekes	Carl Zeiss Jena	Trial	July 2010
(Germany) Carsten Nulle	Carl Zeiss Jena	Trial	July 2010
(Australia) Lawrence Thomas	Australian Institute of Sport	Free agent	July 2010
(Denmark) Kevin Stuhr Ellegaard	Randers	Free agent	July 2010
(France) Francis Laurent	Southend United	Free agent	July 2010
(New Zealand) Jason Walker	Rotorua Football Academy	Free agent	March 2011

== Kit profile ==
Supplier: Puma
Sponsor(s): City Link

Home Strip	Away Strip
