= Marlon King =

Jamaican-English footballer (born 1980)

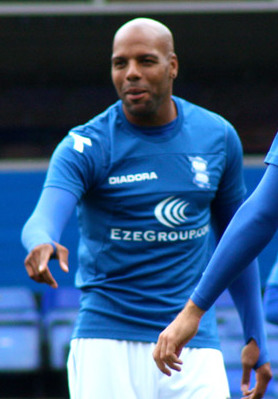
- In pre-season with Birmingham City, 2012

Personal information
- Full name: Marlon Francis King
- Date of birth: 26 April 1980 (age 46)
- Place of birth: Dulwich, London, England
- Height: 6 ft 1 in (1.85 m)
- Position: Striker

Senior career*
Years	Team	Apps	(Gls)
1998–2000	Barnet	53	(14)
2000–2003	Gillingham	101	(40)
2003–2005	Nottingham Forest	50	(10)
2005	→ Leeds United (loan)	9	(0)
2005	→ Watford (loan)	21	(12)
2005–2008	Watford	81	(36)
2008–2009	Wigan Athletic	18	(1)
2008–2009	→ Hull City (loan)	20	(5)
2009	→ Middlesbrough (loan)	13	(2)
2010–2011	Coventry City	28	(12)
2011–2013	Birmingham City	67	(29)
2013	Sheffield United	8	(1)
Total		469	(162)

International career
2004–2013	Jamaica	24	(12)
- * Club domestic league appearances and goals

Marlon Francis King (born 26 April 1980) is a former professional footballer who played as a striker.

Born and raised in south London, he started his career in non-League football with Dulwich Hamlet. He played for Barnet, Gillingham, Leeds United and Nottingham Forest before moving to Watford in 2005. At Watford he was the Football League Championship top scorer, and was voted Watford player of the season as the club earned promotion to the Premier League. King joined Wigan Athletic in 2008, and subsequently spent loan spells at Hull City and Middlesbrough. He joined Coventry City in September 2010, following his release from prison, and made 29 appearances for the club before controversially switching to Birmingham City in June 2011. He made 79 appearances for Birmingham, before suffering a series of injuries during the 2012–13 season that prevented him from playing again, leaving the club in August 2013 by mutual consent. King has also played and scored for the Jamaica national team.

King has served three jail sentences, and has a number of other criminal convictions including: theft from a person and from a car, criminal damage, and attempting to obtain property by deception; fraudulent use of vehicle licence document, driving without insurance, speeding, drink driving; a wounding incident while playing amateur football, and two cases involving assault of young women rejecting his advances in the Soho area of London. King had his playing contract cancelled by Wigan after being convicted of the sexual assault charges and being sentenced to eighteen months in prison.

== Club career ==
=== Early career ===
King started his career at Dulwich Hamlet, before becoming a trainee at Barnet, where he would go on to make 60 first team appearances

=== Gillingham ===
King signed for First Division side Gillingham in July 2000 for £255,000. In August 2001 he signed a new four-year contract with the Kent side.

In May 2002 King was jailed for 18 months for driving a stolen car, but returned to the Gillingham team in October 2002 after he was released on appeal.

In his three years with the club he scored 40 goals in 101 league appearances, finishing as their top scorer for consecutive seasons.

=== Nottingham Forest ===
King left Priestfield to join Nottingham Forest in November 2003 for a fee of £950,000. He scored 15 goals in 57 games. He struggled to win over the fans at Nottingham Forest, before netting an injury-time winning goal in an emotional match against West Ham United, the first after the death of Brian Clough.

King was loaned to Leeds United in March 2005 for the remainder of the 2004–05 season. Whilst at Leeds, manager Kevin Blackwell mainly played King out of position on the wing, and as a result King failed to net a single goal for Leeds, including missing a penalty kick against Leicester City. In total he played nine games for Leeds and returned to Nottingham Forest in the summer of 2005 after his loan spell ended.

=== Watford ===
In the summer of 2005 King was loaned to Watford for six months, with an option to buy in the January transfer window. He impressed at the Hertfordshire club, scoring 12 goals in 21 games as Watford featured in the upper reaches of the table. King scored his first goal for the Hornets in a 3–3 draw away at Plymouth Argyle on 9 August, and followed this up with two goals at Cardiff City in his next match.

The transfer was made permanent for £500,000 in January, and King went on to finish top scorer in the 2005–06 Championship with 21 goals. Watford finished third, with King scoring in the 3–0 semi-final first leg win over Crystal Palace. He played in the second leg, and in the final against Leeds United, which Watford won 3–0 to win promotion to the FA Premier League. King was named the club's Player of the Season.

King scored his debut Premier League goal against West Ham United in the second game of the new season. His second Premier League goal, the first in a 3–3 draw with Fulham on 2 October 2006 marked his 100th goal in domestic competition. In the following game, away at Arsenal, he sustained a knee injury which kept him out of the next three games. During his return to fitness he suffered a relapse, and in an exploratory operation it was discovered that some bone had flaked away from his femur. The injury kept him out of action for six months, and he did not return until 14 April 2007, when he came on as a substitute in the 4–1 FA Cup semi–final loss to Manchester United at Villa Park. He scored in the final two games of the season, away at Reading and at home to Newcastle United to bring his season tally to four.

Watford were relegated and returned to the Championship for the 2007–08 season. With Watford topping the table for much of the first half of the season, King scored ten goals before the end of 2007, including five in successive games in October.

=== Wigan Athletic ===
King had a medical at Fulham in January 2008, which Fulham at the time said he had failed. Following King's conviction in October 2009 Fulham manager Roy Hodgson said "I think we got lucky in that we didn't sign him. There was a problem with the medical and it also became a problem when we found out he had a jail sentence. Mohamed Al Fayed was not at all keen on that so the transfer was allowed to collapse and he went to Wigan instead." He signed for Wigan Athletic on a three-and-a-half-year contract for an undisclosed fee on 25 January 2008. Watford chairman Graham Simpson said that King had left for a fee of £3million rising to £4million, dependent on appearances and Wigan keeping their Premier League status, and it was reported that King doubled his wages to £40,000 per week. King scored his first and what turned out to be only goal for Wigan against Blackburn Rovers on 22 March.

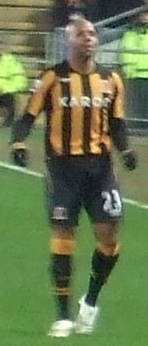
King playing for Hull City in 2009

In August 2008, Premier League newcomers Hull City bid an undisclosed amount for King, which Wigan accepted. City agreed personal terms with King, but the move fell through as he was unable to negotiate the terms of his exit with Wigan. Hull instead took King on a season-long loan. He scored his first goal for City, a penalty, on 13 September against Newcastle United, adding a second goal in the second half to win the match 2–1. King's loan at Hull was cut short after he reacted in an "unacceptable manner" when told he was not in the starting line-up for a match against Arsenal, and he was sent home rather than taking his place among the substitutes.

On 22 January 2009, King's loan spell with Hull ended and he signed a loan deal with Middlesbrough. He made his debut against Chelsea on 28 January. He scored his first goal for Middlesbrough on 14 March against Portsmouth. King grabbed a goal against his old club Hull on 11 April in a win for the Teessiders. However, the season ended with Middlesbrough's relegation from the Premier League. King returned to Wigan in the summer of 2009 season after his loan spell ended. He mainly found himself on the bench for Roberto Martínez's side. He was sacked in October 2009, following his conviction and sentencing for sexual assault.

=== Coventry City ===
Upon his release from jail former manager Aidy Boothroyd invited King to train with Coventry City to regain his fitness. After impressing during training King and Coventry City became involved in lengthy contract talks which took almost two months to sort out. On 20 September 2010, King signed a one-year deal. King scored his first goal for the Sky Blues from the penalty spot to win the game against Middlesbrough on 4 December, and finished the season as the club's top scorer with 13 goals. He was also chosen Player of the Year.

=== Birmingham City ===
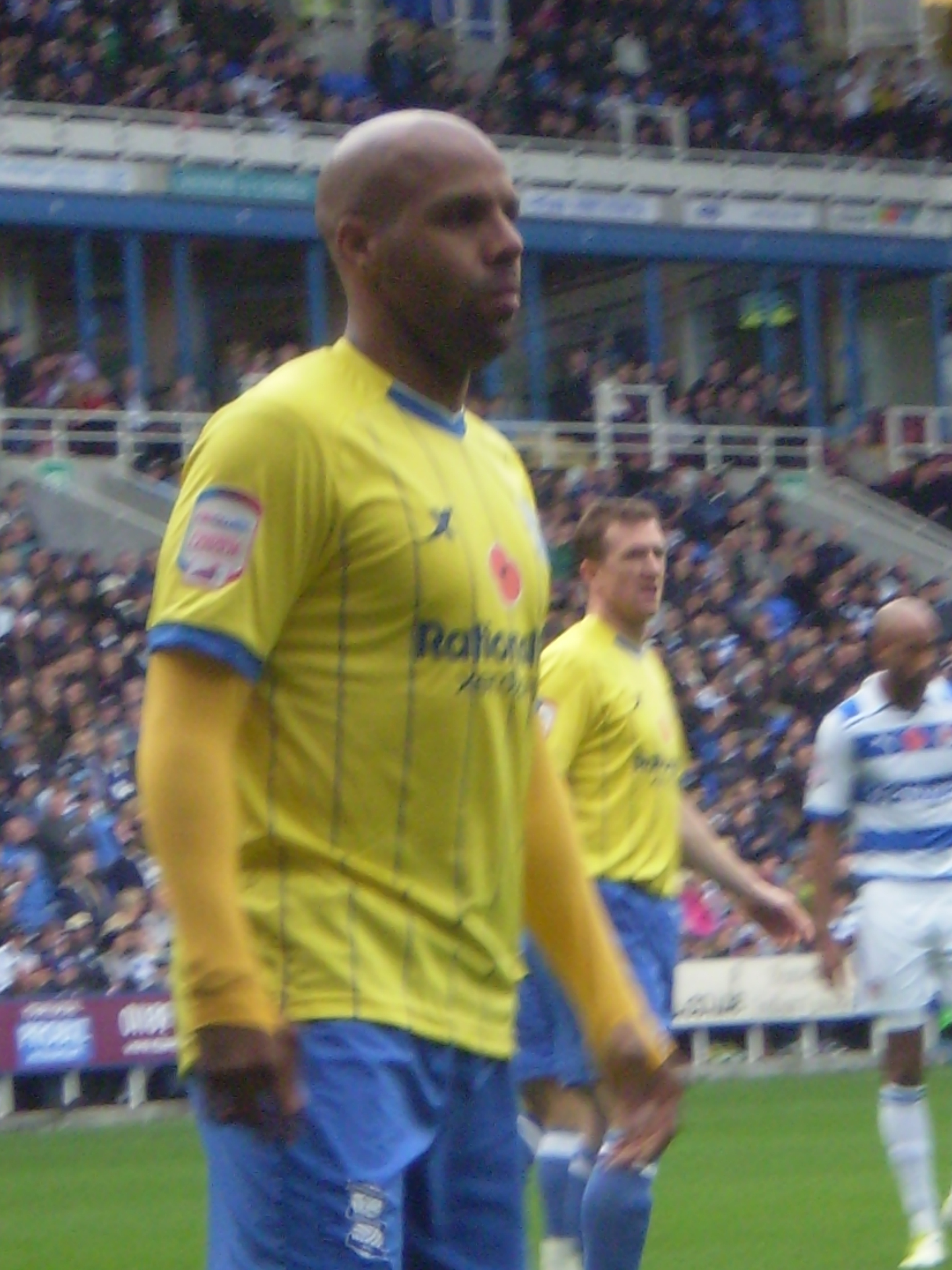
King playing for Birmingham City in 2011

With his Coventry contract about to expire, King was reported to have verbally agreed a new deal with the club. However, on 10 June 2011, he agreed a three-year contract with Birmingham City, citing the opportunity to play in the Europa League as a major factor in his decision. The free transfer, under the Bosman ruling, was formally completed on 1 July. Coventry's chairman and manager felt "betrayed" by the player's actions.

He suffered knee ligament damage in pre-season training which delayed his Birmingham debut until 11 September, when he played the last half-hour of a 3–0 home win over Millwall. King scored his first goal in European competition on his first start for Birmingham, in the 3–1 home defeat to Braga in the Europa League group stage, and his first League goal for the club on 16 October, a penalty to open the scoring in a 2–0 win against Leicester City. King finished the season with 18 goals and 12 assists as Birmingham reached the play-off semi-final.

King scored the first senior hat-trick of his career to secure a draw after Birmingham were 3–0 down after 19 minutes away to Millwall in October 2012. This was the start of a scoring run of nine goals in as many games, finishing with Birmingham's 3–2 defeat of third-placed Middlesbrough in December, in which King was fouled for and converted a penalty just before half-time to level the scores, and ran onto a through ball by Peter Løvenkrands to score the late winner with what the Birmingham Mail described as a "clinical finish". Although put up for sale in January, a bid from Shanghai Shenhua was rejected in February. However, in March, his season was brought to a premature close due to a long-term knee injury deteriorated, requiring an operation. On 28 August 2013, it was announced that Marlon King would be leaving Birmingham, after his contract was terminated by mutual consent in order to reduce the club's wage bill.

=== Sheffield United ===
Having initially been rejected by the club, in September 2013 King signed deal with Sheffield United to remain with the League One club for the remainder of the season. Having made his United debut in a 1–0 home loss to Preston North End, he scored his first goal for his new club two games later in a 1–1 draw with Crawley Town at Bramall Lane. King quickly fell out of favour following the arrival of new manager Nigel Clough however, and following a spell on the sidelines due to a knee injury he was released in December 2013.

== International career ==
In 2004 King played an important part in Jamaica's unsuccessful attempt to qualify for the 2006 World Cup, scoring six goals in eight games. He played for Jamaica in the friendly against Ghana on 29 May 2006 which they lost 4–1. He was named in the squad to face England in a friendly on 3 June 2006, but was sent home for an alleged breach of discipline. Jamaica lost the match 6–0.

As a result of the incident, the Jamaican Football Federation banned King from international football until May 2008. When Captain Horace Burrell returned as the JFF president he lifted the ban. King played in Jamaica's 1–1 draw with Costa Rica in February 2008, where he provided the cross for Jamaica's goal. King also played for Jamaica in a friendly against Trinidad and Tobago scoring a goal and captaining the team in the absence of Ricardo Gardner due to injury.

King made his first appearance for Jamaica since 2009 as a second-half substitute in a 1–0 friendly defeat to Panama on 27 May 2012, and played in the next game, again as a substitute. He and Chris Humphrey were then suspended from the next two World Cup qualifiers for breaking curfew. He was not selected again after the suspension, and announced his retirement from international football in November 2012. He scored 12 goals from 22 senior international appearances. After the resignation of Theodore Whitmore, new coach Winfried Schäfer recalled King to the team for the World Cup qualifiers in September 2013.

== Personal life ==
King is married to Julie, a former Miss Zambia, and has three children.

=== Incidents and legal cases ===
While on loan to Hull City, King was alleged to have headbutted teammate Dean Windass in a casino in Scarborough. Hull City stated that the matter had been dealt with internally, and both players remained with the club. Windass later described the incident as a "storm in a teacup".

As of October 2009, King had convictions for 14 offences. He received fines, driving bans, community service sentences, a rehabilitation order and orders to pay compensation on convictions including: theft from a person and from a car, criminal damage, and attempting to obtain property by deception; fraudulent use of vehicle licence document, driving without insurance, speeding, drink driving; a wounding incident while playing amateur football, and two cases involving assault of young women rejecting his advances in the Soho area of London.

Three cases led to imprisonment. In May 2002 he received an eighteen-month prison sentence for receiving stolen goods, in relation to a BMW convertible that he was found driving, but was found not guilty of a charge of assaulting a police officer in a related case. His solicitor commented that "His reputation will be tarnished forever, whatever success he achieves, he'll always be referred to in a Tyson-esque way as someone who has had a criminal past and that is a considerable penalty." Gillingham continued to pay his salary while he was in jail, and supported in his appeal, which resulted in the sentence being reduced to nine months, with King being released on licence after five months, returning to the Gillingham team within two days of his release.

In December 2008, again in the Soho area, King was arrested on suspicion of punching a 20-year-old female university student in the face, causing a broken nose and split lip for which she was treated in hospital. He was later convicted of sexual assault and assault occasioning actual bodily harm, and sentenced to 18 months in prison and placed on the Sex Offender Register for seven years. Wigan Athletic immediately initiated the cancellation of his contract. King's agent, Tony Finnigan, said he was confident that his client would find a club on his release, and accused the Professional Footballers' Association (PFA) of failing to offer support. Gordon Taylor, the chief executive of the PFA, said that the PFA did not represent players when they have broken the law and been convicted on non-footballing matters. It would support members with anger management or other issues if approached but no approach had been made by King. After his release, King made an appeal against the conviction which was unsuccessful.

King was arrested and bailed once more in April 2013 after a car crash which left one man seriously injured, and in July of the same year, he was again arrested in connection with a hit-and-run incident which had left a second man injured. King pleaded 'not guilty' to the first incident in November of the same year and had a trial date set for March 2014. On 15 May 2014, King of Torksey, Lincolnshire, was sentenced to 18 months in prison and banned from driving for three years.

Following his release from prison, King moved to Zambia with his family.

== Career statistics ==
=== Club ===
As of 2 November 2013

Appearances and goals by club, season and competition
Club	Season	League			FA Cup		League Cup		Other		Total	
Club	Season	Division	Apps	Goals	Apps	Goals	Apps	Goals	Apps	Goals	Apps	Goals
Barnet	1998–99	Third Division	22	6	1	0	0	0	1 (Note: Appearance in Football League Trophy)	0	24	6
Barnet	1999–2000	Third Division	31	8	0	0	2	0	3 (Note: Two appearances in Football League Trophy, one in Football League Third Division play-offs)	0	36	8
Barnet	Total		53	14	1	0	2	0	4	0	60	14
Gillingham	2000–01	First Division	38	15	2	0	3	0	—		43	15
Gillingham	2001–02	First Division	42	17	3	1	3	2	—		48	20
Gillingham	2002–03	First Division	10	4	1	2	1	1	—		12	7
Gillingham	2003–04	First Division	11	4	0	0	2	1	—		13	5
Gillingham	Total		101	40	6	3	9	4	—		116	47
Nottingham Forest	2003–04	First Division	24	5	2	1	0	0	—		26	6
Nottingham Forest	2004–05	Championship	26	5	2	1	3	3	—		31	9
Nottingham Forest	Total		50	10	4	2	3	3	—		57	15
Leeds United	2004–05	Championship	9	0	0	0	0	0	—		9	0
Watford	2005–06	Championship	41	21	1	0	0	0	3 (Note: Appearances in Football League Championship play-offs)	1	45	22
Watford	2006–07	Premier League	13	4	1	0	0	0	—		14	4
Watford	2007–08	Championship	27	11	1	0	0	0	0	0	28	11
Watford	Total		81	36	3	0	0	0	3	1	87	37
Wigan Athletic	2007–08	Premier League	15	1	0	0	0	0	—		15	1
Wigan Athletic	2008–09	Premier League	0	0	0	0	0	0	—		0	0
Wigan Athletic	2009–10	Premier League	3	0	0	0	1	0	—		4	0
Wigan Athletic	Total		18	1	0	0	1	0	—		19	1
Hull City (loan)	2008–09	Premier League	20	5	1	0	1	0	—		22	5
Middlesbrough (loan)	2008–09	Premier League	13	2	0	0	0	0	—		13	2
Coventry City	2010–11	Championship	28	12	1	1	0	0	—		29	13
Birmingham City	2011–12	Championship	40	16	1	0	1	0	7 (Note: Five appearances and two goals in the Europa League two appearances in the Football League Championship play-offs)	2	49	18
Birmingham City	2012–13	Championship	27	13	1	0	2	1	—		30	14
Birmingham City	2013–14	Championship	0	0	—		0	0	—		0	0
Birmingham City	Total		67	29	2	0	3	1	7	2	79	32
Sheffield United	2013–14	League One	8	1	0	0	0	0	1 (Note: Appearance in Football League Trophy)	0	9	1
Career total			448	150	18	6	19	9	15	2	500	167

=== International ===
Scores and results list Jamaica's goal tally first.

No	Date	Venue	Opponent	Score	Result	Competition
1.	28 April 2004	Independence Park, Kingston, Jamaica	Venezuela	1–0	2–1	Friendly
2.	12 June 2004	Miami Orange Bowl, Miami, USA	Haiti	1–0	1–1	2006 FIFA World Cup qualification
3.	20 June 2004	Independence Park, Kingston, Jamaica	Haiti	1–0	3–0	2006 FIFA World Cup qualification
4.	20 June 2004	Independence Park, Kingston, Jamaica	Haiti	2–0	3–0	2006 FIFA World Cup qualification
5.	20 June 2004	Independence Park, Kingston, Jamaica	Haiti	3–0	3–0	2006 FIFA World Cup qualification
6.	8 September 2004	Estadio Cuscatlán, San Salvador, El Salvador	El Salvador	1–0	3–0	2006 FIFA World Cup qualification
7.	8 September 2004	Estadio Cuscatlán, San Salvador, El Salvador	El Salvador	2–0	3–0	2006 FIFA World Cup qualification
8.	26 March 2008	Independence Park, Kingston, Jamaica	Trinidad and Tobago	1–0	2–2	Friendly
9.	3 June 2008	Independence Park, Kingston, Jamaica	Saint Vincent and the Grenadines	2–0	5–1	Friendly
10.	3 June 2008	Independence Park, Kingston, Jamaica	Saint Vincent and the Grenadines	3–0	5–1	Friendly
11.	15 June 2008	Independence Park, Kingston, Jamaica	Bahamas	3–0	7–0	2010 FIFA World Cup qualification
12.	19 November 2008	Independence Park, Kingston, Jamaica	Canada	2–0	3–0	2010 FIFA World Cup qualification

== Honours ==
Watford

- Football League Championship play-offs: 2006

Individual

- Football League Championship Golden Boot: 2005–06
- Football League Championship Player of the Month: January 2006, January 2008
- PFA Team of the Year: 2005–06 Championship
- Coventry City Player of the Season: 2010–11
- Watford Player of the Season: 2005–06
