= James McPake =

Footballer (born 1984)

Personal information
- Date of birth: 24 June 1984 (age 42)
- Place of birth: Bellshill, Scotland
- Position: Central defender

Youth career
- 2000–2004: Livingston

Senior career*
Years	Team	Apps	(Gls)
2004–2009	Livingston	100	(6)
2006	→ Greenock Morton (loan)	10	(2)
2009–2012	Coventry City	68	(1)
2012	→ Hibernian (loan)	11	(0)
2012–2014	Hibernian	32	(2)
2014–2018	Dundee	50	(4)
Total		271	(15)

International career
2012	Northern Ireland	1	(0)

Managerial career
- 2019–2022: Dundee
- 2022–2024: Dunfermline Athletic
- * Club domestic league appearances and goals

James McPake (born 24 June 1984) is a professional football coach and former player, who was most recently the manager of Dunfermline Athletic. McPake played for Livingston, Greenock Morton, Coventry City, Hibernian and Dundee. He mainly played as a defender, although he started his career as a forward. McPake played once for Northern Ireland, in 2012.

McPake retired from playing football in January 2018, and then started his coaching career in the Dundee youth system. He was appointed as the senior team manager in May 2019, and held this position until February 2022. He was appointed Dunfermline Athletic manager in May 2022 and was dismissed in December 2024, having won the Scottish League One title in 2023.

== Playing career ==
=== Livingston ===
During his youth career, Bellshill-born McPake played for Holytown Colts, Celtic South BC, Coatbridge Amateurs and Livingston pro youth. He began his professional career when he signed for then Scottish First Division team Livingston in August 2000 as a youth academy player. He did not make his debut for the club until almost four years later in April 2004, when Livingston were playing in the SPL. He agreed a new two-year contract with Livingston in 2005.

In January 2006, Scottish Second Division side Greenock Morton signed McPake on loan, after he had rejected proposed loan moves to Gretna and Partick Thistle. He made his debut for Morton against Gretna on 14 January and went on to make ten appearances for the club, scoring two goals in the process. His two goals were both scored in the same game, against Alloa Athletic.

In October 2006, the Scottish media reported that McPake would be moving to English Football League Championship club Plymouth Argyle. It was confirmed that he was due to go to Plymouth for a week-long trial, but Livingston later changed their minds and the trial never materialised. In July 2007, two months after the appointment of manager Mark Proctor, McPake was appointed club captain. Scottish Premier League outfit St Mirren had a bid for him rejected by Livingston.

=== Coventry City ===
McPake signed a pre-contract in December 2008 to join Coventry City on a three-and-a-half-year deal in the summer of 2009, but Coventry and Livingston agreed a fee on 2 February 2009 to complete the transfer immediately. He scored his first goal for the club against Leicester City on 21 March 2010. He suffered a back injury that required surgery in May 2011. He signed a one-year contract extension with Coventry City in August 2011 extending his contract to July 2013.

=== Hibernian ===
McPake signed for Hibernian on an initial six-month loan deal from Coventry City on 23 January 2012. He made his debut for the club the following Saturday, and was sent off in a 4–0 defeat to Rangers. He was made team captain on his first appearance. He led the team to safety from relegation, and former Hibs defender Craig Paterson expressed his hope that McPake would sign a longer deal with Hibs. McPake scored Hibs' only goal in the 2012 Scottish Cup Final, a 5–1 defeat to Hearts.

McPake was selected in May 2012 by Northern Ireland, qualifying to play for them through a grandparent born in Coleraine. He made his international debut in a 6–0 defeat by Netherlands on 2 June 2012.

McPake signed a two-year contract with Hibs on 30 June 2012. On 3 January 2013, he suffered a bad tackle by Ryan Stevenson in an Edinburgh derby game. Stevenson was suspended for two matches. McPake had injury problems during 2013 that caused him to miss the 2013 Scottish Cup Final, which Pat Fenlon described as a "big blow". After missing out on the Scottish Cup Final, McPake also denied rumours that he had an operation on his back, also played down talk that he would be forced into retirement because of his back injury and criticised internet trolls over this taunt. McPake's first team opportunities were limited during the 2013–14 season and after Hibs were relegated to the Scottish Championship, he was released by the club in May 2014. He said that he had been fit for ten weeks and was disappointed he didn't have the chance to help Hibs avoid relegation.

=== Dundee ===
After being released by Hibernian, McPake was linked with newly promoted Scottish Premiership club Dundee, but this was denied by their manager Paul Hartley. However, McPake signed for the club in May 2014. On 30 January 2015, he signed a contract extension, keeping him at the club until the summer of 2017.

On 2 January 2016, whilst playing in a Dundee derby, McPake suffered a serious knee injury which would end his season. McPake was appointed club captain for the 2016–17 season, but suffered another setback on his injury, keeping him out until January 2017.

== Coaching career ==
=== Dundee ===
McPake announced his retirement from playing in January 2018, and took up a coaching position in the Dundee academy system. After Dundee sacked manager Jim McIntyre in May 2019, McPake was appointed caretaker manager for the final game of the season against St Mirren. A few weeks later, he was appointed Dundee manager on a permanent basis.

At the end of the 2020–21 season, McPake led his team into winning the Premiership play-offs and gaining promotion to the Scottish Premiership. At the end of the season, he was awarded the SPFL Scottish Championship Manager of the Year.

McPake was sacked by Dundee on 16 February 2022, with Dundee sitting in 11th place in the Premiership.

=== Dunfermline Athletic ===
Scottish League One club Dunfermline Athletic appointed McPake as their manager on 24 May 2022. A successful first season with the Pars culminated with McPake leading the side to the Scottish League One title and promotion to the Scottish Championship

On Dunfermline's return to the Championship McPake guided the club to a 6th place finish and the following season was dismissed on 23 December 2024 after the poor run of form carried over from the previous season.

== Career statistics ==
Appearances and goals by club, season and competition
Club	Season	League			National cup		League cup		Other (Note: Soccerbase did not record a Challenge Cup appearance in 2008–09 on 26 July 2008. His appearances in that competition for that season is 2, not 1 as stated.)		Total	
Club	Season	Division	Apps	Goals	Apps	Goals	Apps	Goals	Apps	Goals	Apps	Goals
Livingston	2003–04	Scottish Premier League	1	0	0	0	0	0	—		1	0
Livingston	2004–05	Scottish Premier League	14	1	3	0	0	0	—		17	1
Livingston	2005–06	Scottish Premier League	15	0	0	0	1	0	—		16	0
Livingston	2006–07	Scottish First Division	33	3	2	0	2	0	0	0	38	3
Livingston	2007–08	Scottish First Division	19	0	3	0	2	0	1 (Note: Appearances in the Scottish Challenge Cup)	0	25	0
Livingston	2008–09	Scottish First Division	18	2	1	0	2	0	2	0	23	2
Livingston	Total		100	6	9	0	7	0	3	0	119	6
Greenock Morton (loan)	2005–06	Scottish Second Division	10	2	0	0	0	0	0	0	10	2
Coventry City	2008–09	Championship	4	0	1	0	0	0	—		5	0
Coventry City	2009–10	Championship	17	1	2	0	0	0	—		19	1
Coventry City	2010–11	Championship	12	0	0	0	1	0	—		13	0
Coventry City	2011–12	Championship	5	0	0	0	1	0	—		6	0
Coventry City	Total		38	1	3	0	2	0	0	0	43	1
Hibernian (loan)	2011–12	Scottish Premier League	11	0	4	1	0	0	—		15	1
Hibernian	2012–13	Scottish Premier League	29	2	3	0	0	0	—		32	2
Hibernian	2013–14	Scottish Premiership	3	0	0	0	1	0	2 (Note: Appearances in the Europa League)	0	6	0
Hibernian	Total		43	2	7	1	1	0	2	0	53	3
Dundee	2014–15	Scottish Premiership	34	2	2	0	2	0	—		38	2
Dundee	2015–16	Scottish Premiership	16	2	0	0	1	0	—		17	2
Dundee	2016–17	Scottish Premiership	0	0	0	0	0	0	—		0	0
Dundee	2017–18	Scottish Premiership	0	0	0	0	0	0	—		0	0
Dundee	Total		50	4	2	0	3	0	0	0	55	4
Career total			241	15	21	1	13	0	5	0	280	16

=== Managerial record ===
As of match played 21 December 2024

Managerial record by team and tenure
Team	Nat	From	To	Record								Ref
Team	Nat	From	To	G	W	D	L	GF	GA	GD	Win %	Ref
Dundee	(Scotland)	13 May 2019	16 February 2022	106	44	25	37	152	141	+11	41.51	—
Dunfermline Athletic	(Scotland)	24 May 2022	23 December 2024	113	50	30	33	160	114	+46	44.25	—
Total				219	94	55	70	312	255	+57	42.92	—

- Initially caretaker at Dundee and appointed permanently on 31 May 2019.

== Honours ==
=== Dundee ===
- Scottish Premiership play-offs: 2020–21

=== Dunfermline Athletic ===
- Scottish League One: 2022–23

=== Individual ===
- Scottish Championship Manager of the Year: 2020–21
- Scottish Championship manager of the month: October 2019, March 2021
- Scottish League 1 manager of the month: September/October 2022, November 2022
