= 2006–07 Livingston F.C. season =

Livingston F.C.
2006–07 season
- Manager: John Robertson
- Stadium: Almondvale Stadium
- Scottish First Division: 6th
- Scottish Cup: Fourth round
- League Cup: Third round
- Challenge Cup: First round
- Top goalscorer: Craig (7)

Season 2006–07 saw Livingston compete in the First Division. They also competed in the Challenge Cup, League Cup, and the Scottish Cup.

== Summary ==
Livingston finished 6th in their first season back in the Scottish First Division having been relegated from the Scottish Premier League.

== Results & fixtures ==
Win Draw Loss

=== First Division ===
5 August 2006	Livingston	2–0	Queen of the South	Almondvale Stadium
15:00	Mackay 73'; Shields 76'	Livi Mad Report		Attendance: 2,228; Referee: Conroy

2 August 2008	Ross County	0–3	Livingston	Victoria Park
15:00		Livi Mad Report	Mackay 30'; Adams 44' (o.g.); Craig 54'	Attendance: 2,321; Referee: S MacDonald

19 August 2006	Livingston	2–2	Partick Thistle	Almondvale Stadium
15:00	Mitchell 78'; Mackay 87'	Livi Mad Report	Campbell 7'; Roberts 80'	Attendance: 1,800; Referee: Brines

26 August 2006	Dundee	0–1	Livingston	Dens Park
15:00		Livi Mad Report	Mackay 79'	Attendance: 4,059; Referee: Clark

9 September 2006	Livingston	3–0	Airdrie United	Almondvale Stadium
15:00	Craig 26'; McPake 45'; Mitchell 65'	Livi Mad Report		Attendance: 2,054; Referee: Freeland

16 September 2006	Gretna	1–1	Livingston	Raydale Park
15:00	Townsley 32'	Livi Mad Report	Craig 5'	Attendance: 2,023; Referee: Somers

23 September 2006	Livingston	1–1	St Johnstone	Almondvale Stadium
15:00	Craig 16'	Livi Mad Report	Scotland 29'	Attendance: 2,669; Referee: Ritchie

30 September 2006	Clyde	1–1	Livingston	Broadwood Stadium
15:00	Ferguson 47'	Livi Mad Report	Shields 85'	Attendance: 1,429; Referee: Sproule

13 October 2006	Livingston	0–1	Hamilton Academical	Almondvale Stadium
19:45		Livi Mad Report	Gilhaney 44'	Attendance: 2,177; Referee: Boyle

21 October 2006	Livingston	0–0	Ross County	Almondvale Stadium
15:00		Livi Mad Report		Attendance: 2,060; Referee: Collum

28 October 2006	Queen of the South	2–0	Livingston	Palmerston Park
15:00	Thomson 67', 86'	Livi Mad Report		Attendance: 1,752; Referee: Conroy

4 November 2006	Airdrie United	0–1	Livingston	New Broomfield
15:00		Livi Mad Report	Tweed 90'	Attendance: 1,455; Referee: Finnie

11 November 2006	Livingston	2–3	Dundee	Almondvale Stadium
15:00	Harris 47' (o.g.); Fox 90'	BBC Report	Swankie 15', 77'; Lyle 63'	Attendance: 1,868; Referee: McDonald

18 November 2006	Livingston	1–2	Gretna	Almondvale Stadium
15:00	Stewart (red card) 32'; Dorrans 46'	BBC Report	McMenamin 21'; Grainger 34'	Attendance: 2,176; Referee: Tumilty

25 November 2006	St Johnstone	1–2	Livingston	McDiarmid Park
15:00	Hardie 74'	BBC Report	Fox 69'; Mitchell 85'	Attendance: 2,756; Referee: Dougal

2 December 2006	Hamilton Academical	1–1	Livingston	New Douglas Park
15:00	Wake 21'	BBC Report	McPake 64'	Attendance: 1,515; Referee: Thomson

9 December 2006	Livingston	1–1	Clyde	Almondvale Stadium
15:00	Teggert 34'; Craig (yellow card) 47' (red card)	BBC Report	Arbuckle 82'	Attendance: 2,104; Referee: Richmond

16 December 2006	Partick Thistle	2–3	Livingston	Firhill Stadium
15:00	Brady; McConalogue	BBC Report	Teggert 10'; Walker 71'; McPake 86'	Attendance: 2,591

23 December 2006	Livingston	0–1	Queen of the South	Almondvale Stadium
15:00		BBC Report	Thomson 84'	Attendance: 1,450; Referee: McCurry

30 December 2006	Livingston	1–3	Airdrie United	Almondvale Stadium
15:00	Cuthbert 33'	BBC Report	Twigg 12', 80'; Holmes 71'	Attendance: 1,945; Referee: MacKay

2 January 2007	Dundee	2–0	Livingston	Dens Park
15:00	Mackay 46' (o.g.); Robertson 82'	BBC Report		Attendance: 3,804; Referee: Ritchie

13 January 2007	Livingston	3–2	St Johnstone	Almondvale Stadium
15:00	Mackay 12'; Craig 51'; Teggart 80'	Liv Mad Report	Lawrie 23'; McLaren 88'	Attendance: 1,549; Referee: Underhill

20 January 2007	Gretna	4–1	Livingston	Raydale Park
15:00	Canning 11'; Innes 39'; McMenamin 75', 81'	Livi Mad Report	Mitchell 56'	Attendance: 1,310; Referee: Allan

27 January 2007	Livingston	1–2	Hamilton Academical	Almondvale Stadium
15:00	Teggart 26'; Innes (yellow card) 71' (red card)	Livi Mad Report	Winters 88'; Elebert 90'	Attendance: 1,085; Referee: Smith

10 February 2007	Clyde	0–1	Livingston	Broadwood Stadium
15:00		Livi Mad Report	Golabek 44'	Attendance: 1,007; Referee: Hardie

17 February 2007	Livingston	0–1	Partick Thistle	Almondvale Stadium
15:00		BBC Report	Russell 21'	Attendance: 2,221; Referee: McDonald

24 February 2007	Ross County	0–2	Livingston	Victoria Park
15:00		Livi Mad Report	Dorrans 77'; Fox 82'	Attendance: 2,324; Referee: Brines

3 March 2007	Livingston	1–3	Dundee	Almondvale Stadium
15:00	Dorrans 33'	BBC Report	Davidson 65' (pen.), 80'; McDonald 89'	Attendance: 1,980; Referee: Tumilty

10 March 2007	Airdrie United	3–1	Livingston	New Broomfield
15:00	Holmes 49'; Taylor 77'; Proctor 90'	BBC Report	Mackay 34' (pen.); Tweed (red card) 38'; Mole (red card) 41'	Attendance: 1,162; Referee: Boyle

17 March 2007	Livingston	1–1	Gretna	Almondvale Stadium
15:00	Craig 28'	BBC Report	Graham 60'	Attendance: 1,748; Referee: Sproule

31 March 2007	St Johnstone	1–2	Livingston	McDiarmid Park
15:00	Scotland 30'; Cuthbert (red card) 73'	BBC Report	Dorrans 69', 81'	Attendance: 2,436; Referee: Smith

4 April 2007	Livingston	0–0	Clyde	Almondvale Stadium
19:45		BBC Report		Attendance: 1,646; Referee: Allan

7 April 2007	Hamilton Academical	3–0	Livingston	New Douglas Park
15:00	Elebert 13'; Offiong 28'; Winters 52'	BBC Report	Makel (yellow card) 87' (red card)	Attendance: 1,283; Referee: Brown

14 April 2007	Queen of the South	1–1	Livingston	Palmerston Park
15:00	O'Connor 45'	BBC Report	Craig 52'	Attendance: 1,983; Referee: Underhill

21 April 2007	Livingston	1–1	Ross County	Almondvale Stadium
15:00	Griffiths 28'	Livi Mad Report	Gardyne 47'	Attendance: 1,743; Referee: Muir

28 April 2007	Partick Thistle	0–0	Livingston	Firhill Stadium
15:00		BBC Report		Attendance: 2,915; Referee: Ritchie

=== Challenge Cup ===
15 August 2006 First round	Ayr United	2–1	Livingston	Somerset Park
19:30	Hislop 28' (o.g.); Vareille 75'	BBC Report	Craig 17'	Attendance: 949; Referee: McCurry

=== League Cup ===
22 August 2006 Second round	Brechin City	0–3	Livingston	Glebe Park
19:45		BBC Report	Craig 37'; Dorrans 40'; Hislop 87'	Attendance: 466; Referee: McDonald

19 September 2006 Third round	Kilmarnock	2–1 (a.e.t.)	Livingston	Rugby Park
19:45	Wales 57'; Wright 115'	BBC Report	Craig 72' (pen.)	Attendance: 3,573; Referee: Smith

=== Scottish Cup ===
6 January 2007 Third round	Hamilton	2–4	Livingston	New Douglas Park
15:00	McArthur 54'; McCarthy 86'	BBC Report	Dorrans 30', 81'; Tweed 65'; Hamill 73'	Attendance: 1,228; Referee: McDonald

4 February 2007 Fourth round	Livingston	1–4	Celtic	Almondvale Stadium
15:00	Mackay 18'	BBC Report	O'Dea 30'; Riordan 45', 59'; Vennegoor of Hesselink 61'	Attendance: 7,281; Referee: Richmond

== Statistics ==
=== League table ===
Pos	Team	Pld	W	D	L	GF	GA	GD	Pts
4	Hamilton Academical	36	14	11	11	46	47	−1	53
5	Clyde	36	11	14	11	46	35	+11	47
6	Livingston	36	11	12	13	41	46	−5	45
7	Partick Thistle	36	12	9	15	47	63	−16	45
8	Queen of the South	36	10	11	15	34	54	−20	41

Source: "2006-2007 First Division - SPFL Archive". SPFL.
Rules for classification: 1) points; 2) goal difference; 3) number of goals scored.
