= Richard Wood (footballer) =

English footballer (born 1985)

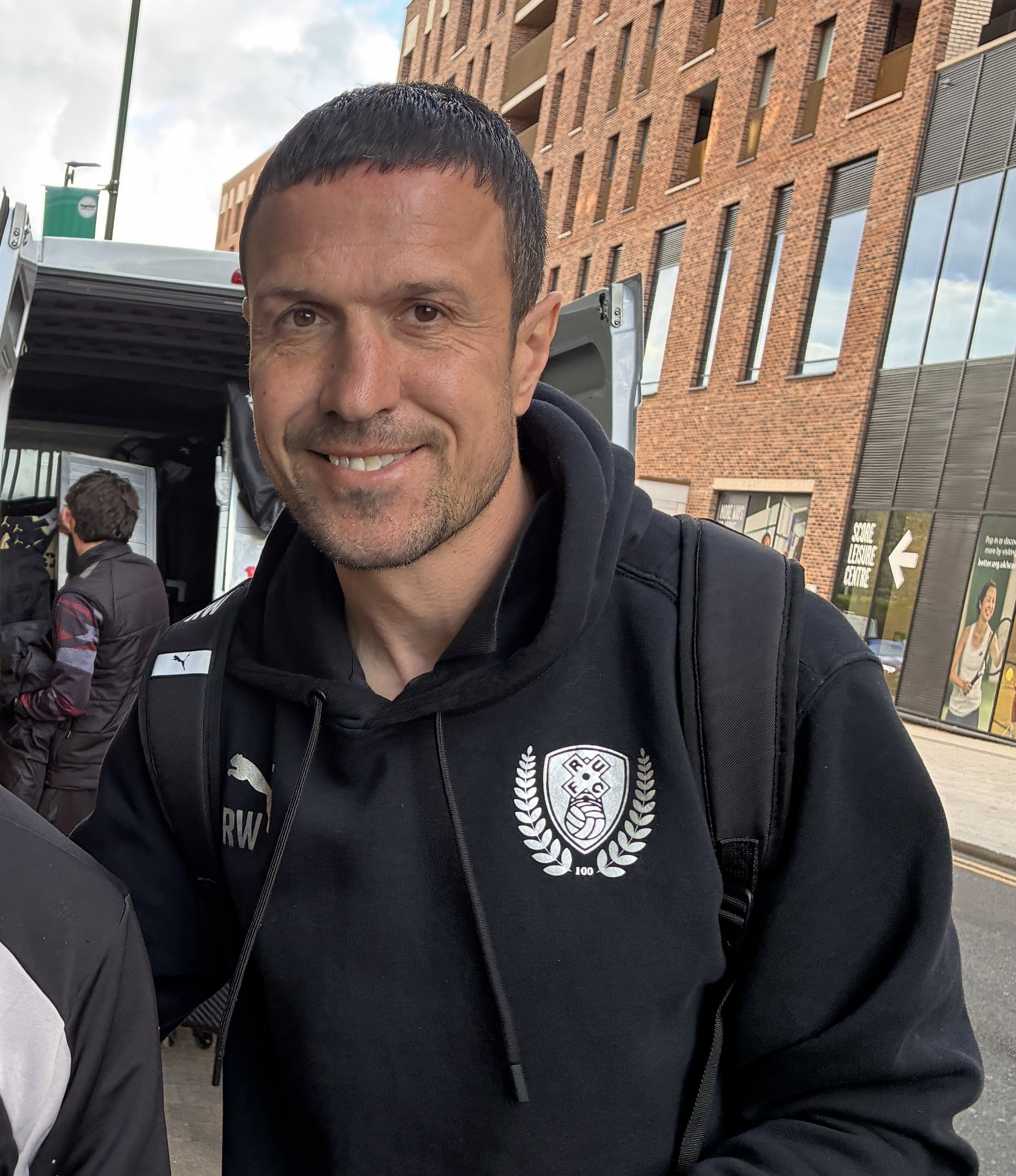
- Wood in 2026

Personal information
- Full name: Richard Mark Wood
- Date of birth: 5 July 1985 (age 41)
- Place of birth: Ossett, England
- Height: 6 ft 3 in (1.91 m)
- Position: Defender

Team information
- Current team: Rotherham United (first-team coach)

Youth career
- ?–2003: Sheffield Wednesday

Senior career*
Years	Team	Apps	(Gls)
2003–2010	Sheffield Wednesday	174	(7)
2009	→ Coventry City (loan)	5	(1)
2010–2013	Coventry City	112	(7)
2013–2014	Charlton Athletic	21	(0)
2014–2023	Rotherham United	230	(18)
2015	→ Crawley Town (loan)	10	(3)
2015	→ Fleetwood Town (loan)	6	(0)
2015	→ Chesterfield (loan)	5	(0)
2023–2025	Doncaster Rovers	35	(0)
Total		593	(36)

Managerial career
- 2022: Rotherham United (co-caretaker)
- * Club domestic league appearances and goals as of 16:00, 8 May 2025 (UTC)

Richard Mark Wood (born 5 July 1985) is an English retired professional footballer who played as a defender. He is currently a first-team coach at Rotherham United.

== Club career ==
=== Sheffield Wednesday ===
Born in Ossett, West Yorkshire, Wood was a Leeds United fan and had a season ticket at Leeds, however Wood came up through the ranks at Sheffield Wednesday and started to support The Owls instead. He broke into the senior side at the end of the 2002–03 season and capped his superb performance with a goal on his full debut against Burnley. The young Wood made such an impression that he was handed a two-year deal before he completed the second year of his Academy scholarship.

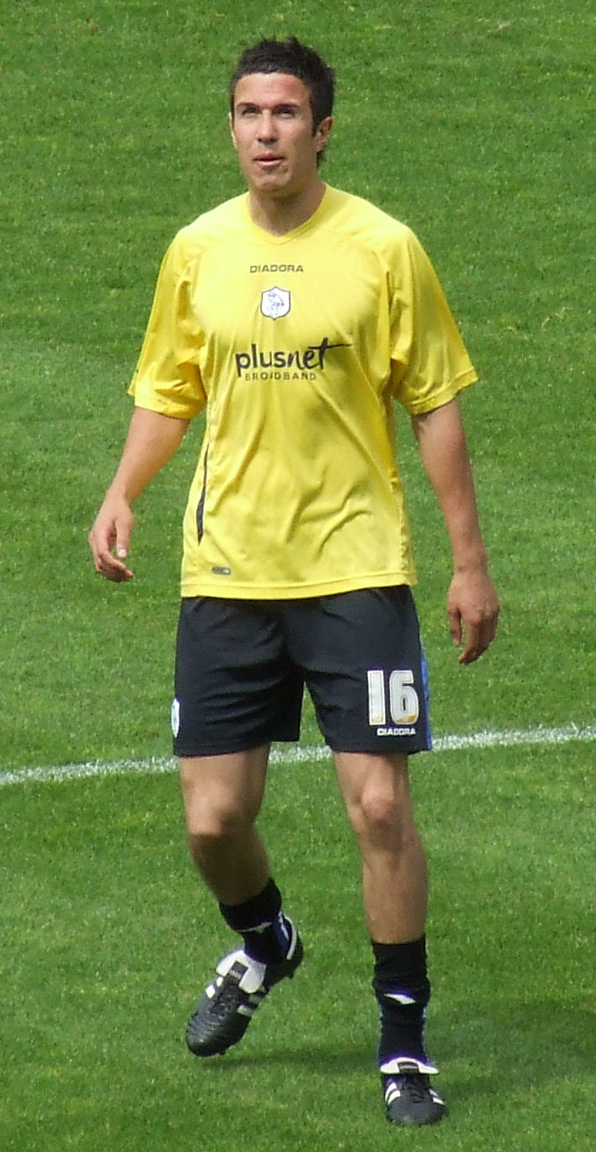
Wood warming up for Sheffield Wednesday in 2007

He formed a partnership with Graham Coughlan in the centre of defence and has put in a series of strong displays.

Wood staked his claim for a regular spot as he missed just one of the final 28 games as Wednesday clinched promotion to the Championship the previous season.

He enjoyed a lengthy run in the 2005–06 season before an untimely injury cut short his season, which also deprived him of making an appearance for the Football League Select XI against an Italian Serie B representative side. He was rewarded by receiving the Rhodes Fairbanks Young player of the year award by fans of the club.

On 3 March 2007, Wood returned from his injury to make his first start for Wednesday in 11 months in a 3–2 league win against Yorkshire rivals Leeds United at Elland Road. He would go on to start in the rest of Wednesday's 11 games that season and helped them to finish the season with just one loss from 13 games – a run which almost saw the side finish in the Championship play-offs.

Prior to the 2008–09 season Wood was named joint captain alongside Steve Watson, although shortly after the season began Wood handed in a transfer request. The request was declined.

In the 2009–10 campaign, after a successful start for Wood, scoring two goals in two matches, he declined a new contract with Wednesday, and he was transfer listed on 29 October 2009.

=== Coventry City ===
On 18 November 2009, Wood signed for Coventry City on loan until January 2010, when he was then expected to sign a permanent deal. He made his debut in a 1–1 draw with Crystal Palace on 21 November 2009. He then got his first goal for the Sky Blues the following game with the equaliser against Derby County. On 6 December Wood even captained Coventry in a 1–0 loss to Scunthorpe United. After four starts and one substitute appearance, Wood made the move permanent signing on a contract till 2013 on 1 January 2010. On 27 March 2010, Wood scored the equaliser for Coventry in a match against his former club, Sheffield Wednesday. He was also named as captain in this game which finished 1–1.

=== Charlton Athletic ===
On 18 July 2013, Wood signed a one-year deal with Charlton Athletic.

=== Rotherham United ===
On 26 June 2014, Wood signed with Rotherham United. On 20 February 2015, Wood signed a one-month loan deal with Crawley Town. This loan was later extended to the end of the season.

On 23 September 2015, Wood signed a one-month loan deal with Fleetwood Town.

On 26 October 2015, he signed for Chesterfield on a three-month loan deal.

Wood scored his first goal after his return to Rotherham in a 3–1 defeat to Preston North End on 5 November 2016.

Following the departure of Paul Warne as Rotherham United's manager in September 2022, Wood was installed as caretaker manager along with Lee Peltier as the club searched for a permanent option. The duo of Wood and Peltier oversaw one game as co-caretakers, a 2–0 home loss to Wigan Athletic, before the appointment of Matt Taylor from Exeter City.

After the final game of the 2022–23 season, manager Matt Taylor confirmed in a post-match interview that Wood would not be offered a new contract with the club and would be released.

=== Doncaster Rovers ===
On 23 May 2023, Wood signed a one-year contract with Doncaster Rovers. He was recruited by manager Grant McCann for his experience and leadership qualities, joining the club ahead of the 2023–24 EFL League Two season.

On 3 May 2025, Doncaster secured the League Two title on the final day of the season, earning automatic promotion to EFL League One. The championship success marked the first time in Wood’s professional career that he finished top of a league table, resulting in his first winners’ medal, despite having previously achieved multiple promotions at other clubs.

On 7 May 2025, Wood announced his retirement from football due to a persistent ankle injury.

== International career ==
While playing for Sheffield Wednesday, Wood received a call up from the England national under-21 football team however injury prevented him from meeting up with the squad.

== Coaching career ==
On 20 May 2025, Wood returned to Rotherham United as first-team coach.

== Personal life ==
His younger brother, Nick Wood, played in the Sheffield Wednesday academy until the end of the 2009–10 season. He subsequently played a few games for Tranmere Rovers and Mansfield Town.

He studied for a degree in Professional Sports Writing and Broadcasting at Staffordshire University.

== Career statistics ==
As of match played 8 May 2025

Appearances and goals by club, season and competition
Club	Season	League			FA Cup		League Cup		Other		Total	
Club	Season	Division	Apps	Goals	Apps	Goals	Apps	Goals	Apps	Goals	Apps	Goals
Sheffield Wednesday	2002–03	Division One	3	1	0	0	0	0	0	0	3	1
Sheffield Wednesday	2003–04	Division Two	12	0	1	0	1	1	3 (Note: Appearances in the Football League Trophy)	0	17	1
Sheffield Wednesday	2004–05	League One	37	1	1	0	0	0	0	0	38	1
Sheffield Wednesday	2005–06	Championship	30	1	1	0	2	0	0	0	33	1
Sheffield Wednesday	2006–07	Championship	12	0	1	0	0	0	0	0	13	0
Sheffield Wednesday	2007–08	Championship	27	2	0	0	3	0	0	0	30	2
Sheffield Wednesday	2008–09	Championship	42	0	1	0	1	0	0	0	44	0
Sheffield Wednesday	2009–10	Championship	11	2	0	0	0	0	0	0	11	2
Sheffield Wednesday	Total		174	7	5	0	7	1	3	0	189	8
Coventry City (loan)	2009–10	Championship	5	1	0	0	0	0	0	0	5	1
Coventry City	2009–10	Championship	19	2	2	0	0	0	0	0	21	2
Coventry City	2010–11	Championship	40	1	2	1	1	0	0	0	43	2
Coventry City	2011–12	Championship	17	1	1	0	1	0	0	0	19	1
Coventry City	2012–13	League One	36	3	2	0	2	0	6	0	46	3
Coventry City	Total		112	7	7	1	4	0	6	0	129	8
Charlton Athletic	2013–14	Championship	21	0	3	0	2	0	0	0	26	0
Rotherham United	2014–15	Championship	6	0	0	0	2	0	0	0	8	0
Rotherham United	2015–16	Championship	13	0	0	0	0	0	0	0	13	0
Rotherham United	2016–17	Championship	29	2	1	0	1	0	0	0	31	2
Rotherham United	2017–18	League One	36	4	1	0	1	0	4 (Note: One appearance in the 2017–18 EFL Trophy; three appearances in 2017–18 EFL League One play-offs)	3	42	7
Rotherham United	2018–19	Championship	26	2	1	0	0	0	0	0	27	2
Rotherham United	2019–20	League One	23	3	2	0	2	1	1 (Note: Appearance(s) in 2019–20 EFL Trophy)	0	28	4
Rotherham United	2020–21	Championship	30	2	1	0	1	0	0	0	32	2
Rotherham United	2021–22	League One	39	1	3	0	0	0	3 (Note: Appearance(s) in 2021–22 EFL Trophy)	0	45	1
Rotherham United	2022–23	Championship	28	4	1	0	1	0	0	0	30	4
Rotherham United	Total		230	18	10	0	8	1	8	3	256	22
Crawley Town (loan)	2014–15	League One	10	3	0	0	0	0	0	0	10	3
Fleetwood Town (loan)	2015–16	League One	6	0	0	0	0	0	1	0	7	0
Chesterfield (loan)	2015–16	League One	5	0	2	0	0	0	0	0	7	0
Doncaster Rovers	2023–24	League Two	27	0	1	0	0	0	3	0	30	0
Doncaster Rovers	2024–25	League Two	8	0	0	0	0	0	0	0	8	0
Doncaster Rovers	Total		33	0	1	0	0	0	3	0	38	0
Career total			593	36	28	1	21	2	21	3	667	42

== Honours ==
Sheffield Wednesday

- Football League One play-offs: 2005

Rotherham United

- EFL League One second-place promotion: 2019–20, 2021–22; play-offs: 2018
- EFL Trophy: 2021–22

Doncaster Rovers

- EFL League Two: 2024–25
