= Michael Quirke =

Footballer (born 1991)

Personal information
- Full name: Michael James Quirke
- Date of birth: 10 September 1991 (age 35)
- Place of birth: Coventry, England
- Height: 1.74 m (5 ft 9 in)
- Positions: Defender; goalkeeper

Team information
- Current team: Coventry United

Youth career
- Coventry City

Senior career*
Years	Team	Apps	(Gls)
2009–2011	Coventry City	4	(0)
2010	→ Nuneaton Town (loan)	0	(0)
2011	→ Nuneaton Town (loan)	1	(0)
2012	Coalville Town		
2012	Leamington		
2012	Bedworth United		
2012	Loughborough Dynamo		
2012–2013	Coalville Town		
2013	Kettering Town		
2013–2014	Coventry Alvis		
2014–2015	Coventry Copsewood		
2015–2017	Coventry Alvis		
2017–2019	Coventry Sphinx		
2019–	Coventry United		

International career^{‡}
2011	Republic of Ireland U21	1	(0)
- * Club domestic league appearances and goals as of 19:00, 25 December 2019 (UTC) ‡ National team caps and goals as of 19:00, 25 December 2019 (UTC)

Michael James Quirke (born 10 September 1991) is a footballer who plays as a defender for Coventry United. A Coventry City youth product, he used to be a goalkeeper. Born in England, he made one appearance for the Republic of Ireland U21 national team in 2011.

== Club career ==
Quirke, made his professional debut with Coventry City as a substitute on 14 August 2010 in a 2–2 Championship draw with Watford, coming on to replace injured Iain Turner after 18 minutes. In March 2010 he joined Nuneaton Town on work experience terms, and made his sole appearance for the club in a Birmingham Senior Cup tie against Leamington. He rejoined Nuneaton on loan in January 2011, making his debut in the Conference North fixture versus Redditch United. On 8 March 2011, he made his first team start for the Sky Blues in a 1–1 draw with Doncaster Rovers.

On 5 May 2011, Quirke was informed that he would not be having his contract renewed and would be free to leave Coventry City once his current deal expired. In November 2012, he re-joined Coalville Town on a free transfer from Lougborough Dynamo.

Quirke joined Coventry United on 31 July 2019, and was installed as the club's captain for the forthcoming campaign.

== International career ==
He was called up to the Republic of Ireland U21 international squad and made his international debut as a substitute in March 2011 in the Estádio Municipal de Águeda in Portugal.
