= Ronald Hikspoors =

Dutch footballer (born 1988)

Personal information
- Date of birth: 27 April 1988 (age 38)
- Place of birth: Geldrop, Netherlands
- Height: 1.87 m (6 ft 2 in)
- Positions: Striker; centre-back

Youth career
- 1999–2007: NWC Asten
- 2008: PSV Eindhoven

Senior career*
Years	Team	Apps	(Gls)
2009	Helmond Sport	1	(0)
2011–2014	FK Varnsdorf	37	(3)
2014	MVV	10	(1)
2014–2016	Sarawak	10	(0)
2016	PSM Makassar	9	(1)
Total		67	(5)

Managerial career
- 2023–: Helmond Sport (asst.)
- * Club domestic league appearances and goals

Ronald Hikspoors (born 27 April 1988) is a Dutch football coach and former player, who is currently assistant coach of Eerste Divisie club Helmond Sport. During his career, he played as a striker and centre-back.

== Career ==
Born in Geldrop. Hikspoors grew up in Asten where he started playing football at the local amateur club.

=== Sarawak ===
A trialist for Malaysian club Sarawak in late 2013, Hikspoors failed to earn a contract with the team but in 2014 the media spread rumors that he was the best choice to replace Muamer Salibašić as forward and the forward finally signed a one-year contract by the end of the year. Usually playing as an attacker, Hikspoors put in a solid display in the back line for his team, forcing opponents JDT to just long shots.

=== PSM Makassar ===
A mid-season foreign import to PSM Makassar in 2016, the Dutchman notched his first goal for the Indonesian outfit in a round 10 clash against Persib Bandung in the 65th minute. In response, the Persib Bandung staff and players lacerated the referee for his decision to let the goal count but the game resumed play shortly after. One game later, however, Hikspoors' time in Indonesia was cut short by colliding with two opposing players and getting pulled out 15 minutes into a match versus Persiba Balikpapan. The injury he suffered forced him to miss the rest of the season and undergo recovery in his native Netherlands.

Throughout his stay in Indonesia, the footballer was suspended once for getting two straight yellow cards.

== Coaching career ==
In 2023, he was appointed assistant coach of Eerste Divisie club Helmond Sport.

== Externall inks ==
- Ronald Hikspoors at Eersterat (in Dutch)
