= 2012–13 Hoofdklasse =

Hoofdklasse
- Season: 2012–13
- Champions: Sat A: Ter Leede; Sat B: Excelsior Maassluis; Sat C: ONS Sneek; Sun A: Leonidas; Sun B: UNA; Sun C: Be Quick 1887
- Promoted: Sat A: Ter Leede; Sat B: Excelsior Maassluis; Sat C: ONS Sneek; Sun A: Leonidas; Sun B: UNA; Sun C: Be Quick 1887, Juliana '31
- Relegated: Sat A: ARC, DTS Ede; Sat B: Nivo Sparta, Nieuw-Lekkerland, Alexandria '66; Sat C: Nunspeet, NSC, HZVV; Sun A: Argon, Elinkwijk, Feyenoord, Alphense Boys; Sun B: Brabantia, Someren; Sun C: Rigtersbleek, Nieuw Buinen

The 2012–13 season of the Hoofdklasse is competed in six leagues, three Saturday leagues and three Sunday leagues. The champions of each group promoted direct to the 2013–14 Topklasse.

== Teams ==
=== Saturday A ===
Location of teams in the Saturday A

Club	Home City	Venue	Capacity
Ajax (amateurs)	Amsterdam	De Toekomst	
CSV Apeldoorn	Apeldoorn	Sportpark Orderbos	2.500
ARC	Alphen aan den Rijn	Zegersloot	9,000
Bennekom	Bennekom	Eikelhof	
DOVO	Veenendaal	Panhuis	
DTS Ede	Ede	Inschoten	
Huizen	Huizen	De Wolfskamer	5,000
Montfoort	Montfoort	Hofland	
ODIN '59	Heemskerk	Assumburg	
Quick Boys	Katwijk aan Zee	Nieuw-Zuid	7,500
Sportlust '46	Woerden	Cromwijck	1,400
Ter Leede	Sassenheim	De Roodemolen	3,000
Volendam	Volendam	Gem. Sportpark	
VVA '71	Achterberg	De Meent	

=== Saturday B ===
Location of teams in the Saturday B

Club	Location	Venue	Capacity
Achilles Veen	Veen	De Heuye	
Alexandria '66	Rotterdam	Oosterflank	
ASWH	Hendrik-Ido-Ambacht	Sportpark Schildman	3,000
Excelsior Maassluis	Maassluis	Lavendelstraat	5,000
Heinenoord	Heinenoord	De Tienvoet	
Hoek	Hoek	Denoek	2,500
Kloetinge	Kloetinge	Wesselopark	1,500
Nieuw-Lekkerland	Nieuw Lekkerland	Excelsior	
Nivo Sparta	Zaltbommel	Eurosportpark	
RVVH	Ridderkerk	Ridderkerk	3,000
Smitshoek	Barendrecht	Smitshoek	1,000
SteDoCo	Hoornaar	Stedoco	
Xerxes	Rotterdam	Sportpark Faas Wilkes	3,500
Zwaluwen	Vlaardingen	Zwaluwen	

=== Saturday C ===
Location of teams in the Saturday C

Club	Location	Venue	Capacity
ACV	Assen	Univé Sportpark	5.000
Berkum	Zwolle	De Vegtlust	3.000
DVS '33	Ermelo	DVS '33	
Flevo Boys	Emmeloord	Sportpark Ervenbos	3.000
Harkemase Boys	Harkema	De Bosk	5.500
HZVV	Hoogeveen	Bentinckspark	
NSC	Nijkerk	De Burcht	
Nunspeet	Nunspeet	De Wiltsangh	6.000
ONS Sneek	Sneek	Zuidersportpark	
Sparta Nijkerk	Nijkerk	Ebbenhorst	
Staphorst	Staphorst	Het Noorderslag	2.500
SVZW	Wierden	Het Lageveld	
VVOG	Harderwijk	De Strokel	
WHC	Wezep	Mulderssingel	

=== Sunday A ===
Location of teams in the Sunday A

Club	Location	Venue	Capacity
Alphense Boys	Alphen aan den Rijn	De Bijlen	
Argon	Mijdrecht	Argon	
De Zouaven	Grootebroek	De Kloet	
DHC	Delft	Brasserskade	
EDO	Haarlem	Noordersportpark	
Elinkwijk	Zuilen, Utrecht	Elinkwijk	
Feyenoord	Rotterdam	Varkenoord	
Hilversum	Hilversum	Crailoo	
Koninklijke HFC	Haarlem	Kon. HFC	
Leonidas	Rotterdam	Leonidas	
Nieuwenhoorn	Nieuwenhoorn, Hellevoetsluis	Nieuwenhoorn	
Quick (H)	The Hague	Nieuw Hanenburg	
RKAVV	Leidschendam	De Kastelenring	
Westlandia	Naaldwijk	Hoge Bomen	

=== Sunday B ===
Location of teams in the Sunday B

Club	Location	Venue	Capacity
Baronie	Breda	Sportpark De Blauwe Kei	7.000
Blauw Geel '38	Veghel	Prins Willem Alexander	
Brabantia	Eindhoven	Gemeentelijk Sportpark	
Dongen	Dongen	De Biezen	
Deurne	Deurne	De Kranenmortel	
EHC	Hoensbroek	De Dem	
GOES	Goes	Het Schenge	
Groene Ster	Heerlen	Pronsebroek	
Nuenen	Nuenen	Oude Landen	
Schijndel	Schijndel	De Rooise Heide	
Someren	Someren	De Potacker	
UDI '19	Uden	Parkzicht	
UNA	Veldhoven	Zeelst	
Venray	Venray	De Wieen	

=== Sunday C ===
Location of teams in the Sunday C

Club	Location	Venue	Capacity
Alcides	Meppel	Ezinge	
Be Quick 1887	Haren, Groningen	Esserberg	
De Bataven	Gendt	Walburgen	
Hoogeveen	Hoogeveen	Bentinckspark	
Juliana '31	Malden	De Broeklanden	
Longa '30	Lichtenvoorde	De Treffer	
MSC	Meppel	Ezinge	
SC NEC	Nijmegen	De Eendracht	
Nieuw Buinen	Nieuw-Buinen	Buunerdrome	
OJC Rosmalen	Rosmalen	De Groote Wielen	
Quick '20	Oldenzaal	Vondersweijde	6,500
Rigtersbleek	Enschede	Bleekrondom	
RKHVV	Huissen	De Blauwenburcht	
Rohda Raalte	Raalte	Tijenraan	

== League tables ==
=== Saturday A ===
Pos	Team	Pld	W	D	L	GF	GA	GD	Pts	Promotion or relegation
1	Ter Leede	26	16	6	4	56	20	+36	54	Promoted to Topklasse
2	DOVO	26	14	4	8	39	29	+10	46	Promotion playoff
3	Ajax (amateurs)	26	11	9	6	53	27	+26	42	
4	ODIN '59	26	12	4	10	43	32	+11	40	Promotion playoff
5	VVA '71	26	12	4	10	42	43	−1	40	
6	Montfoort	26	12	4	10	37	43	−6	40	
7	Huizen	26	10	8	8	57	42	+15	38	
8	Quick Boys	26	9	10	7	54	40	+14	37	
9	Bennekom	26	10	7	9	43	41	+2	37	Promotion playoff
10	Sportlust '46	26	9	7	10	32	44	−12	34	
11	CSV Apeldoorn	26	8	5	13	39	47	−8	29	Relegation playoffs
12	ARC	26	6	8	12	43	65	−22	26	Relegated to the Eerste Klasse
13	Volendam	26	6	8	12	35	58	−23	26	Relegation playoffs
14	DTS Ede	26	3	4	19	27	69	−42	13	Relegated to the Eerste Klasse

In determining which teams relegate directly and which teams are allowed to play the playoffs to avoid relegation, only the achieved number of points is considered. The goal difference is completely ignored.
Therefore, ARC and Volendam were considered to have ended equal and had to play an additional match against each other on neutral ground to decide which team was allowed to enter the playoffs.

Team 1	Score	Team 2
Volendam	4 – 2	ARC

=== Saturday B ===
Pos	Team	Pld	W	D	L	GF	GA	GD	Pts	Promotion or relegation
1	Excelsior Maassluis	26	19	2	5	60	30	+30	59	Promoted to Topklasse
2	ASWH	26	17	4	5	64	35	+29	55	Promotion playoff
3	Hoek	26	16	3	7	55	32	+23	51	Promotion playoff
4	RVVH	26	15	4	7	48	29	+19	49	
5	Xerxes	26	13	6	7	58	37	+21	45	Promotion playoff
6	Smitshoek	26	11	6	9	47	42	+5	39	
7	Kloetinge	26	9	8	9	47	48	−1	35	
8	Heinenoord	26	9	7	10	42	48	−6	34	
9	Zwaluwen	26	8	8	10	45	45	0	32	
10	SteDoCo	26	10	2	14	51	55	−4	32	
11	Achilles Veen	26	10	2	14	33	50	−17	32	Relegation playoffs
12	Alexandria '66	26	6	5	15	34	47	−13	23	Relegation playoffs
13	Nivo Sparta	26	4	3	19	28	75	−47	15	Relegated to the Eerste Klasse
14	Nieuw-Lekkerland	26	2	6	18	29	68	−39	12	Relegated to the Eerste Klasse

=== Saturday C ===
Pos	Team	Pld	W	D	L	GF	GA	GD	Pts	Promotion or relegation
1	ONS Sneek	26	15	6	5	57	31	+26	51	Promoted to Topklasse
2	Staphorst	26	12	10	4	48	26	+22	46	Promotion playoff
3	SVZW	26	11	10	5	67	33	+34	43	Promotion playoff
4	ACV	26	11	9	6	41	27	+14	42	Promotion playoff
5	Berkum	26	11	7	8	52	41	+11	40	
6	Sparta Nijkerk	26	11	6	9	54	44	+10	39	
7	DVS '33	26	10	6	10	47	48	−1	36	
8	VVOG	26	9	8	9	47	43	+4	35	
9	Harkemase Boys	26	9	6	11	41	44	−3	33	
10	WHC	26	8	7	11	42	40	+2	31	
11	HZVV	26	9	4	13	36	62	−26	31	Relegation playoffs
12	Flevo Boys	26	7	5	14	38	63	−25	26	Relegation playoffs
13	Nunspeet	26	6	6	14	28	54	−26	24	Relegated to the Eerste Klasse
14	NSC	26	5	6	15	32	74	−42	21	Relegated to the Eerste Klasse

=== Sunday A ===
Pos	Team	Pld	W	D	L	GF	GA	GD	Pts	Promotion or relegation
1	Leonidas	26	14	8	4	43	25	+18	50	Promoted to Topklasse
2	Alphense Boys	26	13	7	6	56	40	+16	46	Promotion playoff
3	De Zouaven	26	13	5	8	42	29	+13	44	
4	Westlandia	26	12	3	11	44	38	+6	39	Promotion playoff
5	DHC	26	12	3	11	42	46	−4	39	
6	Nieuwenhoorn	26	10	8	8	48	39	+9	38	
7	Koninklijke HFC	26	10	6	10	43	33	+10	36	Promotion playoff
8	EDO	26	10	6	10	47	39	+8	36	
9	Hilversum	26	9	6	11	41	56	−15	33	
10	RKAVV	26	10	3	13	34	49	−15	33	
11	Feyenoord	26	7	10	9	42	40	+2	31	Relegation playoffs
12	Quick (H)	26	8	6	12	35	45	−10	30	Relegation playoffs
13	Argon	26	7	5	14	34	46	−12	26	Relegated to the Eerste Klasse
14	Elinkwijk	26	7	4	15	33	59	−26	25	Relegated to the Eerste Klasse

=== Sunday B ===
Pos	Team	Pld	W	D	L	GF	GA	GD	Pts	Promotion or relegation
1	UNA	26	19	4	3	70	33	+37	61	Promoted to Topklasse
2	Schijndel	26	14	4	8	57	41	+16	46	Promotion playoff
3	Venray	26	14	3	9	52	39	+13	45	Promotion playoff
4	EHC	26	13	2	11	43	57	−14	41	Promotion playoff
5	Blauw Geel '38	26	11	6	9	67	59	+8	39	
6	Baronie	26	12	3	11	44	44	0	39	
7	UDI '19	26	11	5	10	46	42	+4	38	
8	Groene Ster	26	10	7	9	43	37	+6	37	
9	Dongen	26	11	4	11	48	46	+2	37	
10	Nuenen	26	11	3	12	48	48	0	36	
11	Deurne	26	8	9	9	46	44	+2	33	Relegation playoffs
12	GOES	26	8	6	12	42	48	−6	30	Relegation playoffs
13	Brabantia	26	7	2	17	34	60	−26	23	Relegated to the Eerste Klasse
14	Someren	26	2	4	20	13	55	−42	10	Relegated to the Eerste Klasse

=== Sunday C ===
Pos	Team	Pld	W	D	L	GF	GA	GD	Pts	Promotion or relegation
1	Be Quick 1887	26	17	3	6	53	27	+26	54	Promoted to Topklasse
2	MSC	26	14	9	3	62	33	+29	51	Promotion playoff
3	Rohda Raalte	26	15	5	6	44	27	+17	50	
4	Alcides	26	13	5	8	54	34	+20	44	Promotion playoff
5	De Bataven	26	14	2	10	49	40	+9	44	
6	Juliana '31	26	12	5	9	41	36	+5	41	Promotion playoff
7	OJC Rosmalen	26	11	7	8	47	36	+11	40	
8	Quick '20	26	10	7	9	48	37	+11	37	
9	SC NEC	26	10	6	10	38	45	−7	36	
10	RKHVV	26	10	3	13	49	57	−8	33	
11	Longa '30	26	5	9	12	34	52	−18	24	Relegation playoffs
12	Hoogeveen	26	6	6	14	39	63	−24	24	Relegation playoffs
13	Rigtersbleek	26	6	5	15	42	68	−26	23	Relegated to the Eerste Klasse
14	Nieuw Buinen	26	1	4	21	28	73	−45	7	Relegated to the Eerste Klasse

== Promotion/relegation play-off Topklasse – Hoofdklasse ==
=== First round ===
The 3 period winners of each league are grouped together and play a semi-competition to decide which of the three continues to the second round. Each team plays one match at home and one match away.

==== Saturday A ====
Pos	Team	Pld	W	D	L	GF	GA	GD	Pts
1	Bennekom	2	1	1	0	2	1	+1	4
2	DOVO	2	0	2	0	1	1	0	2
3	ODIN '59	2	0	1	1	2	3	−1	1

==== Saturday B ====
Pos	Team	Pld	W	D	L	GF	GA	GD	Pts
1	ASWH	2	1	1	0	5	4	+1	4
2	Xerxes	2	0	2	0	2	2	0	2
3	Hoek	2	0	1	1	4	5	−1	1

==== Saturday C ====
Pos	Team	Pld	W	D	L	GF	GA	GD	Pts
1	ACV	2	2	0	0	3	1	+2	6
2	SVZW	2	1	0	1	5	4	+1	3
3	Staphorst	2	0	0	2	2	5	−3	0

==== Sunday A ====
Pos	Team	Pld	W	D	L	GF	GA	GD	Pts
1	Alphense Boys	2	2	0	0	6	2	+4	6
2	Koninklijke HFC	2	0	1	1	2	3	−1	1
3	Westlandia	2	0	1	1	2	5	−3	1

==== Sunday B ====
Pos	Team	Pld	W	D	L	GF	GA	GD	Pts
1	EHC	2	2	0	0	7	2	+5	6
2	Schijndel	2	1	0	1	5	6	−1	3
3	Venray	2	0	0	2	4	8	−4	0

==== Sunday C ====
Pos	Team	Pld	W	D	L	GF	GA	GD	Pts
1	Juliana '31	2	2	0	0	5	2	+3	6
2	Alcides	2	1	0	1	5	4	+1	3
3	MSC	2	0	0	2	4	8	−4	0

=== Second and Final round ===
The 3 remaining teams from the Saturday leagues and the team ranked 13th in the 2012–13 Topklasse Saturday league play in a knock-out system for 1 spot in the 2013–14 Topklasse Saturday league.
Likewise, the 3 remaining teams from the Sunday leagues and the team ranked 13th in the 2012–13 Topklasse Sunday league play in a knock-out system for 1 spot in the 2013–14 Topklasse Sunday league.
For details and results see 2012–13 Topklasse promotion/relegation play-offs.

== Promotion/relegation play-off Hoofdklasse – Eerste Klasse ==
=== Saturday ===
The teams ranked 11th and 12th of each of the 3 Saturday leagues (6 teams) and the 3 period winners of each of the 5 Saturday Eerste Klasse leagues (15 teams), making a total of 21 teams are grouped in 7 groups of 3 teams in such a way that the Hoofdklasse teams each end up in a different group. In each group the 3 teams play a semi-competition in such a way that each team plays one match at home and one match away.
The 7 group winners will play next season in the 2013–14 Hoofdklasse and the remaining teams in the 2013–14 Eerste klasse.

==== Group 1 ====
Pos	Team	Pld	W	D	L	GF	GA	GD	Pts
1	CSV Apeldoorn	2	2	0	0	5	1	+4	6
2	VVGZ	2	0	1	1	3	4	−1	1
3	Eemdijk	2	0	1	1	2	5	−3	1

==== Group 2 ====
Pos	Team	Pld	W	D	L	GF	GA	GD	Pts
1	Volendam	2	1	1	0	4	1	+3	4
2	Swift	2	1	0	1	2	3	−1	3
3	Rijnvogels	2	0	1	1	1	3	−2	1

==== Group 3 ====
Pos	Team	Pld	W	D	L	GF	GA	GD	Pts
1	Achilles Veen	2	2	0	0	5	2	+3	6
2	LRC	2	0	1	1	2	3	−1	1
3	Spijkenisse	2	0	1	1	0	2	−2	1

==== Group 4 ====
Pos	Team	Pld	W	D	L	GF	GA	GD	Pts
1	FC 's-Gravenzande	2	2	0	0	5	1	+4	6
2	Alexandria '66	2	1	0	1	1	3	−2	3
3	Alblasserdam	2	0	0	2	1	3	−2	0

==== Group 5 ====
Pos	Team	Pld	W	D	L	GF	GA	GD	Pts
1	SDC Putten	2	2	0	0	5	2	+3	6
2	PKC '83	2	1	0	1	3	4	−1	3
3	Breukelen	2	0	0	2	2	4	−2	0

==== Group 6 ====
Pos	Team	Pld	W	D	L	GF	GA	GD	Pts
1	Go-Ahead Kampen	2	2	0	0	5	0	+5	6
2	Viboa	2	1	0	1	6	4	+2	3
3	HZVV	2	0	0	2	2	9	−7	0

==== Group 7 ====
Pos	Team	Pld	W	D	L	GF	GA	GD	Pts
1	Flevo Boys	2	2	0	0	5	2	+3	6
2	DOS '37	2	0	1	1	3	4	−1	1
3	Olde Veste '54	2	0	1	1	1	3	−2	1

=== Sunday ===
The teams ranked 11th and 12th of each of the 3 Sunday leagues (6 teams) and the 3 period winners of each of the 6 Sunday Eerste Klasse leagues (18 teams), making a total of 24 teams, play in a 2-round 2 leg knockout system in such a way that the Hoofdklasse teams can never meet each other.
The 6 winners of the second round matches will play next season in the 2013–14 Hoofdklasse and the remaining teams in the 2013–14 Eerste klasse.

First round
1	JOS Watergraafsmeer	2	1	3 (4)
4	SC Feyenoord ^{(Penalties)}	1	2	3 (5)
3	Boshuizen	4	3	7
2	Zeeburgia	0	1	1

Final round
SC Feyenoord	2	0	2
Boshuizen	2	1	3

First round
1	Quick (H)	4	2	6
4	Noordwijk	1	1	2
3	USV Hercules	1	4	5
2	De Meern	2	2	4

Final round
Quick (H)	2	1	3
USV Hercules	2	2	4

First round
1	DESK	2	2	4
4	Deurne ^{(a.e.t.)}	1	4	5
3	DOSKO	1	2	3
2	Meerssen	1	0	1

Final round
Deurne	2	0	2
DOSKO	5	1	6

First round
1	GOES	2	4	6
4	Wittenhorst	1	1	2
3	Best Vooruit	6	1	7
2	TOP Oss	1	1	2

Final round
GOES	1	1	2
Best Vooruit	0	1	1

First round
1	Germania	1	2	3
4	Longa '30 ^{(a.e.t.)}	1	3	4
3	Achilles 1894 ^{(Penalties)}	1	0	1 (4)
2	Silvolde	0	1	1 (2)

Final round
Longa '30	5	2	7
Achilles 1894	0	0	0

First round
1	Hoogeveen	3	2	5
4	Erica	0	1	1
3	AFC Arnhem	4	0	4
2	Joure	2	5	7

Final round
Hoogeveen	3	2	5
Joure	1	2	3

Updated to games played on 30 May 2013.

== "Lucky losers" play-off Hoofdklasse – Eerste Klasse Sunday ==
End of season several clubs/teams from the Sunday leagues decided to switch from the Sunday to the Saturday leagues. The most important reason for doing so was the hope the attract a bigger audience on Saturdays. Among these clubs/teams were 3 Sunday Hoofdklasse teams, Argon, Feyenoord and Hilversum. The decision of Hilversum resulted in an extra spot, in the Sunday Hoofdklasse leagues, becoming available.

Therefore, the teams who lost in the second/final round of the regular promotion/relegation play-off Hoofdklasse – Eerste Klasse Sunday were allowed to compete for this extra spot in a 2-round system.

=== First round ===
In the first round the 6 teams were paired up 2 by 2 to decide in a single match which ones were going to proceed to the second/final round. The home advantage was drawn by lot.

Since Feyenoord had already decided to switch to the Saturday leagues, it was decided, after consultation between Feyenoord and the KNVB, to withdraw Feyenoord from the "Lucky losers" play-off. As a result, Quick (H) proceeded to the second/final round without playing.

Team 1	Score	Team 2
Quick (H)	CANC	Feyenoord
Achilles 1894	1 – 4	Joure
Deurne	4 – 0	Best Vooruit

=== Second/Final round ===
A second spot became available when Achilles '29, as champion of the 2012–13 Topklasse Sunday league, decided to promote to the 2013–14 Eerste Divisie. Promotion from the Topklasse to the Eerste Divisie is not mandatory and in general declined by the champions of the Topklasse leagues, as done by Katwijk, the champion of 2012–13 Topklasse Saturday league. See 2012–13 Topklasse Championship play-offs for details.

So, the 3 remaining teams were now competing for 2 open spots in the 2013–14 Hoofdklasse Sunday leagues.

However, with the competition already in progress, a third spot became available. Right after the Topklasse / Hoofdklasse playoff semifinals match between Alphense Boys and Haaglandia, a big fight took place. Both teams received a fine of Euro 200,00. Additionally Alphense Boys, as a disciplinary measure, was relegated to the Eerste Klasse, because the club was held accountable for the behavior of their supporters who were designated as the cause for the fight. Alphense Boys lost the appeal against the punishment and decided not to try for a second appeal.

The 3 teams were supposed to play a semi-competition with each team playing one match at home and one match away. With eventually 3 open spots available, all 3 teams were allowed to play in the 2013–14 Hoofdklasse Sunday leagues. Therefore, the last match between Joure and Deurne was cancelled.

Pos	Team	Pld	W	D	L	GF	GA	GD	Pts
1	Joure	1	1	0	0	1	0	+1	3
2	Quick (H)	2	1	0	1	4	2	+2	3
3	Deurne	1	0	0	1	1	4	−3	0

Updated to games played on 9 June 2013.
