= List of English football transfers summer 2008 =

This is a list of English football transfers for the 2008 summer transfer window. Only moves featuring at least one Premier League or Championship club are listed.

The summer transfer window opened on 1 July 2008, although a few transfers took place prior to that date; although a carry-over from the winter 2007–08 transfer window, the first non-free non-loan move was completed on 5 February 2008. The window normally would have closed at midnight on 31 August 2008. However, as 31 August fell on a Sunday in 2008, the deadline was extended by 24 hours to midnight on 1 September 2008. Players without a club could join one at any time, either during or in between transfer windows. Clubs below Premier League level could also sign players on loan at any time. If need be, clubs could sign a goalkeeper on an emergency loan, if all others were unavailable.

== Transfers ==
Date	Name	Moving from	Moving to	Fee
4 February 2008	Paulo Monteiro	Unattached	Charlton Athletic	Free
4 February 2008	Romone Rose	Queens Park Rangers	AFC Wimbledon	Work experience
5 February 2008	Benjani	Portsmouth	Manchester City	£3.87m
5 February 2008	Jermain Defoe	Tottenham Hotspur	Portsmouth	Undisclosed
7 February 2008	Sam Filler	Bradford City	Middlesbrough	Undisclosed
7 February 2008	Matt Pickens	Unattached	Queens Park Rangers	Free
7 February 2008	Grzegorz Szamotulski	Unattached	Preston North End	Free
8 February 2008	Adam Bolder	Queens Park Rangers	Sheffield Wednesday	Loan
8 February 2008	Liam Bridcutt	Chelsea	Yeovil Town	Loan
8 February 2008	David Cotterill	Wigan Athletic	Sheffield United	Loan
8 February 2008	Bryan Hodge	Blackburn Rovers	Darlington	Loan
8 February 2008	Will Hoskins	Watford	Nottingham Forest	Loan
8 February 2008	Sherjill MacDonald	West Bromwich Albion	Hereford United	Loan
8 February 2008	Anthony Pulis	Stoke City	Bristol Rovers	Loan
8 February 2008	Adam Rooney	Stoke City	Bury	Loan
11 February 2008	Dean Bowditch	Ipswich Town	Brighton and Hove Albion	Loan
11 February 2008	Robert Milsom	Fulham	Brentford	Loan
12 February 2008	Scott Flinders	Crystal Palace	Yeovil Town	Loan
12 February 2008	Miguel Mostto	Barnsley	Coronel Bolognesi	Loan
12 February 2008	Gary Roberts	Ipswich Town	Crewe Alexandra	Loan
13 February 2008	Tom Craddock	Middlesbrough	Hartlepool United	Loan
14 February 2008	Luke Steele	West Bromwich Albion	Barnsley	Loan
14 February 2008	Joe Widdowson	West Ham United	Rotherham United	Loan
15 February 2008	Josh Dutton-Black	Southampton	Crawley Town	Loan
15 February 2008	James Walker	Charlton Athletic	Southend United	Loan
18 February 2008	Kenny Lunt	Sheffield Wednesday	Crewe Alexandra	Loan
19 February 2008	Russell Anderson	Sunderland	Plymouth Argyle	Loan
19 February 2008	Kenny Keys	Stoke City	Leek Town	Work experience
19 February 2008	Dean McCormick	Stoke City	Leek Town	Work experience
19 February 2008	Gary Teale	Derby County	Plymouth Argyle	Loan
19 February 2008	Juan Velasco	Unattached	Norwich City	Free
19 February 2008	Jack Watson	Stoke City	Leek Town	Work experience
21 February 2008	David Dowson	Sunderland	Chesterfield	Loan
21 February 2008	Peter Hartley	Sunderland	Chesterfield	Loan
21 February 2008	Chris McGrail	Preston North End	Vauxhall Motors	Loan
21 February 2008	Ben Sahar	Chelsea	Sheffield Wednesday	Loan
22 February 2008	Andrew Howell	Queens Park Rangers	Wealdstone	Loan
22 February 2008	Shaleum Logan	Manchester City	Stockport County	Loan
22 February 2008	Luke Moore	Aston Villa	West Bromwich Albion	Loan
22 February 2008	Ian Pearce	Fulham	Southampton	Loan
22 February 2008	John Ruddy	Everton	Stockport County	Loan
22 February 2008	Tommy Smith	Ipswich Town	Stevenage Borough	Loan
25 February 2008	Wayne Brown	Fulham	Brentford	Loan
25 February 2008	Paulo Monteiro	Charlton Athletic	Accrington Stanley	Loan
26 February 2008	Mikkel Andersen	Reading	Torquay United	Loan
26 February 2008	Jordan Robertson	Sheffield United	Oldham Athletic	Loan
27 February 2008	Alex Morfaw	Scunthorpe United	Lincoln City	Loan
27 February 2008	Moses Swaibu	Crystal Palace	Weymouth	Loan
28 February 2008	Lee Hendrie	Sheffield United	Leicester City	Loan
28 February 2008	Stephen O'Halloran	Aston Villa	Leeds United	Loan
28 February 2008	Scott Sinclair	Chelsea	Charlton Athletic	Loan
29 February 2008	Neil Clement	West Bromwich Albion	Hull City	Loan
29 February 2008	Stephen Henderson	Bristol City	Weymouth	Loan
29 February 2008	Michael Johnson	Derby County	Notts County	Loan
29 February 2008	Javier Mascherano	Media Sports Investments	Liverpool	Undisclosed
29 February 2008	Izale McLeod	Charlton Athletic	Colchester United	Loan
29 February 2008	Chris Riggott	Middlesbrough	Stoke City	Loan
29 February 2008	Dorian Smith	Tooting & Mitcham United	Charlton Athletic	Undisclosed
3 March 2008	Dave McClements	Sheffield Wednesday	Buxton	Loan
4 March 2008	Craig Beattie	West Bromwich Albion	Preston North End	Loan
4 March 2008	Kelvin Etuhu	Manchester City	Leicester City	Loan
4 March 2008	Carlo Nash	Wigan Athletic	Stoke City	Loan
4 March 2008	Curtis Weston	Leeds United	Scunthorpe United	Loan
5 March 2008	Leroy Lita	Reading	Charlton Athletic	Loan
6 March 2008	Daniel Jones	Wolverhampton Wanderers	Northampton Town	Loan
6 March 2008	Harry Worley	Chelsea	Leicester City	Loan
7 March 2008	Jamie Annerson	Sheffield United	Chesterfield	Loan
7 March 2008	Joe Anyinsah	Preston North End	Crewe Alexandra	Loan
7 March 2008	Alan Bennett	Reading	Brentford	Loan
7 March 2008	David Forde	Cardiff City	AFC Bournemouth	Loan
7 March 2008	Russell Hoult	Stoke City	Notts County	Loan
7 March 2008	Brett Ormerod	Preston North End	Nottingham Forest	Loan
7 March 2008	Franck Songo'o	Portsmouth	Sheffield Wednesday	Loan
11 March 2008	Jean-François Christophe	Portsmouth	Yeovil Town	Loan
12 March 2008	Andreas Granqvist	Wigan Athletic	Helsingborg	Loan
13 March 2008	Kasper Schmeichel	Manchester City	Coventry City	Loan
14 March 2008	Jay Bothroyd	Wolverhampton Wanderers	Stoke City	Loan
14 March 2008	Matt Heath	Leeds United	Colchester United	Loan
14 March 2008	Shefki Kuqi	Crystal Palace	Ipswich Town	Loan
14 March 2008	Jordan Parkes	Watford	Barnet	Loan
18 March 2008	Johann Vogel	Unattached	Blackburn Rovers	Free
19 March 2008	Maceo Rigters	Blackburn Rovers	Norwich City	Loan
20 March 2008	Grant Holt	Nottingham Forest	Blackpool	Loan
20 March 2008	Jem Karacan	Reading	Millwall	Loan
20 March 2008	Therry Racon	Charlton Athletic	Brighton & Hove Albion	Loan
20 March 2008	Luke Steele	West Bromwich Albion	Barnsley	Loan
20 March 2008	Richard Wright	West Ham United	Southampton	Loan
21 March 2008	Kevin Horlock	Scunthorpe United	Mansfield Town	Loan
21 March 2008	Danny Simpson	Manchester United	Ipswich Town	Loan
25 March 2008	Dimitrios Konstantopoulos	Coventry City	Nottingham Forest	Loan
27 March 2008	Shola Ameobi	Newcastle United	Stoke City	Loan
27 March 2008	Nathan Ashton	Fulham	Crystal Palace	Loan
27 March 2008	Michael Barnes	Manchester United	Shrewsbury Town	Loan
27 March 2008	Asmir Begović	Portsmouth	Yeovil Town	Loan
27 March 2008	David Bell	Luton Town	Leicester City	Loan
27 March 2008	Aaron Brown	Reading	Walsall	Loan
27 March 2008	David Button	Tottenham Hotspur	Rochdale	Loan
27 March 2008	Tony Craig	Crystal Palace	Millwall	Loan
27 March 2008	Aidan Downes	Everton	Yeovil Town	Loan
27 March 2008	David Forde	Cardiff City	AFC Bournemouth	Loan
27 March 2008	Stephen Gleeson	Wolverhampton Wanderers	Stockport County	Loan
27 March 2008	Ryan Hall	Crystal Palace	Crawley Town	Loan
27 March 2008	Mitchell Hanson	Derby County	Port Vale	Loan
27 March 2008	Colin Hawkins	Coventry City	Chesterfield	Loan
27 March 2008	Zavon Hines	West Ham United	Coventry City	Loan
27 March 2008	Jeff Hughes	Crystal Palace	Bristol Rovers	Loan
27 March 2008	Steve Jones	Burnley	Crewe Alexandra	Loan
27 March 2008	Jason Kennedy	Middlesbrough	Doncaster Rovers	Loan
27 March 2008	Leroy Lita	Reading	Charlton Athletic	Loan
27 March 2008	Chris Lucketti	Sheffield United	Southampton	Loan
27 March 2008	Joe Martin	Tottenham Hotspur	Blackpool	Loan
27 March 2008	Lewis Montrose	Wigan Athletic	Rochdale	Loan
27 March 2008	Jake Moult	Plymouth Argyle	Kidderminster Harriers	Loan
27 March 2008	Graeme Owens	Middlesbrough	Chesterfield	Loan
27 March 2008	Richard O'Donnell	Sheffield Wednesday	Oldham Athletic	Loan
27 March 2008	Stephen Pearson	Derby County	Stoke City	Loan
27 March 2008	Chris Perry	Luton Town	Southampton	Loan
27 March 2008	Kyel Reid	West Ham United	Crystal Palace	Loan
27 March 2008	Paul Reid	Barnsley	Carlisle United	Loan
27 March 2008	Martin Riley	Wolverhampton Wanderers	Shrewsbury Town	Loan
27 March 2008	Donovan Simmonds	Coventry City	Gillingham	Loan
27 March 2008	Scott Sinclair	Chelsea	Crystal Palace	Loan
27 March 2008	Bartosz Ślusarski	West Bromwich Albion	Sheffield Wednesday	Loan
2 April 2008	Laurent Robert	Derby County	Major League Soccer (Toronto)	Free
15 April 2008	Mikkel Andersen	Reading	Rushden & Diamonds	Loan
17 April 2008	Ruben Zadkovich	Unattached	Derby County	Free
22 April 2008	Steven Pienaar	Borussia Dortmund	Everton	£2.05m
29 April 2008	Luka Modrić	Dinamo Zagreb	Tottenham Hotspur	£16.5m
5 May 2008	Mathieu Flamini	Arsenal	Milan	Free
6 May 2008	Michael Johnson	Derby County	Notts County	Free
6 May 2008	Chris Smalling	Maidstone United	Middlesbrough	Free
8 May 2008	Harry Worley	Chelsea	Leicester City	Free
12 May 2008	José Bosingwa	Porto	Chelsea	£16.2m
13 May 2008	Radek Černý	Slavia Prague	Queens Park Rangers	Free
13 May 2008	Matt Heath	Leeds United	Colchester United	Free
13 May 2008	Peter Ramage	Newcastle United	Queens Park Rangers	Free
15 May 2008	Paul Connolly	Plymouth Argyle	Derby County	Free
19 May 2008	Marcus Bean	Blackpool	Brentford	Free
21 May 2008	Francis Coquelin	Stade Lavallois	Arsenal	Free
21 May 2008	Ashley Grimes	Manchester City	Millwall	Undisclosed
21 May 2008	Kieran Lee	Manchester United	Oldham Athletic	Free
21 May 2008	Luke Steele	West Bromwich Albion	Barnsley	Free
22 May 2008	Mark Schwarzer	Middlesbrough	Fulham	Free
22 May 2008	Ashley Williams	Stockport County	Swansea City	Undisclosed
23 May 2008	Tom Heaton	Manchester United	Cardiff City	Loan
23 May 2008	Mark Hudson	Crystal Palace	Charlton Athletic	Free
23 May 2008	Sam Vokes	AFC Bournemouth	Wolverhampton Wanderers	Undisclosed
25 May 2008	Adam Bygrave	Reading	Weymouth	Free
27 May 2008	Keigan Parker	Blackpool	Huddersfield Town	Free
27 May 2008	Gerard Piqué	Manchester United	Barcelona	Undisclosed
27 May 2008	Garry Thompson	Morecambe	Scunthorpe United	Free
28 May 2008	Kim Do-Heon	Seongnam Ilhwa Chunma	West Bromwich Albion	£550k
28 May 2008	Luke Moore	Aston Villa	West Bromwich Albion	£3m
30 May 2008	Roman Bednář	Hearts	West Bromwich Albion	£2.3m
30 May 2008	Robert Earnshaw	Derby County	Nottingham Forest	£2.65m
30 May 2008	Nathan Ellington	Watford	Derby County	Loan
30 May 2008	Mikael Forssell	Birmingham City	Hannover 96	Free
30 May 2008	Paul Green	Doncaster Rovers	Derby County	Free
30 May 2008	Jason Kennedy	Middlesbrough	Darlington	Free
30 May 2008	Jordan Stewart	Watford	Derby County	Free
2 June 2008	Guillaume Beuzelin	Hibernian	Coventry City	Free
2 June 2008	Kris Commons	Nottingham Forest	Derby County	Free
3 June 2008	Lee Carsley	Everton	Birmingham City	Free
3 June 2008	Matthew Lockwood	Nottingham Forest	Colchester United	Undisclosed
3 June 2008	Kevin McLeod	Colchester United	Brighton & Hove Albion	Free
3 June 2008	Jens Lehmann	Arsenal	Stuttgart	Free
4 June 2008	David Stockdale	Darlington	Fulham	Undisclosed
5 June 2008	Marlon Broomes	Stoke City	Blackpool	Free
5 June 2008	David Forde	Cardiff City	Millwall	Free
5 June 2008	Alan Power	Nottingham Forest	Hartlepool United	Free
6 June 2008	Liam Davis	Coventry City	Northampton Town	Free
6 June 2008	Lee Holmes	Derby County	Southampton	Free
6 June 2008	Jeff Hughes	Crystal Palace	Bristol Rovers	Undisclosed
6 June 2008	Chris Perry	Luton Town	Southampton	Free
9 June 2008	Kevin Amankwaah	Swansea City	Swindon Town	Free
9 June 2008	Adam Legzdins	Birmingham City	Crewe Alexandra	Free
10 June 2008	Giovani dos Santos	Barcelona	Tottenham Hotspur	£4.7m
10 June 2008	David Rozehnal	Newcastle United	Lazio	£2.9m
11 June 2008	Zoltan Gera	West Bromwich Albion	Fulham	Free
12 June 2008	Steve Davies	Tranmere Rovers	Derby County	Tribunal
12 June 2008	Paddy McCarthy	Charlton Athletic	Crystal Palace	Undisclosed
12 June 2008	Andranik Teymourian	Bolton Wanderers	Fulham	Free
13 June 2008	Aaron Ramsey	Cardiff City	Arsenal	£5m
13 June 2008	Kenny Miller	Derby County	Rangers	£2m
16 June 2008	Pim Balkestein	SC Heerenveen	Ipswich Town	Undisclosed
16 June 2008	Stuart Fleetwood	Forest Green Rovers	Charlton Athletic	Tribunal
16 June 2008	Fabrice Muamba	Birmingham City	Bolton Wanderers	£5m
16 June 2008	Lewwis Spence	Crystal Palace	Wycombe Wanderers	Free
17 June 2008	Sammy Clingan	Nottingham Forest	Norwich City	Free
17 June 2008	Ben Hamer	Reading	Brentford	Loan
17 June 2008	Leigh Mills	Tottenham Hotspur	Brentford	Loan
17 June 2008	Alex Russell	Bristol City	Cheltenham Town	Free
17 June 2008	John Spicer	Burnley	Doncaster Rovers	Free
18 June 2008	Gareth McAuley	Leicester City	Ipswich Town	Undisclosed
18 June 2008	Jason Puncheon	Barnet	Plymouth Argyle	£250k
18 June 2008	John Arne Riise	Liverpool	Roma	£4m
18 June 2008	Keiren Westwood	Carlisle United	Coventry City	£500k
18 June 2008	Paul Wotton	Plymouth Argyle	Southampton	Free
19 June 2008	Stefan Bailey	Queens Park Rangers	Grays Athletic	Free
19 June 2008	Kyle Lafferty	Burnley	Rangers	£3m
20 June 2008	Julius Aghahowa	Wigan Athletic	Kayserispor	Undisclosed
20 June 2008	Glen Little	Reading	Portsmouth	Undisclosed
20 June 2008	Danny Whitaker	Port Vale	Oldham Athletic	Free
23 June 2008	Osei Sankofa	Charlton Athletic	Southend United	Free
24 June 2008	Karl Duguid	Colchester United	Plymouth Argyle	Undisclosed
24 June 2008	Grant Holt	Nottingham Forest	Shrewsbury Town	£170k
24 June 2008	Michael Jackson	Blackpool	Shrewsbury Town	Free
24 June 2008	Kevin McDonald	Dundee	Burnley	£500k
25 June 2008	Iain Hume	Leicester City	Barnsley	£1.2m
25 June 2008	Richard Stearman	Leicester City	Wolverhampton Wanderers	Undisclosed
26 June 2008	Paul Anderson	Liverpool	Nottingham Forest	Loan
26 June 2008	Matthew Gilks	Norwich City	Blackpool	Undisclosed
26 June 2008	Heurelho Gomes	PSV Eindhoven	Tottenham Hotspur	Undisclosed
26 June 2008	Wes Hoolahan	Blackpool	Norwich City	Undisclosed
26 June 2008	Christian Kalvenes	Dundee United	Burnley	Free
27 June 2008	Daniel Braaten	Bolton Wanderers	Toulouse	Undisclosed
27 June 2008	Hugo Roberto Colace	Newell's Old Boys	Barnsley	Undisclosed
27 June 2008	Mounir El Haimour	Neuchâtel Xamax	Barnsley	Undisclosed
27 June 2008	Johan Elmander	Toulouse	Bolton Wanderers	Undisclosed
27 June 2008	Mark Gower	Southend United	Swansea City	Free
27 June 2008	David Jones	Derby County	Wolverhampton Wanderers	Undisclosed
27 June 2008	Emmanuel Ledesma	Genoa	Queens Park Rangers	Loan
27 June 2008	James O'Connor	Burnley	Sheffield Wednesday	Free
27 June 2008	Diego Penny	Coronel Bolognesi	Burnley	Undisclosed
27 June 2008	Morgan Schneiderlin	Strasbourg	Southampton	Undisclosed
27 June 2008	Gavin Williams	Ipswich Town	Bristol City	Undisclosed
28 June 2008	Federico Bessone	Espanyol	Swansea City	Free
28 June 2008	Darren Dennehy	Everton	Cardiff City	Free
28 June 2008	Ross McCormack	Motherwell	Cardiff City	Free
30 June 2008	Deco	Barcelona	Chelsea	Undisclosed
30 June 2008	Burton O'Brien	Sheffield Wednesday	Falkirk	Free
1 July 2008	Martin Albrechtsen	West Bromwich Albion	Derby County	Free
1 July 2008	Nick Carle	Bristol City	Crystal Palace	Undisclosed
1 July 2008	Samuel Di Carmine	Fiorentina	Queens Park Rangers	Loan
1 July 2008	Liam Dickinson	Stockport County	Derby County	£750k
1 July 2008	Guy Moussi	Angers	Nottingham Forest	Undisclosed
1 July 2008	Barry Nicholson	Aberdeen	Preston North End	Free
1 July 2008	Daniël de Ridder	Birmingham City	Wigan Athletic	Free
1 July 2008	Stephen Roberts	Doncaster Rovers	Walsall	Free
1 July 2008	Ben Sahar	Chelsea	Portsmouth	Loan
1 July 2008	Albert Serrán	Espanyol	Swansea City	£80k
2 July 2008	Cedric Baseya	Southampton	Lille	Free
2 July 2008	Garry Breen	Manchester City	Hereford United	Undisclosed
2 July 2008	Andrew Cave-Brown	Norwich City	Leyton Orient	Free
2 July 2008	Craig Fagan	Derby County	Hull City	£750k
2 July 2008	Jonás Gutiérrez	Real Mallorca	Newcastle United	Undisclosed
2 July 2008	Greg Halford	Sunderland	Sheffield United	Loan
2 July 2008	Andreas Isaksson	Manchester City	PSV Eindhoven	Undisclosed
2 July 2008	Jô	CSKA Moscow	Manchester City	Undisclosed
2 July 2008	Jamie Jones	Everton	Leyton Orient	Free
2 July 2008	Anthony Le Tallec	Liverpool	Le Mans	Undisclosed
2 July 2008	Paul Reid	Barnsley	Colchester United	Free
2 July 2008	Jimmy Smith	Chelsea	Sheffield Wednesday	Loan
2 July 2008	Sun Jihai	Manchester City	Sheffield United	Free
3 July 2008	Jimmy Abdou	Plymouth Argyle	Millwall	Free
3 July 2008	Curtis Davies	West Bromwich Albion	Aston Villa	Undisclosed
3 July 2008	Philipp Degen	Borussia Dortmund	Liverpool	Free
3 July 2008	Darryl Duffy	Swansea City	Bristol Rovers	£100k
3 July 2008	Johannes Ertl	Austria Vienna	Crystal Palace	Undisclosed
3 July 2008	Darryl Flahavan	Southend United	Crystal Palace	Free
3 July 2008	David Livermore	Hull City	Brighton & Hove Albion	Free
3 July 2008	Mark McCammon	Doncaster Rovers	Gillingham	Free
3 July 2008	Darren Moore	Derby County	Barnsley	Free
3 July 2008	Gianni Zuiverloon	SC Heerenveen	West Bromwich Albion	£3.2m
4 July 2008	Didier Digard	Paris Saint-Germain	Middlesbrough	£4m
4 July 2008	Graham Dorrans	Livingston	West Bromwich Albion	£100k
4 July 2008	Andrea Dossena	Udinese	Liverpool	Undisclosed
4 July 2008	Marvin Emnes	Sparta Rotterdam	Middlesbrough	£3.2m
4 July 2008	Hólmar Örn Eyjólfsson	HK	West Ham United	Undisclosed
4 July 2008	Toni Kallio	Young Boys	Fulham	Free
4 July 2008	Joe Martin	Tottenham Hotspur	Blackpool	Undisclosed
5 July 2008	Ryan Bertrand	Chelsea	Norwich City	Loan
5 July 2008	Geovanni	Manchester City	Hull City	Free
5 July 2008	Harry Kewell	Liverpool	Galatasaray	Free
5 July 2008	Chris Lucketti	Sheffield United	Huddersfield Town	Free
7 July 2008	Andrew Cole	Sunderland	Nottingham Forest	Free
7 July 2008	Warren Feeney	Cardiff City	Dundee United	Loan
7 July 2008	Stuart Fleetwood	Forest Green Rovers	Charlton Athletic	Undisclosed
7 July 2008	Tommy Forecast	Tottenham Hotspur	Southampton	Undisclosed
7 July 2008	Remco van der Schaaf	Vitesse Arnhem	Burnley	Free
8 July 2008	Junior Agogo	Nottingham Forest	El Zamalek	Undisclosed
8 July 2008	Toumani Diagouraga	Watford	Hereford United	Free
8 July 2008	Darren Way	Swansea City	Yeovil Town	Undisclosed
9 July 2008	Kevin Phillips	West Bromwich Albion	Birmingham City	Free
9 July 2008	Slobodan Rajković	Chelsea	Twente	Loan
10 July 2008	Kerrea Gilbert	Arsenal	Leicester City	Loan
10 July 2008	Mark Kennedy	Crystal Palace	Cardiff City	Free
10 July 2008	Stefan Morrison	West Bromwich Albion	Swansea City	Free
10 July 2008	Steve Sidwell	Chelsea	Aston Villa	£5m
10 July 2008	Vincent Weijl	AZ	Liverpool	Undisclosed
11 July 2008	Diego Cavalieri	Palmeiras	Liverpool	Undisclosed
11 July 2008	Jake Cole	Queens Park Rangers	Oxford United	Loan
11 July 2008	Tony Craig	Crystal Palace	Millwall	Undisclosed
11 July 2008	Peter Crouch	Liverpool	Portsmouth	£9m
11 July 2008	Freddy Eastwood	Wolverhampton Wanderers	Coventry City	£1.2m
11 July 2008	Danny Guthrie	Liverpool	Newcastle United	Undisclosed
11 July 2008	Steve Kabba	Watford	Blackpool	Loan
11 July 2008	Bernard Mendy	Unattached	Hull City	Free
11 July 2008	Samir Nasri	Marseille	Arsenal	Undisclosed
11 July 2008	Darren Randolph	Charlton Athletic	Hereford United	Loan
11 July 2008	Jermaine Wright	Unattached	Blackpool	Free
12 July 2008	Raffaele De Vita	Blackburn Rovers	Livingston	Free
14 July 2008	Darren Huckerby	Norwich City	Major League Soccer (San Jose Earthquakes)	Free
14 July 2008	Chris Iwelumo	Charlton Athletic	Wolverhampton Wanderers	Undisclosed
15 July 2008	Marek Čech	Porto	West Bromwich Albion	£1.4m
15 July 2008	John Paintsil	West Ham United	Fulham	Undisclosed
15 July 2008	Georgios Samaras	Manchester City	Celtic	Undisclosed
15 July 2008	Bobby Zamora	West Ham United	Fulham	Undisclosed
16 July 2008	Marcus Bent	Charlton Athletic	Birmingham City	Undisclosed
16 July 2008	George Boateng	Middlesbrough	Hull City	Undisclosed
16 July 2008	Péter Halmosi	Plymouth Argyle	Hull City	Undisclosed
16 July 2008	Alexander Hleb	Arsenal	Barcelona	£11.8m
16 July 2008	Olivier Kapo	Birmingham City	Wigan Athletic	£2.5m
16 July 2008	Tony Warner	Fulham	Hull City	Free
17 July 2008	Yala Bolasie	Floriana	Plymouth Argyle	Undisclosed
17 July 2008	Gilberto Silva	Arsenal	Panathinaikos	£1m
17 July 2008	Andreas Granqvist	Wigan Athletic	Groningen	Undisclosed
17 July 2008	Jon Harley	Burnley	Watford	Free
18 July 2008	Calvin Andrew	Luton Town	Crystal Palace	Undisclosed
18 July 2008	Scott Carson	Liverpool	West Bromwich Albion	£3.25m
18 July 2008	Adam Hammill	Liverpool	Blackpool	Loan
18 July 2008	Dave Kitson	Reading	Stoke City	£5.5m
18 July 2008	Kevin Lisbie	Colchester United	Ipswich Town	Undisclosed
18 July 2008	Graham Stack	Unattached	Plymouth Argyle	Free
19 July 2008	Elliot Omozusi	Fulham	Norwich City	Loan
19 July 2008	Dejan Stefanovic	Fulham	Norwich City	Undisclosed
21 July 2008	Rob Hulse	Sheffield United	Derby County	£1.75m
21 July 2008	Przemysław Kaźmierczak	Porto	Derby County	Loan
21 July 2008	Claude Makélélé	Chelsea	Paris Saint-Germain	Free
21 July 2008	Richard Wright	West Ham United	Ipswich Town	Undisclosed
22 July 2008	Tomi Ameobi	Leeds United	Doncaster Rovers	Undisclosed
22 July 2008	Jason Beardsley	Derby County	Notts County	Loan
22 July 2008	Febian Brandy	Manchester United	Swansea City	Loan
22 July 2008	Darius Henderson	Watford	Sheffield United	£2m
22 July 2008	Arturo Lupoli	Fiorentina	Norwich City	Loan
22 July 2008	Arnau Riera	Sunderland	Falkirk	Loan
22 July 2008	Amr Zaki	Zamalek	Wigan Athletic	Loan
23 July 2008	Matt Bailey	Wolverhampton Wanderers	Burton Albion	Loan
23 July 2008	Valon Behrami	Lazio	West Ham United	£5m
23 July 2008	David Bell	Luton Town	Norwich City	Undisclosed
23 July 2008	Scott Davies	Reading	Aldershot Town	Loan
23 July 2008	José Fonte	Benfica	Crystal Palace	Undisclosed
23 July 2008	Emmanuel Mendy	Murcia Deportivo	Liverpool	Free
23 July 2008	Ben Starosta	Sheffield United	Aldershot Town	Loan
23 July 2008	Teemu Tainio	Tottenham Hotspur	Sunderland	Undisclosed
23 July 2008	Simon Thomas	Boreham Wood	Crystal Palace	Undisclosed
24 July 2008	Michael Bridges	Hull City	Carlisle United	Loan
24 July 2008	Nick Colgan	Unattached	Sunderland	Free
24 July 2008	David Ngog	Paris Saint-Germain	Liverpool	Undisclosed
24 July 2008	Luton Shelton	Sheffield United	Vålerenga	£1m
25 July 2008	Godwin Antwi	Liverpool	Tranmere Rovers	Loan
25 July 2008	Nathan Ashton	Fulham	Wycombe Wanderers	Undisclosed
25 July 2008	Joe Garner	Carlisle United	Nottingham Forest	£1.14m
25 July 2008	Jack Hobbs	Liverpool	Leicester City	Loan
25 July 2008	David Meyler	Cork City	Sunderland	Undisclosed
25 July 2008	Paul Robinson	Tottenham Hotspur	Blackburn Rovers	£3.5m
26 July 2008	Pascal Chimbonda	Tottenham Hotspur	Sunderland	Undisclosed
26 July 2008	Brad Friedel	Blackburn Rovers	Aston Villa	Undisclosed
26 July 2008	Seyi Olofinjana	Wolverhampton Wanderers	Stoke City	£3m
27 July 2008	John Kennedy	Celtic	Norwich City	Loan
28 July 2008	Jamie Clarke	Blackburn Rovers	Accrington Stanley	Loan
28 July 2008	El Hadji Diouf	Bolton Wanderers	Sunderland	Undisclosed
28 July 2008	Anthony Gardner	Tottenham Hotspur	Hull City	Loan
28 July 2008	Robbie Keane	Tottenham Hotspur	Liverpool	£19m
28 July 2008	Sulley Muntari	Portsmouth	Internazionale	£12.7m
28 July 2008	Mustapha Riga	Levante	Bolton Wanderers	Undisclosed
29 July 2008	Elliott Bennett	Wolverhampton Wanderers	Bury	Loan
29 July 2008	Lee Cattermole	Middlesbrough	Wigan Athletic	Undisclosed
29 July 2008	Chris Eagles	Manchester United	Burnley	Undisclosed
29 July 2008	Gary Roberts	Ipswich Town	Huddersfield Town	Undisclosed
30 July 2008	Kemy Agustien	AZ	Birmingham City	Loan
30 July 2008	Tal Ben Haim	Chelsea	Manchester City	Undisclosed
30 July 2008	David Bentley	Blackburn Rovers	Tottenham Hotspur	£15m
30 July 2008	Amaury Bischoff	Werder Bremen	Arsenal	Undisclosed
30 July 2008	Brian McBride	Fulham	Major League Soccer (Chicago Fire)	Free
30 July 2008	Steed Malbranque	Tottenham Hotspur	Sunderland	Undisclosed
30 July 2008	Thomas Sørensen	Aston Villa	Stoke City	Free
30 July 2008	Fredrik Stoor	Rosenborg	Fulham	Undisclosed
31 July 2008	Madjid Bougherra	Charlton Athletic	Rangers	£2.5m
31 July 2008	Lee Collins	Wolverhampton Wanderers	Port Vale	Loan
31 July 2008	David Cotterill	Wigan Athletic	Sheffield United	Undisclosed
31 July 2008	Kaspars Gorkšs	Blackpool	Queens Park Rangers	Undisclosed
31 July 2008	Nicky Maynard	Crewe Alexandra	Bristol City	£2.25m
31 July 2008	Matthew Mills	Manchester City	Doncaster Rovers	£300k
31 July 2008	Daniel Nardiello	Queens Park Rangers	Blackpool	Free
31 July 2008	Zesh Rehman	Queens Park Rangers	Blackpool	Loan
31 July 2008	Ross Wallace	Sunderland	Preston North End	Loan
1 August 2008	Luke Daniels	West Bromwich Albion	Shrewsbury Town	Loan
1 August 2008	Brad Guzan	Major League Soccer (Chivas USA)	Aston Villa	Undisclosed
2 August 2008	Carlos Villanueva	Audax Italiano	Blackburn Rovers	Loan
3 August 2008	Dani Parejo	Real Madrid	Queens Park Rangers	Loan
4 August 2008	Shaun Cummings	Chelsea	MK Dons	Loan
4 August 2008	Omar Koroma	Banjul Hawks	Portsmouth	Undisclosed
4 August 2008	Omar Koroma	Portsmouth	Norwich City	Loan
4 August 2008	Jan Laštůvka	Shakhtar Donetsk	West Ham United	Loan
4 August 2008	David Martin	Liverpool	Leicester City	Loan
4 August 2008	Danny Simpson	Manchester United	Blackburn Rovers	Loan
4 August 2008	David Vaughan	Real Sociedad	Blackpool	£200k
5 August 2008	Moses Ashikodi	Watford	Hereford United	Loan
5 August 2008	Jay Bothroyd	Wolverhampton Wanderers	Cardiff City	£300k
5 August 2008	Mo Camara	Derby County	Blackpool	Loan
5 August 2008	James Chambers	Leicester City	Doncaster Rovers	Free
5 August 2008	Sebastián Leto	Liverpool	Olympiacos	Loan
6 August 2008	Rob Edwards	Wolverhampton Wanderers	Blackpool	Undisclosed
6 August 2008	Julio Santa Cruz	Cerro Porteño	Blackburn Rovers	Undisclosed
6 August 2008	Danny Shittu	Watford	Bolton Wanderers	Undisclosed
6 August 2008	Simon Walton	Queens Park Rangers	Plymouth Argyle	Undisclosed
6 August 2008	Pascal Zuberbühler	Neuchâtel Xamax	Fulham	Free
7 August 2008	Asmir Begović	Portsmouth	Yeovil Town	Loan
7 August 2008	Paddy Gamble	Nottingham Forest	Mansfield Town	Loan
7 August 2008	Anthony Grant	Chelsea	Southend United	Free
7 August 2008	Andrew Johnson	Everton	Fulham	Undisclosed
7 August 2008	Artur Krysiak	Birmingham City	York City	Loan
7 August 2008	Clinton Morrison	Unattached	Coventry City	Free
7 August 2008	Quincy Owusu-Abeyie	Spartak Moscow	Birmingham City	Loan
7 August 2008	Nicky Shorey	Reading	Aston Villa	Undisclosed
7 August 2008	Joel Ward	Portsmouth	AFC Bournemouth	Loan
7 August 2008	Luke Young	Middlesbrough	Aston Villa	Undisclosed
8 August 2008	Frankie Artus	Bristol City	Brentford	Loan
8 August 2008	Alan Bennett	Reading	Brentford	Loan
8 August 2008	Besart Berisha	Burnley	Rosenborg	Loan
8 August 2008	Craig Cathcart	Manchester United	Plymouth Argyle	Loan
8 August 2008	Billy Clarke	Ipswich Town	Darlington	Loan
8 August 2008	Stephen Gleeson	Wolverhampton Wanderers	Stockport County	Loan
8 August 2008	Dan Harding	Ipswich Town	Southend United	Loan
8 August 2008	TJ Moncur	Fulham	Bradford City	Loan
8 August 2008	Mark Oxley	Rotherham United	Hull City	£150k
8 August 2008	Maceo Rigters	Blackburn Rovers	Barnsley	Loan
8 August 2008	James Wilson	Bristol City	Brentford	Loan
8 August 2008	Stephen Wright	Unattached	Coventry City	Free
9 August 2008	Hamer Bouazza	Fulham	Charlton Athletic	Loan
10 August 2008	Abdoulaye Méïté	Bolton Wanderers	West Bromwich Albion	£2m
11 August 2008	Chris Barker	Queens Park Rangers	Plymouth Argyle	Undisclosed
11 August 2008	Iván Campo	Unattached	Ipswich Town	Free
11 August 2008	Leandre Griffit	Elfsborg	Crystal Palace	Free
11 August 2008	Younes Kaboul	Tottenham Hotspur	Portsmouth	Undisclosed
11 August 2008	John Oster	Unattached	Crystal Palace	Free
12 August 2008	Carlos Cuéllar	Rangers	Aston Villa	£7.8m
12 August 2008	César Sánchez	Real Zaragoza	Tottenham Hotspur	Undisclosed
12 August 2008	Vincent van den Berg	Arsenal	Zwolle	Loan
13 August 2008	Nicky Bailey	Southend United	Charlton Athletic	Undisclosed
13 August 2008	Lee Martin	Manchester United	Nottingham Forest	Loan
13 August 2008	Donovan Simmonds	Coventry City	Kilmarnock	Loan
14 August 2008	Trevor Carson	Sunderland	Chesterfield	Loan
14 August 2008	Anthony Gardner	Tottenham Hotspur	Hull City	£2.5m
14 August 2008	Marlon King	Wigan Athletic	Hull City	Loan
14 August 2008	Jennison Myrie-Williams	Bristol City	Cheltenham Town	Loan
14 August 2008	Craig Noone	Southport	Plymouth Argyle	Undisclosed
14 August 2008	Ben Thatcher	Unattached	Ipswich Town	Free
15 August 2008	Fabricio Coloccini	Deportivo	Newcastle United	Undisclosed
15 August 2008	Abdoulaye Faye	Newcastle United	Stoke City	£2.25m
15 August 2008	Amdy Faye	Charlton Athletic	Stoke City	Undisclosed
15 August 2008	Benny Feilhaber	Derby County	AGF	Undisclosed
15 August 2008	Pedro Mendes	Portsmouth	Rangers	£3m
15 August 2008	Claudio Pizarro	Chelsea	Werder Bremen	Loan
15 August 2008	Grzegorz Rasiak	Southampton	Watford	Loan
15 August 2008	Adam Rooney	Stoke City	Inverness Caledonian Thistle	£50k
15 August 2008	Gary Teale	Derby County	Barnsley	Loan
15 August 2008	Aswad Thomas	Charlton Athletic	Barnet	Loan
15 August 2008	Jerome Thomas	Charlton Athletic	Portsmouth	Loan
16 August 2008	Justin Hoyte	Arsenal	Middlesbrough	£3m
16 August 2008	Glenn Loovens	Cardiff City	Celtic	£2.5m
18 August 2008	Håvard Nordtveit	Arsenal	Salamanca	Loan
18 August 2008	Lee Sawyer	Chelsea	Southend United	Loan
18 August 2008	Dean Sinclair	Charlton Athletic	Cheltenham Town	Loan
18 August 2008	Scott Wagstaff	Charlton Athletic	AFC Bournemouth	Loan
18 August 2008	Andy Webster	Rangers	Bristol City	Loan
19 August 2008	Nacer Barazite	Arsenal	Derby County	Loan
19 August 2008	Andrew Davies	Southampton	Stoke City	£1.3m
19 August 2008	Liam Dickinson	Derby County	Huddersfield Town	Loan
19 August 2008	Gábor Gyepes	Northampton Town	Cardiff City	Undisclosed
19 August 2008	Krystian Pearce	Birmingham City	Scunthorpe United	Loan
20 August 2008	Jack Cork	Chelsea	Southampton	Loan
20 August 2008	Richard Keogh	Bristol City	Carlisle United	Undisclosed
20 August 2008	David Mooney	Cork City	Reading	Undisclosed
20 August 2008	Mikaël Silvestre	Manchester United	Arsenal	Undisclosed
21 August 2008	Djibril Cissé	Marseille	Sunderland	Loan
21 August 2008	Steven Davis	Fulham	Rangers	£3m
21 August 2008	David Healy	Fulham	Sunderland	Undisclosed
21 August 2008	Eddie Lewis	Derby County	Major League Soccer (Los Angeles Galaxy)	Free
21 August 2008	Tony McMahon	Middlesbrough	Sheffield Wednesday	Loan
21 August 2008	Fábio Paím	Sporting CP	Chelsea	Loan
21 August 2008	Hal Robson-Kanu	Reading	Southend United	Loan
21 August 2008	Jerome Thomas	Charlton Athletic	Portsmouth	Undisclosed
21 August 2008	Armand Traoré	Arsenal	Portsmouth	Loan
22 August 2008	Eddie Johnson	Fulham	Cardiff City	Loan
22 August 2008	Vincent Kompany	Hamburg	Manchester City	Undisclosed
22 August 2008	Craig Lindfield	Liverpool	AFC Bournemouth	Loan
22 August 2008	Mark Little	Wolverhampton Wanderers	Northampton Town	Loan
22 August 2008	Shaun Maloney	Aston Villa	Celtic	Undisclosed
22 August 2008	Borja Valero	Mallorca	West Bromwich Albion	£4.7m
23 August 2008	Rolando Bianchi	Manchester City	Torino	Undisclosed
24 August 2008	Simon Church	Reading	Wycombe Wanderers	Loan
25 August 2008	Andriy Shevchenko	Chelsea	Milan	Undisclosed
26 August 2008	Russell Anderson	Sunderland	Burnley	Loan
26 August 2008	Chris Armstrong	Sheffield United	Reading	£500k
26 August 2008	Charlie Daniels	Tottenham Hotspur	Gillingham	Loan
26 August 2008	James Dayton	Crystal Palace	Yeovil Town	Loan
26 August 2008	Vince Grella	Torino	Blackburn Rovers	Undisclosed
26 August 2008	Lars Jacobsen	Unattached	Everton	Free
26 August 2008	Tomáš Pekhart	Tottenham Hotspur	Southampton	Loan
27 August 2008	Anton Ferdinand	West Ham United	Sunderland	Undisclosed
27 August 2008	Lee Young-Pyo	Tottenham Hotspur	Borussia Dortmund	Undisclosed
27 August 2008	Philippe Senderos	Arsenal	Milan	Loan
28 August 2008	Keith Andrews	Milton Keynes Dons	Blackburn Rovers	Undisclosed
28 August 2008	Segundo Castillo	Red Star Belgrade	Everton	Loan
28 August 2008	Jared Hodgkiss	West Bromwich Albion	Aberdeen	Loan
28 August 2008	Linvoy Primus	Portsmouth	Charlton Athletic	Loan
28 August 2008	Moritz Volz	Fulham	Ipswich Town	Loan
28 August 2008	Shaun Wright-Phillips	Chelsea	Manchester City	Undisclosed
29 August 2008	Chris Casement	Ipswich Town	Hamilton Academical	Loan
29 August 2008	Dickson Etuhu	Sunderland	Fulham	Undisclosed
29 August 2008	Alan Lee	Ipswich Town	Crystal Palace	£600k
29 August 2008	James Milner	Newcastle United	Aston Villa	£12m
29 August 2008	Karl Moore	Manchester City	Millwall	Loan
29 August 2008	Jon Parkin	Stoke City	Preston North End	Loan
29 August 2008	Anthony Pulis	Stoke City	Southampton	Free
29 August 2008	Ryan Shotton	Stoke City	Tranmere Rovers	Loan
29 August 2008	Ebi Smolarek	Racing Santander	Bolton Wanderers	Loan
29 August 2008	Ibrahima Sonko	Reading	Stoke City	£2m
29 August 2008	Tom Taiwo	Chelsea	Port Vale	Loan
30 August 2008	Paul McShane	Sunderland	Hull City	Loan
31 August 2008	Gláuber	Nürnberg	Manchester City	Undisclosed
31 August 2008	Jonas Olsson	NEC	West Bromwich Albion	£800k
31 August 2008	Pablo Zabaleta	Espanyol	Manchester City	Undisclosed
31 August 2008	Kamil Zayatte	Young Boys	Hull City	Loan
1 September 2008	John Akinde	Ebbsfleet United	Bristol City	£140k
1 September 2008	Sone Aluko	Birmingham City	Aberdeen	£50k
1 September 2008	Nadir Belhadj	Lens	Portsmouth	Loan
1 September 2008	Dimitar Berbatov	Tottenham Hotspur	Manchester United	£30.75m
1 September 2008	Rachid Bouaouzan	Wigan Athletic	NEC	Loan
1 September 2008	Mark Bunn	Northampton Town	Blackburn Rovers	Undisclosed
1 September 2008	Fraizer Campbell	Manchester United	Tottenham Hotspur	Loan
1 September 2008	Jean-Francois Christophe	Portsmouth	Southend United	Loan
1 September 2008	Vedran Ćorluka	Manchester City	Tottenham Hotspur	£8.5m
1 September 2008	Daniel Cousin	Rangers	Hull City	Undisclosed
1 September 2008	Ryan Donk	AZ	West Bromwich Albion	Loan
1 September 2008	Blerim Dzemaili	Bolton Wanderers	Torino	Loan
1 September 2008	Stephen Elliott	Wolverhampton Wanderers	Preston North End	Undisclosed
1 September 2008	Marouane Fellaini	Standard Liège	Everton	£15m
1 September 2008	Steve Finnan	Liverpool	Espanyol	Undisclosed
1 September 2008	Vitor Flora	Botafogo	Liverpool	Free
1 September 2008	Dougie Freedman	Crystal Palace	Southend United	Free
1 September 2008	George Friend	Exeter City	Wolverhampton Wanderers	Undisclosed
1 September 2008	Paul Gallagher	Blackburn Rovers	Plymouth Argyle	Loan
1 September 2008	Romain Gasmi	Strasbourg	Southampton	Loan
1 September 2008	Ignacio González	Valencia	Newcastle United	Loan
1 September 2008	Julian Gray	Coventry City	Fulham	Loan
1 September 2008	Jonathan Grounds	Middlesbrough	Norwich City	Loan
1 September 2008	Péter Gulácsi	MTK Hungária	Liverpool	Undisclosed
1 September 2008	Danny Higginbotham	Sunderland	Stoke City	Undisclosed
1 September 2008	Matt Hill	Preston North End	Wolverhampton Wanderers	Undisclosed
1 September 2008	Viktor Illugason	Reading	Eastbourne Borough	Loan
1 September 2008	Collins John	Fulham	NEC	Free
1 September 2008	Nicolas Marin	Lorient	Plymouth Argyle	Loan
1 September 2008	George McCartney	West Ham United	Sunderland	Undisclosed
1 September 2008	Tyrone Mears	Derby County	Marseille	Loan
1 September 2008	Carlo Nash	Wigan Athletic	Everton	Undisclosed
1 September 2008	Jon Parkin	Stoke City	Preston North End	Undisclosed
1 September 2008	Roman Pavlyuchenko	Spartak Moscow	Tottenham Hotspur	£14m
1 September 2008	Albert Riera	Espanyol	Liverpool	Undisclosed
1 September 2008	Robinho	Real Madrid	Manchester City	£32.5m
1 September 2008	Louis Saha	Manchester United	Everton	Undisclosed
1 September 2008	Jason Shackell	Norwich City	Wolverhampton Wanderers	Undisclosed
1 September 2008	Antoine Sibierski	Wigan Athletic	Norwich City	Loan
1 September 2008	Tom Soares	Crystal Palace	Stoke City	£1.25m
1 September 2008	Ben Starosta	Sheffield United	Lechia Gdańsk	Loan
1 September 2008	Jon Stead	Sheffield United	Ipswich Town	Loan
1 September 2008	Steven Thompson	Cardiff City	Burnley	Free
1 September 2008	Michael Tonge	Sheffield United	Stoke City	£2m
1 September 2008	Javan Vidal	Manchester City	Grimsby Town	Loan
1 September 2008	Andriy Voronin	Liverpool	Hertha BSC	Loan
1 September 2008	Xisco	Deportivo La Coruña	Newcastle United	Undisclosed
1 September 2008	Gabriel Zakuani	Fulham	Peterborough United	Loan

- ^1 Player officially joined his new club on 1 July 2008.

== Notes and references ==
- "Transfers – February 2008". BBC Sport. 29 February 2008.
- "Transfers – March 2008". BBC Sport. 27 March 2008.
- "Transfers – April 2008". BBC Sport. 17 April 2008.
- "Transfers – May 2008". BBC Sport. 31 May 2008.
- "Transfers – June 2008". BBC Sport. 30 June 2008.
- "Transfers – July 2008". BBC Sport. 1 August 2008.
- "Transfers – August 2008". BBC Sport. 31 August 2008.
- "Transfers – Transfer deadline day". BBC Sport. 1 September 2008.
