= Goidschalxoord =

- Hamlet
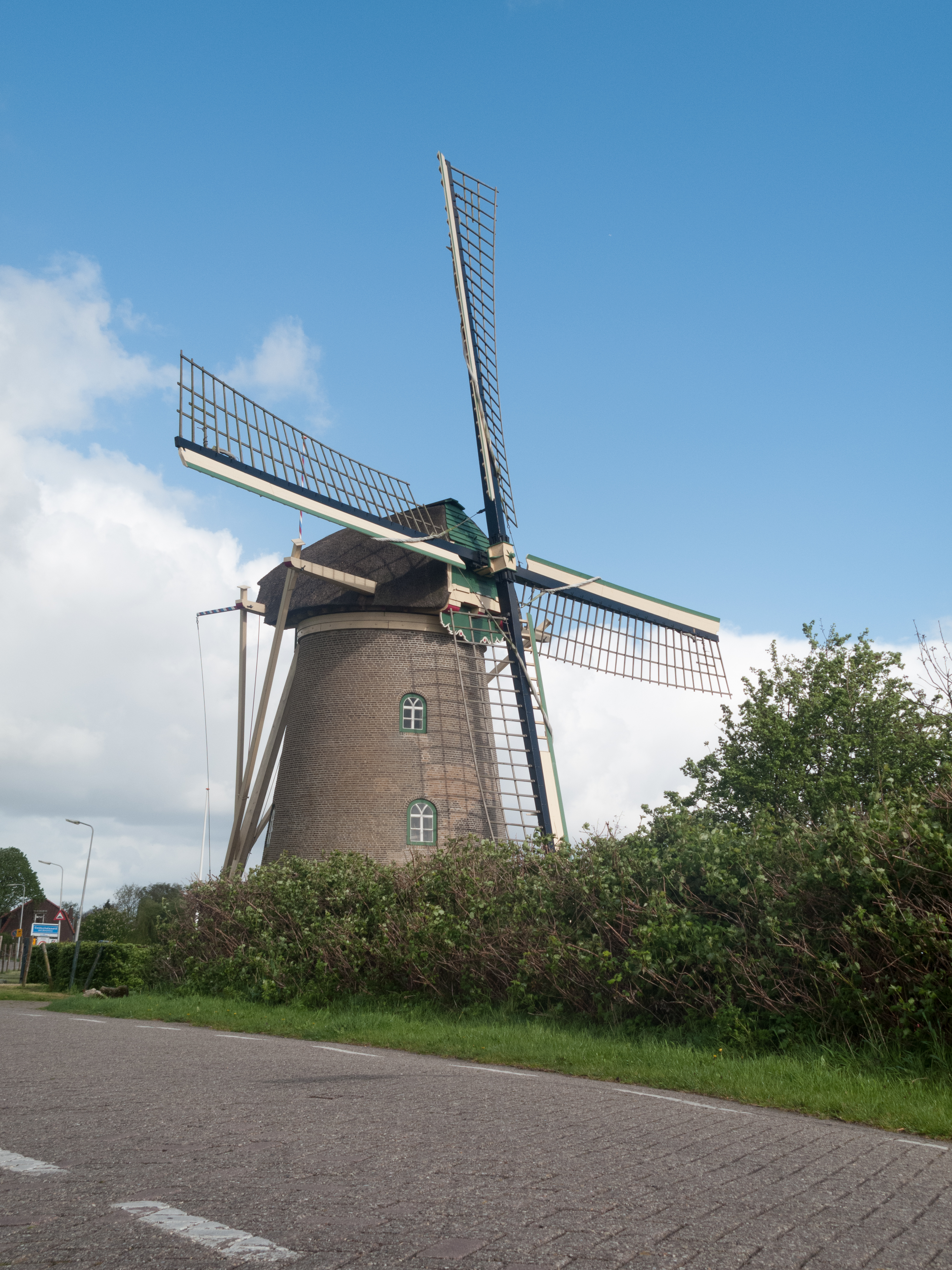
- The windmill of Goidschalxoord

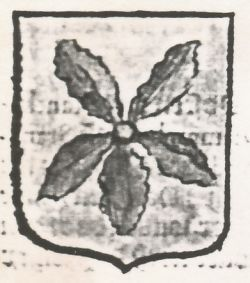
- Coat of arms

- Location in the province of South Holland in the Netherlands Location in the Netherlands
- Coordinates: 51°49′37″N 4°27′34″E
- Country: Netherlands
- Province: South Holland
- Municipality: Hoeksche Waard

Goidschalxoord (Dutch pronunciation: [ˈɣoːtsxɑl(ə)ksoːrt]) is a hamlet in the Dutch province of South Holland. It is located about 5 km east of Oud-Beijerland, in the municipality of Hoeksche Waard.

== History ==
A ferry from Goidschalxoord to Rhoon existed before 1537. In 1888, a bridge was built, and in 1941, the ferry was taken out of service. The bridge was demolished after the Heinenoordtunnel on the A29 opened. The current name was first attested in 1841, and refers to Goidschalck Oelm who was the ambachtsheer (predecessor of mayor).

The nameless grist mill of Goidschalxoord was built in 1718. In 1931, a diesel motor was installed. The windmill was in service until c. 1953. In 2007, the ownership was transferred to a foundation who won the BankGiro Loterij Restauratie, and received €1 million. In 2011, the windmill returned to active service.

Goidschalxoord was a separate municipality between 1817 and 1855, when it merged with Heinenoord.

Goidschalxoord is not a statistical entity, and considered part of Heinenoord. It has place name signs, and consists of about 100 houses.
