= SV Someren =

Association football club in Someren, Netherlands

- Full name: Sportvereniging Someren
- Founded: 27 April 1944; 81 years ago
- Ground: Sports park De Potacker, Someren
- Capacity: 2000
- League: Tweede Klasse Sunday (Men's) (2021/22); Hoofdklasse (women) Sunday (Women's) (2021/22)
- Website: https://www.svsomeren.nl/
Home colours

SV Someren is an amateur football club from Someren, Netherlands. Their home games are played at sports park De Potacker.

== History ==
The club was founded on 27 April 1944. In 1945 it received official recognition from the KNVB and started playing in the tweede klasse Noord-Brabant and in 1947 where promoted into eerste afdelingsklasse. In 1957 it where promoted into the Vierde Klasse for the first time. In 1994 Someren where promoted to the Eerste Klasse in 1996 it went back into the Tweede Klasse but where promoted back into the Eerste Klasse as unbeaten champions in 2002. From that year it played in the Eerste Klasse D district South II until 2009–2010. In the 2010–2011 season, it played in the Tweede Klasse H and where it were promoted again to the Eerste Klasse. In the following season it was promoted again to the Hoofdklasse after a season, where it finished rock bottom, it returned to the Eerste Klasse. In 2015-2016 it was relegated again back into the Tweede Klasse. It promoted back to the eerste klasse for one season.

== Rivalries ==
SV Someren's rival is NWC Asten. This match is known as the Kanaalderby. Each season also starts with the Ricus Verhees Cup, where the youth teams of SV Someren and NWC Asten compete against each other.

== Women ==
The first women's football team since the 2017/18 season plays in the same team as NWC Women's as ST Someren/NWC. In the first season it played in the Eerste Klasse, since 2018/19 in it has been in the Hoofdklasse Sunday.

Someren reached the First Division for the first time in 2003/04, where it sustained itself for five seasons. After three seasons in the Second Division, the First Division was again reached and after another three seasons the Hoofdklasse from which it was relegated in the third season (2016/17).
