= Vincent van den Berg =

Dutch footballer

Personal information
- Full name: Vincent van den Berg
- Date of birth: 19 January 1989 (age 37)
- Place of birth: Schiedam, Netherlands
- Height: 1.83 m (6 ft 0 in)
- Position: Forward

Team information
- Current team: VFC

Youth career
- –2004: Feyenoord
- 2004–2006: Heerenveen
- 2006–2007: Arsenal

Senior career*
Years	Team	Apps	(Gls)
2007–2009	Arsenal	0	(0)
2007–2008	→ Go Ahead Eagles (loan)	3	(0)
2008–2009	→ FC Zwolle (loan)	0	(0)
2009–2022	Excelsior Maassluis	162	(44)

International career^{‡}
2005	Netherlands U17		
- * Club domestic league appearances and goals as of 4 February 2019 ‡ National team caps and goals as of 12:35, 7 January 2008 (UTC)

Vincent van den Berg (born 19 January 1989) is a Dutch footballer who plays as a forward. He played for Arsenal, Go Ahead Eagles, FC Zwolle and Excelsior Maassluis. (Note: Vincent van den Berg at WorldFootball.net)

== Club career ==
Born in Schiedam, Rotterdam, Van den Berg started off as a youth at Feyenoord's Academy. He went on to play for SC Heerenveen, prior to moving to Arsenal at the age of 17 during the summer of 2006. He played for both Arsenal's Academy and Reserve teams, but only in pre-season friendlies for the first team, most notably as a substitute in Dennis Bergkamp's testimonial match.

On January 7, 2008 Arsenal officially confirmed he would go on loan to Go Ahead Eagles for the second half of the 2007-08 season. He made his debut for Eagles, starting in a friendly match against Samsunspor, during which he was injured and had to be substituted after 25 minutes of play. After recovering, he went on to be capped a total of four times for Go Ahead, without any goals scored altogether.

On 12 August 2008, Van den Berg joined FC Zwolle on loan, for the 2008-09 season, but did not play for the first team, due to injuries.

With his Arsenal contract due to expire in the summer of 2009, he was offered a trial with Sparta Rotterdam, but was again injured. Van den Berg then joined up with Excelsior Maassluis in August 2009. Whilst featuring at and away from the Lavendelstraat, Van Den Berg was victorious in the 2013 Hoofdklasse. He also went on with Excelsior, to win the Derde Divisie title of 2016. With this victory Excelsior earned promotion to the Tweede Divisie.

Van den Berg retired in 2022 but returned to amateur football with VFC in 2025.

== International career ==
Van den Berg played for the Netherlands U17 team, and so was a member of the side that went on to win a bronze medal at the 2005 FIFA U-17 World Cup in Peru.

== Honours ==
=== Club ===
Excelsior Maassluis

- Hoofdklasse: 2013
- Derde Divisie: 2016

=== International ===
Holland

- 2005 FIFA U-17 World Cup: Bronze Medal.
