= 2013–14 Eerste Klasse =

Eerste Klasse
- Season: 2013–14

The 2013–14 Eerste Klasse season was the fourth edition of the Dutch fifth tier since the Topklasse was formed as the third tier in 2010.

A total 84 teams participated in the league. As usual, the competition was divided into eleven divisions: five divisions play on Saturdays and six divisions play on Sundays.

The champion of each division was directly promoted to the 2014–15 Hoofdklasse. Saturday champions were:

- FC Breukelen
- FC Rijnvogels
- VV Spijkenisse
- DFS Opheusden
- SV Urk

Sunday champions were:

- JOS Watergraafsmeer
- Magreb '90
- VC Vlissingen
- TOP Oss
- FC Presikhaaf
- Achilles 1894

== Teams ==
=== Saturday league A (West I) ===
| Club | Location |
|---|---|
| Almkerk | Almkerk |
| ARC | Alphen aan den Rijn |
| ASC Nieuwland | Amersfoort |
| Breukelen | Breukelen |
| CSW | Wilnis |
| De Meern (Saturday) | Utrecht |
| Eemdijk | Bunschoten |
| Leerdam Sport '55 | Leerdam |
| LRC | Leerdam |
| Nivo Sparta | Zaltbommel |
| Roda '46 (Saturday) | Leusden |
| SVL | Langbroek |
| VVZ '49 | Soest |
| Zuidvogels | Huizen |

=== Saturday league B (West II) ===
| Club | Location |
|---|---|
| Aalsmeer | Aalsmeer |
| Alexandria '66 | Rotterdam |
| BVCB | Bergschenhoek |
| DSO | Zoetermeer |
| Forum Sport | Voorburg |
| GHC | Leiden |
| Haaglandia (Saturday) | Rijswijk |
| Nootdorp | Nootdorp |
| RCL | Leiderdrop |
| Rijnvogels | Katwijk |
| Swift | Amsterdam |
| Voorschoten '97 | Voorschoten |
| WV-HEDW | Amsterdam |
| Zwaluwen '30 | Hoorn |

== League tables ==
=== Saturday 'A' league (West I) ===
| Pos | Team | Pld | W | D | L | GF | GA | GD | Pts | Promotion or relegation |
|---|---|---|---|---|---|---|---|---|---|---|
| 1 | Breukelen (C, P) | 26 | 19 | 5 | 2 | 99 | 39 | +60 | 62 | Promotion to Hoofdklasse |
| 2 | LRC | 26 | 20 | 2 | 4 | 62 | 27 | +35 | 62 | |
| 3 | VVZ '49 | 26 | 16 | 4 | 6 | 62 | 49 | +13 | 52 | |
| 4 | ARC | 26 | 16 | 2 | 8 | 61 | 35 | +26 | 50 | |
| 5 | Zuidvogels | 26 | 13 | 3 | 10 | 55 | 51 | +4 | 42 | |
| 6 | SVL | 26 | 12 | 5 | 9 | 67 | 50 | +17 | 41 | |
| 7 | Eemdijk | 26 | 10 | 8 | 8 | 51 | 37 | +14 | 38 | |
| 8 | De Meern | 26 | 8 | 8 | 10 | 40 | 45 | −5 | 32 | |
| 9 | ASC Nieuwland | 26 | 8 | 4 | 14 | 47 | 64 | −17 | 28 | |
| 10 | Roda '46 | 26 | 8 | 2 | 16 | 28 | 60 | −32 | 26 | |
| 11 | Almkerk | 26 | 5 | 7 | 14 | 35 | 63 | −28 | 22 | Qualification for relegation play-offs |
| 12 | Nivo Sparta | 26 | 6 | 3 | 17 | 42 | 63 | −21 | 21 | Qualification for relegation play-offs |
| 13 | CSW | 26 | 4 | 9 | 13 | 35 | 59 | −24 | 21 | Relegation to 2014–15 Tweede Klasse |
| 14 | Leerdam Sport '55 | 26 | 6 | 0 | 20 | 31 | 73 | −42 | 18 | Relegation to 2014–15 Tweede Klasse |

Updated to match(es) played on 12 May 2013. Source: Eerste Klasse Zaterdag A
Rules for classification: 1) points; 2) goal difference; 3) number of goals scored.
(C) Champions; (P) Promoted
