= NWC (football club) =

Association football club in Someren, Netherlands

NWC Asten
- Full name: Rooms Katholieke Voetbalvereniging Noad Wilhelmina Combinatie
- Founded: May 19, 1928; 97 years ago
- Ground: Sportpark 't Root
- Manager: Mario Verlijsdonk
- League: Tweede Klasse Sunday (Men's) (2021/22) Hoofdklasse Sunday (Women's) (2021/22)
- Website: https://www.nwc-asten.nl/
Home colours

NWC Asten (abbreviation for Noad Wilhelmina Combinatie) is an association football club from Asten, Netherlands. Its home games are played at Sportpark 't Root. NWC's first squad plays in the 2021–22 season in the Tweede Klasse Sunday South II.

== History ==
=== 20th century ===
The club was founded on 19 May 1928. It originally played at 'De Bosplak'.

In 1940, NWC joined the Vierde Klasse of the NVB. Until 2005, NWC Asten mostly hovered between the Vierde and Derde Klasse. Exceptions were: 1944–45, when there was no competition; 1957–64, 1974–88, and 1989–90, when it played outside the national league system; and 2002–03, when it played in the Vijfde Klasse.

The first section championship NWC won was in 1943 in the Vierde Klasse. No promotion followed.

NWC's second grounds were 'De Hoge Akker', on the Voordeldonk in Asten. Eventually it moved to 'Sportpark 't Root' on the Beatrixlaan.

=== 21st century ===
In November 2009, the municipality council of Asten made money available for the renewal of the sports park, as it did not meet the requirements of our time. A new clubhouse was completed in September 2014. The new accommodation contains more changing rooms, a canteen and care and meeting rooms. The building is located on the long side of the main field, opposite the grandstand. The old clubhouse was demolished after completion of the new club facilities.

In 2014, NWC was defeated 8–0 in a friendly game against Inter Baku from Azerbaijan, played in Antalya, Turkey.

Since 2017, NWC fields a joined the women's first squad with SV Someren, under the name ST Someren/NWC. In the first season, it played in the Women's Eerste Klasse. Since 2018 it has been in the Hoofdklasse Sunday.

Since 2018, Asten has artificial turf.

In 2021, NWC Asten coped with the COVID-19 pandemic in the Netherlands by allowing free entrance to first squad games while locating game sponsors to cover the costs.

== Major games ==
=== National KNVB Cup ===
29 August 2020	(Netherlands) Achilles Veen	5 – 0 (3 – 0)	(Netherlands) NWC Asten	Veen, Netherlands
18:00	T. de Man 9'; T. Schilders 36'; B. Westerlaken 43'; R. Koenen]] 59'; N. Wilborts 65'			Stadium: Sportpark De Hanen Weide; Attendance: 435; Referee: B. Huizinga

=== International friendlies ===
11 January 2014	(Azerbaijan) Inter Baku	8 – 0 (5 – 0)	(Netherlands) NWC Asten	Antalya, Turkey
AZT (UTC+4)	Tskhadadze; Špičić; Álvaro; I. Alakbarov; N. Mənsimzadə	Summary

== Rivalries ==
NWC's rival is SV Someren. This match is known as the Kanaalderby. Each season starts with the Ricus Verhees Cup, where youth teams of NWC Asten and SV Someren compete against each other.

== Chief coach ==
- Ruud Vermeer, 2019–2021
- Thomas Zegers, interim 2021
- Mario Verlijsdonk, 2021–
