= Heinenoord =

- Village and former municipality
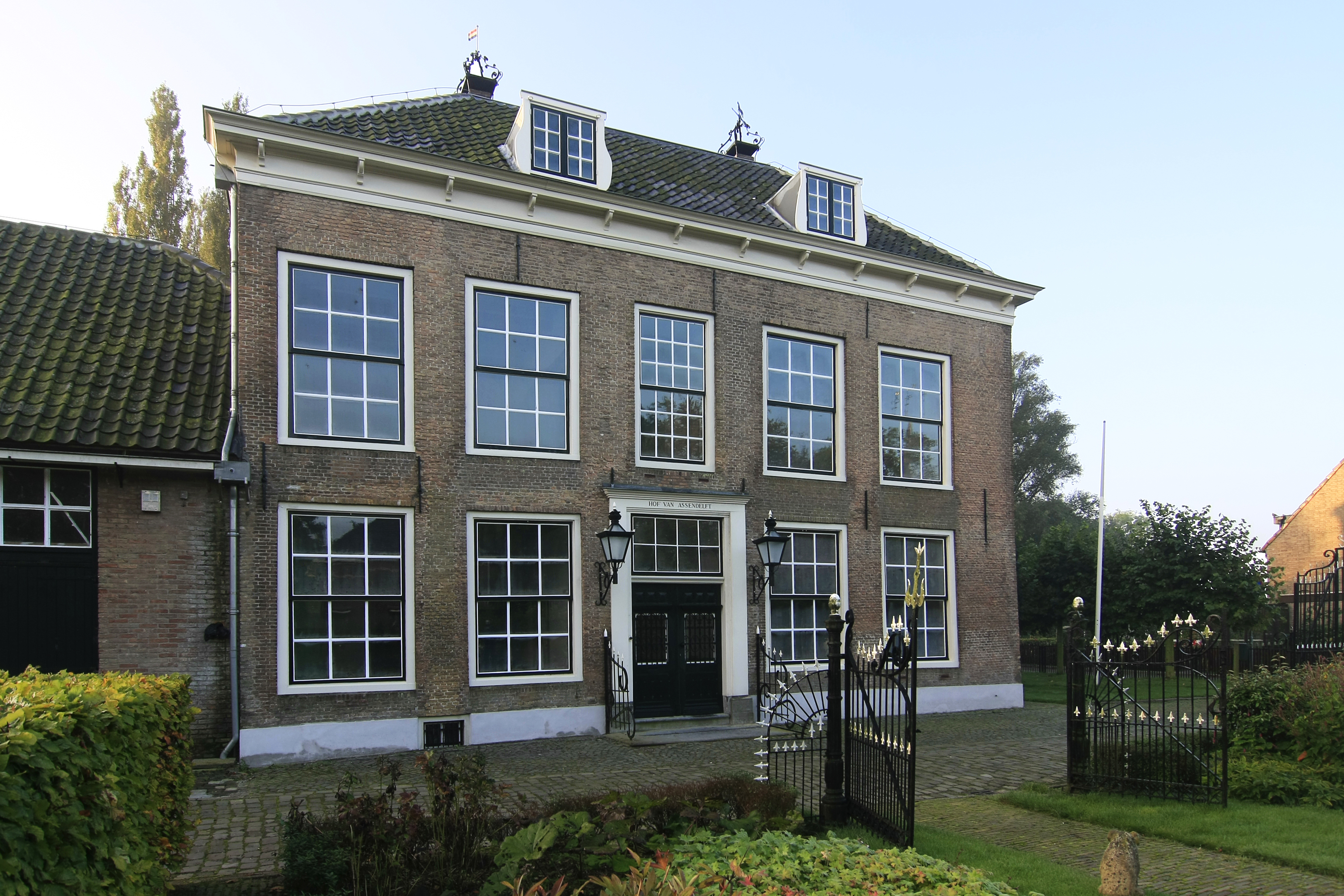
- Local museum

- Flag Coat of arms

- Location in the province of South Holland in the Netherlands Location in the Netherlands
- Coordinates: 51°50′N 4°29′E
- Country: Netherlands
- Province: South Holland
- Municipality: Hoeksche Waard

Area
  - Total: 16.19 km^{2} (6.25 sq mi)
- Elevation: 0.0 m (0 ft)

Population (2021)
  - Total: 3,615
  - Density: 223.3/km^{2} (578.3/sq mi)
- Time zone: UTC+1 (CET)
  - Summer (DST): UTC+2 (CEST)
- Postal code: 3274
- Dialing code: 0186

Heinenoord is a village in the Dutch province of South Holland on the island Hoekse Waard. It is located about 10 km south of Rotterdam, in the municipality of Hoeksche Waard.

Heinenoord was a separate municipality until 1984, when it became part of Binnenmaas. Since 1 January 2019, it is part of the new municipality Hoeksche Waard. After 1855, the municipality also covered the village of Goidschalxoord.

The Heinenoordtunnel is a road tunnel located near Heinenoord and is named after it.

There is also a bus station near Heinenoord called the Busstation Heinenoord which serves as a public transport hub in the Hoekse Waard.

== Situation ==
Heinenoord is a village located on the island Hoeksche Waard in the province of South Holland. It is a Linear settlement, built on a dike. The neighbouring village Goidschalxoord, which is also a linear settlement, is a township of Heinenoord. Kuipersveer and Blaaksedijk are also townships of Heinenoord.

Since 14 November 1968, the Hoeksche Waard is connected with Barendrecht on the island of IJsselmonde through the Heinenoordtunnel.

== History ==
The village was first mentioned in 1312 as "tot Heynekens orde", and means "land (near water) belonging to Heineken (person - diminutive of Hein)".

In the Middle Ages, Heinenoord and its surroundings were known as "het Land van Wale". After the St. Elizabeth's flood (1421), Heinenoord was engulfed by the water. It recovered around 1437, when the land was reclaimed. Around that time the village of Heynkensort was founded. Together with Goidschalxoord and the townships Kuipersveer and Blaaksedijk it formed one municipality from 1855 until 1984.

On 17 February 1945, an angry mob shot the NSB-mayor M.A. Simonis from Nieuw-Beijerland on Heinenoord territory. The next day ten Dutchmen were executed by a German firing squad as reprisal, who were imprisoned in Scheveningen. On the same place in 1950, the monument moeder, Dutch for "mother", was unveiled.

== Notable people ==
- Esmee Brugts (born 2003), footballer for the Netherlands national team

== Gallery ==
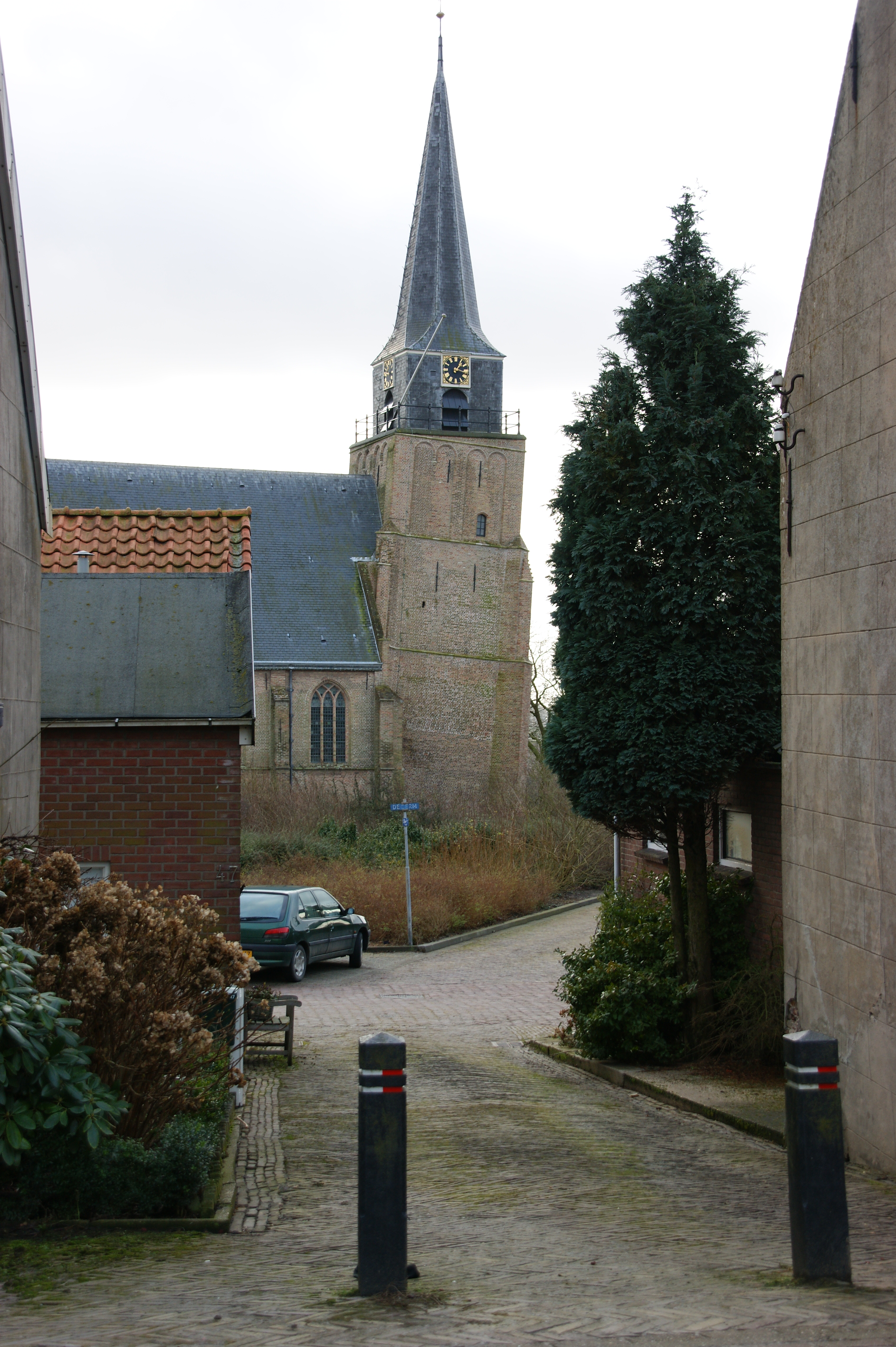
Dutch Reformed church

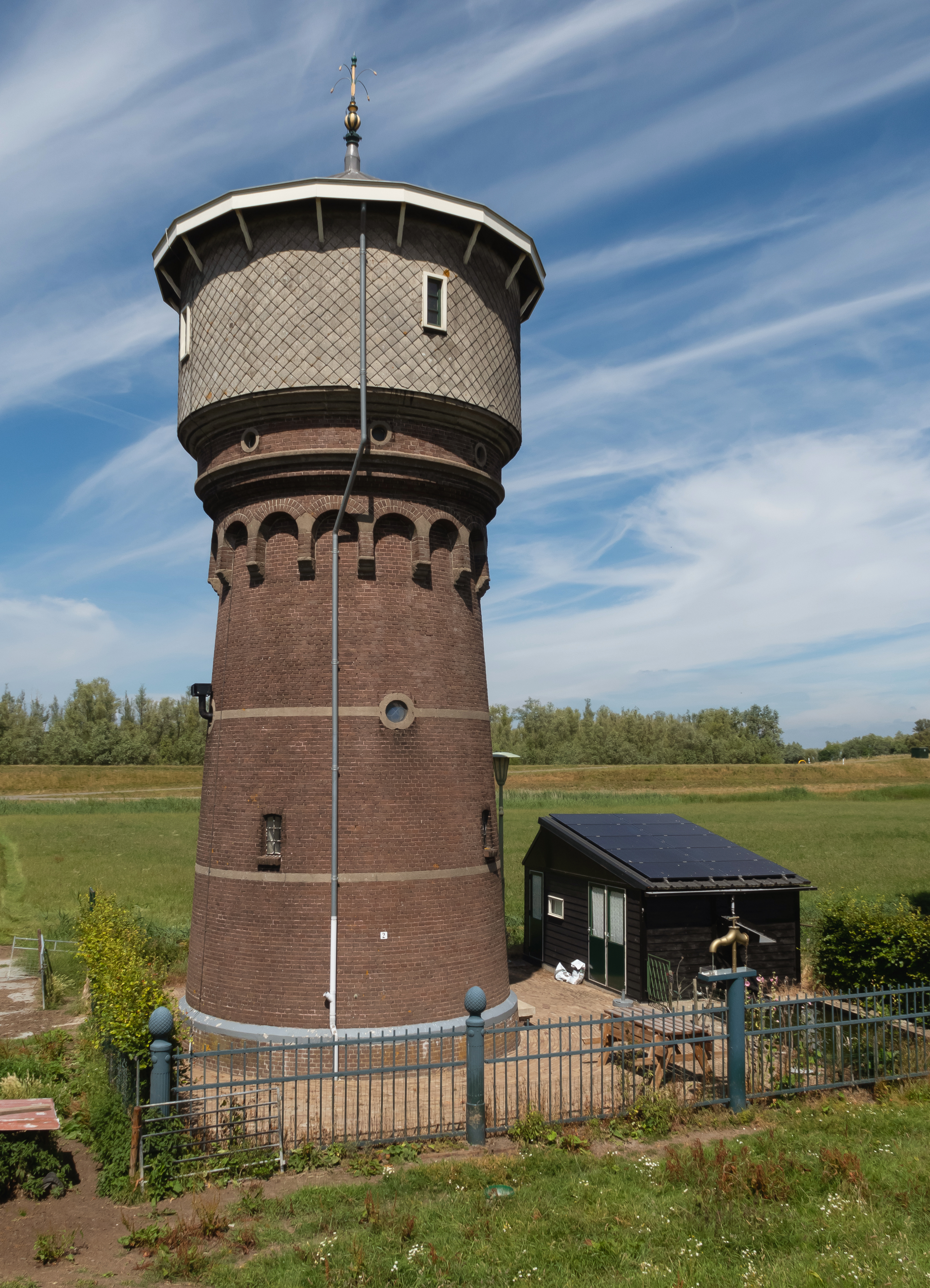
Watertower

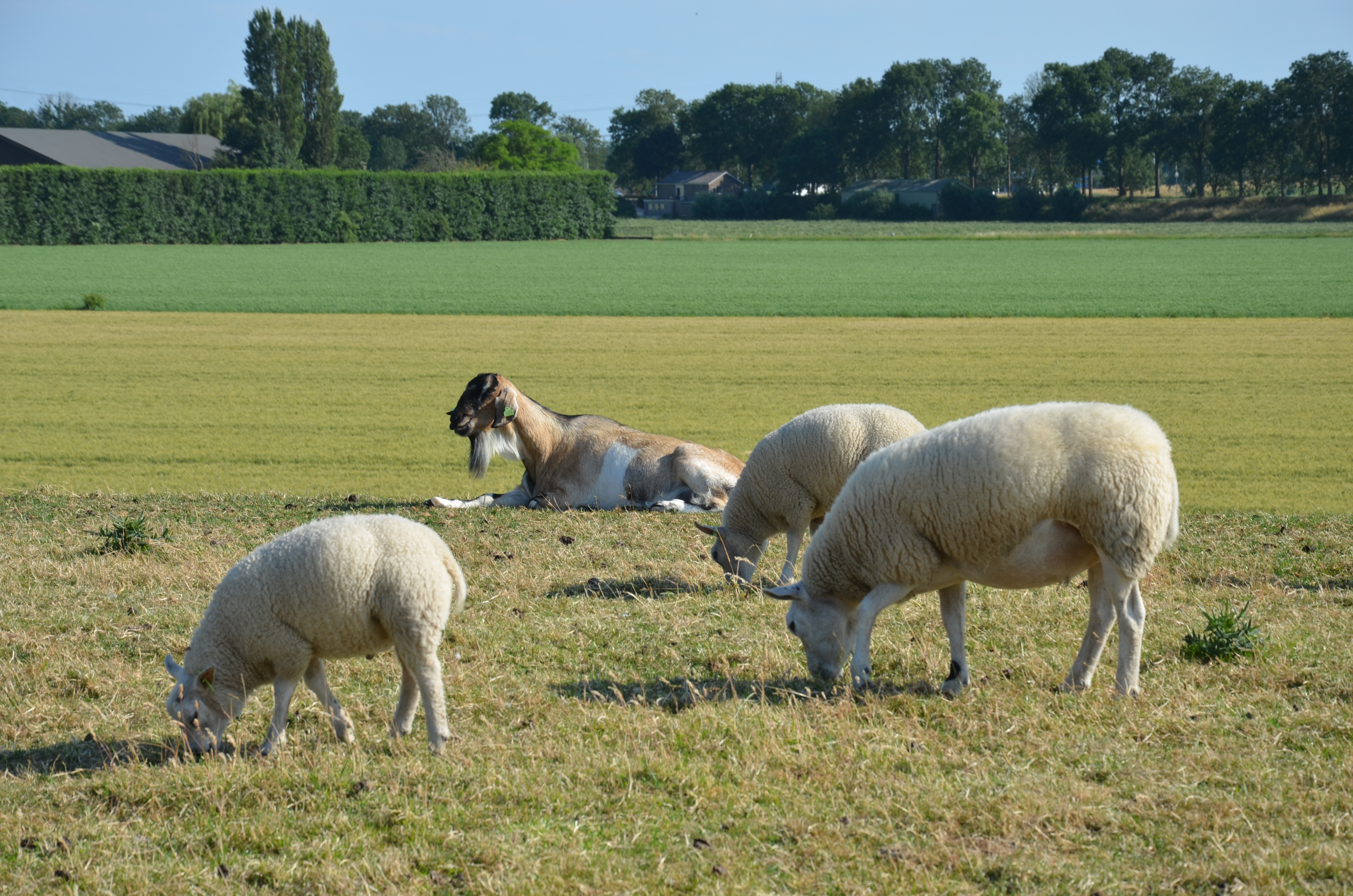
Sheep and a goat near Heinenoord

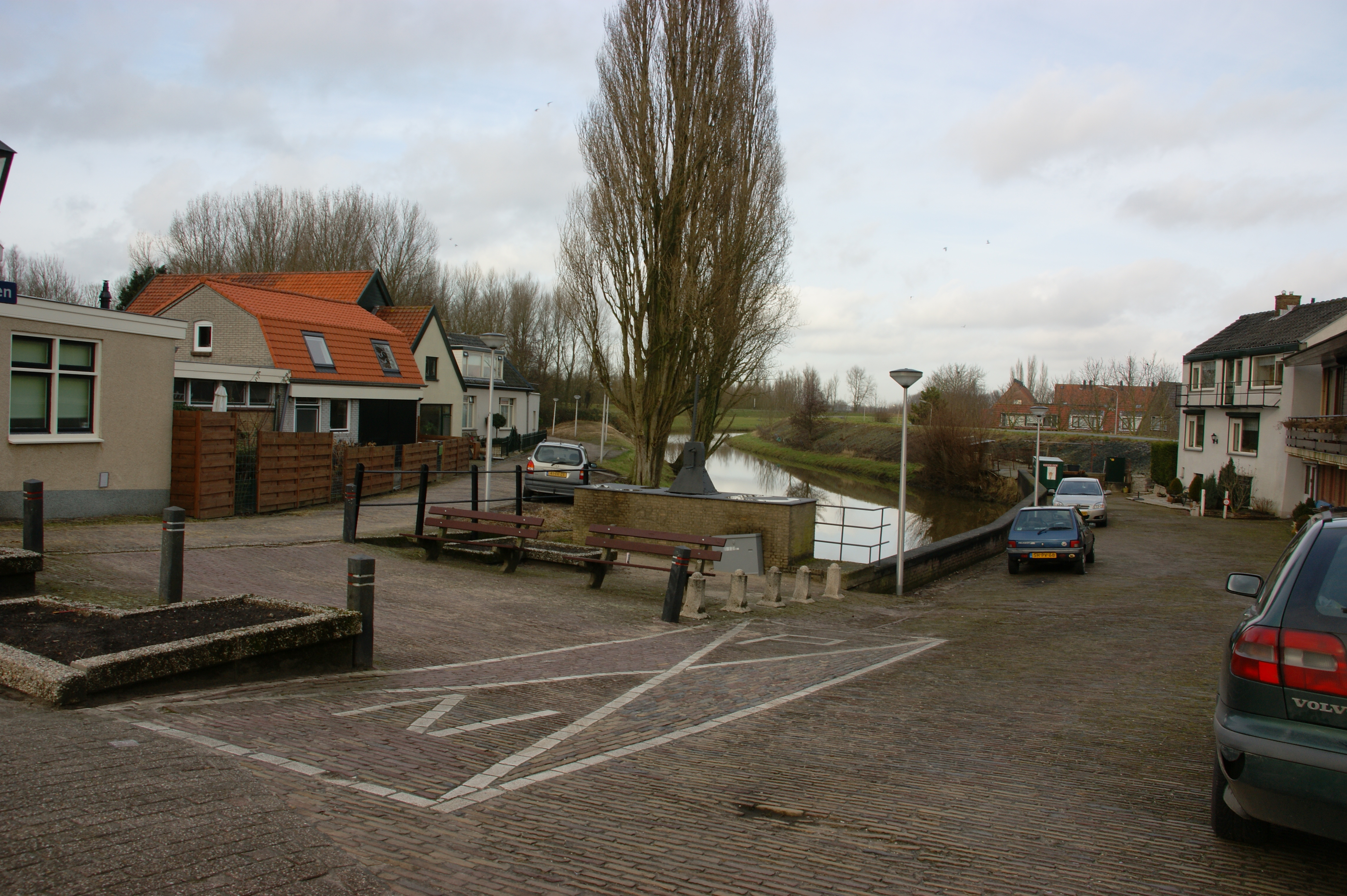
Old harbour

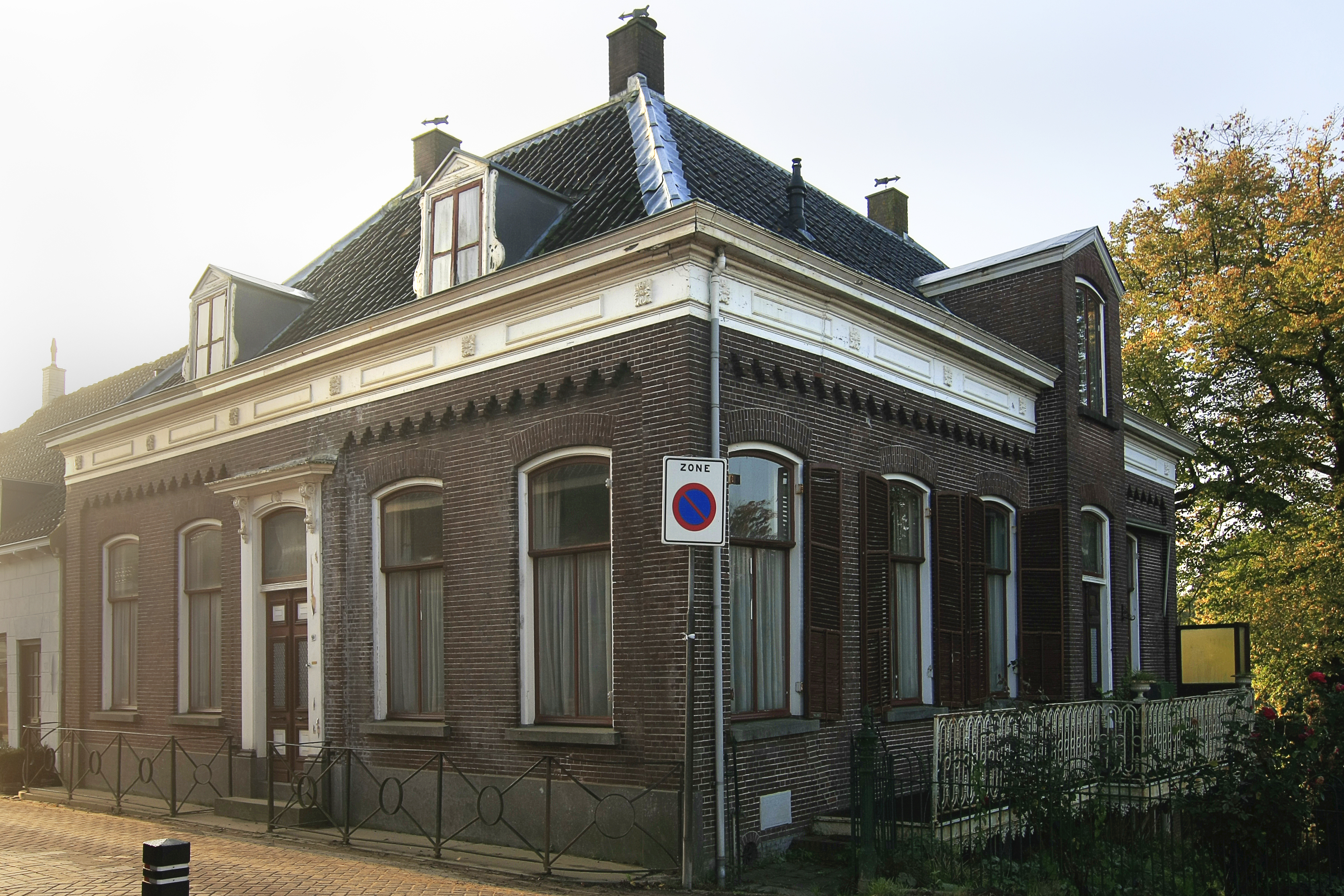
House in Heinenoord
