= 2008–09 Scunthorpe United F.C. season =

Scunthorpe United F.C.
2008–2009 season
- Chairman: Steve Wharton
- Manager: Nigel Adkins
- Stadium: Glanford Park
- League One: 6th (promoted)
- FA Cup: Third round
- League Cup: First Round
- League Trophy: Final
Home colours	Away colours	Third colours

During the 2008–09 English football season, Scunthorpe United F.C. competed in League One, the third tier of English football. Scunthorpe also competed in the FA Cup, Football League Cup and Football League Trophy.

== Season summary ==
The 2008–09 season saw Scunthorpe reach Wembley twice. The Iron qualified for the Football League Trophy final, but were beaten 3–2 after extra time by Luton Town. The club then qualified for the League One play-offs through an 88th-minute equaliser by club captain Cliff Byrne against promotion rivals Tranmere Rovers on the last day of the regular season. Scunthorpe beat MK Dons on penalties after a 1–1 aggregate draw in the semi-finals, before beating Millwall in the Wembley final 3–2, with two goals from Matt Sparrow and one from Martyn Woolford, to achieve promotion back to the Championship at the first time of asking.

== Squad ==
No.	Name	Nat	Position	Date of birth	Place of birth	note
1	Joe Murphy	(Republic of Ireland)	GK	25 September 1980	Dublin	
2	Kenny Milne	(Scotland)	DF	26 August 1979	Alloa	
3	Marcus Williams	(England)	DF	8 April 1986	Doncaster	
4	Andy Crosby	(England)	DF	3 March 1973	Rotherham	
5	Izzy Iriekpen	(England)	DF	14 May 1982	Newham	signed for Bristol City
5	Joseph Mills	(England)	DF	30 October 1989	Swindon	on loan from Southampton
6	Cliff Byrne	(Republic of Ireland)	DF	27 April 1982	Dublin	captain
7	Matt Sparrow	(England)	MF	3 October 1983	Scunthorpe	
8	Garry Thompson	(England)	MF	24 November 1980	Kendal	
9	Paul Hayes	(England)	FW	20 September 1983	Dagenham	
10	Gary Hooper	(England)	FW	26 January 1988	Harlow	
11	Ian Baraclough	(England)	MF	4 December 1970	Leicester	
14	Michael Lea	(England)	DF	4 November 1987	Salford	
15	David Mirfin	(England)	DF	18 April 1985	Sheffield	
16	Martyn Woolford	(England)	MF	13 October 1985	Pontefract	
17	Grant McCann	(Northern Ireland)	MF	14 April 1980	Belfast	
18	Sam Togwell	(England)	MF	14 October 1984	Maidenhead	
19	Jonathan Forte	(Barbados)	FW	25 July 1986	Sheffield	
20	Sam Slocombe	(England)	GK	5 June 1988	Scunthorpe	
21	Jake Picton	(England)	DF	6 January 1991	Pontefract	
22	Josh Lillis	(England)	GK	24 June 1987	Derby	
23	Kevan Hurst	(England)	FW	27 August 1985	Chesterfield	
24	Andrew Wright	(England)	MF	15 January 1985	Liverpool	
25	Peter Winn	(England)	FW	19 December 1988	Cleethorpes	
26	Krystian Pearce	(England)	DF	5 January 1990	Birmingham	on loan from Birmingham City
27	Ian Morris	(Republic of Ireland)	MF	27 February 1987	Dublin	
28	Rory Coleman	(England)	DF	22 December 1990	Rotherham	
29	Joe Wilcox	(England)	DF	18 April 1989	Northampton	
30	Ben May	(England)	FW	10 March 1984	Gravesend	
31	Henri Lansbury	(England)	MF	12 October 1990	Enfield	on loan from Arsenal
32	Liam Trotter	(England)	MF	24 August 1988	Ipswich	on loan from Ipswich Town
33	Kayode Odejayi	(Nigeria)	FW	21 February 1982	Ibadan	on loan from Barnsley
40	Kevin Pressman	(England)	GK	6 November 1967	Fareham	

== Competitions ==
=== Football League One ===
==== League table ====
Pos	Team	Pld	W	D	L	GF	GA	GD	Pts	Promotion or relegation
4	Leeds United	46	26	6	14	77	49	+28	84	Qualification for League One play-offs
5	Millwall	46	25	7	14	63	53	+10	82	Qualification for League One play-offs
6	Scunthorpe United (O, P)	46	22	10	14	82	63	+19	76	Qualification for League One play-offs
7	Tranmere Rovers	46	21	11	14	62	49	+13	74	
8	Southend United	46	21	8	17	58	61	−3	71	

Updated to match(es) played on 2 May 2009. Source: The Football League
Rules for classification: 1) points; 2) goal difference; 3) number of goals scored.
(O) Play-off winners; (P) Promoted

==== Matches ====
9 August 2008 1	Scunthorpe United	1–2	Leeds United	Glanford Park
12:00	Hooper 57'		Showunmi 61'; Beckford 80'	Attendance: 8,315

16 August 2008 2	Walsall	2–1	Scunthorpe United	Bescot Stadium
15:00	Reich 12'; Ibehre 89'		Thompson 2'	Attendance: 4,162

23 August 2008 3	Scunthorpe United	1–0	Peterborough United	Glanford Park
15:00	Hayes 44'			Attendance: 4,717

30 August 2008 4	Stockport County	0–3	Scunthorpe United	Edgeley Park
15:00			Hooper 30', 47'; McCann 58'	Attendance: 6,348

6 September 2008 5	Brighton and Hove Albion	1–4	Scunthorpe United	Withdean Stadium
15:00	Robinson 75'		Woolford 4'; Hooper 45+3', 55', 68'	Attendance: 5,529

13 September 2008 6	Scunthorpe United	2–1	Carlisle United	Glanford Park
15:00	Sparrow 62'; Hayes 73'		Carlton 77'	Attendance: 5,188

20 September 2008 7	Hereford United	1–2	Scunthorpe United	Edgar Street
15:00	Chadwick 25'		Togwell 53'; Hooper 58'	Attendance: 3,004

27 September 2008 8	Scunthorpe United	2–0	Yeovil Town	Glanford Park
15:00	Iriekpen 27'; Forbes 63' (o.g.)			Attendance: 4,829

4 October 2008 9	Leyton Orient	2–2	Scunthorpe United	Brisbane Road
15:00	Boyd 59'; Purches 67'		Iriekpen 26'; Hayes 45+1'	Attendance: 4,244

11 October 2008 10	Scunthorpe United	3–0	Crewe Alexandra	Glanford Park
15:00	Woolford 35'; Hayes 67'; Iriekpen 80'			Attendance: 4,790

18 October 2008 11	Cheltenham Town	1–2	Scunthorpe United	Whaddon Road
15:00	Connor 69'		Hooper 34'; Sparrow 90'	Attendance: 3,682

21 October 2008 12	Scunthorpe United	1–1	Southend United	Glanford Park
19:30	Hayes 79'		Barrett 47'	Attendance: 4,324

25 October 2008 13	Scunthorpe United	3–2	Millwall	Glanford Park
15:00	Hooper 5'; Hayes 16'; Sparrow 51'		Neil Harris 62'; Craig 69'	Attendance: 5,670

==== Play-offs ====
8 May 2009 Semi-final first leg	Scunthorpe United	1–1	Milton Keynes Dons	Scunthorpe
19:45 BST	Woolford 13'	Report	Wilbraham 27'	Stadium: Glanford Park; Attendance: 6,599; Referee: Scott Mathieson

15 May 2009 Semi-final second leg	Milton Keynes Dons	0–0 (a.e.t.) (1–1 agg.) (6–7 p)	Scunthorpe United	Denbigh, Milton Keynes
19:45 BST		Report		Stadium: Stadium MK; Attendance: 14,479; Referee: Neil Swarbrick
	Penalties
	Leven (penalty scored); Wilbraham (penalty scored); Navarro (penalty scored); Puncheon (penalty missed); Llera (penalty scored); Stirling (penalty missed); Lewington (penalty scored); Guéret (penalty scored); Flo (penalty missed)		(penalty scored) McCann; (penalty scored) Hayes; (penalty scored) Crosby; (penalty missed) Byrne; (penalty scored) Trotter; (penalty missed) Sparrow; (penalty scored) Forte; (penalty scored) Togwell; (penalty scored) Morris

24 May 2009 final	Millwall	2–3	Scunthorpe United	London
13:00 BST	Alexander 37', 39'	Report	Sparrow 6', 70'; Woolford 85'	Stadium: Wembley Stadium; Attendance: 59,661; Referee: Michael Oliver

=== FA Cup ===
8 November 2008 First round	Walsall	1–3	Scunthorpe United	Bescot, Walsall
15:00 GMT	Ricketts 25'; Demontagnac (red card) 79'	Report	Hooper 42', 58'; Hurst 90'	Stadium: Bescot Stadium; Attendance: 2,318; Referee: Roger East

29 November 2008 Second round	Scunthorpe United	4–0	Alfreton Town	Scunthorpe
15:00 GMT	May 30'; Hooper 62', 83'; Togwell 90'	Report	Clayton (red card) 48'	Stadium: Glanford Park; Attendance: 4,249; Referee: Chris Sarginson

3 January 2009 Third round	Watford	1–0	Scunthorpe United	Watford
15:00 GMT	Rasiak 67'	Report		Stadium: Vicarage Road; Attendance: 8,690; Referee: Kevin Wright

=== Football League Cup ===
12 August 2008 First round	Hartlepool United	3–0	Scunthorpe United	Hartlepool
19:45 BST	Porter 50'; Foley 58'; Brown 75'	Report		Stadium: Victoria Park; Attendance: 2,076; Referee: Neil Swarbrick

=== Football League Trophy ===
2 September 2008 First round	Scunthorpe United	2–1	Notts County	Scunthorpe
19:30 BST	Hayes 90', 90'	Report	Butcher 9'	Stadium: Glanford Park; Attendance: 1,755; Referee: Andy Haines

7 October 2008 Second round	Scunthorpe United	2–1	Grimsby Town	Scunthorpe
19:30 BST	Togwell 38'; Morris 42'	Report	Hegarty 48'	Stadium: Glanford Park; Attendance: 4,844; Referee: Kevin Friend

4 November 2008 Area quarter-final	Scunthorpe United	1–0	Rochdale	Scunthorpe
19:30 GMT	Mirfin 90'	Report		Stadium: Glanford Park; Attendance: 2,474; Referee: Jonathan Moss

16 December 2008 Area semi-final	Scunthorpe United	2–1	Tranmere Rovers	Scunthorpe
19:45 GMT	May 26'; Hayes 90'	Report	Thomas-Moore 53'	Stadium: Glanford Park; Attendance: 2,669; Referee: Michael Oliver

20 January 2009 Area final first leg	Scunthorpe United	2–0	Rotherham United	Scunthorpe
19:30 GMT	Woolford 60'; Pearce 67'	Report		Stadium: Glanford Park; Attendance: 6,038; Referee: Clive Oliver

17 February 2009 Area final second leg	Rotherham United	0–1	Scunthorpe United	Sheffield
19:45 GMT			Hooper 74'	Stadium: Don Valley Stadium; Attendance: 6,555; Referee: Kevin Friend

5 April 2009 Final	Luton Town	3–2 (a.e.t.)	Scunthorpe United	Wembley, London
13:15 BST	Martin 32'; Craddock 70'; Gnakpa 95'	Report	Hooper 14'; McCann 88'	Stadium: Wembley Stadium; Attendance: 55,378; Referee: Phil Crossley
