= 2010–11 Scunthorpe United F.C. season =

Scunthorpe United
2010–11 season
- Chairman: J. Steven Wharton
- Manager: Alan Knill
- Stadium: Glanford Park
- Football League Championship: 24th (relegated)
- FA Cup: Third round
- Football League Cup: Third round
- Top goalscorer: League: Michael O'Connor (8); All: Michael O'Connor (9)
- Highest home attendance: 9,077 vs. Manchester United (22 Sep 2010)
- Lowest home attendance: 2,602 vs. Oldham Athletic (10 Aug 2010)
Home colours	Away colours

== Season Review ==
=== Events ===
In Scunthorpe's second consecutive season in the Championship, they didn't have the same success as the previous season, ending the season 24th and being relegated to League One. After a good start to the season, manager Nigel Adkins jumped ship to join League One side Southampton and it all went downhill from there. Despite Ian Baraclough being appointed as manager, they continued to slide down the table, and were in the relegation zone by Christmas. In March Ian Baraclough was sacked after failing to take Scunthorpe out of the bottom 3 and Tony Daws took over as caretaker manager, but it wasn't enough to keep the club in the second tier.

- 13 September 2010 – Nigel Adkins leaves Scunthorpe United to join Football League One side Southampton.
- 24 September 2010 – Ian Baraclough is appointed as manager.
- 5 October 2010 – Steve Parkin is appointed as First-Team Coach.
- 16 March 2011 – Ian Baraclough is sacked as manager and Tony Daws is appointed caretaker manager.
- 31 March 2011 – Scunthorpe United appoint Alan Knill as manager.

=== Football League Championship ===
==== Standings ====
Pos	Team	Pld	W	D	L	GF	GA	GD	Pts	Promotion, qualification or relegation
20	Crystal Palace	46	12	12	22	44	69	−25	48	
21	Doncaster Rovers	46	11	15	20	55	81	−26	48	
22	Preston North End (R)	46	10	12	24	54	79	−25	42	Relegation to Football League One
23	Sheffield United (R)	46	11	9	26	44	79	−35	42	Relegation to Football League One
24	Scunthorpe United (R)	46	12	6	28	43	87	−44	42	Relegation to Football League One

Updated to match(es) played on 7 May 2011. Source: The Football League
Rules for classification: 1) points; 2) goal difference; 3) number of goals scored.
(R) Relegated

==== Results summary ====
Overall								Home						Away					
Pld	W	D	L	GF	GA	GD	Pts	W	D	L	GF	GA	GD	W	D	L	GF	GA	GD
46	12	6	28	43	87	−44	42	5	5	13	21	40	−19	7	1	15	22	47	−25

Last updated: 7 May 2011.

==== Result round by round ====
Round	1	2	3	4	5	6	7	8	9	10	11	12	13	14	15	16	17	18	19	20	21	22	23	24	25	26	27	28	29	30	31	32	33	34	35	36	37	38	39	40	41	42	43	44	45	46
Ground	A	H	A	H	H	A	A	H	H	A	H	A	A	H	A	H	H	A	H	A	H	A	H	A	H	A	H	A	H	H	H	A	A	H	A	H	H	A	A	H	H	A	A	H	A	H
Result	W	L	L	W	L	W	L	D	D	L	L	W	W	L	W	L	W	L	L	L	W	L	L	L	D	L	L	L	W	D	W	L	L	W	L	L	L	L	L	W	L	W	D	L	L	D
Position	10	13	16	11	15	10	16	16	16	17	19	18	15	16	15	16	18	20	21	21	22	22	23	23	23	23	23	23	23	23	22	22	22	22	22	22	22	23	24	22	22	22	22	23	23	24

Updated to match(es) played on 7 May 2011. Source:
A = Away; H = Home; W = Win; D = Draw; L = Loss

== Squad ==
Note: Flags indicate national team as defined under FIFA eligibility rules; some limited exceptions apply. Players may hold more than one non-FIFA nationality.

No.	Pos.	Nation	Player
1	GK	(Republic of Ireland) IRL	Joe Murphy
2	MF	(England) ENG	Andrew Wright
3	DF	(England) ENG	Ben Gordon (on loan from Chelsea)
4	MF	(England) ENG	Sam Togwell
5	DF	(England) ENG	Rob Jones (on loan to Sheffield Wednesday)
6	DF	(Republic of Ireland) IRL	Cliff Byrne (captain)
7	MF	(Honduras) HON	Ramón Núñez (on loan from Leeds United)
8	MF	(Northern Ireland) NIR	Michael O'Connor
9	FW	(England) ENG	Chris Dagnall
10	MF	(England) ENG	Andy Hughes
11	MF	(England) ENG	Garry Thompson
12	DF	(England) ENG	Michael Raynes
13	GK	(England) ENG	Sam Slocombe
14	DF	(England) ENG	Michael Nelson
15	DF	(England) ENG	David Mirfin
16	MF	(England) ENG	Josh Wright
17	FW	(England) ENG	Bobby Grant

No.	Pos.	Nation	Player
18	MF	(Republic of Ireland) IRL	Michael Collins
19	FW	(Scotland) SCO	Lee Miller (on loan from Middlesbrough)
21	DF	(Republic of Ireland) IRL	Eddie Nolan
22	GK	(England) ENG	Josh Lillis
23	DF	(England) ENG	Rory Coleman
24	FW	(England) ENG	Matt Godden
25	DF	(England) ENG	Niall Canavan (on loan to Shrewsbury Town)
26	DF	(England) ENG	Johnathan Williams
27	MF	(Republic of Ireland) IRL	Ian Morris (on loan to Chesterfield)
28	DF	(England) ENG	Paul Reid
29	DF	(England) ENG	Ashley Palmer
30	GK	(England) ENG	Jake Turner
31	MF	(England) ENG	Mark Duffy
32	FW	(England) ENG	Paris Cowan-Hall (on loan to Rushden & Diamonds)
33	FW	(England) ENG	Joe Garner (on loan from Nottingham Forest)
39	DF	(England) ENG	Earl Bell
—	DF	(England) ENG	Marcus Williams (on loan from Reading)

=== Statistics ===
As of 7 May 2011

No.	Pos	Nat	Player	Total		Championship		FA Cup		League Cup	
No.	Pos	Nat	Player	Apps	Goals	Apps	Goals	Apps	Goals	Apps	Goals
1	GK	(Republic of Ireland) IRL	Joe Murphy	32	0	29	0	1	0	2	0
2	DF	(England) ENG	Andrew Wright	22	0	16+4	0	1	0	0+1	0
3	DF	(England) ENG	Ben Gordon	14	0	13+1	0	0	0	0	0
4	MF	(England) ENG	Sam Togwell	40	0	34+2	0	0+1	0	2+1	0
5	DF	(England) ENG	Rob Jones	16	1	13+1	1	1	0	1	0
6	DF	(Republic of Ireland) IRL	Cliff Byrne	24	2	20+1	2	0	0	3	0
7	MF	(Honduras) HON	Ramón Núñez	8	3	8	3	0	0	0	0
8	MF	(Northern Ireland) NIR	Michael O'Connor	36	9	25+7	8	1	0	3	1
9	FW	(England) ENG	Chris Dagnall	41	7	31+6	5	1	0	3	2
10	MF	(England) ENG	Andy Hughes	19	0	18+1	0	0	0	0	0
11	MF	(England) ENG	Garry Thompson	13	1	4+8	1	0	0	1	0
12	DF	(England) ENG	Michael Raynes	25	0	15+7	0	0+1	0	2	0
13	GK	(England) ENG	Sam Slocombe	3	0	0+2	0	0	0	1	0
14	DF	(England) ENG	Michael Nelson	20	0	20	0	0	0	0	0
15	MF	(England) ENG	David Mirfin	25	3	23	3	1	0	1	0
16	MF	(England) ENG	Josh Wright	40	1	31+5	0	1	0	3	1
17	FW	(England) ENG	Bobby Grant	30	0	7+20	0	0	0	0+3	0
18	MF	(Republic of Ireland) IRL	Michael Collins	36	3	19+13	1	1	1	1+2	1
19	FW	(Scotland) SCO	Lee Miller	18	1	12+6	1	0	0	0	0
20	DF	(Republic of Ireland) IRL	Marcus Williams	5	0	5	0	0	0	0	0
21	DF	(Republic of Ireland) IRL	Eddie Nolan	38	0	32+3	0	1	0	2	0
22	GK	(England) ENG	Josh Lillis	15	0	15	0	0	0	0	0
23	DF	(England) ENG	Rory Coleman	0	0	0	0	0	0	0	0
24	FW	(England) ENG	Matt Godden	7	0	0+5	0	0+1	0	0+1	0
25	DF	(England) ENG	Niall Canavan	10	0	6+2	0	0	0	2	0
26	DF	(England) ENG	Jonathan Williams	0	0	0	0	0	0	0	0
27	MF	(Republic of Ireland) IRL	Ian Morris	0	0	0	0	0	0	0	0
28	DF	(England) ENG	Paul Reid	12	0	12	0	0	0	0	0
29	DF	(England) ENG	Ashley Palmer	0	0	0	0	0	0	0	0
30	GK	(England) ENG	Jake Turner	0	0	0	0	0	0	0	0
31	MF	(England) ENG	Mark Duffy	22	0	19+3	0	0	0	0	0
32	FW	(England) ENG	Paris Cowan-Hall	1	0	0+1	0	0	0	0	0
33	FW	(England) ENG	Joe Garner	18	6	17+1	6	0	0	0	0
39	DF	(England) ENG	Earl Bell	0	0	0	0	0	0	0	0
	FW	(England) ENG	Adam Boyes*	1	0	0	0	0	0	0+1	0
	FW	(Barbados) BRB	Jonathan Forte*	28	4	18+6	3	1	0	3	1
	MF	(Norway) NOR	Abdisalam Ibrahim*	11	0	4+7	0	0	0	0	0
	DF	(Australia) AUS	Trent McClenahan*	1	0	0+1	0	0	0	0	0
	MF	(Scotland) SCO	Kevin McDonald*	5	1	3+2	1	0	0	0	0
	DF	(England) ENG	Jimmy McNulty*	7	0	5+1	0	0	0	1	0
	MF	(France) FRA	Dany N'Guessan*	3	1	3	1	0	0	0	0
	FW	(England) ENG	Freddie Sears*	9	0	9	0	0	0	0	0
	GK	(Trinidad and Tobago) TRI	Tony Warner*	2	0	2	0	0	0	0	0
	MF	(England) ENG	Martyn Woolford*	27	8	18+6	6	1	0	2	2

==== Disciplinary record ====
N	P	Name	Championship		FA Cup		League Cup	
N	P	Name	Booked	Sent off (straight red)	Booked	Sent off (straight red)	Booked	Sent off (straight red)
1	GK	Joe Murphy	3	0	0	0	0	0
2	DF	Andrew Wright	3	0	0	0	0	0
3	DF	Ben Gordon	1	0	0	0	0	0
4	MF	Sam Togwell	0	0	0	0	0	1
5	DF	Rob Jones	2	0	0	0	0	0
6	DF	Cliff Byrne	4	0	0	0	1	0
7	MF	Ramón Núñez	1	0	0	0	0	0
8	MF	Michael O'Connor	6	0	0	0	0	0
9	FW	Chris Dagnall	1	0	0	0	1	0
10	MF	Andy Hughes	2	0	0	0	0	0
11	MF	Garry Thompson	1	0	0	0	0	0
14	DF	Michael Nelson	3	0	0	0	0	0
16	MF	Josh Wright	3	0	0	0	1	0
17	FW	Robert Grant	2	0	0	0	0	0
18	MF	Michael Collins	4	0	0	0	0	0
19	FW	Lee Miller	1	0	0	0	0	0
20	MF	Abdisalam Ibrahim	1	1	0	0	0	0
21	DF	Eddie Nolan	3	0	0	0	0	0
22	GK	Josh Lillis	1	0	0	0	0	0
25	DF	Niall Canavan	2	0	0	0	0	0
28	DF	Paul Reid	3	1	0	0	0	0
31	MF	Mark Duffy	2	0	0	0	0	0
33	FW	Joe Garner	4	1	0	0	0	0
—	GK	Tony Warner	1	0	0	0	0	0

== Transfers ==
=== Ins ===
No.	Pos.	Nat.	Name	Age	EU	Moving from	Type	Transfer window	Ends	Transfer fee	Source
9	FW	(England)	Dagnall	24	EU	Rochdale	Transfer	Summer	2013	Free	BBC Sport
17	FW	(England)	Grant	19	EU	Accrington Stanley	Free Agent	Summer	2012	£260,000	BBC Sport
18	MF	(England)	Collins	24	EU	Huddersfield Town	Transfer	Summer	2013	Undisclosed	BBC Sport
28	DF	(Australia)	McClenahan	25	EU	Hamilton Academical (Scotland)	Free Agent	Summer	2011	Free	Scunthorpe United
32	FW	(England)	Cowan-Hall	20	EU		Free Agent		Non-Contract	Free	BBC Sport
33	GK	(Trinidad and Tobago) (England)	Warner	36	EU		Free Agent		2010	Free	BBC Sport
21	DF	(Republic of Ireland)	Nolan	22	EU	Preston North End	Transfer	Winter	2011	Undisclosed	BBC Sport
28	DF	(England)	Reid	28	EU	Colchester United	Transfer	Winter	2013	Undisclosed	Scunthorpe United
31	MF	(England)	Duffy	25	EU	Morecambe	Transfer	Winter	2013	Undisclosed	Scunthorpe United
10	MF	(England)	Hughes	33	EU	Leeds United	Transfer	Winter	2012	Free	Scunthorpe United
14	DF	(England)	Nelson	30	EU	Norwich City	Transfer	Winter	2013	Undisclosed	BBC Sport

=== Loans in ===
No.	P	Name	Country	Age	Loan club	Started	Ended	Start source	End source
21	DF	Nolan	(Republic of Ireland)	22	Preston North End	7 July	6 Jan	Scunthorpe United	BBC Sport
3	DF	McNulty	(England)	25	Brighton & Hove Albion	15 Jul	5 Dec	BBC Sport	Vital Football
31	MF	McDonald	(Scotland)	22	Burnley	14 Oct	20 Dec	BBC Sport	BBC Sport
10	FW	Sears	(England)	20	West Ham United	19 Oct	21 Dec	BBC Sport	Scunthorpe United
20	MF	N'Guessan	(France)	23	Leicester City	12 Nov	14 Dec	Scunthorpe United	Scunthorpe United
3	DF	Gordon	(England)	34	Chelsea	7 Jan		BBC Sport	
20	MF	Ibrahim	(Norway)	19	Manchester City	14 Jan	16 Mar	BBC Sport	Scunthorpe United
19	FW	Miller	(Scotland)	28	Middlesbrough	28 Jan		BBC Sport	
33	FW	Garner	(England)	23	Nottingham Forest	31 Jan		BBC Sport	
20	DF	Williams	(England)	25	Reading	24 Mar		BBC Sport	
7	MF	Núñez	(Honduras)	39	Leeds United	24 Mar		BBC Sport	

Sources: For loan start source see "Start source". For loan end source see "End source".
EU = if holds or not a European Union passport; Country: when 2 flags, 1st flag = country that plays for internationally, 2nd flag = country of birth; No. = number on jersey; P = Position (for position name, pause mouse pointer on abbreviation); Name = Name on jersey (for more extensive name, pause mouse pointer on name); In/Out = In: The player came in on loan, Out: The player went out on loan; Loan club = the club that the player moved on loan to or the club that the player came from on loan; Started = the date when the player's loan started; Ended = the date when the player's loan ended.

=== Out ===
N	P	Name	Country	Age	Type	Moving to	Transfer window	Transfer fee	Apps	Goals	Source
8	MF	McCann	(Northern Ireland)	30	Free	Peterborough United	Summer	n/a	113	20	Peterborough United
7	MF	Sparrow	(England)	28	Released	Brighton & Hove Albion	Summer	n/a	406	41	BBC Sport
	DF	Milne	(Scotland)	30	Released		Summer	n/a	8	0	Scunthorpe United
10	FW	Hooper	(England)	22	Transfer	Celtic (Scotland)	Summer	Undisclosed	95	50	BBC Sport
33	GK	Warner	(England)	36	Released			n/a	2	0	Scunthorpe United
28	DF	McClenahan	(Australia)	25	Contract End		Winter	n/a	1	0	Scunthorpe United
14	FW	Forte	(England)	24	Transfer	Southampton	Winter	Undisclosed	91	9	BBC Sport
7	MF	Woolford	(England)	25	Transfer	Bristol City	Winter	Undisclosed	125	20	BBC Sport

EU = if holds or not a European Union passport; Country: when 2 flags, 1st flag = country that plays for internationally, 2nd flag = country of birth; N = number on jersey; P = Position (for position name, pause mouse pointer on abbreviation); Name = Name on jersey (for more extensive name, pause mouse pointer on name); Age = age on the day of the signing; Moving from = only indicate the club the player was playing before start playing for this club in this season, for the type of the moving see Status column; Moving to = only indicates the club the player is going to play next, for the type of the moving see Status column; Ends = when the player's current contract ends; n/a = Not applicable; Apps = Total number of competitive appearances (including substitute appearances) at the club prior to departure; Goals = Total number of competitive goals scored at the club prior to departure.

=== Loans Outs ===
No.	P	Name	Country	Age	Loan club	Started	Ended	Start source	End source
22	GK	Lillis	(England)	23	Rochdale	6 Jul	6 Feb	BBC Sport	BBC Sport
27	MF	Morris	(Republic of Ireland)	38	Chesterfield	15 Jul		BBC Sport	
23	DF	Coleman	(England)	19	Boston United	5 Nov	5 Dec	Scunthorpe United	
17	FW	Grant	(England)	34	Rochdale	18 Nov	7 Jan	Scunthorpe United	Scunthorpe United
26	DF	Williams	(England)	33	Boston United	19 Nov	4 March	Boston United	
2	DF	Wright	(England)	25	Grimsby Town	29 Sep	26 Nov	Grimsby Town^{[usurped]}	Scunthorpe United
23	DF	Coleman	(England)	20	Boston United	10 Jan		Scunthorpe United	
32	FW	Cowan-Hall	(England)	20	Rushden & Diamonds	15 Feb		BBC Sport	
26	DF	Williams	(England)	19	Brigg Town	4 Mar		Scunthorpe United	
5	DF	Jones	(England)	31	Sheffield Wednesday	17 Mar		BBC Sport	
25	DF	Canavan	(Republic of Ireland)	20	Shrewsbury Town	22 Mar		BBC Sport	

Sources: For loan start source see "Start source". For loan end source see "End source".
EU = if holds or not a European Union passport; Country: when 2 flags, 1st flag = country that plays for internationally, 2nd flag = country of birth; No. = number on jersey; P = Position (for position name, pause mouse pointer on abbreviation); Name = Name on jersey (for more extensive name, pause mouse pointer on name); In/Out = In: The player came in on loan, Out: The player went out on loan; Loan club = the club that the player moved on loan to or the club that the player came from on loan; Started = the date when the player's loan started; Ended = the date when the player's loan ended.

=== Contracts ===
N	Pos.	Nat.	Name	Age	Status	Contract length	Expiry date	Source
24	FW	(England)	Godden	18	Signed	1 year	June 2012	Scunthorpe United
13	GK	(England)	Slocombe	22	Signed	1 year	June 2012	Scunthorpe United
4	MF	(England)	Togwell	25	Signed	2 years	June 2013	Scunthorpe United
14	FW	(Barbados) (England)	Forte	23	Signed	1 year	June 2012	Scunthorpe United
24	FW	(England)	Godden	19	Signed	3 year	June 2014	Scunthorpe United

== Fixtures and results ==
Win Draw Loss Upcoming fixture

=== Football League Championship ===
7 August 2010 1	Reading	1–2	Scunthorpe United	Reading
15:00 BST	Sigurðsson 26'; Gunnarsson (substituted off) Tabb (substituted in) 59'; Karacan (substituted off) Church (substituted in) 70'; McAunff (substituted off) Antonio (substituted in) 75'	report	9' Thompson; (substituted off) 49' Mirfin (substituted in) Raynes; 60' Jones; (substituted off) 73' Dagnall (substituted in) Woolford; (yellow card) 84' Murphy; (substituted off) 89' O'Connor (substituted in) A Wright; (yellow card) 90+5' Thompson	Stadium: Madjeski Stadium; Attendance: 15,914; Referee: Graham

14 August 2010 2	Scunthorpe United	0–1	Norwich City	Scunthorpe
15:00 BST	O'Connor (substituted off) Collins (substituted in) 66'; J Wright (substituted off) A Wright (substituted in) 66'; Collins (yellow card) 85'	report	(substituted off) 80' Martin (substituted in) Jackson; (yellow card) 89' Crofts; 90+1' Holt	Stadium: Glanford Park; Attendance: 6,042; Referee: Sarginson

21 August 2010 3	Queens Park Rangers	2–0	Scunthorpe United	London
15:00 BST	Orr 17'; Helguson 41'; Taarabt (yellow card) 43'; Taarabt (substituted off) Buzsáky (substituted in) 73'; Derry (substituted off) Leigertwood (substituted in) 86'; Helguson (substituted off) German (substituted in) 90+1'	report	(substituted off) 76' Woolford (substituted in) Grant; (substituted off) 82' McNulty (substituted in) Byrne	Stadium: Loftus Road; Attendance: 12,046; Referee: Salisbury

28 August 2010 4	Scunthorpe United	3–0	Crystal Palace	Scunthorpe
15:00 BST	Forte 33', 40+1'; O'Connor 71'; O'Connor (substituted off) Woolford (substituted in) 82'; Dagnall (substituted off) Grant (substituted in) 84'	report	(substituted off) 31' McCarthy (substituted in) Obika; (substituted off) 72' Cadogan (substituted in) Dorman; (substituted off) 90' Couñago (substituted in) Andrew	Stadium: Glanford Park; Attendance: 5,292; Referee: Whitestone

11 September 2010 5	Scunthorpe United	0–2	Bristol City	Scunthorpe
15:00 BST	Jones (substituted off) Canavan (substituted in) 23'; Canavan (yellow card) 43'; Togwell (substituted off) Woolford (substituted in) 61'; Byrne (substituted off) Grant (substituted in) 78'; O'Connor (yellow card) 82'	report	16' Adomah; (substituted off) 54' Adomah (substituted in) Sproule; (substituted off) 64' Stewart (substituted in) Carey; (substituted off) 74' Pitman (substituted in) Clarkson; (yellow card) 75' Clarkson; (yellow card) 82' Elliott; 90+5' Clarkson	Stadium: Glanford Park; Attendance: 5,185; Referee: Haines

14 September 2010 6	Sheffield United	0–4	Scunthorpe United	Sheffield
19:45 BST	Bartley (yellow card) 59'; Montgomery (substituted off) Yeates (substituted in) 64'; Evans (substituted off) Bogdanovic (substituted in) 79'	report	33' Dagnall; 63' Mirfin; (substituted off) 70' O'Connor (substituted in) Woolford; 73' Dagnall; (substituted off) 84' Dagnall (substituted in) Grant; (substituted off) 87' Wright (substituted in) Raynes; 90+3' Woolford	Stadium: Bramall Lane; Attendance: 19,390; Referee: Swarbrick

18 September 2010 7	Swansea City	2–0	Scunthorpe United	Swansea
15:00 BST	Monk (yellow card) 19'; Williams (yellow card) 31'; Allen (yellow card) 42'; Nouble (substituted off) Dobbie (substituted in) 65'; Allen (substituted off) Cotterill (substituted in) 76'; Sinclair 83'; Dobbie 85'; Dyer (substituted off) Serran (substituted in) 90+3'	report	(yellow card) 38' Collins; (substituted off) 67' Collins (substituted in) Woolford; (substituted off) 86' Togwell (substituted in) Grant; (substituted off) 87' Dagnall (substituted in) Jones	Stadium: Liberty Stadium; Attendance: 13,597; Referee: Danny McDermid

25 September 2010 8	Scunthorpe United	1–1	Ipswich Town	Scunthorpe
15:00 BST	Byrne (yellow card) 28'; Mirfin 30'; J Wright (substituted off) O'Connor; Collins (substituted off) Grant (substituted in) 83'	report	(substituted off) 31' Wickham (substituted in) Hyam; (substituted off) 46' Townsend (substituted in) Peters; 57' Peters; (substituted off) 72' Scotland (substituted in) Priskin	Stadium: Glanford Park; Attendance: 5,931; Referee: Haywood

28 September 2010 9	Scunthorpe United	0–0	Barnsley	Scunthorpe
19:45 BST	Collins (substituted off) Grant (substituted in) 56'; Wright (substituted off) O'Connor	report	(yellow card) 45+1' Lovre; (substituted off) 72' Hassell (substituted in) Doyle; (substituted off) 77' Gray (substituted in) Wood	Stadium: Glanford Park; Attendance: 5,421; Referee: Shoelbridge

2 October 2010 10	Leicester City	3–1	Scunthorpe United	Leicester
15:00 BST	Waghorn 10'; Dyer 54'; Howard (yellow card) 65'; Gallagher (substituted off) Abe (substituted in) 67'; Dyer (substituted off) Moussa (substituted in) 87'; Moussa 90+3'	report	(substituted off) 56' Grant (substituted in) O'Connor; 60' O'Connor; (substituted off) 78' Togwell (substituted in) Collins	Stadium: Walkers Stadium; Attendance: 20,652; Referee: Hegley

16 October 2010 11	Scunthorpe United	1–3	Doncaster Rovers	Scunthorpe
15:00 BST	Woolford 11'; Jones (yellow card) 58'; Forte (substituted off) Thompson; Togwell (substituted off) O'Connor (substituted in) 73'; Collins (substituted off) Grant (substituted in) 85'	report	(substituted off) 18' Friend (substituted in) Hird; (yellow card) 24' Lockwood; 31', 59' Sharp; 72' O'Connor; (substituted off) 84' Oster (substituted in) Stock; (substituted off) 88' Gillett (substituted in) Wilson	Stadium: Glanford Park; Attendance: 7,005; Referee: Oliver

19 October 2010 12	Preston North End	2–3	Scunthorpe United	Preston
19:45 BST	King (substituted off) Parry (substituted in) 46'; Russell (yellow card) 50'; Morgan 58'; Jones 64'; Hayes (substituted off) Parkin (substituted in) 68'	report	4' Dagnall; (yellow card) 42' Wright; (substituted off) 46' Jones (substituted in) Raynes; 65' O'Connor; (substituted off) 75' Dagnall (substituted in) Thompson; 82' Woolford	Stadium: Deepdale Stadium; Attendance: 11,179; Referee: Mathieson

23 October 2010 13	Watford	0–2	Scunthorpe United	Watford
15:00 BST	Graham (yellow card) 58'; Graham (substituted off) Deeney (substituted in) 64'; Sordell (substituted off) Whichelow (substituted in) 73'; Mutch (substituted off) Walker (substituted in) 82'; Deeney (yellow card) 90+1'	report	28' Byrne; 40+1' Woolford; (substituted off) 73' Dagnall (substituted in) Thompson; (yellow card) 83' Warner; (substituted off) 85' Sears (substituted in) Forte	Stadium: Vicarage Road; Attendance: 12,366; Referee: East

30 October 2010 14	Scunthorpe United	1–4	Leeds United	Scunthorpe
15:00 BST	Byrne 27'; Mirfin (substituted off) Canavan (substituted in) 46'; Dagnall (substituted off) Thompson (substituted in) 68'; Wright (substituted off) Forte (substituted in) 76'	report	8' Gradel; (yellow card) 42' Connolly; (substituted off) 55' Faye (substituted in) Johnson; 60', 74', 75' Howson; (substituted off) 81' Becchio (substituted in) Paynter; (substituted off) 83' Snodgrass (substituted in) Núñez	Stadium: Glanford Park; Attendance: 8,122; Referee: Booth

6 November 2010 15	Hull City	0–1	Scunthorpe United	Kingston upon Hull
15:00 GMT	Kilbane (yellow card) 31'; Zayatte (yellow card) 55'; Kilbane (substituted off) Garcia (substituted in) 61'; Simpson (substituted off) Bostock (substituted in) 61'; Cullen (substituted off) Barmby (substituted in) 72'	report	(yellow card) 15' Canavan; (yellow card) 37' Nolan; (substituted off) 67' Dagnall (substituted in) Forte; (substituted off) 80' Woolford (substituted in) Grant; 89' O'Connor; (substituted off) 90+1' Sears (substituted in) Collins	Stadium: KC Stadium; Attendance: 21,873; Referee: Taylor

9 November 2010 16	Scunthorpe United	0–2	Middlesbrough	Scunthorpe
19:45 GMT	Nolan (yellow card) 32'; Dagnall (substituted off) Forte (substituted in) 63'; Collins (substituted off) McDonald (substituted in) 63'; Byrne (yellow card) 71'; Wright (substituted off) Grant (substituted in) 73'; O'Connor (yellow card) 90+4'	report	6' Boyd; 23' McDonald; (yellow card) 43' McDonald; (yellow card) 53' Arca; (substituted off) 58' Kink (substituted in) Hoyte; (substituted off) 69' Boyd (substituted in) Lita; (yellow card) 71' McMahon; (substituted off) 83' Arca (substituted in) Bailey; (yellow card) 88' Hoyte	Stadium: Glanford Park; Attendance: 5,475; Referee: Wright

13 November 2010 17	Scunthorpe United	2–4	Cardiff City	Scunthorpe
15:00 GMT	McDonald 45'; Woolford (substituted off) Dagnall (substituted in) 72'; N'Guessan 73'; Sears (substituted off) Grant (substituted in) 82'; Jones (substituted off) McNulty (substituted in) 89'	report	2' Bothroyd; 9' Chopra; (substituted off) 13' Burke (substituted in) Koumas; 34' Bothroyd; (yellow card) 45+1' McNaughton; (substituted off) 60' Blake (substituted in) Gyepes; (substituted off) 60' Naylor (substituted in) Matthews; 79' Olofinjana	Stadium: Glanford Park; Attendance: 5,333; Referee: Ilderton

20 November 2010 18	Derby County	3–2	Scunthorpe United	Derby
15:00 GMT	Cywka 3'; Commons 37'; Moore 59'; Bueno (substituted off) Pringle (substituted in) 63'; Roberts (yellow card) 73'; Roberts (red card) 75'; Commons (substituted off) Moxey (substituted in) 76'; Moore (substituted off) Kuqi (substituted in) 87'	report	27' Forte; (yellow card) 30' Wright; (yellow card) 40' Byrne; (substituted off) 45+3' Raynes (substituted in) McClenahan; (substituted off) 55' N'Guessan (substituted in) Woolford; 75' O'Connor; (substituted off) 84' Forte (substituted in) Thompson	Stadium: Pride Park Stadium; Attendance: 25,189; Referee: Linington

27 November 2010 19	Scunthorpe United	0–2	Coventry City	Scunthorpe
15:00 GMT	Sears (substituted off) Dagnall (substituted in) 66'; Wright (substituted off) Thompson (substituted in) 75'	report	31' McSheffery; 72' (O.G.) Murphy; (substituted off) 84' King (substituted in) Jutkiewicz; (yellow card) 88' McPake; (substituted off) 90' Gunnarsson (substituted in) Clarke; (substituted off) 90+1' McSheffery (substituted in) Eastwood	Stadium: Glanford Park; Attendance: 4,397; Referee: Pawson

4 December 2010 20	Millwall	3–0	Scunthorpe United	London
15:00 GMT	Henry 23'; Andrew (substituted off) McQuoid (substituted in) 46'; Morison 81', 86'; Puncheon (substituted off) Schofield (substituted in) 88'	report	(substituted off) 60' Sears (substituted in) Thompson; (substituted off) 60' O'Connor (substituted in) Forte; (yellow card) 77' Jones; (substituted off) 79' Wright (substituted in) McDonald; (yellow card) 90+3' McDonald	Stadium: The Den; Attendance: 8,937; Referee: Booth

11 December 2010	Scunthorpe United	P – P	Nottingham Forest	Scunthorpe
15:00 GMT		report		Stadium: Glanford Park

18 December 2010	Portsmouth	P – P	Scunthorpe United	Portsmouth
15:00 GMT		report		Stadium: Fratton Park

28 December 2010 21	Burnley	0–2	Scunthorpe United	Burnley
15:00 GMT	Rodriguez (yellow card) 13'; Elliott (substituted off) Eagles (substituted in) 46'; Gudietti (substituted off) Iwelumo (substituted in) 55'; Wallace (substituted off) Thompson	report	(yellow card) 2' Nolan; 14' Woolford; (substituted off) 77' Thompson (substituted in) Collins; (substituted off) 81' Forte (substituted in) Gooden; 84' Dagnall; (substituted off) 90+2' Dagnall (substituted in) J Wright	Stadium: Turf Moor; Attendance: 15,043; Referee: Woolmer

1 January 2011 22	Doncaster Rovers	3–0	Scunthorpe United	Doncaster
15:00 GMT	Martis (substituted off) Lockwood (substituted in) 17'; Sharp 26'; Hird (yellow card) 33'; O'Connor (yellow card) 37'; Hayter 38'; Mills 45+2'; Stock (substituted off) Shiels (substituted in) 63'; Hayter (substituted off) Healy (substituted in) 80'; (red card) 85'Hird	report	(yellow card) 26' Murphy; (substituted off) 46' Forte (substituted in) Gooden; (yellow card) 55' Byrne; (substituted off) 62' O'Connor (substituted in) J Wright; (substituted off) 73' Dagnall (substituted in) Thompson; (yellow card) 83' Collins	Stadium: Keepmoat Stadium; Attendance: 9,447; Referee: Tierney

3 January 2011 23	Scunthorpe United	1–2	Watford	Scunthorpe
15:00 GMT	Woolford 60'; Forte (substituted off) Gooden (substituted in) 65'; O'Connor (yellow card) 69'; O'Connor (substituted off) Togwell (substituted in) 72'; Thompson (substituted off) Cowan-Hall (substituted in) 73'	report	(substituted off) 40' Cowie (substituted in) Deeney; (substituted off) 46' Taylor (substituted in) Bennett; 64' Graham; (substituted off) 66' Graham (substituted in) Whichelow; 85' Whichelow	Stadium: Glanford Park; Attendance: 4,498; Referee: Haines

15 January 2011 24	Leeds United	4–0	Scunthorpe United	Leeds
15:00 GMT	Watt 17'; Gradel 20'; Johnson 29'; Becchio (substituted off) Paynter (substituted in) 47'; Snodgrass (substituted off) McCormack (substituted in) 67'; Watt (substituted off) Somma (substituted in) 80'; Somma 88'	report	(substituted off) 59' Grant (substituted in) Forte; (substituted off) 77' Dagnall (substituted in) Gooden	Stadium: Elland Road; Attendance: 25,446; Referee: Graham

22 January 2011 25	Scunthorpe United	0–0	Burnley	Scunthorpe
17:20 GMT		report		Stadium: Glanford Park; Attendance: 4,334; Referee: Hegley

1 February 2010 26	Middlesbrough	2–0	Scunthorpe United	Middlesbrough
19:45 GMT	Boyd 8'; McMahon 69'		Ibrahim (red card) 74'	Stadium: Riverside Stadium; Attendance: 14,364; Referee: Lewis

5 February 2011 27	Scunthorpe United	1–5	Hull City	Scunthorpe
15:00	Garner 33'		Fryatt 5', 73' (pen.), 89'; McLean 50', 81'	Stadium: Glanford Park; Attendance: 6,835

12 February 2011 28	Cardiff City	1–0	Scunthorpe United	Cardiff
15:00 GMT	Emmanuel-Thomas (substituted off) Burke (substituted in) 59'; Chopra (substituted off) Koumas (substituted in) 67'; Bellamy (substituted off) Parkin (substituted in) 79'; Olofinjana 85'	report	(substituted off) 71' Duffy (substituted in) Collins; (yellow card) 82' Garner; (substituted off) 82' Garner (substituted in) Ibrahim; (substituted off) 87' J Wright (substituted in) Grant	Stadium: Cardiff City Stadium; Attendance: 21,604; Referee: Crossley

16 February 2011 29	Scunthorpe United	1–0	Nottingham Forest	Scunthorpe
19:45 GMT	Dagnall 19'; Reid (yellow card) 65'; Duffy (substituted off) Raynes (substituted in) 68'; Nolan (substituted off) A Wright (substituted in) 72'; Dagnall (substituted off) Grant	report	(substituted off) 65' McGugan (substituted in) McGoldrick; (substituted off) 65' Tyson (substituted in) Adebola; (substituted off) 88' Earnshaw (substituted in) McCleary	Stadium: Glanford Park; Referee: Russell

19 February 2011 30	Scunthorpe United	0–0	Derby County	Scunthorpe
15:00 GMT	Wright (substituted off) Collins (substituted in) 68'; Garner (substituted off) Grant (substituted in) 78'; Duffy (substituted off) Ibrahim (substituted in) 83'; Grant (yellow card) 86'	report	(yellow card) 36' Addison; (substituted off) 71' Ward (substituted in) Cywka; (substituted off) 77' Davies (substituted in) Porter	Stadium: Glanford Park; Attendance: 5,696; Referee: Mathieson

21 February 2011 31	Scunthorpe United	3–2	Sheffield United	Scunthorpe
19:45 GMT	A Wright (yellow card) 30'; Garner 37' (pen.); Garner 44'; Miller 53'; Nelson (yellow card) 56'; Hughes (substituted off) Collins (substituted in) 76'; Togwell (substituted off) Ibrahim (substituted in) 79'; Duffy (substituted off) Raynes (substituted in) 83'	report	6' Evans; 7' Cresswell; (yellow card) 50' Quinn; (substituted off) 61' Ertl (substituted in) Bogdanovic; (substituted off) 71' Cresswell (substituted in) Bent; (substituted off) 73' Nosworthy (substituted in) Yeates; (red card) 89' Lowry	Stadium: Glanford Park; Attendance: 6,281; Referee: Foster

26 February 2011 32	Bristol City	2–0	Scunthorpe United	Bristol
15:00 GMT	Clarkson 13'; Caulker (substituted off) Stewart (substituted in) 14'; Adomah (substituted off) Campbell-Ryce; Maynard 49'; Maynard (substituted off) Keogh (substituted in) 85'	report	(substituted off) 27' Reid (substituted in) Raynes; (yellow card) 31' Nelson; (substituted off) 59' Duffy (substituted in) Ibrahim; (substituted off) 66' Miller (substituted in) Grant	Stadium: Ashton Gate; Attendance: 14,423; Referee: Hooper

1 March 2011 33	Portsmouth	2–0	Scunthorpe United	Portsmouth
19:45 GMT	Mullins (substituted off) Mokoena (substituted in) 22'; Kitson 62'; Mokoena 80'; Nugent (substituted off) Dickinson (substituted in) 84'; Cotterill (substituted off) Çiftçi (substituted in) 90'	report	(substituted off) 75' J Wright (substituted in) Hughes; (substituted off) 76' Ibrahim (substituted in) Garner	Stadium: Fratton Park; Attendance: 14,252; Referee: Salisbury

5 March 2011 34	Scunthorpe United	1–0	Swansea City	Scunthorpe
15:00 GMT	A Wright (yellow card) 17'; Collins (yellow card) 34'; Hughes (yellow card) 35'; Garner 71'; Garner (yellow card) 78'; Hughes (substituted off) Ibrahim; Collins (substituted off) Duffy (substituted in) 85'; Garner (substituted off) Grant (substituted in) 88'; Gordon (yellow card) 90+4'; Duffy (yellow card) 90+4'	report	(substituted off) 66' Britton (substituted in) Dobbie; (yellow card) 70' Tate; (substituted off) 75' Taylor (substituted in) Moore	Stadium: Glanford Park; Attendance: 4,608; Referee: Hill

8 March 2011 35	Barnsley	2–1	Scunthorpe United	Barnsley
19:45 GMT	Doyle (yellow card) 40'; Harewood 62'; McShane (yellow card) 68'; O'Brien (substituted off) Devaney (substituted in) 69'; Haynes (substituted off) Gray (substituted in) 82'; Harewood 83'; Mellis (substituted off) Butterfield (substituted in) 83'	report	(substituted off) 63' Togwell (substituted in) Duffy; (yellow card) 69' Lillis; (substituted off) 78' J Wright (substituted in) Ibrahim; (substituted off) 78' Miller (substituted in) Dagnall; 90+1' Collins	Stadium: Oakwell; Attendance: 10,250; Referee: Wright

12 March 2011 36	Scunthorpe United	0–3	Leicester City	Scunthorpe
15:00 GMT	Gordon (substituted off) Nolan (substituted in) 46'; Garner (yellow card) 68'; Hughes (substituted off) Collins (substituted in) 71'; Dagnall (substituted off) Ibrahim	report	31' Vítor; (yellow card) 33' Mee; (yellow card) 56' Naughton; 72' Vítor; (yellow card) 73' Yakubu; (substituted off) 75' Yakubu (substituted in) Waghorn; 76' Naughton; (substituted off) 81' Gallagher (substituted in) Oakley; (substituted off) 86' Vassell (substituted in) Dyer	Stadium: Glanford Park; Attendance: 6,528; Referee: Shoebridge

15 March 2011 37	Scunthorpe United	0–3	Preston North End	Scunthorpe
19:45 GMT	Hughes (substituted off) A Wright (substituted in) 35'; Reid (yellow card) 54'; Reid (substituted off) O'Connor (substituted in) 57'; Duffy (substituted off) Dagnall (substituted in) 63'	report	32' Treacy; 37' Jones; 43' Hume; (substituted off) 71' Hume (substituted in) Ellington; (substituted off) 80' Treacy (substituted in) Parry; (substituted off) 85' Nicholson (substituted in) Johnson	Stadium: Glanford Park; Attendance: 4,190; Referee: Miller

19 March 2011 38	Ipswich Town	2–0	Scunthorpe United	Ipswich
15:00 GMT	Leadbitter (yellow card) 11'; Edwards 26'; Martin (yellow card) 49'; Bullard 53'; Carson (substituted off) Drury (substituted in) 71'; McAuley (yellow card) 72'; Leadbitter (substituted off) Healy (substituted in) 87'	report	(yellow card) 52' O'Connor; (substituted off) 56' Gordon (substituted in) Grant; (substituted off) 63' Duffy (substituted in) Collins; (substituted off) 83' Miller (substituted in) Dagnall	Stadium: Portman Road; Attendance: 17,787; Referee: Webb

2 April 2011 39	Norwich City	6–0	Scunthorpe United	Norwich
15:00 BST	Holt 10'; Holt 32' (pen.); Holt 61'; Hoolahan (substituted off) Lansbury (substituted in) 64'; Holt (substituted off) Vokes (substituted in) 66'; Pacheco (substituted off) Jackson; Jackson 75'; Jackson 77'; Jackson 90+4'	report	(red card) 31' Reid; (substituted off) 33' Núñez (substituted in) Togwell; (substituted off) 62' Collins (substituted in) Duffy; (substituted off) 67' Garner (substituted in) Dagnall	Stadium: Carrow Road; Attendance: 26,512; Referee: Langford

9 April 2011 40	Scunthorpe United	4–1	Queens Park Rangers	Scunthorpe
15:00 BST	Garner 28'; Garner 48'; O'Connor 58'; O'Connor (yellow card) 77'; Duffy 79'; O'Connor (substituted off) J Wright (substituted in) 84'; Togwell (substituted off) Raynes (substituted in) 90+2'; Garner (substituted off) Miller (substituted in) 90+2'	report	7' Hulse; (substituted off) 46' Shittu (substituted in) Chimbonda; (substituted off) 61' Hulse (substituted in) Miller; (substituted off) 62' Derry (substituted in) Agyemang; (yellow card) 75' Miller; (yellow card) 82' Orr	Stadium: Glanford Park; Attendance: 6,061; Referee: Ilderton

12 April 2011 41	Scunthorpe United	0–2	Reading	Scunthorpe
19:45 BST	Dagnall (yellow card) 14'; Nelson (yellow card) 38'; O'Connor (substituted off) J Wright (substituted in) 46'; J Wright (yellow card) 52'; Murphy (yellow card) 62'; Togwell (yellow card) 68'; Duffy (substituted off) Miller (substituted in) 74'	report	(yellow card) 36' Mills; 57' Long; 63' Harte; (substituted off) 65' Manset (substituted in) Church; (yellow card) 66' Karacan; (substituted off) 68' Karacan (substituted in) Tabb; (yellow card) 85' Leigertwood; (yellow card) 88' Church	Stadium: Glanford Park; Attendance: 4,458; Referee: Woolmer

16 April 2011 42	Crystal Palace	1–2	Scunthorpe United	London
15:00 BST	Dikgacoi (yellow card) 43'; Vaughan (yellow card) 40+1'; Dikgacoi (substituted off) Zaha (substituted in) 46'; McCarthy (yellow card) 60'; Ambrose (substituted off) Scannell (substituted in) 60'; Scannell 70'; Agustien (substituted off) Couñago (substituted in) 77'; Danns (yellow card) 83'; Moxey (yellow card) 87'; Scannell (red card) 90+2'	report	(yellow card) 23' Garner; 25' Mirfin; (yellow card) 39' Hughes; 57' Núñez; (yellow card) 74' Duffy; (substituted off) 75' Duffy (substituted in) Grant; (yellow card) 77' Núñez; (red card) 86' Garner; (substituted off) 88' Dagnall (substituted in) Miller	Stadium: Selhurst Park; Attendance: 17,810; Referee: Stroud

22 April 2011 43	Coventry City	1–1	Scunthorpe United	Coventry
15:00 BST	King 5'; Baker (substituted off) McIndoe (substituted in) 46'; Jutkiewicz (substituted off) Eastwood (substituted in) 59'; Hussey (substituted off) Wood (substituted in) 75'	report	38' Núñez; (substituted off) 88' Dagnall (substituted in) Miller; (substituted off) 88' Collins (substituted in) O'Connor; (substituted off) 90+2' Duffy (substituted in) Gordon	Stadium: Ricoh Arena; Attendance: 16,705; Referee: Bates

25 April 2011 44	Scunthorpe United	1–2	Millwall	Scunthorpe
15:00 BST	Nolan (substituted off) O'Connor (substituted in) 62'; Duffy (substituted off) Grant (substituted in) 62'; O'Connor 88' (pen.)	report	39' Marquis; 50' Marquis; (substituted off) 76' McQuoid (substituted in) Bouazza; (substituted off) 76' Marquis (substituted in) Schofield; (substituted off) 90+1' Townsend (substituted in) Purse	Stadium: Glanford Park; Attendance: 5,190; Referee: Moss

30 April 2011 45	Nottingham Forest	5–1	Scunthorpe United	Nottingham
15:00 BST	Boyd 9'; Chambers 25'; Earnshaw (yellow card) 45+2'; McGoldrick (substituted off) Anderson (substituted in) 46'; McKenna (substituted off) Moussi (substituted in) 46'; Anderson 48'; Morgan (yellow card) 53'; McGugan (substituted off) Bennett (substituted in) 77'; Chambers 88'; Earnshaw (red card) 89'; Boyd 90'	report	36' (pen.) O'Connor; (substituted off) 37' Dagnall (substituted in) Miller; (yellow card) 51' Miller; (substituted off) 76' Duffy (substituted in) Collins; (substituted off) 87' A Wright (substituted in) Nolan	Stadium: City Ground; Attendance: 27,949; Referee: Whitestone

7 May 2011 46	Scunthorpe United	1–1	Portsmouth	Scunthorpe
12:45 BST	Núñez 27'; Lillis (substituted off) Slocombe (substituted in) 63'; O'Connor (yellow card) 73'; Grant (substituted off) Collins (substituted in) 75'; Duffy (substituted off) Miller (substituted in) 79'	report	(yellow card) 28' Hreiðarsson; (substituted off) 57' Hogg (substituted in) Cotterill; (yellow card) 67' Mokoena; (substituted off) 79' Ward (substituted in) Webber; 81' Nugent; (substituted off) 84' Mokoena (substituted in) Dickinson	Stadium: Glanford Park; Attendance: 5,142; Referee: Atkinson

=== FA Cup ===
8 January 2011 Round 3	Scunthorpe United	1–5	Everton	Scunthorpe
15:00 GMT	Jones (substituted off) Raynes (substituted in) 46'; Collins 46'; Dagnall (substituted off) Gooden (substituted in) 66'; J Wright (substituted off) Togwell (substituted in) 79'	report	4' Saha; (yellow card) 9' Heitinga; 33' Beckford; 58' Coleman; (substituted off) 64' Saha (substituted in) Anichebe; 73' Fellaini; (substituted off) 74' Fellaini (substituted in) Rodwell; (substituted off) 78' Coleman (substituted in) Gueye; 83' Baines	Stadium: Glanford Park; Attendance: 7,028; Referee: Friend

=== League Cup ===
10 August 2010 Round 1	Scunthorpe United	2–1	Oldham Athletic	Scunthorpe
19:45 GMT	J Wright (substituted off) Togwell (substituted in) 38'; Togwell (yellow card) 58'; Forte 65'; Dagnall (yellow card) 77'; O'Connor (substituted off) Collins (substituted in) 82'; Woolford 83'; Dagnall (substituted off) Grant (substituted in) 88'; Togwell (red card) 90+2'	report	23' Bembo-Leta; (yellow card) 38' Jarrett; (substituted off) 67' Kelly (substituted in) Taylor; (substituted off) 85' Alessandra (substituted in) Crompton	Stadium: Glanford Park; Attendance: 2,602; Referee: Rushton

24 August 2010 Round 2	Scunthorpe United	4–2	Sheffield Wednesday	Scunthorpe
19:45 GMT	Collins 45+2'; Dagnall 49'; O'Connor 68' (pen.); Forte (substituted off) Grant (substituted in) 70'; Byrne (yellow card) 75'; O'Connor (substituted off) A Wright (substituted in) 77'; Dagnall 82'; Dagnall (substituted off) Boyes (substituted in) 89'	report	(yellow card) 28' Beevers; (substituted off) 53' Heffernan (substituted in) Mellor; (substituted off) 57' Sedgewick (substituted in) Miller; (substituted off) 57' Teale (substituted in) Tudgay; (yellow card) 61' Miller; (red card) 67' Hinds; 75' Tudgay; 83' Mellor	Stadium: Glanford Park; Attendance: 4,860; Referee: Miller

22 September 2010 Round 3	Scunthorpe United	2–5	Manchester United	Scunthorpe
19:45 GMT	J Wright 19'; J Wright (yellow card) 19'; O'Connor (substituted off) Grant (substituted in) 61'; Collins (substituted off) Togwell (substituted in) 72'; Dagnall (substituted off) Gooden (substituted in) 81'; Woolford 90+1'	report	23' Gibson; 36' Smalling; 49' Owen; 54' Park; (substituted off) 68' Hernández (substituted in) Obertan; 71' Owen; (substituted off) 74' Park (substituted in) Bébé	Stadium: Glanford Park; Attendance: 9,077; Referee: Dean
