= 2009–10 Scunthorpe United F.C. season =

Scunthorpe United
2009–10 season
- Chairman: J. Steven Wharton
- Manager: Nigel Adkins
- Stadium: Glanford Park
- Football League Championship: 20th
- FA Cup: Fourth round
- League Cup: Fourth round
- Top goalscorer: Gary Hooper (19)

During the 2009–10 English football season, Scunthorpe United F.C. competed in the Football League Championship.

== Season summary ==
Scunthorpe struggled all season on their return to the Championship, but eventually managed to survive. The goals of Gary Hooper, who was third-highest top-scorer in the Championship with 19, ahead of the likes of Charlie Adam and Andy Carroll, were crucial to the club's survival, but he left at the end of the season to join Scottish giants Celtic. His strike partner, Paul Hayes, also left, to Preston North End, making Scunthorpe's task of surviving in the Championship for a second consecutive season all the more difficult.

== Kit ==
Scunthorpe's kit was manufactured by Carlotti and sponsored by Rainham Steel, with Smith's Fashion as secondary kit sponsors. Scunthorpe's home kits reverted to stripes for the first time since 1992, with the home kits featuring blue shirts, black shorts and blue socks with black turnovers.

== Squad ==
Note: Flags indicate national team as defined under FIFA eligibility rules; some limited exceptions apply. Players may hold more than one non-FIFA nationality.

No.	Pos.	Nation	Player
1	GK	IRL	Joe Murphy
2	MF	ENG	Andrew Wright
3	DF	ENG	Marcus Williams
4	MF	ENG	Sam Togwell
5	DF	SCO	Kenny Milne
6	DF	IRL	Cliff Byrne (captain)
7	MF	ENG	Matthew Sparrow
8	MF	NIR	Grant McCann
9	FW	ENG	Paul Hayes
10	FW	ENG	Gary Hooper
11	MF	ENG	Garry Thompson
12	DF	ENG	Rob Jones
14	FW	BRB	Jonathan Forte
15	DF	ENG	David Mirfin
16	MF	ENG	Martyn Woolford

No.	Pos.	Nation	Player
17	FW	ENG	Ben May
18	MF	NIR	Michael O'Connor
19	MF	ENG	Josh Wright
20	FW	IRL	Donal McDermott (on loan from Manchester City)
21	DF	ENG	Jake Picton
22	GK	ENG	Josh Lillis
23	GK	ENG	Sam Slocombe
24	FW	ENG	Matt Godden
26	DF	ENG	Niall Canavan
27	MF	ENG	Ian Morris
28	DF	ENG	Rory Coleman
29	FW	ENG	Adam Boyes
30	DF	ENG	Andy Crosby
32	DF	ENG	Michael Raynes
33	DF	SCO	Jimmy McNulty (on loan from Brighton)

=== Left club during season ===
Note: Flags indicate national team as defined under FIFA eligibility rules; some limited exceptions apply. Players may hold more than one non-FIFA nationality.

No.	Pos.	Nation	Player
20	MF	ENG	Kevan Hurst (to Carlisle United)
20	DF	ENG	Jordan Spence (on loan from West Ham United)
25	FW	ENG	Peter Winn (on loan to Gateshead)

No.	Pos.	Nation	Player
31	DF	ENG	George Friend (on loan from Wolves)
31	DF	IRL	Brendan Moloney (on loan from Forest)
32	DF	ENG	Bondz N'Gala (on loan from West Ham United)

== Competitions ==
Win Draw Loss

=== League ===
Round	1	2	3	4	5	6	7	8	9	10	11	12	13	14	15	16	17	18	19	20	21	22	23
Result	0–4	3–2	0–2	0–4	0–1	4–0	3–1	1–1	2–2	0–2	1–2	3–1	2–1	0–3	0–2	1–4	0–3	1–1	1–0	1–1	1–1	0–3	1–3
Position	24	10	15	18	20	18	12	13	15	17	19	18	14	16	18	19	21	20	18	18	18	20	21

Round	24	25	26	27	28	29	30	31	32	33	34	35	36	37	38	39	40	41	42	43	44	45	46
Result	4–1	1–1	2–0	1–0	1–2	0–2	1–5	2–1	2–2	1–1	1–2	0–1	0–3	2–1	4–0	1–0	2–4	0–3	2–3	3–0	2–2	3–4	2–2
Position	19	19	18	16	19	21	21	17	18	17	19	22	22	20	19	19	19	19	20	19	19	20	20

==== August ====
8 August 2009	Cardiff City	4–0	Scunthorpe United	Cardiff, Wales
15:00 BST	Chopra 21', 45'; Bothroyd 31'; Whittingham 90'	Report		Stadium: Cardiff City Stadium; Attendance: 22,264; Referee: Jonathan Moss

15 August 2009	Scunthorpe United	3–2	Derby County	Scunthorpe, Lincolnshire
15:00 BST	Hooper 17', 45'; Woolford 82'	Report	Green 20'; Commons 60'	Stadium: Glanford Park; Attendance: 7,352; Referee: Graham Horwood

18 August 2009	Scunthorpe United	0–2	Middlesbrough	Scunthorpe, Lincolnshire
19:45 BST		Report	Johnson 28' (53)	Stadium: Glanford Park; Attendance: 8,274; Referee: Michael Oliver

22 August 2009	Sheffield Wednesday	4–0	Scunthorpe United	Sheffield, South Yorkshire
15:00 BST	Wood 6'; Johnson 12'; Tudgay 34'; Potter 58'	Report		Stadium: Hillsborough Stadium; Attendance: 20,215; Referee: A Hall

29 August 2009	Scunthorpe United	0–1	QPR	Scunthorpe, Lincolnshire
15:00 BST		Report	Taarabt 3'	Stadium: Glanford Park; Attendance: 5,866; Referee: Graham Salisbury

A bruising return to life back in the Championship for Scunthorpe began with a 0–4 thrashing at the brand new Cardiff City Stadium which saw them immediately sink to the bottom of the table, although a win at home to Derby offered some form of redemption as well as hope that survival may not be beyond them. Defeats at home to recently relegated Middlesbrough and QPR, interspersed with another mauling on their travels at Sheffield Wednesday, meant that the Iron ended August having lost 4 out of 5 league games. Two wins in the League Cup provided some light relief as Scunny progressed into the third round of the competition.

==== September ====
12 September 2009	Crystal Palace	0–4	Scunthorpe United	Croydon, London
15:00 BST		Report	Forte 4'; Hayes 58'; Togwell 66'; O'Connor 68'	Stadium: Selhurst Park; Attendance: 12,912; Referee: Grant Hegley

15 September 2009	Scunthorpe United	3–1	Preston North End	Scunthorpe, Lincolnshire
19:45 BST	McCann 12'; Hooper 42' (53)	Report	Parkin 58'	Stadium: Glanford Park; Attendance: 5,383; Referee: Keith Hill

19 September 2009	Bristol City	1–1	Scunthorpe	Ashton Gate, Bristol
15:00 BST	Saborio 50'	Report	McCann 90+3'	Stadium: Ashton Gate Stadium; Attendance: 14,203; Referee: Danny McDermid

26 September 2009	Scunthorpe United	2–2	Doncaster Rovers	Scunthorpe, Lincolnshire
15:00 BST	Byrne 72'; McCann 90+3'	Report	Woods 13'; Sharp 61'	Stadium: Glanford Park; Attendance: 7,945; Referee: Keith Stroud

30 September 2009	Nottingham Forest	2–0	Scunthorpe	West Bridgford, Nottinghamshire
19:45 BST	Chambers 71'; Blackstock 76'	Report		Stadium: City Ground; Attendance: 18,332; Referee: David Webb

September began with a much greater encouragement as Scunthorpe kickstarted their season with an impressive 4–0 win at Crystal Palace, followed up with victory over Preston at Glanford Park. A pair of injury-time equalisers (both from Grant McCann), first at Bristol City then again at home to Doncaster, pushed them up to 15th in the early season table, before their 4-match unbeaten run was ended by Nottingham Forest at the City Ground.
