= Jimmy McNulty (footballer) =

English footballer (born 1985)

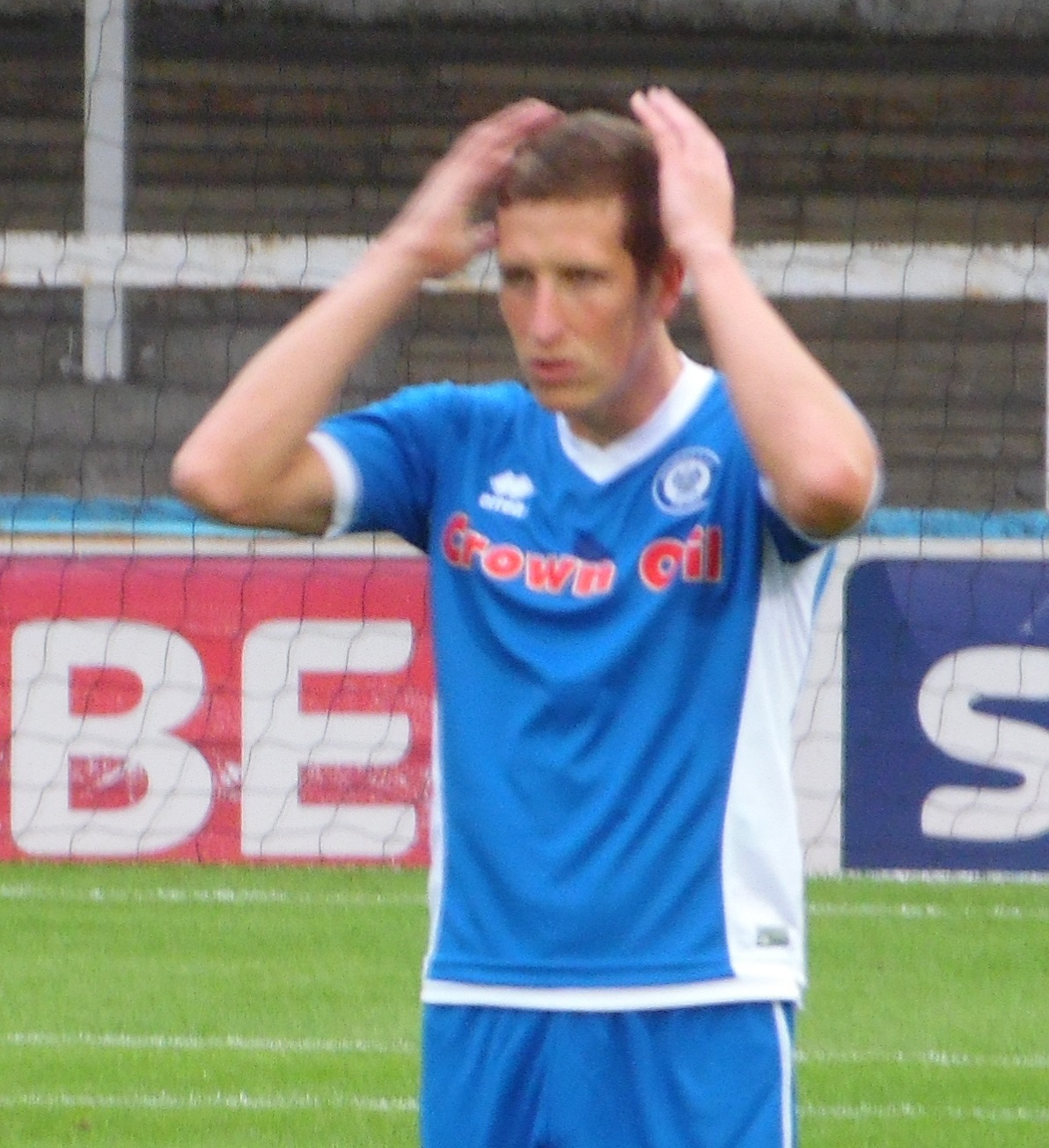
- McNulty playing for Rochdale in 2015

Personal information
- Full name: Jimmy McNulty
- Date of birth: 13 February 1985 (age 41)
- Place of birth: Runcorn, Cheshire, England
- Height: 6 ft 0 in (1.83 m)
- Position: Defender

Team information
- Current team: Stockport County (head coach)

Youth career
- 2001–2002: Liverpool
- 2002–2003: Everton

Senior career*
Years	Team	Apps	(Gls)
2003–2004	Wrexham	0	(0)
2004	→ Bangor City (loan)		
2004–2006	Caernarfon Town		
2006–2008	Macclesfield Town	34	(1)
2008–2009	Stockport County	39	(1)
2009–2011	Brighton & Hove Albion	13	(1)
2010	→ Scunthorpe United (loan)	3	(0)
2010	→ Scunthorpe United (loan)	6	(0)
2011–2014	Barnsley	56	(2)
2013–2014	→ Tranmere Rovers (loan)	12	(0)
2014–2015	Bury	46	(0)
2015–2023	Rochdale	197	(2)
2024–2025	Rochdale	0	(0)
Total		406	(7)

International career
2001–2002	Scotland U17	6	(0)
2003–2004	Scotland U19	4	(0)

Managerial career
- 2022: Rochdale (caretaker)
- 2023–2026: Rochdale
- 2026–: Stockport County
- * Club domestic league appearances and goals

Jimmy McNulty (born 13 February 1985) is a football manager and former player who played as a centre-back. He is currently the head coach of EFL League One club Stockport County.

== Career ==
Born in Runcorn, Cheshire, McNulty had trials at both Liverpool and Everton as a schoolboy before choosing to join the latter's academy set-up. McNulty then signed for Wrexham after being released. After several years at Wrexham, he became their reserve team captain. However, he made only one senior appearance for the team as a substitute for Steve Roberts against Stockport County in the Football League Trophy on 5 November 2003; Wrexham lost the game in a 5–4 defeat. In February and March 2004, after leaving Wrexham, McNulty spent five matches at Bangor City in the League of Wales. He joined another League of Wales side, Caernarfon Town, in summer 2004. He made 63 appearances for the club over two seasons, scoring twice, whilst also reaching the position of captain.

In July 2006 McNulty signed for League Two club Macclesfield Town. On 21 November his first goal for the club sealed a 1–0 win in a FA Cup 1st Round replay against Walsall at the Bescot Stadium. On 29 November it was announced that McNulty had broken his leg and would be out of action for several months. Upon his return to the side he scored his first league goal in a 2–2 draw with Barnet.

On 2 January 2008 McNulty signed an eighteen-month contract with fellow League Two side Stockport County, after rejecting a new contract at Macclesfield. McNulty scored his first Stockport goal at Leyton Orient on 13 September and went on to captain Stockport on several occasions. He played as a central defender for Stockport as they won promotion with a 3–2 play-off victory over Rochdale at Wembley.

During the January 2009 transfer window, McNulty attracted attention as Stockport looked to bring in money to solve financial difficulties. Stockport accepted an undisclosed offer from Brighton & Hove Albion, allowing McNulty to open contract negotiations with the club, however he refused the opportunity on 22 January, explaining that he did not wish to move to Brighton. On 31 January he was pulled out of the matchday squad for Stockport's game against Hereford after being given permission to talk to an unnamed team.

On 2 February, it was revealed that McNulty had a change of heart and agreed to join Brighton & Hove Albion, signing a 3 1/2-year contract.

After scoring on his debut against Peterborough, McNulty ruptured a kidney during Brighton's 4–0 home defeat to Crewe Alexandra on 28 February 2009, and the injury ruled him out of action for the foreseeable future. On 23 March, it was announced that McNulty had an operation to remove his right kidney and that he would be ruled out of action for approximately six months. McNulty made his first appearance for Brighton since suffering the horrendous injury in a 2–0 pre-season friendly victory at Scunthorpe United, coming on as a second-half substitute. McNulty made his competitive comeback for Brighton during the 1–0 defeat at Leyton Orient in the Football League Trophy competition on 6 October 2009. After making another 10 competitive appearances since his horrific injury, the last being in the 3–2 defeat to Aston Villa in the FA Cup during January 2010, McNulty was allowed to join Championship side Scunthorpe United on an initial one-month loan to furthermore help his comeback to professional football by manager Gus Poyet. During his short spell at Glanford Park, McNulty made 3 appearances before returning to Brighton at the conclusion of the Championship season.

During July 2010, he re-signed for Scunthorpe on a further six months' loan deal, however after suffering an ankle injury requiring surgery, McNulty returned to Brighton on 5 December 2010.

On 24 June 2011, McNulty signed for Championship side Barnsley on a two-year contract. He was voted Players player of the year in his first season at Barnsley. The following season Barnsley manager Keith Hill announced McNulty as the new team captain.

On 3 October 2013, McNulty moved on a loan deal to Tranmere Rovers.

On 17 January 2014, McNulty had his contract at Barnsley cancelled by mutual consent. Hours after announcing he left Barnsley, McNulty signed an 18-month deal for Bury where he will be re-united with boss David Flitcroft.

On 2 June 2015, McNulty signed for Rochdale on a two-year contract. On 26 June 2021, McNulty signed a one-year contract extension.

== Managerial career ==
In August 2022, McNulty was appointed caretaker manager, following the dismissal of Robbie Stockdale. He had another spell as Rochdale's interim manager following the sacking of Stockdale's successor Jim Bentley in March 2023, winning his first two games in charge, away at AFC Wimbledon on 1 April, and at home against Walsall on 7 April 2023. Following the club's relegation, McNulty was appointed manager on a two-year contract on 12 May 2023.

Following a strong start to the 2025–26 season, McNulty was named National League Manager of the Month for August 2025 having led his side to five victories from their first six matches.

On 10 May 2026, McNulty's Rochdale side were promoted to League Two via the National League Playoffs, defeating Boreham Wood 3–1 on penalties following a 2–2 draw after extra time. On 5 June 2026, weeks after securing promotion, McNulty departed Rochdale to return to his former club Stockport County as head coach.

== Career statistics ==
As of match played 28 January 2023

Appearances and goals by club, season and competition
Club	Season	League			FA Cup		League Cup		Other		Total	
Club	Season	Division	Apps	Goals	Apps	Goals	Apps	Goals	Apps	Goals	Apps	Goals
Wrexham	2003–04	Second Division	0	0	0	0	0	0	1 (Note: Appearance(s) in Football League Trophy)	0	1	0
Macclesfield Town	2006–07	League Two	15	0	2	1	1	0	1	0	19	1
Macclesfield Town	2007–08	League Two	19	1	1	0	0	0	1	0	21	1
Macclesfield Town	Total		34	1	3	1	1	0	2	0	40	2
Stockport County	2007–08	League Two	13	0	0	0	0	0	1 (Note: Appearance(s) in League Two play-offs)	0	14	0
Stockport County	2008–09	League One	26	1	3	0	1	0	2	0	32	1
Stockport County	Total		39	1	3	0	1	0	3	0	46	1
Brighton & Hove Albion	2008–09	League One	5	1	0	0	0	0	0	0	5	1
Brighton & Hove Albion	2009–10	League One	8	0	2	0	0	0	1	0	11	0
Brighton & Hove Albion	2010–11	League One	0	0	0	0	0	0	0	0	0	0
Brighton & Hove Albion	Total		13	1	2	0	0	0	1	0	16	1
Scunthorpe United (loan)	2009–10	Championship	3	0	0	0	0	0	0	0	3	0
Scunthorpe United (loan)	2010–11	Championship	6	0	0	0	1	0	0	0	7	0
Barnsley	2011–12	Championship	44	2	1	0	1	0	0	0	46	2
Barnsley	2012–13	Championship	12	0	1	0	1	0	0	0	14	0
Barnsley	2013–14	Championship	0	0	0	0	1	0	0	0	1	0
Barnsley	Total		56	2	2	0	3	0	0	0	61	2
Tranmere Rovers (loan)	2013–14	League One	12	0	2	0	0	0	0	0	14	0
Bury	2013–14	League Two	21	0	0	0	0	0	0	0	21	0
Bury	2014–15	League Two	25	0	3	0	1	1	1	0	30	1
Bury	Total		46	0	3	0	1	1	1	0	51	1
Rochdale	2015–16	League One	46	0	2	0	2	0	2	0	52	0
Rochdale	2016–17	League One	35	0	5	0	2	0	2 (Note: Appearance(s) in EFL Trophy)	0	44	0
Rochdale	2017–18	League One	40	1	6	0	1	0	2	0	49	1
Rochdale	2018–19	League One	25	1	0	0	1	0	3	2	29	3
Rochdale	2019–20	League One	14	0	0	0	2	0	1	0	17	0
Rochdale	2020–21	League One	17	0	1	0	1	0	3	0	22	0
Rochdale	2021–22	League Two	12	0	0	0	0	0	2	0	14	0
Rochdale	2022–23	League Two	8	0	0	0	0	0	2	0	10	0
Rochdale	Total		197	2	14	0	9	0	17	2	237	4
Career total			406	7	29	1	16	1	25	2	476	11

== Managerial statistics ==
As of 21 November 2026

Managerial record by team and tenure
Team	From	To	Record					Ref.
Team	From	To	P	W	D	L	Win %	Ref.
Rochdale (caretaker)	19 August 2022	29 August 2022	3	0	1	2	0.0	
Rochdale	27 March 2023	5 June 2026	169	83	40	46	49.1	
Stockport County	5 June 2026	Present	21	13	4	4	61.9	
Total			193	96	45	52	49.7	

== Honours ==
=== As a player ===
Stockport County

- Football League Two play-offs: 2008

=== As a manager ===
Rochdale

- National League play-offs: 2026

Individual

- National League Manager of the Month: August 2025
