= Martyn Woolford =

English footballer (born 1985)

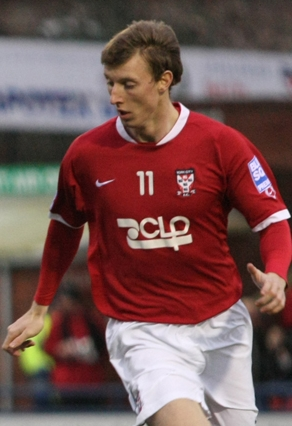
- Woolford playing for York City in 2007

Personal information
- Full name: Martyn Paul Woolford
- Date of birth: 13 October 1985 (age 41)
- Place of birth: Castleford, England
- Height: 6 ft 0 in (1.83 m)
- Position: Midfielder

Youth career
- –2002: Glasshoughton Welfare

Senior career*
Years	Team	Apps	(Gls)
2002–2005	Glasshoughton Welfare		
2005–2006	Frickley Athletic	44	(13)
2006–2008	York City	86	(22)
2008–2011	Scunthorpe United	103	(15)
2011–2013	Bristol City	55	(4)
2013–2015	Millwall	93	(11)
2015–2016	Sheffield United	28	(1)
2016–2017	Fleetwood Town	9	(1)
2017–2019	Grimsby Town	66	(5)
2019	Hyde United	5	(0)
2019–2020	Boston United	15	(0)
2020–2021	Gainsborough Trinity	6	(1)
2021	Frickley Athletic	8	(0)
2025–2026	Frickley Athletic	28	(3)

International career
2008	England C	2	(0)

Managerial career
- 2025–2026: Frickley Athletic
- * Club domestic league appearances and goals

Martyn Paul Woolford (born 13 October 1985) is an English football manager and former professional footballer who played as a midfielder. He has played in the Football League for Scunthorpe United, Bristol City, Millwall, Sheffield United, Fleetwood Town and Grimsby Town.

Woolford started his career in the Northern Counties East Football League Premier Division with Glasshoughton Welfare after progressing through their youth system. After three seasons at Glasshoughton, he moved to the Northern Premier League Premier Division with Frickley Athletic and scored 14 goals during the 2005–06 season. He joined York City in the Conference National in 2006 and spent two seasons with the club, being joint top scorer with 17 goals in the second season. He moved to League One team Scunthorpe United in 2008 and featured in the 2009 Football League Trophy Final before scoring the winning goal in the 2009 League One play-off final against Millwall.

After a season-and-a-half of playing Championship football with Scunthorpe, he signed for their divisional rivals Bristol City in 2013. Two years later he signed for another Championship club, Millwall, but was released after their relegation to League One in 2015. He joined League One club Sheffield United, where he played one season before joining their divisional rivals Fleetwood Town. He played for the England C team, who represent England at non-League level, in 2008, earning two caps. He made his debut against Grenada and earned his second and final cap against India.

== Early life ==
Woolford was born in Castleford, West Yorkshire. He comes from a family of professional sportsmen; father Neil and grandfather Cyril were both rugby league players with Featherstone Rovers. He has cited his father's encouragement as the main influence in his football career. He grew up supporting Manchester United.

== Playing career ==
=== Early career ===
Woolford started his career with Northern Counties East Football League Premier Division team Glasshoughton Welfare in 2002 after progressing through their youth system. Following the end of the 2002–03 season, he was given the award for the club's Most Improved Player, and early into 2003–04, he established himself as an "emerging talent". He played one match for the youth team of Doncaster Rovers in April 2005, but was not taken on by the club, and was also rejected by Barnsley and Bradford City. After three seasons at Glasshoughton, he joined Northern Premier League Premier Division club Frickley Athletic in August 2005, having impressed during several pre-season matches. He was awarded an FA contract running to the end of 2005–06 in October, with the option of another year. He made 40 league appearances and scored 12 goals for Frickley in 2005–06, with 14 goals in all competitions, after which the club exercised their option to extend his contract for another season.

=== York City ===
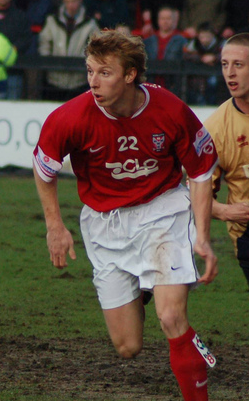
Woolford playing for York City in 2007

He had a trial with Stockport County of League Two during their pre-season trip to Ibiza in August 2006, but was not offered a contract. He was being tracked by Hartlepool United and York City, and also attracted interest from Guiseley. He eventually signed for Conference National club York on 31 August for an undisclosed five-figure fee after having made four appearances and scored one goal for Frickley at that point in 2006–07. He made his debut a day later in a 0–0 draw with Stafford Rangers after coming on as a 57th minute substitute. During his first start for the team, he was substituted for goalkeeper Arran Reid in the 17th minute after Tom Evans was sent off. He scored his first goal for York in the team's 3–2 home loss to Morecambe on 12 September. A week later, he scored both York's goals in a 2–1 away victory over Woking. He featured in both legs of York's play-off semi-final defeat by Morecambe 2–1 on aggregate and finished 2006–07 with 45 appearances and eight goals, after which the club exercised their option to extend his contract for another season.

He signed a new contract with York in October 2007, which would expire in the summer of 2009. He played in a more central position behind the strikers in 2007–08. He scored two goals in two minutes against Altrincham on 19 January 2008, which earned York a 2–2 draw, during which he played as a striker. Manager Colin Walker confirmed that several enquiries had been made about signing Woolford during the January transfer window. Woolford was set a 20-goal target by Walker in April 2008, at which point he had scored 16 goals. He was watched by Crewe Alexandra's director of football Dario Gradi in April 2008, after which Walker insisted he was still a part of York's plans for the next season. He finished 2007–08 with 57 appearances and 17 goals. He rejected speculation linking him with a move away from York in June, saying he would only move to a club two divisions higher.

=== Scunthorpe United ===
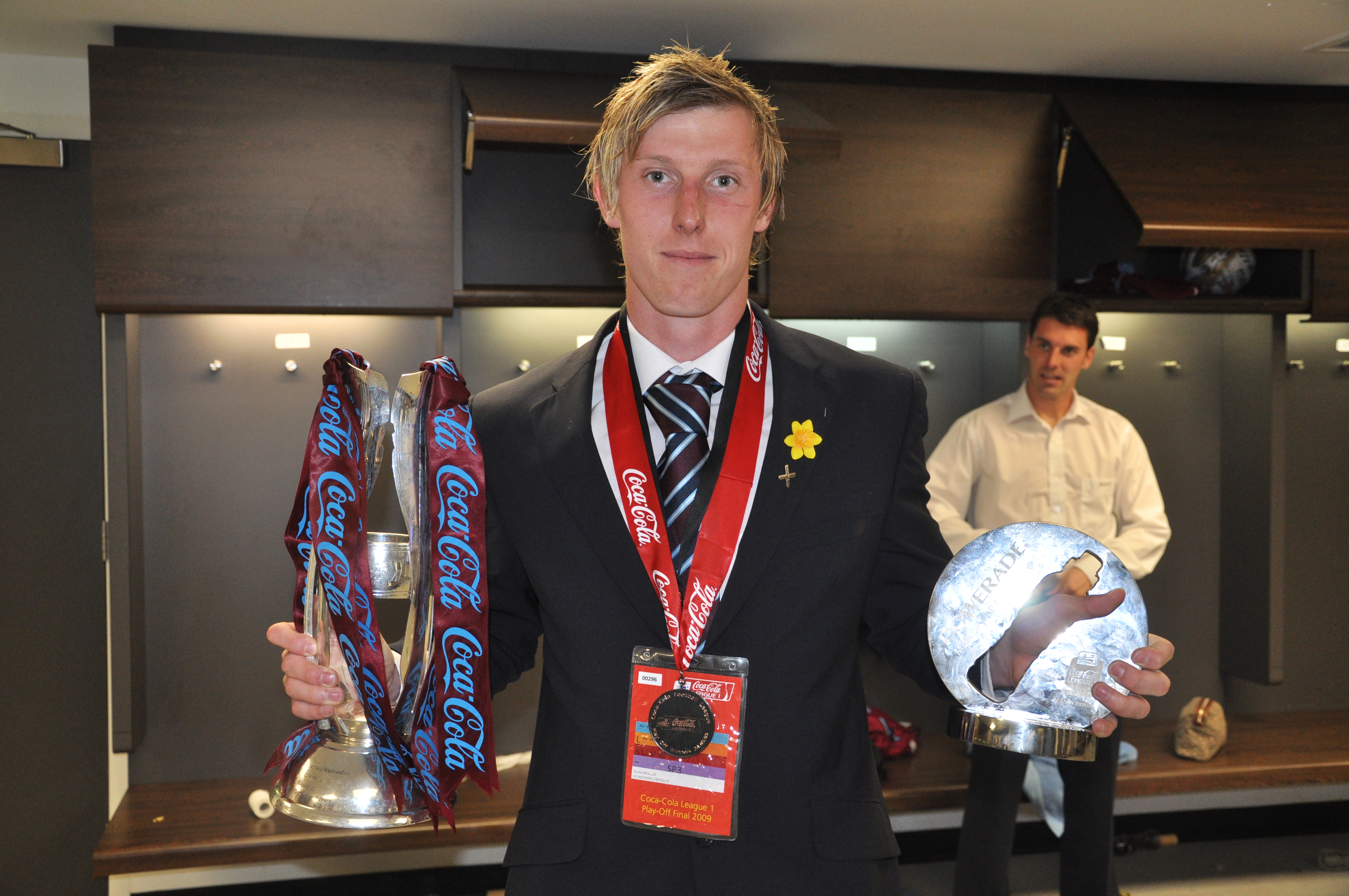
Woolford after Scunthorpe United's victory in the 2009 League One play-off final

Woolford rejected a new contract with York during the summer of 2008, with Cheltenham Town and another club believed to be interested in signing him. He eventually joined League One club Scunthorpe United for an undisclosed fee on a three-year contract on 8 August 2008, with the fee believed to be a six-figure fee with a sell-on clause. He made his Football League debut as an 87th-minute substitute in a 1–0 victory against Peterborough United on 23 August 2008. He scored four minutes into his first start for Scunthorpe against Brighton & Hove Albion on 6 September 2008, giving his team the lead, in a match which eventually finished 4–1. He came on as a 77th-minute substitute for Scunthorpe in the 2009 Football League Trophy Final on 5 April 2009, which was lost 3–2 to League Two team Luton Town after extra time. Scunthorpe made it to the play-offs and Woolford scored in the semi-final first leg against MK Dons, before scoring the winning goal for Scunthorpe in the 2009 League One play-off final against Millwall on 24 May 2009, with a goal in the 85th minute that gave the team a 3–2 victory, and also assisting the other two goals. This resulted in promotion to the Championship for Scunthorpe and he was named man of the match.

His first appearance of 2009–10 was in a 4–0 defeat at Cardiff City on 8 August 2009. He scored the winning goal for Scunthorpe against Derby County on 15 August 2009, which finished as a 3–2 victory. Woolford scored two goals against Newcastle United on 20 October 2009 to give Scunthorpe a 2–1 victory. He finished the season with 46 appearances and five goals.

Woolford started 2010–11 after playing in a 2–1 victory at Reading on 7 August 2010 and his first goal of the season was the winner in the 83rd minute of a 2–1 victory over League One team Oldham Athletic in the League Cup on 10 August.

=== Bristol City and Millwall ===
Woolford signed a three-and-a-half-year contract with fellow Championship club Bristol City after joining for an undisclosed fee on 31 January 2011. He made his debut in a 4–0 victory at Preston North End on 5 February 2011, in which he assisted a Brett Pitman goal.

Woolford signed a two-and-a-half-year contract with Championship club Millwall on 9 January 2013. He made his debut after starting in a 1–1 draw away to Bolton Wanderers on 12 January 2013. Woolford was released by Millwall on 7 May 2015 after their relegation to League One, having made 40 appearances and scored three goals in 2014–15.

=== Sheffield United, Fleetwood Town and Grimsby Town ===
Woolford signed a two-year contract with League One club Sheffield United on 14 July 2015, having previously played under manager Nigel Adkins at Scunthorpe. He was released by United on 19 August 2016, having fallen out of favour under manager Chris Wilder, and immediately joined League One club Fleetwood Town on a one-year contract. He was released at the end of 2016–17.

On 31 August 2017, Woolford signed a one-year contract with League Two club Grimsby Town on a free transfer. He made his debut two days later, starting in a 1–0 home win over Crewe Alexandra, in which he was substituted in the 69th minute. He was offered a new contract by Grimsby at the end of the 2017–18 season. He was released by Grimsby at the end of the 2018–19 season.

=== Later career ===
Woolford signed for Northern Premier League Premier Division club Hyde United on 15 August 2019. He signed for National League North club Boston United on 9 October. In July 2020 he signed for Gainsborough Trinity of the Northern Premier League.

=== Frickley Athletic ===
In June 2021, Woolford returned to Frickley Athletic ahead of the 2021/22 season. After eight appearances and no goals, Woolford retired from playing following an injury.

He returned to the club in July 2025. He made his third debut for the club in an FA Cup game away at Brighouse Town in August, completing the full ninety minutes in a 1-0 defeat.

== International career ==
Woolford was placed on standby for the England C team for their 2007–09 International Challenge Trophy match against Wales in February 2008. He was called into the squad in May for two matches in the Caribbean after an injury to Dean Moxey. His debut came in a 1–1 draw with Grenada on 31 May 2008 and was described as a "constant threat down the left", and earned his second cap as a 67th-minute substitute against Barbados on 2 June.

== Managerial career ==
=== Frickley Athletic ===
In September 2025, Woolford was appointed caretaker manager of Frickley Athletic following the dismissal of Tom Claisse, winning his first game in charge 1-0 against SJR Worksop in the Sheffield Senior Cup. In October 2025, Woolford was appointed the club's permanent manager.

Following a difficult start to the 2026/27 season, Woolford was dismissed as first-team manager after a 9-0 defeat to F.C. St Helens.

== Style of play ==
Woolford plays as a left winger, where he has been described as being "fleetfooted". He is versatile and has also played as a wing-back, left midfielder and a striker and has also been used in a more "roaming, attacking role" to offer support to a lone striker.

== Personal life ==
Woolford was studying for a degree in civil engineering at Leeds Metropolitan University while playing for Frickley and a degree in surveying in 2006. While at university, he worked on a building site. He achieved a Higher National Diploma in civil engineering and has said he is looking to complete this degree before the end of his football career.

== Career statistics ==
As of match played 7 March 2020

Appearances and goals by club, season and competition
Club	Season	League			FA Cup		League Cup		Other		Total	
Club	Season	Division	Apps	Goals	Apps	Goals	Apps	Goals	Apps	Goals	Apps	Goals
Frickley Athletic	2005–06	Northern Premier League; Premier Division	40	12	0	0	—		1 (Note: Appearance in Northern Premier League Premier Division play-offs)	0	41	12
Frickley Athletic	2006–07	Northern Premier League; Premier Division	4	1	—		—		—		4	1
Frickley Athletic	Total		44	13	0	0	—		1	0	45	13
York City	2006–07	Conference National	40	8	2	0	—		3 (Note: One appearance in FA Trophy, two in Conference National play-offs)	0	45	8
York City	2007–08	Conference Premier	46	14	2	0	—		9 (Note: Seven appearances and two goals in FA Trophy, two appearances and one goal in Conference League Cup)	3	57	17
York City	Total		86	22	4	0	—		12	3	102	25
Scunthorpe United	2008–09	League One	39	4	3	0	0	0	10 (Note: Seven appearances and one goal in Football League Trophy, three appearances and two goals in League One play-offs)	3	52	7
Scunthorpe United	2009–10	Championship	40	5	2	0	4	0	—		46	5
Scunthorpe United	2010–11	Championship	24	6	1	0	2	2	—		27	8
Scunthorpe United	Total		103	15	6	0	6	2	10	3	125	20
Bristol City	2010–11	Championship	15	0	—		—		—		15	0
Bristol City	2011–12	Championship	25	1	1	0	1	0	—		27	1
Bristol City	2012–13	Championship	15	3	1	0	1	0	—		17	3
Bristol City	Total		55	4	2	0	2	0	—		59	4
Millwall	2012–13	Championship	15	1	—		—		—		15	1
Millwall	2013–14	Championship	40	7	1	1	2	1	—		43	9
Millwall	2014–15	Championship	38	3	2	0	0	0	—		40	3
Millwall	Total		93	11	3	1	2	1	—		98	13
Sheffield United	2015–16	League One	28	1	1	0	2	0	3 (Note: Appearances in Football League Trophy)	0	34	1
Sheffield United	2016–17	League One	0	0	—		0	0	—		0	0
Sheffield United	Total		28	1	1	0	2	0	3	0	34	1
Fleetwood Town	2016–17	League One	9	1	1	0	—		3 (Note: Appearance(s) in EFL Trophy)	0	13	1
Grimsby Town	2017–18	League Two	31	2	1	0	—		1	0	33	2
Grimsby Town	2018–19	League Two	35	3	2	0	1	0	2	0	40	3
Grimsby Town	Total		66	5	3	0	1	0	3	0	73	5
Hyde United	2019–20	Northern Premier League; Premier Division	5	0	0	0	—		0	0	5	0
Boston United	2019–20	National League North	15	0	3	0	—		0	0	18	0
Career total			504	72	23	1	13	3	32	6	572	82

== Honours ==
Scunthorpe United

- Football League One play-offs: 2009
- Football League Trophy runner-up: 2008–09
