= Garry Thompson (footballer, born 1980) =

English footballer (born 1980)

Personal information
- Full name: Garry Kevin Langrish Thompson
- Date of birth: 24 November 1980 (age 45)
- Place of birth: Kendal, England
- Position: Winger

Youth career
- 1997–1999: Morecambe

Senior career*
Years	Team	Apps	(Gls)
1999–2008	Morecambe	294	(56)
2008–2012	Scunthorpe United	113	(20)
2012–2014	Bradford City	86	(8)
2014–2015	Notts County	41	(12)
2015–2017	Wycombe Wanderers	86	(11)
2017–2019	Morecambe	45	(3)
2019	Workington	0	(0)
2019	Bradford (Park Avenue)	0	(0)
2019	Penrith		

Managerial career
- 2019: Bradford (Park Avenue) (player-manager)
- * Club domestic league appearances and goals

Garry Kevin Langrish Thompson (born 24 November 1980) is an English football coach and former player who was last manager of Bradford (Park Avenue).

== Playing career ==
Born in Kendal, Cumbria, Thompson scored Morecambe's first goal in the Conference play-off Final against Exeter City in May 2007.

In January 2008, Morecambe turned down a £10,000 offer from Bradford City for Thompson. Instead he agreed to sign for Scunthorpe United on a three-year contract on 27 May 2008 on a free transfer, joining on 1 July.

He was released by the club in May 2012. Thompson signed a one-year contract with Bradford City on 4 July 2012. He made his debut on 11 August in the League Cup during a 1–0 win against Notts County. He then made his league debut a week later against Gillingham. He made his home debut on 21 August in a 1–0 win against Fleetwood Town, coming on as a substitute for Zavon Hines. On 28 August, he scored his first goal for the club, scoring an injury-time winner in a 2–1 win in the League Cup against Watford. On 11 December, he helped Bradford to the semi-finals of the League Cup by scoring against Arsenal. He scored his first league goal for the club on 26 December in a 2–1 win at home to Accrington Stanley. On 2 May 2013, he scored in the first leg of the play-off semi-final against Burton Albion. In the final, he assisted goals from both Nahki Wells and James Hanson as Bradford beat Northampton Town 3–0 and secured promotion to League One.

On 23 July 2014, Garry Thompson signed for Notts County. After one season with County, he joined Wycombe Wanderers on a two-year deal. He scored in the 83rd minute of Wycombe's FA Cup fourth round match against Tottenham Hotspur on 28 January 2017 after heading in Myles Weston's cross to give Wycombe a 3–2 lead, although Wycombe went on to lose the match 4–3. At the end of the 2016–17 season, Thompson left Wycombe Wanderers after his contract was not renewed.

Thompson re-signed for Morecambe on 28 June 2017, after 9 years away from the club. He had remained in close contact with his former teammate Jim Bentley, who is the manager of Morecambe. Thompson made his second competitive debut in the opening game of the new season, a 2–1 win over Cheltenham Town. Thompson scored both goals to complete the comeback, including a last minute winner.

In January 2019, he was released by Morecambe and joined Northern Premier League club Workington.

After a short spell with Penrith FC, 39-year old Thompson decided to hangs up his boots on 9 December 2019.

== Coaching career ==
In May 2019 he became player-manager of Bradford (Park Avenue). However, he was sacked after just two league games, having lost both of them 5–0, on 8 August 2019.

== Career statistics ==
As of match played 21 April 2018

Appearances and goals by club, season and competition
Club	Season	League			FA Cup		League Cup		Other		Total	
Club	Season	Division	Apps	Goals	Apps	Goals	Apps	Goals	Apps	Goals	Apps	Goals
Morecambe	1999–2000	Conference Premier	22	1	0	0	–		0	0	22	1
Morecambe	2000–01	Conference Premier	17	4	3	1	–		3 (Note: One appearance in FA Trophy, one in Football League Trophy and one in Conference League Cup)	0	23	5
Morecambe	2001–02	Conference Premier	28	7	1	0	–		3 (Note: Appearances in FA Trophy)	1	32	8
Morecambe	2002–03	Conference Premier	37	5	3	1	–		1	0	41	6
Morecambe	2003–04	Conference Premier	36	6	1	0	–		0	0	37	6
Morecambe	2004–05	Conference Premier	36	5	1	0	–		1	0	38	5
Morecambe	2005–06	Conference Premier	41	9	1	0	–		2 (Note: Appearances in Conference Premier play-offs)	0	44	9
Morecambe	2006–07	Conference Premier	37	12	2	0	–		2	1	41	13
Morecambe	2007–08	League Two	40	7	1	0	3	1	3 (Note: Appearances in Football League Trophy)	0	47	8
Morecambe	Total		294	56	13	2	3	1	15	2	325	61
Scunthorpe United	2008–09	League One	26	3	2	0	1	0	3	0	32	3
Scunthorpe United	2009–10	Championship	36	9	2	0	2	0	–		40	9
Scunthorpe United	2010–11	Championship	12	1	0	0	1	0	–		13	1
Scunthorpe United	2011–12	League One	39	7	2	0	2	0	2	0	45	7
Scunthorpe United	Total		113	20	6	0	6	0	5	0	130	20
Bradford City	2012–13	League Two	42	6	3	0	6	2	5 (Note: Two appearances in the Football League Trophy and three in the League Two play-offs)	1	56	9
Bradford City	2013–14	League One	44	2	0	0	1	0	1	0	46	2
Bradford City	Total		86	8	3	0	7	2	6	1	102	11
Notts County	2014–15	League One	41	12	2	0	0	0	3	0	46	12
Wycombe Wanderers	2015–16	League Two	43	7	4	1	1	0	1	0	49	8
Wycombe Wanderers	2016–17	League Two	43	4	2	1	1	0	5	2	51	7
Wycombe Wanderers	Total		86	11	6	2	2	0	6	2	100	15
Morecambe	2017–18	League Two	40	3	0	0	1	0	1	0	42	3
Career total			660	110	30	4	19	3	36	5	745	122

== Honours ==
Scunthorpe United

- Football League One play-offs: 2009

Bradford City

- Football League Two play-offs: 2013
- Football League Cup runner-up: 2012–13
