= Sam Slocombe =

English footballer

Personal information
- Full name: Sam Oliver Slocombe
- Date of birth: 5 June 1988 (age 38)
- Place of birth: Scunthorpe, England
- Height: 6 ft 0 in (1.83 m)
- Position: Goalkeeper

Team information
- Current team: Notts County (first-team coach)

Senior career*
Years	Team	Apps	(Gls)
–2008	Bottesford Town		
2008–2015	Scunthorpe United	115	(0)
2015–2016	Oxford United	23	(0)
2016–2017	Blackpool	34	(0)
2017–2019	Bristol Rovers	25	(0)
2018–2019	→ Lincoln City (loan)	0	(0)
2019–2025	Notts County	147	(0)
Total		344	(0)
- * Club domestic league appearances and goals as of 20:21, 23 June 2025 (UTC)

Sam Oliver Slocombe (born 5 June 1988) is an English former professional footballer who played as a goalkeeper. He is currently a first-team coach at Notts County.

He began his career with Bottesford Town in the Northern Counties East Football League. In 2008, he moved to his hometown club Scunthorpe United. Slocombe had made over 130 appearances for Scunthorpe and was the club's longest-serving player, before being released by them in 2015.

== Career ==
=== Scunthorpe United ===
Slocombe was born in Scunthorpe, Lincolnshire. On 15 August 2008, he signed with League One side Scunthorpe United from Bottesford Town for £3,000 and a pre-season friendly. He made his first team debut on 22 September 2009, in a League Cup clash with Port Vale, replacing Joe Murphy, following a 25th minute injury to Murphy. He made his league debut in the Championship match against Blackpool on 7 November 2009, replacing Michael O'Connor after Murphy was sent off for deliberate handball. On 5 May 2015 it was announced that Slocombe wouldn't be offered a new deal and was free to leave the club.

=== Oxford United ===
Slocombe signed for Oxford United, then in League Two, on a two-year contract on 12 June 2015 which was announced by two young fans called Ben and Daniel Mathews.

=== Blackpool ===
On 19 July 2016, shortly after leaving Oxford United by mutual consent, Slocombe signed a one-year deal with League Two club Blackpool. His contract has an option of a further twelve months.

=== Bristol Rovers ===
On 6 July 2017, after being released by Blackpool, Slocombe signed for Bristol Rovers on a free transfer. He was one of two keepers signed by Rovers on this day, with Adam Smith joining him. He made his debut in Rovers' third game of the season, a 3–2 victory away at Bury. On 21 August 2018, Slocombe joined League Two side Lincoln City on an initial seven-day emergency loan deal. His loan spell was terminated with Lincoln on 9 January 2019. Slocombe was one of 9 players who departed the club at the end of their contract at the end of the 2018–19 season.

=== Notts County ===
On 1 August 2019, Slocombe signed for National League side Notts County.

On 20 May 2025, Notts County said the player would be released in June when his contract expired.

== Coaching career ==
On 22 June 2025, Notts County announced that Slocombe would be remaining with the club in the role of first-team coach to the newly appointed Martin Paterson.

== Career statistics ==
As of end of 2024–25 season

Appearances and goals by club, season and competition
Club	Season	League			FA Cup		League Cup		Other		Total	
Club	Season	Division	Apps	Goals	Apps	Goals	Apps	Goals	Apps	Goals	Apps	Goals
Scunthorpe United	2008–09	League One	0	0	0	0	0	0	0	0	0	0
Scunthorpe United	2009–10	Championship	1	0	0	0	1	0	—		2	0
Scunthorpe United	2010–11	Championship	2	0	0	0	1	0	—		3	0
Scunthorpe United	2011–12	League One	28	0	2	0	0	0	—		30	0
Scunthorpe United	2012–13	League One	29	0	1	0	2	0	1 (Note: Appearance in Football League Trophy)	0	33	0
Scunthorpe United	2013–14	League Two	46	0	2	0	1	0	1	0	50	0
Scunthorpe United	2014–15	League One	9	0	5	0	1	0	—		15	0
Scunthorpe United	Total		115	0	10	0	6	0	2	0	133	0
Oxford United	2015–16	League Two	23	0	2	0	2	0	1	0	28	0
Blackpool	2016–17	League Two	34	0	5	0	2	0	5 (Note: Two appearances in the EFL Trophy and three in the League Two play-offs)	0	46	0
Bristol Rovers	2017–18	League One	23	0	0	0	2	0	2 (Note: Appearance(s) in the EFL Trophy)	0	27	0
Bristol Rovers	2018–19	League One	2	0	0	0	0	0	0	0	2	0
Bristol Rovers	Total		25	0	0	0	2	0	2	0	29	0
Lincoln City (loan)	2018–19	League Two	0	0	0	0	1	0	4	0	5	0
Notts County	2019–20	National League	29	0	3	0	—		3 (Note: One appearance in FA Trophy, two appearances in National League play-offs)	0	35	0
Notts County	2020–21	National League	37	0	0	0	—		4 (Note: Two appearances in FA Trophy, two appearances in National League play-offs)	0	41	0
Notts County	2021–22	National League	20	0	0	0	—		5 (Note: Four appearances in FA Trophy, one appearance in National League play-offs)	0	25	0
Notts County	2022–23	National League	39	0	0	0	—		2 (Note: Appearance(s) in National League play-offs)	0	41	0
Notts County	2023–24	League Two	14	0	0	0	1	0	2	0	17	0
Notts County	2024–25	League Two	8	0	0	0	1	0	3	0	12	0
Notts County	Total		147	0	3	0	2	0	19	0	171	0
Career total			344	0	20	0	15	0	33	0	413	0

== Honours ==
Scunthorpe United

- Football League Two second-place promotion: 2013–14

Oxford United

- Football League Trophy runner-up: 2015–16

Blackpool

- EFL League Two play-offs: 2017

Notts County

- National League play-offs: 2023
