= Cliff Byrne =

Irish former footballer

Personal information
- Full name: Clifford Byrne
- Date of birth: 26 April 1982 (age 44)
- Place of birth: Dublin, Ireland
- Height: 1.85 m (6 ft 1 in)
- Position: Centre back

Team information
- Current team: Doncaster Rovers (assistant manager)

Senior career*
Years	Team	Apps	(Gls)
1999–2003	Sunderland	0	(0)
2002–2003	→ Scunthorpe United (loan)	13	(0)
2003–2012	Scunthorpe United	263	(9)
2012–2014	Oldham Athletic	38	(1)
2013	→ Scunthorpe United (loan)	10	(0)
2014	Derry City	17	(1)
2014–2015	Alfreton Town	7	(1)
2015	Gainsborough Trinity	11	(1)
2023	Bottesford Town	5	(2)
Total		364	(15)

International career
2002–2003	Republic of Ireland U21	7	(0)
- * Club domestic league appearances and goals

Clifford Byrne (born 26 April 1982) is an Irish former footballer who played as a defender. He is currently assistant manager at EFL League One side Doncaster Rovers.

== Playing career ==
Byrne began his career with Sunderland. He signed for Scunthorpe United on loan in 2002. After a successful three-month loan spell concluded in February 2003, Scunthorpe manager Brian Laws described Byrne as his best ever loan signing, attempting to sign him on a permanent transfer for £50,000. Byrne initially turned down the move in order to fight for his place at Sunderland, but subsequently joined Scunthorpe after being released by Sunderland in the summer.

Following the departure of Izzy Iriekpen Byrne was given the captaincy of the side. He scored two goals in the last two games of the 2008–09 season; his 89th-minute goal against Tranmere Rovers was enough to help Scunthorpe seal the last playoff place. After missing just under a year of action due to injury, Byrne made his first start of the 2011–12 season on 26 November 2011, away to Notts County. He was released by the club in May 2012.

On 27 July 2012, it was announced that Byrne had signed for Oldham Athletic. Byrne scored his first goal for Oldham against his old club Scunthorpe United in a 2–2 draw on 1 January 2013 He rejoined former club Scunthorpe on loan in September 2013. On 17 January 2014, Cliff had his contract at Oldham Athletic cancelled by mutual agreement.

In February 2014, Byrne signed for Roddy Collins at the Brandywell Stadium to play for Derry City for the 2014 League of Ireland season. He scored his first League goal on his third league appearance.

On 19 February 2015, he joined Gainsborough Trinity.

In February 2023, Byrne rekindled his playing career, signing for Bottesford Town in the Northern Counties East Football League Premier Division.

== Coaching career ==
Byrne took part in a UEFA 'B' coaching course in summer 2005.

On 30 June 2018, he was appointed assistant manager to Grant McCann at Doncaster Rovers.

On 21 June 2019, he was appointed assistant manager again to Grant McCann, following his appointment as head coach at Hull City. Following the takeover of Hull City by Acun Medya, backed by Acun Ilıcalı on 19 January 2022, McCann and Byrne were sacked a few days later.

In February 2022, Byrne became assistant manager at Peterborough United, once again assisting McCann. The duo were sacked in January 2023.

In May 2023, Byrne was reappointed as assistant manager to McCann at Doncaster Rovers.

== Career statistics ==
Appearances and goals by club, season and competition
Club	Season	League			National cup		League cup		Other		Total	
Club	Season	Division	Apps	Goals	Apps	Goals	Apps	Goals	Apps	Goals	Apps	Goals
Sunderland	2002–03	Premier League	0	0	0	0	0	0	—		0	0
Scunthorpe United	2002–03 (Note: This season was spent on loan from Sunderland)	Division Three	13	0	3	0	0	0	0	0	16	0
Scunthorpe United	2003–04	Division Three	39	1	6	0	2	0	4 (Note: Appearances in Football League Trophy)	0	51	1
Scunthorpe United	2004–05	League Two	29	1	3	0	0	0	1	0	33	1
Scunthorpe United	2005–06	League One	32	1	4	0	1	0	3	0	40	1
Scunthorpe United	2006–07	League One	24	0	3	0	1	0	2	0	30	0
Scunthorpe United	2007–08	Championship	25	0	1	0	1	0	—		27	0
Scunthorpe United	2008–09	League One	43	2	3	0	1	0	10 (Note: Seven appearances in Football League Trophy; three appearances in League One play-offs)	0	57	2
Scunthorpe United	2009–10	Championship	36	2	2	0	2	0	—		40	2
Scunthorpe United	2010–11	Championship	21	2	0	0	3	0	—		24	2
Scunthorpe United	2011–12	League One	14	0	0	0	0	0	0	0	14	0
Scunthorpe United	Total		276	9	25	0	11	0	20	0	332	9
Oldham Athletic	2012–13	League One	35	1	3	0	1	0	1	0	40	1
Oldham Athletic	2013–14	League One	3	0	0	0	0	0	0	0	3	0
Oldham Athletic	Total		38	1	3	0	1	0	1	0	43	1
Scunthorpe United (loan)	2013–14	League Two	10	0	1	0	0	0	0	0	11	0
Derry City	2014	League of Ireland Premier Division	17	1	0	0	0	0	4 (Note: Appearances in UEFA Europa League)	0	21	1
Alfreton Town	2014–15	Conference Premier	7	1	0	0	—		1 (Note: Appearances in FA Trophy)	0	8	1
Gainsborough Trinity	2014–15	Conference North	11	1	0	0	—		0	0	11	1
Bottesford Town	2022–23	Northern Counties East League Premier Division	5	2	0	0	—		0	0	5	2
Career total			364	15	29	0	12	0	26	0	431	15

== Honours ==
Scunthorpe United

- Football League One: 2006–07; play-offs: 2009
- Football League Trophy runner-up: 2008–09
