= Sam Togwell =

English footballer (born 1984)

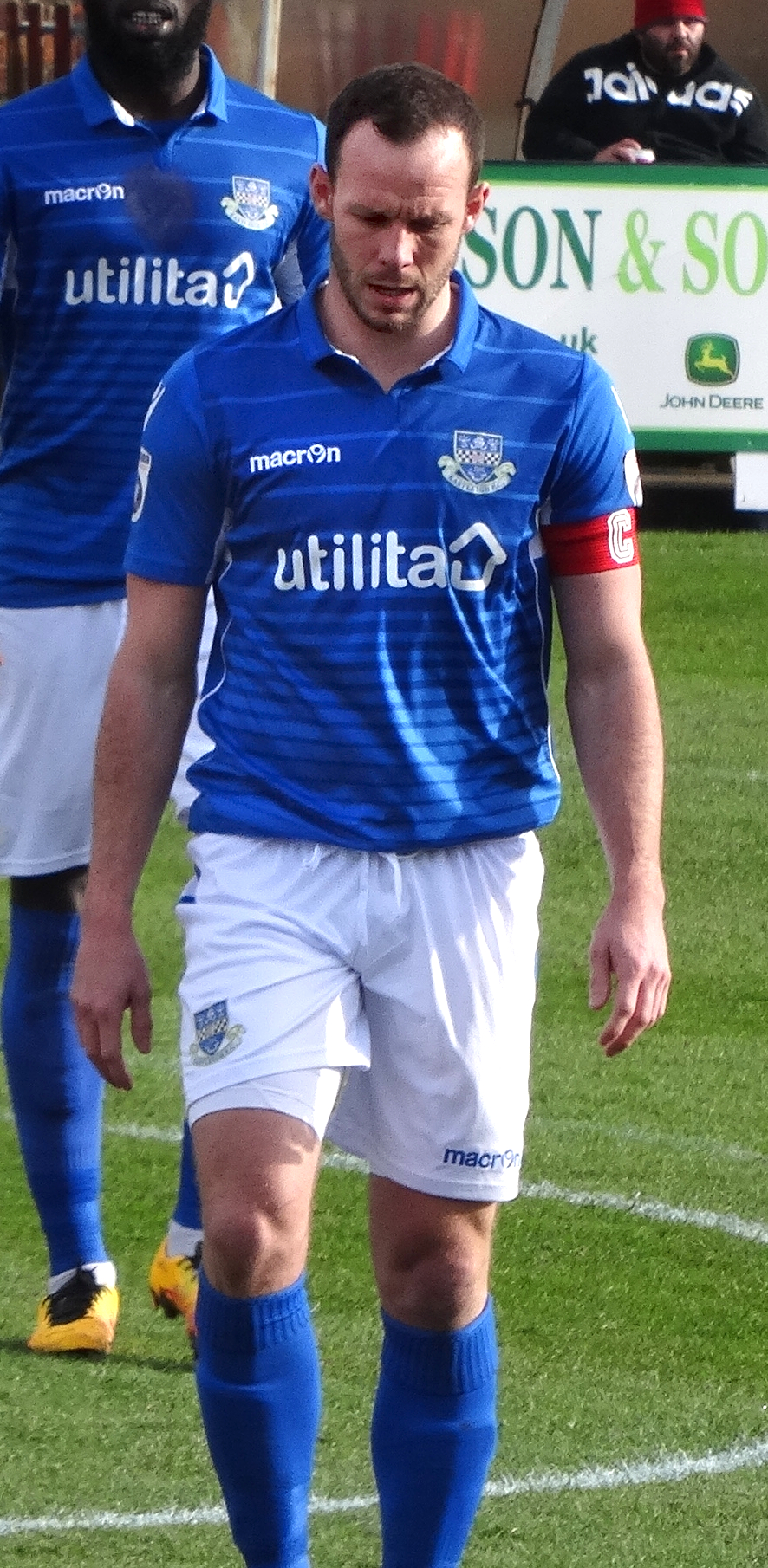
- Togwell playing for Eastleigh in 2017

Personal information
- Full name: Samuel James Togwell
- Date of birth: 14 October 1984 (age 42)
- Place of birth: Beaconsfield, England
- Height: 6 ft 0 in (1.83 m)
- Position: Midfielder

Team information
- Current team: Beaconsfield Town (manager)

Youth career
- 1994–2002: Crystal Palace

Senior career*
Years	Team	Apps	(Gls)
2002–2006	Crystal Palace	1	(0)
2004	→ Oxford United (loan)	4	(0)
2005	→ Northampton Town (loan)	9	(0)
2005–2006	→ Port Vale (loan)	27	(2)
2006–2008	Barnsley	66	(2)
2008–2012	Scunthorpe United	159	(5)
2012–2014	Chesterfield	55	(3)
2014	→ Wycombe Wanderers (loan)	4	(0)
2014–2016	Barnet	93	(1)
2016–2018	Eastleigh	45	(1)
2018–2021	Slough Town	86	(5)
2022–2024	Beaconsfield Town	58	(3)
Total		607	(22)

Managerial career
- 2024–: Beaconsfield Town
- * Club domestic league appearances and goals

Samuel James Togwell (born 14 October 1984) is an English football manager and former player who manages Southern League Division One Central club Beaconsfield Town.

Togwell was a midfielder. He began his career with Crystal Palace in 2002, where he was loaned out to Oxford United, Northampton Town, and Port Vale. In July 2006, he transferred to Barnsley, before he joined Scunthorpe United in August 2008. He helped the "Iron" to win promotion out of the League One play-offs in 2009. He signed with Chesterfield in July 2012 and became a key player in the 2012–13 season. He lost his first-team place the following season and was loaned to Wycombe Wanderers. He helped Chesterfield to win the League Two title in 2013–14. He signed with Barnet in August 2014 and helped the club to the Conference title in the 2014–15 season. He was sold to Eastleigh in December 2016 before joining Slough Town in June 2018. He retired in May 2021, having made 606 appearances in all competitions, scoring 23 goals. He came out of retirement the following year to play for Beaconsfield Town.

== Career ==
=== Crystal Palace ===
Togwell started in the Crystal Palace youth set-up at the age of ten, before making his senior debut as a 17-year-old substitute on 22 December 2002 at Millmoor. Palace beat Rotherham United 3–1, returning to London with three First Division points.

He did not get another game in the 2002–03 or 2003–04 seasons, mainly due to a broken leg he sustained in a reserve team match in February 2003. He returned to fitness in September 2003. Togwell joined League Two club Oxford United on loan on 22 October 2004. He made five appearances before returning to Selhurst Park the next month. He rejected a loan move to Norwegian club Viking FK, who were managed by Roy Hodgson. On 24 March 2005, he went back into the basement division to join Northampton Town on a one-month loan. He made eight appearances before his loan deal was extended to cover the play-offs. Southend United defeated the "Cobblers" in the semi-finals, before beating Lincoln City in the final.

Togwell, by now captain of the reserve team, played in the opening three rounds of the League Cup in 2005–06, including a 2–1 defeat of European Champions Liverpool in which he marked Steven Gerrard. On 10 November 2005, he joined League One club Port Vale on a six-week loan deal. He impressed at Vale Park, especially on 6 January when he scored both goals of a FA Cup Third round defeat of Doncaster Rovers. Having already had the loan extended once, Martin Foyle managed to extend the deal until the end of the season after Togwell played some excellent football in January, being named as supporters' player of the month. In March, Vale made Palace an offer, to sign the young midfielder permanently in the summer. The next month, with Togwell and Vale agreed on personal terms, chairman Bill Bratt admitted that the two clubs were a long way from agreeing a deal, with Palace demanding a large sum in transfer fees. The cash-strapped club were forced to abandon hope of signing Togwell after their £50,000 transfer bid was rejected, though handed him the club's "Young Player of The Year" award in recognition of his performances in his 30 games that season.

=== Barnsley ===
However, his tenure at Palace did not last much longer, as he left for Barnsley on 12 July 2006 for an undisclosed fee, which was later reported to be £60,000. Togwell made his League debut for Barnsley on 5 August 2006, in a 2–1 defeat at Cardiff City. He made 46 appearances in 2006–07, including both Championship clashes with former club Palace, both of which finished 2–0 for the home team. Battling with Bobby Hassell and new signing Anderson Silva de França for a first-team place, he found life tough at Oakwell the next season. In all, he played 27 games, three of which came in the club's impressive FA Cup run, including a substitute appearance in the memorable victory over Premier League team Chelsea.

=== Scunthorpe United ===
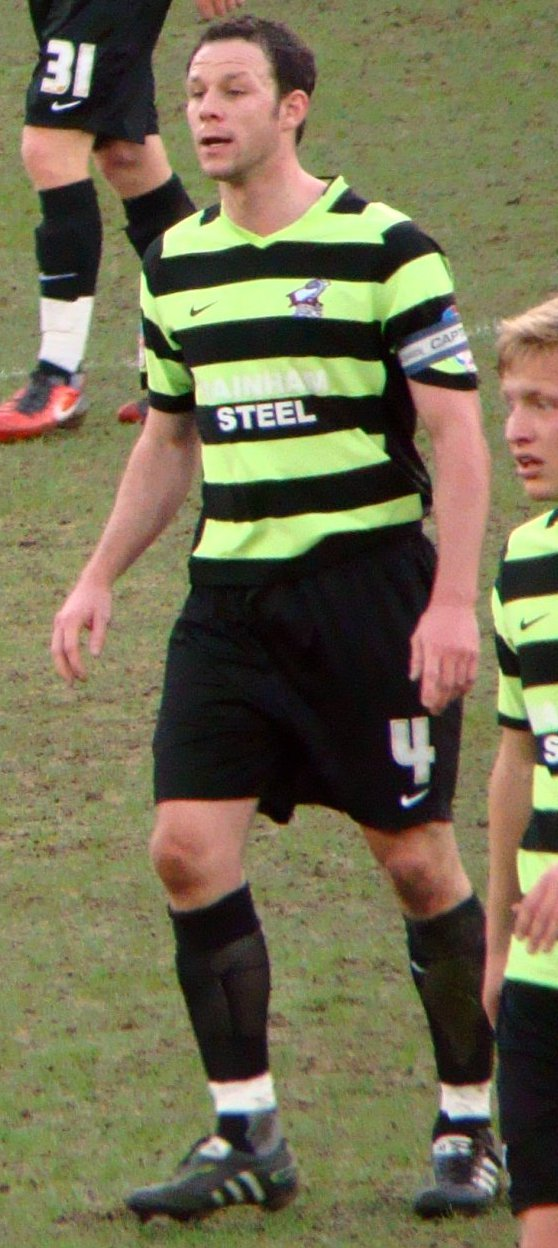
Togwell playing for Scunthorpe United in 2011

He joined Scunthorpe United on a free transfer in August 2008, signing a two-year deal. The young midfield battler was optimistic of the club's future, predicting promotion. His prophecy was fulfilled at Wembley, as the "Iron" defeated Millwall 3–2 in the play-off final. He remained a key member of Scunthorpe's first team in the Championship; making 47 appearances in 2009–10, he managed to bag a goal against his former employers at Selhurst Park in the process. Signing a new two-year deal in June 2010, Togwell recovered from a knee injury to make 40 appearances in the 2010–11 campaign. He was given the club's Player of the Year award, the Ernie Storey Memorial Trophy, however, he could not prevent the "Iron" from finishing in last place and thereby suffer relegation back into League One. He made 44 appearances in 2011–12, as Alan Knill led the Glanford Park club to an 18th-place finish in League One. However, he was one of ten players released by the club in May 2012.

=== Chesterfield ===
In July 2012, Togwell joined League Two club Chesterfield on a two-year contract. He made 50 appearances in the 2012–13 campaign. On 14 March 2014, Togwell joined fellow League Two club Wycombe Wanderers on a one-month loan deal. He made his debut for the "Chairboys" the next day in a 2–0 defeat to York City, and gave away a penalty before being sent off for two bookable offences. He returned from suspension to play three games for Wycombe before being recalled by Chesterfield on 9 April. He played a total of ten games for Chesterfield as the "Spireites" won promotion as divisional champions in 2013–14, and was released by manager Paul Cook in the summer.

=== Barnet ===
Togwell joined Barnet of the Conference Premier in August 2014. He missed just four league games of the 2014–15 season as Martin Allen's "Bees" won promotion back into the English Football League as champions of the Conference. He played 40 games in the 2015–16 season and signed a one-year contract extension in May. He underwent a hernia operation in October 2016, which kept him out of action for six weeks. In total he played 99 times for the Bees, scoring one goal.

=== Eastleigh ===
On 15 December 2016, Togwell joined National League club Eastleigh for a fee of £20,000. He signed an 18-month contract; the move reunited him with former Barnet manager Martin Allen. He was appointed as club captain one month later following the departure of Joe Partington. However, he endured a difficult 2017–18 campaign, which started badly as he was ruled out for the first half of the season after picking up a thigh injury in August. By the time he recovered to full fitness manager Richard Hill had been replaced by Andy Hessenthaler, who opted to release Togwell at the end of the campaign.

=== Slough Town ===
Togwell joined newly promoted National League South club Slough Town in June 2018, where he joined up with his brother Lee. As well as playing together, the brothers also ran a personal training business together. He scored three goals in 44 matches in the 2018–19 season, helping the "Rebels" to reach the second round of the FA Cup, where they were beaten by Gillingham. Slough beat Reading Under-23s 3–1 in the 2019 Berks & Bucks Senior Cup final, with Togwell scoring a brace and his brother scoring the other goal. He scored two goals in 34 games during the 2019–20 season, helping Slough to qualify for the play-off quarter-finals, where they were beaten 3–0 by Dartford. He made 13 appearances before the 2020–21 season was curtailed early due to the COVID-19 pandemic in England. He announced his retirement in May 2021.

=== Beaconsfield Town ===
Togwell came out of retirement to play for Southern League Premier Division South club Beaconsfield Town in the 2022–23 season. He made 49 appearances throughout the campaign, scoring two goals. He added another 20 appearances to his name in the 2023–24 season. He went on to become the club's assistant manager and was appointed interim manager in October 2024 after manager Garry Haylock left the club. Togwell won two of six games in charge before being given the job on a permanent basis. Beaconsfield ended the 2024–25 campaign in 11th place and Togwell signed to stay for another season. They finished the 2025–26 season in 11th place.

== Career statistics ==
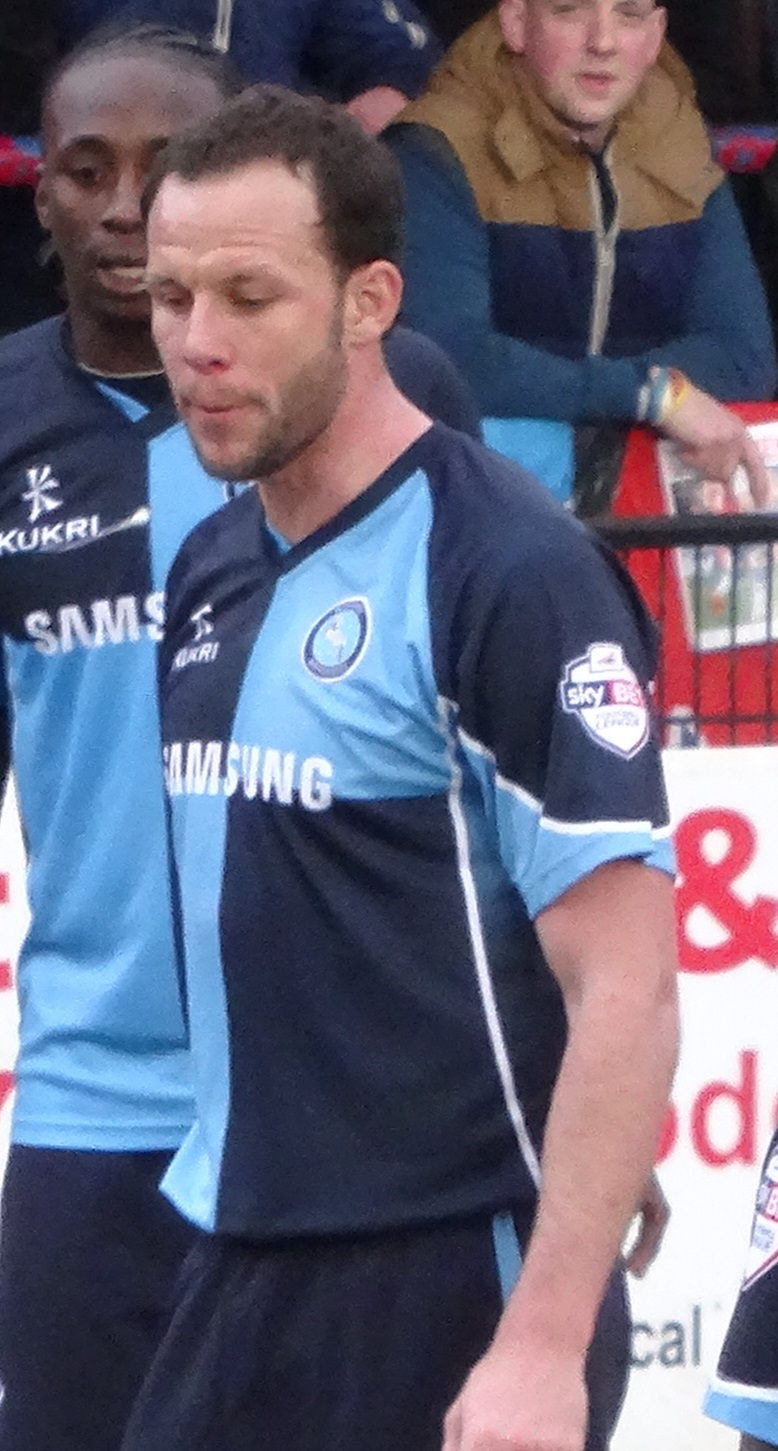
Togwell playing for Wycombe Wanderers in 2014

Appearances and goals by club, season and competition
Club	Season	League			FA Cup		League Cup		Other		Total	
Club	Season	Division	Apps	Goals	Apps	Goals	Apps	Goals	Apps	Goals	Apps	Goals
Crystal Palace	2002–03	First Division	1	0	0	0	0	0	—		1	0
Crystal Palace	2003–04	First Division	0	0	0	0	0	0	0	0	0	0
Crystal Palace	2004–05	Premier League	0	0	0	0	0	0	—		0	0
Crystal Palace	2005–06	Championship	0	0	0	0	3	0	0	0	3	0
Crystal Palace	Total		1	0	0	0	3	0	0	0	4	0
Oxford United (loan)	2004–05	League Two	4	0	1	0	0	0	0	0	5	0
Northampton Town (loan)	2004–05	League Two	9	0	—		—		1 (Note: Appearance in the League Two play-offs)	0	10	0
Port Vale (loan)	2005–06	League One	27	2	2	2	—		1 (Note: Appearances in the Football League Trophy)	0	30	4
Barnsley	2006–07	Championship	44	1	2	0	0	0	—		46	1
Barnsley	2007–08	Championship	22	1	3	0	2	0	—		27	1
Barnsley	Total		66	2	5	0	2	0	0	0	73	2
Scunthorpe United	2008–09	League One	43	2	3	1	—		5 (Note: Four appearances and a goal in the Football League Trophy and one appearance in the League One play-offs)	1	51	4
Scunthorpe United	2009–10	Championship	41	2	2	0	4	0	—		47	2
Scunthorpe United	2010–11	Championship	36	0	1	0	3	0	—		40	0
Scunthorpe United	2011–12	League One	39	1	2	0	2	0	1	0	44	1
Scunthorpe United	Total		159	5	8	1	9	0	6	1	182	7
Wycombe Wanderers (loan)	2013–14	League Two	4	0	—		—		—		4	0
Chesterfield	2012–13	League Two	45	3	2	0	1	0	2	0	50	3
Chesterfield	2013–14	League Two	10	0	0	0	0	0	0	0	10	0
Chesterfield	Total		55	3	2	0	1	0	2	0	60	3
Barnet	2014–15	Conference Premier	42	0	3	0	—		0	0	45	0
Barnet	2015–16	League Two	39	1	0	0	1	0	0	0	40	1
Barnet	2016–17	League Two	12	0	0	0	1	0	1 (Note: Appearance in the EFL Trophy)	0	14	0
Barnet	Total		93	1	3	0	2	0	1	0	99	1
Eastleigh	2016–17	National League	23	1	1	0	—		0	0	24	1
Eastleigh	2017–18	National League	22	0	1	0	—		0	0	23	0
Eastleigh	Total		45	1	2	0	—		0	0	47	1
Slough Town	2018–19	National League South	40	3	4	0	—		0	0	44	3
Slough Town	2019–20	National League South	34	2	0	0	—		1 (Note: Appearance in the National League South play-offs)	0	35	2
Slough Town	2020–21	National League South	12	0	0	0	—		1 (Note: Appearance in the FA Trophy)	0	13	0
Slough Town	Total		86	5	4	0	0	0	2	0	92	5
Beaconsfield Town	2022–23	Southern League; Premier Division South	43	2	1	0	—		5 (Note: Three appearances in the FA Trophy and two appearances in the Berks & Bucks Senior Cup)	0	49	2
Beaconsfield Town	2023–24	Southern League; Premier Division South	15	1	2	0	—		3 (Note: Two appearances in the FA Trophy and one appearance in the Berks & Bucks Senior Cup)	0	20	1
Beaconsfield Town	Total		58	3	3	0	0	0	8	0	69	3
Career total			607	22	30	3	17	0	21	1	675	26

== Honours ==
Scunthorpe United

- Football League One play-offs: 2009
- Football League Trophy runner-up: 2008–09

Chesterfield

- Football League Two: 2013–14

Barnet

- Conference Premier: 2014–15

Slough Town

- Berks & Bucks Senior Cup: 2019

Individual

- Scunthorpe United Player of the Year: 2010–11
