= Ian Morris (footballer) =

Irish footballer and manager

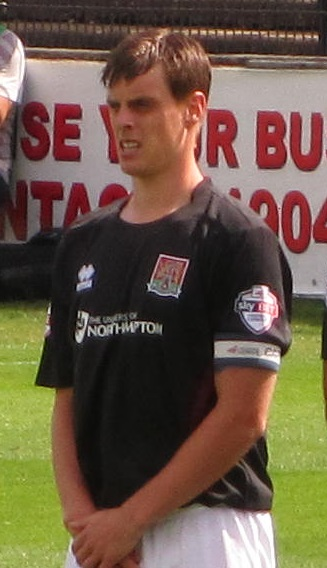
- Morris playing for Northampton Town in 2013

Personal information
- Full name: Ian Morris
- Date of birth: 27 February 1987 (age 39)
- Place of birth: Dublin, Ireland
- Height: 6 ft 0 in (1.83 m)
- Position: Midfielder

Youth career
- Lourdes Celtic

Senior career*
Years	Team	Apps	(Gls)
2005–2006	Leeds United	0	(0)
2005–2006	→ Blackpool (loan)	30	(3)
2006–2011	Scunthorpe United	76	(7)
2009	→ Carlisle United (loan)	6	(0)
2009–2010	→ Chesterfield (loan)	7	(0)
2010–2011	→ Chesterfield (loan)	19	(1)
2011–2013	Torquay United	50	(3)
2013–2015	Northampton Town	35	(3)
2015	St Patrick's Athletic	7	(0)
2016	Glenavon	2	(0)
2016–2018	Bohemians	67	(2)
Total		299	(19)

International career
	Republic of Ireland U19	10	(3)
2007	Republic of Ireland U21	1	(0)

Managerial career
- 2019–2021: Shelbourne
- 2022: Waterford
- * Club domestic league appearances and goals

Ian Morris (born 27 February 1987) is an Irish football manager and former player.

== Playing career ==
Dublin-born Morris played youth football with Lourdes Celtic and later came through the youth ranks at Leeds United. On 23 September 2005, with Morris yet to make a first team appearance for Leeds, he joined Blackpool on a month-long loan. After four appearances for the club, the loan was extended by a further month. Morris' loan was later extended for a third month. In January 2006, Morris agreed to return to Blackpool on loan for the rest of the season. He scored three goals in 30 appearances at Blackpool across the two loan spells, usually playing as a left-sided midfielder or striker.

On 30 August 2006, Morris signed for Scunthorpe United for an undisclosed fee.

On 26 March 2009, Morris joined Carlisle United on loan until the end of the season.

Morris joined Chesterfield on a month-long loan on 26 November 2009. On 23 December 2009 the loan was extended by a further month.

In July 2010, he signed a year-long loan deal to return to the Spireites for the 2010–11 campaign. Morris played 21 games in the 2010–11 season which saw Chesterfield win the Football League Two title.

On 18 July 2011, Morris signed for Torquay United on a two-year deal. He made his debut for the club in the 2–2 draw with Burton Albion on the opening day of the 2011–12 season.

Morris signed for Northampton Town on 26 June 2013. He was amongst seven players released by Northampton at the end of the 2014–15 season.

On 23 July 2015, Morris returned home to Dublin and signed for League of Ireland club St Patrick's Athletic. He made his debut the next day, in a 3–0 win away to Sligo Rovers. Morris scored the winning penalty in a 4–2 penalty shoot-out win against Dublin rivals Shamrock Rovers, to put Pats' into the 2015 League of Ireland Cup Final. On 5 March 2016, it was announced Morris had joined NIFL Premiership side Glenavon

However, in May 2016, Morris took a position with League of Ireland side Bohemians as their Youth Development Officer, and on 5 July signed as a player for the club, and was due to join the squad immediately. Morris made his first team debut for the club on 9 July in a mid-season friendly at home to Portsmouth.

== Managerial career ==
Having served as Youth Development Officer at Bohemians while playing for the club, he was appointed to his first managerial job at League of Ireland First Division club Shelbourne for the 2019 season. Morris guided Shelbourne to the 2019 League of Ireland First Division title and promotion to the Premier Division in his debut season as manager, though the club were relegated from the Premier Division the following season after losing in the relegation play-off. He again guided Shelbourne to the First Division title and promotion in the 2021 season before leaving the club at the end of that season.

On 22 December 2021, Morris was appointed as manager of First Division club Waterford. He was sacked on 20 April 2022 with the club 5th after 10 matches.

== Career statistics ==
=== Playing ===
Appearances and goals by club, season and competition
Club	Season	League			National cup (Note: Includes FA Cup, FAI Cup)		League cup (Note: Includes Football League Cup, League of Ireland Cup)		Other		Total	
Club	Season	Division	Apps	Goals	Apps	Goals	Apps	Goals	Apps	Goals	Apps	Goals
Leeds United	2005–06	Championship	0	0	0	0	0	0	0	0	0	0
Blackpool (loan)	2005–06	League One	30	3	0	0	0	0	1 (Note: Appearance(s) in Football League Trophy)	0	31	0
Scunthorpe United	2006–07	League One	28	3	2	0	1	0	0	0	31	3
Scunthorpe United	2007–08	Championship	25	3	1	0	0	0	0	0	26	3
Scunthorpe United	2008–09	League One	22	1	2	0	1	0	7 (Note: 6 appearances and 1 goal in Football League Trophy, 1 appearance in Football League One play-offs.)	1	32	2
Scunthorpe United	2009–10	Championship	3	0	0	0	0	0	0	0	3	0
Scunthorpe United	2010–11	Championship	0	0	0	0	0	0	0	0	0	0
Scunthorpe United	Total		78	7	5	0	2	0	7	1	92	8
Carlisle United (loan)	2008–09	League One	6	0	0	0	0	0	0	0	6	0
Chesterfield (loan)	2009–10	League Two	7	0	0	0	0	0	0	0	7	0
Chesterfield (loan)	2010–11	League Two	19	1	1	0	0	0	0	0	20	1
Torquay United	2011–12	League Two	37	2	2	0	1	0	2 (Note: Appearance(s) in Football League Two play-offs.)	0	42	2
Torquay United	2012–13	League Two	11	1	0	0	1	0	0	0	12	1
Torquay United	Total		48	3	2	0	2	0	2	0	54	3
Northampton Town	2013–14	League Two	33	3	2	0	1	0	0	0	36	3
Northampton Town	2014–15	League Two	2	0	0	0	1	0	0	0	3	0
Northampton Town	Total		35	3	2	0	2	0	0	0	39	3
St Patrick's Athletic	2015	League of Ireland Premier Division	7	0	0	0	2	0	1 (Note: Appearance(s) in Leinster Senior Cup)	0	10	0
Glenavon	2015–16	NIFL Premiership	2	0	0	0	0	0	0	0	2	0
Bohemians	2016	League of Ireland Premier Division	9	0	0	0	0	0	0	0	9	0
Bohemians	2017	League of Ireland Premier Division	29	0	0	0	1	1	0	0	30	1
Bohemians	2018	League of Ireland Premier Division	29	2	2	0	0	0	0	0	31	2
Bohemians	Total		67	2	2	0	1	1	0	0	70	3
Career total			299	19	12	0	9	1	11	1	331	21

=== Managerial ===
As of 21 April 2022

Managerial record by team and tenure
Team	From	To	Record				
Team	From	To	P	W	D	L	Win %
Shelbourne	6 November 2018	30 October 2021	79	42	16	21	53.2
Waterford	22 December 2021	20 April 2022	11	4	2	5	36.4
Total			90	46	18	26	51.1

== Honours ==
=== As a player ===
Scunthorpe United

- Football League One: 2006–07
- Football League One play-offs: 2009

Chesterfield

- Football League Two: 2010–11

St Patrick's Athletic

- League of Ireland Cup: 2015

Bohemians

- Leinster Senior Cup: 2015–16

=== As a manager ===
Shelbourne

- League of Ireland First Division: 2019, 2021
