= J. Steven Wharton =

English football chairman

John Steven Wharton (born October 1943) and widely known as Steve Wharton, is the former chairman and a previous majority shareholder of Scunthorpe United.

== Football chairman ==
Wharton became chairman of Scunthorpe United at the start of the 2001–02 season replacing his father Jack in the role. However, he later announced his resignation after stating that he would resign if the club were not promoted to the League One.

He returned as chairman in 2004 after a boardroom battle with his then replacement Chris Holland. He immediately re-appointed then manager Brian Laws following his sacking three weeks earlier. Along with Holland, three other board members resigned from the Glanford Park club.

He re-instated Laws again in 2012, but stood down as chairman and withdrew from the board at the end of the 2012–13 season for health reasons. He was replaced by former Gainsborough Trinity chairman Peter Swann. In a statement, Wharton said that he was leaving Scunthorpe on "a very low note" as the club had been relegated to League One. During his time with Scunthorpe, the club twice won promotion to the Championship. Under his tenure, the club had a reputation for punching above their weight, as well as developing young players and selling them on for big fees including Billy Sharp, Andy Keogh and Gary Hooper.

Wharton was praised by former Scunthorpe manager Nigel Adkins for the way he ran the club. In an interview with The Athletic, Adkins said: “When I was manager, the chairman was great — Mr Wharton, you’ve got to give him credit. I was pushing like mad to spend a bit more to get in a couple of better players to keep us up. He said ‘Nigel, you reap what you sow’ and he was right, you have to live within your means. I had a great relationship with Mr Wharton. There was stability and that helps. We live in a world where everyone wants to live now but we had a football club that was for the community." In the same piece, Adkins and several others criticised Wharton's successor Peter Swann as the club went into disarray under Swann's tenure.

== Business ==
He was the previous head of the Wharton shipping complex at nearby Gunness. This family business of shipping and freight transport was founded by his grandfather Joseph but its sale was announced in 2005.

Wharton joined the business in 1961, and was instrumental in the continuing growth and success of the company. His personal fortune has been estimated at £33 million. He also owns substantial farming land in Lincolnshire.

== Personal life ==
In 2012, Wharton spoke of how his son had suffered ME for the past 13 years, and despite being a fanatic shareholder in Scunthorpe United, he would not be able to take over ownership of the club.

On 17 March 2008, he suffered a suspected heart attack and was admitted to hospital. He was released from hospital on 26 March and spent time at home recovering. He returned to club duties in July.

He suffered a second heart attack in 2010 and cited his 2013 retirement as being necessary due to his health.
