= Kenny Milne (footballer) =

Scottish footballer

Personal information
- Full name: Kenneth Milne
- Date of birth: 26 August 1979 (age 47)
- Place of birth: Alloa, Scotland
- Position: Defender

Youth career
- 1995–1997: Rangers

Senior career*
Years	Team	Apps	(Gls)
1997–2002	Heart of Midlothian	12	(0)
1998–1999	→ Cowdenbeath (loan)	24	(6)
2002	→ Cowdenbeath (loan)	9	(0)
2002–2005	Partick Thistle	66	(1)
2005–2008	Falkirk	95	(4)
2008–2010	Scunthorpe United	5	(0)
Total		211	(11)

International career
2000	Scotland U21	1	(0)
- * Club domestic league appearances and goals

Kenneth Milne (born 26 August 1979) is a Scottish former professional footballer.

== Career ==
Despite his 6'3" stature, Milne actually started his career as a left winger with Heart of Midlothian whom he signed for from Rangers Boys Club in 1995. He was loaned to Cowdenbeath for the 1998–99 season before making his Hearts debut the following year. In 2000, Craig Levein, previously his manager at Cowdenbeath, was appointed Hearts head coach and their familiarity coupled with Hearts' lack of transfer funds, ensured Milne was afforded more first team opportunities. However, Milne was unable to establish himself in the Tynecastle side's starting XI and he left for Partick Thistle in 2002.

Milne's first season at Firhill was successful, the Jags exceeding expectations of relegation from the SPL by finishing 10th. Milne himself was converted to a leftback/left-sided centreback by manager John Lambie, and made numerous first team appearances in his new position. Partick struggled following Lambie's retirement though, and following successive relegations in 2003–04 and 2004–05, Milne moved to newly promoted Falkirk. Milne enjoyed relative success at the Falkirk Stadium in 2005–06, playing regularly as the Bairns reaffirmed their top-flight status, as well as notching his first SPL goal.

In July 2008, Milne signed for Football League One side Scunthorpe United on a two-year deal. After an impressive debut for Scunthorpe, Milne was carried off in only his 2nd appearance for his new side and subsequently suffered further setbacks. Despite a few attempted returns, he was eventually forced into early retirement in mid-2010, having only made a total of 8 appearances for the club. He remained at Scunthorpe in an unpaid coaching role, while undergoing rehabilitation. In January 2011 it was reported that he was set to make an unexpected return for Scunthorpe's reserves team. He would be required to play as a trialist as he is no longer a registered player. In February 2011, he was told to leave Scunthorpe United by then-manager Ian Baraclough if he wished to play football again.
