= Andrew Wright (footballer) =

English footballer (born 1985)

Personal information
- Full name: Andrew David Wright
- Date of birth: 15 January 1985 (age 41)
- Place of birth: Southport, England
- Height: 6 ft 1 in (1.85 m)
- Position: Midfielder

Youth career
- ?–2004: Liverpool

College career
Years	Team	Apps	(Gls)
2004–2007	West Virginia Mountaineers		

Senior career*
Years	Team	Apps	(Gls)
2007	Cape Cod Crusaders	13	(0)
2008–2012	Scunthorpe United	87	(0)
2010	→ Grimsby Town (loan)	9	(1)
2012	→ Grimsby Town (loan)	4	(1)
2012–2015	Morecambe	92	(0)
2015–2016	Southport	38	(3)
Total		243	(5)
- * Club domestic league appearances and goals

Andrew David Wright (born 15 January 1985) is an English former professional footballer and current coach who last played as a centre midfielder and right back.

He played for the Cape Cod Crusaders, Scunthorpe United, Grimsby Town, Morecambe and Southport.

== Career ==
A native of Southport, England, Wright began his career at his hometown club Liverpool as a youth team player, however he was released from the Anfield club in 2004 and subsequently joined American side West Virginia University where he also earned his degree in Physical Education, he is described as completing 'one of the finest careers in school history' and was called up to the College Men's MVP side – its version of an All-America team.

Wright joined Scunthorpe United in January 2008 from West Virginia University. On 28 September 2010 he joined Conference National team Grimsby Town on loan. He scored his first goal for Grimsby, and his first career goal, in a 3–3 draw with Forest Green Rovers on 7 October 2010. Wright was recalled by the Iron 26 November 2010 due to an injury crisis.

On 22 March 2012 Wright re-joined Grimsby Town on a one-month loan deal. He returned to Scunthorpe a month later after playing four times, scoring once.

He was released by the club in May 2012. and signed for Morecambe on 30 May 2012.

On 18 February 2014, Wright extended his contract at Morecambe until the end of the 2014–15 season.

Following his playing career, Wright entered the coaching ranks, returning to his college alma mater in 2016. He currently serves as the associate head coach for the men's soccer team at WVU.

== Honours ==
Scunthorpe United

- Football League One play-offs: 2009
- Football League Trophy runner-up: 2008–09
