= 2012–13 Scunthorpe United F.C. season =

Scunthorpe United F.C.
2012–13 season
- Chairman: J. Steven Wharton
- Manager: Alan Knill (until 29 October); Brian Laws (from 29 October)
- Stadium: Glanford Park
- League One: 21st (relegated)
- FA Cup: First round
- League Cup: Second round
- League Trophy: First round
- Top goalscorer: League: Leon Clarke & Karl Hawley (11); All: Leon Clarke & Karl Hawley (11)
- Highest home attendance: 6,020 vs Swindon Town, 27 April 2013
- Lowest home attendance: 752 vs Notts County, 5 September 2012
- Average home league attendance: 3,498
Home colours	Away colours

The 2012–13 season was Scunthorpe United F.C.'s second consecutive season in Football League One.

== Pre-season ==
17 July 2012	Bray Wanderers	0–1	Scunthorpe United	Bray
19:45 CEST		Report	Barcham 57'	Stadium: Carlisle Grounds

19 July 2012	Wayside Celtic	0–1	Scunthorpe United	Kilternan
19:45 CEST		Report	Hughes	Stadium: Golden Ball

24 July 2012 Lincolnshire Senior Cup; Semi-Final	Scunthorpe United	0–2	Grimsby Town	Scunthorpe
19:00 CEST		Report	Soares 39'; Cook 74'	Stadium: Glanford Park

28 July 2012	FC Halifax Town	0–1	Scunthorpe United	Halifax
15:00 CEST		Report	Grant 67'	Stadium: The Shay

1 August 2012	Winterton Rangers	1–1	Scunthorpe United	Winterton
19:30 CEST	Batty 90'	Report	Godden 65'	Stadium: West Street

3 August 2012	Scunthorpe United	1–1	Manchester United XI	Scunthorpe
19:30 CEST	Duffy 24'	Report	Powell 54'	Stadium: Glanford Park

8 August 2012	Scunthorpe United	3–2	Middlesbrough	Scunthorpe
19:30 CEST	Grella 45'; Walker 56'; Grant 80'	Report	Park 5'; Main 23' (pen.)	Stadium: Glanford Park

== Competitions ==
=== League One ===
==== Standings ====
Pos	Team	Pld	W	D	L	GF	GA	GD	Pts	Promotion, qualification or relegation
19	Oldham Athletic	46	14	9	23	46	59	−13	51	
20	Colchester United	46	14	9	23	47	68	−21	51	
21	Scunthorpe United (R)	46	13	9	24	49	73	−24	48	Relegation to Football League Two
22	Bury (R)	46	9	14	23	45	73	−28	41	Relegation to Football League Two
23	Hartlepool United (R)	46	9	14	23	39	67	−28	41	Relegation to Football League Two

Updated to match(es) played on 27 April 2013. Source: BBC Sport
Rules for classification: 1) Points; 2) Goal difference; 3) Number of goals scored
(R) Relegated

==== Results summary ====
Overall								Home						Away					
Pld	W	D	L	GF	GA	GD	Pts	W	D	L	GF	GA	GD	W	D	L	GF	GA	GD
47	14	9	24	53	71	−18	51	8	6	10	33	36	−3	6	3	14	20	35	−15

Last updated: 3 May 2013.

==== Result round by round ====
Round	1	2	3	4	5	6	7	8	9	10	11	12	13	14	15	16	17	18	19	20	21	22	23	24	25	26	27	28	29	30	31	32	33	34	35	36	37	38	39	40	41	42	43	44	45	46
Ground	A	H	H	A	H	A	A	H	A	H	A	H	A	H	H	A	A	H	H	A	H	A	A	A	H	H	A	A	A	H	H	H	A	H	H	A	H	A	H	H	A	A	H	A	A	H
Result	L	L	L	L	D	W	D	W	L	L	L	D	D	L	L	W	W	D	L	L	L	W	L	L	D	D	W	D	L	W	W	W	L	L	W	L	L	L	L	W	L	L	D	L	W	W
Position	23	24	24	24	24	21	21	18	19	21	22	22	22	22	22	22	21	22	23	23	23	22	23	23	23	21	20	21	22	20	20	18	19	20	19	20	20	20	21	20	21	21	21	21	21	21

Updated to match(es) played on 3 May 2013. Source:
A = Away; H = Home; W = Win; D = Draw; L = Loss

==== Matches ====
18 August 2012 1	Crawley Town	3–0	Scunthorpe United	Crawley
15:00 BST	Alexander 33', 64' (pen.); Forte 80'	Report	(yellow card) 85' (red card) Duffy	Stadium: Broadfield Stadium; Attendance: 3,172

21 August 2012 2	Scunthorpe United	1–2	Crewe Alexandra	Scunthorpe
19:45 BST	Grella 15'	Report	1' Leitch-Smith; 73' Murphy	Stadium: Glanford Park; Attendance: 3,215

25 August 2012 3	Scunthorpe United	0–4	Yeovil Town	Scunthorpe
15:00 BST		Report	37' Marsh-Brown; 50' Reid; 88', 90' Ugwu	Stadium: Glanford Park; Attendance: 3,279

1 September 2012 4	Hartlepool United	2–0	Scunthorpe United	Hartlepool
15:00 BST	Franks 23'; James 86'	Report	(red card) 79' Walker	Stadium: Victoria Park; Attendance: 3,863

8 September 2012 5	Scunthorpe United	1–1	Sheffield United	Scunthorpe
15:00 BST	Clarke 60'	Report	(red card) 15' Doyle; (red card) 72' Flynn; 83' Collins	Stadium: Glanford Park; Attendance: 5,553

15 September 6	Shrewsbury Town	0–1	Scunthorpe United	Shrewsbury
15:00 BST		Report	5' Clarke	Stadium: New Meadow; Attendance: 5,623

18 September 7	Oldham Athletic	1–1	Scunthorpe United	Oldham
19:45 BST	Derbyshire 40'	Report	3' Clarke	Stadium: Boundary Park; Attendance: 2,969

22 September 8	Scunthorpe United	1–0	Colchester United	Scunthorpe
15:00 BST	Clarke 76' (pen.)	Report		Stadium: Glanford Park; Attendance: 3,133

29 September 9	Portsmouth	2–1	Scunthorpe United	Portsmouth
15:00 BST	Gyepes 12'; Thomas 89'	Report	6' Clarke	Stadium: Fratton Park; Attendance: 10,995

2 October 10	Scunthorpe United	1–3	Tranmere Rovers	Scunthorpe
19:45 BST	Hawley 15'	Report	64' Wallace; 66', 88' Akpa Akpro	Stadium: Glanford Park; Attendance: 2,768

6 October 11	Stevenage	1–0	Scunthorpe United	Stevenage
15:00 BST	Tansey 75'	Report		Stadium: Broadhall Way; Attendance: 2,953

13 October 12	Scunthorpe United	1–1	Brentford	Scunthorpe
15:00 BST	Clarke 77'; Mirfin (yellow card) 86' (yellow-red card)	Report	43' Forrester	Stadium: Glanford Park; Attendance: 3,008

20 October 13	Swindon Town	1–1	Scunthorpe United	Swindon
15:00 BST	Collins 18'; Flint (yellow card) 33' (yellow-red card)	Report	56' Hawley	Stadium: County Ground; Attendance: 7,388

23 October 14	Scunthorpe United	2–3	Preston North End	Scunthorpe
19:45 BST	Clarke 42'; Hawley 72'	Report	1', 28', 36' Wroe	Stadium: Glanford Park; Attendance: 2,671

27 October 15	Scunthorpe United	0–3	Milton Keynes Dons	Scunthorpe
15:00 BST		Report	17', 30' Chadwick; 60' Smith	Stadium: Glanford Park; Attendance: 2,737

6 November 16	Walsall	1–4	Scunthorpe United	Walsall
19:45 GMT	Grigg 90+2'	Report	13', 50' Canavan; 30' Duffy; (red card) 45' Prutton; 75' Clarke	Stadium: Bescot Stadium; Attendance: 2,787

10 November 17	Coventry City	1–2	Scunthorpe United	Coventry
15:00 GMT	Baker 35'	Report	43' (pen.), 76'	Stadium: Ricoh Arena; Attendance: 9,892

17 November 18	Scunthorpe United	2–2	Notts County	Scunthorpe
15:00 GMT	Ribeiro 13'; Mozika 45'; Reid (red card) 69'	Report	34', 82' Hughes	Stadium: Glanford Park; Attendance: 4,553

20 November 19	Scunthorpe United	1–2	Bury	Scunthorpe
19:45 GMT	Clarke 52'	Report	12' Schumacher; 54' Hewitt	Stadium: Glanford Park; Attendance: 3,027

24 November 20	Doncaster Rovers	4–0	Scunthorpe United	Doncaster
15:00 GMT	Woods 22'; Cotterill 46'; Jones 62'; Paynter 64'	Report		Stadium: Keepmoat Stadium; Attendance: 8,037

8 December 21	Scunthorpe United	1–2	Bournemouth	Scunthorpe
15:00 GMT	Hawley 64' (pen.)	Report	27' Grabban; 30' Fogden	Stadium: Glanford Park; Attendance: 2,875

15 December 22	Leyton Orient	1–3	Scunthorpe United	London
15:00 GMT	Lisbie 79' (pen.)	Report	61' Ribeiro; 69' Hawley; 80' Mozika	Stadium: Brisbane Road; Attendance: 4,942

22 December	Scunthorpe United	P–P	Carlisle United	Scunthorpe
15:00 GMT		Report		Stadium: Glanford Park

26 December 23	Sheffield United	3–0	Scunthorpe United	Sheffield
15:00 GMT	Miller 4'; Kitson 56'; Blackman 84' (pen.)	Report		Stadium: Brammall Lane; Attendance: 21,819

29 December 24	Tranmere Rovers	1–0	Scunthorpe United	Tranmere
15:00 GMT	Stockton 59'	Report		Stadium: Prenton Park; Attendance: 6,044

1 January 25	Scunthorpe United	2–2	Oldham Athletic	Scunthorpe
15:00 GMT	Canavan 16'; Duffy 19'	Report	35' Byrne; 65' (pen.) Baxte; (red card) 68' Wesolowski	Stadium: Glanford Park; Attendance: 3,116

5 January 26	Scunthorpe United	0–0	Shrewsbury Town	Scunthorpe
15:00 GMT		Report		Stadium: Glanford Park; Attendance: 3,044

12 January 27	Colchester United	1–2	Scunthorpe United	Colchester
15:00 GMT	Sears 59'	Report	41' Ryan; 46' Hawley	Stadium: Colchester Community Stadium; Attendance: 3,258

19 January	Scunthorpe United	P–P	Portsmouth	Scunthorpe
15:00 GMT		Report		Stadium: Glanford Park

26 January 28	Carlisle United	1–1	Scunthorpe United	Carlisle
15:00 GMT	Symington 76'	Report	52' Hawley	Stadium: Brunton Park; Attendance: 3,829

2 February 29	Crewe Alexandra	1–0	Scunthorpe United	Crewe
15:00 GMT	Leitch-Smith 75'	Report		Stadium: Alexandra Stadium; Attendance: 4,302

5 February 30	Scunthorpe United	2–1	Portsmouth	Scunthorpe
19:45 GMT	Sodje 40', 85'	Report	45' Walker	Stadium: Glanford Park; Attendance: 2,596

9 February 31	Scunthorpe United	2–1	Crawley Town	Scunthorpe
15:00 GMT	Ryan 67'; Canavan 79'	Report	48' Sparrow	Stadium: Glanford Park; Attendance: 3,124

12 February 32	Scunthorpe United	3–1	Carlisle United	Scunthorpe
19:45 GMT	Sodje 17', 90'; Reid 22'	Report	45' Berrett	Stadium: Glanford Park; Attendance: 3,112

16 February 33	Yeovil Town	3–1	Scunthorpe United	Yeovil
15:00 GMT	Webster 28'; Hayter 72' (pen.); Madden 75'	Report		Stadium: Huish Park; Attendance: 4,163

23 February 34	Scunthorpe United	1–2	Hartlepool United	Scunthorpe
15:00 GMT	Alabi 77'	Report	20' Poole; 37' Franks	Stadium: Glanford Park; Attendance: 3,434

26 February 35	Scunthorpe United	1–0	Stevenage	Scunthorpe
19:45 GMT	Duffy 66'	Report		Stadium: Glanford Park; Attendance: 2,382

2 March 36	Brentford	1–0	Scunthorpe United	London
15:00 GMT	Adeyemi 70'	Report		Stadium: Griffin Park; Attendance: 5,400

9 March 37	Scunthorpe United	1–2	Coventry City	Scunthorpe
15:00 GMT	Sodje 8'	Report	45' Baker; 77' Clarke	Stadium: Glanford Park; Attendance: 3,676

16 March 38	Notts County	1–0	Scunthorpe United	Nottingham
15:00 GMT	Leacock 81'	Report		Stadium: Meadow Lane; Attendance: 4,634

23 March 39	Scunthorpe United	2–3	Doncaster Rovers	Scunthorpe
15:00 GMT	Duffy 41'; Hawley 85'	Report	5' (o.g.) Mirfin; 39' Hume; 48' Brown	Stadium: Glanford Park; Attendance: 5,288

29 March 40	Scunthorpe United	2–1	Leyton Orient	Scunthorpe
15:00 GMT	Sodje 3'; Canavan 42'	Report	45' Lisbie	Stadium: Glanford Park; Attendance: 3,052

1 April 41	Bournemouth	1–0	Scunthorpe United	Bournemouth
15:00 BST	Pitman 11'	Report		Stadium: Dean Court; Attendance: 7,465

6 April 42	Preston North End	3–0	Scunthorpe United	Preston
15:00 BST	Holmes 38'; Wroe 77'; King 90'	Report		Stadium: Deepdale; Attendance: 8,118

13 April 43	Scunthorpe United	1–1	Walsall	Scunthorpe
15:00 BST	Canavan 88'	Report	54' Grigg	Stadium: Glanford Park; Attendance: 4,049

16 April 44	Bury	2–1	Scunthorpe United	Bury
19:45 BST	Clarke-Harris 68'; Ajose 70'	Report	45' Hawley	Stadium: Gigg Lane; Attendance: 1,567

20 April 45	Milton Keynes Dons	0–1	Scunthorpe United	Milton Keynes
15:00 BST		Report	41' Hawley	Stadium: Stadium:mk; Attendance: 9,752

27 April 46	Scunthorpe United	3–1	Swindon Town	Scunthorpe
15:00 BST	Collins 87'; Duffy 90' (pen.); Hawley 90'	Report	83' Collins	Stadium: Glanford Park; Attendance: 6,020

=== FA Cup ===
3 November 2012 Round 1	Gillingham	4–0	Scunthorpe United	Gillingham
15:00 GMT	Fish 59'; Burton 65'; Kedwell 76' (pen.); Birchall 90'	Report		Stadium: Priestfield Stadium; Attendance: 4,017

=== League Cup ===
14 August 2012 Round 1	Derby County	5–5 (6–7 p)	Scunthorpe United	Derby
19:45 BST	Keogh 30'; Buxton 34' 53'; Robinson 40'; Tyson 83'		52' Barcham; 63' Grella; 73', 90+7' (pen.) Grant; 90+5'Jennings	Stadium: Pride Park
	Penalties
	Davies (penalty missed); Tyson (penalty scored); Brayford (penalty missed); Keogh (penalty scored); Robinson (penalty scored); Jacobs (penalty scored); Coutts (penalty scored); Buxton (penalty scored); Naylor (penalty missed)		(penalty missed) Grella; (penalty scored) Kennedy; (penalty scored) Walker; (penalty missed) Duffy; (penalty scored) Grant; (penalty scored) Newey; (penalty scored) Ryan; (penalty scored) Mirfin; (penalty scored) Jennings

28 August 2012 Round 2	Norwich City	2–1	Scunthorpe United	Norwich
19:45	Lappin 32'; Hoolahan 56' (pen.)	Report	34' Duffy	Stadium: Carrow Road; Attendance: 13,116

=== League Trophy ===
5 September 2012 Round 1	Scunthorpe United	1–2	Notts County	Scunthorpe
19:45	Duffy 11'	Report	41' Showunmi; 58' Regan	Stadium: Glanford Park; Attendance: 752

== Squad ==
Note: Flags indicate national team as defined under FIFA eligibility rules; some limited exceptions apply. Players may hold more than one non-FIFA nationality.

No.	Pos.	Nation	Player
1	GK	ENG	Sam Slocombe
2	DF	WAL	Christian Ribeiro
3	DF	ENG	Callum Kennedy
4	MF	ENG	Josh Walker
5	DF	ENG	David Mirfin
6	DF	ENG	Paul Reid
7	MF	IRL	Jimmy Ryan
8	MF	FRA	Damien Mozika
9	FW	ENG	Akpo Sodje
10	FW	USA	Mike Grella
11	MF	ENG	Andy Barcham
12	FW	ENG	Connor Jennings (on loan at Luton Town)
13	GK	ENG	James Severn
14	MF	IRL	Robbie Gibbons

No.	Pos.	Nation	Player
15	DF	IRL	Niall Canavan
16	MF	ENG	Mark Duffy
17	FW	ENG	Matt Godden (on loan at Ebbsfleet United)
18	DF	IRL	Eddie Nolan
19	MF	IRL	Michael Collins
20	DF	ENG	Callum Howe
21	DF	ENG	Tom Newey
22	FW	ENG	Karl Hawley
23	MF	IRL	Anthony Forde (on loan from Wolverhampton Wanderers)
24	MF	ENG	Jamie Wooton
25	MF	ENG	Chris Sedgwick (on loan at Hyde)
26	GK	NOR	Eirik Holmen Johansen (on loan from Manchester City)
27	FW	ENG	James Alabi (on loan from Stoke City)
28	FW	ENG	Hakeeb Adelakun

=== Statistics ===
As of 3 May 2013

No.	Pos	Nat	Player	Total		League One		FA Cup		League Cup		League Trophy	
No.	Pos	Nat	Player	Apps	Goals	Apps	Goals	Apps	Goals	Apps	Goals	Apps	Goals
1	GK	(England) ENG	Sam Slocombe	33	0	29	0	1	0	2	0	1	0
2	DF	(Wales) WAL	Christian Ribeiro	32	2	27+1	2	1	0	2	0	1	0
3	DF	(England) ENG	Callum Kennedy	18	0	11+6	0	0	0	1	0	0	0
4	MF	(England) ENG	Josh Walker	26	0	21+2	0	1	0	2	0	0	0
5	DF	(England) ENG	David Mirfin	34	0	23+7	0	1	0	2	0	1	0
6	DF	(England) ENG	Paul Reid	27	1	26	1	1	0	0	0	0	0
7	MF	(Republic of Ireland) IRL	Jimmy Ryan	49	2	42+3	2	0+1	0	2	0	0+1	0
8	MF	(France) FRA	Damien Mozika	12	2	8+3	2	0+1	0	0	0	0	0
9	FW	(England) ENG	Akpo Sodje	15	6	12+3	6	0	0	0	0	0	0
10	FW	(United States) USA	Mike Grella	29	2	11+14	1	1	0	2	1	1	0
11	MF	(England) ENG	Andy Barcham	38	1	22+12	0	1	0	2	1	0+1	0
12	FW	(England) ENG	Connor Jennings	16	1	2+10	0	0+1	0	0+2	1	1	0
13	GK	(England) ENG	James Severn	1	0	0+1	0	0	0	0	0	0	0
14	MF	(Republic of Ireland) IRL	Robbie Gibbons	9	0	7	0	0	0	1	0	1	0
15	DF	(Republic of Ireland) IRL	Niall Canavan	42	6	38+2	6	0	0	1	0	1	0
16	MF	(England) ENG	Mark Duffy	48	6	43	4	2	0	2	1	1	1
17	FW	(England) ENG	Matt Godden	8	0	5+3	0	0	0	0	0	0	0
18	DF	(Republic of Ireland) IRL	Eddie Nolan	12	0	11+1	0	0	0	0	0	0	0
19	MF	(Republic of Ireland) IRL	Michael Collins	31	1	27+3	1	1	0	0	0	0	0
20	DF	(England) ENG	Callum Howe	0	0	0	0	0	0	0	0	0	0
21	DF	(England) ENG	Tom Newey	48	0	44	0	1	0	2	0	1	0
22	FW	(England) ENG	Karl Hawley	40	11	37+2	11	1	0	0	0	0	0
23	MF	(Republic of Ireland) IRL	Anthony Forde (on loan from Wolverhampton Wanderers)	7	0	6+1	0	0	0	0	0	0	0
24	FW	(England) ENG	Jamie Wooton	1	0	0+1	0	0	0	0	0	0	0
26	GK	(Norway) NOR	Eirik Holmen Johansen (on loan from Manchester City)	8	0	8	0	0	0	0	0	0	0
27	FW	(England) ENG	James Alabi (on loan from Stoke City)	9	1	0+9	1	0	0	0	0	0	0
28	FW	(England) ENG	Hakeeb Adelakun	2	0	0+2	0	0	0	0	0	0	0
	FW	(Republic of Ireland) IRL	Jordan Keegan	4	0	0+3	0	0	0	0	0	1	0
Players currently on loan:
25	MF	(England) ENG	Chris Sedgwick (at Hyde)	4	0	0+4	0	0	0	0	0	0	0
Players featured for club who have left:
9	FW	(England) ENG	Bobby Grant	5	2	3	0	0	0	1+1	2	0	0
9	FW	(England) ENG	Leon Clarke (on loan from Charlton Athletic)	15	11	14+1	11	0	0	0	0	0	0
18	MF	(Republic of Ireland) IRL	Mark Hughes	1	0	0	0	0	0	0	0	0+1	0
24	MF	(England) ENG	David Prutton (on loan from Sheffield Wednesday)	15	0	13	0	0	0	0+1	0	1	0
26	GK	(England) ENG	Steve Mildenhall (on loan from Millwall)	9	0	9	0	0	0	0	0	0	0
27	FW	(England) ENG	Nathan Ellington (on loan from Ipswich Town)	6	0	2+4	0	0	0	0	0	0	0
28	DF	(Northern Ireland) NIR	Mark McChrystal (on loan from Tranmere Rovers)	3	0	3	0	0	0	0	0	0	0
29	FW	(Denmark) DEN	Adda Djeziri (on loan from Blackpool)	4	0	1+3	0	0	0	0	0	0	0

==== Goalscoring record ====
N	P	Name	League One	FA Cup	League Cup	JP Trophy	Total
~~9~~	FW	Leon Clarke	11	0	0	0	11
22	FW	Karl Hawley	11	0	0	0	11
15	DF	Niall Canavan	6	0	0	0	6
16	MF	Mark Duffy	4	0	1	1	6
9	FW	Akpo Sodje	6	0	0	0	6
8	MF	Damien Mozika	2	0	0	0	2
2	DF	Christian Ribeiro	2	0	0	0	2
~~9~~	FW	Bobby Grant	0	0	2	0	2
10	FW	Mike Grella	1	0	1	0	2
7	MF	Jimmy Ryan	2	0	0	0	2
27	FW	James Alabi	1	0	0	0	1
11	MF	Andy Barcham	0	0	1	0	1
19	MF	Michael Collins	1	0	0	0	1
12	FW	Connor Jennings	0	0	1	0	1
6	DF	Paul Reid	1	0	0	0	1
Totals			47	0	6	1	54

==== Disciplinary record ====
No.	Pos.	Name	League One		FA Cup		League Cup		League Trophy		Total	
No.	Pos.	Name	Yellow card	Red card	Yellow card	Red card	Yellow card	Red card	Yellow card	Red card	Yellow card	Red card
1	GK	Sam Slocombe	1	0	0	0	0	0	0	0	1	0
2	DF	Christian Ribeiro	4	0	0	0	0	0	0	0	4	0
3	DF	Callum Kennedy	1	0	0	0	0	0	0	0	1	0
4	MF	Josh Walker	5	1	0	0	1	0	0	0	6	1
5	DF	David Mirfin	2	1	1	0	0	0	0	0	3	1
6	DF	Paul Reid	8	1	1	0	0	0	0	0	9	1
7	MF	Jimmy Ryan	6	0	0	0	0	0	0	0	6	0
8	MF	Damien Mozika	1	0	0	0	0	0	0	0	1	0
~~9~~	FW	Bobby Grant	0	0	0	0	1	0	0	0	1	0
9	FW	Akpo Sodje	2	0	0	0	0	0	0	0	2	0
10	FW	Mike Grella	0	0	0	0	1	0	0	0	1	0
11	FW	Andy Barcham	2	0	0	0	0	0	0	0	2	0
12	FW	Connor Jennings	0	0	0	0	1	0	0	0	1	0
14	MF	Robbie Gibbons	2	0	0	0	0	0	0	0	2	0
15	DF	Niall Canavan	4	0	0	0	0	0	0	0	4	0
16	MF	Mark Duffy	4	1	0	0	0	0	0	0	4	1
19	MF	Michael Collins	3	0	1	0	0	0	0	0	4	0
21	DF	Tom Newey	7	0	0	0	0	0	0	0	7	0
22	FW	Karl Hawley	1	1	1	0	0	0	0	0	2	1
~~24~~	MF	David Prutton	5	0	0	0	0	0	1	0	6	0
28	FW	James Alabi	1	0	0	0	0	0	0	0	1	0
~~28~~	DF	Mark McChrystal	1	0	0	0	0	0	0	0	1	0
29	FW	Adda Djeziri	1	0	0	0	0	0	0	0	1	0
Totals			60	4	4	0	4	0	1	0	70	5

== Transfers ==
=== In ===
No.	Pos.	Nat.	Name	Age	EU	Moving from	Type	Transfer window	Ends	Transfer fee	Source
20	DF	(England)	Callum Howe	18	EU	Youth system	Promoted	Summer	2013	Youth system	
4	MF	(England)	Josh Walker	23	EU	Watford	Free transfer	Summer	2013	Free	
13	GK	(England)	James Severn	20	EU	Derby County	Free transfer	Summer	2013	Free	
3	DF	(England)	Callum Kennedy	23	EU	Swindon Town	Free transfer	Summer	2014	Free	
10	FW	(United States)	Mike Grella	25	EU	Bury	Free transfer	Summer	2014	Free	
2	DF	(Wales)	Christian Ribeiro	22	EU	Bristol City	Free transfer	Summer	2014	Free	
5	DF	(England)	David Mirfin	27	EU	Watford	Free transfer	Summer	2014	Free	
21	DF	(England)	Tom Newey	29	EU	Rotherham United	Free transfer	Summer	2013	Free	
18	MF	(Republic of Ireland)	Mark Hughes	20	EU	Tolka Rovers (Republic of Ireland)	Free transfer	Summer	2013	Free	
23	FW	(Republic of Ireland)	Jordan Keegan	22	EU	Free agent	Free transfer	Summer	2013	Free	
22	FW	(England)	Karl Hawley	30	EU	Free agent	Free transfer		2013	Free	
25	MF	(England)	Chris Sedgwick	32	EU	Free agent	Free transfer		N/A	Free	
9	FW	(England)	Akpo Sodje	32	EU	Free agent	Free transfer	Winter	2013	Free	
	DF	(Republic of Ireland)	Eddie Nolan	24	EU	Free agent	Free transfer		Non-Contract	Free	

=== Loans in ===
No.	Pos.	Name	Country	Age	Loan club	Started	Ended	Start source	End source
24	MF	David Prutton	(England)	31	Sheffield Wednesday	28 August	1 December		
9	FW	Leon Clarke	(England)	27	Charlton Athletic	7 September	7 December		
26	GK	Steve Mildenhall	(England)	33	Millwall	5 November	31 December		
27	FW	Nathan Ellington	(England)	31	Ipswich Town	16 November	8 January		
28	DF	Mark McChrystal	(Northern Ireland)	28	Tranmere Rovers	20 November	28 December		
29	FW	Adda Djeziri	(Denmark)	24	Blackpool	22 November	3 January		
27	FW	James Alabi	(England)	31	Stoke City	21 February	21 March		
26	GK	Eirik Holmen Johansen	(Norway)	34	Manchester City	7 March	31 May		
23	MF	Anthony Forde	(Republic of Ireland)	33	Wolverhampton Wanderers	14 March	31 May		

Sources: For loan start source see "Start source". For loan end source see "End source".
EU = if holds or not a European Union passport; Country: when 2 flags, 1st flag = country that plays for internationally, 2nd flag = country of birth; No. = number on jersey; P = Position (for position name, pause mouse pointer on abbreviation); Name = Name on jersey (for more extensive name, pause mouse pointer on name); In/Out = In: The player came in on loan, Out: The player went out on loan; Loan club = the club that the player moved on loan to or the club that the player came from on loan; Started = the date when the player's loan started; Ended = the date when the player's loan ended.

=== Out ===
No.	Pos.	Name	Country	Age	Type	Moving to	Transfer window	Transfer fee	Apps	Goals	Source
6	DF	Cliff Byrne	(Republic of Ireland)	30	Contract Ended	Oldham Athletic	Summer	N/A	329	9	
1	GK	Josh Lillis	(England)	24	Contract Ended	Rochdale	Summer	Free	50	0	
3	DF	Eddie Nolan	(Republic of Ireland)	23	Contract Ended		Summer	N/A	74	1	
8	MF	Michael O'Connor	(Northern Ireland)	24	Contract Ended	Rotherham United	Summer	Free	108	13	
24	DF	Ashley Palmer	(England)	19	Contract Ended		Summer	N/A	2	0	
10	FW	Jordan Robertson	(England)	24	Contract Ended	Global F.C. (Philippines)	Summer	N/A	20	3	
11	MF	Garry Thompson	(England)	31	Contract Ended	Bradford City	Summer	N/A	130	20	
4	MF	Sam Togwell	(England)	27	Contract Ended	Chesterfield	Summer	N/A	182	7	
23	FW	Aron Wint	(England)	19	Contract Ended	Hinckley United	Summer	N/A	1	0	
2	DF	Andrew Wright	(England)	27	Contract Ended	Morecambe	Summer	Free	102	0	
21	MF	Scott Matthews	(England)	18	Released		Summer	N/A	0	0	
9	FW	Bobby Grant	(England)	22	Transfer	Rochdale	Summer	Undisclosed	59	7	

EU = if holds or not a European Union passport; Country: when 2 flags, 1st flag = country that plays for internationally, 2nd flag = country of birth; N = number on jersey; P = Position (for position name, pause mouse pointer on abbreviation); Name = Name on jersey (for more extensive name, pause mouse pointer on name); Age = age on the day of the signing; Moving from = only indicate the club the player was playing before start playing for this club in this season, for the type of the moving see Status column; Moving to = only indicates the club the player is going to play next, for the type of the moving see Status column; Ends = when the player's current contract ends; n/a = Not applicable; Apps = Total number of competitive appearances (including substitute appearances) at the club prior to departure; Goals = Total number of competitive goals scored at the club prior to departure.

=== Loans out ===
No.	Pos.	Name	Country	Age	Loan club	Started	Ended	Start source	End source
17	FW	Matt Godden	(England)	21	Ebbsfleet United	8 November	8 December		
12	FW	Connor Jennings	(England)	21	Luton Town	16 November	16 January		
25	MF	Chris Sedgwick	(England)	32	Hyde	16 November			
17	FW	Matt Godden	(England)	21	Ebbsfleet United	8 March	April		

Sources: For loan start source see "Start source". For loan end source see "End source".
EU = if holds or not a European Union passport; Country: when 2 flags, 1st flag = country that plays for internationally, 2nd flag = country of birth; No. = number on jersey; P = Position (for position name, pause mouse pointer on abbreviation); Name = Name on jersey (for more extensive name, pause mouse pointer on name); In/Out = In: The player came in on loan, Out: The player went out on loan; Loan club = the club that the player moved on loan to or the club that the player came from on loan; Started = the date when the player's loan started; Ended = the date when the player's loan ended.

=== Contracts ===
No.	Pos.	Nat.	Name	Age	Status	Contract length	Expiry date	Source
1	GK	(England)	Sam Slocombe	23	Signed	2 years	June 2014	
9	FW	(England)	Bobby Grant	21	Signed	1 year	June 2013	
22	FW	(England)	Karl Hawley	31	Signed	6 months	June 2013	

== Overall summary ==
=== Summary ===
Games played	50 (46 League One, 1 FA Cup, 2 League Cup, 1 League Trophy)
Games won	13 (13 League One, 0 FA Cup, 0 League Cup, 0 League Trophy)
Games drawn	10 (9 League One, 0 FA Cup, 1 League Cup, 0 League Trophy)
Games lost	27 (24 League One, 1 FA Cup, 1 League Cup, 1 League Trophy)
Goals scored	59 (50 League One, 0 FA Cup, 6 League Cup, 1 League Trophy)
Goals conceded	88 (73 League One, 4 FA Cup, 7 League Cup, 2 League Trophy)
Goal difference	−29
Clean sheets	5 (5 League One, 0 FA Cup, 0 League Cup, 0 League Trophy)
Yellow cards	69 (60 League One, 4 FA Cup, 4 League Cup, 1 League Trophy)
Red cards	5 (5 League One, 0 FA Cup, 0 League Cup, 0 League Trophy)
Worst discipline	Paul Reid (9 (yellow card) 1 (red card) )
Best result	4–1 vs Walsall (A)
Worst result	0–4 vs Yeovil Town (H), Gillingham (A) & Doncaster Rovers (A)
Most appearances	Tom Newey (49 apps)
Top scorer	Leon Clarke & Karl Hawley (11 goals)
Points	48

=== Score overview ===
Opposition	Home score	Away score	Double
Bournemouth	1–2	0–1	No
Brentford	1–1	0–1	No
Bury	1–2	1–2	No
Carlisle United	3–1	1–1	No
Colchester United	1–0	2–1	Yes
Coventry City	1–2	2–1	No
Crawley Town	2–1	0–3	No
Crewe Alexandra	1–2	0–1	No
Doncaster Rovers	2–3	0–4	No
Hartlepool United	1–2	0–2	No
Leyton Orient	2–1	3–1	Yes
Milton Keynes Dons	0–3	1–0	No
Notts County	1–1	0–1	No
Oldham Athletic	2–2	1–1	No
Preston North End	2–3	0–3	No
Portsmouth	2–1	1–2	No
Sheffield United	1–1	0–3	No
Shrewsbury Town	0–0	1–0	No
Stevenage	1–0	0–1	No
Swindon Town	3–1	1–1	No
Tranmere Rovers	1–3	0–1	No
Walsall	1–1	4–1	
Yeovil Town	0–4	0–3	No
