= 2011–12 Scunthorpe United F.C. season =

Scunthorpe United F.C.
2011–12 season
- Chairman: J. Steven Wharton
- Manager: Alan Knill
- Stadium: Glanford Park
- League One: 18th
- FA Cup: First round (eliminated by AFC Wimbledon)
- League Cup: Second round (eliminated by Newcastle United)
- League Trophy: Second round (eliminated by Oldham Athletic)
- Top goalscorer: League: Andy Barcham (8); All: Andy Barcham (9); Bobby Grant (9)
- Highest home attendance: 6,047 vs. Sheffield United, 10 September
- Lowest home attendance: 1,763 vs. Hartlepool United, 31 August
- Average home league attendance: 4,097

The 2011–12 season is Scunthorpe United F.C.'s first in League One since being relegated last season from the Championship.

== Season review ==
=== Pre-season ===
Scunthorpe began their pre-season campaign against non-league Bottesford Town, who they beat 7–0, the Irons first goal came courtesy of trialist Mustafa Tiryaki, and with Matt Godden and Chris Dagnall putting them up 3–0 within the first half. Four more goals came in the second half from Robert Grant, Paul Reid, Mark Duffy and new signing Jordan Robertson.

=== Pre-season results ===
9 July Friendly	Bottesford Town	0–7	Scunthorpe United	Scunthorpe, Lincolnshire
15:00 BST		report	6' Tiryaki; 18' Godden; 23' Dagnall; 54' Grant; 65' Reid; 68' Duffy; 77' Robertson	Stadium: Birch Park; Attendance: 670

16 July Friendly	FC Halifax Town	1–0	Scunthorpe United	Halifax, West Yorkshire
15:00 BST	Hogan 89'	Report		Stadium: The Shay

24 July 2011 County Cup Final	Lincoln City	1–1 (4–3 p)	Scunthorpe United
15:00	Smith 17'		Dagnall 90'	Attendance: 1,769
	Penalties
	Taylor (penalty scored); Fuseini (penalty scored); O'Keefe (penalty missed); Nutter (penalty scored); Power (penalty scored)		Togwell (penalty missed); Collins (penalty scored); Duffy (penalty scored); Dagnall (penalty missed); Grant (penalty scored)

27 July Friendly	Rotherham United	0–2	Scunthorpe United	Sheffield, South Yorkshire
19:45 BST		Report	Ryan 9'; Grant 19' (pen.)	Stadium: Don Valley Stadium; Attendance: 702

30 July Friendly	Scunthorpe United	0–5	Barnsley	Scunthorpe, North Lincolnshire
15:00 BST		Report	Vaz Tê 7'; Davies 14', 33'; Reid 20'; Doyle 43'	Stadium: Glanford Park; Attendance: 1,432; Referee: Jon Moss

== Competitions ==
=== League One ===
==== Standings ====
Pos	Team	Pld	W	D	L	GF	GA	GD	Pts
16	Oldham Athletic	46	14	12	20	50	66	−16	54
17	Yeovil Town	46	14	12	20	59	80	−21	54
18	Scunthorpe United	46	10	22	14	55	59	−4	52
19	Walsall	46	10	20	16	51	57	−6	50
20	Leyton Orient	46	13	11	22	48	75	−27	50

Updated to match(es) played on 5 May 2012. Source: BBC Sport
Rules for classification: 1) Points; 2) Goal difference; 3) Number of goals scored

==== Results summary ====
Overall								Home						Away					
Pld	W	D	L	GF	GA	GD	Pts	W	D	L	GF	GA	GD	W	D	L	GF	GA	GD
46	10	22	14	55	59	−4	52	5	10	8	28	33	−5	5	12	6	27	26	+1

Last updated: 5 May 2012.

==== Result round by round ====
Round	1	2	3	4	5	6	7	8	9	10	11	12	13	14	15	16	17	18	19	20	21	22	23	24	25	26	27	28	29	30	31	32	33	34	35	36	37	38	39	40	41	42	43	44	45	46
Ground	A	H	H	A	A	H	H	A	A	H	A	H	A	A	H	H	A	H	A	H	A	H	H	A	A	H	H	H	A	H	H	H	A	A	A	H	A	H	A	H	A	H	A	H	H	A
Result	D	D	L	D	L	D	D	L	D	W	W	L	D	D	D	W	L	D	L	L	D	L	D	W	D	D	L	W	W	L	D	W	W	D	D	D	D	D	D	W	W	D	L	L	D	D
Position	13	15	20	19	20	19	17	21	21	16	15	16	17	16	16	15	17	18	19	20	20	22	20	18	19	19	20	20	20	21	21	18	18	18	18	18	18	18	17	17	14	14	16	17	17	18

==== Matches ====
6 August 1	Wycombe Wanderers	1–1	Scunthorpe United	High Wycombe, Buckinghamshire
15:00 BST	Tunnicliffe 23'	Report	Nelson 40'	Stadium: Adams Park; Attendance: 4,451; Referee: Rushton

13 August 2	Scunthorpe United	1–1	Preston North End	Scunthorpe, Lincolnshire
15:00 BST	Barcham 87'	Report	Hume 13'	Stadium: Glanford Park; Attendance: 4,675; Referee: Darren Drysdale

16 August 3	Scunthorpe United	1–2	Oldham Athletic	Scunthorpe, Lincolnshire
19:45 BST	Dagnall 63'	Report	Mellor 16'; Smith 82'	Stadium: Glanford Park; Attendance: 4,142; Referee: Coote

20 August 4	Charlton Athletic	2–2	Scunthorpe United	Charlton, Greater London
15:00 BST	Jackson 20'; Wright-Phillips 57'	Report	Grant 73', 90+1'	Stadium: The Valley; Attendance: 15,505; Referee: Sarginson

27 August 5	Sheffield Wednesday	3–2	Scunthorpe United	Sheffield, South Yorkshire
15:00 BST	Madine 5', 70'; Marshall 17'	Report	Grant 67'; Duffy 85'	Stadium: Hillsborough Stadium; Attendance: 16,862; Referee: Linington

3 September 6	Scunthorpe United	1–1	Colchester United	Scunthorpe, Lincolnshire
15:00 BST	Grant 38'	Report	Gillespie 74'	Stadium: Glanford Park; Attendance: 3,700; Referee: Miller

10 September 7	Scunthorpe United	1–1	Sheffield United	Scunthorpe, Lincolnshire
15:00 BST	Dagnall 45+1'	Report	Evans 72'	Stadium: Glanford Park; Attendance: 6,047; Referee: Miller

13 September 8	Rochdale	1–0	Scunthorpe United	Rochdale, Greater Manchester
19:45 BST	Kennedy 59'	Report		Stadium: Spotland Stadium; Attendance: 2,368; Referee: Geoff Eltringham

17 September 9	Walsall	2–2	Scunthorpe United	Walsall, West Midlands
15:00 BST	Chambers 22'; Grigg 83'	Report	Thompson 78'; Ryan 90+4'	Stadium: Bescot Stadium; Attendance: 3,619; Referee: Iain Williamson

24 September 10	Scunthorpe United	2–1	Yeovil Town	Scunthorpe, Lincolnshire
15:00 BST	Mizoka 44', 53'	Report	Wotton 45+3'	Stadium: Glanford Park; Attendance: 4,086; Referee: C Pawson

1 October 11	Stevenage	1–2	Scunthorpe United	Stevenage, Hertfordshire
15:00 BST	Walker 90+3'	Report	Nolan 45+2'; O'Connor 90+2'	Stadium: Broadhall Way; Attendance: 2,957; Referee: Keith Stroud

8 October 12	Scunthorpe United	2–3	Leyton Orient	Scunthorpe, Lincolnshire
15:00 BST	Barcham 31', 69'	Report	Lisbie 46', 50'; Cuthbert 67'	Stadium: Glanford Park; Attendance: 4,234; Referee: Mark Heywood

15 October 13	Brentford	0–0	Scunthorpe United	Hounslow, Greater London
15:00 BST		Report		Stadium: Griffin Park; Attendance: 4,907; Referee: R East

22 October 14	Milton Keynes Dons	0–0	Scunthorpe United	Milton Keynes, Buckinghamshire
15:00 BST		Report		Stadium: Stadium:mk; Attendance: 10,554; Referee: Paul Tierney

25 October 15	Scunthorpe United	2–2	Huddersfield Town	Scunthorpe, Lincolnshire
19:45 BST	Norwood 10'; Dagnall 88'	Report	Miller 25'; Rhodes 86'	Stadium: Glanford Park; Attendance: 5,858; Referee: Ilderton

29 October 16	Scunthorpe United	4–2	Tranmere Rovers	Scunthorpe, Lincolnshire
15:00 BST	Duffy 20'; Grant 44', 67' (pen.); Dagnall 52'	report	Tiryaki 4', 42'	Stadium: Glanford Park; Attendance: 4,282; Referee: Bobby Madley

5 November 17	Bournemouth	2–0	Scunthorpe United	Bournemouth, Dorset
15:00 GMT	Malone 20'; Thomas 73'	report		Stadium: Dean Court; Attendance: 5,478; Referee: Scott

19 November 18	Scunthorpe United	0–2	Hartlepool United	Scunthorpe, Lincolnshire
15:00 GMT		report	Monkhouse 21'; Sweeney 77'	Stadium: Glanford Park; Attendance: 3,861; Referee: Woolmer

26 November 19	Notts County	3–2	Scunthorpe United	Nottingham, Nottinghamshire
15:00 GMT	Pearce 39'; J Hughes 65'; Kelly 82'	report	Barcham 44'; Grant 53'; Norwood (red card) 57'	Stadium: Meadow Lane; Attendance: 6,120; Referee: Waugh

10 December 20	Scunthorpe United	1–2	Carlisle United	Scunthorpe, Lincolnshire
15:00 GMT	Barcham 3'	report	Berrett 64'; Zoko 90+1'	Stadium: Glanford Park; Attendance: 3,624; Referee: Darren Deadman

17 December 21	Exeter City	0–0	Scunthorpe United	Exeter, Devon
15:00 GMT		report		Stadium: St James Park; Attendance: 4,470; Referee: T Kettle

26 December 22	Scunthorpe United	1–3	Bury	Scunthorpe, Lincolnshire
15:00 GMT	O'Connor 5'	report	Sweeney 50'; Bishop 69'; Sodje 82'	Stadium: Glanford Park; Attendance: 4,569; Referee: Haywood

31 December 23	Scunthorpe United	2–2	Chesterfield	Scunthorpe, Lincolnshire
13:00 GMT	Canavan 24'; Ryan 90'	report	Boden 48'; Westcarr 70'	Stadium: Glanford Park; Attendance: 4,456; Referee: Haines

2 January 24	Hartlepool United	1–2	Scunthorpe United	Hartlepool, County Durham
15:00 GMT	Monkhouse 83'	report	Togwell 32'; Thompson 74'	Stadium: Victoria Park; Attendance: 5,289; Referee: Geoff Eltringham

14 January 25	Colchester United	1–1	Scunthorpe United	Colchester, Essex
15:00 GMT	Gillespie 28' (pen.)	report	Walker 8'	Stadium: Colchester Community Stadium; Attendance: 3,165; Referee: Phillips

21 January 26	Scunthorpe United	1–1	Stevenage	Scunthorpe, Lincolnshire
15:00 GMT	Thompson 47'	report	Charles 84'	Stadium: Glanford Park; Attendance: 3,968; Referee: Sarginson

24 January 27	Scunthorpe United	1–3	Sheffield Wednesday	Scunthorpe, Lincolnshire
19:45 GMT	Robertson 55'	report	O'Grady 1', 18'; J Johnson 47'	Stadium: Glanford Park; Attendance: 5,727; Referee: Bates

14 February 28	Scunthorpe United	1–0	Rochdale	Scunthorpe, Lincolnshire
19:45 GMT	Thompson 64'	report		Stadium: Glanford Park; Attendance: 3,409; Referee: Bobby Madley

18 February 29	Leyton Orient	1–3	Scunthorpe United	Leyton, London
15:00 GMT	Téhoué 34'	report	Walker 61'; Barcham 85'; Parkin 89'	Stadium: Matchroom Stadium; Attendance: 4,055; Referee: Sheldrake

21 February 30	Scunthorpe United	0–1	Walsall	Scunthorpe, Lincolnshire
19:45 GMT		report	Cuvelier 34'	Stadium: Glanford Park; Attendance: 3,455; Referee: Webb

25 February 31	Scunthorpe United	0–0	Brentford	Scunthorpe, Lincolnshire
15:00 GMT		report		Stadium: Glanford Park; Attendance: 3,884; Referee: Rushton

29 February 32	Sheffield United	2–1	Scunthorpe United	Sheffield, South Yorkshire
19:45 GMT	Williamson 54'; Quinn 82'	report	Duffy 31'	Stadium: Bramall Lane; Attendance: 16,165; Referee: Tierney

3 March 33	Scunthorpe United	4–1	Wycombe Wanderers	Scunthorpe, Lincolnshire
15:00 GMT	Reid 5'; Barcham 34', 47'; Parkin 55'	report	McClure 86'	Stadium: Glanford Park; Attendance: 3,811; Referee: Madley

7 March 34	Oldham Athletic	1–2	Scunthorpe United	Oldham, Greater Manchester
19:45 GMT	Morais 78'	report	Mirfin 73'; Thompson 80'	Stadium: Boundary Park; Attendance: 4,376; Referee: Adcock

10 March 35	Preston North End	0–0	Scunthorpe United	Preston, Lancashire
15:00 GMT		report		Stadium: Deepdale; Attendance: 10,621; Referee: Scott

13 March 36	Yeovil Town	2–2	Scunthorpe United	Yeovil, Somerset
19:45 GMT	G Williams 30'; Franks 68'	report	Parkin 53', 90'	Stadium: Huish Park; Attendance: 3,767; Referee: Danny McDermid

17 March 37	Scunthorpe United	1–1	Charlton Athletic	Scunthorpe, Lincolnshire
15:00 GMT	Parkin 21' (pen.)	report	Wright-Phillips 6'	Stadium: Glanford Park; Attendance: 4,544; Referee: Lewis

20 March 38	Bury	0–0	Scunthorpe United	Bury, Greater Manchester
19:45 GMT		report	Walker (red card) 31'	Stadium: Gigg Lane Stadium; Attendance: 2,351; Referee: Sutton

24 March 39	Scunthorpe United	0–0	Notts County	Scunthorpe, Lincolnshire
15:00 GMT		report		Stadium: Glanford Park; Attendance: 4,619; Referee: Mohareb

31 March 40	Chesterfield	1–4	Scunthorpe United	Chesterfield, Derbyshire
15:00 GMT	Westcarr 21'	report	Robertson 28', 75'; Walker 65'; Barcham 81'	Stadium: B2net Stadium; Attendance: 6,152; Referee: Haines

6 April 41	Scunthorpe United	1–0	Exeter City	Scunthorpe, Lincolnshire
15:00 UTC	Parkin 76'	report		Stadium: Glanford Park; Attendance: 4,361; Referee: Attwell

9 April 42	Carlisle United	0–0	Scunthorpe United	Carlisle, Cumbria
15:00 UTC		report		Stadium: Brunton Park; Attendance: 6,555; Referee: Waugh

14 April 43	Scunthorpe United	0–3	Milton Keynes Dons	Scunthorpe, Lincolnshire
15:00 UTC		report	Bowditch 11'; Powell 54'; William 85'	Stadium: Glanford Park; Attendance: 4,111; Referee: Berry

21 April 44	Huddersfield Town	1–0	Scunthorpe United	Huddersfield, West Yorkshire
15:00 UTC	Novak 89'	report		Stadium: Galpharm Stadium; Attendance: 13,086; Referee: Woolmer

28 April 45	Scunthorpe United	1–1	Bournemouth	Scunthorpe, Lincolnshire
15:00 UTC	Ryan (yellow card) 73'; Thompson 79'; Byrne (yellow card) 90'	Summary	McDermott 42'; Zubar (yellow card) 90'	Stadium: Glanford Park; Attendance: 4,422; Referee: Ward

5 May 46	Tranmere Rovers	1–1	Scunthorpe United	Tranmere, Merseyside
15:00 UTC	McChrystal 27'; Goodison (yellow card) 60'	Summary	Thompson 61'	Stadium: Prenton Park; Attendance: 4,952; Referee: Michael Oliver

=== FA Cup ===
12 November First round	AFC Wimbledon	0–0	Scunthorpe United	Kingston upon Thames, London
15:00 GMT		report		Stadium: The Cherry Red Records Stadium; Attendance: 2,933; Referee: Whitestone

22 November First round replay	Scunthorpe United	0–1	AFC Wimbledon	Scunthorpe, Lincolnshire
19:45 GMT			L Moore	Stadium: Glanford Park; Attendance: 2,036; Referee: Salisbury

=== League Cup ===
9 August First round	Accrington Stanley	0–2	Scunthorpe United	Accrington, Lancashire
19:45 BST	Dagnall 82' (pen.); Barcham 90+3'	Report		Stadium: Crown Ground; Attendance: 1,356; Referee: Langford

25 August Second round	Scunthorpe United	1–2 (a.e.t.)	Newcastle United	Scunthorpe, Lincolnshire
19:45 BST	Dagnall 15'	report	R Taylor 80'; Sammy Ameobi 112'	Stadium: Glanford Park; Attendance: 4,408; Referee: Salisbury

=== League Trophy ===
31 August First round	Scunthorpe United	2–0	Hartlepool United	Scunthorpe, Lincolnshire
19:45 BST	Grant 59', 66'	report		Stadium: Glanford Park; Attendance: 1,763; Referee: Madley

4 October Second round	Scunthorpe United	0–1	Oldham Athletic	Scunthorpe, Lincolnshire
19:45 BST	Kuqi 26'	report		Stadium: Glanford Park; Attendance: 2,106; Referee: Boyeson

== Squad ==
Note: Flags indicate national team as defined under FIFA eligibility rules; some limited exceptions apply. Players may hold more than one non-FIFA nationality.

No.	Pos.	Nation	Player
1	GK	ENG	Josh Lillis
2	MF	ENG	Andrew Wright
3	DF	IRL	Eddie Nolan
4	MF	ENG	Sam Togwell
5	DF	ENG	David Mirfin (on loan from Watford)
6	DF	IRL	Cliff Byrne (captain)
7	MF	IRL	Jimmy Ryan
8	MF	NIR	Michael O'Connor
9	FW	ENG	Jon Parkin (on loan from Cardiff City)
10	FW	ENG	Jordan Robertson
11	MF	ENG	Garry Thompson
12	MF	FRA	Damien Mozika
13	GK	ENG	Sam Slocombe
14	MF	ENG	Josh Walker (on loan from Watford)

No.	Pos.	Nation	Player
15	DF	ENG	Paul Reid
16	MF	ENG	Mark Duffy
17	FW	ENG	Bobby Grant (on loan at Accrington Stanley)
18	MF	IRL	Michael Collins
19	DF	IRL	Niall Canavan
20	FW	ENG	Matt Godden
21	MF	ENG	Andy Barcham
22	MF	IRL	Robbie Gibbons
23	FW	ENG	Aron Wint (on loan at Belper Town)
24	DF	ENG	Ashley Palmer
25	FW	ENG	Jamie Reckord (on loan from Wolverhampton Wanderers)
26	FW	ENG	Conor McAleny (on loan from Everton)
28	FW	ENG	Connor Jennings

=== Statistics ===
As of 28 April 2012

No.	Pos	Nat	Player	Total		League One		FA Cup		League Cup		League Trophy	
No.	Pos	Nat	Player	Apps	Goals	Apps	Goals	Apps	Goals	Apps	Goals	Apps	Goals
1	GK	(England) ENG	Josh Lillis	9	0	6+0	0	0+0	0	2+0	0	1+0	0
2	MF	(England) ENG	Andrew Wright	24	0	14+4	0	2+0	0	2+0	0	1+1	0
3	DF	(Republic of Ireland) IRL	Eddie Nolan	35	1	28+1	1	2+0	0	2+0	0	2+0	0
4	MF	(England) ENG	Sam Togwell	43	1	35+3	1	2+0	0	2+0	0	1+0	0
5	DF	(England) ENG	David Mirfin	18	1	18+0	1	0+0	0	0+0	0	0+0	0
6	DF	(Republic of Ireland) IRL	Cliff Byrne	13	0	12+1	0	0+0	0	0+0	0	0+0	0
7	MF	(Republic of Ireland) IRL	Jimmy Ryan	25	2	18+4	2	0+0	0	2+0	0	0+1	0
8	MF	(Northern Ireland) NIR	Michael O'Connor	36	2	29+4	2	2+0	0	0+0	0	1+0	0
9	FW	(England) ENG	Jon Parkin	14	6	13+1	6	0+0	0	0+0	0	0+0	0
10	FW	(England) ENG	Jordan Robertson	19	3	12+6	3	0+0	0	0+1	0	0+0	0
11	MF	(England) ENG	Garry Thompson	44	6	18+20	6	0+2	0	1+1	0	2+0	0
12	MF	(France) FRA	Damien Mozika	18	2	16+1	2	0+0	0	0+0	0	0+1	0
13	GK	(England) ENG	Sam Slocombe	28	0	26+0	0	2+0	0	0+0	0	0+0	0
14	MF	(England) ENG	Josh Walker	18	3	17+1	3	0+0	0	0+0	0	0+0	0
15	DF	(England) ENG	Paul Reid	38	1	36+0	1	0+0	0	1+0	0	1+0	0
16	MF	(England) ENG	Mark Duffy	42	1	26+10	1	2+0	0	1+1	0	1+1	0
17	FW	(England) ENG	Bobby Grant	34	9	18+10	7	2+0	0	1+1	0	2+0	2
18	MF	(Republic of Ireland) IRL	Michael Collins	3	0	0+1	0	0+0	0	1+0	0	1+0	0
19	DF	(Republic of Ireland) IRL	Niall Canavan	14	1	10+1	1	2+0	0	1+0	0	0+0	0
20	FW	(England) ENG	Matt Godden	0	0	0+0	0	0+0	0	0+0	0	0+0	0
21	MF	(England) ENG	Andy Barcham	45	10	36+4	9	1+0	0	1+1	1	2+0	0
22	MF	(Republic of Ireland) IRL	Robbie Gibbons	3	0	2+1	0	0+0	0	0+0	0	0+0	0
23	FW	(England) ENG	Aron Wint	1	0	0+0	0	0+0	0	0+0	0	0+1	0
24	DF	(England) ENG	Ashley Palmer	2	0	0+1	0	0+0	0	0+0	0	1+0	0
26	FW	(England) ENG	Conor McAleny	3	0	2+1	0	0+0	0	0+0	0	0+0	0
28	FW	(England) ENG	Connor Jennings	3	0	0+3	0	0+0	0	0+0	0	0+0	0
29	GK	(England) ENG	Neil Cutler	0	0	0+0	0	0+0	0	0+0	0	0+0	0
Players featured for club who have left:
	FW	(England) ENG	Nicky Ajose	9	0	2+5	0	1+0	0	0+0	0	1+0	0
	FW	(England) ENG	Chris Dagnall	27	6	19+4	4	2+0	0	2+0	2	0+0	0
	DF	(Republic of Ireland) IRL	Shane Duffy	19	1	18+0	1	0+0	0	0+0	0	1+0	0
	GK	(England) ENG	Sam Johnstone	13	0	12+0	0	0+0	0	0+0	0	1+0	0
	DF	(England) ENG	Michael Nelson	16	1	8+2	1	2+0	0	2+0	0	2+0	0
	MF	(Northern Ireland) NIR	Oliver Norwood	18	1	14+1	1	0+1	0	1+0	0	1+0	0
	FW	(England) ENG	Jamie Reckord	17	0	17+0	0	0+0	0	0+0	0	0+0	0
	DF	(Wales) WAL	Christian Ribeiro	8	0	8+0	0	0+0	0	0+0	0	0+0	0

==== Goalscoring record ====
N	P	Name	League One	FA Cup	League Cup	JP Trophy	Total
21	FW	Andy Barcham	9	0	1	0	10
17	FW	Bobby Grant	7	0	0	2	9
~~9~~	FW	Chris Dagnall	6	0	0	0	6
9	FW	Jon Parkin	6	0	0	0	6
11	MF	Garry Thompson	6	0	0	0	6
10	FW	Jordan Robertson	3	0	0	0	3
14	MF	Josh Walker	3	0	0	0	3
12	MF	Damien Mozika	2	0	0	0	2
8	MF	Michael O'Connor	2	0	0	0	2
7	MF	Jimmy Ryan	2	0	0	0	2
19	DF	Niall Canavan	1	0	0	0	1
16	MF	Mark Duffy	1	0	0	0	1
~~26~~	DF	Shane Duffy	1	0	0	0	1
5	DF	David Mirfin	1	0	0	0	1
~~5~~	DF	Michael Nelson	1	0	0	0	1
3	DF	Eddie Nolan	1	0	0	0	1
~~14~~	MF	Oliver Norwood	1	0	0	0	1
15	DF	Paul Reid	1	0	0	0	1
4	MF	Sam Togwell	1	0	0	0	1
Totals			56	0	1	2	59

==== Disciplinary record ====
No.	Pos.	Name	League One		FA Cup		League Cup		League Trophy		Total	
No.	Pos.	Name	Yellow card	Red card	Yellow card	Red card	Yellow card	Red card	Yellow card	Red card	Yellow card	Red card
8	MF	Michael O'Connor	7	1	0	0	0	0	0	0	7	1
4	MF	Sam Togwell	5	1	0	0	1	0	0	0	6	1
17	FW	Bobby Grant	5	1	0	0	0	0	0	0	5	1
14	MF	Josh Walker	3	1	0	0	0	0	0	0	3	1
16	MF	Mark Duffy	2	1	0	0	0	0	0	0	2	1
2	DF	Andrew Wright	2	1	0	0	1	0	0	0	3	1
10	FW	Jordan Robertson	2	1	0	0	0	0	0	0	2	1
21	FW	Andy Barcham	1	1	0	0	0	0	0	0	1	1
3	DF	Eddie Nolan	6	0	0	0	0	0	0	0	6	0
15	DF	Paul Reid	5	0	0	0	0	0	0	0	5	0
19	DF	Niall Canavan	4	0	0	0	0	0	0	0	4	0
9	FW	Jon Parkin	4	0	0	0	0	0	0	0	4	0
11	MF	Garry Thompson	4	0	0	0	0	0	0	0	4	0
6	DF	Cliff Byrne	3	0	0	0	0	0	0	0	3	0
~~9~~	FW	Chris Dagnall	2	0	1	0	0	0	0	0	3	0
12	MF	Damien Mozika	3	0	0	0	0	0	0	0	3	0
~~14~~	MF	Oliver Norwood	2	0	0	0	0	0	1	0	3	0
7	MF	Jimmy Ryan	3	0	0	0	0	0	0	0	3	0
~~26~~	DF	Shane Duffy	2	0	0	0	0	0	0	0	2	0
1	GK	Josh Lillis	2	0	0	0	0	0	0	0	2	0
5	DF	David Mirfin	2	0	0	0	0	0	0	0	2	0
~~5~~	DF	Michael Nelson	0	0	1	0	1	0	0	0	2	0
26	FW	Conor McAleny	1	0	0	0	0	0	0	0	1	0
25	DF	Jamie Reckord	1	0	0	0	0	0	0	0	1	0
~~26~~	DF	Christian Ribeiro	1	0	0	0	0	0	0	0	'1	0
13	GK	Sam Slocombe	1	0	0	0	0	0	0	0	1	0
Totals			73	7	2	0	3	0	0	0	78	7

==== Suspensions served ====
Date	Matches missed	Player	Reason	Opponents missed
3 September	1	Bobby Grant	(yellow card) (yellow-red card) vs Colchester United	Sheffield United (H)
10 September	3	Andy Barcham	(red card) vs Sheffield United	Rochdale (A), Walsall (A), Yeovil Town (H)
15 October	3	Andrew Wright	(red card) vs Brentford	MK Dons (A), Huddersfield Town (H), Tranmere Rovers (H)
26 November	3	Oliver Norwood	(red card) vs Notts County	Carlisle(H), Exeter(A), Bury (H)
3 March	3	Michael O'Connor	(red card) vs Wycombe Wanderers	Oldham (A), Preston (A), Yeovil (A)
7 March	1	Josh Walker	(yellow card) (yellow-red card) vs Oldham Athletic	Preston North End (A)
20 March	3	Mark Duffy	(red card) vs Bury	Notts County (H), Chesterfield (A), Exeter City (H)
14 April	3	Jordan Robertson	(red card) vs MK Dons	Huddersfield (A), Bournemouth (H), Tranmere (A)

== Transfers ==
=== In ===
No.	Pos.	Nat.	Name	Age	EU	Moving from	Type	Transfer window	Ends	Transfer fee	Source
10	FW	(England)	Robertson	23	EU	St Johnstone (Scotland)	Free Transfer	Summer	2012	Free	Scunthorpe United
21	MF	(England)	Barcham	24	EU	Gillingham	Free Transfer	Summer	2013	Free	Scunthorpe United
7	MF	(Republic of Ireland) (England)	Ryan	22	EU	Accrington Stanley	Bosman Transfer	Summer	2013	£55,000^{1}	Sky Sports
12	MF	(France)	Mozika	24	EU	Bury	Transfer	Summer	2014	Undisclosed	BBC Football
28	FW	(England)	Jennings	20	EU	Stalybridge Celtic	Transfer	Summer	2014	Undisclosed	BBC Sport
22	MF	(Republic of Ireland)	Gibbons	20	EU	Ermis Aradippou (Cyprus)	Free Transfer	Winter	2012	Free	BBC Sport

Notes
^{1}£55,000 must be paid immediately, £25,000 to be paid if Scunthorpe are promoted in the next two years and appearances related fees, means that Accrington Stanley will receive up to £195,000.

=== Loans in ===
No.	Pos.	Name	Country	Age	Loan club	Started	Ended	Start source	End source
14	MF	Norwood	(Northern Ireland) (England)	20	Manchester United	24 August	11 January	Man Utd Official Site	Sky Sports
26	DF	Duffy	(Republic of Ireland) (Northern Ireland)	20	Everton	1 September	5 January	Sky Sports	Sky Sports
27	GK	Johnstone	(England)	18	Manchester United	9 September	11 January	Sky Sports	Sky Sports
28	FW	Ajose	(England)	20	Peterborough United	22 September	29 November	Sky Sports	Soccerbase
26	DF	Ribeiro	(Wales)	22	Bristol City	11 January	22 March		Sky Sports
14	MF	Walker	(England)	37	Watford	13 January		BBC Sport	
5	DF	Mirfin	(England)	27	Watford	23 January	30 May	BBC Sport	
9	FW	Parkin	(England)	30	Cardiff City	23 January	30 May	BBC Sport	
25	DF	Reckord	(England)	20	Wolverhampton Wanderers	30 January	1 May	Wolves Official Site	Scunthorpe Official Site
26	FW	McAleny	(England)	19	Everton	24 March	30 May	Scunthorpe Official Site	

Sources: For loan start source see "Start source". For loan end source see "End source".
EU = if holds or not a European Union passport; Country: when 2 flags, 1st flag = country that plays for internationally, 2nd flag = country of birth; No. = number on jersey; P = Position (for position name, pause mouse pointer on abbreviation); Name = Name on jersey (for more extensive name, pause mouse pointer on name); In/Out = In: The player came in on loan, Out: The player went out on loan; Loan club = the club that the player moved on loan to or the club that the player came from on loan; Started = the date when the player's loan started; Ended = the date when the player's loan ended.

=== Out ===
No.	Pos.	Name	Country	Age	Type	Moving to	Transfer window	Transfer fee	Apps	Goals	Source
23	DF	Coleman	(England)	Unknown	Released		Summer	N/A	0	0	BBC Sport
32	FW	Cowan-Hall	(England)	20	Out of Contract	Woking	Summer	N/A	1	0	BBC Sport
15	MF	Mirfin	(England)	26	Out of Contract	Watford	Summer	Free	111	5	BBC Sport
27	MF	Morris	(Republic of Ireland)	24	Out of Contract	Torquay United	Summer	N/A	92	6	BBC Sport
16	MF	J Wright	(England)	21	Out of Contract	Millwall	Summer	N/A	81	1	BBC Sport
5	DF	Jones	(England)	31	Free Transfer	Sheffield Wednesday	Summer	Free	48	2	Scunthorpe United
26	DF	Williams	(England)	19	Free Transfer	Gainsborough Trinity	Summer	Free	0	0	Scunthorpe United
1	GK	Murphy	(Republic of Ireland)	29	Free Transfer	Coventry City	Summer	Free	227	0	BBC Sport
10	DF	Hughes	(England)	33	Free Transfer	Charlton Athletic	Summer	Free	19	0	BBC Sport
	DF	Raynes	(England)	23	Transfer	Rotherham United	Summer	Undisclosed	12	0	BBC Sport
22	GK	Turner	(England)	18	Loan	Brigg Town	Summer	One-month Loan	0	0	Sky Sports
9	FW	Dagnall	(England)	25	Transfer	Barnsley	Winter	Undisclosed	68	13	BBC Sport
5	DF	Nelson	(England)	31	Transfer	Kilmarnock (Scotland)	Winter	Free	36	1	Sky Sports

EU = if holds or not a European Union passport; Country: when 2 flags, 1st flag = country that plays for internationally, 2nd flag = country of birth; N = number on jersey; P = Position (for position name, pause mouse pointer on abbreviation); Name = Name on jersey (for more extensive name, pause mouse pointer on name); Age = age on the day of the signing; Moving from = only indicate the club the player was playing before start playing for this club in this season, for the type of the moving see Status column; Moving to = only indicates the club the player is going to play next, for the type of the moving see Status column; Ends = when the player's current contract ends; n/a = Not applicable; Apps = Total number of competitive appearances (including substitute appearances) at the club prior to departure; Goals = Total number of competitive goals scored at the club prior to departure.

=== Loans out ===
No.	Pos.	Name	Country	Age	Loan club	Started	Ended	Start source	End source
20	FW	Godden	(England)	20	Gainsborough Trinity	9 March	16 April	Scunthorpe Official Site	Scunthorpe Official Site
24	DF	Palmer	(England)	19	Harrogate Town	9 March	16 April	Scunthorpe Official Site	Scunthorpe Official Site
17	FW	Grant	(England)	21	Accrington Stanley	15 March	18 April	Sky Sports	Sky Sports
2	DF	Wright	(England)	27	Grimsby Town	22 March	17 April	Grimsby Official Site	Scunthorpe Official Site
23	FW	Wint	(England)	19	FC Halifax Town	2 March	16 April	Scunthorpe Official Site	Scunthorpe Official Site

Sources: For loan start source see "Start source". For loan end source see "End source".
EU = if holds or not a European Union passport; Country: when 2 flags, 1st flag = country that plays for internationally, 2nd flag = country of birth; No. = number on jersey; P = Position (for position name, pause mouse pointer on abbreviation); Name = Name on jersey (for more extensive name, pause mouse pointer on name); In/Out = In: The player came in on loan, Out: The player went out on loan; Loan club = the club that the player moved on loan to or the club that the player came from on loan; Started = the date when the player's loan started; Ended = the date when the player's loan ended.

== Overall summary ==
=== Summary ===
Games played	52 (46 League One, 2 FA Cup, 2 League Cup, 2 League Trophy)
Games won	12 (10 League One, 0FA Cup, 1 League Cup, 1 League Trophy)
Games drawn	23 (22 League One, 1 FA Cup, 0 League Cup, 0 League Trophy)
Games lost	17 (14 League One, 1 FA Cup, 1 League Cup, 1 League Trophy)
Goals scored	60 (55 League One, 0 FA Cup, 3 League Cup, 2 League Trophy)
Goals conceded	62 (59 League One, 0 FA Cup, 2 League Cup, 1 League Trophy)
Goal difference	-2
Clean sheets	12 (9 League One, 1 FA Cup, 1 League Cup, 1 League Trophy)
Yellow cards	78 (73 League One, 2 FA Cup, 1 League Cup, 1 League Trophy)
Red cards	7 (7 League One, 0 League Cup, 0 League Trophy)
Worst discipline	Michael O'Connor (7 (yellow card) , 1 (red card) )
Best result	4–1 vs Chesterfield (A) & Wycombe Wanderers (H)
Worst result	0–2 vs Bournemouth (A) & Hartlepool United (H)
Most appearances	Garry Thompson (44)
Top scorer	Andy Barcham (9 goals)
Points	52

=== Score overview ===
Opposition	Home score	Away score	Double
Bournemouth	1–1	0–2	No
Brentford	0–0	0–0	No
Bury	1–3	0–0	No
Carlisle United	1–2	0–0	No
Charlton Athletic	2–2	1–1	No
Chesterfield	2–2	4–1	No
Colchester United	1–1	1–1	No
Exeter City	1–0	0–0	No
Hartlepool United	0–2	2–1	No
Huddersfield Town	2–2	0–1	No
Leyton Orient	2–3	3–1	No
Milton Keynes Dons	0–3	0–0	No
Notts County	0–0	2–3	No
Oldham Athletic	1–2	2–1	No
Preston North End	1–1	0–0	No
Rochdale	1–0	0–1	No
Sheffield United	1–1	1–2	No
Sheffield Wednesday	1–3	2–3	No
Stevenage	1–1	2–1	No
Tranmere Rovers	4–2	1–1	No
Walsall	0–1	2–2	No
Wycombe Wanderers	4–1	1–1	No
Yeovil Town	2–1	2–2	No
