= Connor Jennings =

English footballer (born 1991)

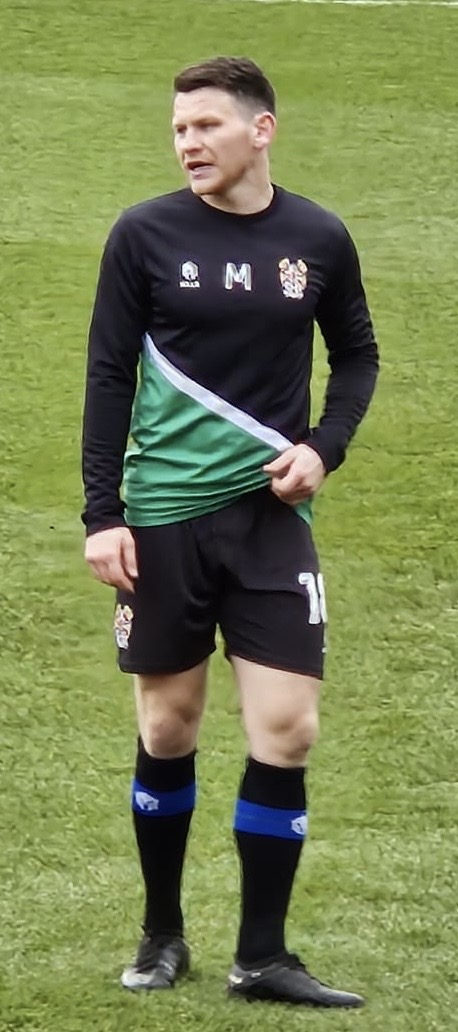
- Jennings with Tranmere Rovers in 2023

Personal information
- Full name: Connor Joseph Jennings
- Date of birth: 29 October 1991 (age 35)
- Place of birth: Manchester, England
- Height: 6 ft 0 in (1.83 m)
- Position: Forward

Team information
- Current team: Tranmere Rovers
- Number: 18

Youth career
- 2005–2009: Stalybridge Celtic

Senior career*
Years	Team	Apps	(Gls)
2009–2012	Stalybridge Celtic	103	(44)
2012–2014	Scunthorpe United	16	(0)
2012–2013	→ Stockport County (loan)	13	(4)
2013	→ Macclesfield Town (loan)	16	(14)
2014	→ Grimsby Town (loan)	12	(1)
2014–2016	Wrexham	86	(20)
2016–2020	Tranmere Rovers	140	(27)
2017	→ Macclesfield Town (loan)	5	(1)
2020–2023	Stockport County	41	(5)
2022–2023	→ Altrincham (loan)	9	(1)
2023	Hartlepool United	18	(4)
2023–	Tranmere Rovers	116	(20)

International career
2011	England C	1	(1)
- * Club domestic league appearances and goals as of 00:45, 3 May 2026 (UTC)

Connor Joseph Jennings (born 29 October 1991) is an English professional footballer who plays as a forward for EFL League Two club Tranmere Rovers.

Jennings started his career with Stalybridge Celtic in the 2008–09 season, staying with them until halfway through 2011–12, where he scored over 50 goals in over 100 games, before moving on to Scunthorpe United. He has since played for Stockport County, Macclesfield Town, Grimsby Town, Wrexham, Altrincham and Hartlepool United.

He played once for the England national C team, scoring one goal.

== Club career ==
=== Stalybridge Celtic ===
Jennings was born in Manchester, Greater Manchester. He rose through the youth team at Stalybridge Celtic and made his debut for the club, on 3 March 2009, coming on as a substitute and scoring in a 7–1 victory over Hinckley United. He scored his second and third goals for the club as part of a 4–0 win over Burscough in April 2009. He started off the 2009–10 season well scoring once in August, as Celtic won 3–1 at home to Vauxhall Motors. He finished that season with 11 goals in all competitions. He got his 2010–11 season of to a good start by scoring in a 2–1 defeat to Nuneaton Town. This turned out to be his most prolific season yet, scoring 18 goals, including two brace's towards the end of the season, against Gloucester City and Vauxhall Motors.

After a prolific season in 2010–11, he got his 2011–12 season of to a great start, scoring five goals in August. He went on to score ten goals in the next three months, including brace's against Altrincham and Worcester City. In December 2011, he scored another brace, hitting both of Celtic's goals in a 2–2 draw with Stockport County in the FA Trophy. He followed that up by scoring a stoppage time winner in the replay at Bower Fold as his team won 2–1. On 1 January 2012, he scored his last goal on his last appearance for Stalybridge in stoppage time, scoring a penalty, which he won himself, his team lost the match 3–1 to rivals Hyde. He scored 51 goals in 123 matches in all competitions, in his time at Stalybridge.

=== Scunthorpe United ===
Jennings signed for League One team Scunthorpe United on 5 January 2012 on a two-and-a-half-year contract for an undisclosed fee. He made his debut on 14 January, coming on as a 70th-minute substitute in a 1–1 draw at Colchester United. He scored his first goal for the club in a 5–5 draw with Derby County in the League Cup on 14 August 2012.

After 14 appearances for Scunthorpe in 2012–13, scoring one goal, he was loaned out to Conference Premier team Stockport County on 16 November 2012. He made his debut the day after, as his team lost 2–0 away to Nuneaton Town.

Jennings joined Macclesfield Town on loan at the start of 2013–14, initially until January. He returned to Scunthorpe on 15 December 2013 because of a calf injury.

On 28 February 2014, Jennings joined Conference Premier club Grimsby Town on an initial one-month loan. On 25 March 2014, Jennings extended his loan with Grimsby until the end of 2013–14.

=== Wrexham ===
On 11 July 2014, Jennings signed for Wrexham. He started in the 2015 FA Trophy final at Wembley Stadium, however, Wrexham would miss out on penalties to North Ferriby. Jennings was named as the Wrexham Player of the Year for the 2015–16 season after making 48 appearances and scoring 14 goals.

=== Tranmere Rovers ===
On 2 June 2016, Jennings joined Wrexham's National League rivals Tranmere Rovers on a two-year contract. Jennings' Tranmere career got off to a slow start, making just 11 appearances by January. Jennings was then loaned out to fellow National League club Macclesfield Town for whom he played 5 games, scoring 1 goal. Jennings returned to Tranmere in March and went on to establish himself as a first team regular until the end of the season, Jennings' stint in the side coincided with an excellent run of form for Tranmere which saw them narrowly miss out on the National League title. Jennings managed 6 goals in April 2017, 3 of which came in a 9–0 victory over Solihull Moors.

Jennings scored against Forest Green in the 2017 National League play-off final. His rising finish from distance was not enough to stop Tranmere's first Wembley appearance in 17 years ending in a 3–1 defeat.

In the 2018 National League play-off final, Jennings crossed for James Norwood to score the winning goal in Tranmere's 2–1 win over Boreham Wood.

He signed a new two-year contract with the club in May 2018.

In the 2019 League Two play-off final, Jennings scored the only goal of the game as Tranmere beat Newport County 1–0.

=== Stockport County ===
After leaving Tranmere, Jennings signed for Stockport County on 16 July 2020. In March 2021, it was announced that Jennings had been diagnosed with a rare form of bone cancer, chondrosarcoma. Eight months after his diagnosis, Jennings came on a substitute in a 5–0 win against King's Lynn Town, scoring the final goal in the 91st minute.

On 7 November 2022, Jennings joined Altrincham on a one-month loan deal. This deal was then extended by a further month.

=== Hartlepool United ===
On 31 January 2023, Jennings signed for League Two side Hartlepool United on a permanent deal. He played 18 games for Hartlepool, scoring four times in his time with the club.

=== Return to Tranmere Rovers ===
On 19 June 2023, Jennings signed a one-year contract at League Two club Tranmere Rovers making it a second spell at the club. On 23 November 2023, Jennings signed a one-year contract extension with Tranmere until the end of June 2025.

On 27 January 2026, Jennings suffered injuries to his ACL, MCL, and meniscus, ruling him out for a long period of time. On 29 January 2026, the club offered him a one‑year contract extension to support him during his recovery. In late February, Jennings had successful Knee Surgery. On 4th March, following the sacking of Andy Crosby, Jennings agreed to work with the coaching staff, alongside Joe Murphy, on an interim basis, until 10 March 2026.

== International career ==
He was selected to play for the England national C team against Gibraltar in November 2011, and he scored his first and England's only goal in that game, coming on as a 46th-minute substitute for Barrow's Adam Boyes.

== Style of play ==
Jennings who plays as a striker, has been described as 'pacey'. He was also described as a 'stylish' player with an 'eye for goal'. On his arrival at Scunthorpe United, manager Alan Knill said about Jennings, "Technically, he is very good and very quick" he also added "Jennings can play in a number of positions and not just at Centre Forward".

== Personal life ==
Connor's older brother, James, is a former footballer who played as a defender.

In 2025, Connor became patron of Wirral based disability support and social isolation charity, I Am Phab Wirral.

== Career statistics ==
As of match played 27 January 2026

Appearances and goals by club, season and competition
Club	Season	League			FA Cup		League Cup		Other		Total	
Club	Season	Division	Apps	Goals	Apps	Goals	Apps	Goals	Apps	Goals	Apps	Goals
Stalybridge Celtic	2008–09	Conference North	8	3	0	0	—		0	0	8	3
Stalybridge Celtic	2009–10	Conference North	36	10	3	1	—		4 (Note: One appearance in Cheshire Senior Cup, three in FA Trophy)	0	43	11
Stalybridge Celtic	2010–11	Conference North	36	16	4	0	—		3 (Note: Appearance(s) in FA Trophy)	2	43	18
Stalybridge Celtic	2011–12	Conference North	23	15	1	0	—		5 (Note: Two appearances in Cheshire Senior Cup, three appearances and four goals in FA Trophy)	4	29	19
Stalybridge Celtic	Total		103	44	8	1	—		12	6	123	51
Scunthorpe United	2011–12	League One	4	0	—		—		—		4	0
Scunthorpe United	2012–13	League One	12	0	1	0	2	1	1 (Note: Appearance in Football League Trophy)	0	16	1
Scunthorpe United	2013–14	League Two	0	0	—		—		—		0	0
Scunthorpe United	Total		16	0	1	0	2	1	1	0	20	1
Stockport County (loan)	2012–13	Conference Premier	13	4	—		—		3	4	16	8
Macclesfield Town (loan)	2013–14	Conference Premier	16	14	3	3	—		—		19	17
Grimsby Town (loan)	2013–14	Conference Premier	12	1	—		—		—		12	1
Wrexham	2014–15	Conference Premier	41	6	4	1	—		9	2	54	9
Wrexham	2015–16	National League	45	14	1	0	—		2	0	48	14
Wrexham	Total		86	20	5	1	—		11	2	102	23
Tranmere Rovers	2016–17	National League	23	7	0	0	—		6 (Note: Three appearances in FA Trophy, three appearances and one goal in National League play-offs)	1	29	8
Tranmere Rovers	2017–18	National League	43	8	3	1	—		2 (Note: One appearance in FA Trophy, one in National League play-offs)	0	48	9
Tranmere Rovers	2018–19	League Two	45	8	5	4	0	0	5 (Note: Two appearances in EFL Trophy, three appearances and one goal in League Two play-offs)	1	55	13
Tranmere Rovers	2019–20	League One	29	4	6	1	1	0	3 (Note: Appearances in EFL Trophy)	2	39	7
Tranmere Rovers	Total		140	27	14	6	1	0	16	4	171	37
Macclesfield Town (loan)	2016–17	National League	5	1	—		—		—		5	1
Stockport County	2020–21	National League	17	2	4	1	—		2	0	23	3
Stockport County	2021–22	National League	17	3	1	0	—		5	2	23	5
Stockport County	2022–23	League Two	7	0	1	0	2	1	3	1	13	2
Stockport County	Total		41	5	6	1	2	1	10	3	59	10
Altrincham (loan)	2022–23	National League	9	1	0	0	0	0	1	0	10	1
Hartlepool United	2022–23	League Two	18	4	0	0	0	0	0	0	18	4
Tranmere Rovers	2023–24	League Two	44	12	1	0	2	0	1	0	48	12
Tranmere Rovers	2024–25	League Two	44	4	1	1	2	0	3	0	50	5
Tranmere Rovers	2025–26	League Two	28	4	1	0	1	0	3	0	33	4
Tranmere Rovers	Total		116	20	3	1	5	0	7	0	132	21
Career total			575	141	40	13	10	2	61	19	686	175

== Honours ==
Wrexham

- FA Trophy runner-up: 2014–15

Tranmere Rovers

- EFL League Two play-offs: 2019
- National League play-offs: 2018

Stockport County

- National League: 2021–22

Individual

- Wrexham Player of the Year: 2015–16
