= James Alabi =

English footballer

Personal information
- Full name: James Bamidele Oluwafemi Alabi
- Date of birth: 8 November 1994 (age 32)
- Place of birth: Southwark, England
- Height: 6 ft 1 in (1.85 m)
- Position: Striker

Team information
- Current team: AFC Rushden & Diamonds (dual-registration from Banbury United)

Youth career
- Tottenham Hotspur
- 2010–2011: Stoke City
- 2011–2012: Celtic
- 2012–2013: Stoke City

Senior career*
Years	Team	Apps	(Gls)
2013–2015	Stoke City	0	(0)
2013	→ Scunthorpe United (loan)	9	(1)
2013	→ Mansfield Town (loan)	1	(0)
2013	→ Forest Green Rovers (loan)	2	(0)
2014	→ Scunthorpe United (loan)	1	(0)
2014	→ Accrington Stanley (loan)	2	(0)
2015–2016	Ipswich Town	0	(0)
2015–2016	→ Grimsby Town (loan)	2	(0)
2016–2017	Chester	58	(23)
2017–2018	Tranmere Rovers	9	(0)
2017–2018	→ Dover Athletic (loan)	11	(1)
2018–2020	Leyton Orient	36	(3)
2020	→ Eastleigh (loan)	7	(1)
2020–2022	Bromley	77	(12)
2022–2023	Maidstone United	26	(2)
2024	Bath City	15	(1)
2024–2025	Eastbourne Borough	4	(0)
2025	Welling United	7	(1)
2025–	Banbury United	18	(2)
2026–	→ AFC Rushden & Diamonds (dual-registration)	0	(0)

International career^{‡}
2017	England C	2	(0)
- * Club domestic league appearances and goals as of 16:15, 13 February 2026 (UTC) ‡ National team caps and goals as of 31 May 2017 (UTC)

James Bamidele Oluwafemi Alabi (born 8 November 1994) is an English footballer who plays as a striker for AFC Rushden & Diamonds on dual-registration from Southern League Premier Division Central club Banbury United.

He has previously played for Stoke City, Scunthorpe United, Mansfield Town, Forest Green Rovers, Accrington Stanley, Ipswich Town, Grimsby Town, Chester, Tranmere Rovers, Dover Athletic, Leyton Orient, Eastleigh, Bromley, Maidstone United, Bath City, Eastbourne Borough and Welling United.

== Career ==
Alabi was born in London Borough of Southwark and began his career at Tottenham Hotspur, before departing the club after not being offered a professional contract. Alabi later joined Stoke City, playing for the club's academy in 2010–11 before moving to Scottish club Celtic. After a season at Lennoxtown he moved back to Stoke City for the 2012–13 season. On 21 February 2013 he joined League One side Scunthorpe United on loan for a month. After seeing him in training Irons manager Brian Laws compared him as a 'technically better' version of John Gayle, who Laws believes was one of his best signings in his first spell at Scunthorpe. He made his professional debut on 23 February against Hartlepool United at Glanford Park, scoring 10 minutes after coming on as a 67th-minute substitute. On 26 March 2013 his loan spell at Scunthorpe was extended until the end of the 2012–13 season. He remained at Glanford Park for the remainder of the season, playing in nine matches as they failed to avoid relegation.

On 31 October 2013, Alabi joined Mansfield Town on a one-month loan. He made his debut for Mansfield the next day against Southend United but was sent-off after for a late tackle. Alabi then joined Forest Green Rovers on a one-month loan on 28 November 2013. He made his debut on 30 November 2013 in an FA Trophy first round tie against Dartford. He played in six games for Forest Green without scoring before returning to Stoke at the end of December 2013. On 11 March 2014, Alabi joined League Two side Scunthorpe United for a second loan spell with the Iron. He made one appearance for Scunthorpe before returning to Stoke. On 9 August 2014, Alabi joined Accrington Stanley on a one-month loan. He played three times for Stanley before returning to Stoke. In January 2015 Alabi had a trial with Dutch side De Graafschap.

He was released by Stoke at the end of the 2014–15 season and joined Ipswich Town, after impressing Mick McCarthy by scoring 2 goals in 2 appearances for the under 21s side on trial, on a one-year deal on 24 August 2015. On 25 August 2015, Alabi made his Ipswich debut, scoring in a 4–1 win against Doncaster Rovers in a League Cup second round match. On 25 November 2015, Alabi joined National League side Grimsby Town, on loan until 3 January 2016.

Following his release by Ipswich, Alabi signed for National League side Chester, on a deal until the end of the 2015–16 season. Alabi joined Tranmere Rovers from Chester on 10 July 2017. He was placed on the transfer list in May 2019, but removed by the club in July 2019.

On 16 January 2020, Alabi signed for Eastleigh, on loan from Leyton Orient until the end of the 2019–20 Season. On 4 September 2020, Alabi signed for Bromley, following his departure from Leyton Orient. On 1 July 2022, Alabi left Bromley following the expiry of his contract. On 9 July 2022, Alabi joined newly promoted National League club Maidstone United. Following the club's relegation, Alabi was released after one season. On 12 January 2024, Bath City confirmed the signing of Alabi until the end of the season.

On 13 December 2024, Alabi joined Eastbourne Borough. In January 2025, he joined Welling United.

In August 2025, he joined Banbury United. In February 2026, he joined AFC Rushden & Diamonds on dual-registration.

== Personal life ==
Born in England, Alabi is of Nigerian descent.

== Career statistics ==
As of 4 January 2025

Appearances and goals by club, season and competition
Club	Season	League			FA Cup		League Cup		Other		Total	
Club	Season	Division	Apps	Goals	Apps	Goals	Apps	Goals	Apps	Goals	Apps	Goals
Stoke City	2012–13	Premier League	0	0	0	0	0	0	0	0	0	0
Stoke City	2013–14	Premier League	0	0	0	0	0	0	0	0	0	0
Stoke City	2014–15	Premier League	0	0	0	0	0	0	0	0	0	0
Stoke City	Total		0	0	0	0	0	0	0	0	0	0
Scunthorpe United (loan)	2012–13	League One	9	1	0	0	0	0	0	0	9	1
Mansfield Town (loan)	2013–14	League Two	1	0	0	0	0	0	0	0	1	0
Forest Green Rovers (loan)	2013–14	Conference Premier	2	0	0	0	—		4 (Note: Appearance(s) in FA Trophy)	0	6	0
Scunthorpe United (loan)	2013–14	League Two	1	0	0	0	0	0	0	0	1	0
Accrington Stanley (loan)	2014–15	League Two	2	0	0	0	1	0	0	0	3	0
Ipswich Town	2015–16	Championship	0	0	0	0	1	1	0	0	1	1
Grimsby Town (loan)	2015–16	National League	2	0	1	0	—		2	2	5	2
Chester	2015–16	National League	16	6	0	0	—		0	0	16	6
Chester	2016–17	National League	42	17	1	0	—		3	1	46	18
Chester	Total		58	23	1	0	—		3	1	62	24
Tranmere Rovers	2017–18	National League	9	0	0	0	—		0	0	9	0
Dover Athletic (loan)	2017–18	National League	11	1	1	0	—		1	0	13	1
Leyton Orient	2018–19	National League	26	2	1	0	—		4	0	31	2
Leyton Orient	2019–20	League Two	10	1	1	0	0	0	3 (Note: Appearances in EFL Trophy)	0	14	1
Leyton Orient	Total		36	3	2	0	—		7	0	45	3
Eastleigh (loan)	2019–20	National League	7	1	0	0	—		0	0	7	1
Bromley	2020–21	National League	37	7	1	0	—		2 (Note: Appearances in National League Play-offs)	1	40	8
Bromley	2021–22	National League	40	4	2	1	—		4	2	46	7
Bromley	Total		77	11	3	1	—		6	3	86	15
Maidstone United	2022–23	National League	26	2	1	0	—		2	0	29	2
Bath City	2023–24	National League South	15	1	—		—		1 (Note: Appearance in National League South play-offs)	0	16	1
Eastbourne Borough	2024–25	National League South	3	0	—		—		0	0	3	0
Career Total			259	43	9	1	2	1	26	6	296	51

== Honours ==
Leyton Orient

- National League: 2018–19

Bromley

- FA Trophy: 2021–22
