= Paul Reid (footballer, born 1982) =

English footballer (born 1982)

Personal information
- Full name: Paul Mark Reid
- Date of birth: 18 February 1982 (age 44)
- Place of birth: Carlisle, England
- Position: Defender

Senior career*
Years	Team	Apps	(Gls)
1999–2000	Carlisle United	19	(0)
2000–2003	Rangers	0	(0)
2002	→ Preston North End (loan)	1	(1)
2002–2003	→ Northampton Town (loan)	19	(0)
2003–2004	Northampton Town	33	(2)
2004–2008	Barnsley	114	(4)
2008	→ Carlisle United (loan)	1	(0)
2008–2011	Colchester United	56	(1)
2011–2013	Scunthorpe United	74	(2)
2013–2014	Northampton Town	16	(0)
2014–2016	Eastleigh	51	(1)
2016–2017	Whitehawk	12	(2)
2017–2017	Eastleigh	10	(0)

International career
1999	England U18	2	(0)
2000	England U19	1	(0)
2001	England U20	2	(0)

Managerial career
- 2016–2017: Whitehawk
- * Club domestic league appearances and goals

Paul Mark Reid (born 18 February 1982) is an English former professional footballer who was previously Head of Youth Development and Academy Director at Sunderland before leaving the role on 30 June 2020.

He started his career with Carlisle United, where his performances in the 1999–2000 season won him a £1,000,000 move to Rangers. He never played a first-team game for Rangers, and instead spent time on loan at Preston North End and Northampton Town, before he was signed by Northampton for a £150,000 fee in June 2003. He was sold on to Barnsley for a fee of £200,000 in July 2004, and captained the club to promotion out of League One via the play-offs in 2006. He was frozen out of the first-team picture in the 2007–08 season, and was loaned out to Carlisle United before he signed with Colchester United in July 2008. In January 2011, he was sold to Scunthorpe United for a fee of around £150,000.

== Club career ==
=== Carlisle United ===
Reid started his career with Martin Wilkinson's Carlisle United, making his debut as a 53rd-minute substitute for Rob Bowman in a 1–0 defeat to Hartlepool United at Victoria Park on 22 January 2000. He started his first game three days later, as the "Cumbrians" beat Wigan Athletic 2–1 in the Football League Trophy at Brunton Park. He kept his first team place for the Third Division clash with Mansfield Town four days later, and went on to finish the 1999–2000 season with 22 appearances to his name. Carlisle narrowly clung onto their Football League status, finishing above last-placed Chester City on goal difference.

=== Rangers ===
Having been courted by Arsenal, Liverpool and Leeds United, he was signed by Dick Advocaat, manager of Scottish Premier League champions Rangers, for an initial £1,000,000 fee in June 2000. After Reid joined Rangers, former Carlisle teammate Shaun Teale stated that he "has got everything in his game to go right to the top and become a huge star. He uses the ball well, is very quick and is a tall lad who is excellent in the air." However, he also voiced concerns that moving to a big club at such a young age could stifle his development. Reid never took to the field in a competitive game at Ibrox, and after Alex McLeish was appointed as boss in December 2001, he was allowed to move out on loan.

His first loan spell was with First Division side Preston North End in January 2002. He made his debut on 5 February, and scored a goal in a 4–2 win over Sheffield Wednesday at Deepdale. However manager David Moyes never picked him again, and he ended the 2001–02 season without any further first team appearances.

=== Northampton Town ===
In January 2003, Reid joined Northampton Town on loan until the end of the 2002–03 season. He played 19 games as the "Cobblers" were relegated out of the Second Division with a last-place finish. He impressed manager Martin Wilkinson, who took him to Sixfields on a permanent basis for a £150,000 fee in June 2003.

In August 2003 he was appointed as club captain on the field, whilst Paul Trollope served as captain in off the field matters. New boss Colin Calderwood led Northampton to the Third Division play-offs in 2003–04. Northampton drew 3–3 with Mansfield Town in the play-off semi-finals; Reid scored his penalty in the subsequent shoot-out at Field Mill, but a miss from Eric Sabin allowed Mansfield to advance with a 5–4 win.

=== Barnsley ===
In July 2004, Reid joined Paul Hart's Barnsley on a two-year contract for a fee of around £200,000. He scored on his debut on 7 August, scoring Barnsley's first goal of the season-opening 1–1 draw with Milton Keynes Dons at the National Hockey Stadium. He played 44 games in the 2004–05 season, helping the club to a 13th-place finish in League One.

New manager Andy Ritchie appointed Reid as club captain in August 2005. He missed five weeks of the start of the 2005–06 campaign after picking up a hamstring injury, this injury coupled with his disciplinary record of seven yellow cards and two red cards limited him to 33 league games throughout the campaign. He managed to take part in the play-offs however, and his headed goal against Huddersfield Town in the second leg of the semi-finals at the Galpharm Stadium helped to take the "Tykes" into the 2006 play-off final. He played all 120 minutes of the final at the Millennium Stadium, helping Barnsley to secure promotion with a penalty shoot-out victory over Swansea City following a 2–2 draw.

He signed a new two-year contract in June 2006. He played 37 Championship matches in the 2006–07 season, and remained a key member of the defense as new boss Simon Davey led the club to eight points above the relegation zone.

Reid signed a new two-year contract in May 2007. On 18 August, he was sent off for an alleged elbow on Colchester United striker Teddy Sheringham. This was his last appearance for the club, aside from a few more minutes as a late substitute a month later. Davey confirmed Reid's time at Oakwell had come to an end when he placed Reid on the transfer-list in January 2008, alongside Nick Colgan and Andy Johnson.

Reid returned to League One with former club Carlisle United on loan on 27 March 2008 until the end of the season as the "Blues" looked for cover in the last eight games of their push for promotion to the Championship. He played just 45 minutes in his loan spell. He was released by Barnsley in June 2008, after having his contract terminated by mutual consent.

=== Colchester United ===
In July 2008, he signed a contract with League One club Colchester United. He formed a strong partnership with Pat Baldwin in the 2008–09 season. He was threatened with legal action by manager Jim Gannon in October after a challenge on Matty McNeil left McNeil with concussion; Gannon said that "We are collecting all the evidence and presenting it to the police. It's up to them to take criminal proceedings against the player in question." In the latter half of the campaign, he faced competition for his first team place at the Colchester Community Stadium from fellow defenders Pat Baldwin, Chris Coyne and Matt Heath.

Paul Lambert was replaced as manager by Aidy Boothroyd at the start of the 2009–10 season, who preferred to play a near ever-present Magnus Okuonghae alongside one of Reid, Heath and Danny Batth. Reid played just 14 games throughout the campaign.

He was returned to the starting line-up by new manager John Ward in the 2010–11 season, making 21 appearances before he was sold midway through the season.

=== Scunthorpe United ===
In January 2011, Reid joined Scunthorpe United for an undisclosed fee, believed to be in the region of £150,000; he signed a two-and-a-half-year deal. He played 12 games for the "Iron" in what remained of the 2010–11 campaign, as Scunthorpe dropped into League One out of the Championship.

He played 38 games in the 2011–12 season, as Alan Knill's side finished in the lower half of the table after a disappointing campaign.

Reid lost his first team place at Glanford Park to David Mirfin in the 2012–13 season. He made 27 appearances in the 2012–13 campaign, as United were relegated into League Two. Reid was one of seven senior players not to be offered new contracts in the summer.

He had a trial at League One side Port Vale in July 2013.

=== Return to Northampton Town ===
On 27 September 2013, Reid returned to former club Northampton Town on a contract until late January 2014.

=== Eastleigh ===
On 17 June 2014, Reid signed for newly promoted to the Conference Premier side Eastleigh on a 2-year contract after being released from Northampton Town.

=== Whitehawk ===
On 16 September 2016, Reid signed for Brighton-based National League South side Whitehawk, to play under his former boss at Eastleigh, Richard Hill. After Hill left the club to join Aston Villa as a scout in November 2016, Reid was appointed as joint interim manager, while continuing as a player. This appointment was confirmed until the end of the season on 22 December but with the Hawks in the bottom three at the end of January, the club advertised for a new permanent manager, retaining Reid as a player. On 9 March 2017 Whitehawk announced that Reid had left the club by mutual consent. He played his last match for Whitehawk in a 1–0 victory against Welling United on 4 March 2017.

== International career ==
In 2000 Reid represented his country at Under 18 and England under-19 team and was capped against the Netherlands. He was named in the England under-20 squad in March 2002.

== Career statistics ==
As of match played 30 December 2017

Appearances and goals by club, season and competition
Club	Season	League			National cup		League cup		Other		Total	
Club	Season	Division	Apps	Goals	Apps	Goals	Apps	Goals	Apps	Goals	Apps	Goals
Carlisle United	1999–2000	Third Division	19	0	0	0	0	0	3 (Note: Appearances in the Football League Trophy)	0	22	0
Rangers	2000–01	Scottish Premier League	0	0	0	0	0	0	0	0	0	0
Rangers	2001–02	Scottish Premier League	0	0	0	0	0	0	0	0	0	0
Rangers	2002–03	Scottish Premier League	0	0	0	0	0	0	0	0	0	0
Rangers	Total		0	0	0	0	0	0	0	0	0	0
Preston North End (loan)	2001–02	First Division	1	1	0	0	0	0	0	0	1	1
Northampton Town (loan)	2002–03	Second Division	19	0	0	0	0	0	0	0	19	0
Northampton Town	2003–04	Third Division	33	2	3	0	2	0	4 (Note: Two appearances in the Football League Trophy; two appearances in the Third Division play-offs)	0	42	2
Northampton Town	Total		52	2	3	0	2	0	4	0	61	2
Barnsley	2004–05	League One	41	3	1	0	1	1	1	0	44	4
Barnsley	2005–06	League One	33	0	3	1	1	0	3 (Note: Appearances in the League One play-offs)	1	40	2
Barnsley	2006–07	Championship	37	0	2	0	1	0	0	0	40	0
Barnsley	2007–08	Championship	3	0	0	0	1	1	0	0	4	1
Barnsley	Total		114	3	6	1	4	2	4	1	128	7
Carlisle United (loan)	2007–08	League One	1	0	0	0	0	0	0	0	1	0
Colchester United	2008–09	League One	26	1	0	0	2	0	1	0	29	1
Colchester United	2009–10	League One	12	0	2	0	0	0	0	0	14	0
Colchester United	2010–11	League One	18	0	3	0	1	0	0	0	22	0
Colchester United	Total		56	1	5	0	3	0	1	0	65	1
Scunthorpe United	2010–11	Championship	12	0	0	0	0	0	0	0	12	0
Scunthorpe United	2011–12	League One	36	1	0	0	1	0	1	0	38	1
Scunthorpe United	2012–13	League One	26	1	1	0	0	0	0	0	27	1
Scunthorpe United	Total		74	2	1	0	1	0	1	0	77	2
Northampton Town	2013–14	League Two	16	0	2	0	0	0	0	0	18	0
Eastleigh	2014–15	Conference Premier	29	1	3	0	—		0	0	32	1
Eastleigh	2015–16	Conference Premier	22	0	3	0	—		1 (Note: Appearances in the FA Trophy)	0	26	0
Eastleigh	Total		51	1	6	0	0	0	1	0	58	1
Whitehawk	2016–17	National League South	12	2	3	0	—		2	0	17	2
Eastleigh	2016–17	National League	10	0	0	0	—		0	0	10	0
Eastleigh	2017–18	National League	0	0	0	0	—		0	0	0	0
Eastleigh	Total		10	0	0	0	0	0	0	0	10	0
Career total			406	12	26	1	10	2	16	1	458	16

== Honours ==
Barnsley

- Football League One play-offs: 2006
