= Bobby Grant (footballer, born 1990) =

English association football player

Personal information
- Full name: Robert Grant
- Date of birth: 1 July 1990 (age 36)
- Place of birth: Liverpool, England
- Height: 5 ft 11 in (1.80 m)
- Positions: Attacking midfielder; striker

Team information
- Current team: Marine (manager)

Youth career
- –2006: Accrington Stanley

Senior career*
Years	Team	Apps	(Gls)
2006–2010	Accrington Stanley	65	(15)
2010–2012	Scunthorpe United	59	(7)
2010–2011	→ Rochdale (loan)	6	(2)
2012	→ Accrington Stanley (loan)	8	(3)
2012–2013	Rochdale	36	(15)
2013–2015	Blackpool	6	(0)
2014	→ Fleetwood Town (loan)	1	(0)
2014–2015	→ Shrewsbury Town (loan)	32	(6)
2015–2019	Fleetwood Town	119	(22)
2018	→ Wrexham (loan)	6	(1)
2019–2021	Wrexham	43	(9)
2020	→ Accrington Stanley (loan)	5	(1)
2020–2021	→ Oldham Athletic (loan)	18	(3)
2021–2023	Radcliffe	54	(18)
2023	Litherland REMYCA	4	(3)
2023	F.C. United of Manchester	0	(0)
2023–2024	Litherland REMYCA	5	(6)
2024–2025	Marine	34	(13)

Managerial career
- 2021–2023: Radcliffe
- 2025–: Marine
- * Club domestic league appearances and goals as of 11:45, 28 April 2025 (UTC)

Robert Grant (born 1 July 1990) is an English football manager and former footballer who manages National League North side Marine.

== Playing career ==
=== Accrington Stanley ===
Born in Liverpool, Merseyside, Grant came through Accrington Stanley's youth system and made his first team debut on 5 May 2007 in the League Two clash with Milton Keynes Dons at the National Hockey Stadium which ended in 3–1 defeat for Stanley. In that game, at the age of 16 years 309 days, he became the second youngest player to appear in The Football League for Stanley and the youngest since February 1959. At the beginning of the 2007–08 season he suffered a knee injury which kept him out until January 2008, soon after he signed professional terms. His first goal for Stanley came in a 1–0 home win against Chesterfield on 25 April 2009.

=== Scunthorpe United ===
On 24 June 2010 Grant signed for Scunthorpe United for the fee up to £260,000 and signed a two-year deal at the club. He was awarded a one-year contract extension by the club in May 2012.

=== Rochdale ===
In the summer of 2012 Grant signed a two-year deal at Rochdale for an undisclosed fee and rejoined John Coleman who was his manager while he was at Accrington Stanley. On 17 June 2013 Grant had a transfer request accepted by Rochdale after a successful season at Spotland in which he scored 16 goals from 28 appearances.

=== Blackpool ===
On 18 July 2013, Grant signed for Blackpool for an undisclosed fee, on a two-year contract with an option of a further year. He was released in May 2015.

==== Fleetwood Town (loan) ====
On 28 February 2014, Grant joined League Two side Fleetwood Town for the remainder of the 2013–14 season but was injured 38 minutes into his debut.

==== Shrewsbury Town (loan) ====
Having not featured for his parent club since December 2013, Grant signed on an initial one-month loan with Shrewsbury Town in League Two on 9 October 2014, linking up with former Blackpool teammates James Caton and Mark Halstead. He made his debut a week later, playing an hour as Shrewsbury picked up their first away win of the season against York City. His loan was later extended until the New Year, and he scored his first goal for the club in a 2–0 home win over Mansfield Town on 15 November. Grant made a brief return Blackpool in January 2015, before extending his loan period at Shrewsbury to the end of the 2014–15 season.

After scoring a brace in two matches – in a 2–1 away win at his former club Accrington, and also in Shrewsbury's first ever win at Fratton Park against Portsmouth, as well as a further goal against Cambridge United, Grant won the Football League Two Player of the Month award for March 2015.

Having featured regularly as the club were promoted back to League One at the first attempt, Grant subsequently returned to Blackpool at the end of the season, although he expressed his interest in a permanent transfer to Shrewsbury should the opportunity arise.

=== Return to Fleetwood Town ===
After being released by Blackpool, Grant rejoined Fleetwood Town on a two-year deal in July 2015. He signed a two-year contract extension in March 2017.

=== Wrexham ===
On 24 November 2018, Grant joined Wrexham on a short-term loan until January 2019. Bobby Grant made his short-term loan permanent on 2 January 2019.

=== Return to Accrington Stanley (loan) ===
Grant stepped up two divisions on 31 January 2020 to re-join Accrington Stanley on a six-month loan.

=== Loan to Oldham Athletic ===
On 10 August 2020, it was announced that Grant had joined Oldham Athletic on a season-long loan. He scored on his debut for Oldham in a 3–0 EFL Cup win over Carlisle United on 5 September 2020.

=== Radcliffe ===
On 27 June 2021, Grant took a player-coach role at Radcliffe following his release from Wrexham.

On 7 October 2021, Radcliffe announced that Grant would be taking over first-team managerial duties until further notice, following the sacking of Lee Fowler.

On 29 April 2023, he was announced to have departed the club by mutual consent. He had led the club to their highest league finish, defeat on the final day of the 2022–23 season denying the club a play-off place however.

=== Litherland REMYCA ===
On 14 October 2023, Grant signed for Litherland REMYCA.

=== FC United of Manchester ===
On 17 November 2023, it was announced that Grant had signed for FC United of Manchester. However he contacted the club later in the evening saying he had received a more attractive offer from another club.

=== Return to Litherland REMYCA ===
On 18 November 2023, Grant re-signed for Litherland REMYCA.

=== Marine ===
In January 2024, Grant joined Marine. He became captain of the side for the 2024/25 season. In April 2025, he announced that he would retire from football at the end of the season.

== Managerial career ==
=== Marine ===
In May 2025, Grant was appointed as manager of Marine.

== Style of play ==
Grant is able to play as a striker, but has often been utilised as an attacking midfielder or winger. He is left footed, and known for his ability to shoot accurately from distance.

== Career statistics ==
As of match played 23 April 2022

Appearances and goals by club, season and competition
Club	Season	League			FA Cup		League Cup		Other		Total	
Club	Season	Division	Apps	Goals	Apps	Goals	Apps	Goals	Apps	Goals	Apps	Goals
Accrington Stanley	2006–07	League Two	1	0	0	0	0	0	0	0	1	0
Accrington Stanley	2007–08	League Two	7	0	0	0	0	0	0	0	7	0
Accrington Stanley	2008–09	League Two	15	1	0	0	1	0	0	0	16	1
Accrington Stanley	2009–10	League Two	42	14	5	2	2	1	4	1	53	18
Accrington Stanley	Total		65	15	5	2	3	1	4	1	77	19
Scunthorpe United	2010–11	Championship	27	0	0	0	3	0	0	0	30	0
Scunthorpe United	2011–12	League One	29	7	2	0	2	0	2	2	35	9
Scunthorpe United	2012–13	League One	3	0	0	0	2	2	0	0	5	2
Scunthorpe United	Total		59	7	2	0	7	2	2	2	70	11
Rochdale (loan)	2010–11	League One	6	2	0	0	0	0	0	0	6	2
Accrington Stanley (loan)	2011–12	League Two	8	3	0	0	0	0	0	0	8	3
Rochdale	2012–13	League Two	36	15	1	0	0	0	1	1	38	16
Blackpool	2013–14	Championship	6	0	0	0	1	0	0	0	7	0
Blackpool	2014–15	Championship	0	0	0	0	0	0	0	0	0	0
Blackpool	Total		6	0	0	0	1	0	0	0	7	0
Fleetwood Town (loan)	2013–14	League Two	1	0	0	0	0	0	0	0	1	0
Shrewsbury Town (loan)	2014–15	League Two	33	6	3	0	1	0	0	0	37	6
Fleetwood Town	2015–16	League One	38	10	0	0	1	0	5	1	44	11
Fleetwood Town	2016–17	League One	48	9	5	0	1	0	2	0	56	9
Fleetwood Town	2017–18	League One	29	3	1	0	0	0	3	1	33	4
Fleetwood Town	2018–19	League One	4	0	0	0	1	0	1	0	6	0
Fleetwood Town	Total		119	22	6	0	3	0	11	2	139	24
Wrexham	2018–19	National League	16	2	2	0	0	0	1	0	19	2
Wrexham	2019–20	National League	27	7	2	0	0	0	0	0	29	7
Wrexham	Total		43	9	4	0	0	0	1	0	48	9
Accrington Stanley (loan)	2019–20	League One	5	1	0	0	0	0	0	0	5	1
Oldham Athletic (loan)	2020–21	League Two	23	3	1	1	2	1	3	2	29	7
Radcliffe	2021–22	Northern Premier League; Premier Division	38	16	3	0	0	0	3 (Note: 3 Appearances in FA Trophy)	3	44	19
Career totals			442	99	22	3	17	4	18	11	512	117

== Managerial statistics ==
As of match played 23 April 2022

Managerial record by team and tenure
Team	From	To	Record				
Team	From	To	P	W	D	L	Win %
Radcliffe (interim)	7 October 2021	29 April 2023	35	16	3	16	45.7

== Honours ==
Shrewsbury Town

- Football League Two runner-up: 2014–15

Individual

- Football League Two Player of the Month: March 2015
