= Mark Duffy (footballer) =

English footballer (born 1985)

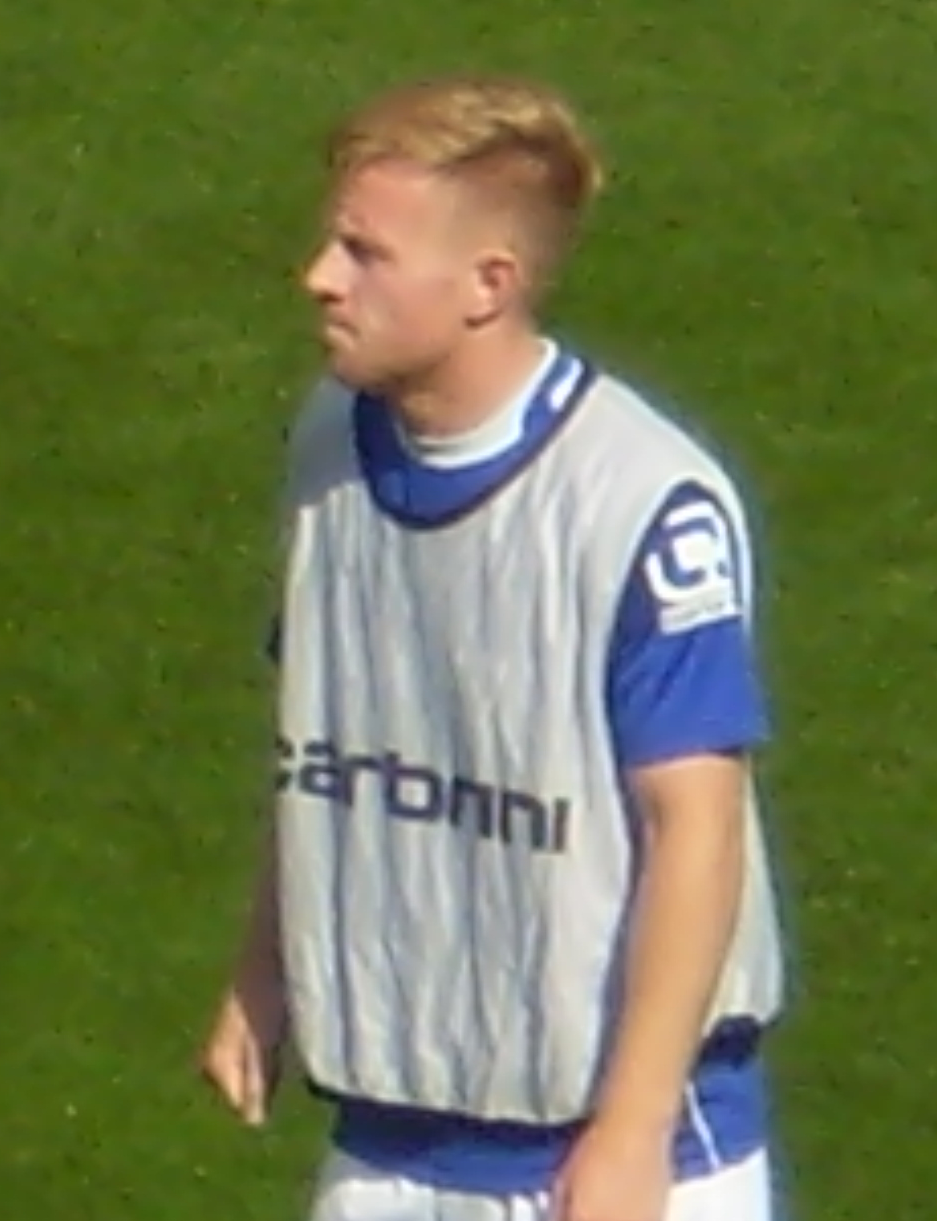
- Duffy with Birmingham City in 2014

Personal information
- Full name: Mark James Duffy
- Date of birth: 7 October 1985 (age 41)
- Place of birth: Liverpool, England
- Height: 5 ft 9 in (1.75 m)
- Positions: Attacking midfielder; right winger

Youth career
- 1993–2003: Liverpool
- 2003–2004: Wrexham

Senior career*
Years	Team	Apps	(Gls)
2004–2005	Vauxhall Motors	6	(0)
2005–2007	Prescot Cables		
2007–2009	Southport	79	(13)
2009	→ Morecambe (loan)	9	(1)
2009–2011	Morecambe	59	(5)
2011–2013	Scunthorpe United	102	(8)
2013–2014	Doncaster Rovers	36	(2)
2014–2016	Birmingham City	4	(0)
2015	→ Chesterfield (loan)	3	(0)
2015–2016	→ Burton Albion (loan)	45	(8)
2016–2020	Sheffield United	111	(15)
2019–2020	→ Stoke City (loan)	6	(0)
2020	→ ADO Den Haag (loan)	5	(0)
2020–2021	Fleetwood Town	24	(0)
2021–2022	Tranmere Rovers	3	(0)
2022–2023	Macclesfield	36	(2)
2024	Warrington Rylands	8	(0)
Total		536	(54)

Managerial career
- 2023: Macclesfield
- 2024: Warrington Rylands
- 2026: Southport (caretaker)
- 2026: Southport
- * Club domestic league appearances and goals

Mark James Duffy (born 7 October 1985) is an English football coach and former player who was most recently manager of National League North club Southport.

An attacking midfielder and right winger, Duffy began his career with the academies at Liverpool and Wrexham before joining non-league side Vauxhall Motors. From there he went to Prescot Cables and Southport and entered the Football League with Morecambe. He joined Scunthorpe United in January 2011, where he spent two and a half years at Glanford Park and the 2013–14 season at Doncaster Rovers.

Duffy moved to Birmingham City in June 2014 but failed to establish himself in the side and was loaned out to Chesterfield and Burton Albion with whom he helped win promotion to the Championship. Duffy signed for Sheffield United in June 2016 and under the management of Chris Wilder the Blades won promotion from League One in 2016–17 and the Championship in 2018–19. In August 2019 Duffy joined Stoke City on loan for the first half of the 2019–20 season and then Dutch side ADO Den Haag in January 2020.

== Career ==
=== Early life and career ===
Born in Liverpool, Duffy played for the youth teams of both home-town club Liverpool (from the age of 7 to 16) and Welsh club Wrexham. Duffy began his senior career playing non-League football for Vauxhall Motors, where he made nine appearances (six in the league), scoring once against Woodley Sports in the Cheshire Senior Cup. He later joined Prescot Cables. Duffy stated that, early in his career, he lost his love of football and began working as a scaffolder and as a sports coach for the council. Duffy moved to Conference National side Southport from Prescot Cables in February 2007. The Sandgrounders were relegated to the Conference North at the end of the 2006–07 season. Duffy remained at Haig Avenue for the 2007–08 season and mid-way through 2008–09 he was in talks to join Football League side Morecambe.

=== Morecambe ===
Duffy signed for League Two club Morecambe on loan in February 2009. He scored his first goal Football League goal on 18 April 2009 in a 1–0 win against Notts County. He made the move to Globe Arena permanent in the summer and scored six goals in 41 games as the Shrimps reached the League Two play-offs where they lost 7–2 on aggregate to Dagenham & Redbridge. Duffy began the 2010–11 season in good form and manager Sammy McIlroy stated that he can go on to play at a higher level.

=== Scunthorpe United ===
Duffy moved to Championship side Scunthorpe United on 20 January 2011 for an undisclosed fee, signing a two-and-a-half-year contract. He made his debut two days later, in a 0–0 draw at home to Burnley. Duffy played 22 times for Scunthorpe in 2010–11 as the Iron suffered relegation to League One. He made 43 appearances in 2011–12 helping Scunthorpe avoid a second consecutive relegation. However relegation to League Two was suffered in 2012–13 despite a final day victory against Swindon Town. Following relegation Scunthorpe received several bids for Duffy from Doncaster Rovers.

=== Doncaster Rovers ===
Duffy moved to Doncaster Rovers in July 2013 for an undisclosed fee. Duffy scored twice in 39 appearances in 2013–14 as Doncaster were relegated to League One on goal difference.

=== Birmingham City ===
Duffy signed a two-year contract with Birmingham City in June 2014 after activating his relegation release clause at Doncaster Rovers. He made his debut as a second-half substitute in the opening-day defeat at Middlesbrough, and his first League start for the club on 27 September, in a 2–1 home defeat to Fulham; Duffy was substituted at half-time, at which point Birmingham were leading. After appearing only once more in the league by the end of January 2015, he spent a month on loan to League One club Chesterfield, where he made one start and two substitute appearances.

==== Loan to Burton Albion ====
Before the start of the 2015–16 season, Duffy joined Burton Albion, newly promoted to League One, on loan until 2 January 2016. In pre-season, Burton manager Jimmy-Floyd Hasselbaink used him in a playmaker role, and he began the league season as a regular selection in the starting eleven. In the opening match, Scunthorpe goalkeeper Luke Daniels was sent off for elbowing Duffy in the head; the resulting penalty gave Burton a 2–1 win.

After the initial loan period expired, it was extended to the end of the season. Duffy completed the season having missed only one league match, against Walsall in February after twisting his ankle in training. He scored eight goals and provided numerous assists as Burton were promoted to the Championship as League One runners-up. His performances earned him selection in the PFA League One Team of the Year.

=== Sheffield United ===
Duffy was released by Birmingham at the end of the season, and signed a two-year contract with League One club Sheffield United. Duffy won promotion from League One for a second successive year in 2017, and was also named in the PFA Team of the Year for a second time. Duffy was converted to an attacking midfield role under the management of Chris Wilder as the Blades had a solid return to the Championship finishing in 10th place. He signed a new contract with Sheffield United in January 2018. Duffy scored six goals in 38 matches in 2018–19 as Sheffield United had a very successful campaign finishing as runners-up and were promoted to the Premier League. However, in pre-season Duffy's request for a new contract was turned down by Wilder who made him available for a move away from Bramall Lane.

==== Loan to Stoke City ====
On 8 August 2019, Duffy joined Stoke City on loan for the 2019–20 season. Duffy struggled for game time at Stoke making just nine appearances under Nathan Jones and didn't feature at all under Michael O'Neill.

==== Loan at ADO Den Haag ====
On 31 January 2020 Duffy's loan at Stoke was cut short and he moved on a six-month loan to Dutch side ADO Den Haag.

He was released by Sheffield United at the end of the 2019–20 season.

=== Fleetwood Town ===
On 4 September 2020 he signed a one-year contract with Fleetwood Town. He scored his first goal for Fleetwood in an EFL Cup tie against Everton on 23 September 2020.

At the end of the 2020–21 season, he was released by Fleetwood Town.

=== Tranmere Rovers ===
On 31 August 2021, Duffy joined League Two club Tranmere Rovers on a short-term deal until January 2022.

=== Macclesfield ===
On 7 January 2022, Duffy signed for North West Counties League Premier Division side Macclesfield. During his time at the club, he helped them achieve back-to-back league titles and promotions as they went from the ninth to the seventh tier, as well as acting as first-team coach. After the departure of Neil Danns on 5 May 2023, Duffy was named as the head coach of Macclesfield. He was sacked in October 2023 following a run of four defeats in five matches.

=== Warrington Rylands ===
In February 2024, Duffy returned to playing when he joined Warrington Rylands. He made nine appearances, mainly as a substitute, and, after Rylands' manager was sacked in mid-April, took charge of the team alongside Dean Furman took charge of the team for the last three matches of the season, which included a play-off semifinal defeat. On 24 May, Duffy was appointed manager of Warrington Rylands.

Following a poor start to the season, he was sacked in September 2024.

== Coaching career ==
=== Southport ===
In May 2025, Duffy was appointed assistant manager of former side Southport, assisting the newly appointed Neil Danns.

In September 2026, Duffy became caretaker manager following the departure of Danns. On 1 October, he was appointed as permanent manager. The tenure only lasted 20 days however as he left the club by mutual consent on 20 October 2026.

== Career statistics ==
As of match played 15 April 2023

Appearances and goals by club, season and competition
Club	Season	League			National cup		League cup		Other		Total	
Club	Season	Division	Apps	Goals	Apps	Goals	Apps	Goals	Apps	Goals	Apps	Goals
Vauxhall Motors	2004–05	Conference North	6	0	0	0	—		3 (Note: Two appearances and one goal in Cheshire Senior Cup, one appearance in Conference League Cup)	1	9	1
Southport	2006–07	Conference National	17	4	0	0	—		—		17	4
Southport	2007–08	Conference North	38	5	3	1	—		9 (Note: Two appearances in FA Trophy, two appearances and two goals in Conference League Cup, two appearances in Conference North play-offs, two appearances and one goal in Lancashire Junior Cup, one appearance in Liverpool Senior Cup)	3	50	9
Southport	2008–09	Conference North	24	4	1	0	—		10 (Note: Six appearances and two goals in FA Trophy, three appearances in Conference League Cup, one appearance in Lancashire Junior Cup)	2	35	6
Southport	Total		79	13	4	1	—		19	5	102	19
Morecambe (loan)	2008–09	League Two	9	1	0	0	0	0	—		9	1
Morecambe	2009–10	League Two	37	5	2	1	1	0	1 (Note: Appearance(s) in Football League Trophy)	0	41	6
Morecambe	2010–11	League Two	22	0	1	0	2	0	1	0	26	0
Morecambe	Total		68	6	3	1	3	0	2	0	76	7
Scunthorpe United	2010–11	Championship	22	1	0	0	0	0	—		22	1
Scunthorpe United	2011–12	League One	37	2	2	0	2	0	2	0	43	2
Scunthorpe United	2012–13	League One	43	5	1	0	2	1	1	1	47	7
Scunthorpe United	Total		102	8	3	0	4	1	3	1	112	10
Doncaster Rovers	2013–14	Championship	36	2	1	0	2	0	—		39	2
Birmingham City	2014–15	Championship	4	0	1	0	2	1	—		7	1
Birmingham City	2015–16	Championship	0	0	0	0	0	0	—		0	0
Birmingham City	Total		4	0	1	0	2	1	—		7	1
Chesterfield (loan)	2014–15	League One	3	0	0	0	0	0	—		3	0
Burton Albion (loan)	2015–16	League One	45	8	1	0	0	0	1	0	47	8
Sheffield United	2016–17	League One	39	6	2	0	1	0	2 (Note: Appearance(s) in EFL Trophy)	0	44	6
Sheffield United	2017–18	Championship	36	3	2	0	1	0	—		39	3
Sheffield United	2018–19	Championship	36	6	1	0	1	0	—		38	6
Sheffield United	2019–20	Premier League	0	0	0	0	0	0	—		0	0
Sheffield United	Total		111	15	5	0	3	0	2	0	121	15
Stoke City (loan)	2019–20	Championship	6	0	0	0	3	0	—		9	0
ADO Den Haag (loan)	2019–20	Eredivisie	5	0	—		—		—		5	0
Fleetwood Town	2020–21	League One	24	0	0	0	3	1	4	1	31	2
Tranmere Rovers	2021–22	League Two	3	0	0	0	0	0	4	0	7	0
Macclesfield	2021–22	NWCL Premier Division	14	1	—		—		2 (Note: Appearances in NWCFL Challenge Cup)	0	16	1
Macclesfield	2022–23	NPL Division One West	21	1	2	0	—		4 (Note: Three appearances in FA Trophy, one in Cheshire Senior Cup)	0	27	1
Macclesfield	2023–24	NPL Premier Division	1	0	1	0	—		0	0	2	0
Macclesfield	Total		36	2	3	0	—		6	0	45	2
Warrington Rylands	2023–24	NPL Premier Division	8	0	—		—		1 (Note: Appearance in Northern Premier League Premier Division play-offs)	0	9	0
Career total			536	54	21	2	20	3	45	8	622	67

== Honours ==
Southport

- Lancashire Junior Cup: 2007–08

Burton Albion

- Football League One runner-up: 2015–16

Sheffield United

- EFL League One: 2016–17
- EFL Championship runner-up: 2018–19

Macclesfield

- North West Counties Football League Premier Division: 2021–22
- Northern Premier League Division One West: 2022–23

Individual

- PFA Team of the Year: 2015–16 League One, 2016–17 League One
