= Michael O'Connor (footballer, born 1987) =

Northern Irish footballer (born 1987)

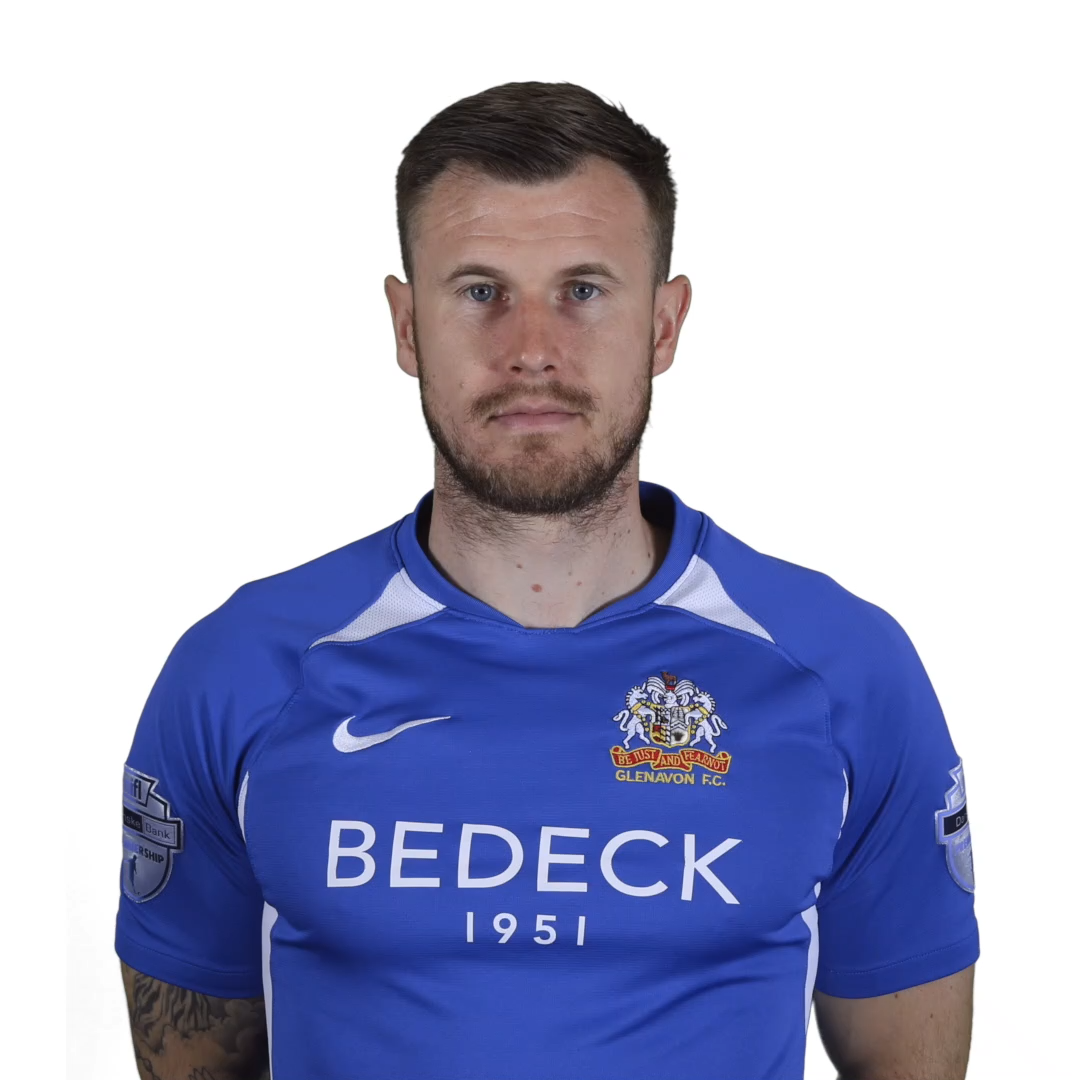
- O'Connor in a Glenavon kit in 2020

Personal information
- Full name: Michael Joseph O'Connor
- Date of birth: 6 October 1987 (age 39)
- Place of birth: Belfast, Northern Ireland
- Height: 6 ft 1 in (1.85 m)
- Position: Midfielder

Team information
- Current team: Glenavon (manager)

Youth career
- 2004–2005: Crewe Alexandra

Senior career*
Years	Team	Apps	(Gls)
2005–2009	Crewe Alexandra	77	(3)
2009	→ Lincoln City (loan)	10	(1)
2009–2012	Scunthorpe United	97	(12)
2012–2014	Rotherham United	65	(7)
2014–2016	Port Vale	70	(10)
2016–2018	Notts County	38	(2)
2018–2020	Lincoln City	56	(3)
2020	Salford City	8	(1)
2020–2023	Glenavon	70	(11)
2023	Newry City	0	(0)
Total		491	(38)

International career
	Northern Ireland U15	7	(0)
	Northern Ireland U17	13	(6)
	Northern Ireland U18	1	(0)
	Northern Ireland U19	10	(0)
2007–2008	Northern Ireland U21	3	(2)
2008–2013	Northern Ireland	11	(0)
2009	Northern Ireland B	1	(0)

Managerial career
- 2025–: Glenavon
- * Club domestic league appearances and goals

Michael Joseph O'Connor (born 6 October 1987) is a football manager and former professional player who is the manager of NIFL Premiership club Glenavon.

O'Connor began his professional career at Crewe Alexandra in 2005 and soon established himself as a first-team regular. He was loaned out to Lincoln City in March 2009 and was sold to Scunthorpe United in July 2009 for a £250,000 fee. He spent three seasons with the "Iron", two of which were in the Championship, before he was allowed to sign with Rotherham United in May 2012. He helped the "Millers" to win two consecutive promotions, coming out of League Two as runners-up in 2012–13, and then winning the League One play-off final in 2014. He signed with Port Vale in July 2014 and went on to be named the club's Player of the Year in 2014–15. He signed with Notts County in June 2016 and stayed with the club for two years before joining Lincoln City in July 2018. He helped Lincoln to win the League Two title at the end of the 2018–19 season before he joined Salford City in January 2020. He returned to Northern Ireland to sign with Glenavon in August 2020. He joined Newry City as assistant manager in May 2023.

He was one of several Northern Irish footballers involved in a dispute between the IFA and the FAI concerning international eligibility. Having initially represented Northern Ireland up to under-21 level, O'Connor was persuaded to switch to the Republic of Ireland's under-21 squad for a brief period. However, he subsequently decided to revert permanently to the Northern Ireland national team, to whom he became irrevocably committed.

He was appointed manager of Glenavon in October 2025.

== Club career ==
=== Crewe Alexandra ===
O'Connor was spotted by Crewe Alexandra scouts as a young teenager playing youth team football in Northern Ireland. In 2004, shortly after he turned 16, he signed scholarship terms. He was a prominent member of the Alexandra youth team that reached the semi-final of the 2004 FA Youth Cup, and he later captained the side. In July 2005 he signed a three-year professional contract. On 25 February 2006, aged 18, he made his Championship debut at Gresty Road when he came on as a late substitute for Gareth Taylor in a 2–1 win over Brighton & Hove Albion. He made his second senior appearance for the "Railwaymen" in the club's final game of the 2005–06 season against Millwall on 30 April 2006, replacing Lee Bell at half-time he went on to set up two goals and hit the post with his one shot. He began the 2006–07 season as a regular first-team player for Crewe, now in League One, under manager Dario Gradi. He scored his first senior goal on 22 August, in the League Cup, with a "fierce shot" from 18 yards (16 m) in a 3–0 victory over Grimsby Town. In all he made 34 appearances during the campaign.

O'Connor was not a regular first-team player under new boss Steve Holland in the first half of the 2007–08 campaign, but won back his first-team spot in the second half of the season. He was named in the League One 'Team of the Week' in March 2008 for his performance in a 3–0 win over Gillingham. After scoring his first league goal for the club on 13 September 2008 in a 2–0 victory over Colchester United, he went on to score in the next two games against Southend United and then against Liverpool in a 2–1 League Cup defeat at Anfield. However, he fell out of favour at Crewe under manager Guðjón Þórðarson after committing "breaches of discipline". O'Connor joined Peter Jackson's League Two side Lincoln City on a one-month emergency loan on 6 March 2009, a day before a Lincolnshire derby against Grimsby, as a short-term replacement for Lee Frecklington. O'Connor returned from Sincil Bank on 18 April after he was suspended for picking up 10 yellow cards that season, and subsequently trained with Scottish Premier League club Hibernian.

=== Scunthorpe United ===
In July 2009, Crewe accepted an undisclosed offer (later revealed to be £250,000) for O'Connor from Scunthorpe United, and he signed a three-year contract with the club. He went on to make 36 appearances for Scunthorpe in the 2009–10 campaign, helping Nigel Adkins's "Iron" to finish above the Championship relegation zone.

Scunthorpe struggled in the 2010–11 season following Atkins's departure, and Ian Baraclough and then Alan Knill failed to keep the club outside the relegation places. This was despite O'Connor significantly improving his goal tally, hitting nine goals in his 36 appearances. Premier League clubs West Ham United and Newcastle United were linked with O'Connor during the January transfer window, but Baraclough confirmed that no formal approaches were made. In the summer the club rejected an undisclosed bid from Peterborough United. He played 36 games at Glanford Park in the 2011–12 season as Scunthorpe laboured to a mid-table finish in League One. He was subject to an offer by Hibernian in January 2012 but remained in England. On 3 March, he was sent off after retaliating to a foul by Craig Eastmond in a 4–1 victory over Wycombe Wanderers at Glanford Park. He was released by the club in May 2012.

=== Rotherham United ===
O'Connor signed a two-year contract with Rotherham United in May 2012. He made his "Millers" debut on 18 August 2012, in a 3–0 win over Burton Albion at the New York Stadium. He scored his first goal for the club in a 4–0 win over Bradford City on 1 September. He scored again the following week in a 6–2 defeat to Port Vale. On 29 September, he scored twice in a 3–1 win against Oxford United. On 9 February, he was sent off for a stamp on Jacques Maghoma in a 2–0 defeat at Burton Albion. On 15 December, he was named in the League Two team of the week for his performance in a 1–0 win at AFC Wimbledon. In all he scored six goal in 40 appearances as he helped Steve Evans's side win promotion out of League Two.

He made 34 appearances in the 2013–14 campaign, helping the club to reach the League One play-off final. He was an unused substitute at Wembley Stadium as Rotherham secured promotion with a penalty shoot-out victory against Leyton Orient. He was released by the club in May 2014.

=== Port Vale ===
O'Connor signed a one-year contract with League One club Port Vale in July 2014. He scored his first goal for the club on 26 August, hitting the net from 40 yards (37 m) out in a 3–2 League Cup defeat to Cardiff City at Vale Park; this was one of the longest distance goals ever scored by a Vale player, and won him the club's Goal of the Season award. Despite this effort the local newspaper reported that generally throughout the campaign "his contribution is industrious and effective without grabbing the headlines". At the end of the 2014–15 season he was named as the club's Player of the Year, and also won the Supporters' Club's Trophy and was voted Players' Player of the Year. He signed a new contract with the club in June 2015.

He picked up a knee injury in 2015–16 pre-season training and had to wait until October before returning to match fitness. He then lost his first-team place in the new year due to a thigh strain. He retained his first-team place in the second half of the season, but stated that concerns over his contract running down and the daily commute from his Lincolnshire home were becoming a strain, and that he would consider offers from more local clubs in the summer. He won a place on the Football League team of the week after providing an assist, scoring a goal and then having his free-kick deflected in for an own goal in a 3–1 home win over Southend United on 26 February. He was again named in the Football League team of the week after converting two penalties and putting in "a fine-all round performance" in a 4–1 home win over Rochdale on 23 April. He confirmed that he had rejected the offer of a new contract from the club in May 2016.

=== Notts County ===
O'Connor signed a two-year contract with League Two side Notts County in June 2016. He was named as club captain by manager John Sheridan. On 10 December, he was sent off in stoppage time of a 2–0 home defeat to Wycombe Wanderers. The "Magpies" struggled in the first half of the 2016–17 season, but new manager Kevin Nolan said O'Connor had been "pivotal in the turnaround" in the club's form alongside midfield partner Robert Milsom. However, on 17 April he ruptured his anterior cruciate ligament (ACL) in a 3–1 defeat to Portsmouth at Meadow Lane, and was ruled out of action for the rest of the calendar year. Nolan gave him scouting tasks during his long recovery. He managed to make a return to training in February before playing in the last six games of the 2017–18 season to help County to secure a place in the play-offs. He was offered a new contract by Notts County at the end of the 2017–18 season but turned it down in favour of a move elsewhere.

=== Lincoln City ===
On 20 June 2018, O'Connor signed a one-year contract with League Two Lincoln City. In joining Lincoln he turned down offers from Notts County and Grimsby Town. He played 45 times for the "Imps" as they secured promotion as League Two champions at the end of the 2018–19 season; manager Danny Cowley commented that "he's played a big part in the success of the team over this past season". O'Connor went on to sign a new one-year contract and underwent a minor operation to remove a staple in his knee from his previous surgery. He went on to become of the club's most consistent performers in the first half of the 2019–20 season.

=== Salford City ===
On 15 January 2020, O'Connor signed a six-month contract with League Two side Salford City after being signed for an undisclosed fee. His appearances were limited due to the COVID-19 pandemic in England; he scored one goal in eight games for the "Ammies", but was released by manager Graham Alexander at the end of the 2019–20 season.

=== Glenavon ===
On 29 August 2020, O'Connor signed a two-year deal with NIFL Premiership club Glenavon; manager Gary Hamilton described his signing as "a big coup for the club". O'Connor said that he was keen to return to his native Northern Ireland and that the pandemic had caused him to turn down offers from English League Two clubs in order to return to his homeland. He pursued his coaching badges whilst playing part-time for Glenavon. His first goal for the club was a penalty in a 4–4 draw against Coleraine on 7 November. He scored six goals in 23 games during the 2020–21 season. He scored four goals in 34 games during the 2021–22 campaign. He made 18 appearances during the 2022–23 season, scoring one goal.

== Coaching career ==
=== Newry City ===
On 23 May 2023, it was announced that O'Connor had joined Newry City as player/assistant manager to Gary Boyle. Following Newry's 4-0 Boxing Day defeat to Glenavon, Boyle confirmed his resignation as manager and O'Connor also declared that he would leave his role.

=== Coleraine ===
On 25 June 2024, Coleraine announced that O'Connor had been appointed as manager Dean Shiels’ new assistant coach. Commenting upon the appointment, Shiels noted that he had known O'Connor for a long time and that they had been roommates when representing Northern Ireland. On 30 April 2025, the club announced that, with immediate effect, both Shiels and O'Connor would depart their roles with the club.

=== Glenavon ===
On 11 October 2025, O'Connor was appointed manager of Glenavon. The club were bottom of the NIFL Premiership after losing their first 11 games of the 2025–26 season.

== International career ==
O'Connor was a regular captain for Northern Ireland at every youth level up to under-20 and scored six goals at under-17 level. However, O'Connor was called up to play for the Republic of Ireland under-21s for a friendly against Luxembourg in October 2006. He subsequently had to withdraw from the squad. In February 2007, he was also selected for the Republic under-21 squad to play in the Madeira Cup, but did not play in any of the three games involved. On 16 November 2007 he made his debut for the Northern Ireland under-21s, scoring in a 5–0 win against Luxembourg. On 20 November he scored again for the under-21s in a 3–0 win against Moldova. On 6 February 2008 he also played against Israel.

On 26 March 2008, O'Connor made his senior international debut for Northern Ireland in a 4–1 win against Georgia in a friendly at Windsor Park; he came on as a half-time substitute for Damien Johnson. Michael Gault also made his international debut in the same match. He made his competitive debut on 10 September 2008, playing in a 0–0 draw with the Czech Republic in a World Cup qualification match. He won a cap for the Northern Ireland B team in a 3–0 defeat to Scotland B at Broadwood Stadium in Cumbernauld on 6 May 2009. He returned to the international scene after a three-year absence on 10 September 2013, when he featured in a 3–2 defeat to Luxembourg in a World Cup qualification game at Stade Josy Barthel. However, after missing out on the squad selected in March 2015 he said that he was considering his international future.

== Style of play ==
Speaking in July 2014, Crewe Alexandra and Port Vale teammate Tom Pope described O'Connor as "[having] everything. He's got the range of passing, he sits in there and gets the ball moving and he gets stuck in. He whips a great ball in, has great free kicks and a lot of quality." He describes himself as a "passionate" player. However, this has resulted in many yellow cards for dissent.

== Career statistics ==
=== Club ===
Appearances and goals by club, season and competition
Club	Season	League			National cup (Note: Includes FA Cup, Irish Cup)		League cup (Note: Includes Football League Cup, Northern Ireland Football League Cup)		Other		Total	
Club	Season	Division	Apps	Goals	Apps	Goals	Apps	Goals	Apps	Goals	Apps	Goals
Crewe Alexandra	2005–06	Championship	2	0	0	0	0	0	—		2	0
Crewe Alexandra	2006–07	League One	29	0	0	0	2	1	3 (Note: Appearance(s) in Football League Trophy / EFL Trophy)	0	34	1
Crewe Alexandra	2007–08	League One	23	0	0	0	0	0	0	0	23	0
Crewe Alexandra	2008–09	League One	23	3	3	0	3	2	1	0	30	5
Crewe Alexandra	Total		77	3	3	0	5	3	4	0	89	6
Lincoln City (loan)	2008–09	League Two	10	1	—		—		—		10	1
Scunthorpe United	2009–10	Championship	32	2	0	0	4	0	—		36	2
Scunthorpe United	2010–11	Championship	32	8	1	0	3	1	—		36	9
Scunthorpe United	2011–12	League One	33	2	2	0	0	0	1	0	36	2
Scunthorpe United	Total		97	12	3	0	7	1	1	0	108	13
Rotherham United	2012–13	League Two	35	6	4	0	0	0	1	0	40	6
Rotherham United	2013–14	League One	30	2	1	0	2	0	2 (Note: Appearances in play-offs)	0	35	2
Rotherham United	Total		65	8	5	0	2	0	3	0	75	8
Port Vale	2014–15	League One	44	6	1	0	2	1	0	0	47	7
Port Vale	2015–16	League One	26	4	3	1	0	0	0	0	29	5
Port Vale	Total		70	10	4	1	2	1	0	0	76	12
Notts County	2016–17	League Two	32	2	2	0	0	0	0	0	34	2
Notts County	2017–18	League Two	6	0	0	0	0	0	2	0	8	0
Notts County	Total		38	2	2	0	0	0	2	0	42	2
Lincoln City	2018–19	League Two	39	2	3	0	2	1	1	0	45	3
Lincoln City	2019–20	League One	17	1	1	0	2	0	2	0	22	1
Lincoln City	Total		56	3	4	0	4	1	3	0	67	4
Salford City	2019–20	League Two	8	1	—		—		0	0	8	1
Glenavon	2020–21	NIFL Premiership	22	6	1	0	0	0	0	0	23	6
Glenavon	2021–22	NIFL Premiership	32	4	1	0	1	0	0	0	34	4
Glenavon	2022–23	NIFL Premiership	16	1	2	0	0	0	0	0	18	1
Glenavon	Total		70	11	4	0	1	0	0	0	75	11
Newry City	2023–24	NIFL Premiership	0	0	0	0	0	0	0	0	0	0
Career total			491	51	25	1	21	6	13	0	550	58

=== International ===
Appearances and goals by national team and year
National team	Year	Apps	Goals
Northern Ireland	2008	5	0
Northern Ireland	2009	3	0
Northern Ireland	2010	2	0
Northern Ireland	2013	1	0
Total		11	0

== Honours ==
Rotherham United

- Football League One play-offs: 2014
- Football League Two second-place promotion: 2012–13

Lincoln City

- EFL League Two: 2018–19

Individual

- Port Vale Player of the Year: 2014–15
