= Damien Mozika =

French professional footballer (born 1987)

Personal information
- Date of birth: 15 April 1987 (age 39)
- Place of birth: Corbeil-Essonnes, France
- Height: 1.84 m (6 ft 0 in)
- Position: Midfielder

Senior career*
Years	Team	Apps	(Gls)
2005–2008	Nancy B	43	(2)
2007–2008	→ Louhans-Cuiseaux (loan)	28	(0)
2008–2009	Chester City	22	(2)
2009–2010	Tarbiat Yazd	24	(2)
2010–2011	Bury	37	(3)
2011–2013	Scunthorpe United	29	(4)
2013–2014	Torquay United	12	(0)
- * Club domestic league appearances and goals as of 11:51, 3 November 2013 (UTC)

Damien Mozika (born 15 April 1987 in Corbeil-Essonnes) is a French professional footballer who plays as a midfielder. He played in the English Football League for Chester City, Bury, Scunthorpe United and Torquay United.

== Career ==
Mozika arrived at Chester shortly before the start of the 2008–09 season, after spending time on trial with the club. He had previously played in his native France for AS Nancy and CS Louhans-Cuiseaux (on loan).

He made his Football League debut for Chester in a 6–0 defeat to Dagenham & Redbridge on 9 August 2008. Following his debut Mozika's consistent performances led to four unknown Championship clubs making enquiries. He scored his first goal for the club in a 1–1 draw with Bury on 6 September 2008, with a further goal arriving against Chesterfield the following January.

After making just one appearance in a three-month period from January to April 2009 - due to injury, Mozika was suspended by Chester for alleged breaches of discipline shortly before the season ended. He was released at the end of the campaign.

On 19 August 2010, Mozika signed for Bury having previously spent time in Iran with Tarbiat Yazd. The club announced on 9 December 2010 that his contract has been extended until the end of the 2013 season.

Mozika signed for Scunthorpe United on deadline day on 31 August 2011.

He joined Torquay United in October 2013 on a short-term contract, after spending the beginning of the season regaining fitness following an injury sustained in January. He made his Torquay debut as a second-half substitute in the 1-1 draw against Portsmouth on 26 October 2013. On 2 February 2014, Mozika was released from his contract at Torquay United.
