= Robbie Gibbons =

Irish footballer

Personal information
- Full name: Robert James Gibbons
- Date of birth: 8 October 1991 (age 35)
- Place of birth: Knocklyon, Dublin, Ireland
- Height: 1.65 m (5 ft 5 in)
- Position: Midfielder

Youth career
- Knocklyon United
- –2007: Lourdes Celtic
- 2007–2010: Nottingham Forest

Senior career*
| Years | Team | Apps | (Gls) |
| 2010–2011 | Nottingham Forest | 0 | (0) |
| 2011 | Alki Larnaca | 4 | (0) |
| 2012–2013 | Scunthorpe United | 11 | (0) |

International career^{‡}
| 2006–2007 | Republic of Ireland U16 | 2 | (0) |
| 2011 | Republic of Ireland U21 | 1 | (0) |
- * Club domestic league appearances and goals as of 16:32, 7 May 2013 (UTC) ‡ National team caps and goals as of (UTC)

Robert James Gibbons (born 8 October 1991) is an Irish professional footballer.

== Career ==
Gibbons is a left footed centre midfield player, but has also appeared on the left side of midfield for the Forest Reserves. He was given the Forest first team squad number 42 shirt at the beginning of the 2010/11 season and appeared on the bench for Nottingham Forest's defeat to Bradford City in the League Cup in August 2010.

Gibbons signed a four-year contract at Forest in 2007 and he was a key player in the Nottingham Forest F.C. Youth Academy side that reached the Youth Premier League Final in May 2010, losing 5–3 to Arsenal at the Emirates Stadium.

He signed a 3.5 year deal for Alki on 11 January 2011 after spending two weeks on trial at the club and was given the number 32 shirt. Gibbons made his debut for Alki on 16 February 2011, coming off the bench as a second-half substitute in the Larnaca side's 4–3 win in the Cypriot Cup against Enosis Paralimni. Gibbons made his league debut on 19 March 2011.

On 31 January 2012 he signed for Scunthorpe United as free agent after a pay dispute with Alki. After some impressive performances in the reserves he made his first team debut against MK Dons on 14 April 2012.
