= Reece Brown =

Reece Brown may refer to:

- Reece Brown (footballer, born 1991), English footballer
- Reece Brown (footballer, born 1996), English footballer
