= Malaga (disambiguation) =

Málaga, or Malaga, is a port city in the province of Málaga in Andalusia, Southern Spain.

Malaga may also refer to

== Geography ==
=== Spain ===
- Málaga, port city in the province of Málaga in Andalusia, Southern Spain
  - Málaga (Congress of Deputies constituency)
  - Málaga (Senate constituency)
  - Málaga (Parliament of Andalusia constituency)
- Málaga (province), the province that takes its name from that city
  - Vélez-Málaga, Málaga, smaller city in the east of the same Spanish province
  - Málaga (Spanish Congress Electoral District)
  - Málaga (Andalusian Parliament Electoral District)
  - Malaga DO, wine appellation

=== United States ===
- Malaga, California, community in Fresno County, California
- Malaga Island, an island in Maine that housed a small interracial community after the American Civil War
- Malaga, New Jersey, unincorporated area in Franklin Township, Gloucester County, New Jersey
- Malaga, New Mexico, unincorporated area in Eddy County, New Mexico
- Malaga, Ohio, unincorporated area in Ohio
- Malaga, Washington, unincorporated area in Chelan County, Washington

=== Elsewhere ===
- Malaga, Western Australia, suburb of Perth, Western Australia
- Málaga, Santander, municipality in Colombia, capital of the Province of García Rovira, Santander Department, Colombia
- Malaga, Calbayog City, a barangay in Tinambacan District, Calbayog City, Samar, Philippines

== Films ==
- Malaga (1954 film), a film directed by Richard Sale
- Malaga (1960 film), starring Trevor Howard and Dorothy Dandridge

== Other ==
- 352834 Málaga, asteroid named after the Spanish port city
- Malaga (wine), fortified wine originating in Málaga
- Málaga CF, football club in Málaga
- FC Málaga City, football club in Vélez-Málaga
- CD Málaga, former football club in Málaga
- Kévin Malaga (born 1987), French footballer
- SEAT Malaga, model of car
