= James Bailey (footballer) =

English footballer (born 1988)

Personal information
- Full name: James Joseph Bailey
- Date of birth: 18 September 1988 (age 38)
- Place of birth: Bollington, England
- Height: 6 ft 0 in (1.83 m)
- Positions: Midfielder; right back

Youth career
- ?–2007: Crewe Alexandra

Senior career*
Years	Team	Apps	(Gls)
2007–2010	Crewe Alexandra	46	(0)
2010–2014	Derby County	59	(1)
2012	→ Coventry City (loan)	15	(1)
2013	→ Coventry City (loan)	15	(1)
2014–2015	Barnsley	25	(0)
2015–2016	Pune City	8	(1)
2016	Ottawa Fury	29	(0)
2017	Carlisle United	12	(0)
2017–2019	Yeovil Town	24	(1)
Total		233	(5)
- * Club domestic league appearances and goals

James Joseph Bailey (born 18 September 1988) is an English former professional footballer.

He primarily played in midfield, but could also play as a right-back.

Bailey started his career with League One side Crewe Alexandra before moving to Derby County of the Championship in 2010. He spent four years at Derby which was interspersed by two separate loan spells at Coventry City. After short spells at Barnsley, FC Pune City, Ottawa Fury and Carlisle United, he moved to League Two club Yeovil Town in 2017. After struggling to recover from a serious knee injury, and with his contract terminated with Yeovil by mutual consent, Bailey called time on his professional career in 2019.

== Career ==
=== Crewe Alexandra ===
Born in Bollington, England, Bailey started his football career at Bollington United Juniors before joining Crewe Alexandra, where he signed his first professional contract in the summer of 2007.

Bailey made his full Crewe debut at right-back at 19 years of age, when he came on as an 89th-minute substitute for Danny Woodards in a League One home fixture against Doncaster Rovers on 22 December 2007, with Crewe 2–0 down. Doncaster scored twice in the final minute for a final scoreline of 4–0. This proved to be Bailey's sole appearance of the 2007–08 season, but he earned a one-year deal with the club, which he signed in May 2008, with first team coach Steve Holland stating "We are delighted that James has signed a new contract. He has been given another year and we will review it again in relation to his progress. He has made progress this year and now it is up to him to go on again and compete for a place in the squad."

An impressive pre-season saw Bailey return to the side for the opening fixture of the 2008–09 season, where he started in his now familiar midfield role, as Crewe lost 2–1 to Brighton & Hove Albion. Although the season was a disappointing one for Crewe, who were relegated to League Two, it was a personal success for Bailey, as he kept his place in the side with a number of mature performances in central midfield alongside Michael O'Connor and earned a new and improved contract until 2011, as he recorded 31 league and cup appearances throughout the campaign, with only injury preventing him appearing in more after he was ruled out for much of the season from January onwards.

Bailey made his first appearance of 2009–10 season, coming against Dagenham & Redbridge in the opening game of the season, where he played 27 minutes after coming on as a substitute, as Crewe Alexandra lost 2–1. However, he suffered an injury that kept him out for a month. On 3 October 2009, Bailey returned to the starting line–up against Rotherham United and played the whole game, as the club lost 3–2. He then started in the next five matches before suffering a lower abdominal injury that eventually kept him out for three months. On 12 February 2010, Bailey returned to the starting line–up and helped Crewe Alexandra win 2–1 against Burton Albion. He then played a role on assisting goals on three occasions, including two consecutive assists against Barnet and Grimsby Town between 6 March 2010 and 9 March 2010. Despite suffering further injuries later in the season, Bailey retained his position in the first team for the club's 2009–10 season, making 23 appearances in all competitions.

Following the end of the 2009–10 season, his performances for Crewe impressed and he was linked with a move to Championship club Derby County, alongside Crewe teammate John Brayford, in a joint £1m deal in May 2010, where he was seen as a long-term replacement for veteran midfielder Robbie Savage. Crewe confirmed that an offer for the pair, believed to be £1m rising to £1.3m with add-ons and a percentage sell on clause, had been accepted on 18 May 2010.

=== Derby County ===
Bailey formally completed his move to Derby County on 19 May 2010 for an undisclosed fee and took the number 16 shirt, signing a three-year contract. On this signing, Derby manager Nigel Clough said, "James is a determined midfielder who has been impressive every time we have watched him and we're delighted he has… joined us."

He was placed straight into the first team during the club's 2010–11 pre-season fixtures, as a holding midfielder alongside Robbie Savage in a 4–2–3–1 formation, scoring in a 3–3 draw at AFC Bournemouth. His competitive debut for the Rams came in a 2–1 victory at Leeds United in the opening game of the 2010–11 season. His first goal came in a 2–2 draw with Queens Park Rangers in a performance which earned him a place in the Championship Team of the Week for 31 August 2010. Bailey was ever-present in the first 18 games of Derby's 2010–11 campaign, playing every minute of every match and kept two consecutive clean sheets on two separate occasions. However, he only missed his first game in November after being ruled out with the flu. After missing out one match, Bailey returned to the starting line–up against Burnley on 27 November 2010 and played 90 minutes, as the club lost 2–1. He continued to start for Derby County since returning to the first team in nine out of the ten matches for the side. However, during a match against Portsmouth on 5 February 2011, Bailey suffered a groin injury, resulting in him being substituted in the 58th minute and was sidelined for a month. On 19 March 2011 he returned to the first team, coming on as a late substitute in a 2–2 draw against Crystal Palace. He continued to remain involved in the first team for the remainder of the 2010–11 season and went on to make 38 appearances and scoring once in all competitions. Bailey picked up the Sammy Crooks Young Player of the Year award in his first season with the club. Bailey said after picking this award, "It's a great feeling to get the young player of the year award and it's good that the manager has thought highly of me. Hopefully I can press on now and get player of the year, voted by everybody, next season."

Bailey started the 2011–12 season in Derby's first XI, helping them to four wins from their first five games and into second in the table. However, he sustained an ankle injury in training in September 2011 ruled him out for three months. On 26 November 2011 Bailey returned to the starting line–up against West Ham United and played the whole game, as the club lost 3–1. He then started in the midfield position for the next two months before struggling to break into the first team, after losing his place to Jeff Hendrick. In the January transfer window Bailey was linked with moves away from Pride Park with Premier League clubs reportedly interested in the player, but he ended up staying at the club. At the end of the 2011–12 season, Bailey made 24 appearances in all competitions. In May 2012, Derby said they were open to offers for the player and on 22 May 2012, Bailey was transfer listed by the club with a year left on his contract. Clough said the reason why Bailey was transfer listed was down to the form of Hendrick and Craig Bryson in central midfield. In July 2012, Clough said that they had received "one or two" enquiries for Bailey but no firm offers. Despite this Bailey's contract was extended until the summer of 2014.

On 25 September 2012, Bailey joined League One side Coventry City on loan for three months. He made his debut for the club, starting the whole game, in a 6–1 loss against Arsenal in the third round of the League Cup. At the completion of his loan spell, Bailey featured 18 times for Coventry, scoring one goal in Coventry's 1–1 draw at Preston North End on 22 December. He also contributed three consecutive assists between 24 November 2012 and 15 December 2012. Bailey said he was unclear about if he would rejoin the Sky Blues in the January transfer window, stating the Derby and Coventry were in talks over his future. Bailey returned to Coventry on a loan until the end of the 2012–13 season on 1 January. Bailey played a further 15 times in his second loan spell, scoring one goal against Oldham Athletic on 19 January 2013. Following this, he returned to his parent club.

In May, Bailey was placed on Derby County's transfer list with a year left on his contract. However, Bailey was unable to find a club in the summer transfer window and in late August he was ruled out for six weeks with a torn knee ligament. Bailey continued to be rehabilitated throughout the month and made his return in the club's U21 reserves against Hull City U21 reserves; a game which was won by Derby. After the match, Bailey describe his return from injury as 'new lease of life'. Despite being fit throughout the season, Bailey's first team opportunities were hard to come by under Manager Steve McClaren. He made just two Derby County appearances in over a year, against Blackpool and Chelsea.

After four years at the club, Bailey was finally released after his contract expired in the summer.

=== Barnsley ===
Bailey remained a free agent until he signed a two-year deal with League One side Barnsley on 22 July 2014. He was previously linked with a move back to Crewe Alexandra.

Bailey made his Barnsley debut, playing as a right midfielder, in a 1–0 loss to Crawley Town in the opening game of the season. However, he sustained a groin injury which saw him miss four matches and then sent-off after a second bookable offense, in a 2–1 loss against Peterborough United on 18 October 2014. After remaining out of the first team for nearly two months, he made his return in a 2–0 win over Crewe Alexandra on 21 February 2015, playing the full match. Bailey's performance against Colchester United on 6 April 2015 was praised by Manager Lee Johnson. However, he was dropped from the first team for the rest of the season, with Manager Johnson quoting: "His range of passing is very good. But the tactical, physical and mental sides need to be improved." In his first season at Barnsley, Bailey made 29 appearances in all competitions.

However, on 23 July 2015, it was announced that Bailey left the club by mutual consent to allow him to pursue other football opportunities.

=== FC Pune City ===
Bailey was signed by Indian Super League club FC Pune City on 30 July 2015 for the 2015 Indian Super League.

He made his FC Pune City debut, starting a match and played 45 minutes before being substituted, in a 3–1 win against Mumbai City in the opening game of the season. On 2 December 2015, Bailey scored his first goal for the club, in a 3–2 loss against NorthEast United. By the time he departed from FC Pune City, Bailey made eight appearances and scored once in all competitions for the side.

=== Ottawa Fury ===
On 15 January 2016, Bailey signed with the Ottawa Fury.

Bailey made his Ottawa Fury debut in the opening game of the season, starting the whole game, in a 2–1 loss against New York Cosmos. He then played in the first leg of the Canadian Championship Preliminary Round against FC Edmonton and set up the club's first goal of the game, in a 3–0 win. In the return leg, Bailey started the whole game, as Ottawa Fury went through to the next round after winning 3–2 on aggregate. He then became a first team regular for the club, establishing himself in the midfield position.

At the end of the 2016 season, Bailey went on to make 33 appearances in all competitions. Following this, he left the club on 13 December 2016. Reflecting on his time at India and Canada, Bailey said: "I enjoyed my time abroad. To be doing the job I love and get to travel and see different places was great."

=== Carlisle United ===
On 3 February 2017, Bailey returned to English football to sign for League Two club Carlisle United on a short-term contract until the end of the season.

He made his Carlisle United debut, coming on as an 85th-minute substitute, in a 2–1 win against Leyton Orient on 4 February 2017. In a match against Cambridge United on 11 March 2017, Bailey received a straight red card in the 90th minute for "an off the ball incident", as the club lost 3–0. After serving a three match ban, he returned to the starting line–up on 1 April 2017, helping Carlisle United win 3–0. Despite this, Bailey continued to remain involved in the first team for the club and helped Carlisle reach the League Two play-off semi-finals. He played in both legs against Exeter City, as the club lost 6–5 on aggregate.

At the end of the season, having made 14 appearances for the side, Bailey was offered a new contract with the Cumbrian side, but this offer was withdrawn on 9 June 2017.

=== Yeovil Town ===
On 4 July 2017, Bailey signed for fellow League Two club Yeovil Town on a two-year contract. Ahead of the 2017–18 season, he was given a number sixteen shirts, as well as, the club's captaincy.

Bailey made his Yeovil Town debut in the opening game of the season, starting the whole game, as the club lost 8–2 against Luton Town. After the match, he issued an apology on behalf of the players, saying: "We know we let ourselves and the fans down. We felt the same as everyone else connected with the club and know the performance was unacceptable. The support we had at Luton was fantastic and we didn't repay them how we wanted. Most were still there at the end of the game when our performance didn't merit that. As a group, we want to apologise and give fans their money back." In a follow–up match against Accrington Stanley, Bailey made amends for the club's performances and set up a goal for Olufela Olomola, who scored twice, in a 3–2 win. On 26 September 2017 he scored his first goal for Yeovil Town, in a 3–2 win against Chesterfield. Since making his debut for the club, Bailey quickly became a first team regular for Yeovil Town, playing in the midfield position. This lasted until he suffered a knee injury during a 2–0 win against Cheltenham Town on 26 December 2017. Initially out for two to three months, Bailey was sidelined for the rest of the 2017–18 season.

The 2018–19 season saw Bailey continue to recovery from a knee injury. On 1 February 2019, Bailey had his contract with Yeovil terminated by mutual consent on medical grounds having struggled to recover from a serious knee injury.

== Career statistics ==
Appearances and goals by club, season and competition
Club	Season	League			National Cup		League Cup		Other		Total	
Club	Season	Division	Apps	Goals	Apps	Goals	Apps	Goals	Apps	Goals	Apps	Goals
Crewe Alexandra	2007–08	League One	1	0	0	0	0	0	0	0	1	0
Crewe Alexandra	2008–09	League One	24	0	4	0	3	0	0	0	31	0
Crewe Alexandra	2009–10	League Two	21	0	1	0	1	0	0	0	23	0
Crewe Alexandra	Total		46	0	5	0	4	0	0	0	55	0
Derby County	2010–11	Championship	36	1	1	0	1	0	—		38	1
Derby County	2011–12	Championship	22	0	2	0	0	0	—		24	0
Derby County	2012–13	Championship	0	0	—		—		—		0	0
Derby County	2013–14	Championship	1	0	1	0	0	0	—		2	0
Derby County	Total		59	1	4	1	1	0	0	0	64	1
Coventry City (loan)	2012–13	League One	30	2	1	0	1	0	5 (Note: Appearances in Football League Trophy)	0	37	2
Barnsley	2014–15	League One	25	0	2	0	1	0	1	0	29	0
Pune City	2015	ISL	8	1	—		—		—		8	1
Ottawa Fury	2016	NASL	29	0	4	0	—		—		33	0
Carlisle United	2016–17	League Two	12	0	0	0	0	0	2 (Note: Appearances in League Two play-offs)	0	14	0
Yeovil Town	2017–18	League Two	24	1	3	0	1	0	1 (Note: Appearance in EFL Trophy)	0	29	1
Yeovil Town	2018–19	League Two	0	0	0	0	0	0	0	0	0	0
Yeovil Town	Total		24	1	3	0	1	0	1	0	29	1
Career total			233	5	19	0	8	0	9	0	269	5
