= 2012–13 Coventry City F.C. season =

Coventry City
2012–13 season
- Chairman: Vacant
- Manager: Andy Thorn (until 26 August 2012); Mark Robins (19 Sep 2012 – 14 Feb 2013); Steven Pressley (from 8 March 2013)
- Stadium: Ricoh Arena
- League One: 15th
- FA Cup: Third round vs Tottenham Hotspur
- League Cup: Third round vs Arsenal
- Football League Trophy: Area Final vs Crewe Alexandra
- Top goalscorer: League: David McGoldrick 16; All: David McGoldrick 18
- Highest home attendance: 31,054 vs Crewe Alexandra – Johnstone's Paint Trophy – 5 February 2013
- Lowest home attendance: 5,437 vs Burton Albion – Johnstone's Paint Trophy – 4 September 2012
- Average home league attendance: 10,864
Home colours	Away colours

The 2012–13 season was Coventry City's 93rd season in The Football League and their first season in Football League One following relegation from the Football League Championship. In addition to League One, the Sky Blues also entered the League Cup, the FA Cup and the Football League Trophy in the first rounds.

== Review and events ==
=== Monthly events ===
This is a list of the significant events to occur at the club during the 2012–13 season, presented in chronological order. This list does not include transfers, which are listed in the transfers section below, or match results, which are in the results section.

June:

- 7 – The kit for the forthcoming season is revealed.
- 14 – Coventry City draw Dagenham & Redbridge away in the League Cup First Round.
- 18 – Coventry City's fixtures for the 2012–13 Football League One season are announced
- 18 – Assistant Manager Steve Harrison leaves Coventry City by mutual consent, due to cost-cutting measures.
- 20 – Coventry City have transfer embargo lifted after filling accounts and The Football League sign off.
- 26 – Coventry City's sixth game of the season against Stevenage will be shown live on Sky Sports on 9 September.
- 28 – Coventry City appoint former player Richard Shaw as Assistant Manager.

July:

- 1 – Andy Thorn called the players back for training a week early then planned to get the squad ready for the 2012–13 season.
- 23 – Former Coventry City midfielder Ernie Machin died at the age of 68.
- 30 – Squad numbers were released for the forthcoming season.
- 31 – Coventry City are placed in the Northern Section East for the First Round of the Football League Trophy.

August:

- 15 – Coventry City draw Birmingham City at home in the League Cup Second Round.
- 16 – Kevin Kilbane is named new club captain for the 2012–13 season, taking over from Sammy Clingan.
- 16 – Jordan Clarke signed a new contract until 2014, with an option for a further year.
- 18 – Coventry City draw Burton Albion at home in the Football League Trophy First Round.
- 18 – 2012–13 League One season kicks off.
- 26 – Manager Andy Thorn is relieved of managerial duties with immediate effect.
- 26 – Assistant Manager Richard Shaw and First Team Coach Lee Carsley are placed in caretaker charge of first team duties.
- 28 – Carl Baker is named in the Official Football League League One team of the week, following his performance against Bury.
- 30 – Coventry City draw Arsenal away in the League Cup Third Round.

September:

- 8 – Coventry City draw York City away in the Football League Trophy Second Round.
- 19 – Mark Robins is appointed as new Coventry City manager, signing a three-year contract.
- 21 – SISU and The Alan Higgs Trust reach an initial agreement concerning Coventry City buying 50% of the Ricoh Arena.
- 21 – Coventry City appoint Steve Taylor as First Team Coach.

October:

- 2 – Joe Murphy and Reece Brown are named in the Official Football League League One team of the week, following their performances against Oldham Athletic.
- 8 – Joe Murphy is named in the Official Football League League One team of the week, following his clean sheet performance against AFC Bournemouth.
- 13 – Coventry City draw Sheffield United or Notts County at home in the Football League Trophy Northern section quarter-final.
- 16 – David McGoldrick is named in the Official Football League League One team of the week, following his performance against Swindon Town, where he scored two goals.
- 16 – Richard Shaw leaves Coventry City after change to the management structure. Shaw left with immediate effect.
- 16 – Coventry City welcome former physio Dave Hart back to the Ricoh Arena as Mark Robins strengthens his backroom staff as part of a restructuring programme.
- 21 – Coventry City draw Arlesey Town at home in the FA Cup First Round.
- 29 – Cyrus Christie and David McGoldrick are named in the Official Football League League One team of the week, following their performance against Leyton Orient.
- 30 – Coventry City striker David McGoldrick had the third Coventry City goal against York City in the Johnstone's Paint Trophy rewarded to him by the Football League.

November:

- 4 – Coventry City draw Morecambe or Rochdale at home in the FA Cup Second Round.
- 20 – Carl Baker is named in the Official Football League League One team of the week.

December:

- 2 – Coventry City draw Tottenham Hotspur away in the FA Cup Third Round.
- 8 – Coventry City midfielder Kevin Kilbane announced his retirement from professional football.
- 8 – Coventry City draw Bury or Preston North End in the Football League Trophy Area Semi-Final.
- 10 – Cyrus Christie, Carl Baker and David McGoldrick were named in the Official Football League League One team of the week, following the performance against Walsall.
- 12 – Coventry City's Football League Trophy regional semi-final will be shown live on Sky Sports.
- 17 – Coventry City's David McGoldrick is named in the Official Football League League One team of the week.
- 18 – David McGoldrick has been awarded the PFA Fans' Player of the Month award for November.
- 31 – Stephen Elliott is named in the Official Football League League One team of the week.

January:

- 11 – Coventry City have been drawn to play at home first in the two-legged tie in the Football League Trophy against either Crewe Alexandra or Bradford City
- 11 – Mark Robins was named manager of the month for December.
- 11 – David McGoldrick was named player of the month for December.
- 22 – James Bailey and Gary McSheffrey are named in the Official Football League League One team of the week.

February:

- 4 – Leon Clarke was named in the Official Football League League One team of the week after scoring 2 goals in his performance against Sheffield United.
- 14 – Manager Mark Robins leaves Coventry City, along with coach Steve Taylor, after being announced as the new boss of Huddersfield Town.
- 18 – Joe Murphy and Carl Baker were named in the Official Football League League One team of the week following their performances against Bury.

March:

- 1 – Club placed under transfer embargo for failing to file accounts.
- 4 – Deputy Chairman John Clarke resigned from Coventry City Football Club's Board.
- 6 – Coventry City were granted permission to speak to Falkirk manager Steven Pressley about the vacant managerial position.
- 8 – Steven Pressley was unveiled as the new Coventry City manager.
- 11 – Leon Clarke was named in the Official Football League League One team of the week following his performance against Scunthorpe United.
- 20 – Cyrus Christie was named in the Official Football League League One team of the week following his performance versus Hartlepool United/
- 21 – SISU place non-operating subsidiary Coventry City Football Club Ltd into administration.
- 23 – All Coventry City staff based at Ricoh Arena are moved out and club shop stock removed.
- 28 – Leon Clarke and Carl Baker were named in the Official Football League League One top 10 players of the 2012–13 season.
- 28 – An agreement is made between SISU and ACL for remaining 3 league games to be played at Ricoh Arena.
- 28 – Coventry City are deducted 10 points by the Football League for entering administration.

April

- 4 – Cyrus Christie is named in the Official Football League League One team of the week, following his performance against Doncaster Rovers.
- 4 – Coventry City Football Club (Holdings) Ltd appeal against the 10 points deduction against them.
- 8 – Carl Baker is named in the Official Football League League One team of the week, following his performance against Brentford.
- 10 – Coventry City Football Club (Holdings) Ltd withdraw the appeal against the 10 points deduction against them.
- 10 – Coventry City youngsters Cian Harries and George Thomas are called up to the Wales Under-16 squad for the matches in the UEFA Development Tournament.
- 12 – Cian Harries and George Thomas play in 2–0 win for Wales Under-16 against Northern Ireland Under-16.
- 13 – George Thomas plays in 1–1 draw for Wales Under-16 against Faroe Islands Under-16.
- 14 – Cian Harries and George Thomas play in 2–0 win for Wales Under-16 against Iceland Under-16.

== Squad details ==
=== Players info ===
As of 29 April 2013

No.	Name	Nat.	Place of birth	Date of birth	Club apps.	Club goals	Int. caps	Int. goals	Previous club	Date joined	Contract end	Fee
1	Joe Murphy	(Republic of Ireland)	Dublin	21 August 1981	91	0	2	0	Scunthorpe United	1 July 2011	30 June 2014	Free
2	Jordan Clarke	(England)	Coventry	19 November 1991	72	2	–	–	N/A	1 June 2008	30 June 2014	Trainee
4	Conor Thomas	(England)	Coventry	29 October 1993	38	1	–	–	N/A	1 June 2010	30 June 2014	Trainee
5	Nathan Cameron	(England)	Birmingham	21 November 1991	48	0	–	–	N/A	1 June 2009	30 June 2013	Trainee
6	Kévin Malaga	(France)	Toulon	24 June 1987	2	0	–	–	Nice	13 July 2012	30 June 2015	Free
7	David Bell	(Republic of Ireland)	(England) Kettering	21 January 1984	94	5	–	–	Norwich City	30 January 2009	30 June 2015	£500,000
8	Carl Baker	(England)	Whiston	26 December 1982	123	14	–	–	Stockport County	8 January 2010	30 June 2015	Undisclosed
9	Cody McDonald	(England)	Chelmsford	30 May 1986	43	7	–	–	Norwich City	31 August 2011	30 June 2014	£500,000
10	John Fleck	(Scotland)	Glasgow	24 August 1991	35	3	–	–	Rangers	4 July 2012	30 June 2015	Free
11	Gary McSheffrey	(England)	Coventry	13 August 1982	247	61	–	–	Birmingham City	1 July 2010	30 June 2013	Free
12	Steve Jennings	(England)	Liverpool	28 October 1984	39	0	–	–	Motherwell	16 August 2012	30 June 2014	Free
13	Chris Dunn	(England)	Brentwood	23 October 1987	3	0	–	–	Northampton Town	1 July 2011	30 June 2014	Undisclosed
14	Stephen Elliott	(Republic of Ireland)	Dublin	6 January 1984	18	4	9	1	Heart of Midlothian	2 July 2012	30 June 2013	Free
15	Leon Clarke	(England)	Wolverhampton	10 February 1985	12	8	–	–	Charlton Athletic	7 January 2013	30 June 2015	Free
16	Adam Barton	(Republic of Ireland)	(England) Clitheroe	7 January 1991	22	3	–	–	Preston North End	6 August 2012	30 June 2015	Undisclosed
17	Callum Ball	(England)	Leicester	8 October 1992	15	0	–	–	Derby County	19 July 2012	30 June 2013	Loan
18	Shaun Jeffers	(England)	Bedford	14 April 1992	6	0	–	–	N/A	1 June 2009	30 June 2013	Trainee
19	Danny Philliskirk	(England)	Oldham	10 April 1991	1	0	–	–	Sheffield United	7 February 2013	30 June 2013	Free
20	Callum Wilson	(England)	Coventry	27 February 1992	12	1	–	–	N/A	1 June 2009	30 June 2013	Trainee
21	Cyrus Christie	(Republic of Ireland)	(England)	Coventry	30 September 1992	68	2	–	–	N/A	1 June 2010	30 June 2012	Trainee
22	Josh Ruffels	(England)	Oxford	23 October 1993	1	0	–	–	N/A	1 June 2010	30 June 2012	Trainee
23	Lee Burge	(England)	Hereford	9 January 1993	–	–	–	–	N/A	1 June 2010	30 June 2014	Trainee
24	Richard Wood	(England)	Ossett	5 July 1985	117	8	–	–	Sheffield Wednesday	1 January 2010	30 June 2013	Undisclosed
25	William Edjenguélé	(France)	Paris	7 May 1987	33	1	–	–	Panetolikos	17 July 2012	30 June 2015	Free
26	Jordan Willis	(England)	Coventry	24 August 1994	4	0	–	–	N/A	1 June 2011	30 June 2012	Trainee
27	Billy Daniels	(England)	Bristol	3 July 1994	4	0	–	–	N/A	1 June 2011	30 June 2013	Trainee
28	Joe Henderson	(England)	Banbury	2 November 1993	1	0	–	–	N/A	1 June 2011	30 June 2013	Trainee
29	Aaron Phillips	(England)	Warwick	20 November 1993	–	–	–	–	N/A	1 June 2011	30 June 2012	Trainee
30	Will Roberts	(Wales)	Rhuddlan	24 April 1994	1	0	–	–	N/A	1 June 2011	30 June 2013	Trainee
31	Jordan Stewart	(England)	Birmingham	3 March 1982	6	0	–	–	Notts County	1 March 2013	28 May 2013	Free
32	Franck Moussa	(Belgium)	Brussels	24 July 1989	38	6	–	–	Leicester City	21 September 2012	30 June 2014	Free
34	Leon Lobjoit	(England)	Hatfield	4 January 1995	–	–	–	–	Milton Keynes Dons	20 October 2012	30 June 2013	Free
35	Aaron Martin	(England)	Newport	29 September 1989	12	0	–	–	Southampton	25 February 2013	30 June 2013	Loan
36	Louis Garner	(England)	Manchester	31 October 1994	–	–	–	–	N/A	1 June 2011	30 June 2013	Trainee
37	Ryan Haynes	(England)	Northampton	27 September 1995	1	0	–	–	N/A	27 March 2013	30 June 2015	Trainee
38	James Bailey	(England)	Bollington	18 September 1988	30	2	–	–	Derby County	31 December 2012	30 June 2013	Loan
39	Blair Adams	(England)	South Shields	18 September 1991	16	0	–	–	Sunderland	17 January 2013	30 June 2015	Undisclosed

== Matches ==
=== Preseason friendlies ===
14 July 2012	Hinckley United	0–8	Coventry City	Hinckley
15:00		report	McSheffrey 3'; Garner 31'; O'Donovan 35'; Roberts 57', 63'; Willis 64'; Phillips 82'; Jeffers 86'	Stadium: Greene King Stadium; Attendance: 1,872

17 July 2012	Brora Rangers	0–5	Coventry City	Brora
19:30		report	Fleck 1' (pen.), 27', 33' (pen.); Clarke 14'; O'Donovan 54'	Stadium: Dudgeon Park; Attendance: 120

18 July 2012	Ross County	1–0	Coventry City	Inverness
19:30	Craig 88'	report		Stadium: Grant Street Park; Attendance: 350

21 July 2012	Inverness Caledonian Thistle	3–1	Coventry City	Inverness
15:00	Foran 19' (pen.); McKay 49'; Oswell 90'	report	Jeffers 53'	Stadium: Tulloch Caledonian Stadium

28 July 2012	Nuneaton Town	1–0	Coventry City	Nuneaton
15:00	Perry 55'	report		Stadium: Triton Showers Community Arena; Attendance: 2,439

31 July 2012	Wrexham	4–1	Coventry City	Wrexham
19:45	Ogleby 26'; Ashton 28' (pen.); Keates 56'; Hunt 72'	report	Cazarine 90'	Stadium: Racecourse Ground; Attendance: 907

4 August 2012	Accrington Stanley	1–4	Coventry City	Accrington
15:00	Sheppard 70'	report	Fleck 21' (pen.), 41'; McDonald 24', 52'	Stadium: Crown Ground

7 August 2012	Port Vale	0–1	Coventry City	Stoke-on-Trent
14:00		report	McSheffrey 42'	Stadium: Vale Park

11 August 2012	Bristol Rovers	1–2	Coventry City	Bristol
15:00	Harrold 42'	report	McDonald 25', 49'	Stadium: Memorial Stadium

=== League One ===
18 August 2012 1	Yeovil Town	1–1	Coventry City	Yeovil
15:00	Hinds 21'; Reid (yellow card) 51'; Ugwu (substituted off) 60' Marsh-Brown (substituted on) 60'; Foley (substituted off) 78' Ralph (substituted on) 78'; Hayter (substituted off) 81' Young (substituted on) 81'	report	McDonald 10'; Hussey (yellow card) 60'; Fleck (substituted off) 34' McSheffrey (substituted on) 34'; Ball (substituted off) 64' Elliott (substituted on) 64'; Daniels (substituted off) 85' Jennings (substituted on) 85'	Stadium: Huish Park; Attendance: 6,006 (1,995 Sky Blue Army); Referee: David Phillips

21 August 2012 2	Coventry City	1–1	Sheffield United	Coventry
19:45	Elliott 62', (yellow card) 17'; Barton (yellow card) 53'; Elliott (substituted off) 85' Ball (substituted on) 85'; Baker (substituted off) 88' McSheffrey (substituted on) 88'	report	Blackman 84', (yellow card) 88'; Hill (yellow card) 7'; Cofie (substituted off) 61' Miller (substituted on) 61'	Stadium: Ricoh Arena; Attendance: 12,621 (1,570 away); Referee: Paul Tierney

25 August 2012 3	Coventry City	2–2	Bury	Coventry
15:00	Barton 18'; Baker 28'; Baker (substituted off) 70' McSheffrey (substituted on) 70'; McDonald (substituted off) 70' Ball (substituted on) 70'	report	Healy 55' (pen.); John-Lewis 69'; Jones (substituted off) 45' Elford-Alliyu (substituted on) 45'; Byrne (substituted off) 59' Marshall (substituted on) 59'; Healy (substituted off) 62' John-Lewis (substituted on) 62'	Stadium: Ricoh Arena; Attendance: 10,285 (633 away); Referee: Robert Madley

1 September 2012 4	Crewe Alexandra	1–0	Coventry City	Crewe
15:00	Clayton 24'; Ellis (yellow card) 85'; Bunn (substituted off) 73' Tootle (substituted on) 73'	report	Brown (yellow card) 74'; Baker (yellow card) 87'; McDonald (substituted off) 59' McGoldrick (substituted on) 59'; Jennings (substituted off) 66' McSheffrey (substituted on) 66'; Elliott (substituted off) 79' Ball (substituted on) 79'	Stadium: Alexandra Stadium; Attendance: 5,738 (1,548 Sky Blue Army); Referee: Andy Woolmer

9 September 2012 5	Coventry City	1–2	Stevenage	Coventry
13:15	McGoldrick 11'; Kilbane (yellow card) 13'; Baker (yellow card) 16'; Jennings (yellow card) 74'; Elliott (yellow card) 83'; Barton (substituted off) 71' Thomas (substituted on) 71'; Hussey (substituted off) 75' McDonald (substituted on) 75'; Elliott (substituted off) 85' Ball (substituted on) 85'	report	Shroot 21'; Haber 71'; Gray (yellow card) 45+3'; Ashton (substituted off) 46' N'Gala (substituted on) 46'; Shroot (substituted off) 46' Risser (substituted on) 46'; Agyemang (substituted off) 64' Haber (substituted on) 64'	Stadium: Ricoh Arena; Attendance: 9,458 (461 away); Referee: Craig Pawson

15 September 2012 6	Tranmere Rovers	2–0	Coventry City	Birkenhead
15:00	Cassidy 79'; Robinson 83', (yellow card) 84'; Bell-Baggie (substituted off) 73' Thompson (substituted on) 73'; Robinson (substituted off) 85' Harrison (substituted on) 85'; Wallace (substituted off) 90' Kirby (substituted on) 90'	report	Jennings (yellow card) 34'; Baker (substituted off) 73' McSheffrey (substituted on) 73'; Elliott (substituted off) 81' O'Donovan (substituted on) 81'; Jennings (substituted off) 82' Fleck (substituted on) 82'	Stadium: Prenton Park; Attendance: 6,087 (514 Sky Blue Army); Referee: Andy D'Urso

18 September 2012 7	Shrewsbury Town	4–1	Coventry City	Shrewsbury
19:45	Jones 3'; Parry 21'; Richards 62' (pen.); Morgan 64'; Grandison (yellow card) 86'; Richards (substituted off) 71' Wright (substituted on) 71'; Gornell (substituted off) 82' Taylor (substituted on) 82'	report	Fleck 75' (pen.); Edjenguélé (yellow card) 10'; Wood (yellow card) 51'; Baker (substituted off) 46' Fleck (substituted on) 46'; Barton (substituted off) 46' Daniels (substituted on) 46'; Kilbane (substituted off) 63' McSheffrey (substituted on) 63'	Stadium: New Meadow; Attendance: 5,960 (610 Sky Blue Army); Referee: Dean Mohareb

22 September 2012 8	Coventry City	1–2	Carlisle United	Coventry
15:00	McGoldrick 38'; Clarke (yellow card) 18'; Baker (yellow card) 60'; Jennings (substituted off) 23' Henderson (substituted on) 23'; Daniels (substituted off) 64' Reckord (substituted on) 64'; McSheffrey (substituted off) 70' McDonald (substituted on) 70'	report	Cadamarteri 25' (pen.); Livesey 57'; Thirlwell (yellow card) 79'; Thirlwell (substituted off) 82' Potts (substituted on) 82'; Garner (substituted off) 84' Higginbotham (substituted on) 84'; Livesey (substituted off) 89' Edwards (substituted on) 89'	Stadium: Ricoh Arena; Attendance: 10,674 (951 away); Referee: Patrick Miller

29 September 2012 9	Oldham Athletic	0–1	Coventry City	Oldham
15:00	Montano (yellow card) 20'; Croft (yellow card) 60'; Byrne (substituted off) 90' Smith (substituted on) 90'; Wesolowski (substituted off) 90' Simpson (substituted on) 90'	report	McDonald 89'; McGoldrick (yellow card) 93'; Henderson (substituted off) 51' McDonald (substituted on) 51'; McSheffrey (substituted off) 65' Fleck (substituted on) 65'; Clarke (substituted off) 85' Edjenguélé (substituted on) 85'	Stadium: Boundary Park; Attendance: 4,022 (562 Sky Blue Army); Referee: David Coote (referee)

2 October 2012 10	Coventry City	1–1	Milton Keynes Dons	Coventry
19:45	Wood 34'; McSheffrey (yellow card) 41'; Edjenguélé (substituted off) 69' Cameron (substituted on) 69'; McSheffrey (substituted off) 69' Fleck (substituted on) 69'; Barton (substituted off) 78' Ball (substituted on) 78'	report	Gleeson 42'; Otsemobor (yellow card) 90'; Chadwick (substituted off) 73' O'Shea (substituted on) 73'; MacDonald (substituted off) 81' Smith (substituted on) 81'; Powell (substituted off) 90' Lowe (substituted on) 90'	Stadium: Ricoh Arena; Attendance: 9,848 (697 Away); Referee: Robert Madley

6 October 2012 11	Coventry City	1–0	Bournemouth	Coventry
15:00	McGoldrick 61'; Barton (substituted off) 46' Ball (substituted on) 46'; McGoldrick (substituted off) 88' Elliott (substituted on) 88'	report	Carmichael (substituted off) 49' Partington (substituted on) 49'; MacDonald (substituted off) 75' Tubbs (substituted on) 75'; Barnard (substituted off) 80' Fletcher (substituted on) 80'	Stadium: Ricoh Arena; Attendance: 10,458 (740 Away); Referee: James Adcock

13 October 2012 12	Swindon Town	2–2	Coventry City	Swindon
15:00	Roberts 77' (yellow card) 87'; Collins 80' (yellow card) 80'; McEveley (yellow card) 42'; Thompson (yellow card) 43'; Flint (yellow card) 54'; Bostock (substituted off) 51' Rooney (substituted on) 51'; Benson (substituted off) 59' Collins (substituted on) 59'; Ritchie (substituted off) 63' Navarro (substituted on) 63'	report	McGoldrick 13', 37'; Murphy (yellow card) 31'; Ball (yellow card) 54'; Moussa (yellow card) 90+4'; Wood (substituted off) 66' Edjenguélé (substituted on) 66'; Fleck (substituted off) 73' Hussey (substituted on) 73'	Stadium: County Ground; Attendance: 9,808 (700 Sky Blue Army); Referee: Lee Collins

20 October 2012 13	Coventry City	1–2	Notts County	Coventry
15:00	Wood 87'; Bailey (yellow card) 42'; Cameron (yellow card) 76'; Baker (substituted off) 60' Jennings (substituted on) 60'; Bailey (substituted off) 64' McDonald (substituted on) 64'; Reckord (substituted off) 78' Hussey (substituted on) 78'	report	Boucaud 39'; Arquin 84'; Zoko (substituted off) 78' Hughes (substituted on) 78'; Campbell-Ryce (substituted off) 87' Mahon (substituted on) 87'	Stadium: Ricoh Arena; Attendance: 11,882 (1,356 Away); Referee: Phil Gibbs

23 October 2012 14	Brentford	2–1	Coventry City	Brentford
19:45	Forrester 40', 90+4' (pen.) (yellow card) 30'; Hayes (substituted off) 76' Spencer (substituted on) 76'; Diagouraga (substituted off) 88' Adeyemi (substituted on) 88'	report	McGoldrick 7'; Hussey (substituted off) 46' Baker (substituted on) 46'; Reckord (substituted off) 60' Kilbane (substituted on) 60'; Ball (substituted off) 78' McDonald (substituted on) 78'	Stadium: Griffin Park; Attendance: 5,415 (770 Sky Blue Army); Referee: Keith Stroud

27 October 2012 15	Leyton Orient	0–1	Coventry City	Leyton
15:00	Clarke (yellow card) 72'; Chorley (yellow card) 80'; Cox (substituted off) 68' Cook (substituted on) 68'; Brunt (substituted off) 73' Symes (substituted on) 73'	report	McGoldrick 7' (yellow card) 72'; McSheffrey (substituted off) 73' Moussa (substituted on) 73'; McGoldrick (substituted off) 90' Elliott (substituted on) 90'	Stadium: Matchroom Stadium; Attendance: 4,741 (1,172 Sky Blue Army); Referee: Tim Robinson

6 November 2012 16	Coventry City	3–1	Crawley Town	Coventry
19:45	Fleck 9'; McGoldrick 45+1', 65'; McDonald (substituted off) 68' Moussa (substituted on) 68'; Clarke (substituted off) 81' Reckord (substituted on) 81'	report	Clarke 55'; Bulman (substituted off) 71' Ajose (substituted on) 71'; Alexander (substituted off) 83' Akinde (substituted on) 83'	Stadium: Ricoh Arena; Attendance: 8,862 (228 away); Referee: Steven Rushton

10 November 2012 17	Coventry City	1–2	Scunthorpe United	Coventry
15:00	Baker 35'; Wood (yellow card) 42'; Christie (yellow card) 78'; McDonald (substituted off) 55' Ball (substituted on) 55'; Fleck (substituted off) 59' Moussa (substituted on) 59'; Bailey (substituted off) 86' O'Donovan (substituted on) 86'	report	Clarke 43' (pen.), 76'; Walker (yellow card) 80'; Duffy (yellow card) 87'; Ribeiro (substituted off) 46' Kennedy (substituted on) 46'; Walker (substituted off) 90' Mozika (substituted on) 90'	Stadium: Ricoh Arena; Attendance: 9,892 (381 away); Referee: Jeremy Simpson

17 November 2012 18	Hartlepool United	0–5	Coventry City	Hartlepool
15:00	Humphreys (substituted off) 66' Walton (substituted on) 66'; Murray (substituted off) 66' Monkhouse (substituted on) 66'; Poole (substituted off) 77' Wyke (substituted on) 77'	report	Baker 51', 59'; McGoldrick 58' (pen.); Moussa 75'; Barton 78'; Bailey (substituted off) 77' Barton (substituted on) 77'; McGoldrick (substituted off) 83' O'Donovan (substituted on) 83'; Christie (substituted off) 88' Clarke (substituted on) 88'	Attendance: 4,404 (519 Sky Blue Army); Referee: Andy D'Urso

20 November 2012 19	Colchester United	1–3	Coventry City	Colchester
19:45	Eastman 71'; Bean (yellow card) 39'; Henderson (yellow card) 42'; Morrison (yellow card) 66'; Wordsworth (yellow card) 86'; Bean (substituted off) 46' Massey (substituted on) 46'; Henderson (substituted off) 62' Morrison (substituted on) 62'; Eastmond (substituted off) 83' Bond (substituted on) 83'	report	Moussa 34'; Edjenguélé 37'; McGoldrick 87' (yellow card) 67'; McSheffrey (yellow card) 69'; Jennings (yellow card) 71'; McSheffrey (substituted off) 77' Barton (substituted on) 77'	Stadium: Weston Homes Community Stadium; Attendance: 3,229 (408 Sky Blue Army); Referee: Trevor Kettle

24 November 2012 20	Coventry City	1–1	Portsmouth	Coventry
15:00	McSheffrey 40'; Edjenguélé (yellow card) 55'; McSheffrey (substituted off) 79' Barton (substituted on) 79'	report	McLeod 90+4'; Harley (yellow card) 33'; Howard (yellow card) 60'; Allan (substituted off) 46' Mendez-Laing (substituted on) 46'; Benson (substituted off) 63' Jervis (substituted on) 63'; Dumbuya (substituted off) 67' Webster (substituted on) 67'	Stadium: Ricoh Arena; Attendance: 11,295 (819 Away); Referee: Graham Salisbury

8 December 2012 21	Coventry City	5–1	Walsall	Coventry
15:00	Baker 29', 84' (yellow card) 17'; McGoldrick 39', 41' (yellow card) 64'; Christie 61'; Moussa (substituted off) 75' Fleck (substituted on) 75'; McSheffrey (substituted off) 75' McDonald (substituted on) 75'; Bailey (substituted off) 87' Barton (substituted on) 87'	report	Adams 16' (o.g.); Brandy (yellow card) 42'; Featherstone (yellow card) 62'; Butler (yellow card) 64' (yellow-red card) 80'; Taylor (yellow card) 89'; Paterson (substituted off) 67' Chambers (substituted on) 67'; Brandy (substituted off) 85' Downing (substituted on) 85'; Featherstone (substituted off) 86' Hemmings (substituted on) 86'	Stadium: Ricoh Arena; Attendance: 10,986 (1,072 Away); Referee: Patrick Miller

15 December 2012 22	Doncaster Rovers	1–4	Coventry City	Doncaster
15:00	Brown 76'; Keegan (yellow card) 81'; Husband (yellow card) 85'; Cotterill (substituted off) 25' Brown (substituted on) 25'; Quinn (substituted off) 46' Griffin (substituted on) 46'; Harper (substituted off) 73' Clingan (substituted on) 73'	report	Moussa 3'; McGoldrick 26', 58'; Barton 89'; Adams (yellow card) 56'; Moussa (substituted off) 49' Clarke (substituted on) 49'; Barton (substituted off) 90' Thomas (substituted on) 90'	Stadium: Keepmoat Stadium; Attendance: 6,623 (872 Sky Blue Army); Referee: Carl Berry

22 December 2012 23	Coventry City	1–1	Preston North End	Coventry
15:00	Bailey 22'; Jennings (yellow card) 20'; McSheffrey (yellow card) 90'; Moussa (substituted off) 65' Baker (substituted on) 65'; Barton (substituted off) 79' Elliott (substituted on) 79'	report	Holmes 77'; Procter (substituted off) 52' Welsh (substituted on) 52'; Cummins (substituted on) 52'; Amoo (substituted off) 69' Monakana (substituted on) 69'	Stadium: Ricoh Arena; Attendance: 12,230 (638 Away); Referee: Mike Jones

26 December 2012 24	Stevenage	1–3	Coventry City	Stevenage
15:00	Akins 32' (pen.); Morais (substituted off) 61' Freeman (substituted on) 61'; Shroot (substituted off) 67' Tansey (substituted on) 67'; Grant (substituted off) 86' Agyemang (substituted on) 86'	report	Jennings (substituted off) 65' Barton (substituted on) 65'; McSheffrey (substituted off) 72' Fleck (substituted on) 72'; Wood 79'; Murphy (yellow card) 89'; Baker 90'; McGoldrick 90+1' (yellow card) 90+3'	Stadium: The Lamex Stadium; Attendance: 4,102 (1,080 Sky Blue Army); Referee: Dean Whitestone

29 December 2012 25	Milton Keynes Dons	2–3	Coventry City	Denbigh
15:00	Powell 15'; Smith (yellow card) 19'; Lowe 38'; Chicksen (yellow card) 55'; Smith (substituted off) 58' Balanta (substituted on) 58'; Lewington (yellow card) 62'; Alli (substituted off) 71' Ismail (substituted on) 71'; Lowe (substituted off) 78' MacDonald (substituted on) 78'	report	Moussa 27'; Elliot 49', 51'; McSheffrey (yellow card) 62'; Elliot (substituted off) 73' O'Donovan (substituted on) 73'; McSheffrey (substituted off) 78' Barton (substituted on) 78'	Stadium: Stadium mk Attendance: 13,620 (4,988 Sky Blue Army); Referee: Andy Woolmer

1 January 2013 26	Coventry City	0–1	Shrewsbury Town	Coventry
15:00	Fleck (substituted off) 54' Clarke (substituted on) 54'; Jennings (substituted off) 72' Bailey (substituted on) 72'; Wood (yellow card) 78'; Moussa (substituted off) 83' Barton (substituted on) 83'	report	Wildig (substituted off) 20' Hall (substituted on) 20'; Morgan 63'; Rodgers (substituted off) 84' Bradshaw (substituted on) 84'; Taylor (substituted off) 90+2' Mambo (substituted on) 90+2'	Stadium: Ricoh Arena; Attendance: 15,185 (1,413 Away); Referee: Darren Deadman

13 January 2013 27	Carlisle United	1–0	Coventry City	Carlisle
15:00	Robson 2' (yellow card) 90+1'; Potts (substituted off) 78' Thirlwell (substituted on) 78'; Noble (substituted off) 82' Cadamarteri (substituted on) 82'; McGovern (substituted off) 88' Symington (substituted on) 88'	report	Fleck (yellow card) 27'; Moussa (yellow card) 38'; Wood (yellow card) 45+2'; Fleck (substituted off) 54' Elliott (substituted on) 54'; McSheffrey (substituted off) 70' Thomas (substituted on) 70'; Baker (yellow card) 73'; Baker (substituted off) 75' Wilson (substituted on) 75'; Elliott (yellow card) 90+3'	Stadium: Brunton Park; Attendance: 4,071 (520 Sky Blue Army); Referee: David Webb

16 January 2013 28	Coventry City	1–0	Tranmere Rovers	Coventry
19:45	Clarke 20'; Fleck (substituted off) 65' Thomas (substituted on) 65'; Moussa (substituted off) 65' Elliott (substituted on) 65'	report	Bakayogo (yellow card) 58'; Harrison (substituted off) 62' Stockton (substituted on) 62'; O'Halloran (substituted off) 70' McGurk (substituted on) 70'; Amoo (substituted off) 77' Bell-Baggie (substituted on) 77'; Holmes (yellow card) 81'	Stadium: Ricoh Arena; Attendance: 9,668 (487 away); Referee: Gavin Ward

19 January 2013 29	Coventry City	2–1	Oldham Athletic	Coventry
15:00	Jennings (substituted off) 55' Elliott (substituted on) 55'; Fleck (substituted off) 58' Moussa (substituted on) 58'; Elliott 61'; McSheffrey (substituted off) 86' Thomas (substituted on) 86'; Bailey 90+5'	report	Smith (yellow card) 21' (goal) 89'; Mvoto (yellow card) 57'; Simpson (substituted off) 64' Taylor (substituted on) 64'; Mellor (substituted off) 77' Brown (substituted on) 77'; Croft (substituted off) 77' Sutherland (substituted on) 77'; Grounds (yellow card) 78'	Stadium: Ricoh Arena; Attendance: 10,108 (380 away); Referee: Lee Collins

26 January 2013 30	Preston North End	2–2	Coventry City	Preston
15:00	Cummins 30'; Davies (yellow card) 54'; Wroe 60'; Byrom (substituted off) 71' Procter (substituted on) 71'; Cummins (substituted off) 83' Garner (substituted on) 83'; Davies (substituted off) 83' Buchanan (substituted on) 83'	report	Clarke 38'; Robertson 53' (o.g.); Jennings (yellow card) 62'; Fleck (substituted off) 90' Barton (substituted on) 90'; Moussa (yellow card) 90+4'	Stadium: Deepdale; Attendance: 8,474 (767 Sky Blue Army); Referee: David Coote

1 February 2013 31	Sheffield United	1–2	Coventry City	Sheffield
19:45	McMahon (yellow card) 29'; Kitson (yellow card) 37' (goal) 72'; Porter (substituted off) 53' Forte (substituted on) 53'; Murphy (substituted off) 71' Robson (substituted on) 71'; McDonald (yellow card) 86'	report	Clarke 14', 87'; McSheffrey (yellow card) 37'; Christie (yellow card) 65'; Elliott (substituted off) 69' Thomas (substituted on) 69'; McSheffrey (substituted off) 73' Fleck (substituted on) 73'	Stadium: Bramall Lane; Attendance: 17,511 (1,477 Sky Blue Army); Referee: Chris Sarginson

9 February 2013 32	Coventry City	0–1	Yeovil Town	Coventry
15:00	Adams (substituted off) 46' J. Clarke (substituted on) 46'; McSheffrey (substituted off) 53' Elliott (substituted on) 53'; Jennings (substituted off) 72' Fleck (substituted on) 72'	report	Foley (yellow card) 28'; Madden 45+2'; Foley (substituted off) 72' Blizzard (substituted on) 72'; Dawson (yellow card) 87'	Stadium: Ricoh Arena; Attendance: 11,277; Referee: Gary Sutton

16 February 2013 33	Bury	0–2	Coventry City	Bury
15:00	Skarz (yellow card) 21'; Regan (substituted off) 61' Jones (substituted on) 61'; Soares (substituted off) 78' Carole (substituted on) 78'; Ajose (substituted off) 86' Fagan (substituted on) 86'	report	L. Clarke 3'; McSheffrey (yellow card) 28'; Baker 73'; Elliott (substituted off) 74' Moussa (substituted on) 74'; McSheffrey (substituted off) 87' Fleck (substituted on) 87'; Jennings (substituted off) 90+1' Thomas (substituted on) 90+1'	Stadium: Gigg Lane; Attendance: 3,745 (1,241 Sky Blue Army); Referee: Darren Drysdale

23 February 2013 34	Coventry City	1–2	Crewe Alexandra	Coventry
15:00	L. Clarke 12'; Dickinson (yellow card) 22'; Christie (yellow card) 40'; Moussa (yellow card) 85'	report	Ellis 16'; Clayton 78'; Murphy (yellow card) 22'	Stadium: Ricoh Arena; Attendance: 10,139 (383 away); Referee: Darren Sheldrake

26 February 2013 35	Bournemouth	0–2	Coventry City	Bournemouth
19:45	Arter (yellow card) 45+4'; Ritchie (yellow card) 63'; Tubbs (substituted off) 72' Pitman (substituted on) 72'; Fogden (substituted off) 72' Fraser (substituted on) 72'; McQuoid (substituted off) 80' Fletcher (substituted on) 80'	report	Bailey (yellow card) 30'; L. Clarke 45+2'; McSheffrey (yellow card) 59'; McSheffrey (substituted off) 75' Bell (substituted on) 75'; Baker 84' (pen.); Moussa (substituted off) 87' Edjenguélé (substituted on) 87'; L. Clarke (substituted off) 90+2' McDonald (substituted on) 90+2'; Edjenguélé (yellow card) 90+5'; McDonald (yellow card) 90+6'	Stadium: Dean Court; Attendance: 7,411 (727 Sky Blue Army); Referee: Hooper

2 March 2013 36	Coventry City	1–2	Swindon Town	Coventry
15:00	Moussa 2'; McSheffrey (substituted off) 80' Bell (substituted on) 80'; Murphy (yellow card) 82'; Moussa (yellow card) 88'; Moussa (substituted off) 89' McDonald (substituted on) 89'; Jennings (yellow card) 90'	report	N. Thompson (yellow card) 11'; Ferry (substituted off) 66' L. Rooney (substituted on) 66'; Collins (substituted off) 72' A. Rooney (substituted on) 72'; Roberts (substituted off) 82' De Vita (substituted on) 82'; Williams 87'; Ward 90'	Stadium: Ricoh Arena; Attendance: 14,280 (3,000 away); Referee: Mark Heywood

9 March 2013 37	Scunthorpe United	1–2	Coventry City	Scunthorpe
15:00	Sodje 8'; Sodje (substituted off) 73' Alabi (substituted on) 73'; Barcham (substituted off) 87' Jennings (substituted on) 87'	report	Bailey (yellow card) 33'; Baker 45'; L. Clarke 77'; McSheffrey (substituted off) 78' Fleck (substituted on) 78'; Baker (substituted off) 90+3' Willis (substituted on) 90+3'	Stadium: Glanford Park; Attendance: 3,676 (723 Sky Blue Army); Referee: Anthony Bates

12 March 2013 38	Coventry City	2–2	Colchester United	Coventry
19:45	McSheffrey (substituted off) 73' Fleck (substituted on) 73'; Moussa (substituted off) 73' Wilson (substituted on) 73'; Wilson 77'; Jennings (yellow card) 87'; Baker 90'	report	Massey 39'; Smith 72'; Smith (substituted off) 79' Ladapo (substituted on) 79'; Morrison (substituted off) 84' Compton (substituted on) 84'; Garmston (substituted off) 89' White (substituted on) 89'	Stadium: Ricoh Arena; Attendance: 9,431 (173 away); Referee: Steve Martin

16 March 2013 39	Coventry City	1–0	Hartlepool United	Coventry
15:00	McDonald 33'; McDonald (substituted off) 70' Wilson (substituted on) 70'; Moussa (substituted off) 78' Fleck (substituted on) 78'; McSheffrey (substituted off) 89' Bell (substituted on) 89'	report	Sweeney (substituted off) 72' Howard (substituted on) 72'; Wyke (substituted off) 80' James (substituted on) 80'; Franks (substituted off) 80' Monkhouse (substituted on) 80'; Humphreys (yellow card) 90+5'	Stadium: Ricoh Arena; Attendance: 10,412 (272 away); Referee: Fred Graham

23 March 2013 40	Portsmouth	2–0	Coventry City	Portsmouth
15:00	Wallace 15'; Walker (yellow card) 55'; Rocha (yellow card) 75'; Agyemang 76'	report	Jennings (substituted off) 65' Wilson (substituted on) 65'; McSheffrey (substituted off) 65' Thomas (substituted on) 65'; Wilson (yellow card) 74'; Stewart (substituted off) 80' Ball (substituted on) 80'	Stadium: Fratton Park; Attendance: 12,601 (1,079 Sky Blue Army); Referee: Phil Gibbs

30 March 2013 41	Coventry City	1–0	Doncaster Rovers	Coventry
15:00	Christie 13'	report		Stadium: Ricoh Arena; Referee: Mark Halsey

1 April 2013 42	Walsall	4–0	Coventry City	Walsall
15:00	Paterson 33', 87'; Westcarr 54', 74' (pen.), (yellow card) 71'	report	Stewart (yellow card) 42' (yellow-red card) 65'; Ball (yellow card) 56'; J. Clarke (yellow card) 72'; Christie (yellow card) 76'	Stadium: Bescot Stadium; Attendance: 7,504 (Sky Blue Army 2,459); Referee: Trevor Kettle

6 April 2013 43	Coventry City	1–1	Brentford	Coventry
15:00	Baker 45' (pen.); Wilson (yellow card) 24'; Fleck (yellow card) 57'	report	Forrester 47'; Craig (yellow card) 43'; Forshaw (yellow card) 48'; Saunders (yellow card) 90+4'	Stadium: Ricoh Arena; Attendance: 10,642 (1,649 away); Referee: Scott Mathieson

13 April 2013 44	Crawley Town	2–0	Coventry City	Crawley
15:00	Clarke 15'; Essam 60'; Hunt (yellow card) 16'; Torres (yellow card) 90'	report	Thomas (yellow card) 54'	Stadium: Broadfield Stadium; Attendance: 3,900 (687 Sky Blue Army); Referee: Rob Lewis

20 April 2013 45	Coventry City	0–1	Leyton Orient	Coventry
15:00	Wood (yellow card) 23'; Bell (yellow card) 37'; Christie (yellow card) 39'; J. Clarke (yellow card) 50'	report	Cox 45+1'; Rowlands (yellow card) 40'; Clarke (yellow card) 77'	Stadium: Ricoh Arena; Attendance: 11,234 (893 away); Referee: Eddie Ilderton

27 April 2013 46	Notts County	2–2	Coventry City	Nottingham
15:00	Waite 34'; Sheehan (yellow card) 42'; Waite (substituted off) 46' Boucaud (substituted on) 46'; Pearce 54'; Labadie (substituted off) 63' Bishop (substituted on) 63'	report	Adams (yellow card) 45+1'; Wilson (substituted off) 46' McDonald (substituted on) 46'; Fleck 50'; Barton (substituted off) 70' Moussa (substituted on) 70'; Moussa 86'	Stadium: Meadow Lane; Attendance: 7,608 (1,477 Sky Blue Army); Referee: David Webb

=== League Cup ===
14 August 2012 Round 1	Dagenham & Redbridge	0–1	Coventry City	Dagenham
19:45	Woodall (substituted off) 56' Williams (substituted on) 56'; Scott (substituted off) 66' Reed (substituted on) 66'; Ilesanmi (yellow card) 88'; Spillane (yellow card) 89'	report	McSheffrey (substituted off) 70' Elliott (substituted on) 70'; Elliott (yellow card) 77'; Ball (substituted off) 85' O'Donovan (substituted on) 85'; Kilbane 90' (pen.) (yellow card) 90+2'	Stadium: The L.B Barking & Dagenham Stadium; Attendance: 1,904 (580 Sky Blue Army); Referee: Iain Williamson

28 August 2012 Round 2	Coventry City	3–2 (a.e.t.)	Birmingham City	Coventry
19:45	McDonald 20' (yellow card) 61'; Kilbane 22'; Edjenguélé (yellow card) 25'; Willis (substituted off) 63' Christie (substituted on) 63'; Barton (substituted off) 80' McSheffrey (substituted on) 80'; McDonald (substituted off) 90' Ball (substituted on) 90'; Baker 97'	report	Løvenkrands 4'; Spector 44'; Gordon (substituted off) 66' Redmond (substituted on) 66'; Mullins (yellow card) 67'; Davies (substituted off) 71' Ibáñez (substituted on) 71'; Løvenkrands (substituted off) 79' Rooney (substituted on) 79'; Gomis (yellow card) 109'	Stadium: Ricoh Arena; Attendance: 10,859 (3,859 away fans); Referee: Dean Whitestone

26 September 2012 Round 3	Arsenal	6–1	Coventry City	London
19:45	Giroud 39'; Oxlade-Chamberlain 57'; Arshavin 63'; Oxlade-Chamberlain (substituted off) 72' Gnabry (substituted on) 72'; Coquelin (substituted off) 72' Frimpong (substituted on) 72'; Giroud (substituted off) 72' Chamakh (substituted on) 72'; Walcott 74', 90'; Miquel 80'	report	Brown (yellow card) 49'; Moussa (substituted off) 60' Fleck (substituted on) 60'; Elliott (substituted off) 69' Ball (substituted on) 69'; Ball 78'	Stadium: Emirates Stadium; Attendance: 58,351 (7,956 Sky Blue Army); Referee: Mike Jones

=== FA Cup ===
3 November 2012 Round 1	Coventry City	3–0	Arlesey Town	Coventry
15:00	Ball 28'; Christie 63'; Jennings 89'; Clarke (yellow card) 79'	report	Dillon (yellow card) 49'; Thurlbourne (yellow card) 79'	Stadium: Ricoh Arena; Attendance: 6,594 (577 away); Referee: Kevin Wright

1 December 2012 Round 2	Coventry City	2–1	Morecambe	Coventry
15:00	McSheffrey 38' (pen.); Baker 46'; O'Donovan (yellow card) 77'	report	Ellison 77'; Fleming (yellow card) 79'	Stadium: Ricoh Arena; Attendance: 6,339 (610 away fans); Referee: Carl Boyeson

5 January 2013 Round 3	Tottenham Hotspur	3–0	Coventry City	London
15:00	Dempsey 14', 37'; Bale 33'; Bale (substituted off) 70' Townsend (substituted on) 70'; Sigurðsson (substituted off) 79' Carroll (substituted on) 79'; Parker (substituted off) 79' Dembélé (substituted on) 79'	report	Bailey (yellow card) 12'; Moussa (substituted off) 50' Barton (substituted on) 50'; Bailey (substituted off) 59' Thomas (substituted on) 59'; Baker (yellow card) 65'; Jennings (substituted off) 70' Fleck (substituted on) 70'	Stadium: White Hart Lane; Attendance: 35,766 (5,021 Sky Blue Army); Referee: Michael Naylor

=== Football League Trophy ===
4 September 2012 Round 1	Coventry City	0–0 (10–9 p)	Burton Albion	Coventry
19:45		report		Stadium: Ricoh Arena; Attendance: 5,437 (290 away fans); Referee: Oliver Langford
	Penalties
	McSheffrey (penalty scored); Baker (penalty scored); McGoldrick (penalty scored); Kilbane (penalty scored); Elliott (penalty scored); Daniels (penalty scored); Brown (penalty scored); Hussey (penalty scored); Christie (penalty scored); Wood (penalty missed); Murphy (penalty scored)		Taylor (penalty scored); Palmer (penalty scored); McCrory (penalty scored); Webster (penalty scored); Richards (penalty scored); Bell (penalty scored); Yussuf (penalty scored); Dyer (penalty scored); Corbett (penalty scored); Holness (penalty missed); Lyness (penalty missed)

9 October 2012 Round 2	York City	0–4	Coventry City	York
19:45	Chambers (yellow card) 82'	report	McGoldrick 58', 81'; Ball 72'; Hussey 90'; Baker (yellow card) 67'	Stadium: Bootham Crescent; Attendance: 2,771 (374 Sky Blue Army); Referee: Geoff Eltringham

4 December 2012 Quarter-Final	Coventry City	1–1 (4–1 p)	Sheffield United	Coventry
19:45	Maguire 58' (o.g.)	report	McAllister 81'	Stadium: Ricoh Arena; Attendance: 10,162 (636 away); Referee: Mark Brown
	Penalties
	McSheffrey (penalty scored); McGoldrick (penalty scored); Baker (penalty scored); Fleck (penalty scored)		Ironside (penalty scored); Maguire (penalty missed); Flynn (penalty missed)

10 January 2013 Semi-Final	Coventry City	3–2	Preston North End	Coventry
19:45	Jennings 41'; Bailey (substituted off) 53' Thomas (substituted on) 53'; Jennings (substituted off) 75' Moussa (substituted on) 75'; McSheffrey (substituted off) 86' Elliott (substituted on) 86'; Baker 90+2'; L. Clarke 90+3' (yellow card) 90+5'	report	Cansdell-Sherriff (substituted off) 18' Robertson (substituted on) 18'; Garner (yellow card) 24'; Byrom (substituted off) 56' Monakana (substituted on) 56'; Foster 67'; Beavon 80'; Beavon (substituted off) 82' Procter (substituted on) 82'	Stadium: Ricoh Arena; Attendance: 12,665 (485 away); Referee: Robert Madley

5 February 2013 Area-Final; First Leg	Coventry City	0–3	Crewe Alexandra	Coventry
19:45	Murphy (substituted off) 46' Dunn (substituted on) 46'; Elliott (substituted off) 74' Ball (substituted on) 74'; McSheffrey (substituted off) 81' Bailey (substituted on) 81'	report	Inman 52', 77'; Inman (substituted off) 82' Robertson (substituted on) 82'; Leitch-Smith 85'	Stadium: Ricoh Arena; Attendance: 31,054 (1,472 away); Referee: Graham Salisbury

20 February 2013 Area-Final; Second Leg	Crewe Alexandra	0–2	Coventry City	Crewe
19:30	Osman (yellow card) 22'; Leitch-Smith (substituted off) 82' Moore (substituted on) 82'	report	Wood (substituted off) 58' J. Clarke (substituted on) 58'; L. Clarke (yellow card) 67' (goal) 90+4'; Elliott (substituted off) 67' Wilson (substituted on) 67'; Murphy (yellow card) 73'; Bailey (substituted off) 74' Fleck (substituted on) 74'; Ellis 90+3' (o.g.)	Stadium: Alexandra Stadium; Attendance: 8,325 (2,268 Sky Blue Army); Referee: Graham Scott

== League One ==
=== League table ===
Pos	Team	Pld	W	D	L	GF	GA	GD	Pts
13	Crewe Alexandra	46	18	10	18	54	62	−8	64
14	Preston North End	46	14	17	15	54	49	+5	59
15	Coventry City	46	18	11	17	66	59	+7	55 (Note: On 28 March Coventry City were deducted ten points for entering administration.)
16	Shrewsbury Town	46	13	16	17	54	60	−6	55
17	Carlisle United	46	14	13	19	56	77	−21	55

Updated to match(es) played on 27 April 2013. Source: BBC Sport
Rules for classification: 1) Points; 2) Goal difference; 3) Number of goals scored

=== Results summary ===
Overall								Home						Away					
Pld	W	D	L	GF	GA	GD	Pts	W	D	L	GF	GA	GD	W	D	L	GF	GA	GD
46	18	11	17	66	59	+7	65	7	7	9	29	27	+2	11	4	8	37	32	+5

Last updated: 29 April 2013.
Source: CCFC League One Results

=== Round by round ===
Round	1	2	3	4	5	6	7	8	9	10	11	12	13	14	15	16	17	18	19	20	21	22	23	24	25	26	27	28	29	30	31	32	33	34	35	36	37	38	39	40	41	42	43	44	45	46
Ground	A	H	H	A	H	A	A	H	A	H	H	A	H	A	A	H	H	A	A	H	H	A	H	A	A	H	A	H	H	A	A	H	A	H	A	H	A	H	H	A	H*	A	H	A	H	A
Result	D	D	D	L	L	L	L	L	W	D	W	D	L	L	W	W	L	W	W	D	W	W	D	W	W	L	L	W	W	D	W	L	W	L	W	L	W	D	W	L	W	L	D	L	L	D
Position	9	15	14	17	20	23	23	23	22	22	20	20	21	21	21	19	20	16	15	15	15	13	13	11	9	11	13	10	7	7	7	8	8	8	8	9	8	9	8	10	14	14	14	16	16	15

Updated to match(es) played on 29 April 2013. Source: League One Results
A = Away; H = Home; W = Win; D = Draw; L = Loss

* 10 points were deducted from Coventry City's league total prior to the playing of the round 41 match.

=== Scores overview ===
Opposition	Home Score	Away Score	Double
Bournemouth	1–0	2–0	Coventry City Do Double
Brentford	1–1	1–2	
Bury	2–2	2–0	
Carlisle United	1–2	0–1	Carlisle United Do Double
Colchester United	2–2	3–1	
Crawley Town	3–1	0–2	
Crewe Alexandra	1–2	0–1	Crewe Alexandra Do Double
Doncaster Rovers	1–0	4–1	Coventry City Do Double
Hartlepool United	1–0	5–0	Coventry City Do Double
Leyton Orient	0–1	1–0	
Milton Keynes Dons	1–1	3–2	
Notts County	1–2	2–2	
Oldham Athletic	2–1	1–0	Coventry City Do Double
Portsmouth	1–1	0–2	
Preston North End	1–1	2–2	
Scunthorpe United	1–2	2–1	
Sheffield United	1–1	2–1	
Shrewsbury Town	0–1	1–4	Shrewsbury Town Do Double
Stevenage	1–2	3–1	
Swindon Town	1–2	2–2	
Tranmere Rovers	1–0	0–2	
Walsall	5–1	0–4	
Yeovil Town	0–1	1–1	

== Season statistics ==
=== Starts and goals ===
As of 23 March 2013

No.	Pos	Nat	Player	Total		League One		FA Cup		League Cup		League Trophy	
No.	Pos	Nat	Player	Apps	Goals	Apps	Goals	Apps	Goals	Apps	Goals	Apps	Goals
1	GK	(Republic of Ireland) IRL	Joe Murphy	56	0	45+0	0	2+0	0	3+0	0	6+0	0
2	DF	(England) ENG	Jordan Clarke	28	0	15+5	0	2+1	0	2+0	0	3+0	0
4	MF	(England) ENG	Conor Thomas	13	0	2+9	0	0+1	0	0+0	0	0+1	0
5	DF	(England) ENG	Nathan Cameron (on loan at Northampton Town)	11	0	8+1	0	0+0	0	0+0	0	2+0	0
6	DF	(France) FRA	Kévin Malaga	2	0	2+0	0	0+0	0	0+0	0	0+0	0
7	MF	(Republic of Ireland) IRL	David Bell	7	0	2+5	0	0+0	0	0+0	0	0+0	0
8	MF	(England) ENG	Carl Baker	55	15	41+2	12	3+0	1	3+0	1	6+0	1
9	FW	(England) ENG	Cody McDonald	24	4	9+11	3	0+1	0	2+0	1	1+0	0
10	MF	(Scotland) SCO	John Fleck	42	3	22+13	3	1+1	0	0+1	0	2+2	0
11	MF	(England) ENG	Gary McSheffrey	43	2	26+6	1	3+0	1	2+1	0	5+0	0
12	MF	(England) ENG	Steve Jennings	49	2	36+3	0	3+0	1	1+0	0	5+1	1
13	GK	(England) ENG	Chris Dunn	3	0	1+0	0	1+0	0	0+0	0	0+1	0
14	FW	(Republic of Ireland) IRL	Stephen Elliott	24	4	11+7	4	0+0	0	1+1	0	2+2	0
15	FW	(England) ENG	Leon Clarke	16	10	11+1	8	1+0	0	0+0	0	3+0	2
16	MF	(Republic of Ireland) IRL	Adam Barton	26	3	14+8	3	1+1	0	2+0	0	0+0	0
17	FW	(England) ENG	Callum Ball (on loan from Derby County)	21	3	6+9	0	1+0	1	1+2	1	1+1	1
18	FW	(England) ENG	Shaun Jeffers	0	0	0+0	0	0+0	0	0+0	0	0+0	0
19	FW	(England) ENG	Danny Philliskirk	1	0	1+0	0	0+0	0	0+0	0	0+0	0
20	FW	(England) ENG	Callum Wilson	12	1	3+8	1	0+0	0	0+0	0	0+1	0
21	DF	(Republic of Ireland) IRL	Cyrus Christie	39	3	31+0	2	2+0	1	0+1	0	4+1	0
22	MF	(England) ENG	Josh Ruffels	0	0	0+0	0	0+0	0	0+0	0	0+0	0
23	GK	(England) ENG	Lee Burge (on loan at Nuneaton Town)	0	0	0+0	0	0+0	0	0+0	0	0+0	0
24	DF	(England) ENG	Richard Wood	46	3	36+0	3	2+0	0	2+0	0	6+0	0
25	DF	(France) FRA	William Edjenguélé	39	1	30+2	1	3+0	0	1+0	0	3+0	0
26	DF	(England) ENG	Jordan Willis	3	0	0+1	0	0+1	0	1+0	0	0+0	0
27	FW	(England) ENG	Billy Daniels	6	0	3+1	0	0+0	0	1+0	0	0+1	0
28	DF	(England) ENG	Joe Henderson	0	0	0+0	0	0+0	0	0+0	0	0+0	0
29	DF	(England) ENG	Aaron Phillips (on loan at Nuneaton Town)	0	0	0+0	0	0+0	0	0+0	0	0+0	0
30	MF	(Wales) WAL	Will Roberts	0	0	0+0	0	0+0	0	0+0	0	0+0	0
31	DF	(England) ENG	Jordan Stewart	6	0	6+0	0	0+0	0	0+0	0	0+0	0
32	MF	(Belgium) BEL	Franck Moussa	46	6	31+7	6	3+0	0	1+0	0	3+1	0
33	DF	(England) ENG	Ryan Haynes	1	0	1+0	0	0+0	0	0+0	0	0+0	0
34	MF	(England) ENG	Leon Lobjoit	0	0	0+0	0	0+0	0	0+0	0	0+0	0
35	DF	(England) ENG	Aaron Martin (on loan from Southampton)	12	0	12+0	0	0+0	0	0+0	0	0+0	0
36	MF	(England) ENG	Louis Garner	0	0	0+0	0	0+0	0	0+0	0	0+0	0
38	MF	(England) ENG	James Bailey (on loan from Derby County)	37	2	29+1	2	1+0	0	1+0	0	4+1	0
39	DF	(England) ENG	Blair Adams	21	0	16+0	0	2+0	0	0+0	0	3+0	0
Players played for Coventry this season who left before the season ended or retired:
3	DF	(England) ENG	Carl Dickinson (on loan from Watford)	7	0	6+0	0	0+0	0	0+0	0	1+0	0
3	DF	(England) ENG	Chris Hussey	14	1	8+2	0	0+0	0	2+0	0	1+1	1
15	MF	(Republic of Ireland) IRL	Kevin Kilbane	12	2	8+1	0	0+0	0	2+0	2	1+0	0
19	FW	(Republic of Ireland) IRL	Roy O'Donovan	7	0	0+4	0	1+1	0	0+1	0	0+0	0
31	FW	(Republic of Ireland) IRL	David McGoldrick (on loan from Nottingham Forest)	25	18	21+1	16	0+0	0	0+0	0	3+0	2
35	DF	(England) ENG	Reece Brown (on loan from Manchester United)	10	0	6+0	0	0+0	0	3+0	0	1+0	0
34	DF	(England) ENG	Jamie Reckord (on loan from Wolverhampton Wanderers)	12	0	7+2	0	1+0	0	1+0	0	1+0	0
37	MF	(Republic of Ireland) IRL	Conor Henderson (on loan from Arsenal)	2	0	1+1	0	0+0	0	0+0	0	0+0	0

=== Goalscorers ===
No.	Flag	Pos	Name	League One	FA Cup	League Cup	Football League Trophy	Total
31	(Republic of Ireland)	FW	David McGoldrick	16	0	0	2	18
8	(England)	MF	Carl Baker	12	1	1	1	15
15	(England)	FW	Leon Clarke	8	0	0	2	10
32	(Belgium)	MF	Franck Moussa	6	0	0	0	6
9	(England)	FW	Cody McDonald	3	0	1	0	4
14	(Republic of Ireland)	FW	Stephen Elliott	4	0	0	0	4
10	(Scotland)	MF	John Fleck	3	0	0	0	3
16	(Republic of Ireland)	MF	Adam Barton	3	0	0	0	3
17	(England)	FW	Callum Ball	0	1	1	1	3
21	(Republic of Ireland)	DF	Cyrus Christie	2	1	0	0	3
24	(England)	DF	Richard Wood	3	0	0	0	3
			Own goal	1	0	0	2	3
11	(England)	MF	Gary McSheffrey	1	1	0	0	2
12	(England)	MF	Steve Jennings	0	1	0	1	2
15	(Republic of Ireland)	MF	Kevin Kilbane	0	0	2	0	2
38	(England)	MF	James Bailey	2	0	0	0	2
3	(England)	DF	Chris Hussey	0	0	0	1	1
20	(England)	FW	Callum Wilson	1	0	0	0	1
25	(France)	DF	William Edjenguélé	1	0	0	0	1

=== Assists ===
No.	Flag	Pos	Name	League One	FA Cup	League Cup	Football League Trophy	Total
11	(England)	MF	Gary McSheffrey	7	0	1	0	8
8	(England)	MF	Carl Baker	4	0	1	1	6
32	(Belgium)	MF	Franck Moussa	3	1	0	1	5
38	(England)	MF	James Bailey	4	0	0	1	5
10	(Scotland)	MF	John Fleck	4	0	0	0	4
2	(England)	DF	Jordan Clarke	2	0	0	0	2
9	(England)	FW	Cody McDonald	2	0	0	0	2
21	(Republic of Ireland)	DF	Cyrus Christie	2	0	0	0	2
31	(Republic of Ireland)	FW	David McGoldrick	2	0	0	0	2
39	(England)	DF	Blair Adams	2	0	0	0	2
1	(Republic of Ireland)	GK	Joe Murphy	0	0	0	1	1
14	(Republic of Ireland)	FW	Stephen Elliott	1	0	0	0	1
15	(Republic of Ireland)	MF	Kevin Kilbane	0	0	1	0	1
16	(Republic of Ireland)	MF	Adam Barton	1	0	0	0	1
17	(England)	FW	Callum Ball	1	0	0	0	1
19	(Republic of Ireland)	FW	Roy O'Donovan	0	1	0	0	1
24	(England)	DF	Richard Wood	1	0	0	0	1
25	(France)	DF	William Edjenguélé	0	0	0	1	1
31	(England)	DF	Jordan Stewart	1	0	0	0	1
34	(England)	DF	Jamie Reckord	1	0	0	0	1

=== Yellow cards ===
No.	Flag	Pos	Name	League One	FA Cup	League Cup	Football League Trophy	Total
8	(England)	MF	Carl Baker	5	1	0	1	7
12	(England)	MF	Steve Jennings	7	0	0	0	7
11	(England)	MF	Gary McSheffrey	7	0	0	0	7
21	(Republic of Ireland)	DF	Cyrus Christie	5	0	0	0	5
31	(Republic of Ireland)	FW	David McGoldrick	5	0	0	0	5
24	(England)	DF	Richard Wood	5	0	0	0	5
38	(England)	MF	James Bailey	3	1	0	0	4
2	(England)	DF	Jordan Clarke	3	1	0	0	4
25	(France)	DF	William Edjenguélé	3	0	1	0	4
14	(Republic of Ireland)	FW	Stephen Elliott	3	0	1	0	4
32	(Belgium)	MF	Franck Moussa	4	0	0	0	4
1	(Republic of Ireland)	GK	Joe Murphy	3	0	0	1	4
39	(England)	DF	Blair Adams	2	0	0	0	2
17	(England)	FW	Callum Ball	2	0	0	0	2
35	(England)	DF	Reece Brown	1	0	1	0	2
10	(Scotland)	MF	John Fleck	2	0	0	0	2
15	(Republic of Ireland)	MF	Kevin Kilbane	1	0	1	0	2
9	(England)	FW	Cody McDonald	1	0	1	0	2
20	(England)	FW	Callum Wilson	2	0	0	0	2
16	(Republic of Ireland)	MF	Adam Barton	1	0	0	0	1
7	(Republic of Ireland)	MF	David Bell	1	0	0	0	1
5	(England)	DF	Nathan Cameron	1	0	0	0	1
15	(England)	FW	Leon Clarke	0	0	0	1	1
3	(England)	DF	Carl Dickinson	1	0	0	0	1
3	(England)	DF	Chris Hussey	1	0	0	0	1
19	(Republic of Ireland)	FW	Roy O'Donovan	0	1	0	0	1
31	(England)	DF	Jordan Stewart	1	0	0	0	1
4	(England)	MF	Conor Thomas	1	0	0	0	1

=== Red cards ===
No.	Flag	Pos	Name	League One	FA Cup	League Cup	Football League Trophy	Total
31	(England)	DF	Jordan Stewart	1	0	0	0	(red card) 1

=== Captains ===
No.	Pos.	Name	Starts
8	MF	(England) Carl Baker	31
15	MF	(Republic of Ireland) Kevin Kilbane	11
24	DF	(England) Richard Wood	3
12	MF	(England) Steve Jennings	1

=== Penalties awarded ===
Date	Success?	Penalty taker	Opponent	Competition
14 August 2012	✓	(Republic of Ireland) Kevin Kilbane	Dagenham & Redbridge	League Cup
18 September 2012	✓	(Scotland) John Fleck	Shrewsbury Town	League One
17 November 2012	✓	(Republic of Ireland) David McGoldrick	Hartlepool United	League One
1 December 2012	✓	(England) Gary McSheffrey	Morecambe	FA Cup
26 February 2013	✓	(England) Carl Baker	Bournemouth	League One
23 March 2013	✗	(England) Gary McSheffrey	Portsmouth	League One

=== Suspensions served ===
Date	Matches missed	Suspended player	Reason	Missed opponents
15 December 2012	1	(England) Carl Baker	Reached 5 yellow cards	Doncaster Rovers (A)
29 December 2012	1	(Republic of Ireland) David McGoldrick	Reached 5 yellow cards	Milton Keynes Dons (A)
6 April 2013	2	(England) Jordan Stewart	(red card) vs. Walsall	Brentford (H), Crawley Town (A)

=== Monthly and weekly awards ===
Award	Date	Player
League One Team of the Week	28 August 2012	(England) Carl Baker
League One Team of the Week	1 October 2012	(Republic of Ireland) Joe Murphy
League One Team of the Week	1 October 2012	(England) Reece Brown
League One Team of the Week	8 October 2012	(Republic of Ireland) Joe Murphy
League One Team of the Week	16 October 2012	(Republic of Ireland) David McGoldrick
League One Team of the Week	29 October 2012	(Republic of Ireland) Cyrus Christie
League One Team of the Week	29 October 2012	(Republic of Ireland) David McGoldrick
League One Team of the Week	20 November 2012	(England) Carl Baker
League One Team of the Week	10 December 2012	(Republic of Ireland) Cyrus Christie
League One Team of the Week	10 December 2012	(England) Carl Baker
League One Team of the Week	10 December 2012	(Republic of Ireland) David McGoldrick
League One Team of the Week	17 December 2012	(Republic of Ireland) David McGoldrick
League One PFA Fans' Player of the Month (November)	18 December 2012	(Republic of Ireland) David McGoldrick
League One Team of the Week	31 December 2012	(Republic of Ireland) Stephen Elliott
League One Manager of the Month (December)	11 January 2013	(England) Mark Robins
League One Player of the Month (December)	11 January 2013	(Republic of Ireland) David McGoldrick
League One Team of the Week	22 January 2013	(England) James Bailey
League One Team of the Week	22 January 2013	(England) Gary McSheffrey
League One Team of the Week	4 February 2013	(England) Leon Clarke
League One Team of the Week	18 February 2013	(Republic of Ireland) Joe Murphy
League One Team of the Week	18 February 2013	(England) Carl Baker
League One Team of the Week	11 March 2013	(England) Leon Clarke
League One Team of the Week	20 March 2013	(Republic of Ireland) Cyrus Christie
League One Team of the Week	4 April 2013	(Republic of Ireland) Cyrus Christie
League One Team of the Week	8 April 2013	(England) Carl Baker

=== CBS Goal of the Month ===
Award	Date announced	Player
August	12 September 2012	(Scotland) John Fleck vs. Accrington Stanley
September	17 October 2012	(England) Ryan Haynes vs. Sheffield Wednesday U-18's
October	20 November 2012	(Republic of Ireland) David McGoldrick vs. A.F.C. Bournemouth
November	18 December 2012	(England) Carl Baker vs. Hartlepool United
December	11 January 2013	(Belgium) Franck Moussa vs. Milton Keynes Dons
January	19 February 2013	(England) James Bailey vs. Oldham Athletic
February	13 March 2013	(England) Leon Clarke vs. A.F.C. Bournemouth

=== End-of-season awards ===
Award	Winner
Player of the Season Award	(England) Carl Baker
Young Player of the Season Award	(Republic of Ireland) Cyrus Christie
Players' Player of the Season Award	(England) Carl Baker
Top Scorer Award	(England) Carl Baker
Goal of the Season Award	(Belgium) Franck Moussa
Community Player of the Season Award	(France) William Edjenguélé
Coventry Supporters' Club Player of the Season Award	(England) Carl Baker
Irish Supporters' Club Player of the Season Award	(England) Carl Baker
Former Players Association's Player of the Year Award	(England) Carl Baker
London Supporters' Club Player of the Season Award	(England) Carl Baker
South Wales Supporters' Club Player of the Season Award	(England) Carl Baker
Manager's Top 10 Players of the Season	(England) Leon Clarke (3rd)
Manager's Top 10 Players of the Season	(England) Carl Baker (9th)

=== International appearances ===
Date	No.	Pos.	Name	Match	Stats	Caps
2 June 2012	6	DF	(Northern Ireland) James McPake	Netherlands 6 – 0 Northern Ireland	90 Minutes	1
6 September 2012	16	MF	(Republic of Ireland) Adam Barton	Hungary U-21 2 – 1 Republic of Ireland U-21	21 Minutes	5
9 October 2012	30	MF	(Wales) Will Roberts	Sweden U-19 3 – 1 Wales U-19	13 Minutes	1
15 October 2012	30	MF	(Wales) Will Roberts	Russia U-19 2 – 1 Wales U-19	10 Minutes	2
1 November 2012	N/A	DF	(Wales) Cian Harries	Wales U-16 0 – 1 England U-16	90 Minutes	1
5 February 2013	26	DF	(England) Jordan Willis	England U-19 3 – 1 Denmark U-19	11 Minutes	1
11 April 2013	N/A	DF	(Wales) Cian Harries	Wales U-16 2 – 0 Northern Ireland U-16	90 Minutes	2
11 April 2013	N/A	MF	(Wales) George Thomas	Wales U-16 2 – 0 Northern Ireland U-16	30 Minutes	1
12 April 2013	N/A	MF	(Wales) George Thomas	Wales U-16 2 – 0 Faroe Islands U-16	90 Minutes + 1 goal	2
13 April 2013	N/A	MF	(Wales) Cian Harries	Wales U-16 2 – 0 Iceland U-16	90 Minutes	3
13 April 2013	N/A	MF	(Wales) George Thomas	Wales U-16 2 – 0 Iceland U-16	90 Minutes	3

=== Overall ===
Games played	58 (46 League One, 3 League Cup, 3 FA Cup, 6 Football League Trophy)
Games won	27 (18 League One, 2 League Cup, 2 FA Cup, 5 Football League Trophy)
Games drawn	11 (11 League One, 0 League Cup, 0 FA Cup, 0 Football League Trophy)
Games lost	20 (17 League One, 1 League Cup, 1 FA Cup, 1 Football League Trophy)
Goals scored	87 (66 League One, 6 League Cup, 5 FA Cup, 10 Football League Trophy)
Goals conceded	77 (59 League One, 8 League Cup, 4 FA Cup, 6 Football League Trophy)
Goal difference	+10
Yellow cards	83 (74 League One, 3 League Cup, 3 FA Cup, 2 Football League Trophy)
Red cards	1 (1 League One, 0 League Cup, 0 FA Cup, 0 Football League Trophy)
Worst discipline	(England) Carl Baker (7 (yellow card) , 0 (red card) )
	(England) Steve Jennings (7 (yellow card) , 0 (red card) )
	(England) Gary McSheffrey (7 (yellow card) , 0 (red card) )
Best result	W 5–0 (A) v Hartlepool United – Football League One – 17 November 2012
Worst result	L 6–1 (A) v Arsenal – League Cup – 27 September 2012
Most appearances	(Republic of Ireland) Joe Murphy (56 appearances)
Top scorer	(Republic of Ireland) David McGoldrick (18)
Points	55 / 138 (39.86%)

== Transfers ==
=== Transfers in ===
Player	From	Date	Fee
(Republic of Ireland) Stephen Elliott	(Scotland) Heart of Midlothian	2 July 2012	Free
(Scotland) John Fleck	(Scotland) Rangers	4 July 2012	Free
(Republic of Ireland) Kevin Kilbane	(England) Hull City	5 July 2012	Free
(France) Kévin Malaga	(France) Nice	13 July 2012	Free
(France) William Edjenguélé	(Greece) Panetolikos	17 July 2012	Free
(Republic of Ireland) Adam Barton	(England) Preston North End	6 August 2012	Undisclosed
(England) Steve Jennings	(Scotland) Motherwell	16 August 2012	Free
(Belgium) Franck Moussa	(England) Leicester City	21 September 2012	Free
(England) Leon Lobjoit	(England) Milton Keynes Dons	1 November 2012	Free
(England) Leon Clarke	(England) Charlton Athletic	7 January 2013	Free
(England) Blair Adams	(England) Sunderland	17 January 2013	Undisclosed
(England) Danny Philliskirk	(England) Sheffield United	7 February 2013	Free
(England) Jordan Stewart	(England) Notts County	1 March 2013	Free

=== Transfers out ===
Player	To	Date	Fee
(England) Jonson Clarke-Harris	(England) Peterborough United	21 June 2012	Free
(Jamaica) Courtney Richards	(England) Brighton & Hove Albion	1 May 2012	Free
(England) Clive Platt	(England) Northampton Town	25 May 2012	Free
(Northern Ireland) James McPake	(Scotland) Hibernian	30 June 2012	Free
(Northern Ireland) Sammy Clingan	(England) Doncaster Rovers	30 June 2012	Free
(England) Martin Cranie	(England) Barnsley	30 June 2012	Free
(Wales) Freddy Eastwood	(England) Southend United	1 July 2012	Free
(Iceland) Hermann Hreiðarsson	(Iceland) Manager: ÍBV	30 June 2012	Free
(Australia) Danny Ireland	(Australia) Lambton Jaffas	30 June 2012	Free
(England) Gaël Bigirimana	(England) Newcastle United	6 July 2012	£1,000,000
(Republic of Ireland) Richard Keogh	(England) Derby County	19 July 2012	Undisclosed
(Republic of Ireland) Gary Deegan	(Scotland) Hibernian	4 August 2012	Undisclosed
(Republic of Ireland) Kevin Kilbane	Retired	8 December 2012	Free
(England) Chris Hussey	(England) AFC Wimbledon	10 January 2013	Free
(Republic of Ireland) Roy O'Donovan	(England) Northampton Town	31 January 2013	Free
(England) Joe Pegg	Released	22 April 2013	Free
(England) Alex Donald	Released	22 April 2013	Free
(England) Jemal Wiseman	Released	22 April 2013	Free

=== Loans in ===
Player	From	Date from	Date till
(England) Callum Ball	(England) Derby County	19 July 2012	30 June 2013
(England) Reece Brown	(England) Manchester United	20 July 2012	7 January 2013
(England) David McGoldrick	(Republic of Ireland) Nottingham Forest	31 August 2012	2 January 2013
(Republic of Ireland) Conor Henderson	(England) Arsenal	21 September 2012	23 December 2012
(England) Jamie Reckord	(England) Wolverhampton Wanderers	21 September 2012	30 November 2012
(England) James Bailey	(England) Derby County	25 September 2012	27 December 2012
(England) Blair Adams	(England) Sunderland	17 November 2012	16 January 2013
(England) James Bailey	(England) Derby County	31 December 2012	30 June 2013
(England) Leon Clarke	(England) Charlton Athletic	1 January 2013	7 January 2013
(England) Carl Dickinson	(England) Watford	12 February 2013	12 March 2013
(England) Aaron Martin	(England) Southampton	25 February 2013	20 May 2013

=== Loans out ===
Player	To	Date from	Date till
(England) Shaun Jeffers	(England) Tamworth	31 August 2012	28 September 2012
(France) Kévin Malaga	(England) Nuneaton Town	31 October 2012	28 November 2012
(England) Joe Henderson	(England) Bedworth United	1 January 2013	29 January 2013
(England) Jordan Willis	(England) Nuneaton Town	2 January 2013	3 January 2013 – rejected
(England) Cody McDonald	(England) Gillingham	25 January 2013	25 February 2013
(England) Lee Burge	(England) Nuneaton Town	30 January 2013	20 April 2013
(England) Aaron Phillips	(England) Nuneaton Town	31 January 2013	20 April 2013
(England) Nathan Cameron	(England) Northampton Town	26 March 2013	30 June 2013

=== Trials ===
Player	From	Trial date	Signed
(Republic of Ireland) Kevin Kilbane	(England) Hull City	July 2012	✓
(England) Steve Jennings	(Scotland) Motherwell	July 2012	✓
(France) Kévin Malaga	(France) Nice	July 2012	✓
(France) William Edjenguélé	(Greece) Panetolikos	July 2012	✓
(Brazil) Bruno Cazarine	(Australia) Sydney	July 2012	✗
(Germany) Ndriqim Halilli	(Germany) VfB Stuttgart II	July 2012	✗
(Hungary) Péter Pölöskey	(Hungary) Ferencvárosi	August 2012	✗
(England) Leon Lobjoit	(England) Milton Keynes Dons	October 2012	✓
(Scotland) Stephen McGinn	(England) Watford	October 2012	✗
(England) Leon Clarke	(England) Charlton Athletic	December 2012	✓
(England) Danny Philliskirk	(England) Sheffield United	January 2013	✓
