= Jordan Stewart (footballer, born 1982) =

English footballer (born 1982)

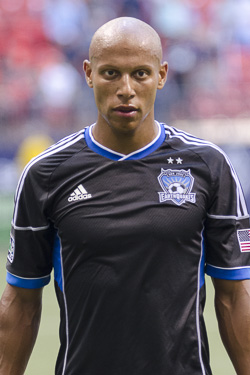
- Stewart with San Jose Earthquakes in 2013

Personal information
- Full name: Jordan Barrington Stewart
- Date of birth: 3 March 1982 (age 44)
- Place of birth: Birmingham, England
- Height: 6 ft 0 in (1.83 m)
- Positions: Left-back; left winger

Senior career*
Years	Team	Apps	(Gls)
1999–2005	Leicester City	110	(6)
2000	→ Bristol Rovers (loan)	4	(0)
2005–2008	Watford	105	(2)
2008–2009	Derby County	26	(2)
2009–2010	Sheffield United	23	(0)
2010–2011	Skoda Xanthi	14	(1)
2011–2012	Millwall	4	(0)
2012–2013	Notts County	10	(0)
2013	Coventry City	6	(0)
2013–2016	San Jose Earthquakes	71	(0)
2017	Phoenix Rising	23	(0)
Total		397	(11)

International career
2001	England U18	4	(0)
2003	England U21	1	(0)
- * Club domestic league appearances and goals

Jordan Barrington Stewart (born 3 March 1982) is an English professional football manager and former footballer who played as a left-back or left winger.

Stewart started his career at Leicester City, where he was relegated twice and once promoted to the Premier League. Whilst at Leicester he also spent a loan spell at Bristol Rovers. He joined Watford in 2005, and was part of a side that won promotion to Premier League, before being subsequently relegated. He left the club in 2008 and subsequently signed for Derby. In March 2013 he signed a three-month contract with Coventry City on a free transfer. He subsequently spent four seasons in the Major League Soccer with San Jose Earthquakes and one season in the USL Championship with Phoenix Rising. He took on his first head coaching role in 2024 with USL Championship side Monterey Bay FC.

== Club career ==
=== Leicester City ===
Stewart started his career at Leicester City, signing professional terms in the summer of 1999. He made his debut for the club against West Ham United on 22 January 2000. He made one more appearance for Leicester that season before being loaned to Division Two side Bristol Rovers, for whom he made four appearances. Semi-regular appearances from the bench followed in the 2001–02 season, before he established himself as a member of the first team in 2002–03, after the club's relegation to Division One.

On 4 August 2002, Stewart scored Leicester's first goal at the new Walkers Stadium in a friendly match with Athletic Bilbao. Leicester's return to the Premiership in 2003–04 saw fewer games for Stewart, although he did score a memorable goal against Manchester City at the City of Manchester Stadium in Leicester's 3–0 win in November 2003. Relegation again saw Stewart hold down a starting position in 2004–05.

=== Watford ===
Stewart became Aidy Boothroyd's first signing for Watford, joining for £125,000 in July 2005. He started as Watford's first-choice left-back, but was dropped in October 2005 after a run of poor form. He retook the position from James Chambers in January, and started every game until he was dropped for the game against Wolverhampton Wanderers on 14 April 2006, after another run of poor form. However, he returned to the side as they went on to win the Championship play-offs, playing all three games. He was the only player in Watford's squad to appear in every single match in 2005–06.

Stewart was a first-team regular through the club's 2006–07 Premiership campaign. Pre-season press speculation linked Stewart with a move to Rangers, but no move came to fruition.

Watford were relegated, and started their 2007–08 Championship season away at Wolverhampton Wanderers. Stewart scored his first goal for the club, a deflected free-kick, to equalise in an eventual 2–1 win. Up to the end of 2007, he started every league game in the campaign. He scored his second goal for the club on his 26th birthday, in a 2–2 draw away at Burnley. On 7 May 2008, Watford announced ahead of their play-off game with Hull City that they had agreed to release Stewart early from his contract.

=== Derby County ===
On 30 May 2008, Stewart, along with former Watford teammate Nathan Ellington, signed for Derby County. He signed a three-year contract with the club, who had just been relegated from the Premier League.

Stewart started the 2008–09 season as second choice left back, behind Jay McEveley, but soon established himself as first choice. With McEveley joining Preston and Charlton on loan, he became an ever-present in the Derby side. Stewart scored his first goal for Derby in the 3–0 win over Sheffield Wednesday, a stunning 30-yard strike. In his next home game, he scored another spectacular goal, this one coming against Preston. Once McEveley had returned from his loan spells at the end of January, he re-established himself as first choice left back and after Derby's FA Cup defeat to Manchester United, Stewart only played one more game for the first team, against Charlton on 25 April. Even with McEveley suffering an injury that ruled him out for the season in early April, Stewart was unable to re-establish himself as Lewin Nyatanga was preferred at left back.

=== Sheffield United ===
On the final day of the 2009 Summer transfer window, Stewart held talks with Sheffield United over a possible move to the Bramall Lane club. The deal was finalised later the same day, with Lee Hendrie moving in the opposite direction. Stewart made his début for the Blades a few days later in a 1–1 home draw against local rivals Doncaster Rovers. Stewart was largely used as a substitute or as defensive cover for the remainder of the season, playing twenty three times for the Blades.

=== Skoda Xanthi ===
Failing to hold down a first team place at Sheffield United he was released from his contract and signed for Super League Greece side Skoda Xanthi in June 2010. Where he joined former teammate Nathan Ellington.

=== Millwall ===
Stewart signed a one-year deal with Football League Championship side Millwall on 7 July 2011, after a week-long trial with the club, stating his wish to return from Greece to an English team.

=== Notts County ===
Stewart signed a short-term deal with Football League One side Notts County on 6 October 2012, and played later that day against table toppers Tranmere Rovers. He scored his first and only goal for the club in a Football League Trophy tie against former club Sheffield United.

=== Coventry City ===
In March 2013 Stewart signed a three-month contract with Football League One side Coventry City. Coventry manager Steven Pressley announced on 30 April 2013 that Stewart's contract would not be renewed. In total, Stewart made six appearances for the club.

=== San Jose Earthquakes ===
In July 2013, Stewart signed with Major League Soccer club San Jose Earthquakes.

=== Phoenix Rising ===
Stewart moved to USL Championship side Phoenix Rising FC in February 2017.

== Management career ==
After serving as assistant coach for San Jose Earthquakes reserve side The Town FC for two seasons, Stewart was appointed as head coach of USL Championship side Monterey Bay FC in August 2024. He replaced former San Jose Earthquakes coach Frank Yallop. Simon Dawkins, a former teammate of Stewart's at San Jose, took on the assistant coach role for the remainder of 2024 and replaced Ramiro Corrales, another former teammate of Stewart. Stewart was dismissed as head coach of Monterey Bay on 29 April 2026.

== Personal life ==
Stewart and his close friend and fellow footballer Joleon Lescott launched a clothing label together in 2012 named LescottStewart.

== Career statistics ==
Appearances and goals by club, season and competition
Club	Season	League			FA Cup		League Cup		Other		Total	
Club	Season	Division	Apps	Goals	Apps	Goals	Apps	Goals	Apps	Goals	Apps	Goals
Leicester City	1999–2000	Premier League	1	0	1	0	0	0	0	0	2	0
Leicester City	2000–01	Premier League	0	0	0	0	0	0	0	0	0	0
Leicester City	2001–02	Premier League	12	0	2	0	1	0	0	0	15	0
Leicester City	2002–03	First Division	37	4	2	0	2	0	0	0	41	4
Leicester City	2003–04	Premier League	25	1	2	0	2	0	0	0	29	1
Leicester City	2004–05	Championship	35	1	4	0	1	0	0	0	40	1
Leicester City	Total		110	6	11	0	6	0	0	0	127	6
Bristol Rovers (loan)	2000–01	Second Division	4	0	0	0	0	0	0	0	4	0
Watford	2005–06	Championship	35	0	1	0	2	0	3 (Note: Appearances in the 2005–06 Play-offs)	0	41	0
Watford	2006–07	Premier League	31	0	3	0	2	0	0	0	36	0
Watford	2007–08	Championship	39	2	1	0	0	0	0	0	40	2
Watford	Total		105	2	5	0	4	0	3	0	117	2
Derby County	2008–09	Championship	26	2	2	0	5	0	0	0	33	2
Sheffield United	2009–10	Championship	23	0	0	0	0	0	0	0	23	0
Skoda Xanthi	2010–11	Super League Greece	14	1	1	0	0	0	0	0	15	1
Millwall	2011–12	Championship	4	0	0	0	3	0	0	0	7	0
Notts County	2012–13	League One	10	0	2	0	0	0	1 (Note: Appearance in the Football League Trophy)	1	13	1
Coventry City	2012–13	League One	6	0	0	0	0	0	0	0	6	0
San Jose Earthquakes reserves	2013	USL Championship	1	0	0	0	0	0	0	0	1	0
San Jose Earthquakes	2013	MLS	12	0	0	0	0	0	1 (Note: Appearances in the CONCACAF Champions League)	0	13	0
San Jose Earthquakes	2014	MLS	30	0	0	0	0	0	1	0	31	0
San Jose Earthquakes	2015	MLS	14	0	0	0	0	0	0	0	14	0
San Jose Earthquakes	2016	MLS	15	0	1	0	0	0	0	0	16	0
San Jose Earthquakes	Total		71	0	1	0	0	0	2	0	74	0
Phoenix Rising	2017	USL Championship	23	0	0	0	0	0	0	0	23	0
Career total			397	11	22	0	18	0	6	1	443	12

== Honours ==
Watford

- Football League Championship play-offs: 2006
