= William Edjenguélé =

French footballer (born 1987)

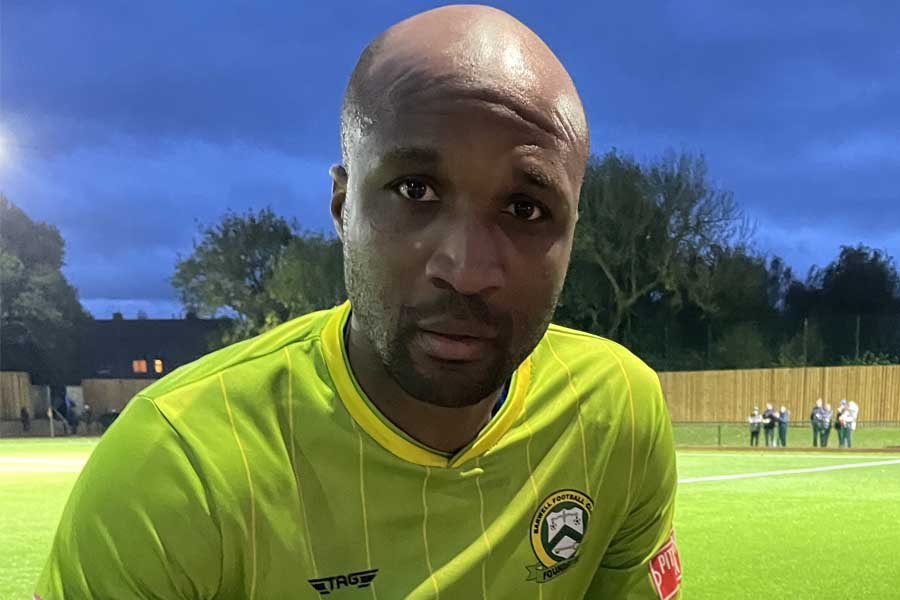
- Edjenguélé in November 2021

Personal information
- Full name: William Emery Edjenguélé
- Date of birth: 7 May 1987 (age 39)
- Place of birth: Paris, France
- Height: 1.88 m (6 ft 2 in)
- Position: Centre-back

Team information
- Current team: Bedworth United

Youth career
- 1993–2005: CFF Paris

Senior career*
Years	Team	Apps	(Gls)
2005–2008	Le Mans UC 72 B	58	(1)
2008–2010	Neuchâtel Xamax	39	(1)
2010–2012	Panetolikos	46	(3)
2012–2013	Coventry City	33	(1)
2013–2014	Bury	19	(2)
2014–2015	Panetolikos	22	(1)
2015–2016	Veria	12	(0)
2016–2019	Dundee United	37	(2)
2019	→ Falkirk (loan)	8	(1)
2019–2020	Wealdstone	8	(0)
2020–2021	Nuneaton Borough	8	(1)
2021–2022	Barwell	30	(0)
2022–2023	Bedworth United	25	(1)
2023–2024	Coventry Sphinx	26	(0)
2024–	Bedworth United	1	(0)
- * Club domestic league appearances and goals as of 13:44, 28 August 2024 (UTC)

William Emery Edjenguélé (born 7 May 1987) is a French footballer who plays for Northern Premier League Division One Midlands side Bedworth United, where he plays as a centre-back.

== Career ==
Born in Paris, Edjenguélé began his career 1993 with CFF Paris and joined 2005 in the reserve team of Le Mans Union Club 72. After three years with Le Mans UC 72 B who scored one goal in 58 appearances joined on 18 July 2008 to Neuchâtel Xamax. On 27 April 2010 his club confirmed his contract will not renewed and he left the club.

On 30 July 2010, he signed with Panetolikos He was an integral part of the squad that became 2010–11 Football League champions and led Panetolikos to the Super League Greece. However, he could not help Panetolikos avoid relegation after the end of the 2011–12 Super League Greece . Panetolikos and Edjenguélé parted ways on 2 May 2012.

At the start of the 2012–13 season, Edjenguélé joined Coventry City on trial and started in the 8–0 victory over Hinckley United on 14 July 2012. He later signed for the club on 17 July on a three-year contract. Edjenguélé scored his first goal, with a header, in a 3–1 win over Colchester United.

On 20 August 2013, Edjenguélé had his contract at Coventry City terminated by mutual consent. He had made a big impression in his one season with the club, playing 40 games after joining on a free transfer from Greek side Panetolikos. But he was one of several players made available for transfer in the summer as they battled financial problems. On the same day it was reported that he had signed for Bury.

On 29 January 2014, Edjenguélé cancelled his contract at Bury on mutual terms. He made 23 appearances for Football League Two side Bury after joining on a free transfer from the Sky Blues. William Edjenguele then re-signed for his former club Panetolikos in Super League. The 26-year-old returned on a one-year contract to the Greek team where he previously played for two seasons before he moved to the Ricoh Arena in 2012. This was a successful season finishing one place off the playoffs which is the highest position in the club's history.

In June 2015, after a successful season, Edjenguélé earned a two-year contract with the Greek Super League club Veria.

He signed a one-year contract with Scottish Championship club Dundee United in August 2016. During his third season with United, Edjenguélé moved on loan to Falkirk in January 2019.

In November 2019 Edjenguélé joined Wealdstone of the National League South division in England. In June 2020 he left Wealdstone to join Southern League club Nuneaton Borough.

Edjenguélé signed for Southern League Premier Central rivals Barwell on 24 September 2021. Edjenguélé made his debut the following day in an away Southern League Premier Central fixture against Rushall Olympic, he played the full match in a 2–0 defeat.

On 7 June 2022, William signed for Northern Premier League Division One Midlands side Bedworth United.

In September 2023, Edjenguélé signed for newly promoted Northern Premier League Division One Midlands club Coventry Sphinx. Following the conclusion of the 2023–24 season, he announced his retirement from football.

== Personal life ==
Edjenguélé is married to the daughter of former Coventry City goalkeeper Steve Ogrizovic. He is a user of Twitter, so he can be closer to the fans by running regular competitions for his worn match-shirts and sharing his thoughts on his performances.

== Career statistics ==
As of end of 2023–24 season

Appearances and goals by club, season and competition
Club	Season	League			National Cup		League Cup		Other		Total	
Club	Season	Division	Apps	Goals	Apps	Goals	Apps	Goals	Apps	Goals	Apps	Goals
Le Mans B	2005–08	CFA	58	1	—		—		—		58	1
Le Mans B	Total		58	1	—		—		—		58	1
Neuchâtel Xamax	2008–09	Swiss Super League	24	0	0	0	—		0	0	24	0
Neuchâtel Xamax	2009–10	Swiss Super League	15	1	0	0	—		0	0	15	1
Neuchâtel Xamax	Total		39	1	0	0	—		0	0	39	1
Panetolikos	2010–11	Greek Football League	27	1	0	0	—		0	0	27	1
Panetolikos	2011–12	Super League Greece	19	2	1	0	—		0	0	20	2
Panetolikos	Total		46	3	1	0	0	0	0	0	47	3
Coventry City	2012–13	League One	33	1	3	0	1	0	3 (Note: Appearances in the Football League Trophy)	0	40	1
Coventry City	Total		33	1	3	0	1	0	3	0	40	1
Bury	2013–14	League Two	19	2	2	0	1	1	1	0	23	3
Bury	Total		19	2	2	0	1	1	1	0	23	3
Panetolikos	2014–15	Super League Greece	21	1	3	0	—		0	0	24	1
Panetolikos	Total		21	1	3	0	—		0	0	24	1
Veria	2015–16	Super League Greece	12	0	2	0	—		0	0	14	0
Veria	Total		12	0	2	0	—		0	0	14	0
Dundee United	2016–17	Championship	29	2	1	0	1	0	10 (Note: Four appearances in the Scottish Challenge Cup and six in the Premiership play-offs)	0	41	2
Dundee United	2017–18	Championship	8	0	0	0	5	0	1 (Note: Appearance in the Scottish Challenge Cup)	0	14	0
Dundee United	Total		37	2	1	0	6	0	11	0	55	2
Barwell	2021–22	Southern League Premier Division Central	30	0	0	0	—		1 (Note: Appearance(s) in FA Trophy)	0	31	0
Bedworth United	2022–23	Northern Premier League Division One Midlands	23	1	3	1	—		1	0	27	2
Bedworth United	2023–24	Northern Premier League Division One Midlands	2	0	0	0	—		0	0	2	0
Bedworth United	Total		25	1	3	1	0	0	1	0	29	2
Coventry Sphinx	2023–24	Northern Premier League Division One Midlands	26	0	0	0	—		1	0	27	0
Career totals			346	12	15	1	8	1	18	0	387	14

== Honours ==
Panetolikos

- Greek Second Division: 2010–11

Dundee United

- Scottish Challenge Cup: 2016–17
