= Joe Murphy (footballer, born 1981) =

Irish footballer

Personal information
- Full name: Joseph Murphy
- Date of birth: 21 August 1981 (age 45)
- Place of birth: Dublin, Ireland
- Height: 6 ft 2 in (1.88 m)
- Position: Goalkeeper

Senior career*
Years	Team	Apps	(Gls)
1998–2002	Tranmere Rovers	63	(0)
2002–2005	West Bromwich Albion	6	(0)
2004–2005	→ Walsall (loan)	25	(0)
2005–2006	Sunderland	0	(0)
2005–2006	→ Walsall (loan)	14	(0)
2006–2011	Scunthorpe United	201	(0)
2011–2014	Coventry City	137	(0)
2014–2017	Huddersfield Town	9	(0)
2015	→ Chesterfield (loan)	0	(0)
2017	→ Bury (loan)	16	(0)
2017–2019	Bury	63	(0)
2019–2020	Shrewsbury Town	4	(0)
2020–2026	Tranmere Rovers	61	(0)
Total		600	(0)

International career
2000–2002	Republic of Ireland U21	10	(0)
2003–2010	Republic of Ireland	2	(0)
Medal record
Men's football
Representing Republic of Ireland
UEFA Euro U-16
Winner	1998 Scotland
- * Club domestic league appearances and goals as of 16:56, 4 May 2026 (UTC)

Joseph Murphy (born 21 August 1981) is an Irish former professional footballer.

Murphy began his career with Tranmere Rovers, and has since represented eight other clubs, making over 600 appearances in the Football League and playing twice in the Premier League for West Bromwich Albion in 2002.

Born in Dublin, he was capped twice by the Republic of Ireland at international level in 2003 and 2010.

== Club career ==
=== Early career ===
With his first club, Tranmere Rovers, Murphy played in the 2000 Football League Cup final against Leicester City, before joining West Bromwich Albion in July 2002. With his first touches in a Premier League game, Murphy saved a Michael Owen penalty following the sending off of Russell Hoult. He spent the majority of the 2004–05 season on loan at Walsall. In August 2005, he moved from West Brom to Sunderland, but was again loaned to Walsall during 2005–06.

=== Scunthorpe United ===
Murphy signed for Scunthorpe United in May 2006 after being released by Sunderland. He had an excellent 2006–07 season, and was an integral part of the team that led Scunthorpe to the League One trophy. He was in the League One team of the season, and also won the golden glove (award for most clean sheets). He was also named League One player of the month for February 2007. On top of this, he hit the crossbar during Soccer AM's crossbar challenge. His clean sheet in Scunthorpe's 2–0 home victory over Burnley on 30 September 2007 earned him a place in the Championship Team of the Week. He made the Team of the Week once more following his side's 1–0 victory over Charlton Athletic in February.

Murphy enjoyed a good set of performances during the 2008–09 season but never caught the eye of Republic of Ireland manager Giovanni Trapattoni due to playing in the third tier. Murphy's performance in the League One play-off semi-final second leg against MK Dons helped the team proceed to the final as he kept a clean sheet in 120 minutes and saved two penalties in the shootout from Jason Puncheon and Jude Stirling. Scunthorpe won the play-off final against Millwall.

Murphy's contract was to end at the end of the 2008–09 season and there was much speculation as to where his future lay; many reports suggested that he would be moving to a much bigger club to gain international football for Ireland. This speculation was ended when he signed a one-year contract extension with Scunthorpe, extendable to 2011 if the Iron remained in the Championship. He told local newspapers that he signed the new deal because "He owed the club for all it has done for him". He was selected as a member of the League One team of the year for 2008–09.

Murphy was one of seven players to be released by Scunthorpe in May 2011. He was not offered a new contract because of cost-cutting measures implemented after the team was relegated.

=== Coventry City ===
On 30 June 2011, Murphy joined Championship club Coventry City on a three-year deal.

=== Huddersfield Town ===
Murphy signed for Championship side Huddersfield Town on a two-year contract, with the option of a further year in the club's favour, on 17 June 2014. Although expected to start as 2nd choice, he aimed to challenge Alex Smithies for the goalkeeper spot. After making his début in the League Cup first round match against Chesterfield in August, he would make his league début against Sheffield Wednesday on 22 November 2014.

==== Chesterfield (loan) ====
On 9 May 2015, Murphy was sent on a week-long emergency loan to Chesterfield for their play-off campaign, following an injury to Tommy Lee. Unfortunately, he couldn't help the Spireites get to Wembley, as they lost in the two-legged semi-final to Preston North End.

=== Bury ===
On 30 January 2017, Murphy signed a loan deal with Football League One side Bury to the end of the 2016–17 season, making sixteen first team appearances. He left Huddersfield on 1 July 2017 to sign a full contract with Bury and made eighteen first team appearances in 2017–18. Bury were relegated to League Two in May 2018 but Murphy's contract was extended by one year and he has played in every Bury match of the 2018–19 season to date.

=== Shrewsbury Town ===
On 4 July 2019, Murphy signed for League One side Shrewsbury Town on a free transfer, signing a one-year deal, becoming the club's seventh summer signing.

At the end of the season, Murphy was not offered a contract extension and was released by the club on 11 June 2020.

=== Tranmere Rovers ===
On 22 August 2020, Murphy signed a one-year deal to rejoin Tranmere Rovers. Having made 21 appearances the previous season, this was extended by a further year on 10 June 2021. On 26 May 2022, Murphy extended his stay for a further 12 months, taking on the additional role of goalkeeping coach while remaining on the playing staff. At the age of 41 years and 187 days, Murphy became the oldest player to represent Tranmere Rovers, keeping a clean sheet against promotion-chasing Stevenage in a 1–0 away win on 25 February 2023.

On 26 June 2023, Murphy signed a 4th consecutive 12-month contract, continuing his role of goalkeeping coach while remaining on the playing staff supporting new #1 Luke McGee as coach and understudy. On 29 August 2023, he started in the EFL Cup against Championship leaders Leicester City, 23 years after playing in goal for Rovers against Leicester in the 2000 final. In April 2024, he signed a new one-year deal as player-coach.

On 16 May 2025, Murphy signed another contract with Tranmere Rovers as player and goalkeeper coach for the 2025/2026 season, extending his second spell at Prenton Park. This ensured that he remained part of recently appointed manager Andy Crosby's backroom staff whilst also providing cover to Luke McGee. With McGee being ruled out for "months" with a hip injury, Murphy played in the League Two match against Salford City on 6 September 2025, becoming, aged 44, the oldest player to start a match at this level since Kevin Poole played for Burton Albion in May 2010 at the age of 46.

On 4 May 2026, Murphy announced his retirement from football.

== International career ==
Murphy is a former member of the Republic of Ireland national under-21 team and has been capped twice at senior level for the Republic. His first senior international appearance came in a 2–2 draw in a friendly at Landsdowne Road on 9 September 2003 against Turkey having come on as a 76th-minute substitute for Nick Colgan. His second, and final appearance came over 7 years later in 2010 as he appeared as an 86th-minute substitute for Kieren Westwood in a 3-0 friendly win over Algeria at the Royal Dublin Society Showgrounds on 28 May 2010.

== Career statistics ==
=== Club ===
As of end of 2025–26 season

Appearances and goals by club, season and competition
Club	Season	League			FA Cup		League Cup		Other		Total	
Club	Season	Division	Apps	Goals	Apps	Goals	Apps	Goals	Apps	Goals	Apps	Goals
Tranmere Rovers	1998–99	First Division	0	0	0	0	0	0	—		0	0
Tranmere Rovers	1999–2000	First Division	21	0	2	0	4	0	—		27	0
Tranmere Rovers	2000–01	First Division	20	0	0	0	1	0	—		21	0
Tranmere Rovers	2001–02	Second Division	22	0	1	0	3	0	1 (Note: Appearance(s) in the Football League Trophy.)	0	27	0
West Bromwich Albion	2002–03	Premier League	2	0	0	0	1	0	—		3	0
West Bromwich Albion	2003–04	First Division	4	0	0	0	0	0	—		4	0
West Bromwich Albion	2004–05	First Division	0	0	0	0	0	0	—		0	0
Walsall (loan)	2004–05	League One	25	0	0	0	0	0	2	0	27	0
Sunderland	2005–06	Premier League	0	0	0	0	0	0	—		0	0
Walsall (loan)	2005–06	League One	14	0	0	0	0	0	2	0	16	0
Scunthorpe United	2006–07	League One	45	0	3	0	2	0	2	0	52	0
Scunthorpe United	2007–08	Championship	45	0	1	0	0	0	—		46	0
Scunthorpe United	2008–09	League One	44	0	3	0	0	0	6 (Note: Five appearances in EFL Trophy; one in EFL League One play-offs.)	0	53	0
Scunthorpe United	2009–10	Championship	40	0	1	0	3	0	—		44	0
Scunthorpe United	2010–11	Championship	29	0	1	0	2	0	—		32	0
Coventry City	2011–12	Championship	46	0	0	0	1	0	—		47	0
Coventry City	2012–13	League One	45	0	2	0	3	0	6	0	56	0
Coventry City	2013–14	League One	46	0	5	0	1	0	1	0	53	0
Chesterfield (loan)	2014–15	League One	0	0	0	0	0	0	1 (Note: Appearance(s) in the EFL League One play-offs.)	0	1	0
Huddersfield Town	2014–15	Championship	2	0	0	0	2	0	—		4	0
Huddersfield Town	2015–16	Championship	7	0	2	0	1	0	—		10	0
Bury (loan)	2016–17	League One	16	0	0	0	0	0	0	0	16	0
Bury	2017–18	League One	17	0	0	0	1	0	0	0	18	0
Bury	2018–19	League Two	46	0	2	0	1	0	3	0	52	0
Shrewsbury Town	2019–20	League One	4	0	4	0	1	0	3	0	12	0
Tranmere Rovers	2020–21	League Two	13	0	0	0	0	0	8	0	9	0
Tranmere Rovers	2021–22	League Two	17	0	0	0	0	0	3	0	20	0
Tranmere Rovers	2022–23	League Two	7	0	0	0	0	0	0	0	7	0
Tranmere Rovers	2023–24	League Two	2	0	0	0	2	0	2	0	6	0
Tranmere Rovers	2024–25	League Two	0	0	0	0	2	0	4	0	6	0
Tranmere Rovers	2025–26	League Two	22	0	0	0	0	0	0	0	22	0
Career totals			600	0	27	0	31	0	44	0	702	0

=== International ===
As of match played 28 May 2010

International statistics
National team	Year	Apps	Goals
Republic of Ireland	2003	1	0
Republic of Ireland	2010	1	0
Total		2	0

== Honours ==
Tranmere Rovers

- Football League Cup runner-up: 1999–2000
- EFL Trophy runner-up: 2020–21

Scunthorpe United

- Football League One: 2006–07; play-offs: 2009
- Football League Trophy runner-up: 2008–09

Bury

- EFL League Two runner-up: 2018–19

Republic of Ireland U16

- UEFA European Under-16 Championship: 1998

Individual

- PFA Team of the Year: 2006–07 League One, 2008–09 League One, 2018–19 League Two
- FAI Under-21 Footballer of The Year: 2002
- Football League One Golden Glove: 2006–07
