= Kévin Malaga =

French footballer (born 1987)

Personal information
- Full name: Kévin Marc-François Malaga
- Date of birth: 24 June 1987 (age 39)
- Place of birth: Toulon, France
- Height: 1.89 m (6 ft 2 in)
- Position: Centre-back

Youth career
- –2007: SC Toulon
- 2007–2010: Auxerre

Senior career*
Years	Team	Apps	(Gls)
2008–2010	Auxerre B	50	(1)
2010	Auxerre	1	(0)
2011–2012	Nice B	19	(2)
2011–2012	Nice	2	(0)
2012–2013	Coventry City	2	(0)
2012	→ Nuneaton Town (loan)	3	(0)
2014–2016	Le Las	41	(3)
2016–2018	Pau	57	(0)
2017	Pau B	1	(0)
2018–2020	Cholet	38	(1)
2020–2022	C'Chartres	32	(5)
- * Club domestic league appearances and goals as of 19:47, 9 November 2022 (UTC)

Kévin Marc-François Malaga (born 24 June 1987) is a French footballer who plays as a centre-back.

== Club career ==
=== Auxerre ===
Born in Toulon, Malaga started his senior career playing for AJ Auxerre's B team in 2008, having previously played for the team's youth squads, and SC Toulon. He made a single league appearance for the full AJ Auxerre squad in 2010.

=== Nice ===
In 2011 Malaga switched to OGC Nice where he played twice for the senior squad and was captain of the reserve team.

=== Coventry City ===
On 13 July 2012, Malaga joined Football League One side Coventry City on a free transfer after his Nice contract had expired, having agreed a three-year deal. Unable to fully break into the Coventry team, he had a brief loan spell at Nuneaton Town. His contract with Coventry City was terminated by mutual consent on 2 September 2013.

== Career statistics ==
As of match played 24 May 2020

Appearances and goals by club, season and competition
Club	Season	League			National Cup		League Cup		Other		Total	
Club	Season	Division	Apps	Goals	Apps	Goals	Apps	Goals	Apps	Goals	Apps	Goals
Auxerre B	2008–09	CFA	22	0	—		—		—		22	0
Auxerre B	2009–10	CFA	28	1	—		—		—		28	1
Auxerre B	Total		50	1	—		—		0	0	50	1
Auxerre	2009–10	Ligue 1	1	0	2	0	0	0	—		3	0
Nice B	2010–11	CFA 2	11	2	—		—		—		11	2
Nice B	2011–12	CFA 2	8	0	—		—		—		8	0
Nice B	Total		19	2	—		—		0	0	19	2
Nice	2010–11	Ligue 1	1	0	0	0	0	0	—		1	0
Nice	2011–12	Ligue 1	1	0	0	0	0	0	—		1	0
Nice	Total		2	0	0	0	0	0	0	0	2	0
Coventry City	2012–13	League One	2	0	0	0	0	0	0	0	2	0
Nuneaton Town (loan)	2012–13	Conference Premier	3	0	2	0	—		1 (Note: Appearance in the FA Trophy)	0	6	0
Toulon Le Las	2014–15	CFA 2	18	1	0	0	—		—		18	1
Toulon Le Las	2015–16	CFA	23	2	0	0	—		—		23	2
Toulon Le Las	Total		41	3	0	0	0	0	0	0	41	3
Pau II	2016–17	CFA 2	1	0	—		—		—		1	0
Pau	2016–17	Championnat National	29	0	0	0	—		—		29	0
Pau	2017–18	Championnat National	28	0	0	0	—		—		28	0
Pau	Total		57	0	0	0	0	0	0	0	57	0
Cholet	2018–19	Championnat National	31	1	1	1	—		—		32	2
Cholet	2018–19	Championnat National	7	0	0	0	—		—		7	0
Cholet	Total		38	1	1	1	0	0	0	0	39	2
Career total			214	7	5	1	0	0	1	0	220	8
