= Reece Brown (footballer, born 1991) =

English footballer

Personal information
- Full name: Reece Brown
- Date of birth: 1 November 1991 (age 35)
- Place of birth: Manchester, England
- Height: 6 ft 2 in (1.88 m)
- Position: Defender

Youth career
- Fletcher Moss Rangers
- 2000–2009: Manchester United

Senior career*
Years	Team	Apps	(Gls)
2009–2013	Manchester United	0	(0)
2010	→ Bradford City (loan)	3	(0)
2011	→ Doncaster Rovers (loan)	3	(0)
2012	→ Oldham Athletic (loan)	15	(0)
2012–2013	→ Coventry City (loan)	6	(0)
2013	→ Ipswich Town (loan)	1	(0)
2013–2014	Watford	1	(0)
2014	→ Carlisle United (loan)	12	(0)
2014–2015	Barnsley	13	(0)
2015–2016	Bury	28	(0)
2016–2017	Sheffield United	2	(0)
2017	Bury	7	(1)
2017–2018	Rochdale	3	(0)

International career^{‡}
2009–2010	England U19	10	(1)
2011	England U20	5	(0)
- * Club domestic league appearances and goals as of 02:00, 24 September 2017 (UTC) ‡ National team caps and goals as of 01:01, 11 August 2011 (UTC)

Reece Brown (born 1 November 1991) is an English former professional footballer who played as a defender. He began his career with Manchester United, but failed to break into the first team and after loan spells at Bradford City, Doncaster Rovers, Oldham Athletic, Coventry City and Ipswich Town, he joined Watford in 2013. At the end of the 2013–14 season, he spent a month on loan to Carlisle United, before leaving Watford for Barnsley on a free transfer ahead of the 2014–15 season. He lasted just a season there before joining Bury. He joined Sheffield United for the 2016–17 season, but was released in January 2017 and returned to Bury. At the end of the season, he joined Rochdale, but his time there lasted just one season. His elder brother, Wes, also played for Manchester United from 1998 to 2011.

== Career ==
Brown joined Manchester United at the age of nine, having previously played for Fletcher Moss Rangers. After making his way through United's youth teams he was awarded his first professional contract by the club in the summer of 2009.

On 29 September 2010, he joined Bradford City on a month's loan along with fellow Manchester United defender Oliver Gill. Brown, like Gill, made his debut on 2 October 2010 in a 0–1 defeat to Morecambe. On 25 October 2010, the pair returned to Manchester United after the expiration of their month's loan despite Bradford's willingness to extend their stay.

On 16 August 2011, he joined Doncaster Rovers on a month's loan. He made his debut on the same day, coming on as an 85th-minute substitute for Kyle Bennett in Doncaster's 1–0 home defeat by Nottingham Forest.

Brown returned from his loan spell at Doncaster on 10 September 2011 and after a couple of impressive displays in the reserves, he was included in the first-team squad for the League Cup third round tie against Leeds United, however he was an unused substitute on the night.

On 2 March 2012, Manchester United agreed for Brown to spend a one-month loan spell at Oldham Athletic. On 3 April 2012, Brown extended his loan deal with the club until the end of the season. On 20 July 2012, he went out on loan again, this time to Coventry City for the duration of the 2012–13 season. He made his debut on 11 August in the League Cup in a 1–0 win away to Dagenham & Redbridge. He made his league debut in a 1–1 draw away to Yeovil Town on 18 August. On 21 August 2012, he made his home debut in a 1–1 draw to Sheffield United. Although the loan was intended to last the entire season, Manchester United recalled Brown in January 2013 after he fell down the pecking order at Coventry; his last appearance came in the league against Oldham Athletic in September 2012.

On 25 February 2013, Manchester United agreed for Brown to spend the rest of the season on loan to Ipswich Town. At the end of the 2012–13 season, he was released by Manchester United.

Brown completed a move to Watford, signing a two-year deal on 22 July 2013. He made his league debut as a substitute away to Reading on 17 August 2013.

On 11 March 2014, Brown joined League One side Carlisle United on a one-month loan until 12 April 2014. On 15 April 2014, Brown extended his loan stay with the Cumbrians until the end of the 2013–14 season.

Despite still being contracted to Watford, Brown went on trial at League One side Barnsley in July 2014 playing in some of their pre-season fixtures. On 31 July 2014, Brown signed for Barnsley from Watford for an undisclosed fee on a one-year deal with the option of a second.

After a spell with Bury, he linked up with Sheffield United in September 2016 following a successful trial. However, after making just two league appearances in 2016–17 for Sheffield United he departed the club in January 2017 to rejoin former club Bury.

On 25 May 2017, Rochdale announced that Brown had signed a one-year deal with the club.

He was released by Rochdale at the end of the 2017–18 season.

== Career statistics ==
=== Club ===
As of match played 2 September 2017

Appearances and goals by club, season and competition
Club	Season	League			FA Cup		League Cup		Other		Total	
Club	Season	Division	Apps	Goals	Apps	Goals	Apps	Goals	Apps	Goals	Apps	Goals
Manchester United	2010–11	Premier League	0	0	0	0	0	0	0	0	0	0
Manchester United	2011–12	Premier League	0	0	0	0	0	0	0	0	0	0
Manchester United	2012–13	Premier League	0	0	0	0	0	0	–		0	0
Manchester United	Total		0	0	0	0	0	0	0	0	0	0
Bradford City (loan)	2010–11	League Two	3	0	0	0	0	0	0	0	3	0
Doncaster Rovers (loan)	2011–12	Championship	3	0	0	0	0	0	–		3	0
Oldham Athletic (loan)	2011–12	League One	15	0	0	0	0	0	–		15	0
Coventry City (loan)	2012–13	League One	6	0	0	0	3	0	1 (Note: Appearances in the Football League Trophy)	0	10	0
Ipswich Town (loan)	2012–13	Championship	1	0	–		–		–		1	0
Watford	2013–14	Championship	1	0	0	0	2	0	–		3	0
Carlisle United (loan)	2013–14	League One	12	0	0	0	0	0	–		12	0
Barnsley	2014–15	League One	13	0	2	0	1	0	2	0	18	0
Bury (loan)	2015–16	League One	28	0	5	0	0	0	2	0	35	0
Sheffield United (loan)	2016–17	League One	2	0	1	0	0	0	2	0	5	0
Bury	2016–17	League One	7	1	0	0	0	0	0	0	7	1
Rochdale	2017–18	League One	3	0	0	0	1	0	0	0	4	0
Career total			94	1	8	0	7	0	7	0	116	1
