= 2009–10 Notts County F.C. season =

Association football season

Notts County
2009–10 season
- Chairman: John Armstrong-Holmes; Peter Trembling; Ray Trew
- Manager: Ian McParland; Dave Kevan and Michael Johnson (interim); Hans Backe; Dave Kevan (interim); Steve Cotterill
- League Two: 1st (champions)
- FA Cup: Fifth round
- League Cup: First round
- League Trophy: First round
- Top goalscorer: League: Lee Hughes (30); All: Lee Hughes (33)
- Highest home attendance: 11,331 vs Cheltenham Town, 1 May
- Lowest home attendance: 4,213 vs Bradford City, 6 November
Home colours	Away colours

During the 2009–10 English football season, Notts County competed in Football League Two, the fourth tier of the English football league system. Shortly before the season began, the club was subject to a high-profile takeover by Munto Finance, purportedly a wealthy Middle East-based consortium with ambitions to take the club to the Premier League. The former England manager Sven-Göran Eriksson was appointed director of football, and lavish spending began in apparent early efforts to achieve these ambitions. In reality, Munto Finance was controlled by the convicted fraudster Russell King, and the club had been acquired as part of an elaborate scheme to list a fake mining company on the stock exchange. The promised money did not exist, King fled when the scheme collapsed and Notts County were left deeply in debt. Eriksson resigned following a further takeover by Ray Trew, who prevented bankruptcy and oversaw a successful conclusion to the season, with the team winning the League Two championship and promotion to Football League One. The team also fared well in the FA Cup, reaching the last sixteen of the competition.

The season saw four different owners, three permanent first-team managers and two spells of interim management. In total, the team played 54 competitive matches, winning 31, drawing 14 and losing nine. Lee Hughes scored 33 goals across all competitions, becoming the first Notts County player to score 30 goals in a season since Tommy Lawton sixty years earlier, while Ben Davies made the most appearances, featuring in 51 games. Munto Finance's takeover and the wider scheme of which it formed a part were investigated by journalists from the beginning. It was the subject of a 2011 episode of the BBC One show Panorama, a BBC Sounds podcast series in 2022, and a documentary for Sky Documentaries in 2025. Notts County continued to experience off-field problems over the following years, culminating in a four-year spell in non-League football between 2019 and 2023; coverage of the club's plight and subsequent attempts to recover often refer to the events of 2009.

== Background ==
=== Notts County ===
In the 2009–10 season, Notts County (nicknamed the Magpies) competed in League Two, the fourth tier of the English football league system, their sixth successive year at this level. The club's time in the fourth tier had been preceded by a serious financial crisis. Between 2002 and 2003, Notts County had spent a record 534 days in administration. Bankruptcy was prevented in a takeover largely financed by supporter Haydn Green; as part of the deal, the Notts County Supporters' Trust also gained representation on the board of directors. In 2007, shortly before his death, Green sold his stake in the club to the Trust for £75,000, making the latter the majority shareholder. The Trust were not required to pay Green upfront; instead, the £75,000 would only be paid to Green (or his estate after his death) if the Trust sold their shares in the future.

The years after exiting administration saw the team consistently struggle. It was relegated to League Two in 2004, and was in danger of relegation to non-League football before its final game of the 2005–06 season. In 2007–08, League Two safety was assured only in a 1–0 win over Wycombe Wanderers in the penultimate game of the season, while the following season the team finished 19th. The sustained poor on-field performance resulted in supporters becoming progressively more unhappy under Trust ownership. There were rumours that the club had taken on large loans from unknown individuals in response to financial problems, and the efforts of supporters to find out more were resisted by officials. In April 2009, John Armstrong-Holmes (the club's chairman) and Eric Kerry, the Trust's representatives on the club's board, survived a vote of no confidence, with Armstrong-Holmes arguing that his and Kerry's removal would mean "potential investment may be jeopardised".

=== Russell King and associates ===
The Munto Finance takeover of Notts County was orchestrated by Russell King, who had first been convicted of fraud in 1991 after falsely reporting his Aston Martin had been stolen to claim £600,000 in insurance. Before his involvement in Notts County, King had stolen £671,000 from Belgravia Financial Services Group, and had acquired a 49% stake in the investment bank First London by falsely claiming he was managing billions of dollars for the Bahraini royal family. The others involved were Nathan Willett and his father Peter, of whom little is known; in 2022, the makers of a BBC podcast series about the takeover were unable to locate even a forwarding address for the pair. Once the takeover was completed, Peter Trembling acted as executive chairman of Notts County; Matt Scott of The Guardian would later describe him as Munto Finance's "mouthpiece". Following the takeover's collapse, Trembling maintained that he had been deceived, and that he had lost much of his own money as a result of the affair.

== Pre-season events ==
=== Takeover ===
While preparing for the 2009–10 season, Notts County were approached by Trembling, who indicated that Munto Finance was interested in buying the club. At a meeting, Trembling told Armstrong-Holmes that Munto Finance were a Middle East-based consortium, and that unspecified royalty was involved. A further meeting took place in Bahrain between Armstrong-Holmes and Roy Parker (a shareholder in the club and its vice chairman) and representatives of the consortium. According to Armstrong-Holmes, King was in attendance, but played no part in the talks until Armstrong-Holmes demanded a bank guarantee as a condition of a sale, which King soon produced. Unbeknown to Notts County's representatives, the guarantee, which appeared to be from First London, was worthless. It had not been approved by the bank's board and came from a part of the bank that no longer existed. A deal was agreed, with the takeover announced in July 2009. Trembling was appointed as chief executive, and Munto Finance announced its ambition to see Notts County promoted to the Championship within five years.

As part of the deal, Munto Finance insisted that it be given ownership of the club for nothing, and the Trust pushed its members to approve the "gift" of the Trust's shares to the consortium. As this would not be a sale, no money would need to be paid to the estate of Haydn Green. Some supporters protested, questioning whether paying Green's estate would not be the "honourable thing" to do, but Armstrong-Holmes urged Trust members to back the deal, saying that "Haydn Green's position in the club's history is acknowledged and will be honoured by Munto". Trust members voted overwhelmingly in favour of the transfer of the shares, and Munto Finance consequently acquired the club for free. Chris Porter, who discussed the takeover in a study of fan ownership of football clubs, says that the sale "amounted to an up-front outlay from the would-be recipient of promised future riches", and that the Trust failed to ask why supposedly wealthy investors were unwilling to make a relatively modest initial outlay to buy the club. The identity of those who would be financing the club was shrouded in secrecy, but the journalist and Notts County supporter Simon Goodley was soon tipped off about the involvement of King, and he began to investigate. Also soon investigating was Matt Scott, who was encouraged to do so by a source after noting in his column that the takeover had not yet been approved.

=== Player transfers, arrival of Sven-Göran Eriksson ===
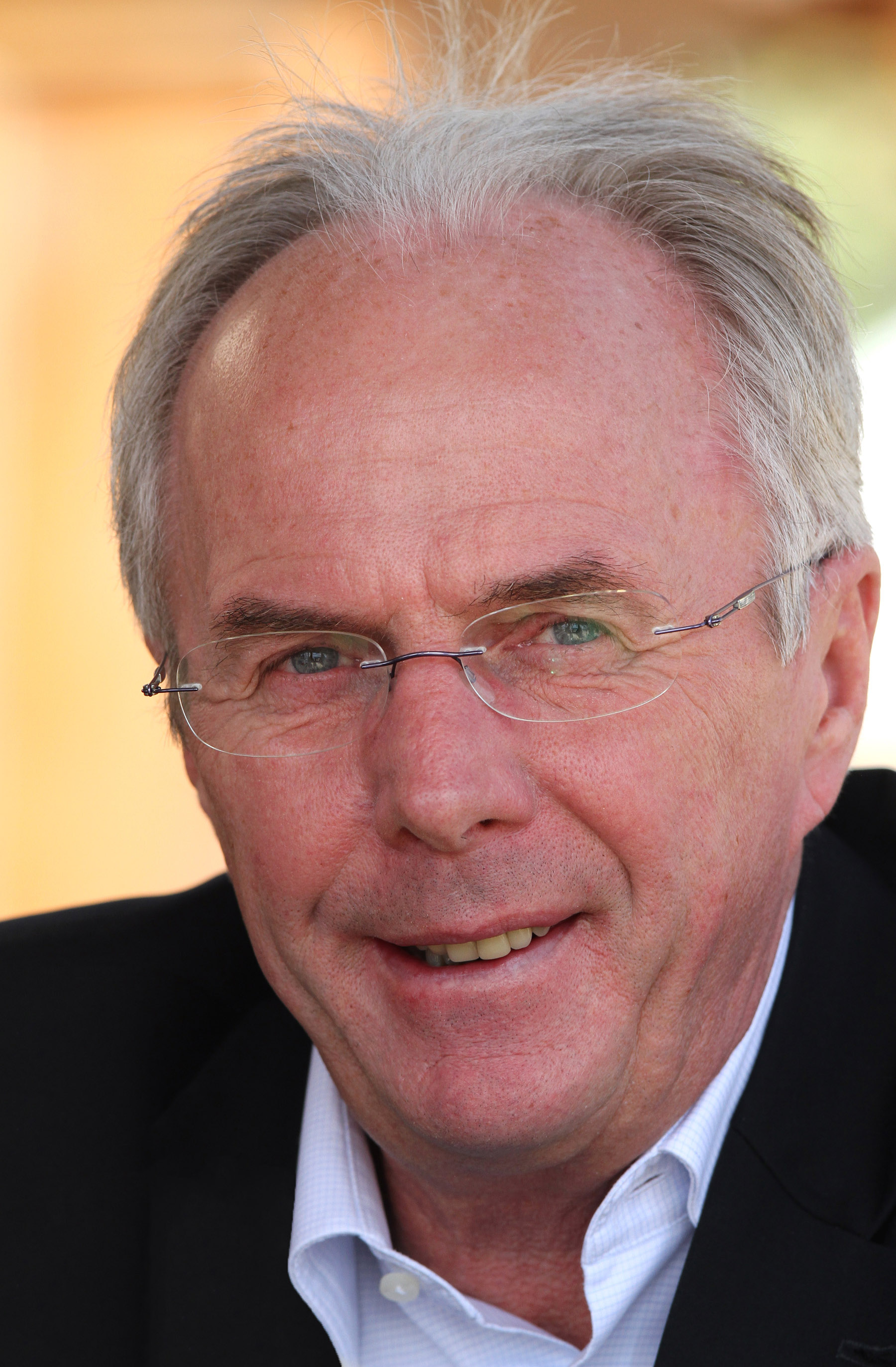
Sven-Göran Eriksson (pictured in 2012)

Notts County had already begun signing players for the 2009–10 season before the takeover, with these players either being from League Two or non-League clubs or joining on loan. Midfielders Neal Bishop, Ben Davies and Ricky Ravenhill joined from Barnet, Shrewsbury Town and Darlington respectively, while Kettering Town striker Craig Westcarr had joined on a one-year deal. Also signing pre-takeover were defenders Graeme Lee, who joined the club for an undisclosed fee from Bradford City, and Brendan Maloney, who joined on a six-month loan from Nottingham Forest. In the week after Munto Finance took control of the club, the Magpies announced the signing of two strikers, Lee Hughes and Luke Rodgers, on free transfers from Oldham Athletic and Yeovil Town respectively.

On 22 July, Notts announced the appointment of the former England manager Sven-Göran Eriksson as director of football in what Stuart James of The Guardian described as "one of the game's most staggering moves of recent times". Despite Munto Finance's initially stated target of seeing Notts County promoted to the Championship, Eriksson said he wanted to see the club promoted to the Premier League. Eriksson said he was "particularly attracted to this role and the unique opportunity to help build a club over the longer term". With Eriksson's appointment, Notts began to target, or were linked in the press with, much more high-profile players. At one point, reports suggested the Brazil international and World Cup winner Roberto Carlos might join the club. On another occasion, David Beckham was asked by a radio journalist about the possibility of working with his old England manager. The club's final pre-season signing was that of striker Karl Hawley from Preston North End for an undisclosed fee.

=== Friendlies ===
To prepare for the new season, the Magpies played a series of friendlies. The first match after Eriksson's arrival, the game against Nottingham Forest at Notts County's Meadow Lane stadium, attracted nearly 13,000 spectators, and saw Eriksson "paraded" before the crowd prior to kick off.

==== Match details ====
Key

- In result column, Notts County's score shown first
- H = Home match
- A = Away match

Results

Date	Opponents	Result
21 July 2009	Arnold Town (A)	7–0
25 July 2009	Nottingham Forest (H)	2–1
28 July 2009	Derby County (H)	2–3
31 July 2009	Liverpool XI (H)	2–2

== League Two ==
=== August–October ===
Notts started the season strongly. Hughes scored a hat-trick on the opening day as the Magpies defeated Bradford 5–0 at home with over 9,000 spectators in attendance. The team won 4–0 at Macclesfield Town in its first away game, but then suffered its first defeat, losing 2–1 at Chesterfield. During August, the club used its apparent new-found wealth to strengthen its squad. The signing of goalkeeper Kasper Schmeichel from Manchester City for an undisclosed fee believed to surpass the club record was announced on 14 August. That of Johnnie Jackson from Colchester United (also for an undisclosed fee) followed two days later. Schmeichel made his debut in a 3–0 home win over Dagenham & Redbridge on 22 August. Three days later, Notts announced the signing of England international Sol Campbell on a five-year contract: "there were offers from the Premier League but that would have been short-term. I'm thinking of the future", he told the BBC. In their final match of the month, Notts were beaten 1–0 at Barnet.

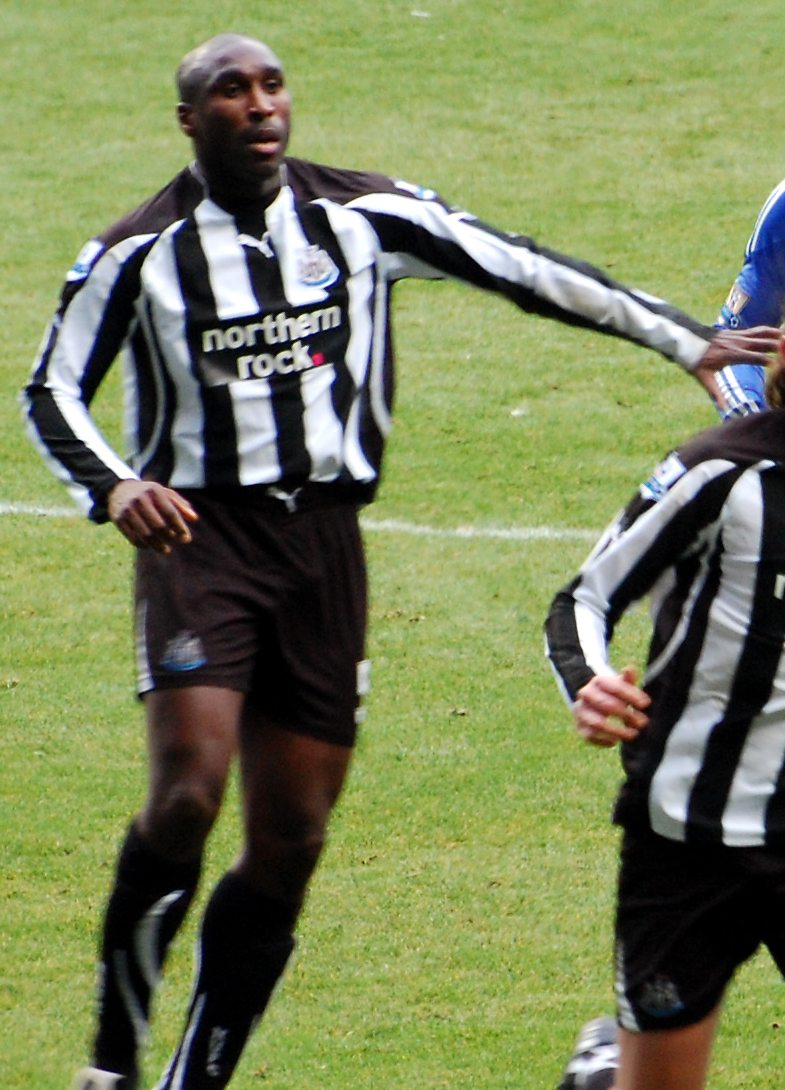
Sol Campbell (pictured in 2010) made his only Notts County appearance in September.

Early in September, Notts County strengthened their squad further, bringing in winger Matt Ritchie on loan from Portsmouth until the end of December. The month began with two home games, a 1–1 draw with Burton Albion and a 5–2 win over Northampton Town in which Hughes scored his second hat-trick of the season. Campbell made his debut the following week at Morecambe, but he could not prevent the Magpies from losing 2–1. It proved to be Campbell's only game for the club, as he left by mutual consent four days later. He had grown suspicious that the club's supposed wealth was not real; defender Mike Edwards later said that, shortly before leaving, Campbell had warned his teammates of his doubts. Despite losing Campbell, Notts ended the month with two victories, a 3–1 home win over Port Vale and a 3–0 win at Lincoln City in which Rodgers scored a hat-trick.

On 21 September, the Football League confirmed they were investigating the takeover. It had still not been approved by the league, who were demanding to know the identity of the new owners. The same week, King's involvement in the takeover was made public by Goodley in The Sun, though King maintained he had acted as an advisor on only "strategic and media issues" and had relinquished his role after Notts County had appointed a new communications manager. On 27 September, in an effort to satisfy the league as to the identity of the new owners, Notts named two Middle East-based families as among the club's new investors, a move soon undermined when a member of one of the families denied involvement. Scott also questioned whether King really had ceased to be involved, noting the latter's continued close connections with the companies and individuals linked with Munto Finance.

October began with two draws, the first 1–1 at Cheltenham Town, the second 2–2 at home to Torquay United, a result which left the Magpies in fifth place, four points from top spot. The day after the latter, Ian McParland was sacked as manager, replaced on an interim basis by Dave Kevan and Michael Johnson. Kevan and Johnson ultimately took charge for two matches, a 0–0 draw at Rotherham United and a 2–0 home win over Crewe Alexandra. In the meantime, on 20 October, the Football League approved the takeover, accepting Notts County's new owners as fit-and proper persons despite still not knowing who they were. With the takeover now sanctioned, Notts moved to appoint their new manager. Eriksson and Trembling held talks with Roberto Mancini, who was keen on the job, but Eriksson was by now growing concerned about the lack of investment being made in the club, and warned Mancini to wait. Ultimately, Hans Backe was appointed instead. Backe took charge of Notts County's final match of October, a 1–1 draw at home to Shrewsbury Town.

=== November–January ===
In early November it was revealed that Notts County's parent company was subject to a winding-up petition due to £400,000 of unpaid debt. This was despite assurances to the Notts County Supporters' Trust, made when the takeover was agreed, that the debts would be settled quickly. The club narrowly avoided a court hearing on the issue on 12 November, two days before the team's first league match of November, a 3–3 draw at Bury. This match saw an unusual first-half incident, when Daniel Nardiello of Bury beat Schmeichel and fired the ball towards an empty net, only to see the ball become stuck in mud before it had crossed the goal line, allowing Schmeichel enough time to run back and gather. After a 0–0 home draw with Aldershot Town, Notts travelled to Rochdale in their final league match of the month, where they fell to a 2–1 loss.

Shortly after the Rochdale match, it was revealed that the Football League had renewed its investigation into Notts County's ownership. The club's off-field position was by now deteriorating rapidly, with King seemingly having vanished, and with creditors visiting the club frequently to demand payment. Despite the mounting problems, the Magpies won their first two games of December, 4–0 at home to Darlington and 2–0 at Hereford United. In the days following the latter, it was reported that Trembling was planning a management buyout of the club, and that Eriksson was on the verge of resigning. Armstrong-Holmes also told The Guardian that he now felt he had been "hoodwinked" into handing the club over to Munto Finance. Trembling completed his takeover on 12 December, promising to look for fresh investment for the club. The same day, Notts were beaten 2–1 at home by Accrington Stanley. This proved to be Backe's final game; he resigned shortly afterwards, with Kevan resuming temporary charge. In their final match of the month, the Magpies won 4–1 at Burton with Hughes scoring a hat-trick.

Notts County's financial problems continued in the new year. Early in January, the club was served with a new winding-up petition issued by HMRC. The situation was not helped by the unusually cold winter forcing the postponement of matches and denying the club much-needed income. Trembling claimed Notts needed investment of £25 million to retain Eriksson and sustain the ambition to reach the Premier League, but the required investment had not been found by the week the club was due in court in connection with the winding-up petition. The day before the hearing, the Magpies played their first league match of the month, a 3–0 win at Dagenham. On 27 January came news that the court had been granted a 28-day extension to the club to settle its debt with HMRC, though the latter requested that this be marked as final; no further extensions would be forthcoming. The team played its final match of the month on 30 January, defeating Barnet 2–0 at home.

=== February–May ===
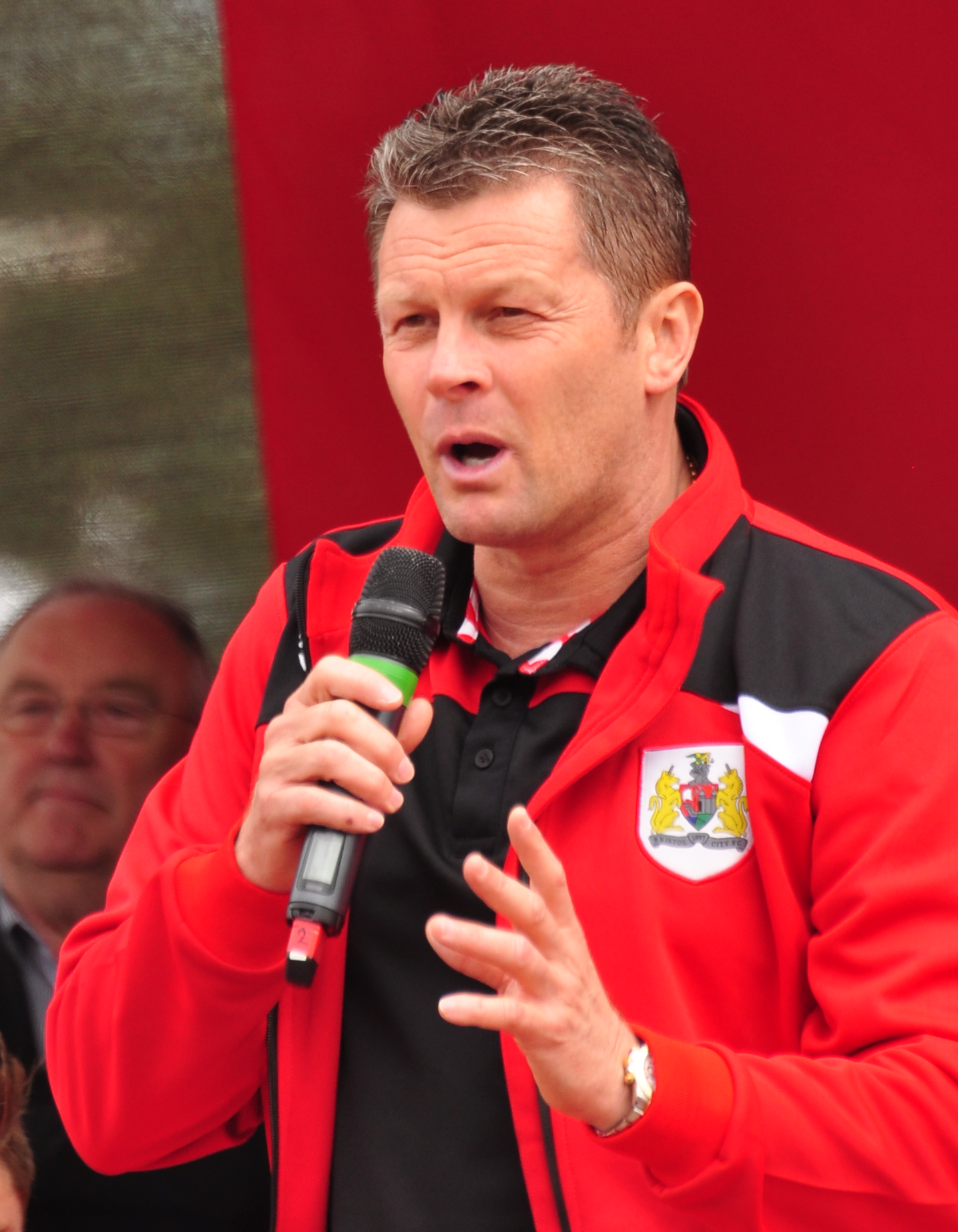
Steve Cotterill (pictured in 2015) was appointed manager in February.

In their first match of February, the Magpies won 1–0 at Grimsby Town. A 2–1 defeat at AFC Bournemouth followed in the next game, before the team played Grimsby again, this time a 1–1 draw at Meadow Lane. On 11 February, news came that Ray Trew had agreed to buy the club. In a statement, Trembling said Trew was "not of the £25m+ ilk", but did have sufficient funds to prevent the Magpies from going bankrupt. As a result of the takeover, Trembling and Eriksson both departed their posts, though Eriksson was given the "non-active" role of joint life president of the club. Though Notts had been saved, Trew warned supporters that the club's position remained precarious and administration could not be ruled out. Notts County's first league match following the takeover was a 1–1 draw at Aldershot, a result which left the Magpies in seventh place, fourteen points from top spot. Three days later, on 23 February, Trew announced that administration would not be necessary, and that he had appointed Steve Cotterill as manager for the remainder of the season. Cotterill took charge for the first time in the final game of February, a 5–0 home win over Hereford in which Westcarr scored a hat-trick and Rodgers a brace.

March began with consecutive wins over Macclesfield, Accrington, and Chesterfield; the last of these saw Notts County move up to fourth place, three points behind Bournemouth, their next opponents. A Hughes brace gave Notts 1–0 and 2–1 leads, but an injury-time equaliser for the away team earned Bournemouth a 2–2 draw. Despite the concession of a late goal, the result moved the Magpies into the top three. There then followed two away matches, the first a 1–0 win at Crewe, the second a 0–0 draw with Bradford which extended the team's unbeaten run to nine. Now in second place, Notts hosted third place Rotherham in their final match of the month. The game appeared to be heading for a goalless draw entering the final minute, but a 90th minute goal from Rodgers gave the Magpies a 1–0 win, allowing them to end March in second place, with 68 points from 36 matches, 10 points behind top spot.

April began with a 5–0 home win over Bury, with five different goal scorers for the Magpies. That same afternoon, the league leaders Rochdale were beaten 2–0 at Chesterfield; these results meant Notts had reduced the gap between themselves and first place to seven points, having played a game less. Rochdale were held to a draw in their next game, allowing Notts to move within five points with a 1–0 win at Shrewsbury. Rochdale would then lose their next two matches, and Notts took first place after a 1–0 win at Northampton and a 3–1 home win over Lincoln. Promotion to League One was confirmed on 17 April with a 4–1 home win over Morecambe, before Notts played Rochdale at Meadow Lane on 20 April. The match attracted 10,536 spectators, and was won 1–0 by the home team through a 30th minute goal by Hughes. The victory put the Magpies four points clear of second with a game in hand, and was described by Paul Fletcher of the BBC as "a huge step towards sealing the League Two title". Notts lost their next match at Port Vale, but then clinched the title on 27 April with a 5–0 win at Darlington. The team were presented the trophy after their final home game, a 5–0 win over Cheltenham, before the season concluded with a 0–0 draw at Torquay.

=== Match details ===
Key

- In result column, Notts County's score shown first
- H = Home match
- A = Away match
- pen. = Penalty kick
- o.g. = Own goal

Results

Date	Opponents	Result	Notts County goalscorers	Attendance	Source
8 August 2009	Bradford City (H)	5–0	Davies, Hughes (3, 1 pen.), Moloney	9,396	
15 August 2009	Macclesfield Town (A)	4–0	Ravenhill, Hunt, Wright (o.g.), Westcarr	2,785	
19 August 2009	Chesterfield (A)	1–2	Edwards	6,196	
22 August 2009	Dagenham & Redbridge (H)	3–0	Hughes, Hawley, Jackson	6,562	
29 August 2009	Barnet (A)	0–1		2,858	
5 September 2009	Burton Albion (H)	1–1	Hawley	8,891	
12 September 2009	Northampton Town (H)	5–2	Ritchie (2), Hughes (3, 1 pen.)	7,154	
19 September 2009	Morecambe (A)	1–2	Davies	3,335	
26 September 2009	Port Vale (H)	3–1	Hughes (2, 1 pen.), Collins (o.g.)	7,561	
29 September 2009	Lincoln City (A)	3–0	Rodgers (3)	5,527	
3 October 2009	Cheltenham Town (A)	1–1	Rodgers	4,134	
11 October 2009	Torquay United (H)	2–2	Westcarr, Davies	8,812	
17 October 2009	Rotherham United (A)	0–0		5,738	
24 October 2009	Crewe Alexandra (H)	2–0	Rodgers, Westcarr	6,545	
31 October 2009	Shrewsbury Town (H)	1–1	Lee	7,562	
14 November 2009	Bury (A)	3–3	Hughes (2), Ritchie	3,602	
21 November 2009	Aldershot Town (H)	0–0		6,500	
24 November 2009	Rochdale (A)	1–2	Flynn (o.g.)	2,779	
1 December 2009	Darlington (H)	4–0	Rodgers, Hughes (2), Davies	4,606	
4 December 2009	Hereford United (A)	2–0	Westcarr, Edwards	2,727	
12 December 2009	Accrington Stanley (H)	1–2	Hughes (pen.)	5,855	
26 December 2009	Burton Albion (A)	4–1	Ravenhill, Hughes (3, 1 pen.)	5,801	
26 January 2010	Dagenham & Redbridge (A)	3–0	Davies, Hughes, Ogogo (o.g.)	1,916	
30 January 2010	Barnet (H)	2–0	Hawley, Davies	6,444	
6 February 2010	Grimsby Town (A)	1–0	Hughes	4,452	
9 February 2010	AFC Bournemouth (A)	1–2	Bishop	5,472	
17 February 2010	Grimsby Town (H)	1–1	Hughes	5,163	
20 February 2010	Aldershot Town (A)	1–1	Davies	4,016	
27 February 2010	Hereford United (H)	5–0	Westcarr (3, 1 pen.), Rodgers (2, 1 pen.)	6,036	
2 March 2010	Macclesfield Town (H)	1–0	Clapham	4,672	
6 March 2010	Accrington Stanley (A)	3–0	Davies, Hughes, Rodgers	2,123	
9 March 2010	Chesterfield (H)	1–0	Davies	7,341	
15 March 2010	AFC Bournemouth (H)	2–2	Hughes (2)	6,120	
20 March 2010	Crewe Alexandra (A)	1–0	Edwards	5,003	
23 March 2010	Bradford City (A)	0–0		11,630	
27 March 2010	Rotherham United (H)	1–0	Rodgers	9,015	
3 April 2010	Bury (H)	5–0	Edwards, Westcarr, Davies, Hughes, Facey	7,005	
5 April 2010	Shrewsbury Town (A)	1–0	Davies	6,287	
10 April 2010	Northampton Town (A)	1–0	Davies	5,647	
13 April 2010	Lincoln City (H)	3–1	Hughes, Lee, Facey	7,501	
17 April 2010	Morecambe (H)	4–1	Hughes (2), Ravenhill, Davies	8,500	
20 April 2010	Rochdale (H)	1–0	Hughes	10,536	
24 April 2010	Port Vale (A)	1–2	Lee	7,459	
27 April 2010	Darlington (A)	5–0	Jackson, Edwards, Westcarr, Rodgers (2)	2,112	
1 May 2010	Cheltenham Town (H)	5–0	Lee, Hughes (2), Davies, Rodgers	11,331	
8 May 2010	Torquay United (A)	0–0		5,124	

=== Partial league table ===
League Two final table, leading positions
Pos	Team	Pld	W	D	L	GF	GA	GD	Pts	Qualification
1	Notts County	46	27	12	7	96	31	+65	93	Division Champions, promoted
2	AFC Bournemouth	46	25	8	13	61	44	+17	83	Promoted
3	Rochdale	46	25	7	14	82	48	+34	82	Promoted
4	Morecambe	46	20	13	13	73	64	+9	73	Participated in play-offs
5	Rotherham United	46	21	10	15	55	52	+3	73	Participated in play-offs
6	Aldershot Town	46	20	12	14	69	56	+13	72	Participated in play-offs
7	Dagenham & Redbridge	46	20	12	14	69	58	+11	72	Participated in play-offs, promoted

== Cup competitions ==
=== FA Cup ===
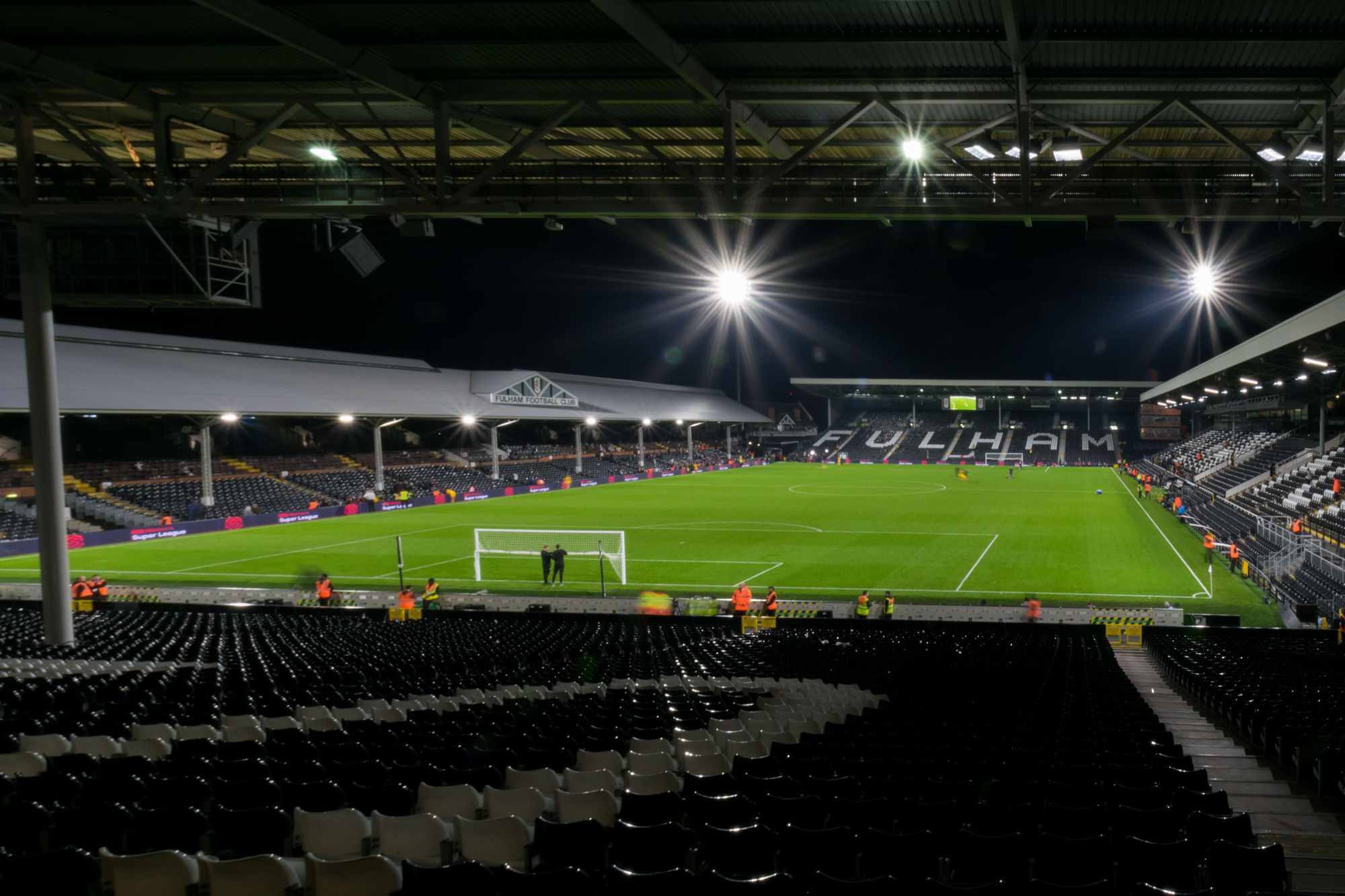
Notts County reached the FA Cup fifth round for the first time since 1992, facing Premier League side Fulham at Craven Cottage (pictured in 2018).

Notts County's FA Cup campaign began in the first round with a home match against fellow League Two club Bradford. Karl Hawley and Johnnie Jackson scored shortly before and after half time, and the Magpies won 2–1. Notts defeated League Two opposition again in the second round, this time coming from 0–1 down to win 2–1 at Bournemouth, and so earned a home tie with Forest Green Rovers of the Football Conference in the third round. As the match was due to be played in the midst of Trembling's efforts to find a new buyer for the club, he had reportedly hoped to use the tie as an opportunity to host potential investors; the match, however, was postponed due to freezing weather conditions. The tie eventually went ahead on 20 January and was won 2–1 by the Magpies, who consequently reached the FA Cup's fourth round for the first time in 15 years.

Notts County's next opponents were Premier League side Wigan Athletic, who visited Meadow Lane on 23 January. A crowd of 9,073 saw the Magpies take a 2–0 first half lead through goals from Hughes and Davies, but Wigan fought back in the second half, and a late goal from Ben Watson meant the match finished 2–2, meaning a replay would be required. With speculation ongoing about the club's future, Davies welcomed the replay as a "chance to get in the headlines for the right reasons". In the replay, a 75th minute goal from Stephen Hunt, followed shortly afterwards by an own goal from Wigan's Gary Caldwell, gave the Magpies a 2–0 win over their Premier League opponents. The victory meant Notts County progressed to the fifth round of the FA Cup for the first time since 1992. Here, the Magpies were drawn away to another Premier League club, this time Fulham. The match, coming shortly after Trew's purchase of the club, resulted in a 4–0 defeat for Notts, who were consequently eliminated from the competition.

==== Match details ====
Key

- In result column, Notts County's score shown first
- H = Home match
- A = Away match
- pen. = Penalty kick
- o.g. = Own goal

Results

Date	Opponents	Result	Notts County goalscorers	Attendance	Source
5 November 2009	Bradford City (H)	2–1	Hawley, Jackson	4,213	
28 November 2009	AFC Bournemouth (A)	2–1	Hughes, Westcarr	6,082	
20 January 2010	Forest Green Rovers (H)	2–1	Hunt, Hughes	4,389	
23 January 2010	Wigan Athletic (H)	2–2	Hughes, Davies	9,073	
2 February 2010	Wigan Athletic (A)	2–0	Hunt, Caldwell (o.g.)	5,519	
14 February 2010	Fulham (A)	0–4		16,132	

=== League Cup ===
As a League Two team, Notts County entered the League Cup in the first round, where they were drawn at home to Doncaster Rovers of the Championship. The Magpies lost 1–0 and were thus eliminated from the competition.

==== Match details ====
Key

- In result column, Notts County's score shown first
- H = Home match
- A = Away match
- pen. = Penalty kick
- o.g. = Own goal

Results

Date	Opponents	Result	Notts County goalscorers	Attendance	Source
11 August 2009	Doncaster Rovers (H)	0–1		4,893	

=== Football League Trophy ===
In the first round of the Football League Trophy, a competition for League One and Two teams, Notts County were drawn away to Bradford. The match finished 2–2, requiring a penalty shootout to determine the winner. Bradford won this 3–2, and the Magpies were eliminated from the competition.

==== Match details ====
Key

- In result column, Notts County's score shown first
- H = Home match
- A = Away match
- pen. = Penalty kick
- o.g. = Own goal

Results

Date	Opponents	Result	Notts County goalscorers	Attendance	Source
6 October 2009	Bradford City (A)	2–2 (a.e.t.)	Westcarr, Facey	3,701	

== Players ==
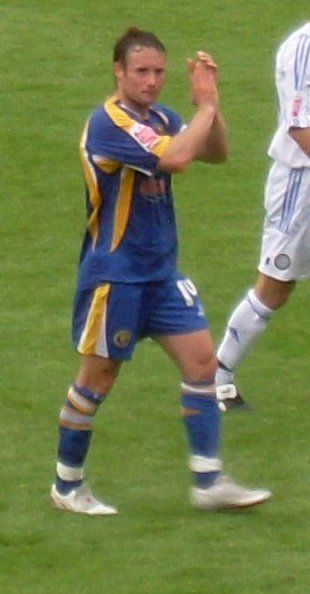
Ben Davies (pictured in 2008) played in 51 of Notts County's 54 games in 2009–10.

Before Trew's takeover, Notts County had been penalised for breaking League Two's salary cap, which required wages exceed no more than 60% of revenue. Though Trew claimed to have rectified this, the club nevertheless spent much of the season under a transfer embargo, unable to sign any further players. A total of 24 players made at least one appearance for Notts County during the 2009–10 season. Of these, Ben Davies played in the most games, featuring in 51 of 54 matches. Eight other players – Neal Bishop, Mike Edwards, Lee Hughes, Ricky Ravenhill, Luke Rodgers, Kasper Schmeichel, John Thompson and Craig Westcarr – made a minimum of 40 appearances, while three players (Sol Campbell, Sean Canham and Nathan Fox) played only once, the latter two's appearances coming as substitutes.

Hughes scored 33 goals across all competitions during the campaign. In doing so, he became the first Notts County player to score 30 goals in a season since Tommy Lawton in 1949–50. Davies (16), Rodgers (13) and Westcarr (11) were the other players to reach a minimum of 10 goals. Goalkeeper Kasper Schmeichel kept 24 clean sheets in his 43 league appearances, setting a new club record for the most in a season.

=== Player statistics ===
Key

Pos = Playing position

Nat. = Nationality

Apps = Appearances

GK = Goalkeeper

DF = Defender

MF = Midfielder

FW = Forward

Numbers in parentheses denote appearances as substitute.

Pos.	Nat.	Name	League Two		FA Cup		League Cup		League Trophy		Total	
Pos.	Nat.	Name	Apps	Goals	Apps	Goals	Apps	Goals	Apps	Goals	Apps	Goals
FW	ENG	Ade Akinbiyi	1 (9)	0	1	0	0	0	0	0	2 (10)	0
MF	ENG	Neal Bishop	39 (4)	1	1	0	1	0	1	0	42 (4)	1
MF	ENG	Sol Campbell	1	0	0	0	0	0	0	0	1	0
FW	ENG	Sean Canham	0 (1)	0	0	0	0	0	0	0	0 (1)	0
DF	ENG	Jamie Clapham	17 (13)	1	5	0	1	0	1	0	24 (13)	1
MF	ENG	Ben Davies	45	15	6	1	0	0	0	0	51	16
MF	ENG	Mike Edwards	37 (3)	5	4	0	1	0	1	0	41 (3)	5
FW	GRN	Delroy Facey	7 (11)	2	0 (1)	0	0	0	1	1	8 (12)	3
DF	ENG	Nathan Fox	0 (1)	0	0	0	0	0	0	0	0 (1)	0
DF	ENG	Matt Hamshaw	2 (18)	0	0 (3)	0	1	0	0	0	3 (21)	0
DF	ENG	Karl Hawley	14 (17)	3	2 (3)	1	1	0	1	0	16 (20)	4
GK	ENG	Russell Hoult	3 (1)	0	1	0	1	0	0	0	5 (1)	0
FW	ENG	Lee Hughes	39	30	5	3	0 (1)	0	0	0	44 (1)	33
DF	ENG	Stephen Hunt	32	1	5	2	1	0	0	0	38	1
MF	ENG	Johnnie Jackson	20 (4)	2	6	1	0	0	0	0	26 (4)	3
DF	ENG	Daniel Jones	7	0	0	0	0	0	1	0	8	0
DF	ENG	Graeme Lee	31 (1)	4	3	0	0	0	1	0	35 (1)	4
DF	IRE	Brendan Moloney	18	1	0	0	1	0	0	0	19	1
MF	ENG	Ricky Ravenhill	40	3	6	0	1	0	1	0	48	3
MF	SCO	Matt Ritchie	12 (4)	3	1 (1)	0	0	0	0 (1)	0	13 (6)	3
MF	ENG	Luke Rodgers	27 (15)	13	0 (5)	0	1	0	0	0	28 (20)	13
GK	DEN	Kasper Schmeichel	43	0	5	0	0	0	1	0	48	0
DF	IRE	John Thompson	38 (2)	0	5	0	1	0	1	0	45 (2)	0
FW	ENG	Craig Westcarr	33 (9)	9	5 (1)	1	0 (1)	0	1	1	39 (11)	11

== Aftermath and legacy ==
=== Investigations of the takeover ===
Investigations of the Munto Finance takeover, and the broader scheme of which it was part, continued after its collapse. One was undertaken by the BBC journalist Peter Marshall, whose investigation was broadcast in an episode of Panorama shown on BBC One in April 2011. A BBC Sounds podcast series produced by the journalist (and Notts County supporter) Ben Robinson in 2022, and a documentary produced for Sky Documentaries in 2025, uncovered further information. These investigations, together with the reporting of Matt Scott, confirmed King's central role. Eriksson gave an interview to Scott shortly after the former's departure from Notts, in which Eriksson said that King had played a pivotal part in convincing him to join the club. Meanwhile, Marshall found evidence of King giving orders and approving finances at Meadow Lane, and Trembling told Marshall that King had been his boss.

The investigations revealed a complicated network of companies. Munto Finance was a subsidiary of Qadbak Investments, which was in turn closely connected to a third company, Swiss Commodity Holding (SCH), the sole directors of which were Nathan and Peter Willett. (Note: King himself, who said he had "never been a shareholder, director, trustee or beneficiary", was not listed as a director of SCH. Philip Sinel, a lawyer who investigated King, told Marshall that King would always try to hide his involvement in companies. At Notts County, King acquired the nickname Lord Voldemort due to his insistence that his name not be included in any documents (Voldemort, the main antagonist of the Harry Potter series, is often referred to as "He-Who-Must-Not-Be-Named"). Asked by Marshall how King was able to orchestrate his schemes, Sinel explained "other people front for him".) Eriksson had been promised a shareholding in SCH, and Campbell handed a £33,000 per week "ambassadorial" contract (in addition to his contract with Notts County). The company's logo was even incorporated into Notts County's badge. King was preparing a fraudulent stock market floatation of SCH, which presented itself as a mining company with reserves of $1.9 trillion and the rights to extract the mineral wealth of North Korea (despite lacking the means of doing so). The takeover of Notts County, together with a similar attempted takeover of the BMW Sauber Formula One team, was intended to lend positive publicity to SCH and drive interest in its floatation. Had King succeeded in getting SCH listed, it would have resulted in "a fraud on a colossal scale".

King and Nathan Willett visited North Korea in October 2009, taking with them Eriksson and Abid Hyat Khan, a man introduced to Eriksson as a Bahraini prince, but in fact an alleged fraudster hiding from British police. During the visit, Eriksson was asked by North Korean officials to fix a favourable 2010 FIFA World Cup group for the North Korea team. King and his SCH colleagues held meetings with North Korean officials during the visit, during which he handed out certificates to his hosts for shares in SCH supposedly worth $2 billion. However, the delegation's departure from Pyongyang International Airport was considerably delayed, with the North Koreans apparently having grown suspicious. Eriksson described a tense wait before the flight was allowed to leave, with King and Willett "panicking and sweating". King's scheme effectively collapsed, and he fled to Bahrain. Marshall would later track him down and confront him there, but King closed the door on Marshall without speaking. Nathan Willett also disappeared.

In 2012, while still in Bahrain, King, posing as "Jack Bartholemew", provided a dossier of information to the journalists and authors Anthony Summers and Robyn Swann, purporting to demonstrate North Korea's nuclear capability; King would have received an advance from a book Summers and Swann wrote with the material, but the latter were able to establish his identity. King then launched another fraudulent scheme, this time creating a magazine which he passed off as a Middle East-based edition of the Financial Times to obtain the advertising revenue and barter deals. In 2018, King was extradited from Bahrain to Jersey to stand trial in connection with still another fraud, this one perpetrated in Jersey in 2008. He was convicted in 2019 and sentenced to six years imprisonment. At a later hearing, Jersey authorities ordered that he pay £322,212 in connection with the case or face additional time in prison. Released in 2021, he was confronted again at his home by Alice Levine, the presenter of the BBC Sounds series, in the course of her and Robinson's investigation. He refused to come to the door, and even denied that he was Russell King.

=== Consequences for Notts County ===
"We expected it to be bad, but probably not this bad", Jim Rodwell, Notts County's new chief executive, said of the club's finances a month after Trew's takeover. At that point, the club was thought to be £6.9 million in debt. Trew later said that the final debts were in fact £7.3 million, including a six figure sum owed to a law firm and £250,000 owed to Campbell for his solitary appearance. The situation would have been worse had Eriksson not agreed to forgo £2.5 million owed to him by the club. There was considerable anger towards Notts County from other League Two clubs, who felt that the Magpies had not been punished sufficiently for breaking the salary cap. Trew dismissed this in an open letter, claiming the club's FA Cup run and his investment had brought it within the salary cap, though he acknowledged this had not been the case before his arrival. Nevertheless, Notts were required to release Schmeichel, reportedly earning £15,000 per week, following the season's conclusion, with Trew explaining that retaining and attempting to gain a transfer fee for the goalkeeper would have been a huge risk for a club with such precarious finances.

Notts County remained in League One for five years until returning to League Two in 2015. Interest in the Munto Finance takeover has continued in the years since, particularly as the club continued to experience off-field problems. In 2016, with the club once again subject to winding up petitions, and Trew looking to sell, Harry Reardon of These Football Times wrote of the "bizarre" takeover, hoping that a proposed sale to overseas investors would "go a little better than last time". Trew sold the club to Alan Hardy, a Nottingham-based businessman, in December 2016, but by 2019 the Magpies were not only once again in the midst of a severe financial crisis but also relegated to non-League football for the first time in their history. Coverage of the club's plight at that time referenced the events of 2009. During the 2022–23 season, some journalists framed the club's efforts to win promotion back to the league as an attempt to recover from the off-field problems of the previous two decades, the 2009 takeover among them.
