= Nathan Fox =

Nathan Fox may refer to:

- Nathan Fox (comics) (born 1975), American comics artist, working on Dark Reign amongst others
- Nathan Fox (footballer) (born 1992), English footballer
- Nathan Fox (psychologist), American neuroscientist
- Nathan Fox (triple jumper) (born 1990), English triple jumper
