= 2011–12 Derby County F.C. season =

Derby County F.C.
2011–12 season
- Chairman: Andrew Appleby
- Manager: Nigel Clough
- Championship: 12th
- Jack Stamps Trophy: Craig Bryson
- FA Cup: Fourth round
- League Cup: First round
- Top goalscorer: League: Steve Davies (12); All: Steve Davies/Theo Robinson (12)
- Highest home attendance: 33,010 vs. Southampton, Championship (15 October 2011), Leeds United, Championship (26 December 2011) and Nottingham Forest, Championship (13 March 2012)
- Lowest home attendance: 7,073 v Shrewsbury Town, League Cup (9 August 2011)
- Average home league attendance: 26,020
Home colours	Away colours

The 2011–12 season was Derby County's 106th season in the Football League and their 113th overall in league football. It was their fourth consecutive season in the second tier following the previous campaign and their 44th overall. Derby started the season well, winning their first 4 league games in August, which was also club's best league start since the 1905–06 season. However, the club were knocked out of the first round of League Cup against League Two opposition for the third season in a row against Shrewsbury Town. Derby maintained their top 2 position in September, with the main highlight being a 2–1 win at local rivals Nottingham Forest, despite the fact that goalkeeper Frank Fielding gave away a penalty and was sent off after 67 seconds, Jeff Hendrick's winner in the game was his first goal in senior football. October and November were disappointing with Derby picking up only 1 win and 5 points out of a possible 30 as Derby fell to 15th place in the league, with a 4–0 defeat at rivals Leicester City at the start of the month, starting the slump in form. In mid-October, Nigel Clough and his backroom staff signed new 3 1/2-year contracts. Derby picked up form in December and January, losing only twice in 9 games, picking up 17 points as Derby ended the month 12th peaking at 8th in mid-January. February was another disappointing month, where they picked up 1 point, scoring no goals with the club suffering their 2nd 4–0 defeat of the season at the hands of Southampton by the end of the month, Derby were 15th in the table. From the start of April to mid march, Derby picked up 14 points out a possible 21 which lifted Derby to 11th in the table, 5 points off the play-offs with 4 games remaining, Derby manager Nigel Clough however ruled out a play-off place, wishing there was more the 4 games left as the club were showing great form. However defeats to Middlesbrough and Cardiff City in 4 days ended the Derby's play-off chances. Derby finished the season 12th in the league, 11 points off the play-off players, with Nigel Clough being satisfied with the performances of the team, stating a lack of firepower as the reason why they fell short and a target to improve in 2012–13. Derby ended the season with a win and a draw as they finished in 12th place on 64 points, 7 places and 15 points better off than the previous season, the club's first top half finish since promotion in 2007 and best league standing since relegation in 2008.

Derby's summer signings had mixed fortunes with Craig Bryson, Jason Shackell & Frank Fielding all being in contention for the Player of the Year award. Striker Theo Robinson was joint top scorer with Steve Davies on 12 goals and Jamie Ward's form impressed enough to earn him a new contract. Tom Naylor also earned praise from Nigel Clough for his development and impressed when standing in for John Brayford at right-back. Nathan Tyson, signed from local rivals Forest however failed to score in 24 appearances, Chris Maguire struggled to break into the first team and was loaned out to Portsmouth for the final two months of the season. Chris Riggott rejoined the club on a one-year contract, but was released in December due to injuries. The club relied less on loan signings and more on the club's academy as Jeff Hendrick, Mark O'Brien, Callum Ball, Mason Bennett and Will Hughes all broke into the first team, Bennett and Hughes making their debuts with Bennett setting a club record for youngest ever team player, making his first appearance against Middlesbrough on 22 October 2011 at 15 years and 99 days old, beating Lee Holmes' record by 169 days.

The club's reserve side had a less successful year than in the two previous seasons, with the club missing out on the Central League title by one point from Sheffield United, as well as being beaten in the Derbyshire Senior Cup final by Buxton. Derby also reached the final of the Central League Cup final against Manchester City Elite Development squad.

The club recorded an average attendance of 26,020, down by exactly 3 from the previous campaign and still the third highest in the Championship behind West Ham United and Southampton. This was also the 14th best average attendance in the country, higher than the average gate of eight Premier League clubs. In October 2011, Derby County announced that they had submitted plans to Derby City Council for a £7 million development of land outside the stadium, which the club named "The Plaza @ Pride Park". The plans included five cafes/restaurants, two convenience stores and 2,000 square metres of office space. The plans were scaled down from the planned £20 million development proposed in 2007. Derby County CEO Tom Glick, said that the plans would help the club deal with the new Financial Fair Play regulations, due to be introduced in the Football League from 2012, as revenue from the Plaza was intended to be reinvested back into the club. The planned development also coincided with plans from the City Council to build a multi-use sports arena on the same site as the proposed Plaza. Derby City Council's Planning Control Committee gave planning permission for The Plaza @ Pride Pride Park development in January 2012, with Chief Executive Tom Glick stating the club had started looking for a development company to build the plaza.

== Team kit ==
The team kit for the 2011–12 season is produced by Adidas and sponsored by website buymobiles.net. The new home kit for was revealed on 4 June 2011. The away kit was revealed on 15 July 2011.

Home colours	Away colours

== Review ==
=== Pre-season ===
In a post-match interview after a 2–0 defeat at home to Bristol City on 30 April 2011, Derby manager Nigel Clough stated that whilst talking with the fellow management staff during the game he had wondered "How many of those players out who started today we want out there on 6 August (and the answer is) not too many" and that he intended to bring in "6, 8, maybe 10" new players in the close season. Flying in the face of such talk was press speculation that Clough, fearing interference, would quit his position at Derby to return to Burton Albion. The Rams ended the season in 19th, their lowest position on the league ladder in 5 years. The final tally of 49 points was the club's lowest ever from a 46-game season and their lowest in the second tier since 1984. At the end of May, the club announced it had sold 16,200 Early Bird Season tickets for the following campaign, just 500 down from the same point last season.

Following the completion of the 2010–11 season, Derby announced their retained list for the 2011–12 campaign. Goalkeeping trio Saul Deeney, Ross Atkins and James Severn were all given new deals to their expiring contracts, whilst Callum Ball, Alex Witham, Aaron Cole and Chris Jones become first-year professionals after completing their scholarship programmes. The next month Ball also signed a new three-year contract, which extended his stay at the club until at least 2014. The club also confirmed the departures of Michael Boulding, Chris Porter, Greg Mills and Arnaud Mendy, alongside the retiring Robbie Savage, as they would not be offered new deals, and that loanees Brad Jones, Daniel Ayala and Alberto Bueno would all return to their parent clubs.

The club quickly entered into the transfer market, tying up permanent deals for loanees Frank Fielding, Jamie Ward and Theo Robinson within 48 hours of the end of the season, with Fielding signed for £400k and Ward and Robinson signing for undisclosed fees, rumoured to total £500k. The first "new" capture of the summer came in the shape of Kilmarnock captain Craig Bryson, who signed for £350k, rising to £450,000 after add-on clauses. Later that same month, Derby added two additional signings in the shape of Jason Shackell and Chris Maguire. Barnsley captain Jason Shackell was the club's biggest signing of the Summer Transfer window. After several unsuccessful offers, Derby had a bid in the region of £1m accepted and the player joined on a three-year contract. Miles Addison, who signed a contract extension until 2013 on the same day, joined Barnsley on loan for six months as part of the deal. Another protracted transfer concerned Scottish international striker Chris Maguire. On 1 June, it was announced Chris Maguire would sign for the club on the expiration of his Aberdeen contract after agreeing a three-year deal at Pride Park. However, after Derby failed to match Aberdeen's £400,000 compensation claim, it was revealed that the final fee would be decided by a FIFA Tribunal. However, after much discussion between the two clubs, on 29 June, two days before the expiry of his contract, Maguire's signing was formally announced, with the two clubs agreeing to a compensation in the region of £400,000.

Despite capturing six new permanent signings by the end of June, Derby still hadn't finished rebuilding and added two more captures on 1 July. The most controversial was that of Nottingham Forest's Nathan Tyson. On 7 June, it was confirmed that Nathan Tyson was in contract talks with the club, despite a controversial incident where Tyson waved a Nottingham Forest flag in front of the Derby fans after the final whistle of the East Midlands derby match in August 2009, a game which Tyson scored in and Forest won 3–2. Tyson was hit with a two-game suspended ban and a £5,000 fine for the incident. Tyson was confirmed as a Derby County player on 13 June, signing a 3-year pre-contract agreement and formally joining on 1 July. A less contentious signing came in the shape of Burton Albion goalkeeper Adam Legzdins, who joined from League Two club Burton Albion on a three-year deal, Clough stating that he would return to first choice goalkeeper Frank Fielding. The close seasons final captures came late on.

Former defender Chris Riggott was invited to train with the club in an attempt to regain fitness and impressed enough to earn a contract offer from the club, which he subsequently signed. The other signing came in the form of a six-month loan deal for Hull City defender Kevin Kilbane, who would challenge Gareth Roberts for the club's left-back position.

Uncompleted moved included a rejected £1.25m move for Leicester City striker Martyn Waghorn and an approach for Watford midfielder John Eustace, who had had a loan spell at the club in 2009. Rumoured targets included Birmingham City pair Kevin Phillips and Lee Bowyer, and Adam Rooney of Inverness Caledonian Thistle The start of July also saw a rumours of a move for former Forest midfielder Guy Moussi. There were also rumours of an audacious swoop for Manchester United and England striker Michael Owen, which Clough himself later dismissed as "silly season" speculation.

With the capture of ten players, there came the necessity of shifting out those not in the first team picture to balance the club's wage bill. The biggest sale, and the only one from which Derby received a fee, was Luke Varney, who joined Portsmouth for a fee of £750,000 after lengthy speculation. The only other permanent departure, not counting contract expirations, was Ben Pringle. Pringle was told he was free to find another club, despite being handed a new 18-month contract just 3 months earlier, and subsequently agreed personal terms with Rotherham United. signing for the club on a free transfer later the same day. The only other departures saw goalkeeper Ross Atkins join Burton Albion on a season-long loan move and another young goalkeeper, James Severn joined Eastwood Town until 1 January. There was also rumour of an Aberdeen move for Russell Anderson being accepted, but the player rejected the chance of a move, preferring to remain at Pride Park.

The players and management team returned to pre-season training on 1 July, with former loanee goalkeeper Matt Duke and left back Danny Blanchett also joining training after being released by their respective clubs. Striker Michael Boulding, who had been released at the start of the season, also trained with the club during pre-season and former Notts County left winger Nathan Fox played 90 minutes during a pre-season friendly against Burton Albion.

=== August ===
Derby's first game of the 2011–12 season came at home to relegated Birmingham City and saw full debuts for Jason Shackell, Craig Bryson and Kevin Kilbane. Despite going a goal down, Derby struck back to claim a 2–1 victory, which included a debut goal for Shackell, who earned a spot in the Championship Team of the Week. This was followed by consecutive 1–0 wins away to Watford and Blackpool, with winning goals courtesy of Steve Davies, who earned a Team of the Week placing for his performance, and Craig Bryson respectively. The run was the first time Derby had opened a campaign with a three-game winning streak since 1948 and the first time in the club's history it had been achieved with two away fixtures in the run. The following match against Doncaster Rovers was the 300th league game at the Pride Park Stadium and saw Derby in with a chance of making their best start to a season in over 100 years if they could achieve a victory. In the result of the match The Rams cruised to a 3–0 victory, with Steve Davies getting his third in four games, Kevin Kilbane getting his first goal for the club and Ben Davies scoring his first of the campaign and earning a place in the Championship Team of the Week. The result lifted Derby to second in the embryonic 2011–12 table and saw the Rams open with four from four, the first time this had been achieved since the start of the 1905–06 season when the club recorded a club record five straight opening victories. Four days after the result, the club revealed that right back John Brayford, who had played every minute of every game since his arrival at Pride Park one year earlier, had signed a new contract extending his stay at the club until the summer of 2014. The visit of Burnley was the final game before the international break and saw Derby crash to their first defeat of the season, as Theo Robinson's equaliser turned out to be a mere consolation in a 2–1 home loss. Regardless of the defeat, Nigel Clough remained defiant, stating "I don't want this to diminish the start we've had. 12 points from 15 has been absolutely brilliant and the manner in which we've achieved them."

With the international break stopping play, eyes moved to what the club would do prior to the closing of the Transfer Window on 1 September, with the long term chase for a holding midfielder and an additional striker suggesting that the club's work in the transfer market had not yet finished. However, the club's only movement saw academy graduate Ryan Connolly join Scottish First Division side Ayr United on loan until 31 December and youth team winger Aaron Cole head out to Eastwood Town on a one-month deal. Glick explained the lack of activity with a statement via. the club's official website in which he said "We continue to make inquiries and calls in regards to strengthening the squad, but it may be that things happen when the loan window re-opens next week. We have been extremely active in our recruitment this summer - signing 10 players - and we very satisfied the quality and experience we have brought in. It is no secret that we expected, and needed, to move some players on during this window to balance the squad with the new intake, and that element has so far proved challenging. This means we are carrying players and wages that are not part of our plans for this campaign or beyond, and we need to rectify that. It is important not to abandon our philosophy of responsible governance of this Club; with the Financial Fair Play rules set to be introduced in the Football League in 2012, it makes it even more imperative." One of the players thought to not be part of the club's plans was defender Dean Leacock, with media speculation that he was going to be offered a contract termination. Other financial news saw it revealed amount of money Derby spent on agents' fees had fallen by almost £150,000 between July 2010 and July 2011, paying out £289,500 as opposed to £434,350 in the previous 12 months. The figure saw Derby tumble down the Championship Agent's Fees table to 18th, having topped it three years before. Thefigure was made up of 57 transactions, including 18 new registrations/transfers, eight updated contracts, 13 contracts cancelled and 18 loans.

=== September ===
The international break saw a surprise call-up to the England squad for Frankie Fielding following West Ham United's Rob Green's withdrawal through injury. Although Fielding was unused for the two Euro 2012 qualifiers, he became the first Derby player in 11 years to have a role for England, since Seth Johnson's appearance against Italy in 2000. When Fielding returned to Derby he and his teammates resumed Championship action away to Coventry City, where two second half goals condemned them to a second consecutive defeat, this time 2–0.

The day before the Coventry defeat it was announced that Nigel Clough had been nominated for the Championship Manager of the Month award, but lost out to Brighton & Hove Albion's Gus Poyet. Prior to the game, Clough also spoke of his desire for patience and his commitment to bringing through youth at Derby. Reflecting on Clough's comments, the Derby Evening Telegraph stated "The conveyor belt at Derby has juddered and stalled at times and in many ways it has been rusted by constant changes within the Academy set up" before highlighting past academy-graduates England international Tom Huddlestone, Northern Ireland international Lee Camp, Wales international Lewin Nyatanga and England U21 internationals Lee Grant, Giles Barnes and Lee Holmes (all of whom were no longer with the club) as examples that the current youth set-up should aim to emulate. As if to prove that Derby's youth production was back on track, academy graduate Mark O'Brien, who had played in every game of the new season despite being just 18 years old, signed a new four-year contract, extending his stay at the club until the summer of 2015. On the same day, winger Dave Martin joined Walsall on a months loan and the following week Stephen Bywater moved to Sheffield Wednesday until the end of the year with goalkeeping coach Martin Taylor saying of Bywater "He's not in the squad at all. Nothing against Stephen because he's worked really hard but he doesn't figure in our plans. At his age he just needs to play games and get in the shop window." There was also a link with Mansfield Town's Tom Naylor, who played for the reserves in a bid to earn a contract offer from the club, and Clough laughed off West Bromwich Albion's rumoured £3m interest in John Brayford, saying "Is that all, £3million?"

17 September bought the first East Midlands derby of the season, as Derby travelled to the City Ground to face Nottingham Forest. With midfielder James Bailey injured in the week prior to the match, an ankle injury which ruled him out for three months. Derby unsuccessfully tried to sign former-Captain Matt Oakley on loan from Leicester City to bolster the midfield. The already contentious fixture saw tensions heightened by the news that Nathan Tyson, who had injured himself in pre-season following his move to Derby from Forest, was finally available for selection for the Rams. In the event of the match, Frank Fielding was sent off after just 66 seconds after bundling over Forest striker Ishmael Miller giving Adam Legzdins to make his first appearance for the club, with his first action being to pick Andy Reid's penalty out of the back of the net. However, Jamie Ward's 29th-minute equaliser, a mazy run past three Forest defenders before he beat Lee Camp at his near post from the byline, saw the ten-man Derby side level at half-time. The second half saw Nathan Tyson come on for his Derby debut, but it was 19-year-old academy graduate Jeff Hendrick, who like Mark O'Brien had broken into the first team after impressive performances and was named in the Championship Team of the Week on the back of his performance, who grabbed the headlines when he scored midway into the second half with his first professional goal and claimed Derby's third win at the City Ground in five attempts. The victory was followed with four points from the next two home games - a 3–0 thumping of Millwall which saw John Brayford, Ben Davies and Jeff Hendrick named in the Championship's 'Team of the Week' and a 1–1 draw with Barnsley - to take them into the automatic promotion spots. The results came in midst of discussion over Clough's contract - which was due to expire at the end of the season, with Forest allegedly interested in securing their former-player's services.

=== October ===
The first game of October, and Derby's final game before the international break saw Derby make the short trip to Leicester City. In the event of the game, Derby were on the end of a thumping 4–0 defeat, which included two goals in the final two minutes, but remained in third place in the table thanks to results elsewhere. It was the club's biggest defeat for almost exactly two years (after a 1–6 mauling at Cardiff City on 29 September 2009) and left Clough asking supporters to not let the result "overshadow what has been a great start to the season for us." The heavy nature of the defeat, which was partially attributed to player exhaustion due to the constraints of a regular Championship season being placed on Derby's small squad, led to questions about potential investment over the next two weeks, with CEO Tom Glick stating that "we have our eye firmly on what it will take to get through the first half of the season before January and if we feel we're light, we'll make a move" before reaffirming that he didn't foresee any new signings ahead of the next game, at home to Southampton. The club also made public its intention to offer a new contract to Jeff Hendrick, who had enjoyed an excellent start to his first full season of professional football. The international break allowed Derby the time to try to bring back some of the squads injured key players, with Chris Riggott, Shaun Barker, Paul Green and Nathan Tyson all showing signs of nearing return to the first team picture. They was a further boost to the squad when Jason Shackell was nominated for Championship Player of the Month, though he lost out to Middlesbrough's Matthew Bates.

The return to league action saw a high-profile fixture at home to league leaders Southampton, with a sell out crowd (the first of the season) making the match the fourth highest attended of the day in English football. Theo Robinson's 3rd-minute strike saw Derby open the scoring in an eventual 1–1 draw, though they owed much to an inspired performance from Frank Fielding for keeping them in the game. The draw came despite the absence of John Brayford, who missed his first match since joining Derby 15 months previously after picking up an injury in training, and top-scorer Steve Davies' early exit after picking up an eye injury. With the Brayford ruled out for six weeks and Davies for twelve, Derby cast their eye over the emergency loan market and confirmed they have enquired about Newcastle United's James Perch though Newcastle denied the request as the player was providing defensive cover. Two days after the game it was announced Nigel Clough, alongside his backroom staff, had signed new 3 1/2-year deals at Derby to take them through until summer 2015. The following day, Derby let the lead slip twice as they drew 2–2 at Reading and lost 2–0 at Middlesbrough the following weekend to drop to 6th in the table, their lowest position of the table, and stretch their winless streak to five games. The Middlesbrough game was notable for featuring the debut of the highly touted Mason Bennett, who set a club record for youngest ever team player, making his first appearance at 15 years and 99 days old. The final game of October saw Derby rise to fifth in the table and finally ending their winless streak by grabbing their first win in 6 with a 3–1 win over Portsmouth, with strikes from Craig Bryson and Jamie Ward sandwiching Chris Maguire's first league goal for the club on his first league start in an acclaimed performance. Craig Bryson's performance earned him a place in the Championship Team of the Week. and Mason Bennett also made his first home appearance, coming on in the second half. The match saw injuries to Theo Robinson (hamstring), Mark O'Brien (shoulder) and Chris Maguire (broken nose) to add to eight other injured first team players (Shaun Barker, John Brayford, Steven Davies, Saul Deeney, Nathan Tyson, James Bailey, Paul Green and Chris Riggott). With eleven senior players unavailable, the club admitted it "might" consider entering the loan market, though Clough later stated "We are trying to find the solutions from within the squad", suggesting that their frequent use of the loan market in previous seasons had had a destabilizing effect on the squads of the time.

Away from the pitch, Derby County announced that they had submitted plans to Derby City Council for a £7 million development of land outside the stadium, which the club named "The Plaza @ Pride Park". The plans included five cafes/restaurants, two convenience stores and 2,000 square metres of office space. The plans were scaled down from the planned £20 million development proposed in 2007. Derby County CEO Tom Glick, said that the plans would help the club deal with the new Financial Fair Play regulations, due to be introduced in the Football League from 2012, as revenue from the Plaza was intended to be reinvested back into the club. The planned development also coincided with plans from the City Council to build a multi-use sports arena on the same site as the proposed Plaza.

=== November ===
The first match of the month saw Derby crash to a 3–0 defeat at home to Cardiff City, their biggest home defeat for 22 months, and drop out of the playoff for the positions for the first time in the season. Russell Anderson added to the club's injury problems by going off with a damaged hamstring. Despite Derby's numerous injury issues. Clough insisted loans weren't needed and instead loaned out midfielder Stephen Pearson to fellow Championship side Bristol City until 2 January. The last match before the November international break saw Derby race into a 2–0 lead away to Peterborough United, courtesy of a Theo Robinson brace, before losing 3–2 thanks to a stoppage time winner and slipping to a season low of 8th in the table. The winning goal was a bone of contention for Clough, whose post match criticism of referee Iain Williamson was strong enough to earn him a £2,000 fine from the FA. Speaking after the defeat, Clough stated that the recent results (one win from eight) had clouded the seasons positives, such as the "emergence of (the) youngsters". The match saw Will Hughes make his debut as a late substitute at the age of just 16, meaning Derby finished the game with five Academy graduate players aged 19-or-under on the pitch (Jeff Hendrick, Mark O'Brien having started and Mason Bennett, Callum Ball and Hughes appearing as substitutes).

During the international break Derby added to the squad, with the loan signing of Mansfield Town defender Tom Naylor and trials for defender Daniel Lafferty and forward Edwin Gyasi. The first game after the break, at home to Hull City, also saw the return to the squad of Shaun Barker, Paul Green and John Brayford., though it was not enough to prevent The Rams crash to their third straight defeat as the visitors ran out 2–0 winners. The result meant Derby had won just one of the last 9 fixtures, slumping from 2nd to 9th in the table, though Clough dismissed the poor form as "not a concern". The game also saw top-scorer Theo Robinson go off with a hamstring injury in the first 15 minutes, an injury which saw the club begin to scour the loan market for a replacement striker ahead of the emergency loan window's closure the following Thursday. On the day that the emergency loan window closed, Ipswich Town's Tamás Priskin joined The Rams on a five-week deal, with youth team winger Aaron Cole going out on loan to Conference National side Stockport County on a similar deal. Priskin scored on his debut to give Derby the lead at West Ham United but The Rams eventually fell to a 3–1 defeat to slip to 15th in the table on the back of a fourth consecutive defeat. This was followed by a 1–0 defeat at home to Brighton and Hove Albion, which was a fifth straight defeat and meant that November yielded no points and just three goals.

=== December ===
Derby's first fixture of December saw them earn their 5,000th league point in their history, as a Paddy McCarthy own goal helped earn the club a 1–1 draw away to Crystal Palace and earn The Rams their first point in six games. A week later they followed it with a first win since October, as Callum Ball's first senior goal say Derby turn a 1–0 deficit into a 2–1 victory at home to Bristol City. The match was sandwiched by two contracting pieces of contract news - the day before the game it was announced midfielder Jeff Hendrick had committed to the until 2015, whereas two days after it was announced Russell Anderson's injury plagued two years at the club had been ended when his contract was cancelled by mutual consent. There was also strong rumours that Stephen Bywater would make his loan move to Sheffield Wednesday permanent. On 22 December, Chris Riggott's contract was terminated by mutual consent, a move which formally went ahead on 1 January. The Bristol City victory was followed by a 1–0 defeat away to Ipswich Town. now managed by Clough's predecessor Paul Jewell, and a Boxing Day victory over Leeds United, to take Derby to 31 points at the half-way stage of the season - 1 point ahead of the same stage previous season. The Leeds game saw Nathan Tyson make his first start for Derby, five months after joining the club following a succession of groin problems. Ahead of the final game of the year, a home fixture against second placed West Ham, and with the club's wage bill restricting Derby's potential in the transfer market Clough revealed his intention to move on no less than six players in the upcoming transfer window, with Stephen Pearson (Bristol City), Stephen Bywater (Sheffield Wednesday), Dean Leacock, David Martin, Lee Croft and Tomasz Cywka, all of whom were entering the final six months of their contracts, seemingly on their way out. Bywater was the first to leave following the cancellation of his contract by mutual consent. The Rams rounded off 2012 with a 2–1 home victory over second placed West Ham United which saw Callum Ball and Paul Green, with his first goal in over a year, give Derby a 2–0 lead within 10 minutes. It was only the second time in the last ten years that Derby had finished the year with maximum points and saw them rise to 10th in the table, just two points from the play off positions.

=== January ===
The club opened the season with a 1–0 victory away at Hull City, courtesy of a Theo Robinson goal. It meant that Derby became the only side in English football to take a full 9 points from the festive fixtures and was the first time Derby had achieved the feat for 16 years. The win was followed by 1–0 home victories over Crystal Palace (in the FA Cup 3rd Round) and Coventry City in the league, to take The Rams to five consecutive victories in all competitions, their best run of form of the season. The winning run ended with a 2–0 FA Cup defeat to Stoke City and then subsequent results of a 0–0 draw at Burnley and a 3–2 midweek defeat at Barnsley.

With the opening of the transfer window, Derby made permanent Tom Naylor's loan move from Mansfield Town on a three-year deal, and signed Sunderland striker Ryan Noble on a month's loan for a second time; Noble having also had a loan spell at the club in the previous campaign. Tottenham Hotspur midfielder Tom Carroll joined the club on loan until the end of the season. These were the only three incoming transfers, though several players left the club; Dave Martin joined Southend United for an undisclosed fee and Stephen Pearson and Dean Leacock both had their contracts terminated by mutual consent, allowing them to join Bristol City and Leyton Orient respectively. Tomasz Cywka saw a transfer back to Poland fall through (which later turned out to be Ekstraklasa leaders Śląsk Wrocław), with Clough indicating that the player could leave as his contract was up in the summer and there was no intention of offering him a new deal. Cywka eventually joined Reading on a free transfer. In addition, Lee Croft joined Scottish Premier League side St Johnstone until the end of the season whilst Miles Addison and Aaron Cole extended their loans at Barnsley and Stockport County respectively by one month.

Away from the pitch, Derby City Council's Planning Control Committee gave planning permission for The Plaza @ Pride Pride Park development, with Chief Executive Tom Glick stating the club had started looking for a development company to build the plaza.

=== February ===
Derby were set to being the month local rivals Nottingham Forest, however the game was postponed due to heavy snow. The club's form in February was disappointing, with club picking up only one point in a 0–0 draw against Millwall, a 61st minute Noel Hunt goal ensured a 1–0 defeat to Reading, this was Derby's first home defeat since losing 1–0 against Brighton & Hove Albion in November, the club suffered their joint worst result at Southampton where Derby lost 4–0 to goals from Jos Hooiveld, Aaron Martin, Adam Lallana and Tadanari Lee. Right-back John Brayford picked up a thigh injury in the game, which ruled him out for at least 6 weeks. Derby ended the month with on further defeat at home to local rivals Leicester City, a Neil Danns goal was the difference between the sides. This poor form dropped Derby from 12th in the league at start of month to 15th at the end of the month, with the gap to the play-off place increasing from 4 to 9.

Defender Miles Addison back from a loan spell at Barnsley, joined Bournemouth on loan until the end of the season.

=== March ===
Derby began the month at 3rd placed Birmingham City, a team who have lost only one home game this season, Derby were 2–0 down after 57 minutes with goals from Erik Huseklepp and Marlon King, Ben Davies made his first appearance in the first team in 2 months as a 59th-minute substitute replacing Nathan Tyson and he made an immediate impact, creating a goal for Steve Davies (the first goal since his return) 2 minutes later, with Theo Robinson grabbing an equaliser in the 66th minute, the game finished 2–2 as Derby's winless run extended to a season record 7 games. Derby got their first win 7 weeks as Derby beat play-off chasing Blackpool 2–1, Derby went behind from a Tom Ince goal, before Steve Davies scored twice in his first start since his return from injury, the performance from Davies in the game got praise from Derby coach Andy Garner and Blackpool manager Ian Holloway. Derby lost 2–1 at home to Watford, with Derby being 2–0 down after 15 minutes with goals from Sean Murray and Troy Deeney, with Steve Davies getting his fourth goal in a week with a consolation goal. Derby played local rivals Nottingham Forest in a re-arranged fixture from February, in the 80th minute defender Shaun Barker was involved in a collision with Forest striker Marcus Tudgay and Derby goalkeeper Frank Fielding and after a 6 minute in the game was substituted and rushed off to hospital with a suspected broken leg. In stoppage time Marcus Tudgay was sent off after a tackle with Steve Davies, 4 minutes in stoppage time Jake Buxton scored a late winner, which ensured Derby's first league double over Forest in 40 years as Derby won 1–0.

A day after the game, Barker was ruled out for the remainder of the season with a dislocated kneecap. However, on 22 March after further scans in hospital, Barker was facing a 16-month recovery from his injury, (ruling him out of the entire 2012–13 season) after rupturing his medial, anterior cruciate and posterior cruciate ligaments. Barker also had a 3 1/2 hour operation to remove damage to the patellar ligament, Barker will also wear a brace to the first 8 weeks to help protect the dislocated knee. Barker remains optimistic for a full recovery. Derby picked up their first away win since 2 January as they beat Doncaster Rovers 2–1 with goals from Theo Robinson and a first goal for Derby from Gareth Roberts, El Hadji Diouf scored a consolation goal. Derby lost 2–0 to Brighton & Hove Albion with goals from Iñigo Calderón and Ashley Barnes. Derby ended the month with a 3–2 win against Crystal Palace with goals from Steve Davies, Jeff Hendrick and a Theo Robinson penalty put Derby in a 3–0 lead after 49 minutes, Palace scored two late consolation goal from Chris Martin and Darren Ambrose. Derby ended the months with a 1–1 draw at Bristol City with a first half Craig Bryson goal cancelled out by Brett Pitman goal in the second half. Derby ended the month in 13th in the table, 7 points off the play-offs and 19 points clear of relegation.

Chris Maguire joined Championship strugglers Portsmouth on a month-long emergency loan. Goalkeeper Adam Legzdins rejoined former club Burton Albion on a month's loan.

=== April ===
Derby started April with a 0–0 draw at home to Ipswich Town, before taking on Leeds United at Elland Road two days later, Leeds were down to ten men as Michael Brown was given a straight red card in 25 minutes after a stomach-high tackle on Theo Robinson, goals from Craig Bryson after 32 minutes and Steve Davies after 66 minutes were enough to beat the Yorkshire side 2–0, Derby 7th consecutive win v Leeds and their 3rd consecutive league double. This result moved Derby up to 11th in the table, 5 points off the play-offs with 4 games remaining, Derby manager Nigel Clough however ruled out a play-off place, wishing there was more the 4 games left as the club picked up 14 points from a possible 21. A 1–0 defeat from a late Curtis Main winner against Middlesbrough and a 2–0 defeat at Cardiff City with goal from Joe Mason and a goal from defender Mark Hudson from his own half, mathematically ended Derby's play-off chances and ensured Derby will stay in the Championship for a 5th consecutive seasons as Derby dropped to 14th in the table, 8 points off the play-offs with two games to play. John Brayford made his first team return in the game, replacing the injured Tom Naylor at half time who picked up a tight hamstring, Jamie Ward was also replaced early in the second half with a dead leg. Ward was fit to start the next against, a visit to Portsmouth whilst Naylor was not in the matchday squad, John Brayford made his first start in two months. Derby took the lead in the 41st minute, with Jake Buxton scoring his second goal of the season. At half time goalkeeper Frank Fielding was substituted off with a groin injury to be replaced by Adam Legzdins who returned from his loan spell at Burton Albion earlier in the week, playing only one game after picking up a hip injury after a 1–0 defeat against Northampton Town in March. In the second half, former Rams striker Luke Varney scored an equalising goal in the 74th minute. On the 78th minute, Steve Davies scored a penalty to give Derby a 2–1 lead, which is how the game ended as Portsmouth were relegated to League One. Academy graduates Mason Bennett & Will Hughes were both given runouts as second-half substitutes. Ahead of the final game of the season at home to Peterborough United, midfielders Craig Bryson & Jeff Hendrick were awarded the club's Jack Stamps Player of the Year & Sammy Crooks Young Player of the Year respectively. Will Hughes given his first start in the game, with youth team players Mason Bennett, Josh Lelan & Kwame Thomas named on the substitutes bench, which featured no goalkeeper as Adam Legzdins made only his second start of the season, standing in for the injured Fielding. Jamie Ward missed out due to a thigh injury. Derby drew the game 1–1 through a 21st minute Theo Robinson goal, with David Ball equalising in the 82nd minute for Peterborough. This result lead Derby to finish 12th in the league, their best league finish since relegation in 2008 and their first top half finish and best points haul since promotion in 2007. Steve Davies and Theo Robinson finished the season joint top goal scorers on 12 goals.

Derby began contract negotiations with players approaching the end of their contracts, Jake Buxton and Gareth Roberts signed new contract to the length of two years and one year respectively. . The club have also been in contract talks with Paul Green with club giving Green until April 2012 to respond. Leeds United were reportedly interested in Green, an offer that Green rejected which means the player will leave the club in the summer. Derby manager Nigel Clough responded to the news by dropping Green for the matchday squad in the penultimate game against Portsmouth, with 17-year-old academy winger Will Hughes taking his place in the matchday squad. Rams coach Johnny Metgod stated that the club were also in contract talks with Jamie Ward whose deal ends in summer 2013, Ward signed a new two-year contract on 19 April, with an option for a further year which will extended his stay at Derby until at least the summer of 2014. Lee Croft and Miles Addison, both with one year left on their contract, have been told that they are free to leave the club in the summer. Chris Maguire's loan at Portsmouth was extended until the end of the season. Surgeon Dr Andrew Williams said in April 2012 that he was happy with the progress that captain Shaun Barker had made in his injury recovery after his first check-up, with Barker expected to be in a leg brace and crutches for at least 12 weeks. Barker has also spent 6 hours a day in a Kneehab XP, which Barker calls a "machine of death" the machine helps re-build quadriceps muscles through set spells of contraction and relaxation. Barker has also spent time in an ice machine.

At the end of the month, the Rams finally ended their interest in appointing a director of football, something the club had been considering since May 2011. The club also confirmed their interest in 20-year-old Northampton Town winger Michael Jacobs, who is out of contract at the end of the season.

== End of season squad ==
Player	Country	Squad number	Position	Signed from	Date	Fee paid	Total Derby appearances	Total Derby goals
Frank Fielding	(England)	1	Goalkeeper	Blackburn Rovers	9 May 2011	£400k	63	0
John Brayford	(England)	2	Defender	Crewe Alexandra	19 May 2010	Undisclosed	73/1	1
Gareth Roberts	(Wales)	3	Defender	Doncaster Rovers	1 July 2010	Free	66/6	1
Craig Bryson	(Scotland)	4	Midfielder	Kilmarnock	6 June 2011	£350k, rising to £450k	46	6
Shaun Barker	(England)	5	Defender	Blackpool	15 July 2009	£900k	100/5	6
Jason Shackell	(England)	6	Defender	Barnsley	21 June 2011	£750k, rising to £1m	49	1
Steve Davies	(England)	7	Forward	Tranmere Rovers	12 June 2008	£275k, rising to £725k	55/39	23
Nathan Tyson	(England)	9	Forward	Nottingham Forest	1 July 2011	Free	13/11	0
Jamie Ward	(Northern Ireland) (Note: Ward was born in Birmingham, England, but also qualifies to represent Northern Ireland internationally through his grandfather and represented them at U-19 and U-21 level before making his international debut for Northern Ireland in August 2011.)	10	Forward	Sheffield United	9 May 2011	Undisclosed	50/2	9
Chris Maguire	(Scotland)	11	Forward	Aberdeen	29 June 2011	£400k	3/5	2
Adam Legzdins	(England)	13	Goalkeeper	Burton Albion	1 July 2011	Undisclosed	2/2	0
Conor Doyle	(United States) (Note: Doyle was born in McKinney, Texas, United States, and represented them at U-20 and U-23 level, but also qualifies to represent the Republic of Ireland internationally and represented them at U-21 level before pledging his international allegiance to the United States.)	14	Forward	Creighton University	6 August 2010	Free	6/14	0
James Bailey	(England)	16	Midfielder	Crewe Alexandra	19 May 2010	Undisclosed	53/9	1
Jake Buxton	(England)	17	Defender	Burton Albion	1 July 2009	Free	36/12	3
Ben Davies	(England)	18	Midfielder	Notts County	20 January 2011	£350k	41/8	2
Tom Carroll	(England)	19	Midfielder	Tottenham Hotspur	30 January 2012	Loan	8/4	1
Theo Robinson	(England) (Note: Robinson was born in Birmingham, England, but also qualified to represent Jamaica internationally and would make his international debut for Jamaica in February 2013.)	21	Forward	Millwall	1 July 2011	Unidisclosed	37/17	14
Lee Croft	(England)	22	Midfielder	Unattached	25 June 2009	Free	20/10	1
Jeff Hendrick	(Republic of Ireland)	23	Midfielder	Trainee	2 May 2010	N/A	39/8	3
Mark O'Brien	(Republic of Ireland)	24	Defender	Trainee	1 July 2009	N/A	16/8	0
Callum Ball	(England)	25	Forward	Trainee	2 Jan 2009	N/A	14/17	3
Chris Jones	(England)	27	Defender	Trainee	1 July 2011	N/A	0	0
Mason Bennett	(England)	28	Forward	Trainee	1 July 2011	N/A	2/9	0
Will Hughes	(England)	29	Midfielder	Trainee	1 July 2011	N/A	1/2	0
Josh Lelan	(England)	30	Defender	Trainee	28 April 2012	N/A	0	0
Tom Naylor	(England)	31	Defender	Mansfield Town	2 January 2012	Undisclosed	8/1	0
Paul Green	(Republic of Ireland) (Note: Green was born in Pontefract, England, but also qualified to represent the Republic of Ireland internationally through his maternal grandmother and made his international debut for the Republic of Ireland in May 2010.)	32	Midfielder	Doncaster Rovers	1 July 2008	Free	139/4	13
James Severn	(England)	33	Goalkeeper	Trainee	1 July 2009	N/A	0/1	0
Ryan Connolly	(Republic of Ireland)	34	Midfielder	Trainee	1 Jan 2010	N/A	0/1	0
Kwame Thomas	(England)	35	Forward	Trainee	31 March 2012	N/A	0	0
Miles Addison	(England)	—	Defender	Trainee	1 July 2005	N/A	64/14	5
Ross Atkins	(England)	—	Goalkeeper	Trainee	1 July 2009	N/A	1	0
Saul Deeney	(Republic of Ireland) (Note: Deeney was born in Derry, Northern Ireland, but also qualifies to represent the Republic of Ireland internationally and represented them at U-21 level.)	—	Goalkeeper	Unattached	31 July 2009	Free	2/1	0

== Transfers ==
=== In ===
Permanent
Player	Country	Squad number	Position	Signed from	Date	Fee paid
Frank Fielding	ENG	1	Goalkeeper	Blackburn Rovers	9 May 2011	£400k
Jamie Ward	NIR	10	Forward	Sheffield United	9 May 2011	Undisclosed
Craig Bryson	SCO	4	Midfielder	Kilmarnock	6 June 2011	£350k, rising to £450k
Jason Shackell	ENG	6	Defender	Barnsley	21 June 2011	£750k, rising to £1m
Chris Maguire	SCO	11	Forward	Aberdeen	29 June 2011	£400k
Theo Robinson	ENG	21	Forward	Millwall	1 July 2011	Undisclosed
Nathan Tyson	ENG	9	Forward	Nottingham Forest	1 July 2011	Free
Adam Legzdins	ENG	13	Goalkeeper	Burton Albion	1 July 2011	Undisclosed
Chris Riggott	ENG	20	Defender	Unattached	10 August 2011	Free
Tom Naylor	ENG	31	Defender	Mansfield Town	2 January 2012	Undisclosed

Loan
Player	Country	Squad number	Position	Loaned from	Date	Loan duration
Kevin Kilbane	IRL (Note: Kilbane was born in Preston, England, but also qualified to represent the Republic of Ireland internationally through his parents and represented them at U-21 level before making his international debut for Republic of Ireland in September 1997.)	26	Defender	Hull City	2 August 2011	Four Months^{[I]}
Tom Naylor	ENG	31	Defender	Mansfield Town	15 November 2011	Six weeks
Tamás Priskin	HUN (Note: Priskin was born in Komárno, Czechoslovakia (now Slovakia), but also qualified to represent Hungary internationally through his parents and represented them at U-21 level before making his international debut for Hungary in August 2005.)	33	Forward	Ipswich Town	24 November 2011	Five Weeks
Ryan Noble	ENG	12	Forward	Sunderland	18 January 2012	One Month
Tom Carroll	ENG	19	Midfielder	Tottenham Hotspur	30 January 2012	Four months

Notes
I Kilbane was originally signed on a six-month loan, but returned to Hull City early on 29 November due to a back injury.

=== Out ===
Permanent
Player	Country	Squad number	Position	Signed from	Date	Fee paid	Total Derby appearances	Total Derby goals	Sold to	Date	Fee received
Ben Pringle	ENG	18	Midfielder	Ilkeston Town	1 July 2009	Free	7/16	0	Rotherham United	3 June 2011	Free
Robbie Savage	WAL	8	Midfielder	Blackburn Rovers	9 January 2008	£1.5m	129/8	7	Retirement	30 June 2011	N/A
Chris Porter	ENG	12	Forward	Motherwell	1 February 2009	£400k	25/25	9	End of Contract	30 June 2011	N/A
Arnaud Mendy	GNB (Note: Mendy was born in Évreux, France, but also qualifies to represent Guinea-Bissau internationally and made his international debut for Guinea-Bissau in 2011.)	24	Midfielder	Trainee	1 July 2009	N/A	0/1	0	End of Contract	30 June 2011	N/A
Greg Mills	ENG	34	Forward	Trainee	1 July 2009	N/A	0/2	0	End of Contract	30 June 2011	N/A
Michael Boulding	ENG	36	Forward	Unattached	25 February 2011	Free	0	0	End of Contract	30 June 2011	N/A
Luke Varney	ENG	22	Forward	Charlton Athletic	27 November 2008	£1m+	11/4	1	Portsmouth	6 July 2011	£750k
Russell Anderson	SCO	12	Defender	Unattached	15 January 2010	Free	18/16	1	Contract Cancelled	12 December 2011	N/A
Stephen Bywater	ENG	—	Goalkeeper	West Ham United	29 August 2006	£225k	166/1	0	Contract Cancelled	31 December 2011	N/A
Chris Riggott	ENG	20	Defender	Unattached	10 August 2011	Free	96/4	7	Contract Cancelled	1 January 2012	N/A
Dave Martin	ENG	—	Midfielder	Millwall	1 June 2010	Free	2/11	1	Southend United	4 January 2012	Undisclosed
Stephen Pearson	SCO	15	Midfielder	Celtic	11 January 2007	£750k	105/22	5	Contract Cancelled	6 January 2012	N/A
Dean Leacock	ENG	—	Defender	Fulham	11 August 2006	£375k	112/14	1	Contract Cancelled	14 January 2012	N/A
Tomasz Cywka	POL	19	Forward	Wigan Athletic	1 July 2010	Free	29/18	5	Reading	26 January 2012	Free

Loan
Player	Country	Squad number	Position	Loaned to	Date	Loan duration
Miles Addison	ENG	—	Defender	Barnsley	24 June 2011	Seven Months
Ross Atkins	ENG	—	Goalkeeper	Burton Albion	29 July 2011	Season Long
James Severn	ENG	33	Goalkeeper	Eastwood Town	14 August 2011	Five Months
Ryan Connolly	IRL	34	Midfielder	Ayr United	31 August 2011	Four Months
Aaron Cole	ENG	—	Midfielder	Eastwood Town	31 August 2011	One Month
Dave Martin	ENG	—	Midfielder	Walsall	13 September 2011	One Month
Stephen Bywater	ENG	—	Goalkeeper	Sheffield Wednesday	20 September 2011	Three Months
Stephen Pearson	SCO	15	Midfielder	Bristol City	4 November 2011	Two Months
Aaron Cole	ENG	—	Midfielder	Stockport County	24 November 2011	Nine Weeks
Lee Croft	ENG	22	Midfielder	St Johnstone	18 January 2012	Four Months
Miles Addison	ENG	—	Defender	Bournemouth	21 February 2011	Three Months
Chris Maguire	SCO	11	Forward	Portsmouth	9 March 2012	Two Months
Adam Legzdins	ENG	13	Goalkeeper	Burton Albion	20 March 2012	One Month

== Final league table ==
Pos	Team	Pld	W	D	L	GF	GA	GD	Pts
10	Brighton & Hove Albion	46	17	15	14	52	52	0	66
11	Watford	46	16	16	14	56	64	−8	64
12	Derby County	46	18	10	18	50	58	−8	64
13	Burnley	46	17	11	18	61	58	+3	62
14	Leeds United	46	17	10	19	65	68	−3	61

Updated to match(es) played on 28 April 2012. Source: BBC Sport
Rules for classification: 1) points; 2) goal difference; 3) number of goals scored.

== Results ==
Win	Draw	Loss

=== Friendlies ===
Date	Competition	Opponents	Home/ Away	Result F – A	Derby Scorers	Attendance
16 July 2011	Friendly	Burton Albion	A	3–1	S.Davies 18', 38' (pen.), B.Davies 59'	4,135
19 July 2011	Friendly	Macclesfield Town	A	2–2	Ball 13', 62'	
22 July 2011	Friendly	Morecambe	A	1–1	Fenton 66' (o.g.)	
26 July 2011	Friendly	Crewe Alexandra	A	1–2	Riggott 15'	
30 July 2011	Friendly	Exeter City	A	0–1		
3 August 2011	Friendly	Aston Villa	H	2–0	S.Davies 56' (pen.), B.Davies 76'	8,974

=== Football League Championship ===
Date	Match No.	K.O.	Opponents	Home/ Away	Result F – A	Derby Scorers	Attendance	Referee	Pos
6 August 2011	1	3.00pm	Birmingham City	H	2–1	Shackell 26', S.Davies 42'	27,210 (4,015 away fans)	N. Swarbrick (Lancashire)	4
13 August 2011	2	3.00pm	Watford	A	1–0	S.Davies 51'	12,263 (946 away fans)	D. Deadman (Cheshunt)	3
17 August 2011	3	8.00pm	Blackpool	A	1–0	Bryson 69'	13,489 (1,769 away fans)	M. Haywood (West Yorkshire)	3
20 August 2011	4	3.00pm	Doncaster Rovers	H	3–0	Kilbane 6', S.Davies 46', B.Davies 62'	23,377 (847 away fans)	O. Langford (West Midlands)	2
27 August 2011	5	3.00pm	Burnley	H	1–2	Robinson 71'	23,913 (946 away fans)	A. Haines (Tyne and Wear)	3
10 September 2011	6	5.20pm	Coventry City	A	0–2		14,219 (1,427 away fans)	C. Foy (Merseyside)	5
17 September 2011	7	1.00pm	Nottingham Forest	A	2–1	Ward 29', Hendrick 72'	27,356 (4,582 away fans)	S. Mathieson (Cheshire)	4
24 September 2011	8	3.00pm	Millwall	H	3–0	Bryson 24', Hendrick 39', S.Davies 65'	24,120 (536 away fans)	C. Webster (Tyne and Wear)	3
27 September 2011	9	7.45pm	Barnsley	H	1–1	S.Davies 62' (pen.)	23,454 (818 away fans)	N. Miller (County Durham)	2
1 October 2011	10	5.20pm	Leicester City	A	0–4		22,496 (1,324 away fans)	H. Webb (South Yorkshire)	3
15 October 2011	11	3.00pm	Southampton	H	1–1	Robinson 3'	33,010 (2,611 away fans)	M. Brown (East Yorkshire)	4
18 October 2011	12	8.00pm	Reading	A	2–2	Robinson 59', Cywka 75'	15,704 (717 away fans)	R. East (Wiltshire)	4
22 October 2011	13	3.00pm	Middlesbrough	A	0–2		17,407 (939 away fans)	C. Boyeson (East Yorkshire)	6
29 October 2011	14	3.00pm	Portsmouth	H	3–1	Bryson 3', Maguire 14', Ward 33'	24,148 (947 away fans)	C. Pawson (South Yorkshire)	5
2 November 2011	15	7.45pm	Cardiff City	H	0–3		23,078 (660 away fans)	E. Ilderton (Tyne and Wear)	7
5 November 2011	16	3.00pm	Peterborough United	A	2–3	Robinson 28', 32'	9,666 (2,372 away fans)	I. Williamson (Berkshire)	7
19 November 2011	17	3.00pm	Hull City	H	0–2		30,391 (1,720 away fans)	D. Deadman (Cambridgeshire)	9
26 November 2011	18	5.20pm	West Ham United	A	1–3	Priskin 34'	27,864 (1,173 away fans)	C. Webster (Tyne and Wear)	15
29 November 2011	19	7.45pm	Brighton & Hove Albion	H	0–1		22,040 (702 away fans)	G. Salisbury (Lancashire)	15
2 December 2011	20	7.45pm	Crystal Palace	A	1–1	McCarthy 75' (o.g.)	14,338 (444 away fans)	A. D'Urso (Essex)	13
10 December 2011	21	3.00pm	Bristol City	H	2–1	Bryson 64', Ball 73'	23,906 (747 away fans)	R. Madley (West Yorkshire)	14
17 December 2011	22	3.00pm	Ipswich Town	A	0–1		17,256 (579 away fans)	D. Webb (Lancashire)	16
26 December 2011	23	1.00pm	Leeds United	H	1–0	Ward 67'	33,010 (4,172 away fans)	A. Bates (Staffordshire)	14
31 December 2011	24	1.00pm	West Ham United	H	2–1	Ball 2', Green 10'	28,067 (3,251 away fans)	J. Moss (West Yorkshire)	11
2 January 2012	25	3.00pm	Hull City	A	1–0	Robinson 46'	20,704 (1,505 away fans)	P. Gibbs (West Midlands)	9
14 January 2012	26	3.00pm	Coventry City	H	1–0	Ball 75'	24,126 (975 away fans)	R. East (Wiltshire)	8
21 January 2012	27	3.00pm	Burnley	A	0–0		14,032 (892 away fans)	L. Probert (Gloucestershire)	11
31 January 2012	28	7.45pm	Barnsley	A	2–3	Ward 69', Carroll 90'	10,149 (1,385 away fans)	A. Woolmer (Northamptonshire)	12
11 February 2012	29	3.00pm	Millwall	A	0–0		10,069 (754 away fans)	O. Langford (West Midlands)	13
14 February 2012	30	7.45pm	Reading	H	0–1		22,567 (521 away fans)	G. Eltringham Sunderland	13
18 February 2012	31	3.00pm	Southampton	A	0–4		24,536 (1,057 away fans)	G. Scott (Oxfordshire)	15
23 February 2012	32	7.45pm	Leicester City	H	0–1		28,205 (1,848 away fans)	S. Hooper (Wiltshire)	15
3 March 2012	33	3.00pm	Birmingham City	A	2–2	S.Davies 61', Robinson 66'	17,996 (1,415 away fans)	P. Tierney (Lancashire)	16
6 March 2012	34	7.45pm	Blackpool	H	2–1	S.Davies 51', 75'	26,320 (750 away fans)	C. Boyeson (East Yorkshire)	14
10 March 2012	35	3.00pm	Watford	H	1–2	S.Davies 31'	23,130 (633 away fans)	S. Mathieson (Cheshire)	15
13 March 2012	36	7.45pm	Nottingham Forest	H	1–0	Buxton 90+4'	33,010 (4,215 away fans)	A. D'Urso (Essex)	13
17 March 2012	37	3.00pm	Doncaster Rovers	A	2–1	Robinson 13', Roberts 55'	9,791 (1,777 away fans)	D. Coote (Nottingham)	11
20 March 2012	38	7.45pm	Brighton & Hove Albion	A	0–2		18,412 (768 away fans)	D. Sheldrake (Surrey)	12
24 March 2012	39	3.00pm	Crystal Palace	H	3–2	S.Davies 6', Hendrick 29', Robinson 49' (pen.)	25,222 (1,528 away fans)	M. Russell (Hertfordshire)	12
31 March 2012	40	3.00pm	Bristol City	A	1–1	Bryson 20'	12,794 (864 away fans)	G. Ward (Surrey)	13
7 April 2012	41	3.00pm	Ipswich Town	H	0–0		24,156 (679 away fans)	M. Haywood (West Yorkshire)	12
9 April 2012	42	3.00pm	Leeds United	A	2–0	Bryson 32', S.Davies 66'	21,363 (1,433 away fans)	O. Langford (West Midlands)	11
14 April 2012	43	3.00pm	Middlesbrough	H	0–1		24,654 (1,314 away fans)	C. Pawson (South Yorkshire)	13
17 April 2012	44	7.45pm	Cardiff City	A	0–2		21,216 (279 away fans)	L. Probert (Gloucestershire)	14
21 April 2012	45	3.00pm	Portsmouth	A	2–1	Buxton 41', S.Davies 78' (pen.)	17,770 (1,228 away fans)	M. Naylor (South Yorkshire)	11
28 April 2012	46	12.30pm	Peterborough United	H	1–1	Robinson 21'	27,354 (1,741 away fans)	R. East (Wiltshire)	12

=== FA Cup ===
Date	Round	K.O.	Opponents	Home/ Away	Result F – A	Derby Scorers	Attendance	Referee
7 January 2012	3rd Round Proper	3:00pm	Crystal Palace	H	1–0	Robinson 9'	10,113 (628 away fans)	D. Drysdale (Lincolnshire)
28 January 2012	4th Round Proper	3.00pm	Stoke City	H	0–2		22,247 (5,569 away fans)	M. Clattenburg (Tyne and Wear)

=== Football League Cup ===
Date	Round	K.O.	Opponents	Home/ Away	Result F – A	Derby Scorers	Attendance	Referee
9 August 2011	1st Round	7.45pm	Shrewsbury Town	H	2–3	Maguire 46', Robinson 78'	7,073 (666 away fans)	D. Drysdale (Lincolnshire)

== Squad statistics ==
=== Appearances, goals and cards ===
No.	Pos.	Name	League		FA Cup		League Cup		Total		Discipline	
No.	Pos.	Name	Apps	Goals	Apps	Goals	Apps	Goals	Apps	Goals	Yellow card	Red card
1	GK	(England) Frank Fielding	44	0	2	0	1	0	47	0	1	1
2	DF	(England) John Brayford	22/1	0	2	0	1	0	25/1	0	1	0
3	DF	(Wales) Gareth Roberts	39/2	1	2	0	0/1	0	41/3	1	6	0
4	MF	(Scotland) Craig Bryson	44	6	2	0	0	0	46	6	5	0
5	DF	(England) Shaun Barker	19/1	0	2	0	0	0	21/1	0	4	0
6	DF	(England) Jason Shackell	46	1	2	0	1	0	49	1	9	0
7	FW	(England) Steve Davies	20/6	12	0	0	1	0	21/6	12	4	0
9	FW	(England) Nathan Tyson	13/10	0	0/1	0	0	0	13/11	0	2	0
10	FW	(Northern Ireland) Jamie Ward	35/2	4	2	0	0	0	37/2	4	4	0
11	FW	(Scotland) Chris Maguire	2/5	1	0	0	1	1	3/5	2	0	0
12	DF	(Scotland) Russell Anderson	5/3	0	0	0	0	0	5/3	0	2	0
12	FW	(England) Ryan Noble	1/1	0	0	0	0	0	1/1	0	0	0
13	GK	(England) Adam Legzdins	2/2	0	0	0	0	0	2/2	0	0	0
14	FW	(United States) Conor Doyle	1/5	0	0	0	0	0	1/5	0	0	0
15	MF	(Scotland) Stephen Pearson	0	0	0	0	1	0	1	0	0	0
16	MF	(England) James Bailey	17/5	0	2	0	0	0	19/5	0	4	0
17	DF	(England) Jake Buxton	11/9	2	0/2	0	0	0	11/11	2	0	0
18	MF	(England) Ben Davies	30/5	1	0	0	1	0	31/5	1	4	0
19	FW	(Poland) Tomasz Cywka	3/5	1	0	0	0/1	0	3/6	1	0	0
19	MF	(England) Tom Carroll	8/4	1	0	0	0	0	8/4	1	0	0
20	DF	(England) Chris Riggott	0	0	0	0	0	0	0	0	0	0
21	FW	(England) Theo Robinson	27/12	10	1	1	1	1	29/12	12	4	0
22	MF	(England) Lee Croft	4/4	0	0	0	1	0	5/4	0	1	0
23	MF	(Republic of Ireland) Jeff Hendrick	38/4	3	1	0	0	0	39/4	3	1	0
24	DF	(Republic of Ireland) Mark O'Brien	15/5	0	0	0	1	0	16/5	0	1	0
25	FW	(England) Callum Ball	11/12	3	2	0	0	0	13/12	3	1	0
26	DF	(Republic of Ireland) Kevin Kilbane	7/2	1	0	0	1	0	8/2	1	0	0
27	DF	(England) Chris Jones	0	0	0	0	0	0	0	0	0	0
28	FW	(England) Mason Bennett	2/7	0	0	0	0	0	2/7	0	0	0
29	MF	(England) Will Hughes	1/2	0	0	0	0	0	1/2	0	0	0
30	DF	(England) Josh Lelan	0	0	0	0	0	0	0	0	0	0
31	DF	(England) Tom Naylor	8	0	0/1	0	0	0	0	8/1	0	0
32	MF	(Republic of Ireland) Paul Green	25/1	1	2	0	0	0	27/1	1	1	0
33	FW	(Hungary) Tamás Priskin	4/1	1	0	0	0	0	4/1	1	1	0
33	GK	(England) James Severn	0	0	0	0	0	0	0	0	0	0
34	MF	(Republic of Ireland) Ryan Connolly	0	0	0	0	0	0	0	0	0	0
35	FW	(England) Kwame Thomas	0	0	0	0	0	0	0	0	0	0

== Records ==
=== Club ===
Record	Statistic	Dates(s)
Biggest Win	3–0 v Doncaster Rovers v Millwall	20 August 2011; 24 September 2011
Biggest Defeat	0–4 v Leicester City v Southampton	1 October 2011; 18 February 2012
Consecutive Victories	4	6 August 2011 – 20 August 2011; 26 December 2011 – 14 January 2012
Unbeaten Run	5	26 December 2011 – 21 January 2012
Consecutive Defeats	5	2 November 2011 – 29 November 2011
Winless Run	7	21 January 2012 – 3 March 2012

(The above statistics refer to league matches only)

=== Individuals ===
==== League ====
Most league appearances
Pos	Player	Country	Apps (Subs)
1	Jason Shackell	(England)	46
2	Craig Bryson	(Scotland)	44
=	Frank Fielding	(England)	44
4	Jeff Hendrick	(Republic of Ireland)	38/4
5	Gareth Roberts	(Wales)	39/2

Most league Goals
Pos	Player	Country	Goals
1	Steve Davies	(England)	12
2	Theo Robinson	(England)	10
3	Craig Bryson	(Scotland)	5
4	Jamie Ward	(Northern Ireland)	4
5	Callum Ball	(England)	3

==== All competitions ====
Most appearances
Pos	Player	Country	Apps (Subs)
1	Jason Shackell	(England)	49
2	Frank Fielding	(England)	47
3	Craig Bryson	(Scotland)	46
4	Gareth Roberts	(Wales)	41/3
5	Jeff Hendrick	(Republic of Ireland)	39/4

Most goals
Pos	Player	Country	Goals
1	Steve Davies	(England)	12
=	Theo Robinson	(England)	12
3	Craig Bryson	(Scotland)	5
4	Jamie Ward	(Northern Ireland)	4
5	Callum Ball	(England)	3

== Season Awards ==
Award	Player
Jack Stamps Player of the Year	Craig Bryson
Club Player of the Year	Craig Bryson
Supporter's Club Player of the Year	Craig Bryson
Sammy Crooks Young Player of the Year	Jeff Hendrick
Academy Player of the Year	Mason Bennett
Scholar of the Year	Will Hughes
Goal of the Season	Jamie Ward v Nottingham Forest
Contribution to the Community Award	Mark O'Brien
Brian Clough Award	Heather Gorham

== Reserves ==
=== Results ===
Win Draw Loss Upcoming fixture

==== Pre-season ====
Date	Competition	Opponents	Home/ Away	Result F – A	Derby Scorers	Attendance
23 July 2011	Friendly	Eastwood Town	A	4–0	Robinson 10', 56', Galinski 22', Ball 26'	413
25 July 2011	Friendly	Matlock Town	A	2–3	Cywka 34', Robinson 36'	
26 July 2011	Friendly	Gresley	A	3–2	Bennett 30', Wixted 69', Hughes 77'	219
27 July 2011	Bass Charity Vase	Burton Albion	A	1–2	Witham 57'	1,023
1 August 2011	Friendly	Belper Town	A	4–1	Robinson 7', Ball 45', Wixted 53', Dales 87'	

==== Division One Central ====
Date	Match No.	K.O.	Opponents	Home/ Away	Full Time F – A	Derby Scorers	Att.	Pos
24 August 2011	1	7.00 pm	Port Vale	A	3–1	Robinson 14', Maguire 46', Ball 60'	2	
7 September 2011	2	7.00 pm	Walsall	H	6–1	Anderson 20', Ball 26', Maguire 36', Cwyka 74', 88' (pen.), Witham 81'	1	292
28 September 2011	3	7.00pm	Burton Albion	A	3–2	Saunders (??), Witham 23', Maguire 71'	1	233
12 October 2011	4	7.00pm	Nottingham Forest	H	3–4	Cwyka 38', 40'; Doyle 59'	1	
16 November 2011	5	7.00pm	Sheffield United	A	1–1	Ball 65'	1	
4 January 2012	6	7.00pm	Port Vale	H	3–0	Cwyka 15', 26', Witham 81'	1	
24 January 2012	7	7.00pm	Burton Albion	H	1–4	Maguire 53'	1	
7 March 2012	8	7.00pm	Stoke City	H	0–0		1	163
21 March 2011	9	7:00pm	Nottingham Forest	A	2–1	Ball 6', Nzuzi 30'	1	446
26 March 2011	10	1:00pm	Sheffield United	H	0–1		1	
4 April 2011	11	2.00pm	Walsall	A	1–1	Bennett 47'	2	
2 May 2012	12	1.30pm	Stoke City	A	3–0	Thomas (??), Jones (?)		2

==== Totesport Cup ====
===== Group stage =====
Date	Round	K.O.	Opponents	Home/ Away	Result F – A	Derby Scorers	Pos
30 August 2011	Group 2	2.00pm	Chesterfield	A	3–2	Ball (??), Wixted (??)	1
31 October 2011	Group 2	7.00pm	Port Vale	H	1–0	Ball 29'	1
21 November 2011	Group 2	2.00pm	Rotherham United	A	5–0	Doyle 36', 45', Witham 38', Ball 63', 90'	1
1 February 2012	Group 2	1.00pm	Stoke City	H	1–1	O'Reilly (O.G.) (??)	1

===== Knockout stages =====
Date	Round	K.O.	Opponents	Home/ Away	Result F – A	Derby Scorers
18 April 2012	Semi Final	2.00pm	Sunderland	H	3–2	Thomas 52', Hughes 70', Jones 73'
TBA	Final	TBA	Manchester City	H		

==== Derbyshire Senior Cup ====
Date	Round	K.O.	Opponents	Home/ Away	Result F – A	Derby Scorers
13 December 2011	Rd 3	2.00pm	Belper Town	A	9–3	Cwyka 6', 20', Martin 26', 65', Witham 53', Croft 63', Maguire 70', 83', Wright (O.G.) (??)
18 January 2012	Rd 4	7.00pm	Pinxton	H	4–0	B.Davies 13', Maguire 29', 61', 83'
15 February 2012	Semi Final	7.30pm	New Mills	H	4–1	Naylor 10', Addison 53', 59', 67' (pen.)
25 April 2012	Final	7.30pm	Buxton	N	0–1	

=== Player statistics ===
Pos.	Name	League		Tote Cup		DS Cup		Total	
Pos.	Name	Apps	Goals	Apps	Goals	Apps	Goals	Apps	Goals
DF	(England) Addison	0	0	1	0	1	3	2	3
DF	(Scotland) Anderson	1	1	0	0	0	0	1	1
MF	(England) Bailey	2	0	1	0	1	0	4	0
FW	(England) Ball	8	4	4	5	1	0	13	9
DF	(England) Barker	1	0	1	0	0	0	2	0
FW	(England) Bennett	2/1	1	1	0	1	0	4/1	1
DF	(England) Buxton	6	0	3	0	3	0	12	0
DF	(England) Berry	2	0	1	0	0/2	0	3/2	0
MF	(England) Carroll	1	0	1	0	0	0	2	0
MF	(Republic of Ireland) Connolly	6	0	2	0	2	0	10	0
DF	(England) Cole	2/1	0	2/1	0	0	0	4/2	0
MF	(England) Croft	4	0	1	0	1	1	5	1
FW	(Poland) Cywka	6	6	1	0	1	2	8	8
MF	(England) Dales	1/1	0	0/2	0	1	0	2/3	0
MF	(England) B. Davies	1	0	1	0	2	1	4	1
FW	(England) S. Davies	1	0	1	0	1	0	3	0
MF	(England) Dawkins	1/3	0	1/1	0	2	0	4/4	0
MF	(England) Dobie	1	0	0	0	0	0	1	0
FW	(United States) Doyle	6	2	2	2	3	0	11	4
GK	(England) Etheridge	0	0	1	0	0/1	0	1/1	0
MF	(England) Garnett	1	0	0	0	0	0	1	0
DF	(Poland) Galinski	3/2	0	1/2	0	0/2	0	5/6	0
MF	(Republic of Ireland) Green	1	0	2	0	0	0	3	0
FW	(Netherlands) Gyasi	1	0	0	0	0	0	1	0
MF	(England) Hayes	0	0	0/1	0	0	0	0/1	0

Pos.	Name	League		Tote Cup		DS Cup		Total	
Pos.	Name	Apps	Goals	Apps	Goals	Apps	Goals	Apps	Goals
MF	(Republic of Ireland) Hendrick	0	0	0	0	1	0	1	0
MF	(England) Hughes	2/3	0	3/1	1	0	0	5/4	1
DF	(England) Jones	11	1	2	1	2	0	15	2
DF	(Republic of Ireland) Kilbane	1	0	0	0	0	0	1	0
DF	(England) Leacock	2	0	1/1	0	1	0	4/1	0
MF	(England) Lee	1	0	0	0	0	0	1	0
DF	(England) Lelan	3/4	0	2/1	1	1	0	7/5	0
GK	(England) Legzdins	9	0	4	0	3	0	16	0
FW	(Scotland) Maguire	8	4	1	0	3	5	12	9
MF	(England) Martin	1	0	2	0	0/1	2	3/1	2
DF	(England) Naylor	5	0	2	0	2	1	9	1
DF	(Democratic Republic of the Congo) Nzuzi	2	1	0	0	0	0	2	1
DF	(Republic of Ireland) O'Brien	0	0	0	0	1	0	1	0
MF	(Scotland) Pearson	1	0	0	0	0	0	1	0
FW	(England) Richards	1/5	2	0/2	0	1	0	2/7	2
DF	(England) Riggott	2	0	1	0	1	0	4	0
DF	(Wales) Roberts	1	0	0	0	0	0	1	0
FW	(England) Robinson	2	1	0	0	1	0	3	1
MF	(England) Saunders	1	1	0	0	0	0	1	1
GK	(England) Severn	3	0	0	0	1/1	0	4/1	0
DF	(England) Sharpe	3/2	0	2	0	1	0	6/2	0
FW	(England) Thomas	2/2	0	1/1	1	1	0	3/3	1
MF	(England) Witham	9/2	4	3/1	1	3	1	16/3	6
MF	(England) Wixted	1/1	0	1	1	0/1	0	2/2	1
FW	(Tanzania) Yussuf	1	0	0	0	0	0	1	0
