= Peter Trembling =

English football club owner (born 1962)

- Born: Peter Edward William Trembling; March 1962 (age 63)
- Known for: Former owner of Notts County F.C.

Peter Edward William Trembling (born March 1962) is a former chairman of Notts County football club.

He was introduced to the club as the representative of Munto Finance, and in December 2009 purchased the club from them for a nominal amount. He later sold the club to a consortium of buyers from Lincoln, headed by Ray Trew.

Trembling worked in the credit card industry, and combined this with his leisure interest to become Head of Sport at MBNA. He helped several football clubs launch their own credit cards, and this later led to a move to Everton F.C. as commercial director. He was approached by Nathan Willett of Munto to become Chairman of Notts County and fronted their takeover of the club.
