= Gurpal Virdi =

Gurpal Singh Virdi (born 1958) is a former local councillor for the London Borough of Hounslow between May 2014 and May 2018, previously serving for the Metropolitan Police from 1982 as the first officer from Asian descent from Hounslow to join the police force. Virdi retired from the Metropolitan Police in 2012 following what he described as institutional racism and discrimination within the Police Force.

== Early life ==
Virdi grew up in Southall, London. His education started with the bussing out programme during which immigrant ethnic minority children were dispersed across schools in the hope that it would help them integrate. After completing full-time education, Virdi worked at Beecham Products (GlaxoSmithKline), based in Hounslow.

== Metropolitan Police ==
In 1982, Gurpal Virdi joined the Metropolitan Police as the first officer of Asian descent from Hounslow to join the police force. Virdi worked both in active uniform service and within the Criminal Investigation Department (plainclothes detectives). During his thirty years’ service, he was very vocal in challenging the mistreatment of ethnic minority communities.

By his retirement in 2012, Virdi was recognised for 30 years of exemplary performance within the Metropolitan Police.

=== Dismissal and acquittal ===
In 1998, whilst serving on neighbouring Ealing Division he was arrested and accused of sending race hate mail to his colleagues. Virdi was one of 13 black and Asian officers who received a printed image of a black man accompanied by the message: “Not wanted. Keep the police force white, so leave now or else”. Scotland Yard claimed that Mr Virdi himself had sent the mail, sparked by anger at being turned down for promotion. He was dismissed from the police in 2000. The subsequent employment tribunal case exonerated Virdi and led to the Metropolitan Police Authority Virdi Inquiry report, published in 2002. Virdi was issued with a full written apology by the Commissioner, Sir John Stevens, before returning to work in 2002

An investigation by Peter Marshall into Virdi's wrongful dismissal was awarded the RIMA (Race In The Media Award).

Virdi retired from the Metropolitan Police in 2012, following what he described as institutional racism and discrimination within the Police Force.

== Later life ==
In 2012, Virdi carried the Olympic Torch from Richmond to Hounslow on Kew Bridge as part of the 2012 Summer Olympics torch relay.

Virdi was elected as a local councillor for the London Borough of Hounslow between May 2014 and May 2018, representing Labour for the majority of his time.

He trained to become a tutor for Adult Education and worked with vulnerable people. He also worked as a Youth Justice Panel member.

=== Accusation of indecent assault ===
In 2014, Virdi was accused of indecent assault on 7 November 1986. The accuser told police that Mr Virdi had attacked him and shoved a retractable police baton up his backside in the back of a prison van, though such batons were not in use in Britain at the time of the alleged attack. In July 2015, Gurpal was acquitted at Southwark Crown Court of any wrongdoing. During the trial, Mr Virdi accused the Met of bringing the criminal case against him as part of a 17-year campaign to "hound" him out of the force.

The case of Gurpal Virdi was subsequently picked up by Sir Peter Bottomley in 1998, notable as previously Member of Parliament and advocate at the time of the murder of Stephen Lawrence. Bottomley requested that the Home Secretary, at that point Theresa May, review the case. In March 2018 Bottomley submitted an Early Day Motion, calling for a parliamentary debate on the matter. On 28 March Sir Peter successfully requested to meet with the Prime Minister Theresa May to discuss the matter and how to eradicate institutionalised racism from such important establishments as the Metropolitan Police.

Virdi authored the book Behind the Blue Line published in 2018 by Biteback, detailing Virdi's fight against racism and discrimination in the Metropolitan Police.
