= Ben Davies (footballer, born 1981) =

English footballer

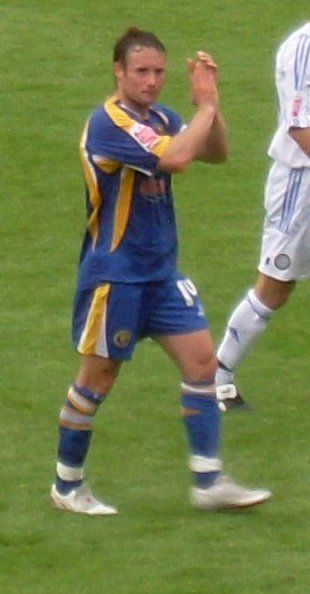
- Davies playing for Shrewsbury Town in 2008

Personal information
- Full name: Benjamin James Davies
- Date of birth: 27 May 1981 (age 45)
- Place of birth: Birmingham, England
- Positions: Midfielder; right-back

Team information
- Current team: Grimsby Town (First team coach)

Youth career
- 1995–1999: Stoke City
- 1999–2000: Walsall

Senior career*
Years	Team	Apps	(Gls)
2000–2002	Kidderminster Harriers	13	(0)
2002–2006	Chester City	155	(16)
2006–2009	Shrewsbury Town	115	(30)
2009–2011	Notts County	67	(20)
2011–2014	Derby County	75	(6)
2014	→ Sheffield United (loan)	18	(3)
2014–2015	Sheffield United	14	(4)
2015–2016	Portsmouth	43	(1)
2016–2018	Grimsby Town	59	(3)
2018–2019	Boston United	36	(8)
2019–2020	Cleethorpes Town	22	(0)
2020–2021	Grimsby Town	0	(0)
Total		617	(91)

Managerial career
- 2020: Grimsby Town (caretaker)
- 2023: Grimsby Town (joint-caretaker)
- * Club domestic league appearances and goals

Benjamin James Davies (born 27 May 1981) is an English football coach and former professional player who is a first team coach at EFL League Two club Grimsby Town.

As a player he was as a right back and midfielder playing between 2000 and 2021. Born in Birmingham, he began his career with Walsall before dropping into the Football Conference, playing for Kidderminster Harriers and Chester City. Moving back to the Football League he had spells with Shrewsbury Town, Notts County and Derby County before signing for Sheffield United, Portsmouth and Grimsby Town His career continued in non-league with a spells at Boston United and Cleethorpes Town. In 2019 he returned to Grimsby as a coach and briefly registered as a player again during 2020–21 season.

== Career ==
=== Early career ===
Davies began his career with the youth system at Stoke City aged fifteen. He then joined Walsall in 1999 as part of their youth team. He had spells with Kidderminster Harriers and Chester City, where he won a Football Conference championship medal in 2004. During his time at the Deva, he was made club captain.

=== Shrewsbury Town ===
Davies joined Shrewsbury Town two days before turning 25, making his club debut in the 2006–07 opener against Mansfield Town, which finished 2–2. He scored in Shrewsbury's next three matches, going on to net a total of 12 times over the course of the season.

After Davies helped Shrewsbury to seventh position in the league, he suffered an injury in the play-off semi-final against MK Dons, which meant that he missed the 2007 Football League Two play-off final, and was expected miss to the first half of the 2007–08 season. Davies recovered faster than expected from his Achilles tendon injury, returning for the first team in late November. He played an instrumental role in Shrewsbury's return to winning ways, scoring a stunning free kick and an excellent driven goal in a 4–0 win against Dagenham and Redbridge and also scoring away against Accrington Stanley. Following Stewart Drummond's departure in the January 2008 transfer window, Davies was installed as Shrewsbury's club captain.

He underwent a double hernia operation in November 2008, which kept him out for a month. Having missed the 2007 final, Davies played the 2009 League Two play-off final, which Shrewsbury lost. One of several key players out of contract at the end of the season, Shrewsbury did offer Davies a contract extension, however, Notts County offered him a deal which he felt gave him a greater chance at achieving his ambition to play at a higher level. As a result, Davies left Shrewsbury to join County.

=== Notts County ===
Davies had a successful first season at League Two club Notts County during their 2009–10 campaign, playing an integral part in them winning the league. He became the highest scoring midfielder in a single season in County's history as he scored 16 goals, alongside 20 assists, and won several awards, including Supporters player of the year, club player of the year and goal of the season, as well as being named in the PFA Team of the year.

His form was such that in August 2010 he was subject to overtures from Championship club Derby County, with Derby boss Nigel Clough leaving a 2–1 defeat at Coventry City 5 minutes early left to watch the player. Davies remained at County however, and in his first season at League One level hit 5 goals in 22 games, including two strikes in a 3–2 victory at Peterborough United, as well as numerous assist. The form saw Derby retain their interest into the January 2011 transfer window, lodging several bids which were rejected, Davies desire to play Championship football saw him hand in a transfer request, despite proclaiming "I absolutely love it here, I'm the happiest I have ever been in my career." Finally, a bid from Derby in the region of £350k was accepted by County and the player completed a move on 20 January 2011, signing a 2 1/2-year deal to run until July 2013.

=== Derby County ===
Davies made his full Derby County debut on 22 January 2011 in a 1–0 home defeat to fierce rivals Nottingham Forest. Joining the club in a run of form which had seen just one win from their previous nine fixtures, Davies had to wait until his seventh appearance before tasting a victory at his new club; a 1–0 victory at relegation rivals Sheffield United. As the club itself struggled, so did Davies with the step up and, after starting in a 3–1 home defeat to Doncaster Rovers, Davies was dropped to the bench. Davies later admitted that he deserved to be dropped; "I'm not one to hide and my performances weren't good enough – I know that. I hold my hands up. I couldn't go knocking the manager's door down saying I deserved to be in the team because, based on my performances, I didn't." Davies was eventually recalled to the starting line-up in April 2011, hitting the winner in a 2–1 victory over Leeds United, with an "unstoppable" 20-yard volley. Despite this, Davies was unable to hold down a regular place for the remainder of the season.

After playing an active role in Derby's pre-season fixtures, Davies found himself in the first team for the start of the 2011–12 season, playing every minute as Derby won their opening four fixtures for the first time in 106-years to find themselves in 2nd place in the early season table. The fourth victory, 3–0 over Doncaster Rovers, saw Davies open his account for the season as well as provide assists for the other two goals. Davies was rewarded with a place in the Championship Team of the Week, something he repeated following his performance in a 3–0 win over Millwall, a game in which he created two of Derby's three goals. The form of Davies dropped during November he was dropped from the starting 11 at the start of December, making only three substitute appearances until the start of March 2012, making an immediate impact as he set up a headed goal for Steve Davies within 2 minutes of coming on. With Davies restored to the starting eleven, Derby manager Nigel Clough urged Davies take advantage of the injury of Jamie Ward, stating the quality Davies can offer from set pieces and crosses. Davies was eventually credited with 11 assists during the 2011–12 season, 10 in the league and 1 in the League Cup.

In 2012–13, Davies lost his place as a regular member of the matchday squad and was restricted to limited substitute appearances and games as an overage player in Derby's under-21 team. Despite this Davies scored his first goal in 15 months in a 3–1 win against Leeds United Davies scoring in the stoppage time after being introduced in the 82nd minute of the game. Davies hoped this goal help regain his place in starting line up at Derby after he turned down several loan moves due to personal issues after his ten-month-old son Evan had health issues and had an eye operation. Davies began to feature more regularly for County after the turn of the year, and after impressing manager Nigel Clough with his performances in March and April, Davies was offered a new one-year contract at the end of April.

2013–14 saw Davies restricted to the League Cup and two substitute appearances in the opening stages of the season. After the sacking of Nigel Clough at the end of September, Davies appeared just twice more as a substitute and following an 89th-minute substitute in a 3–0 win over Sheffield Wednesday on 9 November 2013 he disappeared from the first team picture completely.

=== Sheffield United ===
Davies eventually linked up with former manager Clough in February 2014 when he signed for Sheffield United on loan until the end of the season. With United struggling with injuries, Davies was initially employed as a left-back and scored his first goal for the club from a free kick in a 2–0 home victory over Peterborough United at the start of March. Davies played regularly for United for the remainder of the season, appearing in a number of positions, and finished the campaign having made 20 appearances for the Blades and scored three goals. With his deal at Derby due to expire, United offered Davies a permanent contract in the summer of 2014, a deal which he duly signed the following month.

Davies was released when his contract expired at the end of the 2014–15 season.

=== Portsmouth ===
Following a pre-season trial Davies signed a one-year deal with Portsmouth on 6 August 2015. He scored his first goal for Portsmouth in a 6–0 win over York City on 24 November 2015. His consistent performances led to Davies being awarded six different player-of-the-season trophies from supporter groups, the biggest haul of any player and finished runner-up to Michael Doyle who won The News/Sports Mail Player of the Season award.

Davies left Portsmouth come the end of the 2015–16 season, this was due to both parties failing to agree terms, However he was keen for a two-year contract and an increase in salary.

=== Grimsby Town ===
On 29 June 2016, Davies signed a one-year contract with newly promoted League Two club Grimsby Town on a free transfer. He scored on his debut against Morecambe F.C. on Saturday 6 August 2016 with a free-kick to seal Grimsby's 2–0 win. Davies picked up a calf injury on 8 October in a 0–0 draw at Exeter City, this led to a two-month spell on the sidelines.

Following the end of 2016–17, during which he made 25 league appearances and scored one goal, Davies agreed a new one-year contract. Davies turned down offers from other clubs down south to stay at Grimsby. He was released by Grimsby at the end of the 2017–18 season.

=== Boston United ===
On 24 August 2018, Davies joined National League North club Boston United.

=== Cleethorpes Town ===
On 20 July 2019 it was confirmed that Davies had joined Cleethorpes Town.

== Coaching career ==
On 18 November 2019, Grimsby Town announced that Davies would be assisting interim manager, Anthony Limbrick and Dave Moore on a temporary basis. Davies already worked for the club as an academy coach alongside his playing career at Cleethorpes Town. Davies eventually returned to Grimsby permanently and became First Team coach and U23 Manager under new manager Ian Holloway. In January 2020, Holloway hinted that Davies would be offered a playing contract as well, although this wasn't made official until he was handed a squad number for the start of the 2020–21 season.

Davies was placed in temporary charge of the Mariners when Ian Holloway resigned his position on 23 December 2020. In his managerial debut, Grimsby were beaten 3–1 at Morecambe. In his second and final game as caretaker manager on 29 December 2020, The Mariners drew 0–0 with Oldham Athletic. Davies reverted to his previous coaching role the following day as Grimsby appointed Paul Hurst as the new first team manager.

On 29 October 2023, Davies and Shaun Pearson were appointed joint-caretaker managers following the dismissal of Paul Hurst and assistant manager Chris Doig.

On 27 November 2023, it was announced that David Artell was to take over as the next permanent Grimsby manager and it was also announced that Davies would remain at the club as First Team Coach.

On 4 July 2025, Davies changed roles from First Team Coach to Lead Youth Development Phase Coach.

== Personal life ==
Born in Birmingham, Davies supported Aston Villa as a child.

== Career statistics ==
As of match played 22 April 2019

Appearances and goals by club, season and competition
Club	Season	League			FA Cup		League Cup		Other		Total	
Club	Season	Division	Apps	Goals	Apps	Goals	Apps	Goals	Apps	Goals	Apps	Goals
Kidderminster Harriers	2000–01	Third Division	3	0	0	0	1	0	0	0	14	0
Kidderminster Harriers	2001–02	Third Division	9	0	0	0	1	0	0	0	10	0
Kidderminster Harriers	Total		12	0	0	0	2	0	0	0	14	0
Chester City	2002–03	Football Conference	31	2	2	0	1	0	0	0	34	2
Chester City	2003–04	Football Conference	35	5	1	0	0	0	0	0	36	5
Chester City	2004–05	League Two	44	2	2	0	1	0	2 (Note: Appearance(s) in Football League Trophy)	0	49	2
Chester City	2005–06	League Two	45	7	4	0	1	1	1	0	51	8
Chester City	Total		155	16	9	0	3	1	3	0	170	17
Shrewsbury Town	2006–07	League Two	43	12	2	0	1	0	5 (Note: Three appearances in Football League Trophy, two appearances in League Two play-offs)	0	51	12
Shrewsbury Town	2007–08	League Two	27	6	0	0	0	0	0	0	27	6
Shrewsbury Town	2008–09	League Two	45	12	0	0	1	0	3	1	49	13
Shrewsbury Town	Total		115	30	2	0	2	0	8	1	127	31
Notts County	2009–10	League Two	45	15	6	1	0	0	0	0	51	16
Notts County	2010–11	League One	22	5	3	1	3	1	1	1	29	8
Notts County	Total		67	20	9	2	3	1	1	1	80	24
Derby County	2010–11	Championship	13	1	—		—		—		13	1
Derby County	2011–12	Championship	35	1	0	0	1	0	0	0	36	1
Derby County	2012–13	Championship	23	4	2	1	1	0	0	0	26	5
Derby County	2013–14	Championship	4	0	—		3	0	0	0	7	0
Derby County	Total		75	6	2	1	5	0	0	0	82	7
Sheffield United (loan)	2013–14	League One	18	3	2	0	0	0	0	0	20	3
Sheffield United	2014–15	League One	14	4	1	0	3	0	1	0	19	4
Sheffield United	Total		32	7	3	0	3	0	1	0	39	7
Portsmouth	2015–16	League Two	43	1	5	0	1	0	2 (Note: Appearances in League Two play-offs)	0	51	1
Portsmouth	Total		43	1	5	0	1	0	2	0	51	1
Grimsby Town	2016–17	League Two	25	1	0	0	1	0	0	0	26	1
Grimsby Town	2017–18	League Two	34	2	1	0	1	0	1 (Note: Appearance in EFL Trophy)	0	37	2
Grimsby Town	Total		59	3	1	0	2	0	1	0	63	3
Boston United	2018–19	National League North	36	8	0	0	—		1 (Note: Appearance in FA Trophy)	0	37	8
Career total			565	91	31	3	21	2	17	2	663	98

== Honours ==
Chester City

- Football Conference: 2003–04

Notts County

- Football League Two: 2009–10

Individual

- PFA Team of the Year: 2008–09 League Two, 2009–10 League Two
- Notts County Goal of the Year: 2009–10 against Bury (3 April 2010)
- Notts County Player of the Year: 2009–10
- Notts County Supporters' Player of the Year: 2009–10
- Notts County Player of the Month: 2009–10
