= Qadbak Investments =

British Virgin Islander investment vehicle company

Qadbak Investments Ltd was a British Virgin Islands registered company which served as the vehicle for the short-lived purchase of English football club Notts County for £1, and for a failed attempt to purchase Formula One team BMW Sauber.

The company first came to public prominence in July 2009 upon their purchase of Notts County via its subsidiary Munto Finance. They were advised in the deal by con-man Russell King. In September 2009, it was announced that they had agreed to purchase the BMW Sauber Formula One team, hastening its return to the F1 fold, however this agreement was never concluded.

Qadbak Investments was purported by numerous sources, including official statements from both Notts County and BMW, to represent the collective interests of "certain Middle Eastern and European-based families". In November 2009, it was discovered that Qadbak Investments had no such investors.

== Ownership structure ==
Details concerning the source of the company's finances were kept confidential, with both initial and later reports and official press releases stating that it was "Swiss-based". Later reports stated that the company, as well as its subsidiary Munto Finance, were registered in the British Virgin Islands, what has been confirmed by British Virgin Islands Financial Services Commission on 24 September 2009 after a request made by Swiss newspaper SonntagsZeitung.

== History ==
The company had been represented during the BMW Sauber negotiations by Lionel Fischer, a Swiss national, and two of its representative directors on the Notts County board, Peter and Nathan Willett, who appointed Sven-Goran Eriksson as director of football. German automotive conglomerate BMW were advised during the planning phases of Qadbak's takeover by leading British investment bank Rothschild, whose managing director Meyrick Cox had stated that Qadbak was "a wholly reputable organisation".

Contrary to reports by the British media, the source of Qadbak's finances was partially known to the Notts County Supporters' Trust, who were bound to a confidentiality agreement due to the takeover. On 27 September 2009, Notts County released a statement in which it revealed two families who were purportedly involved in the trust which owns the club, the Shafi and Hyat families, both "noted business families" with "numerous investments" in the Middle East, Japan, Kazakhstan, Europe and North America, with the club having "respected the families' privacy" beforehand. In a response to the press release, Anwar Shafi, a member of the Shafi family, denied that he had a connection with the club or an investment in Qadbak. The club subsequently released a further statement, purporting to be from the Hyat/Shafi Family Trust and its head, Sardar Hyat, confirming its involvement with Qadbak and Notts County.

On 20 October 2009, the Football League announced that Notts County's owners had met its "fit and proper persons" regulations, and that while their structure was "complicated" and featured "both offshore entities and discretionary trusts", it had provided "extensive disclosure" to the League on their ownership structure. The League also stated that public disclosure of their ownership structure was a "matter for the club".

By November 2009, it was becoming clear that Qadbak and its subsidiaries did not have funds to invest. Rothschild denied being involved in any financial transaction between Qadbak and BMW; they merely acted as BMW's adviser. On 27 November 2009 The Guardian revealed that Eriksson had demanded immediate payment of the multimillion-pound sum under the terms of his recruitment by Notts County. A few weeks later Notts County was in fact £7 million in debt and it was resold in December to a new owner.

=== Failure of Sauber acquisition ===
As of 18 November 2009, German automobile manufacturer BMW was still the official owner of BMW Sauber Formula One team and continued to pay the salaries of their approximately 400 employees. On 27 November, BMW announced that it was to sell the team to Peter Sauber instead of Qadbak. A spokesman for BMW was reported in the Guardian newspaper as saying that the combination of no legally effective contract and no starting place on the grid caused the deal with Qadbak to be cancelled. If the Qadbak deal had been put in place, former Sauber drivers Giancarlo Fisichella and Nick Heidfeld would have driven for them.

=== Sale of Notts County ===
On 10 December 2009, BBC Nottingham reported that Munto Finance had put Notts County up for sale. On 12 December 2009, it was announced that Notts County chairman, Peter Trembling purchased the club for a nominal fee from Munto Finance. In February 2010, Trembling sold it on for £1 to Ray Trew, and was threatening to sue Munto.

Further details only came out a year later, through the BBC Panorama report entitled The Trillion Dollar Con Man.
