= Russell King (fraudster) =

British fraudster

- Born: April 11, 1959 (age 67)
- Criminal charges: 25 counts of fraud and larceny
- Capture status: Released from custody
- Wanted since: 2008
- Time at large: Ten years

Details
- Imprisoned at: Jersey

Russell Stephen King (born 11 April 1959) is a convicted fraudster. He is best known for his part in the doomed purchase of Notts County Football Club by Munto Finance, a subsidiary of Qadbak Investments, which was the subject of a BBC One Panorama programme. In July 2018, after several years living in Bahrain, he was extradited to Jersey, where he was charged in the Jersey Royal Court with 25 counts of fraud and larceny. In 2019, he was sentenced to six years imprisonment. He was released in 2021.

== Background ==
King first surfaced in the 1980s as chairman of Celebrity Group Holdings, a publishing company based in Kingston upon Thames, which owned titles such as Basketball Monthly and which was interested in taking over Eddy Shah's newspaper The Post and Hamley's toy shop. It also owned Zodiac Toys, which became insolvent in 1990. Along with his business partner Alan Kingston, King was also a director of Kingston Basketball Club. However, in 1991 King was sentenced to two years in prison for insurance fraud after trying to claim £600,000 for his Aston Martin Zagato after claiming it had been stolen. It was discovered hidden in a garage. Whilst he was in prison, Celebrity Group went into liquidation and was sued for £684,000 by Creditcorp, which alleged fraudulent behaviour by Celebrity Group's directors.

In the 1990s, King was associated with the publicist Max Clifford, and appeared in a controversial episode of Kilroy where Clifford had a fracas with the member of parliament Roger Gale. In 2004, he was involved with a sports agency called Essentially Sport, which represented Jenson Button.

== Belgravia Financial Services Group ==
In the mid 2000s, King was involved with a Jersey-based company called Belgravia Financial Services Group. After the death of a business partner in 2008, King manipulated an employee of the business into transferring £671,000 from the business into his own personal account. He also sold the late partner's collection of cherished number plates and kept the proceeds. When Jersey-based company Close Finance sought repayment of £2m it had loaned to Belgravia, King fled to Bahrain.

== Swiss Commodity Holding, First London Bank, and Qadbak Investments ==
In 2009, King pursued a series of new financial cons, building on founded a company called Swiss Commodity Holding (SCH), which claimed assets of $2 trillion besides the rights to all the gold, iron ore and coal in North Korea. He then approached British investment bank First London plc, and by falsely claiming he was managing billions of dollars for the Bahraini royal family, he got the bank to turn over 49 per cent of its shares to him. The following year, First London went into administration with debts of £8.7m.

=== Notts County F.C. acquisition and resale ===
In July 2009, King acted as head negotiator and consultant for the purchase of Notts County Football Club by Munto Finance, a subsidiary of Qadbak Investments, another company trading on nonexistent connections with wealthy Bahraini families.

King negotiated the sale of the football club to Munto for £1. He personally recruited former England football manager Sven-Göran Eriksson as director of football at Notts County, promising him a large sum if he also worked for SCH. While these negotiations were underway, King, representing SCH, visited North Korean Chairman Kim Yong-nam of the Supreme People's Assembly in Pyongyang. Eriksson and Peter Willett joined King on the trip. The purpose of the visit was nominally to persuade the government to hand over gold mining rights in exchange for billions of US dollars allegedly from Bahraini investors.

King used the pseudonym "L. Voldemort", after the Harry Potter character Lord Voldemort, and later claimed that he could not have been involved because the name Russell King did not appear in any documents. Notts County did not receive the promised funds and was unable to pay its bills. It was resold for a small sum that December five months after the purchase, with debts of £7 million.

=== BMW Sauber attempted acquisition ===
In September 2009, Formula One team BMW Sauber, seeking new investment, announced it was considering a sale to Qadbak Investments. The deal collapsed in November after it was revealed that King was behind the company, and the team was sold back to Sauber instead.

== Bahraini magazines ==
From around 2013, King operated the Middle East edition of a magazine called Food and Travel using different aliases and claiming false statistics on the publication's circulation numbers. He also launched a magazine called FT Business Arabia, falsely claiming it to be the Middle East version of the Financial Times in order to obtain millions of dollars in advertising revenue. He also benefited from barter deals with top hospitality groups and luxury retail brands in the UAE.

== 2018 fraud and larceny charges ==
In 2018, King was extradited from Bahrain to Jersey, and on 27 July 2018, King was charged in the Jersey Royal Court with 25 counts of fraud and larceny that occurred while he was living in Jersey in 2008. These include allegedly selling the Belgravia Financial Services Group in a fraudulent manner, as well as falsification of accounts. Crown Advocate Matthew Jowitt stated "It is alleged the misappropriation is something in the order of £16 million." On 7 August 2018, it was reported that due to the complexity of the case and the speed at which events had happened, the bailiff, Sir William Bailhache, adjourned the case for three weeks, at which point pleas would be entered. In April 2019, King was sentenced to six years' imprisonment for stealing £670,000 from the Belgravia Group in 2008, and in August 2019 he was told to pay back £320,000 or face additional time in jail. He was released in 2021.

== See also ==
- Flavio Briatore, Italian businessman convicted of fraud; involved in Formula 1 and football
- List of notable fraudsters
