= Peter Marshall (journalist) =

British journalist (born 1952)

Peter Marshall (born 1952) is a British journalist and broadcaster who has worked across national and international media since 1978, primarily for the BBC.

== Education ==
He was educated at Rhyl Grammar School, De La Salle College, Jersey, and the pioneering Communication Studies course at Birmingham Polytechnic.

== Career ==
After reporting for the Birkenhead News and Radio City in Liverpool, he joined BBC Radio 4 in 1978.

He joined BBC TV's Newsnight in 1987, specialising in investigative reporting from the UK and around the world, with particular focus on the US He covered Ronald Reagan's 1980 election for BBC Radio 4's The World at One and reported on America at key points throughout the George H. Bush, George W. Bush and the Bill Clinton administrations. He also covered the election and first term of the Obama presidency.

A Liverpool F.C. fan, Marshall was in attendance at the FA Cup semi-final between Liverpool and Nottingham Forest on the day of the Hillsborough disaster, and ended the day reporting on the tragedy for the BBC Ten O'Clock News.

He has made numerous long-form documentaries, including Digging the Dirt on the 2000 US election campaign, The Trillion Dollar Conman on football and international fraud, Cops On Drugs, To Catch A Cop, Tragedy at Smolensk, The King Of Corruption and Hillsborough: How They Buried The Truth

He now works as a freelance for broadcast and print, presenting investigative documentaries on BBC Radio 4, for BBC TV, and ITV.

== Awards ==
- Peter's Hillsborough: How They Buried The Truth won the Bulldog Award for investigative journalism
- His investigation into the wrongful dismissal of Metropolitan Police Sergeant Gurpal Singh Virdi won the Commission for Racial Equality's Race in the Media Award (RIMA).
