= Ray Trew =

English businessman

- Born: Ray Trew; England
- Occupation: Businessman
- Known for: Owner of Contracting Solutions Group

Raymond Arthur Trew (born December 1954) is a businessman and former football club chairman from Lincolnshire. He is a former board member of Lincoln City F.C., Notts County F.C., and Notts County Ladies F.C.

Trew achieved his wealth through recruitment, having founded Contracting Solutions Group in 1995. The company posted a £3.7m profit in 2009. Trew also maintains numerous other private companies, though in 2019 his application for a gangmaster's license was turned down on the grounds that his previous business conduct was not 'fit and proper'.

== Lincoln City ==
On 5 August 2003, Trew became an associate director at Lincoln City becoming a full director at the end of the month. In August 2005 he was appointed chairman of football with Steff Wright succeeding Rob Bradley as chairman of the board. He departed in January 2006 after a boardroom dispute which saw manager Keith Alexander placed on gardening leave, then re-instated. In April three of Trew's companies then terminated their sponsorship deals with the club.

A subsequent bid to buy the club and provide substantial investment was blocked by the Lincoln City board, with chairman Steff Wright publicly questioning Trew's motives.

== Lincoln Ladies ==
In 2006 Trew joined the committee of Lincoln City Ladies. In addition to an £8,000-per-season sponsorship through his SportsTV company, Trew provided additional backing of up to £10,000 to aid the club's promotion bid. In 2008 the club changed its name to OOH Lincoln Ladies, due to a sponsorship deal with Trew's Out Of Home marketing company.

Trew also backed the club's successful FA WSL application, but in 2014 Trew controversially moved the club to Nottingham and rebranded it Notts County Ladies.

== Notts County ==
Trew purchased Notts County for £1 in February 2010 following the departure of Qadbak Investments. He inherited liabilities of £7m from the former owners. On 25 February 2016, Trew stepped down as chairman of Notts County and announced that the club was for sale, but on 10 September 2016, Trew announced he had reinstated himself as chairman of Notts County. On 12 January 2017, Trew sold the club to local businessman Alan Hardy, but one of Trew's companies named Pinnacle Advantage was owed a substantial sum of money by the club. This threatened to force the club into liquidation until an agreement was reached in May 2017.

== Nottingham Rugby Club ==
In July 2010 Trew took control of Nottingham Rugby Club, via Meadow Lane plc. On 28 September 2011 Trew relinquished his interest in Nottingham Rugby Club.
