= Nathan Fox (footballer) =

English footballer

Personal information
- Full name: Nathan James Fox
- Date of birth: 14 November 1992 (age 33)
- Place of birth: Leicester, England
- Height: 5 ft 10 in (1.78 m)
- Position: Defender

Youth career
- –2009: Notts County

Senior career*
Years	Team	Apps	(Gls)
2009–2011	Notts County	1	(0)
2012–2013	Corby Town	8	(0)
2012–2013	→ Kettering Town (loan)	26	(0)
2013	→ Kettering Town (loan)	7	(1)
2013	→ Rugby Town (loan)	21	(0)
2014	Rugby Town	4	(2)
2014–2015	Stamford	55	(2)
2015	Slough Town	3	(0)
2015	Mickleover Sports		
2015–2016	Rushall Olympic		
2016	Rugby Town	5	(0)
2016	Coalville Town	5	(0)
2016–2017	Sutton Coldfield Town		
2017–2018	Redditch United		
2018–2019	Hednesford Town		
2019–2020	King's Lynn Town	28	(0)
2020–2021	Alfreton Town	14	(0)
2021–2022	Buxton	41	(0)
2022–2023	Peterborough Sports		
2023–2024	AFC Telford United		
2024–2026	Spalding United		
- * Club domestic league appearances and goals as of 21:54, 12 May 2022 (UTC)

Nathan James Fox (born 14 November 1992) is an English footballer who plays as a defender.

== Playing career ==
=== Notts County ===
Born in Leicester, Leicestershire, Fox signed a scholarship contract with Notts County on 13 May 2009, along with 14 other players. He made his Football League debut on 1 December for Notts County in the 4–0 home win over Darlington, replacing Matt Ritchie in the 86th minute as a substitute. He left the club at the end of the 2010–11 season. Fox played 90 minutes for a Derby County XI in a pre-season friendly against Burton Albion in July 2011.

=== Corby Town ===
Fox joined Conference North side Corby Town in July 2012.

=== King's Lynn Town ===
On 1 June 2019, Nathan was confirmed as signing for National League North side King's Lynn Town, along with Sam Kelly and Sonny Carey.

Fox played an integral part in helping secure 'The Linnets' The National League North title. He is perhaps known on Norfolk for his energetic runs and fantastic delivery into the danger area. Fox Contributed with 12 assists that season from left back.

=== Alfreton Town FC ===
After winning the Conference North title with Kings Lynn Town FC, Fox was reported to be signing for Kettering Town but opted for Alfreton Town FC.

=== Buxton ===
When football returned for the 2021–22 season following the suspension from COVID-19, Fox dropped down a division to sign for Northern Premier League Premier Division side Buxton. The club were crowned champions and reached the FA Cup second-round in his first season with the side.

=== Peterborough Sports ===
Despite promotion, Fox moved to fellow promoted National League North side Peterborough Sports in June 2022.

== Style of play ==
Hans Backe described Fox saying; "He's typical left back, he's a quick and strong boy with a great left foot, whilst having the athletic attributes he can play and his ball retention is excellent."

Fox has matured as a full back.
